= Cuban National Series Rookie of the Year Award =

The Cuban National Series Rookie of the Year Award goes to the top newcomer in the Cuban National Series.

== List ==
Cuban National Series Rookies of the Year
Season	Winner	Team
1966–67	Arturo Linares	Occidentales
1967–68	Rodolfo Puente	Habana
1968–69	Armando Sánchez	Henequeneros
1969–70	None	—
1970–71	Heriberto Arbolaez	Las Villas
1971–72	Pedro Jova	Azucareros
1972–73	Roberto Ramos	Azucareros
1973–74	Pedro José Rodríguez, Sr.	Azucareros
1974–75	Eduardo Terry	Citricultores
1975–76	Eladio Iglesias	Metropolitanos
1976–77	Lourdes Gourriel	Azucareros
1977–78	José Riveira	Villa Clara
1978–79	Alejo O'Reilly	Villa Clara
1979–80	Reinaldo López	Industriales
1980–81	Rolando Verde	Industriales
1981–82	Jorge Milián	Metropolitanos
1982–83	Rafael Gómez Mena	Industriales
1983–84	Rolando Arrojo	Citricultores
1984–85	Eddy Rojas	Villa Clara
1985–86	Buenafé Nápoles	Camagüey
1986–87	Alexis Cabreja	Industriales
1987–88	Teófilo Pérez	Camagüey
1987–88	Alexander Ramos	Isla de la Juventud
1988–89	Idalberto Castillo	Granma
1989–90	Rubén Rodríguez	Santiago de Cuba
1990–91	José Emilio Lamarque	Holguín
1991–92	René Espín	Metropolitanos
1991–92	Jorge Díaz Olano	Villa Clara
1992–93	Vaisel Acosta	Matanzas
1993–94	Reniel Capote	Pinar del Río
1994–95	Larry Rodríguez	La Habana
1995–96	Arael Sánchez	Villa Clara
1996–97	Maique Quintero	Industriales
1997–98	Yasser Gómez	Industriales
1998–99	None	—
1999-00	Yoandry Urgellés	Metropolitanos
2000–01	Pedro José Rodríguez, Jr.	Cienfuegos
2001–02	Kendry Morales	Industriales
2002–03	Yordanis Samón	Granma
2003–04	Frank Montieth	Industriales
2004–05	Yadier Pedroso	La Habana
2005–06	Alberto Soto	Granma
2006–07	Raiko Olivares	Industriales
2007–08	Yosvani Pérez Torres	Villa Clara
2008–09	Michel Gorguet	Guantánamo
2009–10	Yusef Amador	Metropolitanos
2010–11	Gerardo Concepción	Industriales
2011–12	Carlos Juan Viera	Las Tunas
2012–13	Norge Luis Ruiz	Camagüey
2013–14	Vladimir Gutierrez	Pinar del Rio
2014–15	Alfredo Rodríguez	Isla de la Juventud
2015–16	Yoandy Cruz	Pinar del Rio
2016–17	Eliecer Griñán	Ciego de Ávila
2017–18	Ángel Sánchez	Las Tunas
2018–19	César Prieto	Cienfuegos
2019–20	Loidel Chapellí Jr	Camagüey
2020–21	Marlon Vega	Mayabeque
2022	Danny Oramas	Cienfuegos
2023	Rafael Perdomo	Industriales
2024	Ediel Ponce	Ciego de Ávila
