= Cuban National Series Most Valuable Player Award =

The following is a list of most valuable players (Spanish: jugadores mas valiosos or jugadores mas destacados) in the Cuban National Series since its inception in 1961.

== List ==
Ed.	Year	MVP	Position	Team
1	1962	Erwin Walters	OF	Occidentales
2	1963	Modesto Verdura	P	Azucareros
3	1964	Pedro Chávez	1B-OF	Occidentales
4	1965	Urbano González	2B	Industriales
5	1966	Lino Betancourt	1B	Henequeneros
6	1967	Pedro Chávez	1B-OF	Industriales
7	1968	Eulogio Osorio	OF	Habana
8	1969	Wilfredo Sánchez	OF	Henequeneros
9	1970	Wilfredo Sánchez	OF	Henequeneros
10	1971	Antonio Jiménez	P	Industriales
11	1972	Agustín Marquetti	1B	Industriales
12	1973	Armando Capiró	OF	Habana
13	1974	Antonio Muñoz	1B	Azucareros
14	1975	Walfrido Ruiz	P	Agricultores
15	1976	Omar Carrero	P	Ganaderos
16	1977	Isidro Pérez	P	Azucareros
17	1978	Fernando Sánchez	OF	Henequeneros
18	1979	Wilfredo Sánchez	OF	Citricultores
19	1980	Pedro José Rodríguez	3B	Cienfuegos
20	1981	Rogelio García	P	Vegueros
21	1982	Fernando Hernández	OF	Vegueros
22	1983	Lázaro Junco	OF	Citricultores
23	1984	Luis Giraldo Casanova	OF	Vegueros
24	1985	Omar Linares	3B	Vegueros
25	1986	Lázaro Vargas	3B	Industriales
26	1987	Javier Méndez	OF	Industriales
27	1988	Pedro Luis Rodríguez	C	Havana
28	1989	Orestes Kindelán	OF-C	Santiago de Cuba
29	1990	Omar Linares	3B	Vegueros
30	1991	Lázaro Madera	OF	Vegueros
31	1992	Jorge Luis Valdés	P	Henequeneros
32	1993	Omar Linares	3B	Pinar del Rio
33	1994	Lourdes Gourriel	OF-1B	Sancti Spíritus
34	1995	Amado Zamora	OF	Villa Clara
35	1996	Jorge Fumero	P	Industriales
36	1997	José Estrada	OF	Matanzas
37	1998	Oscar Machado	OF	Villa Clara
38	1999	Michel Enríquez	3B	Isla de la Juventud
39	2000	Norge Luis Vera	P	Santiago de Cuba
40	2001	Maels Rodríguez	P	Sancti Spíritus
41	2002	Michel Abreu	1B	Matanzas
42	2003	Javier Méndez	OF	Industriales
43	2004	Osmani Urrutia	OF	Las Tunas
44	2005	Yulieski Gurriel	3B	Sancti Spíritus
45	2006	Yulieski Gurriel	3B	Sancti Spiritus
46	2007	Osmani Urrutia	OF	Las Tunas
47	2008	Alexeis Bell	OF	Santiago de Cuba
48	2009	Alfredo Despaigne	OF	Granma
49	2010	Alfredo Despaigne	OF	Granma
50	2011	José Dariel Abreu	1B	Cienfuegos
51	2012	Alfredo Despaigne	OF	Granma
52	2013	Freddy Álvarez	P	Villa Clara
53	2014	Yosvani Torres	P	Pinar del Rio
54	2015	Alfredo Despaigne	OF	Granma
55	2016	José Adolis García	OF	Ciego de Ávila
56	2017	Lázaro Blanco	P	Granma
57	2018	Rafael Viñales	1B	Las Tunas
58	2019	Jorge Alomá	SS	Las Tunas
59	2020	Yordanis Alarcón	C	Las Tunas
60	2021	Lisbán Correa	1B	Industriales
61	2022	Marlon Vega		Granma
62	2023	Osday Silva		Santiago de Cuba
63	2024	José Amaury Noroña		Matanzas
64	2026	Yasiel González	OF	Holguín

== See also ==
- Baseball awards#Cuba

== Sources ==
- "Ganadores del premio Jugador Más Valioso del béisbol cubano". Cubasi.cu.
