= 1997–98 Cuban National Series =

Pinar del Río won its second straight Cuban National Series. Perennial cellar-dwellers Guantánamo and Ciego de Ávila made the playoffs, where they were promptly swept in three games.

== Standings ==
=== Group A ===
Team	W	L	Pct.	GB
Pinar del Río	56	34	.622	-
Metropolitanos	52	38	.577	4
Isla de la Juventud	46	44	.511	10
Matanzas	39	51	.433	17

=== Group B ===
Team	W	L	Pct.	GB
La Habana	54	36	.600	-
Industriales	47	43	.522	7
Sancti Spíritus	27	63	.300	27
Cienfuegos	27	63	.300	27

=== Group C ===
Team	W	L	Pct.	GB
Camagüey	57	33	.633	-
Ciego de Ávila	57	33	.633	-
Villa Clara	47	43	.522	11
Las Tunas	32	58	.355	25

=== Group D ===
Team	W	L	Pct.	GB
Santiago de Cuba	61	28	.685	-
Guantánamo	52	38	.578	9.5
Holguín	34	55	.382	27
Granma	31	59	.344	30.5

== Playoffs ==
Quarterfinals
A1	Pinar del Río	3
B2	Industriales	1
West
B1	Habana	3
A2	Metropolitanos	2
C1	Camagüey	3
C2	Ciego de Ávila	0
East
D1	Santiago de Cuba	3
D2	Guantánamo	0

Semifinals
A1	Pinar del Río	4
B1	Habana	3
C1	Camagüey	3
D1	Santiago de Cuba	4

Finals
A1	Pinar del Río	4
D1	Santiago de Cuba	1
