= 1992–93 Cuban National Series =

Baseball season in Cuba

1992–93 Cuban National Series Serie Nacional de Béisbol 1992–93
- League: Cuban National Series
- Sport: Baseball
- Games: 65
- Teams: 16

Group A
- Best record: Pinar del Río (47–18)

Group B
- Best record: Industriales (45–20)

Group C
- Best record: Villa Clara (42–23)

Group D
- Best record: Santiago de Cuba (41–24)

Postseason
- Finals champions: Villa Clara
- Runners-up: Pinar del Río

SNB seasons
- ← 1991–92 1993–94 →

The 32nd season of the Cuban National Series saw a slight contraction of the league. Two of the Cuban provinces that had been fielding two teams each since the 1977–78 season, Pinar del Río Province and Matanzas Province, began fielding one team each. Vegueros and Forestales became the Pinar del Río team, while Henequeneros and Citricultores became the Matanzas team. Ciudad de La Habana Province (Havana city) continued to field two teams, Industriales and Metropolitanos.

The league's now-16 teams were divided into four groups, and each team's regular-season schedule was increased from 48 to 65 games. Each group winner advanced to the postseason. Pinar del Río and Villa Clara advanced to the championship series, which was won by Villa Clara in a seven-game series.

== Standings ==
=== Group A ===
| Team | W | L | Pct. | GB |
|---|---|---|---|---|
| Pinar del Río | 47 | 18 | .723 | - |
| Matanzas | 35 | 30 | .538 | 12 |
| Metropolitanos | 32 | 33 | .492 | 15 |
| Isla de la Juventud | 16 | 49 | .246 | 31 |

=== Group B ===
| Team | W | L | Pct. | GB |
|---|---|---|---|---|
| Industriales | 45 | 20 | .692 | - |
| La Habana | 31 | 34 | .476 | 14 |
| Sancti Spíritus | 26 | 39 | .400 | 19 |
| Cienfuegos | 25 | 40 | .384 | 20 |

=== Group C ===
| Team | W | L | Pct. | GB |
|---|---|---|---|---|
| Villa Clara | 42 | 23 | .646 | - |
| Camagüey | 33 | 32 | .507 | 9 |
| Las Tunas | 28 | 37 | .430 | 14 |
| Ciego de Ávila | 20 | 45 | .307 | 22 |

=== Group D ===
| Team | W | L | Pct. | GB |
|---|---|---|---|---|
| Santiago de Cuba | 41 | 24 | .630 | - |
| Granma | 39 | 26 | .600 | 2 |
| Holguín | 39 | 26 | .600 | 2 |
| Guantánamo | 21 | 44 | .323 | 20 |

== Playoffs ==
Semifinals
A | Pinar del Río | 4
B | Industriales | 0
C | Villa Clara | 4
D | Santiago de Cuba | 2

Finals
A | Pinar del Río | 3
C | Villa Clara | 4
