= 1983–84 Cuban National Series =

Baseball season in Cuba

1983–84 Cuban National Series Serie Nacional de Béisbol 1983–84
- League: Cuban National Series
- Sport: Baseball
- Games: 75
- Teams: 18

First division
- Champion: Citricultores (52–23)

Second division
- Champion: Forestales (40–35)

SNB seasons
- ← 1982–83 1984–85 →

The 23rd Cuban National Series marked the first time the league was divided into two divisions, each consisting of nine teams, after the first half of the season. The 18 teams of the league remained unchanged, but the length of schedule was increased from 51 games to 75 games.

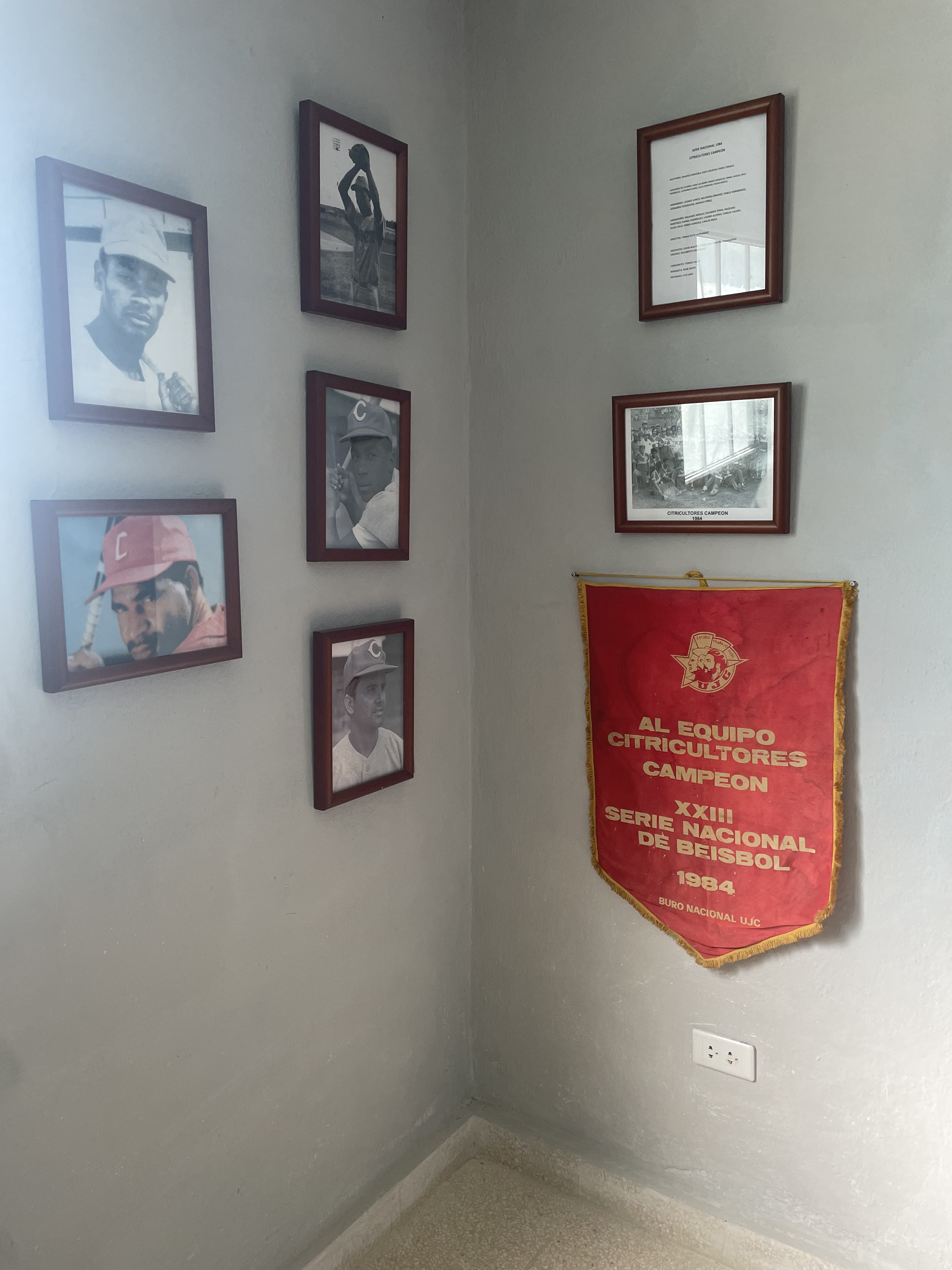
The banner of the years national series to Matanzas in the Palmar de Junco hall of fame

Citricultores, from Matanzas Province, became champion of the first division, and Forestales, from Pinar del Río Province, became champion of the second division.

== Standings ==
=== First division ===
Team	W	L	Pct.	GB
Citricultores (Matanzas)	52	23	.693	-
Industriales (Havana)	49	25	.662	2½
Villa Clara	48	27	.640	4
Camagüey	46	27	.630	5
Santiago de Cuba	47	28	.626	5
Vegueros (Pinar del Río)	44	31	.586	8
Henequeneros (Matanzas)	36	36	.500	14½
Holguín	36	39	.480	16
Sancti Spíritus	30	45	.400	22

=== Second division ===
Team	W	L	Pct.	GB
Forestales (Pinar del Río)	40	35	.533	-
La Habana	37	38	.493	3
Cienfuegos	34	40	.459	5½
Granma	34	41	.453	6
Guantánamo	34	41	.453	6
Metropolitanos (Havana)	30	43	.410	9
Isla de la Juventud	28	46	.378	11½
Ciego de Ávila	25	48	.342	14
Las Tunas	19	56	.253	21
