= 2011–12 Cuban National Series =

The 2011–12 Cuban National Series was the 51st edition of the tournament. Due to the division of La Habana Province, there were 17 teams participating. The tournament began on November 27 with a game between Ciego de Avila and Pinar del Río. The regular season finished on April 22; the final game of the playoffs was played on May 28 with Ciego de Avila beating Industriales.

== Regular season standings ==
=== West ===
Team	G	W	L	Pct.	GB	Home	Road
Matanzas	96	58	38	.605	-	35-13	23-25
Industriales	96	55	41	.573	3	31-17	24-24
Cienfuegos	96	54	42	.563	4	28-20	26-22
Sancti Spiritus	95	49	46	.516	8½	27-21	22-25
Pinar del Río	96	47	49	.490	11	26-22	21-27
Isla de la Juventud	96	39	57	.407	19	18-30	21-27
Metropolitanos	96	38	58	.396	20	18-30	20-28
Artemisa	96	36	60	.375	22	19-29	17-31
Mayabeque	96	33	63	.344	25	19-29	14-34

=== East ===
Team	G	W	L	Pct.	GB	Home	Road
Villa Clara	96	58	38	.605	-	29-19	29-19
Las Tunas	95	54	41	.569	3½	27-21	27-20
Ciego de Ávila	96	54	42	.563	4	29-19	25-23
Granma	96	54	42	.563	4	22-26	32-16
Santiago de Cuba	96	53	43	.553	5	28-20	25-23
Guantánamo	94	45	49	.479	12	23-23	22-26
Holguín	96	44	52	.459	14	25-23	19-29
Camagüey	96	43	53	.448	15	24-24	19-29

== Playoffs ==
Quarterfinals
W1	Matanzas	4
W4	Sancti Spiritus	3
West
W2	Industriales	4
W3	Cienfuegos	1
E1	Villa Clara	3
E4	Granma	4
East
E2	Las Tunas	3
E3	Ciego de Ávila	4

Semifinals
W1	Matanzas	3
W2	Industriales	4
E4	Granma	2
E3	Ciego de Ávila	4

Final
W2	Industriales	1
E3	Ciego de Ávila	4

== League leaders ==
Batting leaders
Stat	Player	Total
AVG	José Dariel Abreu (CFG)	.394
H	Yordanis Samón (GRA)	133
R	Guillermo Heredia (MAT)	91
HR	Alfredo Despaigne (GRA)	36
RBI	Alfredo Despaigne (GRA)	105

Pitching leaders
Stat	Player	Total
ERA	Pablo Milián Fernández (HOL)	1.52
W	Ismel Jimenez (SSP)	17
S	Danni Aguilera (IJV)	27
K	Odrisamer Despaigne (IND)	128
K	Yadier Pedroso (ART)	128
IP	Ismel Jimenez (LTU)	185
