= 1994–95 Cuban National Series =

Villa Clara won its third straight Cuban National Series title during the 1994-95 season.

== Standings ==
=== Group A ===
Team	W	L	Pct.	GB
Pinar del Río	41	24	.630	-
Matanzas	37	27	.578	3
Metropolitanos	29	36	.446	12
Isla de la Juventud	23	39	.370	16½

=== Group B ===
Team	W	L	Pct.	GB
La Habana	46	18	.710	-
Industriales	35	28	.555	10½
Cienfuegos	33	31	.515	13
Sancti Spíritus	23	41	.359	23

=== Group C ===
Team	W	L	Pct.	GB
Villa Clara	44	18	.709	-
Camagüey	27	38	.415	18½
Las Tunas	27	38	.415	18½
Ciego de Ávila	18	47	.276	27½

=== Group D ===
Team	W	L	Pct.	GB
Holguín	37	28	.569	-
Granma	37	28	.569	-
Santiago de Cuba	37	28	.569	-
Guantánamo	20	45	.307	17

== Playoffs ==
Semifinals
A	Pinar del Río	4
B	La Habana	0
C	Villa Clara	4
D	Holguín	0

Finals
A	Pinar del Río	3
C	Villa Clara	4
