= 1985–86 Cuban National Series =

Baseball season in Cuba

1985–86 Cuban National Series Serie Nacional de Béisbol 1985–86
- League: Cuban National Series
- Sport: Baseball
- Games: 48
- Teams: 18

Eastern zone
- Best record: Villa Clara (35–13)

Western zone
- Best record: Industriales (37–11)

Postseason

Round-robin tournament
- Champions: Industriales (6–0)
- Runners-up: Vegueros (4–2)

SNB seasons
- ← 1984–85 1986–87 →

The silver jubilee 25th season of the Cuban National Series was the first to feature a scheduled postseason, (Note: Tie-breaker series had been played to determine league champions in 1962–63 and 1971–72.) as the first-place and second-place teams from each of the new Eastern and Western divisions qualified for a round-robin tournament to determine the league champion. The 18 teams in the league remained unchanged from recent seasons, but each team's regular-season schedule was reduced from 75 games to 48 games. (Note: A team facing each of the other 8 teams in their division 6 times each yields a schedule of 48 games.)

Advancing to the playoffs were Industriales, Vegueros, Santiago de Cuba and Villa Clara. Industriales went undefeated as they swept their competitors, clinching their sixth league title via a walk-off home run by Agustín Marquetti in extra innings against Vegueros on January 19, 1986, in front of their home fans.

== Standings ==
=== Western zone ===
Team	W	L	Pct.	GB
Industriales (Havana)	37	11	.770	-
Vegueros (Pinar del Río)	33	15	.600	4
Henequeneros (Matanzas)	33	15	.600	4
Citricultores (Matanzas)	26	22	.542	11
Metropolitanos (Havana)	21	26	.446	15½
La Habana	18	30	.375	19
Forestales (Pinar del Río)	18	30	.375	19
Cienfuegos	15	32	.319	21½
Isla de la Juventud	14	34	.291	23

=== Eastern zone ===
Team	W	L	Pct.	GB
Villa Clara	35	13	.729	-
Santiago de Cuba	34	14	.708	1
Camagüey	32	16	.666	3
Ciego de Ávila	24	24	.500	11
Granma	21	27	.438	14
Sancti Spíritus	21	27	.438	14
Guantánamo	19	29	.395	16
Las Tunas	16	32	.333	19
Holguín	14	34	.291	21

== Postseason ==
Team	W	L	Pct.	GB
Industriales	6	0	1.000	-
Vegueros	4	2	.667	2
Santiago de Cuba	1	5	.167	5
Villa Clara	1	5	.167	5
