= 2008–09 Cuban National Series =

The 48th Cuban National Series was won by La Habana over Villa Clara. Ciego de Ávila, who had the best regular season record, lost in the semifinals. Defending champion Santiago de Cuba were ousted in the first round.

== Regular season standings ==
=== West ===
Team	W	L	PCT.	GB
La Habana	57	33	.633	-
Pinar del Río	54	36	.600	3
Sancti Spíritus	48	42	.533	9
Isla de la Juventud	43	47	.478	14
Matanzas	39	51	.433	18
Industriales	37	53	.411	20
Cienfuegos	34	56	.378	23
Metropolitanos	33	57	.367	24

=== East ===
Team	W	L	PCT.	GB
Ciego de Ávila	64	26	.711	-
Santiago de Cuba	57	33	.633	7
Villa Clara	53	37	.589	11
Holguín	47	43	.522	17
Guantánamo	43	47	.478	21
Camagüey	41	49	.456	23
Las Tunas	36	54	.400	28
Granma	34	56	.378	30

== Playoffs ==
Quarterfinals
W1	La Habana	4
W4	Isla de la Juventud	1
West
W2	Pinar del Río	4
W3	Sancti Spíritus	1
E1	Ciego de Ávila	4
E4	Holguín	0
East
E2	Santiago de Cuba	3
E3	Villa Clara	4

Semifinals
W1	La Habana	4
W2	Pinar del Río	2
E1	Ciego de Ávila	1
E3	Villa Clara	4

Final
W1	La Habana	4
E3	Villa Clara	1
