= 1980–81 Cuban National Series =

Baseball season in Cuba

1980–81 Cuban National Series Serie Nacional de Béisbol 1980–81
- League: Cuban National Series
- Sport: Baseball
- Games: 51
- Teams: 18

Regular season
- Champion: Vegueros (36–15)

SNB seasons
- ← 1979–80 1981–82 →

The 20th Cuban National Series saw Vegueros, from Pinar del Río Province, win its second title, with Villa Clara and Citricultores each finishing three games behind. The 18 teams of the league, each with a 51-game schedule, remained unchanged from the prior season.

== Standings ==
Team	W	L	Pct.	GB
Vegueros (Pinar del Río)	36	15	.705	-
Villa Clara	33	18	.647	3
Citricultores (Matanzas)	33	18	.647	3
Industriales (Havana)	32	19	.627	4
Forestales (Pinar del Río)	31	20	.607	5
Cienfuegos	30	21	.588	6
Sancti Spíritus	28	23	.540	8
Guantánamo	26	25	.509	10
Henequeneros (Matanzas)	25	26	.490	11
Santiago de Cuba	25	26	.490	11
Granma	24	27	.470	12
Metropolitanos (Havana)	23	28	.450	13
Camagüey	23	28	.450	13
Holguín	22	29	.431	14
Isla de la Juventud	20	31	.392	16
Ciego de Ávila	19	32	.372	17
La Habana	18	33	.352	18
Las Tunas	11	40	.215	25
