= 1996–97 Cuban National Series =

The 36th Cuban National Series saw Pinar del Río post the league's best regular-season record. In the playoffs, the Vegueros, led by Omar Linares, went undefeated, sweeping both best-of-seven series.

== Standings ==
=== Group A ===
Team	W	L	Pct.	GB
Pinar del Río	50	15	.769	-
Metropolitanos	42	23	.646	8
Matanzas	39	26	.600	11
Isla de la Juventud	31	34	.476	19

=== Group B ===
Team	W	L	Pct.	GB
Industriales	33	32	.520	-
La Habana	30	35	.461	4
Cienfuegos	25	40	.384	9
Sancti Spíritus	16	49	.246	18

=== Group C ===
Team	W	L	Pct.	GB
Villa Clara	37	27	.578	-
Camagüey	33	32	.507	4 1/2
Las Tunas	28	37	.430	9 1/2
Ciego de Ávila	20	45	.307	17 1/2

=== Group D ===
Team	W	L	Pct.	GB
Santiago de Cuba	49	16	.753	-
Holguín	34	31	.523	15
Granma	28	37	.430	21
Guantánamo	23	41	.359	25 1/2

== Playoffs ==
Semifinals
A	Pinar del Río	4
B	Industriales	0
C	Villa Clara	4
D	Santiago de Cuba	2

Finals
A	Pinar del Río	4
C	Villa Clara	0
