= 1982–83 Cuban National Series =

Baseball season in Cuba

1982–83 Cuban National Series Serie Nacional de Béisbol 1982–83
- League: Cuban National Series
- Sport: Baseball
- Games: 51
- Teams: 18

Regular season
- Champion: Villa Clara (41–8)

SNB seasons
- ← 1981–82 1983–84 →

The 22nd season of the Cuban National Series was dominated by Villa Clara, who finished with a seven-game lead over second-place finishers Citricultores and Camagüey. The league's 51-game schedule and 18 teams remained unchanged from the prior season.

== Standings ==
Team	W	L	Pct.	GB
Villa Clara	41	8	.836	-
Citricultores (Matanzas)	35	16	.686	7
Camagüey	35	16	.686	7
Industriales (Havana)	31	16	.659	9
Vegueros (Pinar del Río)	33	18	.647	9
Henequeneros (Matanzas)	28	20	.583	12½
Forestales (Pinar del Río)	25	24	.510	16
Ciego de Ávila	25	26	.490	17
Santiago de Cuba	24	25	.489	17
La Habana	23	26	.469	18
Guantánamo	22	29	.431	20
Cienfuegos	20	28	.416	20½
Sancti Spíritus	21	30	.411	21
Granma	19	32	.372	23
Isla de la Juventud	19	32	.372	23
Metropolitanos (Havana)	16	33	.326	25
Holguín	16	33	.326	25
Las Tunas	15	36	.294	27
