= 1978–79 Cuban National Series =

Baseball season in Cuba

1978–79 Cuban National Series Serie Nacional de Béisbol 1978–79
- League: Cuban National Series
- Sport: Baseball
- Games: 51
- Teams: 18

Regular season
- Champion: Sancti Spíritus (39–12)

SNB seasons
- ← 1977–78 1979–80 →

The 18th season of the Cuban National Series saw Sancti Spíritus win its first (and to date, only) championship, edging Villa Clara and defending champion Vegueros to win the league with a 39–12 record.

== Standings ==
The league's size was again 18 teams: 11 provinces fielded a single team each, three provinces fielded two teams each, and the special administrative area of Isla de la Juventud (renamed from Isla de Pinos) fielded a team.

| Team | W | L | Pct. | GB |
|---|---|---|---|---|
| Sancti Spíritus | 39 | 12 | .764 | - |
| Villa Clara | 36 | 14 | .720 | 2½ |
| Vegueros (Pinar del Río) | 35 | 14 | .714 | 3 |
| Cienfuegos | 31 | 20 | .607 | 8 |
| Forestales (Pinar del Río) | 30 | 20 | .600 | 8½ |
| Camagüey | 28 | 21 | .571 | 10 |
| Granma | 27 | 21 | .500 | 10½ |
| Citricultores (Matanzas) | 28 | 23 | .540 | 11 |
| Ciego de Ávila | 26 | 25 | .509 | 13 |
| Metropolitanos (Havana) | 25 | 25 | .500 | 13½ |
| Santiago de Cuba | 23 | 28 | .450 | 16 |
| Industriales (Havana) | 22 | 27 | .440 | 16 |
| Henequeneros (Matanzas) | 22 | 29 | .431 | 17 |
| Guantánamo | 21 | 29 | .420 | 17½ |
| Holguín | 19 | 32 | .372 | 20 |
| Las Tunas | 15 | 35 | .300 | 23½ |
| La Habana | 14 | 36 | .280 | 24½ |
| Isla de la Juventud | 10 | 40 | .200 | 28½ |
