= 1993–94 Cuban National Series =

The 33rd Cuban National Series saw further dominance from the previous year's group winners: Pinar del Río, Industriales, Villa Clara and Santiago de Cuba. Among them, only Pinar del Río won its group by fewer than seven games, in a 65-game season.

After winning their semifinal series, Villa Clara and Industriales fought to a seventh and deciding game. Villa Clara ultimately won, after Jorge Fumero knocked in Ariel Pestano for the game's winning run.

== Standings ==
=== Group A ===
Team	W	L	Pct.	GB
Pinar del Río	39	23	.629	-
Matanzas	39	26	.600	1½
Isla de la Juventud	35	30	.538	5½
Metropolitanos	22	43	.338	18½

=== Group B ===
Team	W	L	Pct.	GB
Industriales	43	22	.661	-
Sancti Spíritus	36	29	.553	7
La Habana	35	30	.538	8
Cienfuegos	20	45	.307	23

=== Group C ===
Team	W	L	Pct.	GB
Villa Clara	43	22	.661	-
Camagüey	35	30	.538	8
Las Tunas	28	37	.430	15
Ciego de Ávila	18	44	.290	23½

=== Group D ===
Team	W	L	Pct.	GB
Santiago de Cuba	43	22	.661	-
Holguín	33	32	.507	10
Granma	32	33	.492	11
Guantánamo	16	49	.246	27

== Playoffs ==
Semifinals
A	Pinar del Río	2
B	Industriales	4
C	Villa Clara	4
D	Santiago de Cuba	2

Finals
B	Industriales	3
C	Villa Clara	4
