= 2010–11 Cuban National Series =

The 2010–11 Cuban National Series was the 50th edition of the tournament. It began on November 28 with a game between Villa Clara and Industriales, with Villa Clara winning, 6-5. The All-Star Game was played on February 6, 2011. The regular season finished on March 24.

== Regular season standings ==
=== West ===
Team	G	W	L	Pct.	GB	Home	Road
Cienfuegos	90	59	31	.656	-	31-14	28-17
Pinar del Río	89	50	39	.562	8 1/2	28-16	22-23
Sancti Spíritus	90	49	41	.544	10	32-13	17-28
La Habana	90	49	41	.544	10	28-17	21-24
Industriales	90	44	46	.489	15	24-21	20-25
Isla de la Juventud	90	38	52	.422	21	21-24	17-28
Matanzas	89	34	55	.382	24 1/2	18-26	16-29
Metropolitanos	90	28	62	.311	31	13-32	15-30

=== East ===
Team	G	W	L	Pct.	GB	Home	Road
Ciego de Ávila	90	55	35	.611	-	33-12	22-23
Granma	90	53	37	.589	2	30-15	23-22
Guantánamo	90	51	39	.567	4	30-15	21-24
Villa Clara	89	50	39	.562	4 1/2	27-18	23-21
Santiago de Cuba	90	45	45	.500	10	24-21	21-24
Las Tunas	90	43	47	.478	12	24-21	19-26
Camagüey	90	41	49	.456	14	21-24	20-25
Holguín	89	29	60	.326	25 1/2	17-28	12-32

== Playoffs ==
Quarterfinals
W1	Cienfuegos	4
W4	La Habana	1
West
W2	Pinar del Río	4
W3	Sancti Spíritus	2
E1	Ciego de Ávila	4
E4	Villa Clara	3
East
E2	Granma	4
E3	Guantánamo	3

Semifinals
W1	Cienfuegos	2
W2	Pinar del Río	4
E1	Ciego de Ávila	4
E2	Granma	2

Final
W2	Pinar del Río	4
E1	Ciego de Ávila	2

== League leaders ==
Batting leaders
Stat	Player	Total
AVG	José Dariel Abreu (CFG)	.453
H	Dainer Moreira (GTM)	130
R	Yoenis Céspedes (GRA)	89
HR	Yoenis Céspedes (GRA); Jose D. Abreu (CFG)	33
RBI	Yoenis Céspedes (GRA)	99

Pitching leaders
Stat	Player	Total
ERA	Freddy Asiel Álvarez (VCL)	1.89
W	Norberto González (CFG)	13
S	Duniel Ibarra (CFG)	27
K	Wilber Pérez (IJV)	97
IP	Yoelkis Cruz (LTU)	153 1/3
