= 1986–87 Cuban National Series =

Baseball season in Cuba

1986–87 Cuban National Series Serie Nacional de Béisbol 1986–87
- League: Cuban National Series
- Sport: Baseball
- Games: 48
- Teams: 18

Eastern zone
- Best record: Santiago de Cuba (35–13)

Western zone
- Best record: Vegueros (34–13)

Postseason

Round-robin tournament
- Champions: Vegueros (5–1)
- Runners-up: Santiago de Cuba (3–3)

SNB seasons
- ← 1985–86 1987–88 →

The 26th Cuban National Series was the second season the league held a postseason round-robin tournament to determine a champion. The four teams that qualified were the same as in the prior season: Vegueros from Pinar del Río Province, Industriales of Havana, Santiago de Cuba, and Villa Clara. Vegueros captured the championship by winning five of their six postseason games. The league's 18 teams and 48-game regular-season schedule were unchanged from the prior season.

== Standings ==
=== Western zone ===
Team	W	L	Pct.	GB
Vegueros (Pinar del Río)	34	13	.723	—
Industriales (Havana)	30	17	.638	4
Metropolitanos (Havana)	28	20	.583	6.5
La Habana	26	20	.565	7.5
Citricultores (Matanzas)	23	22	.511	10
Cienfuegos	24	23	.510	10
Henequeneros (Matanzas)	20	28	.416	14.5
Forestales (Pinar del Río)	16	32	.333	18.5
Isla de la Juventud	10	36	.217	23.5

=== Eastern zone ===
Team	W	L	Pct.	GB
Santiago de Cuba	35	13	.729	—
Villa Clara	33	14	.702	1.5
Granma	29	19	.604	6
Ciego de Ávila	26	22	.541	9
Camagüey	24	23	.510	10.5
Las Tunas	19	29	.395	16
Holguín	17	31	.354	18
Sancti Spíritus	16	32	.333	19
Guantánamo	16	32	.333	19

== Postseason ==
Team	W	L	Pct.	GB
Vegueros	5	1	.833	—
Santiago de Cuba	3	3	.500	2
Villa Clara	2	4	.333	3
Industriales	2	4	.333	3
