= 1981–82 Cuban National Series =

Baseball season in Cuba

1981–82 Cuban National Series Serie Nacional de Béisbol 1981–82
- League: Cuban National Series
- Sport: Baseball
- Games: 51
- Teams: 18

Regular season
- Champion: Vegueros (36–15)

SNB seasons
- ← 1980–81 1982–83 →

In the 21st season of Cuban National Series, Vegueros, from Pinar del Río Province retained their championship title, finishing one game ahead of Citricultores from Matanzas Province. Metropolitanos finished well ahead of its Havana rival, Industriales. The league’s teams and schedule length remained unchanged from the previous season.

In March 1982, the league was marred by a gambling-related corruption scandal that led to the suspension and arrest of at least 17 players and coaches.

== Standings ==
Team	W	L	Pct.	GB
Vegueros (Pinar del Río)	36	15	.705	-
Citricultores (Matanzas)	35	16	.686	1
Metropolitanos (Havana)	34	17	.666	2
Forestales (Pinar del Río)	33	18	.647	3
Cienfuegos	29	22	.568	7
Henequeneros (Matanzas)	28	23	.540	8
Industriales (Havana)	27	24	.529	9
Granma	26	25	.509	10
Guantánamo	26	25	.509	10
Villa Clara	24	27	.470	12
Camagüey	23	28	.450	13
La Habana	22	29	.431	14
Ciego de Ávila	22	29	.431	14
Sancti Spíritus	21	30	.411	15
Santiago de Cuba	21	30	.411	15
Isla de la Juventud	21	30	.411	15
Holguín	17	34	.333	19
Las Tunas	14	37	.270	22
