= Jorge Fuentes =

Cuban baseball manager

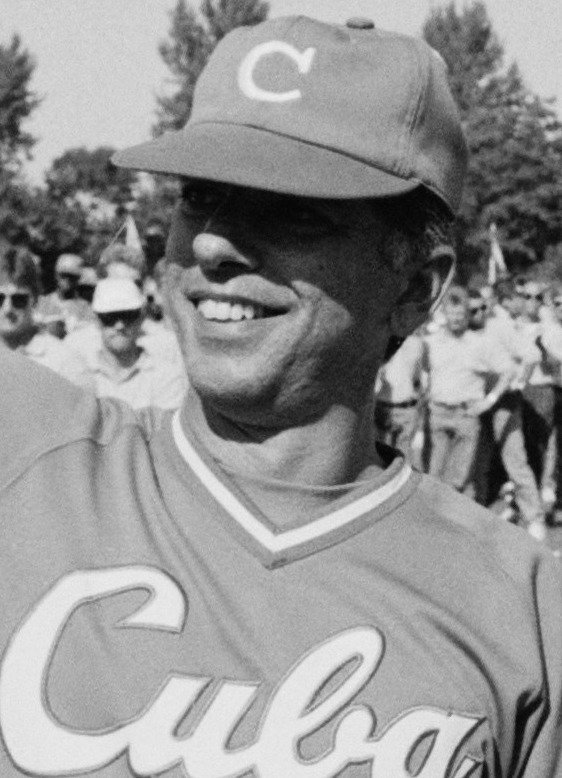
- Fuentes in 1990
- Manager
- Born: 16 January 1950 (age 76); San Cristóbal, Pinar del Río, Cuba
Medals
Men's baseball
Manager for Cuba
Olympic Games
Gold medal – first place	1992 Barcelona	Team
Gold medal – first place	1996 Atlanta	Team
Pan American Games
Gold medal – first place	1991 Havana	Team
Gold medal – first place	1995 Mar del Plata	Team
Central American and Caribbean Games
Gold medal – first place	1990 Mexico City	Team
Gold medal – first place	1993 Ponce	Team
Baseball World Cup
Gold medal – first place	1988 Italy	Team
Gold medal – first place	1990 Edmonton	Team
Gold medal – first place	1994 Nicaragua	Team
Intercontinental Cup
Gold medal – first place	1987 Havana	Team
Gold medal – first place	1989 San Juan	Team
Gold medal – first place	1993 Italy	Team
Gold medal – first place	1995 Havana	Team
Silver medal – second place	1997 Barcelona	Team

Jorge Fuentes Fleitas (born 16 January 1950) is a Cuban baseball manager. He is the manager with the most wins in Cuban baseball having won five Cuban National Series in 1982, 1985, 1987, 1988 and 1997 and five Selective Series with Pinar del Río. As manager of the Cuban national team he won two Olympic gold medals in Barcelona 1992 and Atlanta 1996 and three Baseball World Cups in 1988, 1990 and 1994 as well as other continental and regional titles.

== Career ==
Fuentes was born on 16 January 1950 in San Cristóbal, Pinar del Río Province, Cuba. He studied at the Universidad de Ciencias de la Cultura Física y el Deporte Manuel Fajardo (Manuel Fajardo University of Physical Culture and Sports Sciences) where he graduated with a Bachelor's Degree in Physical Culture, specialized in baseball.

Having no career as a player, Fuentes made his debut as coach in 1974 as first base coach for Pinar del Río, after spending a couple of years in Mexico working with the Tigres de México. In 1981 he was appointed manager of Pinar del Río and won the 1981–82 Cuban National Series and 1982 Selective Series in the first season of his managerial career. Fuentes led Pinar del Río to three more national titles in 1984–85, 1986–87 and 1987–88.

In October 1987, Fuentes was appointed as manager of the Cuban national baseball team ahead of the 1987 Intercontinental Cup. The Cuban team won the tournament. He later won the 1988 Baseball World Cup, 1989 Intercontinental Cup, 1990 Central American and Caribbean Games, 1990 Baseball World Cup, 1991 Pan American Games, 1992 Summer Olympics, 1993 Central American and Caribbean Games, 1993 Intercontinental Cup, 1994 Baseball World Cup, 1995 Pan American Games, 1995 Intercontinental Cup and 1996 Summer Olympics.

After losing the gold medal to Japan at the 1997 Intercontinental Cup, Fuentes was dismissed as manager of the Cuban national team.

Fuentes managed the Nicaragua national baseball team at the 2005 Baseball World Cup, held in the Netherlands. Later that year, he managed Tigres de Chinandega in the 2005–06 Nicaraguan Professional Baseball League, leading the team to its first championship over the Fieras del San Fernando.

In November 2013, Fuentes was appointed manager of the Piratas de Campeche of the Mexican League. He was fired on 22 April 2014 after leading the Piratas to a 56–53 record and he was replaced by Roque Sánchez as interim manager.
