= 1984–85 Cuban National Series =

Baseball season in Cuba

1984–85 Cuban National Series Serie Nacional de Béisbol 1984–85
- League: Cuban National Series
- Sport: Baseball
- Games: 75
- Teams: 18

First division
- Champion: Vegueros (57–18)

Second division
- Champion: Forestales (39–36)

SNB seasons
- ← 1983–84 1985–86 →

The 24th Cuban National Series saw Vegueros of Pinar del Río Province win the title, outdistancing Camagüey by seven games. The Vegueros roster included notable players Luis Casanova, Omar Ajete, and Omar Linares. Forestales, also from Pinar del Río, again finished atop the second division.

As in the prior season, the league split into two divisions of nine teams after the first half of the season. The 18 teams of the league and the 75-game schedule remained unchanged. This was the last time the league did not have a postseason to determine its champion.

== Standings ==
=== First division ===
Team	W	L	Pct.	GB
Vegueros (Pinar del Río)	57	18	.760	–
Camagüey	50	25	.666	7
La Habana	46	29	.613	11
Villa Clara	46	29	.613	11
Santiago de Cuba	45	30	.600	12
Industriales (Havana)	44	31	.586	13
Citricultores (Matanzas)	43	32	.573	14
Guantánamo	42	33	.560	15
Cienfuegos	32	43	.426	25

=== Second division ===
Team	W	L	Pct.	GB
Forestales (Pinar del Río)	39	36	.520	–
Henequeneros (Matanzas)	37	38	.493	2
Sancti Spíritus	32	42	.432	6
Ciego de Ávila	31	44	.413	8
Granma	31	44	.413	8
Metropolitanos (Havana)	30	44	.405	8½
Las Tunas	24	51	.320	15
Isla de la Juventud	23	52	.306	16
Holguín	22	53	.293	17
