= 1987–88 Cuban National Series =

Baseball season in Cuba

1987–88 Cuban National Series Serie Nacional de Béisbol 1987–88
- League: Cuban National Series
- Sport: Baseball
- Games: 48
- Teams: 18

Eastern zone
- Best record: Santiago de Cuba (40–8)

Western zone
- Best record: La Habana (39–9)

Postseason

Round-robin tournament
- Champions: Vegueros (5–1)
- Runners-up: La Habana & Santiago de Cuba (3–3)

SNB seasons
- ← 1986–87 1988–89 →

In the 27th season of the Cuban National Series, Vegueros, from Pinar del Río Province, repeated as champions. La Habana and Santiago de Cuba both won at least 80% of their regular-season games, but Vegueros, with an all-star lineup including Luis Casanova and Omar Linares, prevailed in the postseason. Camagüey advanced to the four-team round-robin tournament for the first time, but lost all but one of their games. The 18 teams within the league, each playing a 48-game regular-season schedule, remained unchanged from recent seasons.

== Standings ==
=== Western zone ===
Team	W	L	Pct.	GB
La Habana	39	9	.800	-
Vegueros (Pinar del Río)	35	13	.729	4
Industriales (Havana)	34	14	.708	5
Henequeneros (Matanzas)	26	22	.541	13
Metropolitanos (Havana)	22	26	.458	17
Cienfuegos	22	26	.458	17
Forestales (Pinar del Río)	18	30	.375	21
Isla de la Juventud	10	38	.208	29
Citricultores (Matanzas)	10	38	.208	29

=== Eastern zone ===
Team	W	L	Pct.	GB
Santiago de Cuba	40	8	.833	-
Camagüey	29	19	.604	11
Granma	29	19	.604	11
Villa Clara	25	23	.520	15
Las Tunas	22	26	.458	18
Ciego de Ávila	20	28	.416	20
Sancti Spíritus	20	28	.416	20
Holguín	17	31	.354	23
Guantánamo	14	34	.291	26

== Postseason ==
Team	W	L	Pct.	GB
Vegueros	5	1	.833	-
Santiago de Cuba	3	3	.500	2
La Habana	3	3	.500	2
Camagüey	1	5	.167	4
