= Norberto González =

Cuban baseball player (born 1979)

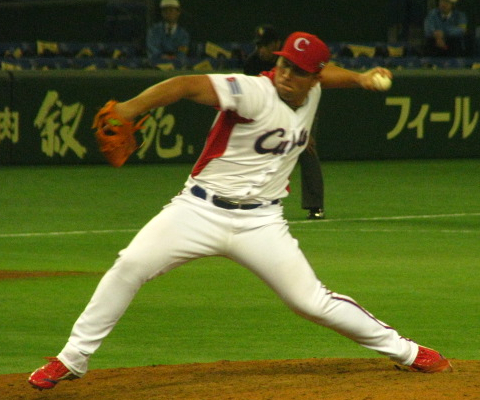
- González pitching for the Cuban national team at the 2013 World Baseball Classic
- Pitcher
- Born: 10 October 1979 (age 46); Cienfuegos, Cienfuegos Province, Cuba
- Bats: Left Throws: Left

Teams
- Cienfuegos (1998–2013; 2015–2017)
Medals
Men's baseball
Representing Cuba
World Baseball Classic
| Silver medal – second place | 2006 San Diego | Team |
Olympic Games
| Gold medal – first place | 2004 Athens | Team |
| Silver medal – second place | 2008 Beijing | Team |
Baseball World Cup
| Gold medal – first place | 2005 Rotterdam | Team |
| Silver medal – second place | 2007 Taipei | Team |
Intercontinental Cup
| Gold medal – first place | 2006 Taichung | Team |
Pan American Games
| Gold medal – first place | 2003 Santo Domingo | Team |
| Gold medal – first place | 2007 Rio de Janeiro | Team |
| Bronze medal – third place | 2011 Guadalajara | Team |

Norberto González Miranda (born 10 October 1979) is a former baseball player who was a left-handed pitcher for the Cuban national baseball team and Cienfuegos of the Cuban National Series, where he played for 18 seasons.

Representing Cuba, González was a two-time Olympic medalist, winning gold at the 2004 Athens Olympics and silver at the 2008 Beijing Olympics. He also won a silver medal at the inaugural edition of the World Baseball Classic in 2006.

== Career ==
González was born on 10 October 1979 in the city of Cienfuegos, Cuba. He made his debut in the Cuban National Series in 1998 with Cienfuegos.

In the 2005–06 Cuban National Series, pitching alongside national team stalwarts Yosvani Pérez and Adiel Palma, González maintained a 3.97 ERA and notched 90 strikeouts in 133 innings. However, his record was only 6–10, as Cienfuegos stumbled to a 35–54 record. In 2009, he reached 100 wins in the Cuban National Series.

González announced his retirement at the end of the 2012–13 Cuban National Series after 16 seasons with Cienfuegos, and a record of 139 wins and 121 losses. However, in April 2014 it was reported that González would join Italian Baseball League team Netunno 2, where he played in 2014 and 2015.

== International career ==
In 2006, González was selected to represent Cuba at the inaugural World Baseball Classic, where he played as a reliever. He substituted Vicyohandri Odelín (who had replaced starter Ormari Romero) in the final game against Japan in the first inning after Romero and Odelín allowed four runs. He pitched 3.1 innings, giving up no runs, and was replaced by Yadier Pedroso in the fifth inning. Cuba would go on to lose the game 6–10.

González was part of the Cuban team that participated in the 2009 World Baseball Classic and 2013 World Baseball Classic.

== Personal life ==
González has two sons, Andy and Alex, who also play baseball. In June 2024, he and his sons left Cuba for the Dominican Republic, where they settled in Santo Domingo to train at the Yuan Pino Academy, hoping to sign with a Major League Baseball team.
