= Adonis García =

Cuban baseball player (born 1985)

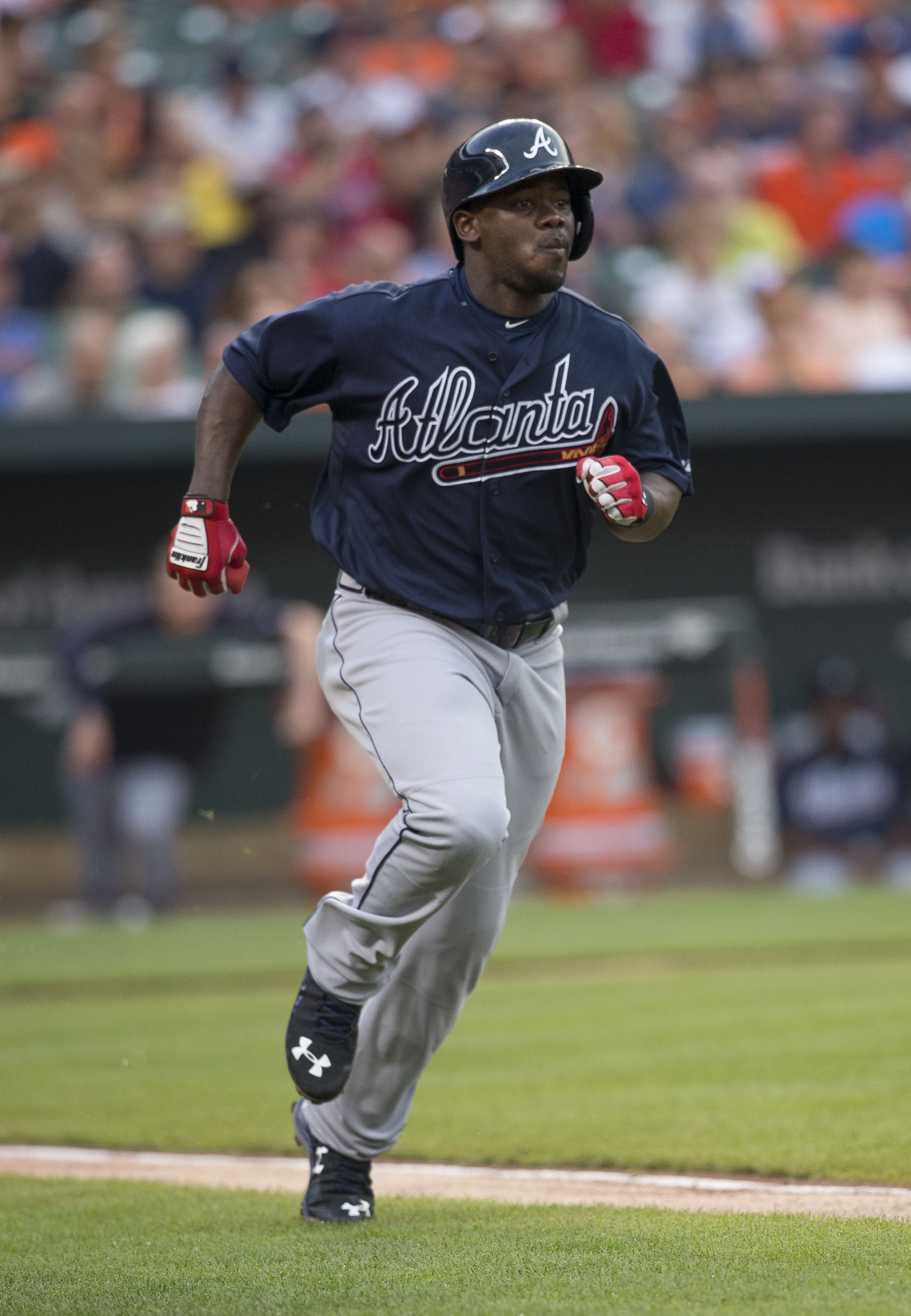
- Garcia with the Atlanta Braves in 2015
- Third baseman
- Born: April 12, 1985 (age 41); Ciego de Ávila, Cuba
- Batted: Right Threw: Right

Professional debut
- MLB: May 19, 2015, for the Atlanta Braves
- KBO: March 24, 2018, for the LG Twins

Last appearance
- MLB: October 1, 2017, for the Atlanta Braves
- KBO: October 6, 2018, for the LG Twins

MLB statistics
- Batting average: .267
- Home runs: 29
- Runs batted in: 110

KBO statistics
- Batting average: .339
- Home runs: 8
- Runs batted in: 34
- Stats at Baseball Reference

Teams
- Atlanta Braves (2015–2017); LG Twins (2018)

Adonis García Arrieta (born April 12, 1985) is a Cuban former professional baseball third baseman. He played in the Cuban National Series from 2004 through 2011, and then defected from Cuba. He played in Major League Baseball (MLB) for the Atlanta Braves from 2015 to 2017 and also played in the KBO League for the LG Twins in 2018.

== Career ==
=== Cuban baseball ===
García debuted in the Cuban National Series in 2004 with Ciego de Ávila. In the Cuban National Series, García began as a shortstop, and then shifted to play other infield and outfield positions. During the 2008–09 season, he had a .355 batting average, .426 on-base percentage (OBP), and .613 slugging percentage (SLG) in 282 at-bats. That season, he recorded 21 home runs and 67 runs batted in. García played for the Cuba national baseball team in the 2009 World Port Tournament, leading all players in batting average at .500. In 2010–11, his final season in the Cuban National Series, García batted .334 with a .397 OBP and .623 SLG in 308 at-bats.

García then defected from Cuba via Nicaragua and Mexico in August 2010, making it to the United States in January 2011. He played the 2011–12 winter in the Venezuelan Winter League, where he hit .270 with a .313 OBP and .461 SLG in 152 at-bats during the regular season for the Navegantes del Magallanes. He then batted .376 with a .431 OBP and .548 SLG in 93 at-bats during the 2012 Caribbean Series with the Tigres de Aragua. García was named to the Caribbean Series All-Star Team as a center fielder.

=== New York Yankees ===
In August 2011, Major League Baseball (MLB) declared García ineligible to sign for six months due to fraudulent residency paperwork. He established residency in Venezuela and MLB declared him a free agent in February 2012. García signed with the Yankees on May 2, 2012, for $400,000.

In 2012, García debuted for the Tampa Yankees of the High-A Florida State League before being promoted to the Trenton Thunder of the Double-A Eastern League. In all for the season, he hit .263/.311/.424 with five home runs, 29 runs batted in (RBI), and two stolen bases in 57 games. He played all three outfield positions, with most of the time split between CF and RF. The next year, García played for the Scranton/Wilkes-Barre RailRiders of the Triple-A International League, with 6 games with the Rookie-level GCL Yankees as well. Between the teams, he finished the year with a .258 average, .308 OBP, .364 SLG, four home runs, 12 RBI, and four steals in 56 games. Through the season, he again split the time mostly between center fielder and right fielder with a handful of games in LF. García spent the whole of 2014 with the RailRiders. For the year, in 86 games, he hit .319 with a .353 OBP, .474 SLG, nine home runs, 45 RBI, and 11 steals. Like his previous seasons in the organization, García mostly played in the outfield, but spent 19 games at third base while also being the designated hitter in eight games.

The Yankees released García on April 1, 2015.

=== Atlanta Braves ===
He signed with the Atlanta Braves four days later, and was assigned to the Gwinnett Braves of the International League. On May 18, García was called up to the major leagues. He made his major league debut the next day, but was soon optioned back to Gwinnett. The Braves recalled García on July 25 after the Braves traded Juan Uribe and Kelly Johnson. García hit his first career home run on July 26 off of Michael Wacha of the St. Louis Cardinals. On August 3, he hit a walk-off, 2-run home run against the San Francisco Giants, a game which the Braves won 9–8. García finished the season with a .277 batting average and ten home runs, becoming the second player in Braves' franchise history to hit ten or more home runs in less than 200 at-bats.

García began the 2016 season as the Braves starting third baseman. In late April, the team began shifting him between left field and third base in order to keep his bat in the lineup while minimizing opportunities for García to make defensive miscues. The Braves optioned García to Gwinnett on May 6 to get him more playing time in left field. Three weeks later, he returned to the majors to play third base. García started at third for the rest of the season and hit .273 with 14 home runs.

García hit for a .237 batting average, a .626 on-base plus slugging percentage, and four home runs until he was placed on the 10-day disabled list on May 16, 2017. García was sent to the minor leagues for extended rehabilitation, and did not return until June 2. Four days later, García injured himself while batting and later underwent surgery on the ligament of his left ring finger. García returned to the major leagues in September, after rosters had expanded.

=== LG Twins ===
In January 2018, García was released from his contract with the Braves and signed with the LG Twins, a KBO League team to a one-year, $800,000 contract. He became a free agent following the season.

=== Diablos Rojos del México ===
On February 13, 2019, García signed with the Diablos Rojos del México of the Mexican League. In 13 appearances for the team, he batted .240/.328/.420 with two home runs, nine RBI, and one stolen base. García was released by the Diablos on May 8.

=== Toros de Tijuana ===
On July 2, 2019, García signed with the Toros de Tijuana of the Mexican League. In 24 appearances for Tijuana, García slashed .258/.327/.409 with four home runs, 12 RBI, and six stolen bases.

=== Generales de Durango ===
On July 29, 2019, García was traded to the Generales de Durango of the Mexican League. In 24 games for Durango, he hit .276/.351/.425 with two home runs, 12 RBI, and one stolen base.

García did not play in a game in 2020 due to the cancellation of the Mexican League season because of the COVID-19 pandemic. He later became a free agent.

== Personal life ==
García's brother, Adolis García, also defected from Cuba and plays baseball in the United States. The two faced each other in the 2016 Caribbean Series, in which Adonis played for Tigres de Aragua and José Adolis for Ciego de Ávila.

== Scouting report ==
García is listed at 5 feet 9 inches (1.75 m) and 190 pounds (86 kg). He is considered a skilled hitter.

== See also ==
- List of baseball players who defected from Cuba
