= 1977–78 Cuban National Series =

Baseball season in Cuba

1977–78 Cuban National Series Serie Nacional de Béisbol 1977–78
- League: Cuban National Series
- Sport: Baseball
- Games: 51
- Teams: 18

Regular season
- Champion: Vegueros (36–14)

SNB seasons
- ← 1976–77 1978–79 →

The 17th season of the Cuban National Series saw Vegueros of Pinar del Río Province win the title, finishing with a slim lead over Industriales of Havana. The makeup of the league was directly influenced by the administrative restructuring of the provinces of Cuba. The league expanded from 14 to 18 teams, and the regular season increased from 39 to 51 games (Note: A team facing each of the other 17 teams in the league 3 times each yields a schedule of 51 games.) (although some teams played as few as 46 games).

== Restructuring ==
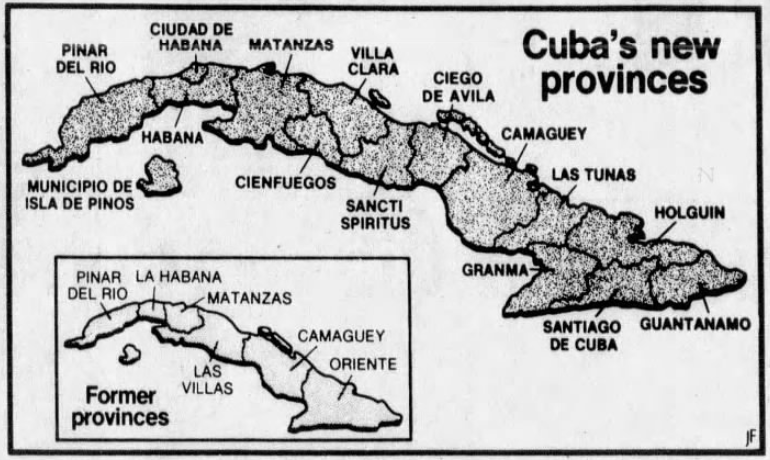
Cuba's provinces as of December 1976

Many teams were reconstituted to align with Cuba's restructuring into 14 provinces and one special municipality, announced in December 1976.

The league expanded to 18 teams: 11 provinces fielded a single team each, three provinces fielded two teams each, and the special administrative area of Isla de Pinos (later renamed Isla de la Juventud) fielded a team.

The three provinces fielding two teams each were:

- Ciudad de La Habana Province (the city of Havana): Industriales and Metropolitanos
- Pinar del Río Province: Vegueros and Forestales
- Matanzas Province: Citricultores and Henequeneros

The 1977–78 season was also the first in which aluminum bats were used league-wide replacing the wooden bats, and was also the first in which the designated hitter was used, replacing the pitcher's turn at bat, following an off-season decision by the Baseball Federation of Cuba and by the National Sports Institution, following the lead of the American League of Major League Baseball four years before.

== Standings ==
Team	W	L	Pct.	GB
Vegueros (Pinar del Río)	36	14	.720	-
Industriales (Havana)	35	16	.686	1½
Camagüey	30	21	.588	6½
Forestales (Pinar del Río)	29	21	.580	7
Metropolitanos (Havana)	28	21	.571	7½
Villa Clara	28	21	.571	7½
Cienfuegos	29	22	.568	7½
Guantánamo	28	22	.560	8
Ciego de Ávila	26	23	.530	9
Citricultores (Matanzas)	27	24	.529	9½
Granma	25	25	.500	11
Santiago de Cuba	25	25	.500	11
La Habana	21	26	.446	13½
Holguín	22	28	.440	14
Sancti Spíritus	20	30	.400	16
Henequeneros (Matanzas)	16	30	.347	18
Las Tunas	12	37	.244	23½
Isla de Pinos	10	41	.196	26½
