= Servio Borges =

Cuban baseball manager

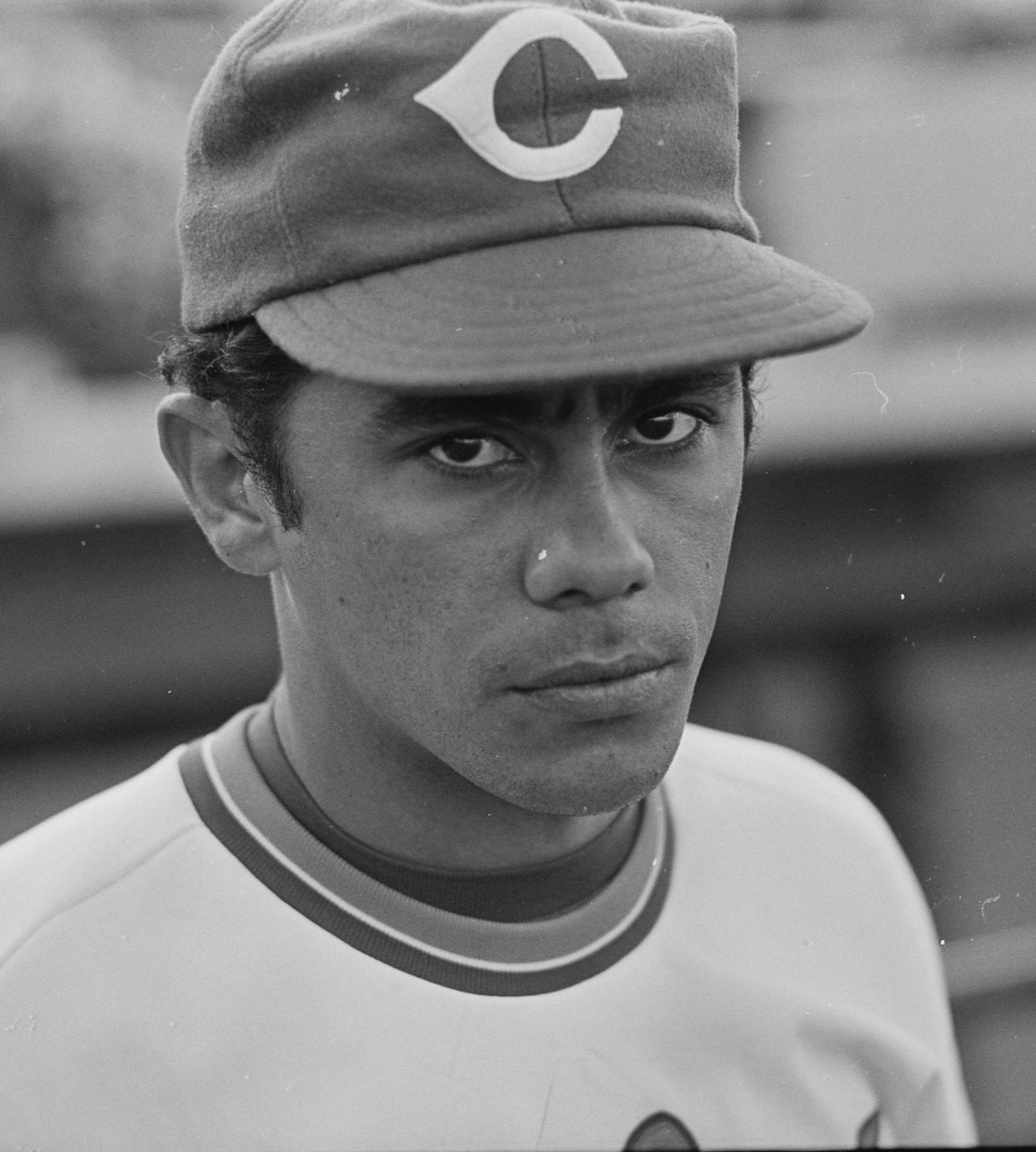
- Manager
- Born: 8 July 1947 (age 79); Guantánamo, Cuba

Career statistics
- Managerial record: 318-130
- Winning %: .710

Teams
- Azucareros (1968–1972)
Medals
Men's baseball
Manager for Cuba
Olympic Games
Silver medal – second place	2000 Sydney	Team
Pan American Games
Gold medal – first place	1971 Cali	Team
Gold medal – first place	1975 Mexico City	Team
Gold medal – first place	1979 San Juan	Team
Central American and Caribbean Games
Gold medal – first place	1970 Panama City	Team
Gold medal – first place	1974 Santo Domingo	Team
Gold medal – first place	1978 Medellin	Team
Baseball World Cup
Gold medal – first place	1969 Santo Domingo	Team
Gold medal – first place	1970 Cartagena	Team
Gold medal – first place	1971 Havana	Team
Gold medal – first place	1972 Managua	Team
Gold medal – first place	1973 Havana	Team
Gold medal – first place	1976 Cartagena	Team
Gold medal – first place	1978 Rome	Team
Gold medal – first place	1980 Tokyo	Team
Gold medal – first place	1990 Edmonton	Team

Servio Tulio Borges Suárez (born 8 July 1947) is a Cuban former baseball manager. Along with Jorge Fuentes, he is considered one of the best managers in modern Cuban baseball history.

Borges was the most prominent of a generation of university-trained physical education graduates to manage in Cuban baseball. He was named manager of Azucareros in the Cuban National Series at the age of 22, winning the 1968–69 championship in his first season at the helm, the first title for a team outside of Havana.

Borges took helmed the Cuba national baseball team for over a decade, one of the national team's most dominant runs, starting with the 1969 Amateur World Series. Over the course of his career, he led Cuba to nine world championships, as well as gold medal finishes at three Pan American Games, four Central American and Caribbean Games, and an Intercontinental Cup. At the 2000 Summer Olympic Games, Borges managed the team to a silver medal.

== Career ==
Borges played baseball in his youth, mainly as a center fielder, but did not pursue a career as a professional. He instead enrolled as an aviation cadet and later in the Escuela de Profesores de Educación Física (EPEF) Comandante Manuel Fajardo, where his thesis "Speed in Baseball" caught the attention of the Baseball Federation of Cuba. That thesis earned him his first managerial job, at the head of the Azucareros team. Implementing a philosophy of discipline, speed, and agressiveness on the basepaths, Azucareros won the championship in his debut season.

Borges was then selected to manage Cuba at the 1969 Amateur World Series in the Dominican Republic. Cuba defeated the United States, in its return to major international competition, in the championship game. Borges was sacked as manager of the national team after a pair of defeats in the final of the 1981 Intercontinental Cup in Edmonton and the 1982 Central American and Caribbean Games in Havana.

Borges managed relatively few seasons in the Cuban National Series, though he won two championships: with Azucareros of Villa Clara, in 1968–69 and 1971–72. He came out of retirement to manage Havana in the 1990 Serie Selectiva, and led the Cuban national team to the gold medal at the 1990 Baseball World Cup. His managerial record was 167 wins and 64 losses, a winning percentage of .723. In 2003, Borges managed the Olmecas de Tabasco of the Mexican League to an 8–14 record; he remained with the Olmecas front office through 2005.

Borges returned to manage Cuba at the 2000 Summer Olympic Games, held in Sydney, Australia. Cuba lost its 18–0 undefeated record at the Olympics with a group stage loss to the Netherlands, and went on to lose the gold medal game to the United States after a controversial decision to start reliever Pedro Luis Lazo as part of a bullpen game.
