= Luis Felipe Rivera =

Cuban baseball player (born 1977)

Piratas de Isla de la Juventud – No. 88
- Infielder
- Born: 10 August 1977 (age 48); Marianao, Havana, Cuba
- Bats: Left Throws: Left

Teams
- Isla de la Juventud (1996–present)

Luis Felipe Rivera Despaigne (born 10 August 1977) is a Cuban baseball infielder for the Piratas de Isla de la Juventud of the Cuban National Series. Rivera represented Cuba at the 2013 World Baseball Classic.

== Career ==
Rivera was born on 10 August 1977 in the Marianao municipality of Havana. He made his Cuban National Series debut on 17 November 1996 playing for Isla de la Juventud under manager Armando Johnson. That season, he appeared in 40 games, recording a .242/.270/.326 batting line.

In 2013, Rivera was selected to represent Cuba at the 2013 World Baseball Classic. He appeared in five games, recording four at bats, three runs scored, one hit, and a .250/.250/.250 batting line.

On 19 December 2020, Rivera recorded his 2,000th hit in a game against pitcher Adrián Bueno of the Elefantes de Cienfuegos, becoming the twenty-sixth player to reach the milestone in the Cuban National Series.

As of the 2025–26 season, Rivera ranks eighth in hits in Cuban National Series history and is the all-time hits leader for Isla de la Juventud, with 2,202.
