= Emmanuel Chapman =

Kansas City Monarchs
- Pitcher
- Born: September 23, 1998 (age 28); Báguanos, Cuba
- Bats: Right Throws: Right

Emmanuel Chapman (born September 23, 1998) is a Cuban professional baseball pitcher for the Kansas City Monarchs. He was named to the Cuba national baseball team for the 2026 World Baseball Classic

Chapman started his career pitching for the Sabuesos de Holguín of the Cuban National Series. In three years in Cuba, Chapman had a 9.82 ERA across 51 1/3 innings. In April 2023, Chapman left Cuba for the Dominican Republic in order to pursue a contract in Major League Baseball.

In December 2023, Chapman signed with the Pittsburgh Pirates of Major League Baseball as an international free agent for $200,000.
