= 2016–17 Alazanes de Granma season =

- Cuban Baseball
Team	Granma Alazanes
League	Cuban National Series
Season	2016-2017
Final Result	Champion

The 2016-2017 Granma season was the 40th for the team in the Cuban National Series and was the first season that they won the National Series.

Granma's manager was Carlos Marti Santos.

== Roster ==
=== Pitchers ===
Number	Name	Bats	Throws	Age	Height (m)	Weight (kg)	Place of birth	Notes
51	Yoalkis Cruz Rondon	R	R	37	1.90	91	Las Tunas	
42	Migue Lahera Betancou	R	R	32	1.92	120	Artemisa	
84	Leorisbel Sanchez Hndez	L	R	32	1.72	68	Cienfuegos	
79	Lázaro Blanco Matos	R	R	30	1.93	91	Granma	(Note: Named to 2017 World Baseball Classic Pre-Team Roster for Cuba.)
49	Jose Armando PeÑa Rodriguez	R	R	30	1.92	80	Granma	
37	Juan Ramon Olivera Verdeci	R	R	28	1.80	96	Granma	
56	Erluis Blanco Reyes	R	R	27	1.72	86	Granma	
35	Maidel NéÑez Morales	R	R	23	1.84	83	Granma	
9	César García Rondón	R	R	25	1.76	70	Granma	(Note: Named to 2017 World Baseball Classic Pre-Team Roster for Cuba.)
99	Edgar Escobar Noris	R	R	20	1.90	91	Granma	
19	Adriel Moreno Rondón	L	L	26	1.77	86	Granma	
48	Jorge Torres Aguilar	L	L	22	1.82	74	Granma	
94	Andri Aguila Castro	R	R	23	1.69	60	Granma	
71	Leandro Martinez Figueredo	R	R	36	1.76	90	Granma	(Note: Named to 2017 World Baseball Classic Pre-Team Roster for Cuba.)
19	Yanier Gonzalez Rodriguez	R	R	36	1.80	100	Granma	
	Yosvany Garcia Correa	R	R	27	1.80	85	Granma	
	Carlos Santana Satiest	R	R	27	1.80	85	Granma	

=== Catchers ===
Number	Name	Bats	Throws	Age	Height (m)	Weight (kg)	Place of birth
45	Frank C. Morejon Reyes	R	R	30	1.76	90	La Habana
20	Edilberto Mendoza Pino	R	R	30	1.77	91	Granma

=== Infielders ===
Number	Name	Bats	Throws	Age	Height (m)	Weight (kg)	Place of birth	Notes
21	Guillermo Avilés Difurnot	L	R	24	1.83	87	Granma	(Note: Named to 2017 World Baseball Classic Pre-Team Roster for Cuba.)
5	Carlos Benítez Pérez	R	R	30	1.74	91	Granma	
24	Lázaro Cedeño González	R	R	30	1.82	96	Granma	
52	Osvaldo Abreu Sánchez	R	R	27	1.72	70	Granma	
46	Marcos Luis Fonseca Alcea	R	R	30	1.81	76	Granma	
66	Yulián Rafael Milán Santos	R	R	32	1.71	73	Granma	
6	Héctor Árias Batista	R	R	23	1.69	83	Granma	
2	Wilfredo Sanchez Rosales	R	R	31	1.74	80	Granma	

=== Outfielders ===
Number	Name	Bats	Throws	Age	Height (m)	Weight (kg)	Place of birth	Notes
27	Dennis Laza Spencer	R	R	32	1.77	84	Mayabeque	(Note: Played as a member of the Cuban National Team in an exhibition game against the MLB Tampa Bay Rays with Presidents Obama and Castro in attendance, March 2017)
1	Roel Santos Martínez	L	R	29	1.72	78	Granma	
22	Alesquemer Sanchez Sanchez	R	R	22	1.78	70	Granma	
18	Raico Santos Almeida	L	L	23	1.74	87	Granma	
54	Alfredo Despaigne Rodriguez	R	R	30	1.75	104	Santiago de Cuba	(Note: Named to 2017 World Baseball Classic Pre-Team Roster for Cuba.)
51	Yoelkis Cespedes Maceo	R	R	19	1.85	90	Granma	(Note: Named to 2017 World Baseball Classic Pre-Team Roster for Cuba.)
	Leosdani Batista Granda	R	R	27	1.80	85	Granma	
	Juan M. Benitez Tamayo	R	R	27	1.80	85	Granma	
	Darien Garcia Figuered	R	R	27	1.80	85	Granma	

== Regular season ==
Wins	Losses	Pct.	League Rank	GB from 1st	Home	Road	L10	Streak
52	43	.547	4	21	30 - 21	22 - 22	W4 - L6	0

=== Postseason ===
Team manager Carlos Marti Santos dedicated the win to the memory of Fidel Castro and to the Granma fans. Alfredo Despaigne Rodriguez (Olympic medalist and player in Japanese and Mexican league baseball) said that the Series win was the greatest moment of his life in baseball.
