= Leandro Martínez (baseball) =

Cuban baseball player

- Martínez in 2023

Alazanes de Granma
- Pitcher
- Born: June 28, 1978 (age 48); Campechuela, Granma Province, Cuba
- Bats: Left Throws: Left
- Stats at Baseball Reference

Leandro Martínez Figueredo (born June 28, 1978) is a Cuban former baseball pitcher for Alazanes de Granma in the Cuban National Series.

Martínez played for the Cuba national baseball team at the 2012 Haarlem Baseball Week and 2017 World Baseball Classic.
