= Vegueros de Pinar del Río =

Cuban professional baseball team

- Logo

Information
- League: Cuban National Series
- Location: Pinar del Río, Pinar del Río Province
- Ballpark: Estadio Capitán San Luis
- Established: 1969; 57 years ago
- Nickname(s): Vegueros (Meadow Growers); Pativerdes (Greenlegs); Tsunami verde (Green Tsunami)
- Caribbean Series championships: 1 (2015)
- National Series championships: 10 (1977–78, 1980–81, 1981–82, 1984–85, 1986–87, 1987–88, 1996–97, 1997–98, 2010–11, 2013–14)
- Former name: Forestales
- Colors: Green, yellow and white
- Manager: Alexander Urquiola

Current uniforms
| Home | Away |

Pinar del Río is a baseball team in the Cuban National Series, representing the western province of the same name. Nicknamed the Vegueros (English: Tobacco Growers), the team plays its home games at the Estadio Capitán San Luis, in the city of Pinar del Río.

Founded in 1969 as the Vegueros, the team is historically one of the more successful teams in the Cuban National Series, winning ten championships, most recently in 2014. It also won the 2015 Caribbean Series, becoming the first Cuban team to win a Caribbean Series since Cienfuegos in 1960, and the only one to do so in the National Series (post-1961) era.

== History ==
Vegueros were founded in 1969, and were one of the most successful teams in the early years of the National Series, considered along with Industriales, Santiago de Cuba and Villa Clara. They won their first title in 1978 and would do so five more times in the next decade, including back-to-back wins in 1981 and 1982 and playoff wins in 1987 and 1988. In 1986, the first year that the Cuban champion was determined by playoffs, Vegueros sensationally lost in extra innings against Industriales.

Prior to the 1992-93 Cuban National Series, two teams competed in the province of Pinar del Río: Forestales (also known as Pinar del Río during some seasons) and Vegueros. A 1992–1993 contraction of the league, in which eight teams were eliminated, caused Vegueros and Forestales to be combined into a single team.

In 2015, Pinar del Río won the Caribbean Series, becoming the first Cuban winner since 1960.

== Roster ==
Vegueros de Pinar del Río roster – 2020–21 Cuban National Series
| Players | | Coaches |
| Pitchers: 15 Dariel Fernández; 20 Yoandy Cruz; 22 Frank Álvarez; 23 Jorge Montano; 26 Noel Reina; 27 Branlis Rodríguez; 52 Erlis Casanova; 56 Yosvany Torres; 57 Reilandy González; 59 Vladimir Baños; 77 Yaifredo Domínguez; 82 Leodán Reyes; 89 Liván Moinelo; 90 Isbel Hernández; 91 Frank Medina; 92 Raidel Martínez; 94 Andrés Castro | Catchers: 3 Irandi Hernández; 43 Olber Peña; 51 Jorge Rojas; 66 Yanciel Ajete; Infielders: 2 Juan Carlos Arencibia; 4 Pedro Dueñas; 7 Jeifer Rodríguez; 18 Tony Guerra; 23 Pedro Rodríguez; 28 William Saavedra; 53 Frank González; 72 Esteban Terry; 75 Luis Enrique García; Outfielders: 1 Roidel Martínez; 11 Reinier León; 17 Lázaro Blanco; 24 Luis Pablo Acosta; 32 Reinaldo Lazaga; 44 Yaser González | Manager: 58 Alexander Urquiola; Coaches: 6 Mario Valle; 34 Jorge Gallardo; 71 Joselian Ceja; 61 Raciel Sánchez; 19 Jesús Bosmenier; 39 José Antonio Soto |

== Past stars ==
- Pitchers: Omar Ajete, Jesús Bosmenier, Faustino Corrales, Reinaldo Costa, Rogelio García, Jesús Guerra, Pedro Luis Lazo, Juan Carlos Oliva, Félix Pino, Julio Romero, Emilio Salgado
- Infielders: Giraldo González, Félix Iglesias, Carmelo Pedroso, Alexei Ramirez, Alfonso Urquiola, Omar Linares
- Catchers: Juan Castro
- Outfielders: Luis Giraldo Casanova, Jose Enrrique Camejo, Lázaro Madera

== Emigrants ==
Several Pinar del Río players have left Cuba for the North American Major Leagues.

- José Contreras (pitcher)
- Alay Soler (pitcher)
- Juan Miranda (infielder)
- Danys Báez (pitcher)
- Alexei Ramírez (outfielder)
- Yosvany Madera (catcher)
