= Carlos Martí =

Cuban baseball manager

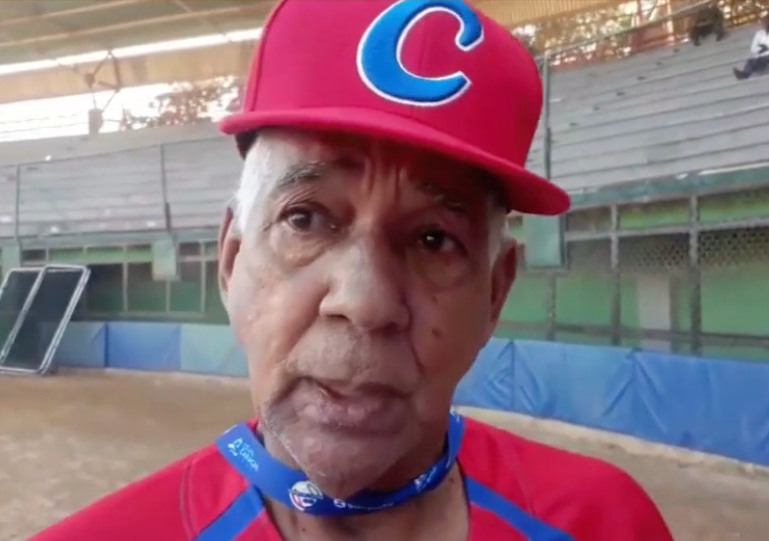
- Martí in 2023
- Manager
- Born: 16 February 1949 (age 77); Buey Arriba, Granma Province, Cuba

Carlos Manuel Martí Santos (born 16 February 1949) is a Cuban baseball manager. He managed the Alazanes de Granma in the Cuban National Series and the Cuba national baseball team in the 2017 World Baseball Classic.

Martí was born on 16 February 1949 in San Pablo de Yao, a town in the municipality of Buey Arriba, Granma Province. He last managed the Alazanes de Granma.
