= José García (pitcher, born 1981) =

Cuban baseball player

Cazadores de Artemisa
- Pitcher
- Born: February 23, 1981 (age 45); Artemisa, Cuba
- Bats: Right Throws: Right
- Stats at Baseball Reference

José Angel García Sánchez (born February 23, 1981) is a Cuban professional baseball pitcher for Cazadores de Artemisa in the Cuban National Series.

García played for the Cuba national baseball team at the 2017 World Baseball Classic.
