= Yosvani Pérez =

Cuban baseball player (born 1974)

Medal record

Men's baseball

Representing Cuba

World Baseball Classic
Silver medal – second place	2006 San Diego	Team

Intercontinental Cup
Silver medal – second place	1999 Barcelona	Team
Silver medal – second place	2002 Sydney	Team

Yosvani Pérez Ruiz (born January 23, 1974, in Rodas, Cienfuegos Province, Cuba) is a left-handed pitcher for Cienfuegos of the Cuban National Series, and the Cuban national baseball team. Pérez was part of the Cuban roster at the 2006 World Baseball Classic.

With an 8-5 record and a 2.30 ERA during the 2005-06 season, Pérez was one of the few bright spots for a Cienfuegos team that went 35-54.
