= Alfredo Rodríguez (baseball) =

- Shortstop
- Born: June 17, 1994 (age 30); Havana, Cuba
- Bats: Right Throws: Right

Alfredo Rodríguez (born June 17, 1994) is a Cuban former professional baseball shortstop. He signed with the Cincinnati Reds organization as an international free agent in 2016.

== Career ==
Rodríguez began his professional career in the Cuban National Series for Isla de la Juventud. He was the 2014-15 Rookie of the Year, and won the National Series gold glove award equivalent.

=== Cincinnati Reds ===
Rodríguez defected from Cuba, and signed with the Cincinnati Reds as an international free agent on July 4, 2016. He received a $7 million signing bonus.

Rodríguez played for the DSL Reds in 2016, hitting .234/.314/.299/.613 with 0 home runs, 8 RBI, and 9 stolen bases. He spent the 2017 season with the Daytona Tortugas, hitting .253/.294/.294/.588 with 2 home runs and 36 RBI. He split the 2018 season between the Arizona League Reds, Daytona, and the Pensacola Blue Wahoos, hitting a combined .210/.273/.312/.585 with 2 home runs and 15 RBI. He played for the Scottsdale Scorpions of the Arizona Fall League following the 2018 season. Rodríguez split the 2019 season between the Chattanooga Lookouts and Louisville Bats, hitting a combined .267/.314/.327/.641 with 1 home run and 34 RBI. He did not play a minor league game in 2020 due to the cancellation of the minor league season caused by the COVID-19 pandemic. In 2021, Rodríguez returned to Triple-A Louisville and hit .283/.333/.354 with 3 home runs and 48 RBI in 117 games. On March 12, 2022, Rodríguez was released by the Reds organization.

=== Washington Nationals ===
On April 25, 2022, Rodríguez signed a minor league contract with the Washington Nationals organization and was assigned to the Triple-A Rochester Red Wings. He was released on July 21, 2022.
