= Roger Machado (baseball) =

Cuban baseball player (born 1974)

Medal record

Men's baseball

Representing Cuba

World Baseball Classic
Silver medal – second place	2006 San Diego	Team

Olympic Games
Gold medal – first place	2004 Athens	Team

Baseball World Cup
Gold medal – first place	2003 Havana	Team
Gold medal – first place	2005 Rotterdam	Team

Intercontinental Cup
Gold medal – first place	2002 Havana	Team

Pan American Games
Gold medal – first place	2003 Santo Domingo	Team

Roger Machado Morales (born March 31, 1974, in Morón, Ciego de Ávila Province, Cuba) is a defensive-minded catcher with Ciego de Ávila of the Cuban National Series. He is the National Series' all-time leader in throwing out baserunners.

Machado was part of the Cuba national baseball team that brought home the gold medal from the 2004 Summer Olympics and that won the silver medal at the 2006 World Baseball Classic.
