= 2001–02 Cuban National Series =

The 41st Cuban National Series saw a surprise champion, as Holguín engineered a strong season to edge Santiago de Cuba and win Group C. The Sabuesos then upended Camagüey, Villa Clara and finally Sancti Spíritus—in a 2-1 seventh game—to take their first title.

== Regular season standings ==
=== Western zone ===
Group A
Team	W	L	PCT.	GB
Pinar del Río	64	26	.711	-
Isla de Juventud	51	39	.567	13
Matanzas	48	42	.533	16
Metropolitanos	31	59	.344	33

Group B
Team	W	L	PCT.	GB
Sancti Spíritus	53	37	.589	-
Industriales	49	41	.544	4
La Habana	45	45	.500	8
Cienfuegos	33	57	.367	20

=== Eastern zone ===
Group C
Team	W	L	PCT.	GB
Villa Clara	54	36	.600	-
Camagüey	44	46	.489	10
Ciego de Avila	42	48	.467	12
Las Tunas	23	67	.256	31

Group D
Team	W	L	PCT.	GB
Holguín	55	35	.611	-
Santiago de Cuba	54	36	.600	1
Granma	38	52	.422	17
Guantánamo	36	54	.400	19

== Playoffs ==
Quarterfinals
A1	Pinar del Río	3
B2	Industriales	1
West
B1	Sancti Spíritus	3
A2	Isla de la Juventud	2
C1	Villa Clara	3
D2	Santiago de Cuba	1
East
D1	Holguín	3
C2	Camagüey	1

Semifinals
A1	Pinar del Río	2
B1	Sancti Spíritus	4
C1	Villa Clara	2
D1	Holguín	4

Finals
B1	Sancti Spíritus	3
D1	Holguín	4
