= Estadio Cristóbal Labra =

Baseball stadium in Nueva Gerona, Cuba

Coordinates: 21°52′56″N 82°48′35″W

- El paraíso de los jonrones (home run paradise)
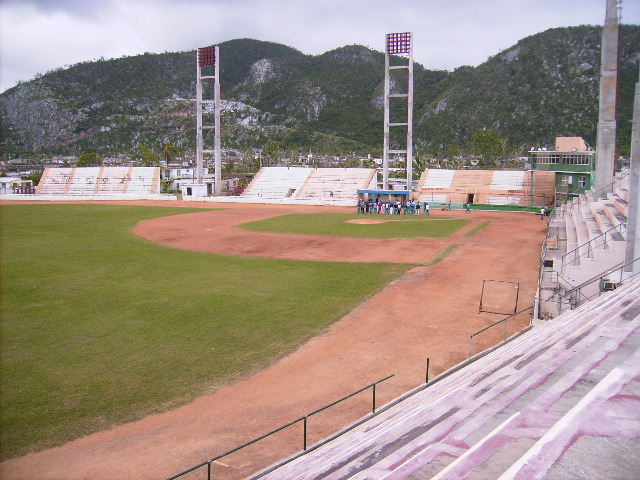
- CristobalLabra
- Interactive map of Estadio Cristóbal Labra
- Former names: Estadio Municipal (ca. 1957-1973)
- Location: Nueva Gerona, Isla de la Juventud, Cuba
- Capacity: 5,000
- Surface: Grass
- Field size: (before increase in 2003); Left field: 320 ft Center field: 390 ft Right field: 310 ft

Construction
- Opened: 1957
- Renovated: 1973, 2003

Tenant
- Isla de la Juventud Toronjeros

Estadio Cristóbal Labra opened in 1957 as Municipal Stadium, in Nueva Gerona on the Isla de la Juventud. With 5,000 seats, it is the smallest in the Cuban National Series and was the only stadium without lights.
