= 1974–75 Cuban National Series =

Baseball season in Cuba

1974–75 Cuban National Series Serie Nacional de Béisbol 1974–75
- League: Cuban National Series
- Sport: Baseball
- Number of games: 39
- Number of teams: 14

Regular season
- Champion: Agricultores (24–15)

SNB seasons
- ← 1973–74 1975–76 →

The 14th Cuban National Series was won by Agricultores, a team from Havana, who finished just one game ahead of two other teams. The short season of 39 games coincided with the first Selective Series, a sort of domestic all-star league for Cuban baseball players. While the size of the league (14 teams) remained the same as during the prior season, half of the teams in the league changed.

== Standings ==
Team	W	L	Pct.	GB
Agricultores	24	15	.615	-
Vegueros	23	16	.589	1
Constructores	23	16	.589	1
Granjeros	22	17	.564	2
Citricultores	22	17	.564	2
Metropolitanos	21	17	.552	2½
Cafetaleros	21	18	.538	3
Ganaderos	20	18	.526	3½
Serranos	18	21	.461	6
Mineros	18	21	.461	6
Azucareros	17	22	.435	7
Forestales	17	22	.435	7
Henequeneros	13	26	.333	11
Arroceros	13	26	.333	11
