= 1973–74 Cuban National Series =

Baseball season in Cuba

1973–74 Cuban National Series Serie Nacional de Béisbol 1973–74
- League: Cuban National Series
- Sport: Baseball
- Number of games: 78
- Number of teams: 14

Regular season
- Champion: Habana (52–26)

SNB seasons
- ← 1972–73 1974–75 →

In the 13th season of the Cuban National Series, Habana won its second league title, finishing with a comfortable five-game cushion over Constructores.

== Standings ==
Team	W	L	Pct.	GB
Habana	52	26	.666	-
Constructores	47	31	.602	5
Azucareros	46	32	.589	6
Granjeros	44	34	.564	8
Serranos	42	35	.545	9½
Camagüey	41	35	.539	10½
Industriales	39	39	.500	13
Oriente	39	39	.500	13
Vegueros	39	39	.500	13
Pinar del Río	39	39	.500	13
Las Villas	32	46	.410	20
Matanzas	28	49	.363	23½
Henequeneros	28	50	.358	24
Mineros	28	50	.358	24
