= 2012–13 Cuban National Series =

2012–13 Cuban National Series Serie Nacional de Béisbol 2012–13
- League: Cuban National Series
- Sport: Baseball
- Duration: 25 November – 31 January; 26 March – 22 May
- Games: 87
- Teams: 16

Regular season
- Best record: Cienfuegos (56–31)

Postseason
- Finals champions: Villa Clara (8th title)
- Runners-up: Matanzas

SNB seasons
- ← 2011–12 2013–14 →

The 2012–13 Cuban National Series was the 52nd season of the league. Villa Clara defeated Matanzas in the series' final round.

The season involved a pause of approximately eight weeks, to allow players of the Cuba national baseball team to participate in the 2013 World Baseball Classic. Cuba won their pool to advance to the second round, where they were eliminated via two losses to Netherlands.
