= 1969–70 Cuban National Series =

Baseball season in Cuba

1969–70 Cuban National Series Serie Nacional de Béisbol 1969–70
- League: Cuban National Series
- Sport: Baseball
- Number of games: 66
- Number of teams: 12

Regular season
- Champion: Henequeneros (50–16)

SNB seasons
- ← 1968–69 1970–71 →

The ninth Cuban National Series was won by Henequeneros of Matanzas, edging Mineros by 1 1/2 games. The season was shortened from 99 to 66 games. Industriales had its worst finish to date, ending up fourth of 12 teams.

== Standings ==
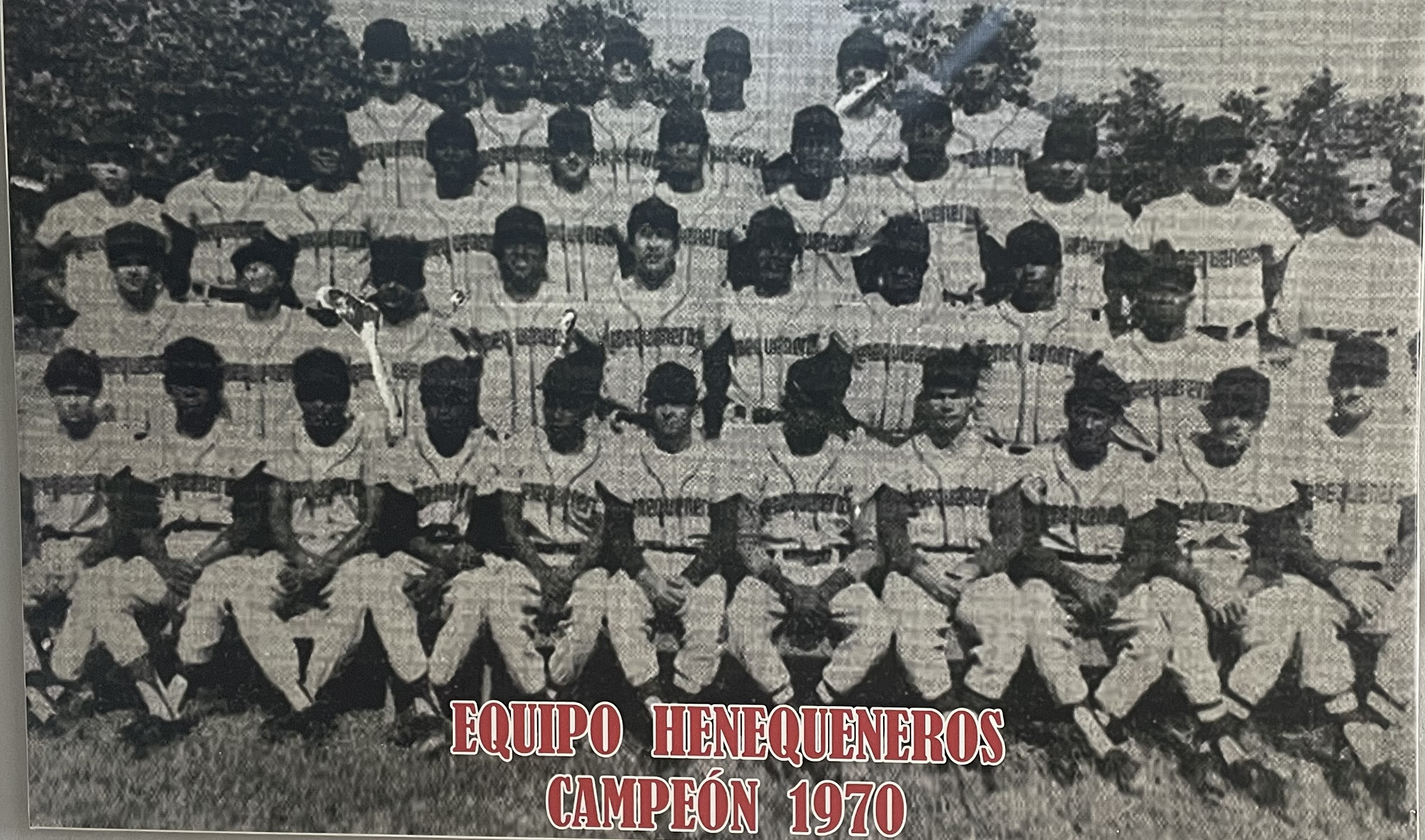
The Henequeneros of Matanzas in 1970, the champion

Team	W	L	Pct.	GB
Henequeneros	50	16	.757	-
Mineros	48	17	.738	1½
Azucareros	46	20	.690	4
Industriales	43	22	.661	6½
Habana	35	31	.530	15
Granjeros	33	32	.507	16½
Pinar del Río	29	36	.446	20½
Matanzas	26	36	.419	22
Las Villas	27	38	.415	22½
Camagüey	19	47	.287	31
Oriente	18	47	.276	31½
Vegueros	16	48	.250	33
