= 1975–76 Cuban National Series =

Baseball season in Cuba

1975–76 Cuban National Series Serie Nacional de Béisbol 1975–76
- League: Cuban National Series
- Sport: Baseball
- Number of games: 39
- Number of teams: 14

Regular season
- Champion: Ganaderos (29–9)

SNB seasons
- ← 1974–75 1976–77 →

The 15th Cuban National Series was won by Ganaderos, representing the province of Camagüey. They finished the season with all other teams more than five games behind. The length of schedule and the teams within the league remained the same as the prior season.

== Standings ==
| Team | W | L | Pct. | GB |
|---|---|---|---|---|
| Ganaderos | 29 | 9 | .763 | - |
| Metropolitanos | 24 | 15 | .615 | 5½ |
| Vegueros | 23 | 16 | .589 | 6½ |
| Constructores | 22 | 16 | .578 | 7 |
| Azucareros | 22 | 17 | .564 | 7½ |
| Agricultores | 20 | 17 | .540 | 8½ |
| Forestales | 18 | 20 | .473 | 11 |
| Granjeros | 17 | 20 | .459 | 11½ |
| Cafetaleros | 17 | 20 | .459 | 11½ |
| Serranos | 17 | 21 | .447 | 12 |
| Henequeneros | 16 | 22 | .421 | 13 |
| Citricultores | 16 | 23 | .410 | 13½ |
| Arroceros | 15 | 24 | .384 | 14½ |
| Mineros | 11 | 27 | .289 | 18 |
