= 2014–15 Cuban National Series =

2014–15 Cuban National Series Serie Nacional de Béisbol 2014–15
- League: Cuban National Series
- Sport: Baseball
- Duration: 21 September – 24 December; 4 January – 19 March
- Number of games: 87
- Number of teams: 16

Regular season
- Best record: Matanzas (55–32)

Postseason
- Finals champions: Ciego de Ávila (2nd title)
- Runners-up: Isla de la Juventud

SNB seasons
- ← 2013–14 2015–16 →

The 2014–15 Cuban National Series was the 54th season of the league. Ciego de Ávila defeated Isla de la Juventud in the series' final round. This was the first finals appearance for Isla de la Juventud, and the third for Ciego de Ávila.
