= 2013–14 Cuban National Series =

2013–14 Cuban National Series Serie Nacional de Béisbol 2013–14
- League: Cuban National Series
- Sport: Baseball
- Duration: 3 November – 7 January; 14 January – 25 March
- Number of games: 87
- Number of teams: 16

Regular season
- Best record: Matanzas (57–30)

Postseason
- Finals champions: Pinar del Río (4th title)
- Runners-up: Matanzas

SNB seasons
- ← 2012–13 2014–15 →

The 2013–14 Cuban National Series was the 53rd season of the league. Pinar del Río defeated Matanzas in the series' final round.
