= 1970–71 Cuban National Series =

Baseball season in Cuba

1970–71 Cuban National Series Serie Nacional de Béisbol 1970–71
- League: Cuban National Series
- Sport: Baseball
- Number of games: 66
- Number of teams: 12

Regular season
- Champion: Azucareros (49–16)

SNB seasons
- ← 1969–70 1971–72 →

The 10th season of the Cuban National Series ended with Azucareros taking the title, finishing just ahead of a group including Habana, Granjeros and Industriales.

== Standings ==
Team	W	L	Pct	GB
Azucareros	49	16	.753	-
Habana	48	18	.727	1½
Granjeros	47	19	.712	2½
Industriales	47	19	.712	2½
Mineros	40	26	.606	9½
Henequeneros	40	26	.606	9½
Vegueros	29	36	.446	20
Oriente	23	42	.353	26
Las Villas	22	43	.338	27
Camagüey	20	46	.300	29½
Matanzas	18	48	.272	31½
Pinar del Río	11	55	.166	38½
