= Cuban National Series =

Cuban baseball league

- Most recent season or competition: 2025–26 Cuban National Series
- Sport: Baseball
- Founded: 1961 (65 years ago)
- Organizing body: INDER
- No. of teams: 16 (since 2012–13)
- Country: Cuba
- Most recent champion: Matanzas (2025–26)
- Most titles: Industriales (12)
- Broadcasters: Tele Rebelde (Cuba); Cubamax TV (USA, since 2019–20 season)
- Streaming partners: YouTube (worldwide via Game Time platform of the WBSC YouTube channel, since 2020–21)
- Level on pyramid: 2 (since 2022) (Note: The National Series was the top level of Cuban baseball from 1961 to 2021, before being supplanted by the Cuban Elite League)
- Promotion to: Cuban Elite League
- Website: www.beisbolcubano.cu

The Cuban National Series (Spanish: Serie Nacional de Béisbol, or SNB) is a domestic baseball competition in Cuba. Formed after the dissolution of the Cuban League in the wake of the Cuban Revolution, the National Series is a part of the Cuban baseball league system.

For most of its existence, the National Series has existed as the top-level winter league in Cuba. From 2022 to 2024, it operated as a summer league, with the top six National Series teams qualifying for the Cuban Elite League (LEB). Starting with the 2025–26 season, SNB will return to a winter league schedule, while still qualifying teams to the LEB.

== History ==
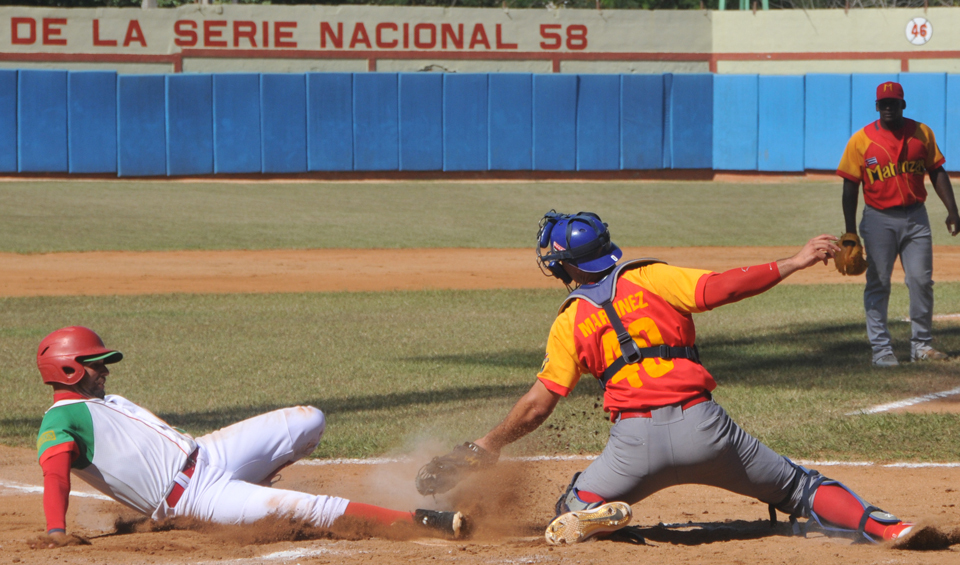
A 2020 game between Leñadores de Las Tunas and Cocodrilos de Matanzas

The Cuban National Series was instituted in replacement of the Cuban League, which had operated since 1878, as in March 1961 the Cuban government abolished professional baseball. The Cuban League typically consisted of four teams; the Cuban National Series has played with more than four teams since its 1965–66 season, peaking at 18 teams from the late 1970s into the early 1990s.

The Cuban National Series operated as a winter league for most of its history, generally playing a regular season stretching from early August until late January. As of 2023, the regular season spans late March to early July. An all-star game is held yearly at midseason. In Havana, most of the top tier players take the field for Industriales, traditionally the strongest team in the league. Other typically strong teams include those from Santiago de Cuba Province, Pinar del Río Province and Villa Clara Province.

In March 1982, the league was marred by a gambling-related corruption scandal, which saw at least 17 players and coaches suspended and arrested.

As of early 2019, baseball players in Cuba received $40 per month.

The COVID-19 pandemic resulted in no 2021–22 season being played.

The league serves as the first stage in the selection of players for the Cuba national baseball team for participation in international competitions and for both the World Baseball Classic and baseball at the Summer Olympics, when contested. Traditionally, the national team, known as Preseleccion, is selected from the Cuban National Series and practices in Havana. Sometimes more than one team can be asked to supply players for international duty as part of the national team, from Cuban National Series teams and recently from the Cuban Elite League.

From 2016 to 2019, the league champion advanced directly to the Caribbean Series as the Cuban delegate. Representation in the Caribbean Series was transferred to the Cuban Elite League, which plays a winter schedule, following its 2022–23 premiere season, but when the CNS returned to a winter schedule, the champion team - beginning 2024-25 - advances to the Serie de las Americas as the Cuban representative.

== League structure ==
=== 1961–1977 ===
From 1961–62, the inaugural season, through 1976–77, league size increased from just four charter teams to 14 teams, while the length of schedule grew from 27 to 99 games, but then reduced to 39 per team. Champions were decided based on end-of-season standings with no postseason, comparable to the National League and American League of Major League Baseball before 1969. In the event of a tie at the end of the season, a best-of-three tiebreaker series was played.

| Season | League size | Games | Notes |
|---|---|---|---|
| 1961–62 | 4 | 27 | Charter teams: Azucareros, Habana, Occidentales, Oriente |
| 1962–63 | 4 | 30 | Habana replaced by Industriales |
| 1963–64 | 4 | 36 | Oriente renamed as Orientales |
| 1964–65 | 4 | 39 | Azucareros replaced by Granjeros |
| 1965–66 | 6 | 65 | New teams: Centrales, Henequeneros |
| 1966–67 | 6 | 65 | Henequeneros replaced by Las Villas |
| 1967–68 | 12 | 99 | Orientales renamed as Oriente; Left league: Occidentales, Centrales; New teams: Azucareros, Camagüey, Habana, Henequeneros, Matanzas, Mineros, Vegueros, Pinar del Río |
| 1968–69 | 12 | 99 | |
| 1969–70 | 12 | 66 | |
| 1970–71 | 12 | 66 | |
| 1971–72 | 12 | 66 | |
| 1972–73 | 14 | 78 | New teams: Constructores, Serranos |
| 1973–74 | 14 | 78 | |
| 1974–75 | 14 | 39 | Left league: Camagüey, Habana, Industriales, Las Villas, Matanzas, Oriente, Pinar del Río; New teams: Agricultores, Arroceros, Cafetaleros, Citricultores, Forestales, Ganaderos, Metropolitanos |
| 1975–76 | 14 | 39 | |
| 1976–77 | 14 | 39 | |

=== 1977–1992 ===
The 1977–78 season followed the nation's administrative restructuring of the provinces of Cuba, announced in December 1976, resulting in changes to multiple teams within the league. Through the 1991–92 season, the league had 18 teams, as 11 provinces fielded a single team each, three provinces fielded two teams each, and the special administrative area of Isla de la Juventud (originally named Isla de Pinos) fielded a team. Also, aluminum bats similar to those used in American college baseball debuted, and use of the designated hitter was initiated.

In 1983–84, the league divided into divisions for the first time, with the league split into an upper-half "first division" and lower-half "second division" at the mid-point of the regular season. Division champions were based on end-of-season standings with no postseason. This format was only used for two seasons. In 1985–86, the league created Eastern and Western divisions, each with nine teams, and had the top two teams of each division advance to postseason play. The postseason first consisted of a round-robin tournament, with each team playing the other three teams twice each—this was used through the 1988–89 season. In 1989–90 (only), the two division winners faced off in a best-of-seven series to determine a league champion, while the two division runners-up met in a best-of-five series to determine third place. In 1990–91, the postseason format was changed to a bracket tournament, with two semifinal series (each best-of-three) followed by a final series (best-of-seven). In 1991–92, the semifinals were changed to best-of-five to match the MLB's Divisional Series format.

| Season | League size | Games | Notes |
|---|---|---|---|
| 1977–78 | 18 | 51 | No postseason |
| 1978–79 | 18 | 51 | No postseason |
| 1979–80 | 18 | 51 | No postseason |
| 1980–81 | 18 | 51 | No postseason |
| 1981–82 | 18 | 51 | No postseason |
| 1982–83 | 18 | 51 | No postseason |
| 1983–84 | 18 | 75 | Split into two divisions at midseason; no postseason |
| 1984–85 | 18 | 75 | Split into two divisions at midseason; no postseason |
| 1985–86 | 18 | 48 | Two divisions; four-team round-robin postseason |
| 1986–87 | 18 | 48 | Two divisions; four-team round-robin postseason |
| 1987–88 | 18 | 48 | Two divisions; four-team round-robin postseason |
| 1988–89 | 18 | 48 | Two divisions; four-team round-robin postseason |
| 1989–90 | 18 | 48 | Two divisions; division winners meet in title series |
| 1990–91 | 18 | 48 | Two divisions; four-team bracket tournament |
| 1991–92 | 18 | 48 | Two divisions; four-team bracket tournament |

=== 1992–2021 ===
In 1992–93, league size reduced from 18 to 16 teams, as Pinar del Río Province and Matanzas Province, each of which had been fielding two teams each, began fielding a single team each. The 16 teams were divided into four groups (divisions) with the top team from each group advancing to postseason play. The postseason consisted of best-of-seven semifinal series followed by a best-of-seven final series.

Between 1993 and 1997, the league adopted an unbalanced schedule of 65 games, with each team playing 7 games against each opponent in its division (21 games), 5 games against each opponent in the other division of its zone (20 games), and 3 games against each opponent in the other zone (24 games). Between 1997 and 2012, a balanced schedule was used, with each team playing 6 games against each of the other opponents regardless of group or zone (90 games, 96 in 2012).

In the 1997-98 season, the postseason was expanded to eight teams, with the division champions plus the two teams with the best winning percentage in each division qualifying. A quarterfinal stage, played in a best-of-five series, was added. For the playoffs, the division winners were seeded first and second and received home-court advantage.

In 2008–2009, the league was reorganized into two eight-team divisions, East and West, with the top four teams from each division qualifying for the postseason, and all playoff series contested as best-of-seven.

In 2011–2012, there were 17 competing teams, as the then-La Habana Province was split into Artemisa Province and Mayabeque Province. Thus, the West division had nine teams, including the two new clubs. The league returned to 16 teams beginning with the 2012–13 season when the Metropolitanos (long seen as a farm club of the powerhouse Industriales) were disbanded after nearly four decades of play.

In 2012–13, the zone qualification format was dropped in favor of a phase qualification system. All teams played 45 games in a "classification phase". The top eight ranked teams from this phase moved on to the "qualification phase" to determine playoff participants. In 2016–17, the number of teams in the qualification phase was dropped to six. In 2020–21, the phase format was removed from the league, and the league determined qualifiers based on a single table of standings, with the top teams at the end of the regular season advancing to the postseason, thereby ending divisional play.

To accommodate the 2013 World Baseball Classic, contested in March, the league took a six-week break after the all-star game of February 3. The league played a shortened 45-game season, with all 16 teams competing in a single table format (doing away with the regular two division format). The bottom eight seeded teams then played amongst themselves in the consolation round, while the top eight did the same for the championship. In 2014, the consolation round format for the midseason was officially adopted, effectively making it a de facto wild card game with the winners having a chance to make it to the postseason.

=== 2022–present ===
After no games were played for a year following the end of the 2020–21 season in January 2021, play resumed with a 75-game schedule, all contested within a single calendar year for the first time, as the 2022 season spanned January to June. The change to a summer league schedule was made official, and starting with the 2023 season, the league runs from March to July with a schedule of 75 games per team in the regular season, followed by three playoff rounds culminating in a championship. The Cuban Elite League was initiated to maintain active competition during the winter months.

== Current teams ==
| Team | Nickname | City | Founded | Venue | Capacity | Ref. |
|---|---|---|---|---|---|---|
| Artemisa | Cazadores | Artemisa | 2011 | Estadio 26 de Julio | 6,000 | |
| Camagüey | Toros | Camagüey | 1977 | Estadio Cándido González | 14,000 | |
| Ciego de Ávila | Tigres | Ciego de Ávila | 1977 | José Ramón Cepero Stadium | 13,000 | |
| Cienfuegos | Elefantes | Cienfuegos | 1977 | Cinco de Septiembre Stadium | 15,600 | |
| Granma | Alazanes | Bayamo | 1977 | Mártires de Barbados Stadium | 10,000 | |
| Guantánamo | Indios | Guantánamo | 1977 | Nguyen Van Troi Stadium | 14,000 | |
| Holguín | Cachorros | Holguín | 1977 | Calixto García Íñiguez Stadium | 30,000 | |
| Industriales | Leones | Havana | 1961 | Estadio Latinoamericano | 55,000 | |
| Isla de la Juventud | Piratas | Nueva Gerona | 1977 | Estadio Cristóbal Labra | 5,000 | |
| Las Tunas | Leñadores | Las Tunas | 1977 | Estadio Julio Antonio Mella | 13,000 | |
| Matanzas | Cocodrilos | Matanzas | 1992 | Victoria de Girón Stadium | 22,000 | |
| Mayabeque | Huracanes | San José de las Lajas | 2011 | Estadio Nelson Fernández | 8,000 | |
| Pinar del Río | Vegueros | Pinar del Río | 1992 | Estadio Capitán San Luis | 8,000 | |
| Sancti Spíritus | Gallos | Sancti Spíritus | 1977 | José Antonio Huelga Stadium | 13,000 | |
| Santiago de Cuba | Avispas | Santiago de Cuba | 1977 | Estadio Guillermón Moncada | 25,000 | |
| Villa Clara | Naranjas | Santa Clara | 1961 | Estadio Augusto César Sandino | 18,000 | |

Location of teams in the Cuban National Series since the 2012–13 season

== National Series champions ==
Before the 1985–86 season, champions were decided by final regular-season standings. The 1962–63 and 1971–72 seasons saw two teams finish tied for first, so three-game tie-breaker series were played to determine a champion.

A postseason was first played in January 1986, contested by four teams. Initially staged as a round-robin tournament, it changed to a bracket tournament in January 1990. In January 1998, the postseason was expanded to eight teams.

Instances where a team has won the championship more than once are numbered in parentheses. In seasons that spanned two calendar years, the "Year" column is when the season ended.

| Ed. | Year | Winning team | Manager |
|---|---|---|---|
| 1 | 1961–62 | Occidentales | Fermín Guerra |
| 2 | 1962–63 | Industriales | Ramón Carneado |
| 3 | 1963–64 | Industriales (2) | Ramón Carneado |
| 4 | 1964–65 | Industriales (3) | Ramón Carneado |
| 5 | 1965–66 | Industriales (4) | Ramón Carneado |
| 6 | 1966–67 | Orientales | Roberto Ledo |
| 7 | 1967–68 | Habana | Juan Gómez |
| 8 | 1968–69 | Villa Clara | Servio Borges |
| 9 | 1969–70 | Henequeneros | Miguel A. Domínguez |
| 10 | 1970–71 | Villa Clara (2) | Servio Borges |
| 11 | 1971–72 | Villa Clara (3) | Pedro P. Delgado |
| 12 | 1972–73 | Industriales (5) | Pedro Chávez |
| 13 | 1973–74 | Habana (2) | Jorge Trigoura |
| 14 | 1974–75 | Agricultores | Orlando Leroux |
| 15 | 1975–76 | Ganaderos | Carlos Gómez |
| 16 | 1976–77 | Citricultores | Juan Bregio |
| 17 | 1977–78 | Vegueros | José M. Pineda |
| 18 | 1978–79 | Sancti Spíritus | Cándido Andrade |
| 19 | 1979–80 | Santiago de Cuba | Manuel Miyar |
| 20 | 1980–81 | Vegueros (2) | José M. Pineda |
| 21 | 1981–82 | Vegueros (3) | Jorge Fuentes |
| 22 | 1982–83 | Villa Clara (4) | Eduardo Martín |
| 23 | 1983–84 | Citricultores (2) | Tomás Soto |
| 24 | 1984–85 | Vegueros (4) | Jorge Fuentes |
| 25 | 1985–86 | Industriales (6) | Pedro Chávez |
| 26 | 1986–87 | Vegueros (5) | Jorge Fuentes |
| 27 | 1987–88 | Vegueros (6) | Jorge Fuentes |
| 28 | 1988–89 | Santiago de Cuba (2) | Higinio Vélez |
| 29 | 1989–90 | Henequeneros (2) | Gerardo Junco |
| 30 | 1990–91 | Henequeneros (3) | Gerardo Junco |
| 31 | 1991–92 | Industriales (7) | Jorge Trigoura |
| 32 | 1992–93 | Villa Clara (5) | Pedro Jova |
| 33 | 1993–94 | Villa Clara (6) | Pedro Jova |
| 34 | 1994–95 | Villa Clara (7) | Pedro Jova |
| 35 | 1995–96 | Industriales (8) | Pedro Medina |
| 36 | 1996–97 | Pinar del Río | Jorge Fuentes |
| 37 | 1997–98 | Pinar del Río (2) | Alfonso Urquiola |
| 38 | 1998–99 | Santiago de Cuba (3) | Higinio Vélez |
| 39 | 1999–2000 | Santiago de Cuba (4) | Higinio Vélez |
| 40 | 2000–01 | Santiago de Cuba (5) | Higinio Vélez |
| 41 | 2001–02 | Holguín | Héctor Hernández |
| 42 | 2002–03 | Industriales (9) | Rey Vicente Anglada |
| 43 | 2003–04 | Industriales (10) | Rey Vicente Anglada |
| 44 | 2004–05 | Santiago de Cuba (6) | Antonio Pacheco |
| 45 | 2005–06 | Industriales (11) | Rey Vicente Anglada |
| 46 | 2006–07 | Santiago de Cuba (7) | Antonio Pacheco |
| 47 | 2007–08 | Santiago de Cuba (8) | Antonio Pacheco |
| 48 | 2008–09 | La Habana | Esteban Lombillo |
| 49 | 2009–10 | Industriales (12) | Germán Mesa |
| 50 | 2010–11 | Pinar del Río (3) | Alfonso Urquiola |
| 51 | 2011–12 | Ciego de Ávila | Roger Machado |
| 52 | 2012–13 | Villa Clara (8) | Ramón Moré |
| 53 | 2013–14 | Pinar del Río (4) | Alfonso Urquiola |
| 54 | 2014–15 | Ciego de Ávila (2) | Roger Machado |
| 55 | 2015–16 | Ciego de Ávila (3) | Roger Machado |
| 56 | 2016–17 | Granma | Carlos Martí |
| 57 | 2017–18 | Granma (2) | Carlos Martí |
| 58 | 2018–19 | Las Tunas | Pablo Civil |
| 59 | 2019–20 | Matanzas | Armando Ferrer Ruiz |
| 60 | 2020–21 | Granma (3) | Carlos Martí |
| 61 | 2022 | Granma (4) | Carlos Martí |
| 62 | 2023 | Las Tunas (2) | Abeysi Pantoja |
| 63 | 2024 | Las Tunas (3) | Abeysi Pantoja |
| 64 | 2025–26 | Matanzas (2) | Armando Ferrer Ruiz |

== Statistical leaders ==
| † | Denotes elected to Cuban Baseball Hall of Fame |

=== Career leaders ===
Batting leaders
| Stat | Player | Years | Total | Team(s) |
|---|---|---|---|---|
| AVG | Omar Linares† | 1983–2002 | .368 | Pinar del Río |
| HR | Orestes Kindelán† | 1982–2002 | 487 | Santiago de Cuba |
| RBI | Frederich Cepeda | 1998–present | 1561 | Sancti Spíritus |
| R | Enrique Díaz | 1987–2012 | 1638 | Metropolitanos |
| H | Frederich Cepeda | 1998–present | 2659 | Sancti Spíritus |
| BB | Frederich Cepeda | 1998–present | 2394 | Sancti Spíritus |
| SB | Enrique Díaz | 1987–2012 | 726 | Metropolitanos |
| SLG | Omar Linares† | 1983–2002 | .644 | Pinar del Río |
| OPS | Omar Linares† | 1983–2002 | 1.131 | Pinar del Río |

Pitching leaders
| Stat | Player | Years | Total | Team(s) |
|---|---|---|---|---|
| W | Pedro Luis Lazo | 1991–2010 | 257 | Pinar del Río |
| CG | Braudilio Vinent | 1967–1987 | 265 | Pinar del Río |
| G | José Ángel García | 1999–present | 839 | La Habana, Isla de la Juventud, Ciego de Ávila, Sancti Spíritus, Las Tunas, Artemisa |
| IP | Carlos Yanes | 1984–2012 | 3863.1 | Isla de la Juventud |
| ERA | José Antonio Huelga | 1969–1974 | 1.48 | Orientales, Azucareros |

== See also ==
- Cuban National Series Most Valuable Player Award
- Cuban National Series Rookie of the Year Award
- Baseball awards#Cuba
- List of organized baseball leagues
