= Gallos de Sancti Spíritus =

Baseball team in the Cuban National Series

- Logo

Information
- League: Cuban National Series
- Location: Sancti Spíritus, Sancti Spíritus Province
- Ballpark: José Antonio Huelga Stadium
- Established: 1977; 48 years ago
- Nickname(s): Gallos (Roosters); Espirituanos (Spirituans)
- League championships: 1 (1978–79)
- Colors: Blue, orange and white
- Manager: Eriel Sánchez

Current uniforms
Home	Away

Gallos de Sancti Spíritus (English: Sancti Spíritus Roosters) is a baseball team in the Cuban National Series. The team won the series championship in 1978–79. The Gallos have advanced to the National Series semifinals in each of the past two seasons; 2004–05 and 2005–06.

== History ==
The team was established in 1977, following the amendments to the Cuban Constitution in 1976 that created the Sancti Spíritus Province (previously part of Las Villas); under the new structure, every province was required to have a team participating in the National Series.

The team made its debut in the 1977–78 season, led by manager César Pérez, with the 1976–77 Rookie of the Year Lourdes Gourriel leading the Espirituanos’ offense. The team finished 15th with a 20–30 record.

The following season, under manager Cándido Andrade, Sancti Spíritus finished first with a 39–12 record, winning the Cuban championship, the first (and as of 2025, the only) in the team's history.

Three Sancti Spíritus players were part of Cuba's team at the 2006 World Baseball Classic: outfielder Frederich Cepeda, infielder Yuli Gurriel (who later defected to the United States and played in Major League Baseball) and catcher Eriel Sánchez, current manager of the club.

There are no precise records indicating when the Gallos (Roosters) nickname was first used. The name gained strength after the 2002 final series against Holguín, that the team lost 3–4. In 2013, after decades of being known as the Gallos, Sancti Spíritus finally incorporated the rooster into the club’s logo.

== Team stadiums ==
Every time a season starts, the team not only plays at José Antonio Huelga Stadium; their official stadium, but they also play at other seven stadiums around Sancti Spíritus Province:

- Genaro Melero Stadium – Jatibonico (the second most important besides José Antonio Huelga Stadium)
- Mártires de Cabaiguán Stadium – Cabaiguán
- Luis Torres Stadium – Yaguajay
- Rolando Rodríguez Stadium – Trinidad
- Julio Antonio Mella Stadium – Taguasco
- Mártires de Río Zaza Stadium – La Sierpe
- Fidel Claro Stadium – Fomento

== Roster ==
Gallos de Sancti Spíritus roster
Players		Coaches
Pitchers: 15 (Cuba) Juan Carlos Bello; 65 (Cuba) Carlos Benavides; 89 (Cuba) Fernando Betanzo; 86 (Cuba) José Luis Brañas; 48 (Cuba) Miguel Dávila; 27 (Cuba) Yanielquis Duardo; 62 (Cuba) Leandro Forteza; 90 (Cuba) Yohannys Hernández; 21 (Cuba) Reicher Gómez; 91 (Cuba) José Grandales; 52 (Cuba) Alex Guerra; 26 (Cuba) Yoandi López; 22 (Cuba) José Martínez; 42 (Cuba) Yankiel Mauris; 34 (Cuba) Daniel Reyes; 30 (Cuba) José Carlos Santos; 35 (Cuba) José Eduardo Santos; 59 (Cuba) Ariel Zerquera	Catchers: 31 (Cuba) Alexei Febles; 11 (Cuba) José Guerra; 8 (Cuba) Yadiel Guerra; 53 (Cuba) Osdani Llorente; Infielders: 44 (Cuba) Liuber Gallo; 51 (Cuba) Yasser García; 13 (Cuba) Miguel Martínez; 2 (Cuba) Rodolexis Moreno; 29 (Cuba) Lázaro Obregón; 66 (Cuba) Leandro Pérez; 7 (Cuba) Enmanuel Rodríguez; 10 (Cuba) Laisnel Rodríguez; 25 (Cuba) Leroy Rojas; 5 (Cuba) Erien Sánchez; 3 (Cuba) Sammy Valera; Outfielders: 24 (Cuba) Frederich Cepeda Jr.; 23 (Cuba) Frederich Cepeda; 32 (Cuba) Daniel Fernández; 12 (Cuba) Lázaro Fernández; 99 (Cuba) Delvis Hernández; 50 (Cuba) Daniel González; 18 (Cuba) Yean Carlos González; 71 (Cuba) Rey Ricardo	Manager: 5 (Cuba) Eriel Sánchez; Coaches: 34 (Cuba) Noelvis Hernández (pitching); 18 (Cuba) Yunier Mendoza; 37 (Cuba) Rafael Muñoz; 82 (Cuba) David Pérez (bench); 28 (Cuba) Fredy Rodríguez (pitching); Roster updated on 26 December 2025

== National Series MVPs ==
The following Sancti Spíritus players have won the National Series MVP award.

- 1994 Lourdes Gurriel
- 2001 Maels Rodríguez
- 2005 Yulieski Gurriel
- 2006 Yulieski Gurriel

Other notable players include:

- Jose Antonio Huelga (pitcher) known as El Heroe de Cartagena (The Hero of Cartagena)
- Modesto Verdura (pitcher)
- Miguel Rojas (second base)
- Owen Blandino (infield)
- Antonio Muñoz (first baseman)
- Roberto "El Cana" Ramos (pitcher)
- Yovani Aragón (pitcher)
- Ifreidi Coss (pitcher)
- José Raúl Delgado (catcher)
- Luis Enrique Gourriel (outfield)
- Miguel Hernández (pitcher)
- Osvaldo Oliva (infield)
- Rigoberto Rodríguez (shortstop)
- Ruperto Zamora (first base)
- Ángel Peña (pitcher)
- Maels Rodriguez (pitcher)
- Lázaro Martínez
- José Méndez
- Tony Simó (pitcher)
