= Piratas de Isla de la Juventud =

- Logo

Information
- League: Cuban National Series
- Location: Nueva Gerona, Isla de la Juventud
- Ballpark: Cristóbal Labra Stadium
- Established: 1977; 49 years ago
- Nickname(s): Piratas (Pirates), Pineros (Pinemen)
- Colors: Turquoise, black and white
- Manager: Dioel Reyes

Current uniforms
Home	Away

Piratas de Isla de la Juventud, or simply Piratas de la Isla is a baseball team in the Cuban National Series. Based in Nueva Gerona, Isla de la Juventud, the Piratas reached the Finals of the 54th Cuban National Series, remaining as runners-up.

== History ==
In 1977, Isla de la Juventud (then called Isla de los Pinos) received the opportunity to have an independent baseball team. Before 1976, Isla de la Juventud was part of La Habana Province and therefore did not have a baseball club.

From their inception in 1977 until the mid-1990s, Isla de la Juventud was a perennial cellar-dweller in the National Series. However, since the 1998–99 season, when they took Industriales to a seventh game in the western final, they have been a playoff contender every year.

== Roster ==
Piratas de Isla de la Juventud roster – 2022–23 Cuban National Series
Players		Coaches
Pitchers: 90 Kevin Baños; 52 Jonathan Carbó; 35 Misael Fonseca; 86 Yunier Gamboa; 18 Yadier Garay; 15 Yordanis García; 91 Lázaro Guerrero; 19 Alberto Hechevarría; 77 Kendry Hernández; 48 Maykol La Rosa; 4 Miguel Ángel Lastra; 92 Gabriel Leyva; 98 Edislandy Monteagudo; 58 Dorvis Navarro; 42 Franky Quintana; 69 Lisvier Reyes; 87 Lázaro Rodríguez; 37 Roberto Rodríguez; 93 Eric Valenzuela	Catchers: 20 Jordanys Acebal; 13 Misael Cañete; 45 Alejandro Capote; 40 Luis Morales; 10 César Vega; Infielders: 3 Laidel Águila; 28 Andro Carreño; 11 Dainier Gálvez; 71 Boris Madrazo; 24 Mario Miranda; 88 Luis Felipe Rivera; 2 Eddy Rodríguez; 33 Luis Ángel Rojas; 5 Jander Santamaría; 61 Yasmani Viera; Outfielders: 23 Alexander Almarales; 22 José Luis Bring; 17 Sergio Espinosa; 29 Teivis Paumier; 9 Eliseo Rojas; 14 Leonardo Urgellés	Manager: 46 Dioel Reyes; Coaches: 23 José Acosta (coach); 19 Felipe Gálvez (bench); 47 Rusbel Hernández (coach); 20 Ricardo Leyva (pitching); 15 Albin Zamora (pitching); Roster updated on 27 June 2023

== Achievements ==
=== Awards ===
==== Most Valuable Player ====
- 1998–99 – Michel Enríquez

==== Rookie of the Year ====
- 1987–88 – Alexander Ramos
- 2014–15 – Alfredo Rodríguez
