= Indios de Guantánamo =

Information
- League: Cuban National Series
- Location: Guantánamo, Guantánamo Province
- Ballpark: Nguyen Van Troi Stadium
- Established: 1977; 48 years ago
- Nickname(s): Indios (Indians)
- Colors: Black, gold and white
- Manager: Agustín Lescaille

Current uniforms
Home	Away

Indios de Guantánamo (English: Guantánamo Indians) is a baseball team in the Cuban National Series. Based in the easternmost Cuban province of Guantánamo, the Indios have had uneven results, though they advanced to the playoffs in three straight years from 1997 to 1999. The team has never won any championship.

== Roster ==
Indios de Guantánamo roster – 2020–21 Cuban National Series
Players		Coaches
Pitchers: 15 Orlandis Martínez; 16 Jorge Sánchez; 20 Alexander Valiente; 22 Leonardo Moreira; 25 Enyer Fernández; 26 Raciel Bles; 28 Pablo Salgado; 47 Frank Navarro; 52 Luis Martín; 54 Dairon Mena; 55 Ubaldo Ravelo; 69 Andiovis Baró; 75 Roeldis Martínez; 90 Yeudis Reyes; 93 Luis Enrique Castillo; 99 Sandy Cristian	Catchers: 4 Félix Carbonell; 14 Niorlis Núñez; 27 Pedro Revilla; 45 Yasmani Velázquez; Infielders: 5 Eulogio Marcilli; 6 Orlando Morales; 11 Arisclemé Bárzaga; 12 Yusley Aramburo; 13 Luis Ángel Sánchez; 13 Adrián Rivera; 21 Daykel Manso; 24 Leovanis Brook; 43 Orneydis Rodríguez; 49 Yoelkis Baró; 61 Ricardo Preval; Outfielders: 10 Robert Delgado; 19 Luis Hechavarría; 23 Leonelkis Escalante; 30 Carlos Figueredo; 34 Abel Montoya; 51 Biorgelvis Roque; 56 Over Cremet; 79 Yoel Darcés	Manager: 4 Agustín Lescaille; Coaches: 30 Leandro González; 40 Nala Charadán; 16 Epifanio Dominico; 14 Alfonso Ilivianes; 35 Roberto González

== Notable players ==
- Giorgi Díaz (pitcher)
- Osvaldo Duvergel (pitcher)
- Dalier Hinojosa (pitcher)
- Alfonso Ilivanes (pitcher)
- Agustín Lescaille (first base)
- Oscar Rodríguez (outfield)
- Andrés Telemaco (second base)
