= Leñadores de Las Tunas =

Baseball team in the Cuban National Series

- Logo

Information
- League: Cuban National Series
- Location: Las Tunas, Las Tunas Province
- Ballpark: Julio Antonio Mella Stadium
- Established: 1977; 49 years ago
- Nickname(s): Leñadores (Lumberjacks); Espinosos (Thornies)
- Championships: 3 (2018–19, 2023, 2024)
- Colors: Green, red and white
- Manager: Abeicy Pantoja Díaz

Current uniforms
Home	Away

Leñadores de Las Tunas (English: Las Tunas Lumberjacks) is a baseball team in the Cuban National Series. Based in the city of Las Tunas, the Leñadores, or Magos (also known as the Espinosos), were long a perennial last-place team in Group C. Led by Osmani Urrutia in the early 1990s, the Magos were competitive, finishing with winning records in 2004–05 and 2005–06. Shortstop Alex Guerrero, hit a .303/.385/.526 slash line with 103 home runs and 413 RBI in 559 games from 2004-05 through 2011-12.

The teams plays at the Julio Antonio Mella Stadium, inaugurated in 1945 and with a capacity 15,000 spectators.

Las Tunas won the championship for the first time in 2019, defeating Villa Clara 4 games to 1.

Following their 2024 championship, the Leñadores were invited to participate in the 2025 Baseball Champions League Americas tournament.

They are currently considered the best team in the Cuban National League (SNB); over the past decade, they have delivered highly consistent performances, achieved excellent results, and won numerous medals. They have even defeated their rivals, 'Leonas de La Habana'—also known as 'Industriales'. Led primarily by manager Abecy Pantoja and Pablo Civil, and featuring key players such as Yosvany Alarcón, Marco Abradelo, Yolkis Cruz, Danel Castro, Roberto Baldoquín, Rafael Viñales, Carlos Juan Viera, and many others.

== Roster ==
Tigres de Ciego de Ávila roster – 2020–21 Cuban National Series
Players		Coaches
Pitchers: 17 Yudier Rodríguez; 22 Yordey Fuentes; 23 Alberto Civil; 35 Yerlandis Osorio; 42 Yasel Labrada; 49 José Armando Peña; 51 Yoalkis Cruz; 53 Alejandro Meneses; 43 Liomil González; 53 Yadir Rangel; 54 Ángel Sánchez; 74 Anier Pérez; 82 Keniel Ferraz; 83 Carlos Viera; 85 Yosbel Alarcón; 90 Rodolfo Díaz; 94 Elexis Valera	Catchers: 11 Yosvani Alarcón; 31 Oberto Coca; 34 Rafael Viñales; Infielders: 1 Danel Castro; 10 Yordanis Alarcón; 19 Luis Antonio Pérez; 11 José Ramón Alfonso; 20 Yudier Rondón; 21 Andrés de la Cruz; 24 Manuel Ávila; 28 Denis Peña; 30 Ernesto Lalana; 79 Eduardo García; 87 Yaser Pérez; Outfielders: 8 Andrés Quiala; 16 Leonis Figueredo; 27 Odellán Tineis; 32 Dailier Peña; 38 Héctor Castillo; 46 Osmani Urrutia; 55 David Fernández; 56 Yuniesky Larduert; 59 Jorge Johnson	Manager: 9 Pablo Alberto Civil; Coaches: 4 Jorge Hierrezuelo; 12 Abeisy Pantoja; 36 Rolando Ponce de León; 25 Rodolfo Correa; 18 Félix Núñez; 45 Reynaldo Infante

== 2019 Caribbean Series roster ==
Cuba 2019 Caribbean Series Roster
Players		Coaches
Pitchers: (Cuba) Yosbel Alarcón; (Cuba) Freddy Álvarez; (Cuba) Lázaro Blanco; (Cuba) Alberto Civil; (Cuba) Yoalkis Cruz; (Cuba) Vladimir García; (Cuba) Dariel Góngora; (Cuba) Raidel Martínez; (Cuba) Yadián Martínez; (Cuba) Liván Moinelo; (Cuba) Yariel Rodríguez; (Cuba) Yudiel Rodríguez; (Cuba) Yoanni Yera; updated on 28 January 2019	Catchers: (Cuba) Yosvany Alarcón; (Cuba) Oscar Valdés; Infielders: (Cuba) Jorge Alomá; (Cuba) Alexander Ayala; (Cuba) Carlos Benítez; (Cuba) Danel Castro; (Cuba) Yurisbel Gracial; (Cuba) Yordan Manduley; (Cuba) Yordanis Samón; Outfielders: (Cuba) Frederich Cepeda; (Cuba) Alfredo Despaigne; (Cuba) Jorge Johnson; (Cuba) Yunieski Larduet; (Cuba) Andrés Quiala; (Cuba) Yurién Vizcaíno	Manager: (Cuba) Pablo Alberto Civil; Coaches

== Baseball Champions League Americas record ==
Year	Venue	Finish	Wins	Losses	Win%	Manager
2025	Mexico City	2nd	3	2	.600	(Cuba) Abeicy Pantoja
Total			3	2	.600	

== Notable players ==
- Yordan Alvarez—2019 American League Rookie of the Year
- Danel Castro
- Pablo Alberto Civil
- Juan Carlos Luna
- Alex Guerrero
- Félix Núñez
- Joan Carlos Pedroso
- Gilberto Rodríguez
- Ermidelio Urrutia
- Henry Urrutia
- Osmani Urrutia—2003-04 Cuban National Series Most Valuable Player (MVP)
