= Alazanes de Granma =

Baseball team

- Logo

Information
- League: Cuban National Series
- Location: Bayamo, Granma Province
- Ballpark: Mártires de Barbados Stadium
- Established: 1977; 49 years ago
- Nickname(s): Alazanes (Chestnuts); Montañeses (Mountaineers); Cafetaleros (Coffee Growers)
- League championships: 4 (2016–17, 2017–18, 2020–21, 2022)
- Colors: Blue, red and white
- Manager: Carlos Martí
- Media: TeleRebelde

Current uniforms
Home	Away

Alazanes de Granma is a baseball team in the Cuban National Series, based in the eastern province of Granma. Until the 2016-2017 season, the Alazanes were a frequent contender, but had never advanced to a National Series final. However, in 2017 Granma not only made it to the Cuban National Series final, but swept Ciego de Ávila to win the series, breaking a 40-year record of being seen as underdogs who could not compete with dominant powerhouse teams.

The team's nickname is the "Alazanes," which refers to horses which have sorrel hair.

== History ==
=== Early days ===
Granma first appeared in the XVII Cuban National Series of Baseball during the 1977-1978 season, ending in 11th place in the inaugural season.

Agustín Arias played with the team for a short-term prior to his retirement, which a time of relative success for the team, but after his retirement the team become known as a mediocre team, often having a losing (below .500) season record.

=== The Landing of the Sorrel ===
Granma's history of losing was about to change, starting in the 1986-1987 season, and by 1988-1989, Granma made it to its first postseason, ending in third place.

But consistency continued to be a problem with Granma reaching the playoffs in 1989-1990, 1991-1992 and 1999-2000, but also having many losing regular season records.

Significant Granma pitchers in this era included Ernesto Guevara Ramos, Ciro Silvino Licea, Alfredo Fonseca, Manuel Vega Tamayo and Misael López Moreno. Offensively, star Granma players included Pedro Mora, Hermes Ortega, Marcos Naranjo and the brothers Valerio, Santiago and Victor Vicente Bejerano Morales.

=== 21st Century Performance ===
Granam continued to build in the first decade of the new century, making playoff appearances in 2001, 2003, 2004, 2005 and 2006, but then went through a downcycle of not appearing in the Series playoffs again until 2011, with appearances in 2012, 2015 and 2016.

Finally in 2017, despite negative predictions by many commentators, Granma won the Cuban National Series, sweeping Ciego de Avila in four. Team manager Carlos Marti Santos dedicated the win to the memory of Fidel Castro and to the Granma fans. Alfredo Despaigne Rodriguez (Olympic medalist and player in Japanese and Mexican league baseball) said that the Series win was the greatest moment of his life in baseball.

See 2016-2017 Season - Granma (baseball)

In 2023, Granma are going to the first Baseball Champions League.

== Roster ==
Alazanes de Granma roster – 2020–21 Cuban National Series
Players		Coaches
Pitchers: 9 César García; 14 Miguel Paradelo; 16 Kelbis Rodríguez; 27 Juan Danilo Pérez; 29 Erluis Blanco; 35 Leosdani Sánchez; 42 Sergio Ramírez; 71 Leandro Martínez; 73 Darién Creach; 74 Carlos Santana; 78 Joel Mojena; 79 Lázaro Blanco; 89 Yunier Castillo; 93 Luis Miguel González; 99 Manel Frómeta	Catchers: 13 Ariel Pestano; 26 Gumersindo Cisneros; 66 Iván Prieto; Infielders: 4 Yulián Milán; 5 Carlos Benítez; 6 Yonisbel Pompa; 10 Miguel González; 12 Darlin Jiménez; 15 Guillermo García; 21 Guillermo Avilés; 24 Lázaro Cedeño; 52 Osvaldo Abreu; Outfielders: 1 Roel Santos; 3 Darién García; 17 Francisco Venecia; 18 Raico Santos; 22 Alexquemer Sánchez; 23 Darién Palma; 54 Alfredo Despaigne; 88 Miguel Pita	Manager: 45 Carlo Martí; Coaches: 77 Ramón Rodríguez; 43 Leonardo Soto; 60 Luis Alberto Ferrales; 75 Luis Ernesto González; 62 Ciro Licea

== Management ==
Granma has been managed by Carlos Marti Santos for 29 of the 40 seasons of the team's existence (1977-1997, 1998-2005, 2007–2008 and 2014-2017). Others managers have included Arnaldo Iznaga, Ramón Rodríguez, Marcos Fonseca, Osvaldo Avilés, Ángel Ortega, and Indalecio Alejandrez.

== Notable players ==
- Yoenis Céspedes, outfielder in Major League Baseball (MLB)
- Alfredo Despaigne
