= Sabuesos de Holguín =

Cuban baseball team

Information
- League: Cuban National Series
- Location: Holguín, Holguín Province
- Ballpark: Calixto García Íñiguez Stadium
- Established: 1977; 48 years ago
- Nickname(s): Sabuesos (Hounds)
- League championships: 1 (2002)
- Colors: Dark blue and white
- Manager: Francisco Martínez

Current uniforms
Home	Away

Sabuesos de Holguín (English: Holguín Hounds) is a baseball team in the Cuban National Series. Based in eastern Holguín province, the Sabuesos have historically been a poor team, but made a surprising run in 2002 to claim their only championship.

== Roster ==
Sabuesos de Holguín roster – 2020–21 Cuban National Series
Players		Coaches
Pitchers: 7 Wilson Paredes; 20 José Antonio Rodríguez; 22 Yunieski Escalona; 26 Carlos Alberto Santiesteban; 27 Yoidel Castañeda; 38 Norge Luis Cobas; 48 Luis Ángel Gómez; 52 Yusmel Velázquez; 54 Meracles Oriz; 56 Jesús Enrique Pérez; 59 Rubén Rodríguez; 62 José Antonio Sánchez; 75 Carlos Vera; 93 Rafael Sánchez; 99 Emmanuel Chapman	Catchers: 24 Franklin Aballe; 28 Luis Alberto Laffita; 46 Nelson Batista; 55 Michel Álvarez; Infielders: 9 Noel González; 10 Yosvany Millán; 12 Pedro Almeida; 29 Michel Gorguet; 35 Darío Pérez; 36 Ernesto Torres; 42 Yordan Manduley; 44 Ihuner Anache; 64 Yeison Pacheco; 88 Marnolkis Aguiar; Outfielders: 3 Laindel Leyva; 17 Leandro Aguilera; 21 Jorge Luis Peña; 37 Oscar López; 51 Yasiel González; 74 Edward Magaña	Manager: 63 Francisco Martínez; Coaches: 25 Héctor Salomón; 2 Mario Torres; 26 Luis Enrique Rodríguez; 12 Yoenis Duboys; 27 Osmani del Río; 24 Francisco Aballe

== Notable players ==
- Osvaldo Fernández (pitcher)
- Aroldis Chapman (pitcher)
