= Elefantes de Cienfuegos =

Cuban baseball team

- Logo

Information
- League: Cuban National Series
- Location: Cienfuegos, Cienfuegos Province
- Ballpark: Cinco de Septiembre Stadium
- Established: 1977; 49 years ago
- Nickname: Elefantes (Elephants)
- Colors: Green, black and white
- Manager: Alain Álvarez

Current uniforms
Home	Away

Elefantes de Cienfuegos (English: Cienfuegos Elephants) is a baseball team in the Cuban National Series. Based in the southern city of Cienfuegos, the Elefantes had their best season in their second year of existence, finishing fourth in the National Series. The team achieved its best result in the 2009–10 season finishing third.

There were two pitchers on the Cuba national baseball team at the 2006 World Baseball Classic: Adiel Palma and Yosvany Pérez.

== Roster ==
Elefantes de Cienfuegos roster – 2020–21 Cuban National Series
Players		Coaches
Pitchers: 23 José A. Osuna; 37 Félix Fuentes; 41 Abel Campos; 42 Camilo Ballester; 48 Reemberto Barreto; 49 Yasmany Insua; 52 Carlos Ramírez; 53 Luis Serpa; 63 Alex Pérez; 66 Jorge Hernández; 74 Islay Sotolongo; 86 Bárbaro Herrera; 90 Víctor Rodríguez; 91 Hermes González; 99 Adrián Bueno	Catchers: 4 Richel López; 8 Pedro González; 55 Asiel Rodríguez; 71 Edson Portela; Infielders: 1 Luis Vicente Mateo; 2 Orlando Santos; 6 Frank Peralta; 9 César Prieto; 10 Pavel Quesada; 13 Adrián Rivera; 14 Daniel Pérez; 21 Bárbaro Rodríguez; 27 Edwin Vassel; 51 Cristian Borges; Outfielders: 7 Félix Rodríguez; 17 Yusniel Ibáñez; 31 Carlos Chirino; 38 Yordy Wilson; 54 Juan Miguel Soriano; 56 Luis Enrique González; 73 Alexander Sevilla	Manager: 24 Alain Álvarez; Coaches: 34 Emilio Chaviano; 26 Reemberto Rossell; 59 Leonel Mesa; 18 Reynaldo Costa; 35 Dianis Guedes; 19 Jorge Rodríguez

== National Series MVPs ==
- 1980 Pedro José Rodríguez
- 2011 José Dariel Abreu

== Other notable players ==
- José Dariel Abreu
- Roberto Almarales
- Osvaldo Arias
- Erisbel Arruebarrena
- Norberto González (pitcher)
- Alex Guerrero
- Sixto Hernández
- Rolando Macías
- Yoan Moncada
- Antonio Muñoz
- Adiel Palma (pitcher)
- Yosvani Pérez (pitcher)
- Yasiel Puig
- Alexander Quintero (pitcher)
- Iván Rojas
- Remberto Rosell
- Yangency Socarrás
