= Naranjas de Villa Clara =

Azucareros de Villa Clara
- Logo

Information
- League: Cuban National Series (East League Group D)
- Location: Santa Clara
- Ballpark: Estadio Augusto César Sandino
- Founded: 1962
- Nickname(s): Naranjas; Azucareros; Leopardos
- League championships: 8 (1968–69, 1970–71, 1971–72, 1982–83, 1992–93, 1993–94, 1994–95, 2012–13)
- 2009-2010: 50-39 : Group D classified. Lost to Ciego de Avila in the playoffs.
- Colors: Orange, black and white
- Manager: Ramón Moré

Current uniforms
Home	Away

Villa Clara is a baseball club that plays in the Cuban National Series, representing the province of the same name. Sometimes referred to as the "Naranjas" (Oranges), the club has also been nicknamed the "Azucareros" (Sugar Growers) and the "Leopardos" (Leopards), the latter name dating back to Santa Clara in the Cuban Professional League.

Based in the provincial capital city of Santa Clara, the Azucareros were one of the original four teams to compete in the 1962 Cuban National Series, the first season of Cuban baseball after the Cuban Revolution and the end of the professional Cuban Winter League. Villa Clara was one of the National Series's most successful squads in the 1990s and 2000s, winning three consecutive championships from 1993 to 1995. They also lost the 1996, 2003, 2004 and 2010 finals to the Industriales.

Several Villa Clara players have been members of the Cuba national baseball team in the World Baseball Classic: Ariel Borrero, Luis Borroto, Eduardo Paret and Ariel Pestano were on the roster in the 2006 tournament, while Leonys Martín, Eduardo Paret, Yolexis Ulacia and Pestano were in 2009.

== History ==
Azucareros were one of four teams to compete in the inaugural Cuban National Series in 1962, along with Occidentales, Orientales, and Habana (now known as Industriales). The team was managed by Tony Castaño, the former skipper of the Havana Sugar Kings of the Florida International League who had elected to remain in Cuba after the Revolution; Castaño previously led the Elefantes de Cienfuegos to two consecutive Cuban Winter League titles. During this early period, the Azucareros represented not only Villa Clara, but also the modern provinces of Ciego de Ávila, Cienfuegos, and Sancti Spíritus.

The name Azucareros was to represent the workers of all sugar mills in Cuba. Under this name, the team won three championships in 1969, 1971 and 1972. After the separation of the teams, the Villa Clara club was known as La Naranja Mecánica (The Clockwork Orange) or Las Naranjas Explosivas (The Explosive Oranges) which are other nicknames, but not official. With the Naranjas moniker, Villa Clara won the National Series in 1983, led by Eduardo Martín Saura, and three consecutive years from 1993 through 1995 guided by Pedro Jova.

On June 18, 2013 Villa Clara defeated Matanzas by a score of 7–4, clinching their first league championship since the 1994–1995 season.

== Cuban National Series MVPs ==
- Modesto Verdura (P) (Azucareros)
- Antonio Muñoz 1B (Azucareros)
- Isidro Pérez P (Azucareros)
- Amado Zamora RF (Villa Clara)
- Oscar Machado LF (Villa Clara)

== Other notable players ==
- Rolando Arrojo
- Ariel Borrero (1B)
- Luis Borroto (P)
- Aledmys Díaz
- Yandy Díaz
- Leonys Martin
- Víctor Mesa (OF)
- Eliecer Montes de Oca (P)
- Eduardo Paret (SS)
- Ariel Pestano (C)
- Jorge Toca

== Defectors ==
Several Villa Clara players have left Cuba to play in the Major Leagues.

- Rolando Arrojo
- Yuniesky Betancourt
- Liván Hernández
- Dayán Viciedo
- Leonys Martin
- Aledmys Díaz
- Yandy Díaz
