= Cuban Elite League =

Professional baseball league in Cuba

- Current season, competition or edition: 2023–24 Cuban Elite League
- Sport: Baseball
- Founded: 2022
- President: Juan Reinaldo Pérez Pardo
- Organizing body: INDER
- No. of teams: 6
- Country: Cuba
- Most recent champions: Industriales (1st title)
- Broadcasters: Tele Rebelde; Cubavision International
- Level on pyramid: 1
- Related competitions: Caribbean Series

The Cuban Elite League (Spanish: Liga Élite del Beisbol Cubano, or LEB), is a baseball league in Cuba. It debuted in 2022 as the highest level of the Cuban baseball league system, playing a winter league. Beginning with the 2023-24 season, the Elite League comprised the top six teams from the summer-time Cuban National Series (SNB). In 2025, the Elite League shifted to a summer schedule, with the SNB returning to a winter schedule.

The league was formed in an effort to maximize the quality of Cuban baseball, bringing it closer to the other professional winter leagues of the Caribbean. Professional baseball was abolished in Cuba in 1961. A desire to bring together the best players from the National Series, as well as address the drain of Cuban talent from the island to more financially lucrative foreign leagues, contributed to the change of format in the league's second season (2023-24). Similar competitions had previously existed in the form of the Selective Series (1975-1995) and the Copa Revolución (1996-97).

== International competition ==
In 2023, the winner of the 2022-23 Elite League (Agricultores) represented Cuba at the 2023 Caribbean Series in Venezuela. However, in part due to fallout from the Cuban national team's appearance at the 2023 World Baseball Classic, the 2023-24 league champion was not invited to the 2024 Caribbean Series in Miami.

The 2023-24 LEB champion was invited to the prospective Intercontinental Series, to be held in Barranquilla in 2024, but the league declined the invitation, in part due to the inclusion of FEPCUBE, a team composed of Cuban expatriate and defected players. Pressure from the Cuban government eventually saw that tournament cancelled. Instead, LEB announced that it would take part a tournament labeled the "Copa Antillana" in Puerto Rico; however that tournament never materialized.

== Teams ==
=== 2022–23 season ===
In the Elite League's inaugural 2022-23 LEB season, the 16 teams of the Cuban National Series were grouped into six regional teams. However, this format was considered unpopular, and for the league's second season, the decision was made to include National Series teams.

| Team | SNB Grouping | City | Stadium | Capacity |
|---|---|---|---|---|
| Agricultores | Las Tunas; Granma | Bayamo | Mártires de Barbados Stadium | 10,000 |
| Cafetaleros | Santiago de Cuba; Holguín; Guantánamo | Holguín | Calixto García Íñiguez Stadium | 30,000 |
| Centrales | Matanzas; Cienfuegos; Villa Clara | Matanzas | Victoria de Girón Stadium | 22,000 |
| Ganaderos | Sancti Spíritus; Ciego de Ávila; Camagüey | Sancti Spíritus | José Antonio Huelga Stadium | 13,000 |
| Portuarios | Industriales; Mayabeque | Havana | Estadio Latinoamericano | 55,000 |
| Tabacaleros | Pinar del Río; Isla de la Juventud; Artemisa | Nueva Gerona | Estadio Cristóbal Labra | 5,000 |

=== 2023–24 season ===
Six clubs competed in the 2023–24 season. These six occupied the top spots in the 2023 Cuban National Series.

| 2023–24 Team | SNB Position | First season in LEB | No. of seasons of current spell in LEB | Top division titles | Most recent top division title |
|---|---|---|---|---|---|
| Cocodrilos de Matanzas | 6th | 2023–24 | 1 | 1 | 2019–20 |
| Industriales de La Habana | 5th | 2023–24 | 1 | 12 | 2009–10 |
| Avispas de Santiago de Cuba | 2nd | 2023–24 | 1 | 8 | 2007–08 |
| Gallos de Sancti Spíritus | 4th | 2023–24 | 1 | 1 | 1978–79 |
| Leñadores de Las Tunas | 1st | 2023–24 | 1 | 3 | 2018–19 |
| Cazadores de Artemisa | 3rd | 2023–24 | 1 | 0 | – |

=== 2025 season ===
In the Elite League's third season, out of the 16 teams that form part of the Cuban National Series, six of them qualified into the new league. These six teams occupied the top spots in the 2024 Cuban National Series.

| 2025 Team | SNB Position | First season in LEB | No. of seasons of current spell in LEB | Top division titles | Most recent top division title |
|---|---|---|---|---|---|
| Vegueros de Pinar del Río | 2nd | 2025 | 1 | 10 | 2013–14 |
| Industriales de La Habana | 4th | 2023–24 | 2 | 12 | 2009–10 |
| Avispas de Santiago de Cuba | 5th | 2023–24 | 2 | 8 | 2007–08 |
| Alazanes de Granma | 3rd | 2025 | 1 | 3 | 2020–21 |
| Leñadores de Las Tunas | 1st | 2023–24 | 2 | 4 | 2018–19 |
| Tigres de Ciego de Ávila | 6th | 2025 | 1 | 3 | 2015–16 |

== Champions ==
| Season | Winning team | Manager | Record | Games | Losing team |
|---|---|---|---|---|---|
| 2022–23 | Agricultores (Las Tunas/Granma) | Carlos Martí | 30–19 | 4–3 | Portuarios (Industriales/Mayabeque) |
| 2023–24 | Matanzas | Armando Ferrer | 25–15 | 4–2 | Artemisa |
| 2025 | Ciego de Ávila | Danny Miranda | 24–16 | 4–0 | Las Tunas |
| 2026 | Industriales | Guillermo Carmona | 24–16 | 4–1 | Las Tunas |
