= Yasser Gómez =

Cuban baseball player (born 1980)

Joplin Blasters – No. 5
- Outfielder
- Born: April 1, 1980 (age 46); Havana, Cuba
- Bats: Left Throws: Left
- Stats at Baseball Reference
Medals
Representing Cuba
Men's Baseball
Summer Olympics
Silver medal – second place	2000 Sydney	Team
Baseball World Cup
Gold medal – first place	2001 Taipei	Team
Intercontinental Cup
Silver medal – second place	1999 Sydney	Team
Gold medal – first place	2002 Havana	Team

Yasser Richard Gómez Soto (born April 1, 1980) is a Cuban baseball player. Gómez competed for Cuba in international competition, winning an Olympic silver medal. Gómez defected from Cuba, and signed with the Atlanta Braves organization. He most recently played with the Joplin Blasters of the American Association of Professional Baseball.

== Cuba ==
Gómez played in the Cuban National Series. In the 1997–98 Cuban National Series, playing for the Metropolitanos, Gómez won the Cuban National Series Rookie of the Year Award, as he hit .359 (5th in the league) and set a new rookie record with 112 hits. In the 1998-99 Cuban National Series, Gómez joined the Industriales and set an aluminum-bat era record for triples (12), including three in one game on January 23 in consecutive at-bats against Ciro Licea.

Gómez made his Cuban national team debut in the 1999 Intercontinental Cup, going 0 for 2 as the backup centerfielder to Yobal Duenas. Gómez still made an impact on the Cup in a very negative way. In the 11th inning, he lost a fly ball from Gary White in the sun, giving White the game-winning single as Peter Vogler raced home. In the 1999-2000 Cuban National Series, he hit .333 to tie Antonio Scull for third in the league.

He played for the Cuba national baseball team in the 2000 Summer Olympics. Gómez was the team's main center fielder in the competition, as Cuba won the silver medal. Gómez hit .380/.481/.480 in the 2000-01 Cuban National Series. He was well back of the league leader in hitting in a high-average year as Osmani Urrutia hit .431. The left-hander batted .240/.406/.280 in the 2001 Baseball World Cup, again serving as Cuba's main center fielder. He was 1 for 2 with a run in the gold medal game 5-3 win over Team USA before leaving for a pinch-hitter. During the 2001-2002 season, he batted .365/.430/.496 and was 7th in average. His 3 triples led the 2002 Super Liga.

Gómez played his final games for the national team in the 2002 Intercontinental Cup. He batted .269/.406/.346 with 8 runs in 9 games and was caught stealing in both of his attempts. He was 0 for 3 in the gold medal game; for only the second time in four international tournaments, his Cuban team won Gold. Gomez was never again a member of the national baseball team, and reported he was never given a reason.

Gómez batted .247/.307/.247 in reduced action in the 2002-03 Cuban National Series. He bounced back to .301/.369/.336 in 2003-2004. His 14 runs in the 2004 Super Liga tied Yoandy Garlobo for the lead. He played for the Cuban "B" team in the 2004 Haarlem Baseball Week and went 9 for 19 with 3 walks. In 2004-05, Gómez batted .330/.419/.398. 2005-2006 was a big year in limited time as he hit .403/.481/.484 in 48 games. He was left off of the 2006 World Baseball Classic roster. In 2006-07, Gómez produced at a .330/.438/.388 rate. In the 2007 World Port Tournament, he was 3 for 13 with a walk and a double. Gómez had a strong campaign in the 2007-08 Cuban National Series, hitting .394/.495/.511 to finish a career-high third in average behind Garlobo and Leonys Martín. He led the league with 8 sacrifice flies. He was left off the All-Star team as Alexei Bell, Alfredo Despaigne and Yoandry Urgellés were chosen. He was then excluded from Cuba's roster for the 2008 Olympics.

Gómez was originally slated to play in the 2009 World Baseball Classic, but he and Yadel Martí were kicked off the team in November 2008 and banned from league play in the 2008-09 Cuban National Series for an unspecified reason, believed to be an attempted defection to the United States. Not allowed to play baseball, Gómez and Martí made their plans to defect. Gómez, Martí and Juan Yasser Serrano defected from Cuba in December 2008 in an effort to get to the Dominican Republic to seek a Major League Baseball career. In August 2009, they were declared free agents.

== Atlanta Braves ==
On May 26, 2010, Gómez signed with the Atlanta Braves organization. He signed for $20,000 and was assigned to the Double-A Mississippi Braves. He did not play in 2011.

== 2012 ==
Gómez signed with the McAllen Thunder of the North American League for 2012.

== See also ==
- List of baseball players who defected from Cuba
