= 2026–27 Cuban National Series =

- League: Cuban National Series
- Sport: Baseball
- Duration: October 2026 – December 2026
- Games: 44 games (regular season)
- Teams: 16

Regular season

Seasons
- ← 2025–26

The 2026–27 Cuban National Series is the 65th edition of the Cuban National Series, the primary winter league baseball tournament in Cuba.

== Format ==
The 65th Cuban National Series introduced a new regular season format, dividing the league into two conferences: the Occidental (Western) and Oriental (Eastern) zones. The top four teams in each zone qualify for the postseason, with the champion of each zone advancing to the championship series; no inter-zone games will be played during the regular season (similar to Major League Baseball before the advent of interleague play). The new system was implemented due to the logistical difficulties brought on the ongoing Cuban energy crisis, with the goal of reducing travel.

== Regular season ==
=== Standings ===
As of 19 November 2026

Pos	Team	G	W	L	Pct.	GB	Home	Road
1	Pinar del Río	37	27	10	.730	—	14–6	13–4
2	Matanzas	36	21	15	.583	5.5	11–6	10–9
3	Industriales	36	21	15	.571	5.5	9–8	12–7
4	Cienfuegos	37	21	16	.568	6.0	9–9	12–7
5	Mayabeque	37	19	18	.514	8.0	9–10	10–8
6	Villa Clara	35	18	17	.514	8.0	9–9	9–8
7	Artemisa	38	13	25	.342	14.5	7–11	6–14
8	Isla de la Juventud	36	6	30	.143	20.5	4–15	2–15

Pos	Team	G	W	L	Pct.	GB	Home	Road
1	Las Tunas	38	27	11	.711	—	12–6	15–5
2	Granma	38	22	16	.579	5.0	11–9	11–7
3	Holguín	37	21	16	.568	5.5	12–8	9–8
4	Santiago de Cuba	37	19	18	.514	7.5	9–10	10–8
5	Ciego de Ávila	38	18	20	.474	9.0	8–10	10–10
5	Sancti Spíritus	38	18	20	.474	9.0	9–9	9–11
7	Camagüey	37	14	23	.378	12.5	8–9	6–14
8	Guantánamo	37	11	26	.297	16.5	10–10	1–16

Classified to Playoffs

== League leaders ==
As of 21 November 2026

Hitting leaders
Stat	Player	Team	Total
AVG	Dennis Laza	Mayabeque	.443
HR	2 tied with		14
RBI	Henry Quintero	Las Tunas	48
R	Héctor Castillo	Las Tunas	46
H	2 tied with		60
SO	Lázaro Armenteros	Industriales	31

Pitching leaders
Stat	Player	Team	Total
W	4 tied with		5
L	2 tied with		6
ERA	José Grandales	Sancti Spíritus	1.17
SO	Yoennis Yera	Matanzas	48
IP	Yoan Díaz	Ciego de Ávila	65.1
SV	Fernando Betanzos	Camagüey	6
