= 2023 Cuban National Series =

2023 Cuban National Series Serie Nacional de Béisbol 2023
- League: Cuban National Series
- Sport: Baseball
- Duration: 29 March – 3 July (regular season); 8 July – 11 August (postseason)
- Number of games: 75
- Number of teams: 16

Regular season
- Best record: Las Tunas (45–29)

Postseason
- Finals champions: Las Tunas (2nd title)
- Runners-up: Industriales

SNB seasons
- ← 2022 2024 →

The 2023 Cuban National Series was the 62nd season of the league. No longer playing a winter league schedule, the regular season began on 29 March and ended on 3 July. In the series' final playoff round, contested in August, Las Tunas defeated Industriales in a four-game sweep. It was Las Tunas second league championship, having previously won in 2018–19.

Beginning with the 2023 season, the top six teams in the National Series qualified for the top-level Cuban Elite League.

== Regular season standings ==
Keys

- Qualified for SNB playoffs
- Bold: Qualified for Cuban Elite League

Team	G	W	L	Pct.	GB
**Las Tunas**	74	45	29	.609	–
**Santiago de Cuba**	74	43	31	.582	2
**Artemisa**	75	41	34	.547	4.5
**Sancti Spiritus**	75	41	34	.547	4.5
**Industriales**	75	41	34	.547	4.5
**Matanzas**	75	40	35	.534	5.5
Camagüey	75	39	36	.520	6.5
Ciego de Ávila	75	39	36	.520	6.5
Mayabeque	75	39	36	.520	6.5
Villa Clara	75	37	38	.494	8.5
Holguín	75	36	39	.480	9.5
Granma	74	35	39	.473	10
Isla de la Juventud	75	35	40	.467	10.5
Pinar del Río	74	34	40	.460	11
Cienfuegos	73	27	46	.370	17.5
Guantánamo	73	24	49	.329	20.5

For teams that finished with equal records:

- Artemisa was 3–2 against Sancti Spiritus, and 5–0 against Industriales; Sancti Spiritus was 4–1 against Industriales
- Camagüey was 3–2 against Ciego de Ávila, and 3–2 against Mayabeque; Ciego de Ávila was 3–2 against Mayabeque

== Playoffs ==
The postseason began on July 8, and ended on August 11.

Quarterfinals
1	**Las Tunas**	4
8	Ciego de Ávila	0
3	Artemisa	1
6	**Matanzas**	4
2	**Santiago de Cuba**	4
7	Camagüey	2
4	Sancti Spiritus	3
5	**Industriales**	4

Semifinals
1	**Las Tunas**	4
6	Matanzas	2
2	Santiago de Cuba	3
5	**Industriales**	4

Final
1	**Las Tunas**	4
5	Industriales	0
