= 2023–24 Cuban Elite League =

2023–24 Cuban Elite League Liga Elite del Béisbol Cubano 2023–24
- League: Cuban Elite League
- Sport: Baseball
- Duration: 7 November – 25 December
- Number of games: 40
- Number of teams: 6

Regular season
- Best record: Matanzas (25–15)

Postseason
- Finals champions: Matanzas (1st LEB title)
- Runners-up: Cazadores de Artemisa

LEB seasons
- ← 2022–23 2024–25 →

The 2023–24 Cuban Elite League was the second edition of the tournament. After only one season, the format of the tournament was reorganized completely; this year, the league would include the top six regular-season teams from the 2023 Cuban National Series, rather than the amalgamation of National Series teams that was seen in the 2022–23 campaign.

The tournament began on November 7, and the regular season finished on December 25; the final game of the playoffs was played on January 23 with Matanzas beating Artemisa.

== Participating teams ==
Six clubs competed in the 2023–24 season after qualifying from the Cuban National Series.

Location of the 2023–24 Cuban Elite League teams

| Team | Location | Stadium | Capacity | SNB Position | First season in LEB | No. of seasons of current spell in LEB | Top division titles | Most recent top division title | Ref. |
|---|---|---|---|---|---|---|---|---|---|
| Cocodrilos | Matanzas | Estadio Victoria de Girón | 22,000 | 6th | 2023–24 | 1 | 1 | 2019–20 | |
| Industriales | Havana | Estadio Latinoamericano | 55,000 | 5th | 2023–24 | 1 | 12 | 2009–10 | |
| Avispas | Santiago de Cuba | Estadio Guillermón Moncada | 25,000 | 2nd | 2023–24 | 1 | 8 | 2007–08 | |
| Gallos | Sancti Spíritus | Estadio José Antonio Huelga | 13,000 | 4th | 2023–24 | 1 | 1 | 1978–79 | |
| Leñadores | Las Tunas | Estadio Julio Antonio Mella | 13,000 | 1st | 2023–24 | 1 | 1 | 2018–19 | |
| Cazadores | Artemisa | Estadio 26 de Julio | 6,000 | 3rd | 2023–24 | 1 | 0 | – | |

== Regular season standings ==
| Team | G | W | L | Pct. | GB | Home | Road |
|---|---|---|---|---|---|---|---|
| Matanzas | 40 | 25 | 15 | .625 | - | 16-4 | 19–11 |
| Artemisa | 40 | 21 | 19 | .525 | 4 | 12-8 | 9–11 |
| Industriales | 40 | 21 | 19 | .525 | 4 | 11-9 | 10-10 |
| Las Tunas | 40 | 20 | 20 | .500 | 5 | 11-9 | 9–11 |
| Sancti Spíritus | 40 | 18 | 22 | .450 | 7 | 13-7 | 5–15 |
| Santiago de Cuba | 40 | 15 | 25 | .375 | 10 | 11-9 | 4–16 |

== Playoffs ==
Semifinals
1 | Matanzas | 4
4 | Las Tunas | 2
2 | Artemisa | 4
3 | Industriales | 1

Final
1 | Matanzas | 4
2 | Artemisa | 2

== League leaders ==
Batting leaders
| Stat | Player | Total |
|---|---|---|
| AVG | Alexander Pozo (MTZ) | .380 |
| H | José Luis Gutiérrez (SCU) | 52 |
| R | Juan Carlos Arencibia (SSP) | 32 |
| HR | Yurisbel Gracial (MTZ) | 8 |
| RBI | Rafael Ramón Viñales (LTU) | 35 |

Pitching leaders
| Stat | Player | Total |
|---|---|---|
| ERA | Yosiel Serrano (SCU) | 1.69 |
| W | Reemberto Barreto Grave (IND) | 7 |
| S | Yanielquis Duardo (SSP) | 27 |
| K | Yunieski García (ART) | 49 |
| IP | Yunieski García (ART) | 55.1 |
