= 2025–26 Cuban National Series =

- League: Cuban National Series
- Sport: Baseball
- Duration: September 2025 – January 2026
- Games: 75 games (regular season)
- Teams: 16

Regular season
- Season champions: Leñadores de Las Tunas
- Season MVP: Yasiel González (HOL)

Final Series
- Champions: Cocodrilos de Matanzas (2nd title)
- Runners-up: Leñadores de Las Tunas

Seasons
- ← 2024 2026–27 →

The 2025–26 Cuban National Series is the 64th edition of the Cuban National Series, the primary baseball tournament in Cuba. The regular season started on September 2, 2025, and will run to December 17, 2025. Playoffs are scheduled to begin on January 4th, 2026, with the final series is expected to begin on January 23rd, 2026.

Leñadores de Las Tunas are the defending champions, having won their third championship in the 2024 season.

The tournament opened more than a year after the conclusion of the 2024 season. The champion of the National Series is expected to represent Cuba at the 2026 Baseball Champions League Americas.

== Competition format ==
The tournament will consist of 75 games in the regular season, from which eight teams will qualify for the postseason. Semifinals and final will take place after the new years break.

== Regular season ==
=== Standings ===
As of 19 January 2026

Pos	Team	G	W	L	Pct.	GB	Home	Road
1	Las Tunas	74	48	26	.649	—	22–15	26–11
2	Matanzas	75	46	29	.613	2.5	22–15	24–14
2	Holguín	75	46	29	.613	2.5	21–16	25–13
4	Mayabeque	75	44	31	.587	4.5	21–17	23–14
5	Industriales	75	43	32	.573	5.5	15–22	28–10
6	Artemisa	74	42	32	.568	6.0	20–17	22–15
7	Sancti Spíritus	75	42	33	.560	6.5	23–14	19–19
8	Villa Clara	75	40	35	.533	8.5	22–16	18–19
8	Pinar del Río	75	40	35	.533	8.5	21–17	19–18
10	Cienfuegos	75	39	36	.520	9.5	19–19	20–17
11	Santiago de Cuba	72	35	37	.486	12.0	17–19	18–18
12	Granma	73	30	43	.411	17.5	13–23	17–20
13	Camagüey	75	30	45	.400	18.5	14–23	16–22
14	Ciego de Ávila	73	28	45	.384	19.5	16–21	12–24
15	Isla de la Juventud	74	23	51	.311	25.0	12–25	11–26
16	Guantánamo	73	18	55	.247	29.5	12–25	6–30

Classified to Playoffs

== League leaders ==
As of 19 January 2026

Hitting leaders
Stat	Player	Team	Total
AVG	Yasiel González	Holguín	.409
HR	Yasiel González	Holguín	16
RBI	Ángel Hechavarría	Industriales	74
R	Ariel Sánchez	Industriales	70
H	Ariel Sánchez	Industriales	105
SO	Erick Acevedo	Cienfuegos	51

Pitching leaders
Stat	Player	Team	Total
W	Yosmel Garcés	Las Tunas	11
L	Sair Sánchez	Isla de la Juventud	12
ERA	Keniel Ferráz	Las Tunas	1.85
ERA	Randy Cueto	Villa Clara	1.85
SO	Brander Guevara	Artemisa	100
IP	Sair Sánchez	Isla de la Juventud	98.2
SV	José Ángel García	Artemisa	11
