= José Julio Ruiz =

Cuban baseball player

Free agent
- First baseman
- Born: March 24, 1985 (age 40); Santiago de Cuba, Cuba
- Bats: Left Throws: Left

José Julio Ruiz Barzán (born March 24, 1985) is a Cuban professional baseball player who is a free agent. After playing in the Cuban National Series for Santiago de Cuba from 2003 through 2009 and for the Cuba national baseball team in international tournaments, Ruiz defected from Cuba to play baseball in the United States.

== Career ==
Ruiz debuted with Santiago de Cuba in the 2003-04 Serie Nacional, going 6 for 26 with a walk; he also pitched 1 1/3 innings, allowing four runs. He did not play in 2004-05. In 2005-06, he hit .357/.428/.473 but only homered twice in 241 AB despite manning a power position. He was 7th in the league in average.

Ruiz batted .323/.430/.455 in 2006-07 and led the Serie Nacional with 72 RBI. He was with Cuba for the 2007 World Port Tournament and put on a fine show, hitting .290/.405/.742. He was second in the tourney in slugging (behind Alfredo Despaigne), led in home runs (4, winning the World Port Tournament Home Run King award), tied Jordan Danks for second in runs (8, behind Hector Olivera Jr.), tied Roger Kieschnick for 4th in RBI (6), tied for second in doubles (2), second to Despaigne in total bases (23) and tied for 4th in walks (4).

Ruiz had another fine campaign in 2007-08 batting .341/.423/.492. He was third in the Serie Nacional with 83 runs, led with 126 hits, was 10th with 69 RBI (only 4th on his own team one year after leading the circuit), 8th with 182 total bases and led with 32 stolen bases (caught stealing 9 times).

Ruiz was hitting .305/.408/.467 after 52 games in 2008-09 with no steals after his speedy 2007-08 campaign. He then vanished from Cuban boxscores and was rumored to have defected to the Dominican Republic. The defection was confirmed in July, when Ruiz appeared in Miami, FL to announce his intention to try to make the majors.

Ruiz signed a one-year deal with the Tampa Bay Rays and made his US debut in 2010. When the Rays failed to re-sign him immediately after his contract expired, the Texas Rangers took him and invited him to spring training for the 2011 season.

After playing part of the 2019 season with the Southern Maryland Blue Crabs, Ruiz was released on July 2, 2019.

== See also ==
- List of baseball players who defected from Cuba
