= Armando Ferrer =

Cuban baseball manager

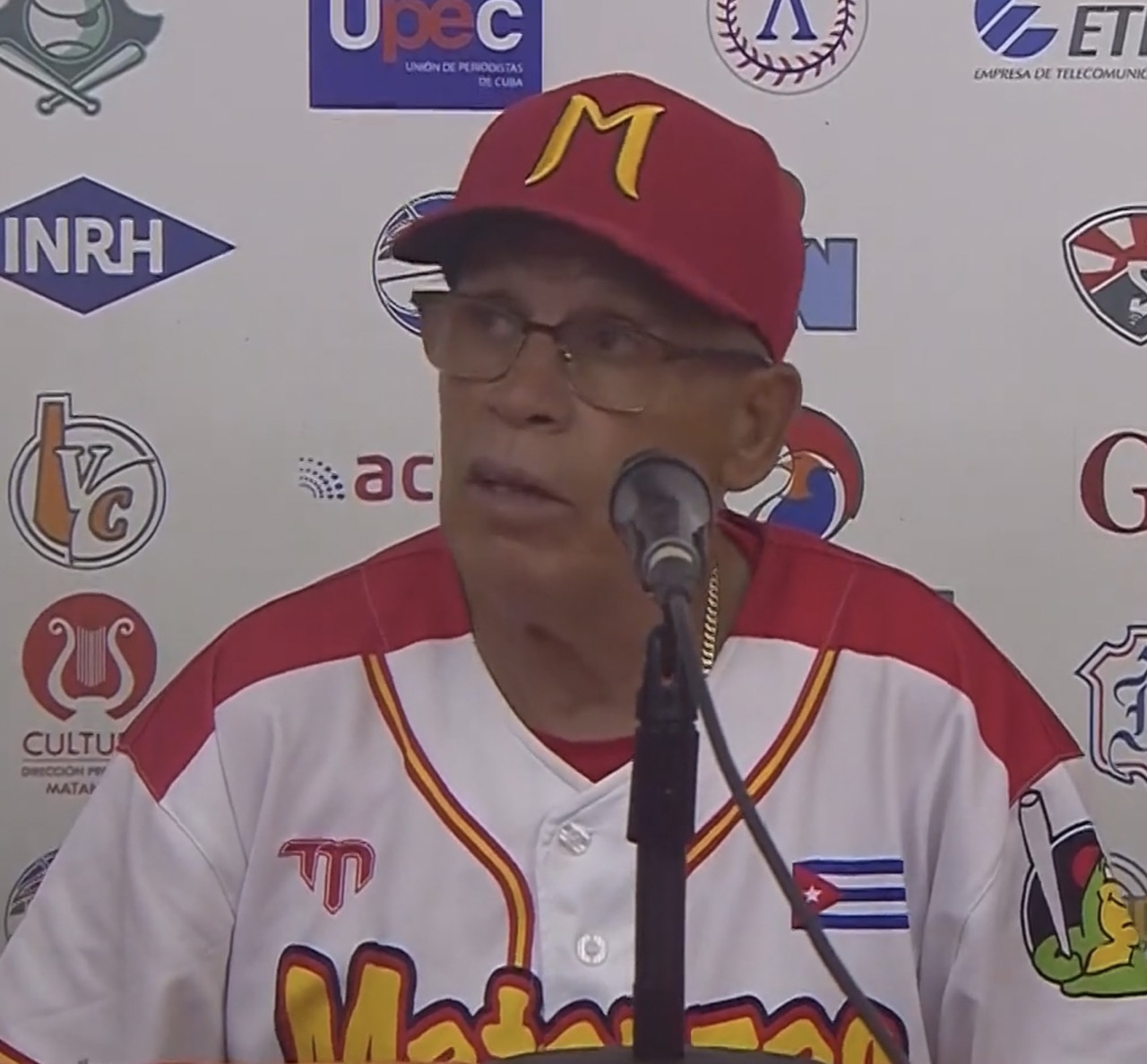

Cocodrilos de Matanzas – No. 9
- Manager
- Born: October 15, 1953 (age 72) (Note: Date listed by Baseball Reference. Various sources alternatively offer 1954.); Perico, Matanzas, Cuba

Jesús Armando Ferrer Ruz is a Cuban baseball manager for Matanzas of the Cuban National Series (SNB). He previously managed the Cuba national baseball team.

Ferrer was born and raised in a sugar mill community in Perico, Matanzas. He served as the first base coach for the Henequeneros, managed by Gerardo "Sile" Junco, who won two National Series titles in 1990 and 1991. He debuted as coach of Matanzas in the 2019–20 Cuban National Series, leading the team to its first SNB championship. Ferrer also led Matanzas to a championship in the 2023–24 Cuban Elite League; that season, he made an effort to include players with experience in professional leagues outside of Cuba.

He coached Cuba to a title at the 2005 U-15 Baseball World Cup in Mexico, and managed the senior national team at the 2009 ALBA Games, held in Havana. He was named manager of Cuba at the qualifiers for the 2020 Summer Olympics (held in Tokyo in 2021). However, Cuba did not advance out of the qualifiers, held in Port St. Lucie and West Palm Beach, Florida, marking the first time the country did not qualify for the Olympic Games; Ferrer was fired after the tournament.
