= 1990–91 Cuban National Series =

Baseball season in Cuba

1990–91 Cuban National Series Serie Nacional de Béisbol 1990–91
- League: Cuban National Series
- Sport: Baseball
- Games: 48
- Teams: 18

Eastern zone
- Best record: Santiago de Cuba (33–15)

Western zone
- Best record: La Habana (34–13)

Postseason
- Finals champions: Henequeneros
- Runners-up: Camagüey

SNB seasons
- ← 1989–90 1991–92 →

The 30th season of the Cuban National Series featured a postseason bracket tournament for the first time, with the top two teams from each division qualifying. Semifinals were played as best-of-three series, followed by a best-of-seven final series. Both semifinals were won by division runners-up, with Henequeros then defeating Camagüey to repeat as league champions. The 18 teams of the league were unchanged from recent seasons, as was each team's regular-season schedule of 48 games.

== Standings ==
=== Western zone ===
Team	W	L	Pct.	GB
La Habana	34	13	.723	-
Henequeneros (Matanzas)	33	15	.600	1.5
Vegueros (Pinar del Río)	33	15	.600	1.5
Industriales (Havana)	29	19	.604	5.5
Metropolitanos (Havana)	24	23	.510	10
Isla de la Juventud	20	28	.416	14.5
Cienfuegos	16	32	.333	18.5
Citricultores (Matanzas)	13	35	.270	21.5
Forestales (Pinar del Río)	13	35	.270	21.5

=== Eastern zone ===
Team	W	L	Pct.	GB
Santiago de Cuba	33	15	.688	-
Camagüey	29	19	.604	4
Villa Clara	27	21	.500	6
Holguín	26	22	.541	7
Las Tunas	24	24	.500	9
Granma	22	26	.458	11
Guantánamo	21	27	.400	12
Ciego de Ávila	20	28	.416	13
Sancti Spíritus	14	34	.291	19

== Playoffs ==
Semifinals
W1	La Habana	1
E2	Camagüey	2
E1	Santiago de Cuba	0
W2	Henequeneros	2

Finals
E2	Camagüey	1
W2	Henequeneros	4
