= 2016–17 Cuban National Series =

2016–17 Cuban National Series Serie Nacional de Béisbol 2016–17
- League: Cuban National Series
- Sport: Baseball
- Duration: 7 August – 14 October; 1 November – 28 December
- Games: 90
- Teams: 16

Regular season
- Best record: Matanzas (70–20)

Postseason
- Finals champions: Granma (1st title)
- Runners-up: Ciego de Ávila

SNB seasons
- ← 2015–16 2017–18 →

The 2016–17 Cuban National Series was the 56th season of the league. Granma defeated Ciego de Ávila in the series' final round, in a four-game sweep.

This season marked a few format changes for the Cuban National Series. The number of teams in the second phase was lowered to six from eight. The schedule was changed to align with other Caribbean baseball leagues, which allowed for the champion from the current year to compete in the Caribbean Series. The shift in schedule also removed all overlap with the Nippon Professional Baseball (NPB) season, allowing players to play full seasons in both leagues.
