= 1988–89 Cuban National Series =

Baseball season in Cuba

1988–89 Cuban National Series Serie Nacional de Béisbol 1988–89
- League: Cuban National Series
- Sport: Baseball
- Games: 48
- Teams: 18

Eastern zone
- Best record: Granma, Santiago de Cuba, and Camagüey (29–19)

Western zone
- Best record: Industriales (38–10)

Postseason

Round-robin tournament
- Champions: Santiago de Cuba (5–1)
- Runners-up: Industriales (4–2)

SNB seasons
- ← 1987–88 1989–90 →

The 28th season of the Cuban National Series saw a three-way tie atop the Eastern division, with Granma and Santiago de Cuba advancing to the postseason, along with Industriales and Henequeneros from the Western division. The ensuing round-robin tournament was won by Santiago de Cuba, who won five of their six games. This was the final season with the postseason structured as a round-robin tournament. The 18 teams of the league, each with a 48-game regular-season schedule, was unchanged from recent seasons.

== Standings ==
=== Western zone ===
Team	W	L	Pct.	GB
Industriales (Havana)	38	10	.791	-
Henequeneros (Matanzas)	36	12	.750	2
La Habana	31	16	.659	6.5
Vegueros (Pinar del Río)	31	17	.645	7
Metropolitanos (Havana)	25	22	.531	12.5
Cienfuegos	18	29	.382	19.5
Isla de la Juventud	14	34	.291	24
Forestales (Pinar del Río)	12	36	.250	26
Citricultores (Matanzas)	9	38	.191	28.5

=== Eastern zone ===
Team	W	L	Pct.	GB
Santiago de Cuba	29	19	.604	-
Granma	29	19	.604	-
Camagüey	29	19	.604	-
Villa Clara	26	22	.541	3
Ciego de Ávila	26	22	.541	3
Guantánamo	25	23	.520	4
Sancti Spíritus	20	28	.416	9
Las Tunas	19	29	.395	10
Holguín	13	35	.270	16

== Postseason ==
Team	W	L	Pct.	GB
Santiago de Cuba	5	1	.833	-
Industriales	4	2	.667	1
Granma	2	4	.333	3
Henequeneros	1	5	.167	4
