= 2006–07 Cuban National Series =

The 46th season of the Cuban National Series saw perennial powers Industriales and Santiago de Cuba meet in the playoff final, where the Avispas won the title, 4-2.

Pinar del Río and Santiago had the best regular season records, but the Vegueros were upset by La Habana in the first round of the playoffs.

== Regular season standings ==
=== West ===
Group A
Team	W	L	PCT.	GB
Pinar del Río	56	34	.622	-
Isla de la Juventud	43	47	.478	13
Metropolitanos	29	61	.322	27
Matanzas	26	64	.289	30

Group B
Team	W	L	PCT.	GB
Industriales	53	36	.596	-
Sancti Spíritus	51	38	.573	2
Havana Province	46	44	.511	7½
Cienfuegos	42	48	.473	11½

=== East ===
Group C
Team	W	L	PCT.	GB
Villa Clara	52	38	.578	-
Las Tunas	50	40	.556	2
Camagüey	50	40	.556	2
Ciego de Ávila	48	42	.533	4

Group D
Team	W	L	PCT.	GB
Santiago de Cuba	58	32	.640	-
Granma	45	45	.500	12½
Holguín	39	50	.438	18
Guantánamo	31	59	.344	26½

== Playoffs ==
Quarterfinals
A1	Pinar del Río	2
B3	Havana Province	3
West
B1	Industriales	3
B2	Sancti Spíritus	1
C1	Villa Clara	3
C2	Las Tunas	2
East
D1	Santiago de Cuba	3
C3	Camagüey	1

Semifinals
B3	Havana Province	0
B1	Industriales	4
C1	Villa Clara	3
D1	Santiago de Cuba	4

Final
B1	Industriales	2
D1	Santiago de Cuba	4

== Statistical leaders ==
Hitting
Batting average	Osmani Urrutia	Las Tunas	.371
Hits	Jorge Padrón	Pinar del Río	131
Doubles	Yulieski Gourriel	Sancti Spíritus	28
Triples	Andrés Quiala	Las Tunas	8
Home runs	Alexei Ramírez	Pinar del Río	20
Runs	Yohennis Céspedes	Granma	79
Slugging average	Juan Linares	La Habana	.586
Runs batted in	Jose Ruiz	Santiago de Cuba	72

Pitching
Earned run average	Ciro Licea	Granma	1.15
Winning percentage	Elier Sánchez	Camagüey	.813 (13-3)
Wins	Elier Sánchez; Pedro Luis Lazo	Camagüey; Pinar del Río	13
Complete games	Ciro Licea; Jonder Martínez; Norge Luis Vera	Granma; Havana Province; Santiago de Cuba	4
