= 1999–2000 Cuban National Series =

The 39th Cuban National Series was marked by Santiago de Cuba's remarkable postseason run to win its second straight National Series. Under the direction of manager Higinio Vélez, the Avispas won eleven straight games in the playoffs, sweeping Camagüey, Granma and finally Pinar del Río.

== Standings ==
=== Group A ===
| Team | W | L | Pct. | GB |
|---|---|---|---|---|
| Pinar del Río | 59 | 31 | .655 | - |
| Metropolitanos | 46 | 44 | .511 | 13 |
| Isla de la Juventud | 42 | 48 | .466 | 17 |
| Matanzas | 39 | 51 | .433 | 20 |

=== Group B ===
| Team | W | L | Pct. | GB |
|---|---|---|---|---|
| Industriales | 57 | 33 | .633 | - |
| Sancti Spíritus | 39 | 51 | .433 | 18 |
| La Habana | 35 | 55 | .388 | 22 |
| Cienfuegos | 34 | 56 | .377 | 23 |

=== Group C ===
| Team | W | L | Pct. | GB |
|---|---|---|---|---|
| Villa Clara | 53 | 37 | .588 | - |
| Camagüey | 52 | 38 | .577 | 1 |
| Ciego de Ávila | 46 | 44 | .511 | 7 |
| Las Tunas | 32 | 58 | .355 | 21 |

=== Group D ===
| Team | W | L | Pct. | GB |
|---|---|---|---|---|
| Santiago de Cuba | 62 | 28 | .688 | - |
| Granma | 53 | 37 | .588 | 9 |
| Holguín | 40 | 50 | .444 | 22 |
| Guantánamo | 31 | 59 | .344 | 31 |

== Playoffs ==
Quarterfinals
A1 | Pinar del Río | 3
A3 | Isla de la Juventud | 1
West
B1 | Industriales | 3
A2 | Metropolitanos | 2
D1 | Santiago de Cuba | 3
C2 | Camagüey | 0
East
C1 | Villa Clara | 0
D2 | Granma | 3

Semifinals
A1 | Pinar del Río | 4
B1 | Industriales | 3
D1 | Santiago de Cuba | 4
D2 | Granma | 0

Finals
A1 | Pinar del Río | 0
D1 | Santiago de Cuba | 4
