= 2000–01 Cuban National Series =

Santiago de Cuba won its third straight Cuban National Series crown, under manager Higinio Vélez.

== Standings ==
=== Group A ===
| Team | W | L | Pct. | GB |
|---|---|---|---|---|
| Pinar del Río | 59 | 31 | .655 | - |
| Isla de la Juventud | 53 | 37 | .588 | 6 |
| Metropolitanos | 40 | 50 | .444 | 19 |
| Matanzas | 36 | 54 | .400 | 23 |

=== Group B ===
| Team | W | L | Pct. | GB |
|---|---|---|---|---|
| La Habana | 50 | 40 | .555 | - |
| Industriales | 50 | 40 | .555 | - |
| Sancti Spíritus | 38 | 52 | .422 | 12 |
| Cienfuegos | 28 | 62 | .311 | 22 |

=== Group C ===
| Team | W | L | Pct. | GB |
|---|---|---|---|---|
| Villa Clara | 59 | 31 | .655 | - |
| Camagüey | 53 | 37 | .588 | 6 |
| Ciego de Ávila | 35 | 55 | .388 | 24 |
| Las Tunas | 25 | 65 | .277 | 34 |

=== Group D ===
| Team | W | L | Pct. | GB |
|---|---|---|---|---|
| Santiago de Cuba | 55 | 35 | .611 | - |
| Granma | 55 | 35 | .611 | - |
| Guantánamo | 43 | 47 | .477 | 12 |
| Holguín | 41 | 49 | .455 | 14 |

== Playoffs ==
Quarterfinals
A1 | Pinar del Río | 3
B2 | Industriales | 2
West
A2 | Isla de la Juventud | 1
B1 | Habana | 3
C1 | Villa Clara | 1
C2 | Camagüey | 3
East
D1 | Santiago de Cuba | 3
D2 | Granma | 1

Semifinals
A1 | Pinar del Río | 4
B1 | Habana | 0
C2 | Camagüey | 2
D1 | Santiago de Cuba | 4

Finals
A1 | Pinar del Río | 1
D1 | Santiago de Cuba | 4
