= 1979–80 Cuban National Series =

Baseball season in Cuba

1979–80 Cuban National Series Serie Nacional de Béisbol 1979–80
- League: Cuban National Series
- Sport: Baseball
- Games: 51
- Teams: 18

Regular season
- Champion: Santiago de Cuba (35–16)

SNB seasons
- ← 1978–79 1980–81 →

In the 19th season of the Cuban National Series, Santiago de Cuba won its first title, edging Villa Clara, Forestales, and Vegueros, each of which finished within two games of the champion. The league's 18 teams and 51-game schedule remained unchanged from the prior season.

== Standings ==
| Team | W | L | Pct. | GB |
|---|---|---|---|---|
| Santiago de Cuba | 35 | 16 | .686 | - |
| Villa Clara | 34 | 17 | .666 | 1 |
| Forestales (Pinar del Río) | 33 | 18 | .647 | 2 |
| Vegueros (Pinar del Río) | 33 | 18 | .647 | 2 |
| Industriales (Havana) | 31 | 20 | .607 | 4 |
| Sancti Spíritus | 31 | 20 | .607 | 4 |
| Metropolitanos (Havana) | 30 | 20 | .600 | 4½ |
| Holguín | 28 | 21 | .571 | 6 |
| Henequeneros (Matanzas) | 28 | 21 | .571 | 6 |
| Citricultores (Matanzas) | 25 | 24 | .510 | 9 |
| Cienfuegos | 26 | 25 | .509 | 9 |
| Granma | 22 | 29 | .431 | 13 |
| Camagüey | 21 | 30 | .411 | 14 |
| Guantánamo | 18 | 33 | .352 | 17 |
| Ciego de Ávila | 18 | 33 | .352 | 17 |
| La Habana | 17 | 32 | .346 | 17 |
| Las Tunas | 12 | 38 | .240 | 22½ |
| Isla de la Juventud | 12 | 39 | .235 | 23 |
