= 2017–18 Cuban National Series =

2017–18 Cuban National Series Serie Nacional de Béisbol 2017–18
- League: Cuban National Series
- Sport: Baseball
- Duration: 5 August – 17 October; 26 October – 25 December
- Number of games: 90
- Number of teams: 16

Regular season
- Best record: Matanzas (61–29)

Postseason
- Finals champions: Granma (2nd title)
- Runners-up: Las Tunas

SNB seasons
- ← 2016–17 2018–19 →

The 2017–18 Cuban National Series was the 57th season of the league. Granma defeated Las Tunas in the series' final round to repeat as champions.
