= Juan Serrano =

Juan Serrano may refer to:

- Juan Pablo Serrano (born 1994), Argentine cyclist
- Juan René Serrano (born 1984), Mexican archer who competed in the 2004 Summer Olympics
- Juan Serrano (flamenco) (born 1935), Spanish flamenco guitarist
- João Serrão (died 1521), Spanish navigator who sailed with Ferdinand Magellan during the first circumnavigation of the world (1519–1521)
- Juan Yasser Serrano (born 1988), Cuban right-handed pitcher
