= José Ruiz =

José Ruiz may refer to:

== Artists and entertainers ==
- José Ruiz y Blasco (1838–1913), Spanish painter, father of Pablo Picasso
- José Martínez Ruiz (1873–1967), Spanish writer and literary critic
- José Carlos Ruiz (born 1936), Mexican film actor

== Crime ==
- Jose Ruiz (Chepe), American man accused in the 1942 death of José Gallardo Díaz

== Politicians ==
- José Francisco Ruiz (1783–1840), Texas revolutionary and politician
- José Ruiz, Cuban plantation owner, defendant in the Amistad Case

== Sportspeople ==
- José Ruiz (footballer, 1904–1962), Mexican football forward
- José Luis Ruiz (born 1952), Spanish long-distance runner
- José Ruíz Matos (1966–1992), Puerto Rican boxer
- José Oliver Ruiz (born 1974), Colombian weightlifter
- José Manuel Ruiz Reyes (born 1978), Spanish table tennis player
- José Ruiz (sailor) (born 1980), sailor
- José Hiber Ruiz (born 1980), Mexican football midfielder
- José Ruiz (futsal player) (born 1983), Spanish futsal player
- José Julio Ruiz (born 1985), Cuban baseball player
- José Ruiz (baseball) (born 1994), Venezuelan baseball player
- José Ruiz, French head coach of the Mali national basketball team
