= 2015–16 Cuban National Series =

2015–16 Cuban National Series Serie Nacional de Béisbol 2015–16
- League: Cuban National Series
- Sport: Baseball
- Duration: 30 August – 6 December; 15 December – 9 March
- Number of games: 86 ± 1
- Number of teams: 16

Regular season
- Best record: Matanzas (55–30)

Postseason
- Finals champions: Ciego de Ávila (3rd title)
- Runners-up: Pinar del Río

SNB seasons
- ← 2014–15 2016–17 →

The 2015–16 Cuban National Series was the 55th season of the league. Ciego de Ávila defeated Pinar del Río in the series' final round. This was the first time a reigning champion had retained their title in eight seasons.
