= Les Anderson =

Les Anderson may refer to:

- Les Anderson (racing driver) (1910–1949), American racecar driver
- Les Anderson (fisher) (died 2003), American record-holding salmon fisher
- Les Anderson, the main character of the 1988 American movie License to Drive

== See also ==
- Leslie Anderson (born 1982), Cuban baseball player
- Leslie Anderson (cricketer) (1891–1979), New Zealand cricketer
