= Yasiel González =

Cuban baseball player (born 1997)

Xiamen Dolphins – No. 51
- Outfielder
- Born: November 20, 1997 (age 28); Gibara, Holguín, Cuba
- Bats: Right Throws: Right

Yasiel Andy González García (born December 20, 1997) is a Cuban professional baseball player who plays as an outfielder for the Xiamen Dolphins of Chinese Professional Baseball. He also plays for the Sabuesos de Holguín of the Cuban National Series, and for the Cuba national baseball team.

González left Holguín partway through the 2023 season and later sought to gain a Major League Baseball contract from the Dominican Republic. He returned to Cuba in 2024 and was appproved to continue playing in the National Series.

González led the 2025–26 Cuban National Series in batting average and in home runs, and was named the league's Most Valuable Player. He was named to the national team roster slated to play an exhibition series in Nicaragua, but was controversially excluded from the roster ahead of the 2026 World Baseball Classic. He played with Cuba at the 2026 Serie de las Américas, where he was named to the all-star team. He was again named MVP of the 2026 Cuban Elite League.

In August 2026, González signed a professional contract (rare for Cuban players active on the island) with the Xiamen Dolphins of Chinese Professional Baseball, one of several Cuban players to do so.
