= Rolando Merino =

Rolando Merino may refer to:

- Rolando Merino Reyes (1898–1957), Chilean politician
- Rolando Meriño (born 1971), Cuban basketball player
