= 1998–99 Cuban National Series =

The 38th Cuban National Series saw Santiago de Cuba, which qualified for the playoffs, win three close series to take its first title in ten years.

== Standings ==
=== Group A ===
Team	W	L	Pct.	GB
Pinar del Río	53	37	.588	-
Isla de la Juventud	52	38	.577	1
Matanzas	40	50	.444	13
Metropolitanos	34	56	.377	19

=== Group B ===
Team	W	L	Pct.	GB
Industriales	58	32	.644	-
La Habana	51	39	.566	7
Cienfuegos	42	48	.466	16
Sancti Spíritus	33	57	.366	25

=== Group C ===
Team	W	L	Pct.	GB
Villa Clara	51	39	.566	-
Ciego de Ávila	41	49	.455	10
Camagüey	40	50	.444	11
Las Tunas	30	60	.333	21

=== Group D ===
Team	W	L	Pct.	GB
Granma	56	34	.622	-
Guantánamo	50	40	.555	6
Santiago de Cuba	46	44	.511	10
Holguín	43	47	.477	13

== Playoffs ==
Quarterfinals
A1	Pinar del Río	2
A2	Isla de la Juventud	3
West
B1	Industriales	3
B2	La Habana	0
D1	Granma	2
D3	Santiago de Cuba	3
East
C1	Villa Clara	1
D2	Guantánamo	3

Semifinals
A2	Isla de la Juventud	3
B1	Industriales	4
D3	Santiago de Cuba	4
D2	Guantánamo	2

Finals
B1	Industriales	3
D3	Santiago de Cuba	4
