= Mark Romanczuk =

Medal record

Men's baseball

Representing United States

World University Baseball Championship
Gold medal – first place	2004 Tainan City	National team

Pan American Games
Silver medal – second place	2003 Santo Domingo	National team

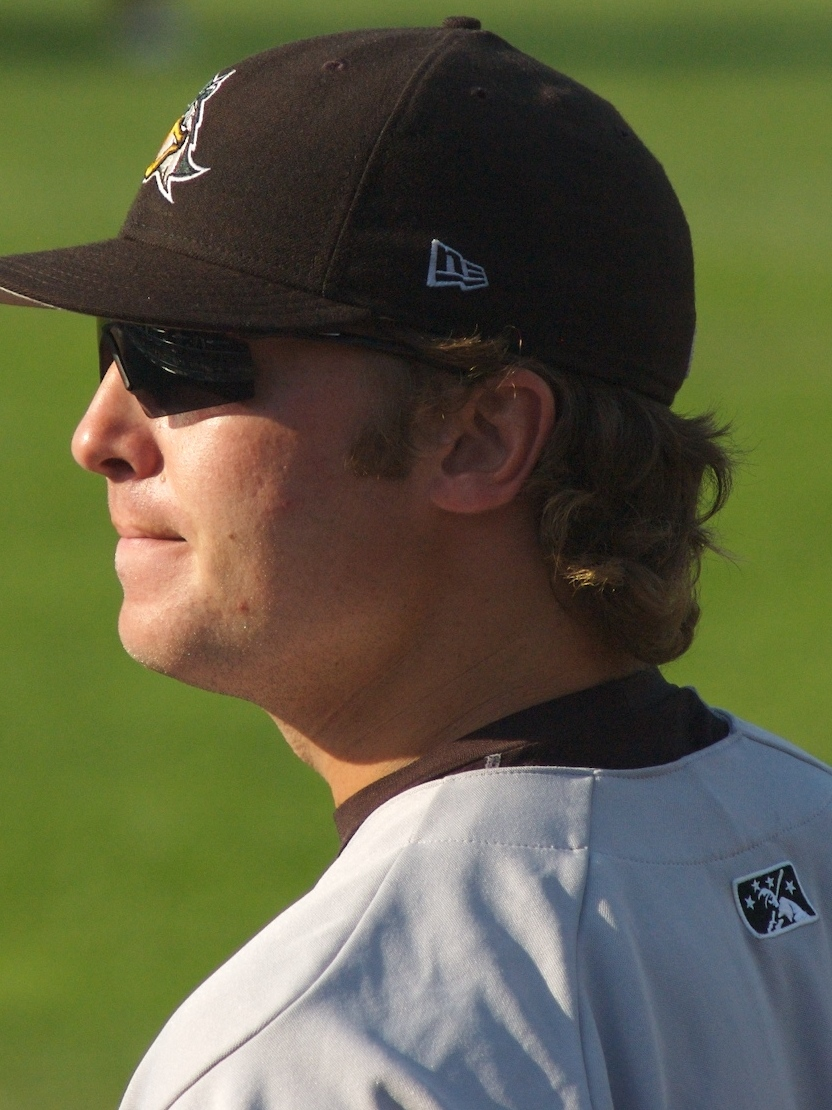
Romanczuk in 2007

Mark J. Romanczuk represented the United States in numerous international baseball tournaments.

He was born September 24, 1983, in Philadelphia, Pennsylvania.

He won a silver medal for the nation's national team in the 2003 Pan American Games. In the 2004 World University Baseball Championship, he won a gold medal.

Romanczuk also won the Louisville Slugger Freshman of the Year award in 2003, alongside pitcher Glen Perkins, catcher Jeff Clement and pitcher Stephen Head, while a pitcher at Stanford University. He played four seasons professionally after being drafted by the Arizona Diamondbacks in the 4th round of the 2005 Major League Baseball draft. He was 12–17 with a 5.14 ERA in 71 pro games.

In 2016 he was inducted into the Delaware Sports Hall of Fame.
