= Cuban baseball league system =

- Country: Cuba
- Sport: Baseball
- Promotion and relegation: Yes (Note: The top six teams from the Cuban National Series (SNB) are effectively promoted to the top-level Cuban Elite League (LEB). However, there is no "relegation" in the traditional sense, as all 16 teams start in the SNB regardless of their finish in the previous LEB.)

National system
- Federation: Baseball Federation of Cuba
- Confederation: WBSC Americas
- Top division: Cuban Elite League
- Second division: Cuban National Series

The Cuban baseball league system is not a single baseball league; rather it is a structure of leagues and series that are governed by the Baseball Federation of Cuba and culminate in national championships and the selection of the Cuba national baseball team.

In the Cuban National Series, players play for the provinces in which they reside, with each province in Cuba (plus Havana) represented by a team. Starting in 2023, the top six teams from the National Series qualify for the top-level winter Cuban Elite League.

== Organization of Cuban national baseball system ==
=== Cuban Elite League ===
Created in 2022, the Elite League (Spanish: Liga Elite de Beisbol, or LEB) took over the former winter schedule that had been dominated by the National Series since its foundation season. It initially ran from October to February with a similar schedule and format as the SNB formerly had, with the winner of the championship series after the postseason playoffs assuming the role as Cuban representative to the Caribbean Series; starting in 2025, it was moved to a spring-summer schedule.

Beginning with the 2023-24 LEB season, the top six teams of the Cuban National Series now directly qualify for the regular season of the Elite League; those teams may draft players from the lower twelve CNS teams. Previously, the Cuban National Series employing relegation of the lower eight teams halfway through the season.

The Elite League has its roots in previous competitions that supplemented the main National Series: the Selective Series (1975–1995) and the Copa Revolución (1996–97). The Selective Series was established in 1975 with the goal of selecting players for the Cuban national team; in the Selective Series, like in the Elite League, rosters of the main National Series teams were whittled down into seven squads that would play an additional 54 games.

=== Cuban National Series ===
The National Series (Spanish: Serie Nacional de Beisbol, or SNB) generally runs from September to January (beginning with the 2024–25 season) with a schedule of a minimum 98 games per team in the regular season. The series is then followed by three playoff rounds culminating in a championship. This series was originally played each winter since 1961-62 until the 2020–21 season, before being moved to the spring in 2022. There are 16 teams organized in a West League and an East League. The top four teams from each league advance to a playoff, with the winner crowned in the championship series. Two teams have dominated the National Series in recent years: Industriales and Santiago de Cuba. From 2014 to 2019, the SNB champion team advanced directly to the Caribbean Series proper, since 2025, the winning team is thus qualified for the Serie de las Americas.

=== Super Series/CNS 23Us ===
For many years the Cuban Super Series, a summer league, usually played from May through July with a schedule of about 28 games. The series is followed by a playoff between the two top teams. Its teams are selected from the best players of the National Series. In turn, the Cuba national baseball team was traditionally selected from the players in the Super Series. Five regional teams competed:

- Occidentales (Western region)
- Centrales (Central region)
- Orientales (Eastern region)
- The champion and runner up teams of the CNS

In 2015 the Super Series was replaced by the 23U National Series on the behest of the BFC, but with a June to September season following the CEL season and with nearly the same teams as the National Series. As it name suggests, its rosters are made up of players aged below 23 and it serves as the minor league division of the National Series.

== History of the Cuban baseball league system ==
Prior to the Cuban Revolution, various professional, semiprofessional, industrial, and amateur baseball leagues and teams flourished in Cuba, including the professional Cuban League and the minor league Havana Sugar Kings.

Since the Cuban Revolution, baseball continued to thrive as Cuba's national game. In February 1961 the government created the National Institute for Sports, Physical Education, and Recreation (INDER) and in March, after the close of the 1960–61 Cuban League season, it decreed the abolition of professional baseball and plans to hold a national amateur championship. Thus, the National Series was conceptualized to serve as the national league circuit. Opening Day for the new league was slated for fall 1961.

The first National Series season 1961–62, included four charter teams: Occidentales, Orientales, Habana, and Azucareros. The next season the number of teams had increased to six, and in 1967 to 12. The expansion of baseball to the provinces was accompanied by the construction of new stadiums in provincial capitals, bringing first-tier baseball to the provincial population. This expansion greatly enhanced the nationwide accessibility of top-flight baseball. The two new Havana-based teams, Industriales and Habana (renamed in the 1970s to Metropolitanos), were similar to the old professional Cuban League rivals, Almendares and Habana in that Industriales, like Almendares, wore blue, while Habana/Metropolitanos, like Habana, wore red. However, after Industriales went on to capture four consecutive championships from 1963 to 1966, they became known as the premier Cuban team. Metropolitanos after the '80s, on the other hand, was unable to be competitive and has failed to re-establish the rivalry; it is now considered a second-class team, where young players and fading veterans share playing time.

Several individuals were important in the transition to post-revolutionary baseball. Gilberto Torres managed the early national team and conveyed his vast knowledge of the game to the new generation of amateur players. Natilla Jiménez managed several provincial teams and was pitching coach of the national team. Juan Vistuer, Asdrúbal Baró, and Pedro Chávez also were prominent transitional coaches and managers. Conrado Marrero (former pitcher with the Washington Senators) remained in Cuba where he was a pitching coach for several teams.

The Cuban baseball system is designed as much to develop the nation's athletic talents as to provide entertainment to the public. Children showing athletic promise are sent to sports academies for extensive competitive training and development, with the goal of developing the nation's athletes. Some players are able to make the municipal team and advance through the sport without training in the academies, but those players are exceptional. Although players are amateurs, elite players are subsidized and given special rewards. A problem confronting Cuba's top athletes, however, is the lack of opportunities to compete against the best players in the world.

An opportunity for competition against the world's best professional players was finally made available by the World Baseball Classic first held in March 2006. In 2014, representation in the Caribbean Series, last made in 1960, was finally restored.

Some other memorable events in the history of the Cuban national baseball system are the following:

- On 16 January and 25 January 1966, right-hander Aquino Abreu pitched back-to-back no-hitters (against Occidentals and Industriales), matching a feat accomplished by major-leaguer Johnny Vander Meer.
- On 13 August 1966 José Ramón López established an all-time season record of 309 strikeouts. Although López struck out 12 batters, he lost the game 2–0.
- On 12 April 1980, two players from the same team, Rey Vicente Anglada and Jorge Beltrán of Habana, hit grand slams in one inning. Remarkably, on the same day major leaguers Cecil Cooper and Don Money of the Milwaukee Brewers accomplished the same feat.
- In 1985 Lázaro Vargas of Industriales set the Cuban National Series record for consecutive-game hitting streak by hitting safely in 31 straight games.
- In 1990 all-time Cuban great Omar Linares hit better than .400 for the third time to win his third batting title. Linares is widely considered to be one of the greatest third basemen of all time.
- In March 1994 Lázaro Junco wins his eighth home run title. Junco retired with the career record of 405 home runs (later surpassed by Orestes Kindelán).
- On 28 March 1999 the Baltimore Orioles are the first Major League team in 40 years to play in Cuba, playing against the Cuba national baseball team before 55,000 fans in Latin American Stadium in Havana.

In 2015, the Under-23 division of the Cuban National Series began its debut season, with its players being below 23 years of age, which replaced the Super Series officially.

In 2022, INDER and the BFC officially ended the long monopoly of the National Series as the sole national baseball circuit, beginning that year the Cuban Elite League was launched as the country's fall baseball circuit with the NS now moved to the spring, in competition with Major League Baseball and the Mexican League.

== Emigrants ==
A number of immigrants from Cuba (sometimes described as "defectors") have played for the major leagues. Immediately after the Cuban Revolution many of the former professional baseball players emigrated, but for the next 30 years relatively few left Cuba.

Since 1991, however, a number of prominent Cuban baseball players have emigrated to compete in the MLB, the Mexican League, other Central American and Caribbean leagues and beginning in the 2000s, Nippon Professional Baseball. The 2023 World Baseball Classic national team was the first ever to feature international players either from Cuba or of Cuban ancenstry.

== See also ==
- Baseball in Cuba
