= 1989–90 Cuban National Series =

Baseball season in Cuba

1989–90 Cuban National Series Serie Nacional de Béisbol 1989–90
- League: Cuban National Series
- Sport: Baseball
- Games: 48
- Teams: 18

Eastern zone
- Best record: Santiago de Cuba (36–12)

Western zone
- Best record: Henequeneros (37–11)

Postseason
- Finals champions: Henequeneros
- Runners-up: Santiago de Cuba

SNB seasons
- ← 1988–89 1990–91 →

In the 29th season of the Cuban National Series, the postseason format was changed. The league directly matched its two division winners in a best-of-seven series for the league championship, while the two division runners-up played a best-of-five series for third place. A four-team round-robin tournament had previously been used, since the 1985–86 season. The 18 teams of the league, and the regular-season schedule of 48 games, remained unchanged.

Henequeneros of Matanzas Province defeated Santiago de Cuba, four games to two, for the championship. Third place was won by Industriales over Granma.

== Standings ==
=== Western zone ===
Team	W	L	Pct.	GB
Henequeneros (Matanzas)	37	11	.770	-
Industriales (Havana)	33	15	.600	4
Vegueros (Pinar del Río)	33	15	.600	4
Metropolitanos (Havana)	31	17	.645	6
La Habana	27	21	.500	10
Cienfuegos	18	30	.375	19
Citricultores (Matanzas)	15	33	.300	22
Isla de la Juventud	14	34	.291	23
Forestales (Pinar del Río)	8	40	.166	29

=== Eastern zone ===
Team	W	L	Pct.	GB
Santiago de Cuba	36	12	.750	-
Granma	28	20	.583	8
Villa Clara	26	22	.541	10
Holguín	26	22	.541	10
Las Tunas	25	23	.520	11
Camagüey	24	24	.500	12
Sancti Spíritus	18	30	.375	18
Ciego de Ávila	17	31	.354	19
Guantánamo	16	32	.333	20

== Playoffs ==
- Championship: Henequeneros defeated Santiago de Cuba, 4–2 games
- Third place: Industriales defeated Granma, 3–0 games
