= Maikel Folch =

Cuban baseball player (born 1980)

- Pitcher
- Born: 11 January 1980 (age 46); Florencia, Ciego de Ávila Province, Cuba
- Bats: Right Throws: Left

Teams
- Ciego de Ávila (2001–2013; 2018–2019)
Medals
Men's baseball
Representing Cuba
World Baseball Classic
Silver medal – second place	2006 San Diego	Team
Baseball World Cup
Silver medal – second place	2009 Nettuno	Team

Maikel Folch Vera (born 11 January 1980) is a former left-handed pitcher for the Cuba national baseball team and Ciego de Ávila in the Cuban National Series. Folch represented Cuba at the 2006 World Baseball Classic and the 2009 Baseball World Cup, winning the silver medal in both competitions.

== Career ==
Folch was born on 11 January 1980 in Florencia in the Ciego de Ávila Province. He made his debut in the Cuban National Series in 2001 playing for Ciego de Ávila. He posted a league-low 2.09 ERA during the 2004–05 season, compiling a 10–0 record.

He retired after the 2012–13 season due to injury, but returned in 2018–19 for one final season with Tigres de Ciego de Ávila, appearing in 18 games and recording a 5–4 record, one save, and a 3.49 ERA.

Cuban National Series career statistics
Seasons	G	W	L	SV	IP	H	R	ER	ERA	WHIP	BB	SO
12	216	80	46	4	1078.1	1090	526	458	3.82	1.53	559	564

== International career ==
Folch played for Cuba at the 2006 World Baseball Classic and the 2009 Baseball World Cup, winning the silver medal in both tournaments.

== Personal life ==
As of 2018, Folch resided in the village of Piedra, in the municipality of Chambas, Ciego de Ávila Province. He has two children: Brayan and Maikol.
