= Vicyohandri Odelín =

Cuban baseball player

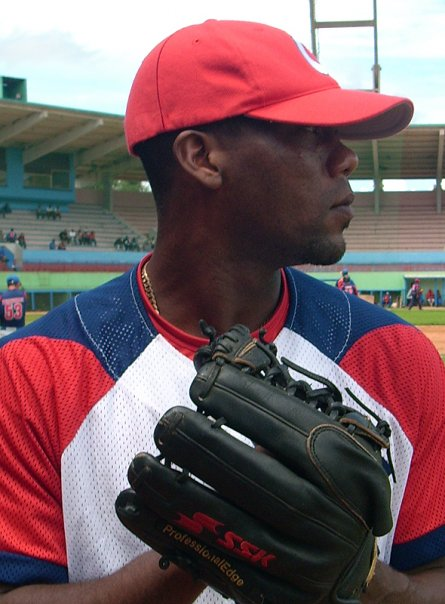
- Odelín in December 2009
- Pitcher
- Born: 26 February 1980 (age 46); Guantánamo, Guantánamo Province, Cuba
- Bats: Right Throws: Right

Teams
- Camagüey (1997–2013); Industriales (2013–2015); Camagüey (2015–2020)
Medals
Men's baseball
Representing Cuba
World Baseball Classic
Silver medal – second place	2006 San Diego	Team
Olympic Games
Gold medal – first place	2004 Athens	Team
Silver medal – second place	2008 Beijing	Team
Baseball World Cup
Gold medal – first place	2001 Taipei	Team
Gold medal – first place	2003 Havana	Team
Intercontinental Cup
Gold medal – first place	2002 Havana	Team
Pan American Games
Gold medal – first place	2003 Santo Domingo	Team
Bronze medal – third place	2011 Guadalajara	Team
Central American and Caribbean Games
Gold medal – first place	2006 Cartagena	Team

Vicyohandri Odelín Sanamé (born 26 February 1980) is a Cuban former right-handed baseball pitcher who played for the Cuban national baseball team and Camagüey in the Cuban National Series. Nicknamed "Villo", Odelín represented Cuba internationally, winning a gold medal at the 2004 Olympics, a silver at the inaugural 2006 World Baseball Classic, and another silver at the 2008 Olympics.

== Early life ==
Odelín was born on 26 February 1980 in Guantánamo, but his family moved to Camagüey when he was a child. There, he began playing baseball and idolizing Omar Luis, dreaming of becoming like him. He played both infield and pitched. Due to his lack of height, he never attempted to enter the Escuela de Iniciación Deportiva Escolar (School for Sports Initiation); however, he was later selected to the Cuban youth national team.

== Career ==
Odelín made his debut in the Cuban National Series as a pitcher during the 1997–98 season for Camagüey. In his debut season, he appeared in six games, compiling a 2–0 record.

He played with Camagüey through the 2019–20 season, remaining with the team for the vast majority of his career. The only exceptions came during the 2013–14 and 2014–15 seasons, when he played for Industriales. In total, he spent 21 seasons in Cuban baseball, appearing in 371 games and compiling a 133–116 record.

== Personal life ==
Odelín is nicknamed Villo, Viyo or Vicho. His unusual name stems from a compromise between his parents: his father, Víctor, wanted to name him after himself, while his mother, Martha, preferred Yohandri. They ultimately combined both names to create Vicyohandri.
