= Baseball at the 2003 Pan American Games =

- Venue: Santo Domingo, Dominican Republic
- Competitors: 9 teams

Medalists
Gold medal	Cuba
Silver medal	United States
Bronze medal	Mexico

Baseball at the 2003 Pan American Games was contested between teams representing Bahamas, Brazil, Cuba, Dominican Republic, Guatemala, Mexico, Nicaragua, Panama, and the United States. The 2003 edition was the 14th Pan American Games, and was hosted by Santo Domingo.

Cuba entered the competition as the eight-time defending champions, having won each gold medal dating back to 1971. They successfully defended their title, with the United States finishing second.

== Medal summary ==
=== Medal table ===
Rank	Nation	Gold	Silver	Bronze	Total
1	Cuba	1	0	0	1
2	United States	0	1	0	1
3	Mexico	0	0	1	1
Totals (3 entries)		1	1	1	3

=== Medalists ===
Event	Gold	Silver	Bronze
Men's	Cuba: Yovany Aragón; Orelvis Ávila; Manuel Benavides; Frederich Cepeda; Michel Enríquez; Yuli Gurriel; Vladimir Hernández; Roger Machado; Yadel Martí; Javier Méndez; Vicyohandri Odelín; Adiel Palma; Eduardo Paret; Joan Carlos Pedroso; Ariel Pestano; Alexander Ramos; Carlos Tabares; Norge Luis Vera; Robelquis Videaux	United States: Matt Campbell; Jeff Clement; Tyler Greene; Michael Griffin; Stephen Head; Paul Janish; Jeff Larish; Brent Lillibridge; Mike Nickeas; Justin Orenduff; Micah Owings; Eric Patterson; Dustin Pedroia; Danny Putnam; Steven Register; Mark Romanczuk; Seth Smith; Huston Street; Justin Verlander; Jered Weaver	Mexico: Rigo Beltrán; Lorenzo Buelna; Francisco Campos; Hugo Castellanos; Francisco Córdova; Luis García; Heber Gómez; Julio Hernández; Édgar Huerta; Edgar Leyva; Ray Martínez; Roberto Méndez; Eleazar Mora; Noé Muñoz; Pablo Ortega; Carlos Rodríguez; Salvador Rodríguez; Raúl Sánchez; Mario Santana; Roberto Saucedo; Mario Váldez; Julio Valerio

== Tournament ==
The competition had nine teams divided in two groups. In each group, each team played against all others once and the eight best records advanced to the quarterfinals. The best team from Group A played the lowest ranked team from Group B and vice versa. Ties within a group were broken by the team allowing the fewest runs passing to the knockout round.

=== Preliminary round ===
==== Group A ====
Team	Pld	W	L	RF	RA	Pct
Mexico	3	2	1			0.667
Cuba	3	2	1			0.667
Brazil	3	1	2			0.333
Panama	3	1	2			0.333

==== Group B ====
Team	Pld	W	L	RF	RA	Pct
Nicaragua	4	4	0			1.000
(United States) USA	4	3	1			0.750
Dominican Republic	4	2	2			0.500
Guatemala	4	1	3			0.250
(The Bahamas) Bahamas	4	0	4			0.000

=== Knockout round ===
Quarter-finals
8 August
Mexico	6
Guatemala	0
8 August
Brazil	0
(United States) USA	7
8 August
Cuba	10
Dominican Republic	0
8 August
Panama	2
Nicaragua	5

Semi-finals
9 August
Mexico	2
(United States) USA	3
9 August
Cuba	2
Nicaragua	1

Final
10 August
(United States) USA	1
Cuba	3
Third place
10 August
Mexico	6
Nicaragua	2

== Medal chart ==
(gold) Cuba
(silver) United States of America.
(bronze) Mexico

== See also ==
- Softball at the 2003 Pan American Games
