= Osvaldo Vázquez =

Cuban baseball player (born 1990)

Tigres de Ciego de Ávila
- Catcher
- Born: May 20, 1990 (age 36); Ciego de Ávila, Cuba
- Bats: Right Throws: Right
- Stats at Baseball Reference

Osvaldo Vázquez Torres (born May 20, 1990) is a Cuban professional baseball catcher for Tigres de Ciego de Avila in the Cuban National Series.

Vazquez played for the Cuba national baseball team at the 2015 World Port Tournament, 2015 Premier12 and 2017 World Baseball Classic.
