= Noelvis Entenza =

Cuban baseball player (born 1985)

Cocodrilos de Matanzas – No. 90
- Pitcher
- Born: 13 July 1985 (age 41); Palmira, Cienfuegos, Cuba
- Bats: Right Throws: Right
- Stats at Baseball Reference

Teams
- Cienfuegos (2003–2013); Industriales (2013–2019); Matanzas (2019–present)

Noelvis Entenza González (born 13 July 1985) is a Cuban professional baseball pitcher for the Cocodrilos de Matanzas in the Cuban National Series.

== Career ==
Entenza was born on 13 July 1985 in Palmira, Cienfuegos Province, Cuba. He made his Cuban National Series debut in 2003 for Cienfuegos.

Entenza played for the Cuba national baseball team at the 2009 World Port Tournament and 2017 World Baseball Classic.

Entenza has also played for the Kitchener Panthers of the Canadian Baseball League.
