= 2007 World Port Tournament =

The 2007 World Port Tournament was an international baseball competition held at the Neptunus Familiestadion in Rotterdam, the Netherlands from August 2–12, 2007. It was the 11th edition of the tournament and featured teams from Chinese Taipei, Cuba, Japan, the Netherlands, and the United States.

Cuba won the tournament with a 2–0 victory over the Chinese Taipei in the championship game. Yosvani Pérez was named the tournament's most valuable player.

== Group stage ==
=== Standings ===
Qualified for the final
Did not qualify for the final

Team	Games	Wins	Losses	Runs scored	Runs allowed
Cuba	8	8	0	50	16
Chinese Taipei	8	4	4	24	24
United States	8	4	4	40	26
Netherlands	8	4	4	19	36
Japan	8	0	8	13	44

- ^1 Chinese Taipei is the official IBAF designation for the team representing the state officially referred to as the Republic of China, more commonly known as Taiwan. (See also political status of Taiwan for details.)
- ^2 Final placement for 2nd through 4th in group play is based on the results of the individual games between Chinese Taipei, the United States and the Netherlands (games 4, 6, 8, 14, 16 and 17).

=== Game results ===
Team	1	2	3	4	5	6	7	8	9	R	H	E
Chinese Taipei	0	0	1	0	0	0	0	0	0	1	5	0
Cuba	0	0	0	0	0	0	2	0	x	2	5	1

Team	1	2	3	4	5	6	7	8	9	R	H	E
Cuba	0	2	5	3	0	0	1	0	0	11	14	0
Japan	0	0	0	3	0	0	0	0	0	3	7	0

Team	1	2	3	4	5	6	7	8	9	R	H	E
Chinese Taipei	0	1	0	1	0	1	0	0	0	3	6	0
Japan	0	0	1	0	0	0	0	0		1	6	0

Team	1	2	3	4	5	6	7	8	9	R	H	E
Cuba	1	0	1	1	0	2	0	0	0	5	14	2
Netherlands	0	0	0	0	0	0	0	1	1	2	6	1

Team	1	2	3	4	5	6	7	8	9	R	H	E
United States	0	0	0	0	2	0	0	0	0	2	6	1
Cuba	1	0	0	1	0	1	5	0	X	8	11	0

Team	1	2	3	4	5	6	7	8	9	10	11	12	13	R	H	E
Cuba	0	0	0	0	4	0	0	0	1	0	0	0	1	6	20	2
Chinese Taipei	0	2	0	1	1	0	0	1	0	0	0	0	0	5	12	4

Team	1	2	3	4	5	6	7	8	9	R	H	E
Japan	0	1	0	0	0	0	0	0	0	1	5	2
Cuba	0	2	1	1	0	0	4	0	X	8	13	0

Team	1	2	3	4	5	6	7	8	9	R	H	E
Japan	0	0	0	0	2	0	1	0	0	3	6	1
Chinese Taipei	0	0	0	1	0	1	2	0	X	4	10	0

Team	1	2	3	4	5	6	7	8	9	R	H	E
United States	0	0	0	0	0	0	0	0	0	0	3	1
Chinese Taipei	1	0	0	0	0	0	0	0	X	1	6	1

Team	1	2	3	4	5	6	7	8	9	R	H	E
Cuba	2	0	0	1	0	0	1	0	1	5	10	1
United States	0	0	0	0	0	0	1	0	0	1	7	1

Team	1	2	3	4	5	6	7	8	9	R	H	E
United States	0	0	0	0	0	0	0	0	1	1	1	1
Japan	0	0	0	0	0	0	0	0	0	0	3	0

Team	1	2	3	4	5	6	7	8	9	R	H	E
Netherlands	0	1	1	0	0	1	0	0	0	3	5	0
Chinese Taipei	0	0	0	0	0	0	0	0	0	0	6	2

Team	1	2	3	4	5	6	7	8	9	R	H	E
United States	2	1	0	0	3	0	3	2		11	16	1
Netherlands	0	0	0	0	0	0	0	0	0	0	8	1

Team	1	2	3	4	5	6	7	8	9	R	H	E
Chinese Taipei	0	0	1	1	5	0	0	0	3	10	11	1
United States	0	0	3	2	0	0	0	0	0	5	8	2

Team	1	2	3	4	5	6	7	8	9	R	H	E
Netherlands	3	0	0	0	0	1	0	0	0	4	9	0
Japan	0	1	0	1	1	0	0	0	0	3	5	2

Team	1	2	3	4	5	6	7	R	H	E
Japan	0	0	0	0	0	0	0	0	4	1
United States	2	0	0	1	0	7	X	10	13	1

Team	1	2	3	4	5	6	7	8	9	R	H	E
Chinese Taipei	0	0	0	0	0	0	0	0	0	0	3	0
Netherlands	1	0	0	0	0	0	3	0	X	4	6	1

Team	1	2	3	4	5	6	7	8	9	R	H	E
Netherlands	0	1	0	0	0	0	0	0	1	2	8	1
United States	3	1	0	3	0	2	0	1	X	10	12	0

Team	1	2	3	4	5	6	7	8	9	R	H	E
Netherlands	0	0	0	0	0	0	0	1	0	1	5	5
Cuba	1	2	1	0	0	0	1	0	X	5	9	1

Team	1	2	3	4	5	6	7	8	9	10	11	R	H	E
Japan	2	0	0	0	0	0	0	0	0	0	0	2	5	1
Netherlands	2	0	0	0	0	0	0	0	0	0	1	3	6	1

== Championship game ==
Team	1	2	3	4	5	6	7	8	9	R	H	E
Chinese Taipei	0	0	0	0	0	0	0	0	0	0	6	0
Cuba	0	0	0	1	0	1	0	0	x	2	6	0

== Tournament awards and statistics ==
Best Hitter	(Cuba) Alfredo Despaigne
Best Pitcher	(Netherlands) Leon Boyd
Most Valuable Player	(Cuba) Yosvani Pérez
Most Popular Player	(Japan) Ryoji Nakata
Home Run King	(Cuba) José Julio Ruiz
Rookie Award	(United States) Jordan Danks
Press Award	(Netherlands) Leon Boyd
