= Yorelvis Charles =

Cuban baseball player

Medal record

Men's baseball

Representing Cuba

Summer Olympics
Gold medal – first place	2004 Athens	Team

Baseball World Cup
Gold medal – first place	2003 Havana	Team

Intercontinental Cup
Gold medal – first place	2002 Havana	Team

Yorelvis Charles Martínez (born September 25, 1978 in Morón, Cuba) is a third baseman for Ciego de Ávila of the Cuban National Series and has also been a member of the Cuba national baseball team.

During the 90-game 2005-06 Cuban National Series, Charles batted .344 with 17 home runs and 72 runs batted in.

In November 2023 arrived to the U.S along with his family through Humanitarian Parole.
