= 2022 Cuban National Series =

2022 Cuban National Series Serie Nacional de Béisbol 2022
- League: Cuban National Series
- Sport: Baseball
- Duration: 23 January – 22 May
- Number of games: 75
- Number of teams: 16

Regular season
- Best record: Sancti Spíritus (45–30)

Postseason
- Finals champions: Granma (4th title)
- Runners-up: Matanzas

SNB seasons
- ← 2020–21 2023 →

The 2022 Cuban National Series was the 61st season of the league. This was the first season that the league did not play a schedule spanning two calendar years, as the regular season began on 23 January and ended on 22 May. In the series' final round, contested in June, Granma defeated Matanzas in a rematch of the prior season's final.
