= Jozzen Cuesta =

Cuban baseball player

- First baseman
- Born: 1988 or 1989 (age 35–36); Cuba
- Bats: Right Throws: Right

Jozzen Cuesta Padrón is a Cuban professional baseball infielder.

== Career ==
Cuesta played for Ciego de Ávila in the Cuban National Series. Cuesta went missing in August before the Cuba national baseball team could win the championship of the 2013 World Baseball Challenge against in Japan in Canada in Prince George, BC, in August. It was believed that Cuesta defected from Cuba to pursue a career in Major League Baseball and meet up with his wife who had gone to the United States three months earlier.
