= Norge Luis Vera =

Cuban baseball player

Medal record

Men's baseball

Representing Cuba

Olympic Games
Gold medal – first place	2004 Athens	Team
Silver medal – second place	2000 Sydney	Team
Silver medal – second place	2008 Beijing	Team

Baseball World Cup
Gold medal – first place	1998 Rome	Team
Gold medal – first place	2001 Taipei	Team
Gold medal – first place	2003 Havana	Team
Silver medal – second place	2009 Nettuno	Team

Intercontinental Cup
Gold medal – first place	2002 Havana	Team
Gold medal – first place	2006 Taichung	Team

Pan American Games
Gold medal – first place	1999 Winnipeg	Team
Gold medal – first place	2003 Santo Domingo	Team
Gold medal – first place	2007 Rio de Janeiro	Team

Norge Luis Vera Peralta (born October 3, 1971, in Siboney, Santiago de Cuba Province) is a right-handed baseball pitcher, who has been a frequent member of the Cuba national baseball team.

In Cuba, Vera pitches for Santiago de Cuba of the Cuban National Series. He has been a dominating force for years, including the 1999–2000 series, when he led the league with a 0.97 ERA, 17 victories and eight shutouts—all in a 90-game season. He then pitched in the second game of the 1999 Baltimore Orioles–Cuba national baseball team exhibition series.

Vera was seriously injured in November 2009, while trying to stop a fight as an uninvolved bystander in Santiago, Cuba. He was struck in the face by a blunt instrument, sustaining several fractures to the upper jaw. Zadys Navarro, one of Vera's doctors, indicated that reconstructive surgery would be required.

His son, Norge Vera, plays in the Chicago White Sox organization.
