= 2020–21 Cuban National Series =

2020–21 Cuban National Series Serie Nacional de Béisbol 2020–21
- League: Cuban National Series
- Sport: Baseball
- Duration: 12 September – 20 January
- Number of games: 75
- Number of teams: 16

Regular season
- Best record: Sancti Spíritus & Granma (48–27)

Postseason
- Finals champions: Granma (3rd title)
- Runners-up: Matanzas

SNB seasons
- ← 2019–20 2022 →

The 2020–21 Cuban National Series was the 60th season of the league. Granma defeated defending champion Matanzas in the series' final round.
