= Yadel Martí =

Cuban right-handed pitcher (born 1979)

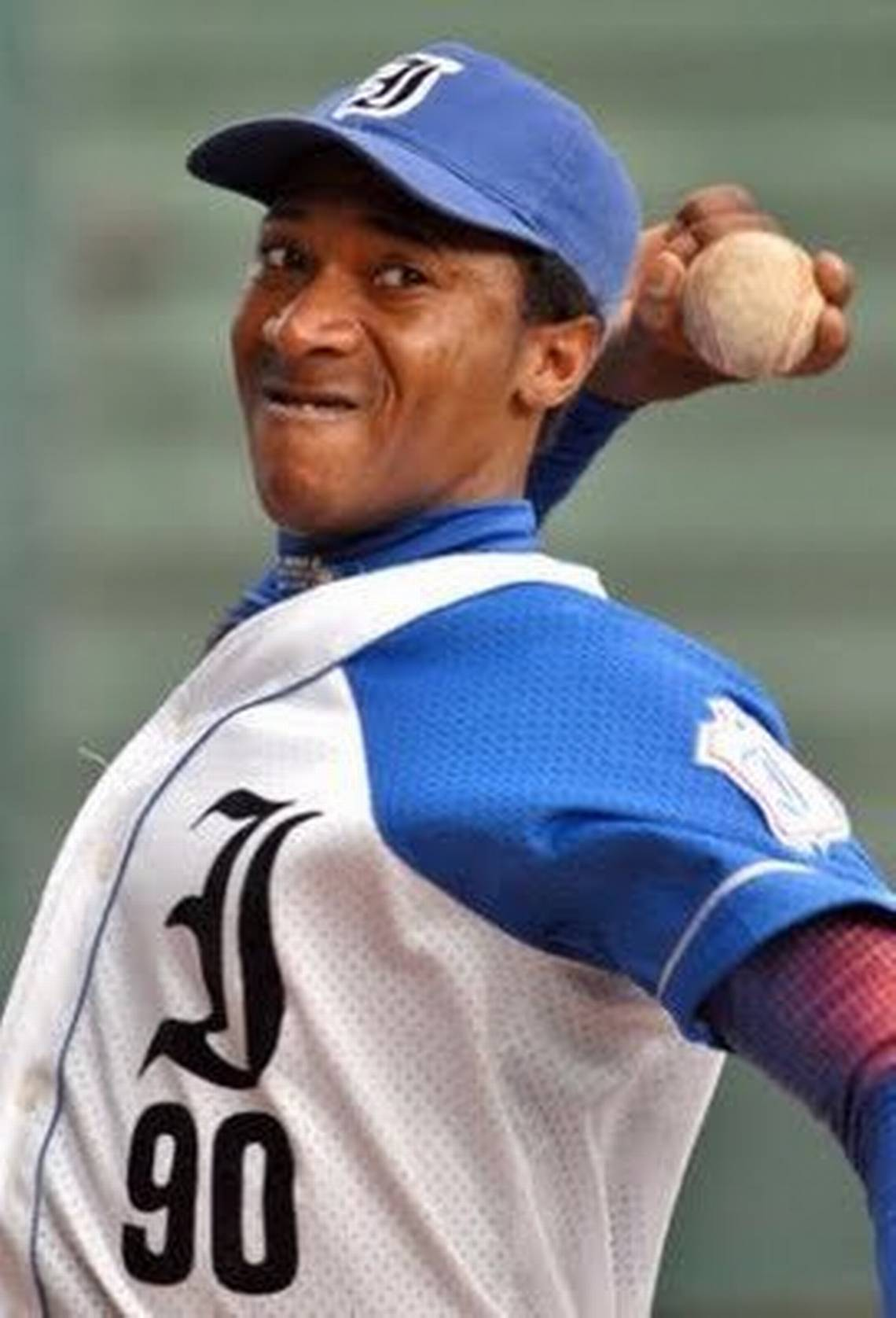
- Pitcher
- Born: July 22, 1979 (age 47); Havana, Cuba
- Bats: Right Throws: Right
- Stats at Baseball Reference

Career highlights and awards
- All-World Baseball Classic Team (2006)
Medals
Men's baseball
Representing Cuba
World Baseball Classic
Silver medal – second place	2006 San Diego	Team
Baseball World Cup
Gold medal – first place	2003 Havana	Team
Silver medal – second place	2007 Taipei	Team
Intercontinental Cup
Gold medal – first place	2002 Havana	Team
Gold medal – first place	2006 Taichung	Team
Pan American Games
Gold medal – first place	2003 Santo Domingo	Team
Central American and Caribbean Games
Gold medal – first place	2006 Cartagena	Team

Yadel Martí Carrillo (born July 22, 1979) is a Cuban former right-handed pitcher.

== Career ==
Martí was 1-0 with two saves and no earned runs at the 2006 World Baseball Classic, helping Cuba to a second-place finish. He was named to the all-tournament team. He also pitched for Cuba in the 2007 Baseball World Cup, coming one out short of a seven-inning perfect game against Venezuela.

=== Defection ===
Martí was originally slated to play in the 2009 World Baseball Classic, but he and Yasser Gómez were kicked off the team in November 2008 for an unspecified reason, believed to be an attempted defection to the United States. Marti, Gómez and Juan Yasser Serrano reportedly defected from Cuba in December 2008 in an effort to get to the Dominican Republic to seek a Major League Baseball career. In August 2009, they were declared free agents.

Martí pitched in the Dominican Winter Baseball League in the winter of 2009–10 and joined Veracruz of the Mexican League in 2010, going 2-2 with a 4.19 ERA in eight starts.

=== Oakland Athletics ===
Martí signed with the Oakland Athletics as a free agent to a Minor League contract on August 6, 2010. Martí was invited to spring training with the Athletics in 2011 as a non-roster invitee. He played the 2011 season with the Stockton Ports of the Class-A Advanced California League, the Midland RockHounds of the Class-AA Texas League, and the Sacramento River Cats of the Class-AAA Pacific Coast League.

== Pitching style ==
Martí pitches with a pause in his delivery, in a similar fashion to many Japanese pitchers. He possesses a sharp-breaking curveball and a diving changeup to complement his fastball.

== See also ==
- List of baseball players who defected from Cuba
