= Higinio Vélez =

Cuban baseball manager (1946–2021)

- Manager
- Born: 27 July 1946; Songo – La Maya, Oriente Province, Cuba
- Died: 12 May 2021 (aged 74); Havana, Cuba
Medals
Men's baseball
Manager for Cuba
World Baseball Classic
Silver medal – second place	2006 San Diego	Team
Summer Olympics
Gold medal – first place	2004 Athens	Team
Baseball World Cup
Gold medal – first place	2001 Taiwan	Team
Gold medal – first place	2003 Cuba	Team
Gold medal – first place	2005 Netherlands	Team

Higinio Vélez Carrión (27 July 1946 – 12 May 2021) was a Cuban baseball manager and executive. He was the longtime president of the Baseball Federation of Cuba as well as manager of the Cuba national baseball team, which he led to three consecutive championships at the Baseball World Cup from 2003 to 2005, an Olympic gold medal at Athens 2004 and a silver medal in the inaugural edition of the World Baseball Classic in 2006.

== Biography ==
Vélez was born on 27 July 1946 in Songo – La Maya in the Oriente Province (currently in the Santiago de Cuba Province). He was born into a peasant family and learned to play baseball thanks to his father, Juan Walberto Vélez. He played as a shortstop and made it into regional teams. In 1966, he enrolled at the Escuela Superior de Educación Física (Higher School of Physical Education) in Havana, where he joined the school's baseball team. In his third year, manager Juan Ealo informed him that he would no longer play and instead appointed him as the team's new manager.

In 1970, after graduating, Vélez joined Mineros, the baseball team that represented Santiago de Cuba at the Cuban National Series, as assistant to manager Roberto Ledo. He worked as the Mineros' first base coach and physical trainer.

After leading Santiago de Cuba to three straight championships in the Cuban National Series (1999–2001), he became the manager of the Cuba national baseball team, that would take home a gold medal from the 2004 Summer Olympics. He also managed the Cuban team at the 2001, 2003, 2005 editions of the Baseball World Cup and the 2006 and 2009 editions of the World Baseball Classic.

Vélez was replaced as manager of the national team after the Classic, when he was asked to head the Cuban National Baseball Commission. In June 2008, he was elected president of the Baseball Federation of Cuba, a position which he would hold until his death in 2021.

Despite his success as a manager, Vélez's legacy as head of the Cuban federation is polarizing. Some described his tenure as the beginning of a period of decline in Cuban baseball, noting increased defections from Cuba as players increasingly sought to play in Major League Baseball. However, Vélez also sought to open up Cuban baseball by permitting more players to pursue professional contracts in Japan and elsewhere in the Caribbean. He also brokered an agreement that would have allowed Cuban baseball players to sign with MLB teams without having to defect, but the deal was revoked by the Trump administration in April 2019.

Velez died from COVID-19 on 12 May 2021, at age 73, in Havana during the COVID-19 pandemic in Cuba.
