= 2004–05 Cuban National Series =

The 44th Cuban National Series was won by Santiago de Cuba over Havana. Industriales, who had the best regular season record, were eliminated in the first round by Sancti Spíritus.

== Regular season standings ==
=== Western zone ===
Group A
| Team | W | L | PCT. | GB |
|---|---|---|---|---|
| Pinar del Río | 55 | 34 | .618 | - |
| Isla de la Juventud | 42 | 48 | .467 | 13½ |
| Metropolitanos | 33 | 57 | .367 | 22½ |
| Matanzas | 28 | 61 | .315 | 27 |

Group B
| Team | W | L | PCT. | GB |
|---|---|---|---|---|
| Industriales | 59 | 30 | .656 | - |
| Havana Province | 54 | 35 | .600 | 5 |
| Sancti Spíritus | 54 | 36 | .600 | 5½ |
| Cienfuegos | 31 | 59 | .344 | 28½ |

=== Eastern zone ===
Group C
| Team | W | L | PCT. | GB |
|---|---|---|---|---|
| Ciego de Ávila | 54 | 36 | .600 | - |
| Villa Clara | 51 | 39 | .567 | 3 |
| Las Tunas | 47 | 43 | .522 | 7 |
| Camagüey | 35 | 55 | .389 | 19 |

Group D
| Team | W | L | PCT. | GB |
|---|---|---|---|---|
| Santiago de Cuba | 55 | 35 | .611 | - |
| Granma | 50 | 40 | .556 | 5 |
| Holguín | 37 | 53 | .411 | 18 |
| Guantánamo | 33 | 57 | .367 | 22 |

== Playoffs ==
Quarterfinals
B1 | Industriales | 1
B3 | Sancti Spíritus | 3
West
A1 | Pinar del Río | 1
B2 | Havana Province | 3
D1 | Santiago de Cuba | 3
D2 | Granma | 0
East
C1 | Ciego de Ávila | 0
C2 | Villa Clara | 3

Semifinals
B3 | Sancti Spíritus | 2
B2 | Havana Province | 4
D1 | Santiago de Cuba | 4
C2 | Villa Clara | 0

Finals
B2 | Havana Province | 2
D1 | Santiago de Cuba | 4
