= Frank Madán =

Cuban pitcher (born 1991)

Toros de Camagüey – No. 14
- Pitcher
- Born: August 28, 1991 (age 35)
- Bats: Right Throws: Right

Professional debut
- Cuban National Series: 2009, for the Toros de Camagüey
- Serie A: 2023, for the Palfinger Reggio Rays

Frank Edelmiro Madán (born August 28, 1991) is a Cuban baseball pitcher who plays for the Toros de Camagüey in the Cuban National Series. He has also played in the Italian Baseball League for the Palfinger Reggio Rays since 2023.

He pitched for Cuba at the 2019 Premier12, the qualification tournament for the 2020 Summer Olympics.
