= Alexander Ayala =

Cuban baseball player (born 1981)

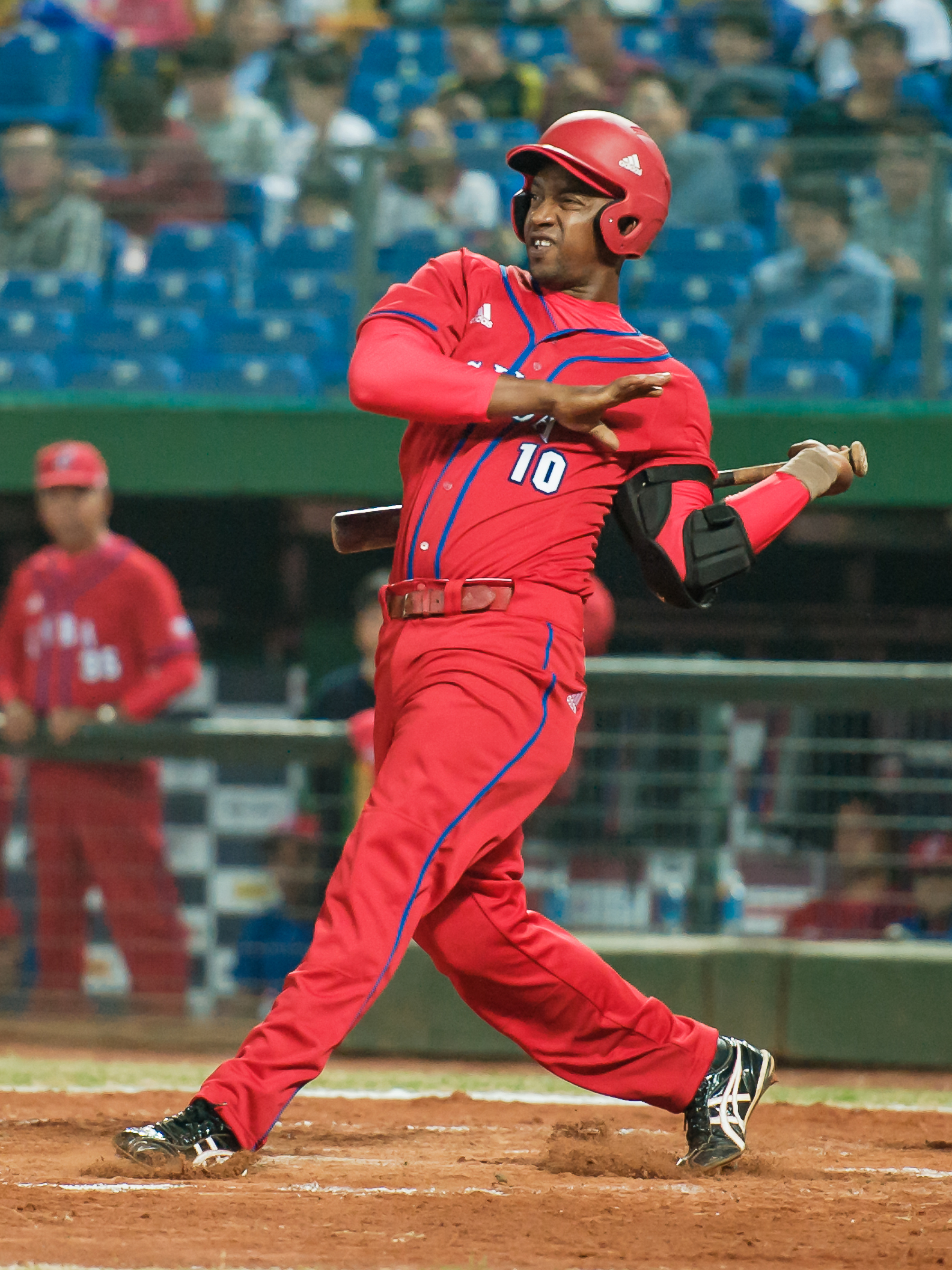
- Ayala in 2017

Toros de Camagüey
- Shortstop
- Born: December 31, 1981 (age 44); Camagüey Province, Cuba
- Bats: Right Throws: Right
- Stats at Baseball Reference
Medals
Men's baseball
Representing Cuba
Central American and Caribbean Games
Silver medal – second place	2018 Barranquilla	Team

Alexander Ayala García (born December 31, 1981) is a Cuban professional baseball shortstop who currently plays for Toros de Camagüey in the Cuban National Series.

Ayala played for the Cuban national baseball team at the 2010 Haarlem Baseball Week and 2017 World Baseball Classic.
