= Rolando Meriño =

Cuban baseball player (born 1971)

- Catcher
- Born: 17 February 1971 (age 55); Santiago de Cuba Province, Cuba
- Bats: Right Throws: Right

Teams
- Santiago de Cuba (1991–2012)
Medals
Men's baseball
Representing Cuba
Summer Olympics
Silver medal – second place	2000 Sydney	Team
Silver medal – second place	2008 Beijing	Team
Baseball World Cup
Gold medal – first place	2001 Taipei	Team

Rolando Meriño Betancourt (born 17 February 1971) is a Cuban former professional baseball catcher. He won silver medals at the 2000 and 2008 Summer Olympics.

== Career ==
Meriño was born on 17 February 1971 in the Santiago de Cuba Province. He made his Cuban National Series debut in 1991 playing for Santiago de Cuba and last played for the team during the 2011–12 season.

He was part of the Cuban teams that won silver medals at the 2000 and 2008 Summer Olympics and a gold medal at the 2001 Baseball World Cup.

Meriño defected in 2013 and moved to France, where he joined the Templiers de Sénart; in 2014, he acted as player-manager for the club. He represented Spain at the 2017 World Baseball Classic qualification, where the team failed to qualify to the main tournament.

== Personal life ==
Meriño lives in the United States. His son, Patrick, is also a baseball player and was part of the Tampa Bay Rays organization from 2019 to 2022 and previously played for Santiago de Cuba during the 2017–18 Cuban National Series season.
