= Ryoji Nakata =

Japanese baseball player (born 1987)

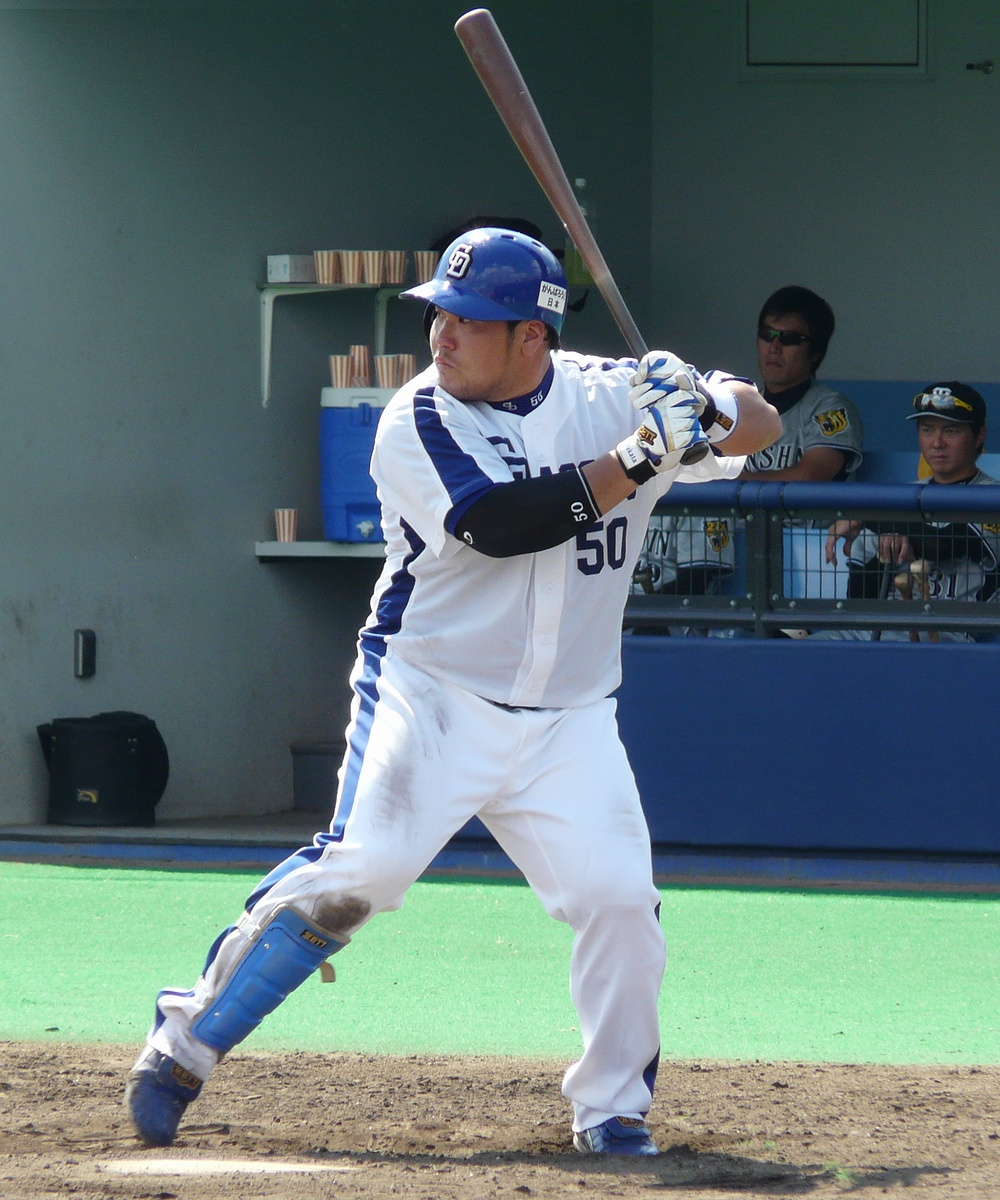
- First baseman
- Born: November 3, 1987 (age 38)
- Bats: Left Throws: Right

NPB debut
- 2010, for the Chunichi Dragons

NPB statistics (through 2014)
- Batting average: .202
- Home runs: 0
- RBI: 3
- Stats at Baseball Reference

Teams
- Chunichi Dragons (2010–2014)

Ryoji Nakata (中田 亮二, born November 3, 1987, in Japan) is a Japanese former professional baseball first baseman who played for the Chunichi Dragons in Japan's Nippon Professional Baseball from 2010 to 2014.
