= Leslie Anderson =

Cuban baseball player (born 1982)

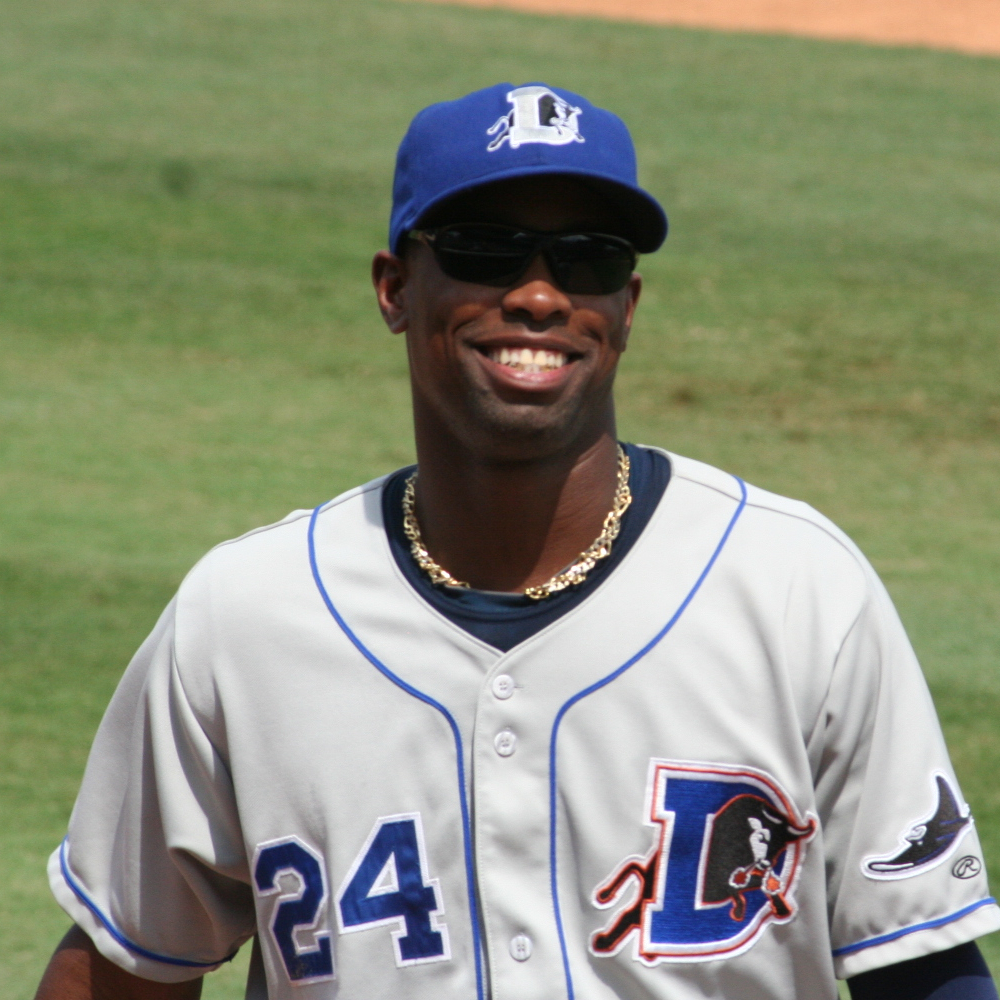
- Anderson with the Durham Bulls

Toros de Camagüey
- First baseman / Outfielder
- Born: March 30, 1982 (age 43); Guantánamo, Cuba
- Bats: Left Throws: Left

NPB debut
- March 28, 2014, for the Yomiuri Giants

NPB statistics (through 2016 season)
- Batting average: .288
- Home runs: 22
- Runs batted in: 82
- Stats at Baseball Reference

Teams
- Yomiuri Giants (2014–2016)
Medals
Men's baseball
Representing Cuba
World Baseball Classic
Silver medal – second place	2006 San Diego	Team
Baseball World Cup
Gold medal – first place	2005 Rotterdam	Team

Leslie Anderson Stephes (born March 30, 1982) is a Cuban professional baseball first baseman and outfielder for the Toros de Camagüey of the Cuban National Series (CNS). He has previously played in Nippon Professional Baseball (NPB) for the Yomiuri Giants.

== Career ==
=== Cuban career ===
Anderson previously played for the Cuban national baseball team and Camagüey of the Cuban National Series. He was part of Cuba's roster at the 2006 and 2009 World Baseball Classics.

Anderson, who is primarily a center fielder, hit .363 during the 2005-06 season.

=== Tampa Bay Rays ===
Anderson defected from Cuba and signed a four-year contract worth $1.7 million with the Tampa Bay Rays on April 13, 2010. He split the year between the High-A Charlotte Stone Crabs, Double-A Montgomery Biscuits, and Triple-A Durham Bulls, batting a cumulative .302/.359/.442 with 11 home runs and 49 RBI across 99 total games. Anderson returned to Durham in 2011, hitting .277/.314/.413 with 13 home runs and 65 RBI over 121 contests.

Anderson made 116 appearances for Triple-A Durham in 2012, batting .309/.355/.450 with 14 home runs and 56 RBI. He returned to Durham in 2013, playing in 119 games and hitting .292/.372/.459 with 14 home runs and 74 RBI. Anderson was released by the Rays organization on December 27, 2013, in order to pursue an opportunity in Asia.

=== Yomiuri Giants ===
Following his release by the Rays, Anderson signed with the Yomiuri Giants of Nippon Professional Baseball. He made 87 appearances for Yomiuri in 2014, batting .319/.382/.515 with 15 home runs and 50 RBI.

Anderson played in 83 contests for the Giants during the 2015 season, slashing .252/.327/.402 with seven home runs and 31 RBI. He made only three appearances for the club in 2016, going 3-for-12 (.250) with one RBI. On December 2, 2016, it was confirmed that Anderson had been released by the Giants.

=== Bravos de León ===
On May 6, 2017, Anderson signed with the Bravos de León of the Mexican League. In 21 appearances for the team, he slashed .237/.289/.303 with no home runs and four RBI. Anderson was released by the Bravos on May 29.

=== Defection back to Cuba ===
In 2020, Anderson became the second Cuban player after Erisbel Arruebarrena to come back to the Serie Nacional after defecting and playing for a Major League organization when he signed for the Toros de Camagüey.

== See also ==
- List of baseball players who defected from Cuba
