= Juan Yasser Serrano =

Cuban right-handed pitcher (born 1988)

- Pitcher
- Born: 3 March 1988 (age 38); Villa Clara Province, Cuba
- Bats: Right Throws: Right
- Stats at Baseball Reference

Juan Yasser Serrano (born 3 March 1988, in Villa Clara Province, Cuba) is a Cuban right-handed pitcher.

Serrano pitched for Villa Clara in the Cuban National Series, where he had a 4-16 win–loss record and a 4.40 earned run average. He also pitched for the Cuban Junior National Team. Serrano, Yadel Martí, and Yasser Gómez defected from Cuba in December 2008 in an effort to get to the Dominican Republic to seek a Major League Baseball career. In August 2009, they were declared free agents.

Before the 2010 season, Serrano signed a contract worth $250,000 with the Chicago Cubs. He pitched for the Cubs organization through 2011.

== See also ==
- List of baseball players who defected from Cuba
