= 2007–08 Cuban National Series =

The 47th Cuban National Series was won by the defending champion Santiago de Cuba over Pinar del Río, who made it to the finals despite an even regular season record. Santiago had the best regular season record along with La Habana, who lost in the first round.

== Regular season standings ==
=== West ===
Group A
Team	W	L	PCT.	GB
Pinar del Río	45	45	.500	-
Isla de la Juventud	40	50	.444	5
Matanzas	34	56	.378	11
Metropolitanos	28	61	.315	16½

Group B
Team	W	L	PCT.	GB
La Habana	61	29	.678	-
Industriales	53	35	.602	7
Sancti Spíritus	48	40	.545	12
Cienfuegos	33	57	.367	28

=== East ===
Group C
Team	W	L	PCT.	GB
Villa Clara	55	33	.625	-
Ciego de Ávila	53	37	.589	3
Las Tunas	49	41	.544	7
Camagüey	35	55	.389	21

Group D
Team	W	L	PCT.	GB
Santiago de Cuba	61	29	.678	-
Guantánamo	44	45	.494	16½
Holguín	41	49	.456	20
Granma	36	54	.400	25

== Playoffs ==
Quarterfinals
A1	Pinar del Río	3
B2	Industriales	0
West
B1	La Habana	0
B3	Sancti Spíritus	3
C1	Villa Clara	3
C2	Ciego de Ávila	2
East
D1	Santiago de Cuba	3
C3	Las Tunas	0

Semifinals
A1	Pinar del Río	4
B3	Sancti Spíritus	3
C1	Villa Clara	2
D1	Santiago de Cuba	4

Final
A1	Pinar del Río	0
D1	Santiago de Cuba	4
