= Stephen Head =

American baseball player (born 1984)

Current position
- Title: Midwest Scout
- Team: Los Angeles Dodgers

Biographical details
- Born: January 13, 1984 (age 42); Raymond, Mississippi, U.S.

Playing career
- 2003–2005: Ole Miss
- 2005: Mahoning Valley Scrappers
- 2005–2007: Kinston Indians
- 2007–2008: Akron Aeros
- 2009: Columbus Clippers
- 2009: Mahoning Valley Scrappers
- 2010: Southern Illinois Miners
- 2011: Tri-City Dust Devils
- 2011: Asheville Tourists
- Position: First baseman / Outfielder

Coaching career (HC unless noted)
- 2012: Ole Miss (SA)
- 2014–2015: Ole Miss (BC)

Administrative career (AD unless noted)
- 2013: Ole Miss (DO)
- 2019–present: Los Angeles Dodgers (Scout)

Accomplishments and honors

Awards
- SEC Player of the Year (2004)

Medal record

Men's baseball

Representing United States

Pan American Games
Silver medal – second place	2003 Santo Domingo	Team competition

Stephen Anthony Head (born January 13, 1984) is an American professional baseball scout and former infielder and outfielder, who is currently a scout of the Los Angeles Dodgers organization. He played college baseball at Ole Miss for head coach Mike Bianco from 2003 to 2005 before playing professionally from 2005 to 2011. He then spent 4 years as an assistant coach at Ole Miss (2012–2015)

== Early years ==
Head attended Hillcrest Christian School (Jackson, Mississippi) and the University of Mississippi. He was the designated hitter for the United States national baseball team during the 2003 Pan American Games, receiving a silver medal for his efforts. In 2004, Head was the inaugural recipient of the Ferriss Trophy (now the C Spire Ferriss Trophy), awarded annually to Mississippi's top collegiate baseball player. Head was selected by the Cleveland Indians with the 62nd overall pick in the 2005 Major League Baseball draft.

== Professional baseball ==
From 2005 through 2009, Head played in the Indians' farm system, reaching as high as Triple-A with the Columbus Clippers. Head spent the 2008 season with the Akron Aeros and helped lead the team to the Eastern League Championship Series. He played in 2010 with the independent Southern Illinois Miners of the Frontier League. His final season of professional baseball was 2011, when he pitched for the Class A-Short Season Tri-City Dust Devils, and the Class A Asheville Tourists within the Colorado Rockies organization.
