= Estadio Nelson Fernández =

Stadium in Cuba

Coordinates: 22°57′50″N 82°8′41″W

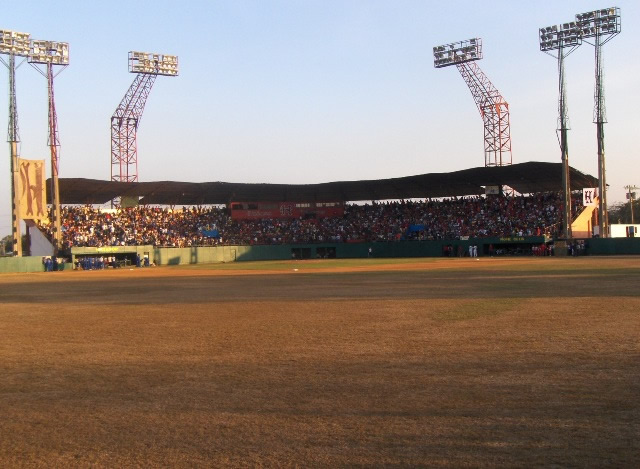
Nelson Fernandez Stadium viewed from its field

Estadio Nelson Fernández is a sports stadium in San José de las Lajas, Mayabeque Province, Cuba. It opened in 1960 and was renovated in 1980. The stadium holds 8,000 people. It is a multi-use stadium but is currently used mostly for baseball games.

Up to 2011 it was the home stadium of the Havana Vaqueros team. Starting from the 2011–2012 series it is the home of the new Mayabeque provincial team "Huracanes" (hurricanes).
