= 2019–20 Cuban National Series =

2019–20 Cuban National Series Serie Nacional de Béisbol 2019–20
- League: Cuban National Series
- Sport: Baseball
- Duration: 10 August – 11 October; 27 October – 25 December
- Number of games: 90
- Number of teams: 16

Regular season
- Best record: Camagüey (53–37)

Postseason
- Finals champions: Matanzas (1st title)
- Runners-up: Camagüey

SNB seasons
- ← 2018–19 2020–21 →

The 2019–20 Cuban National Series was the 59th season of the league. Matanzas defeated Camagüey in the series' final round to capture their first championship.
