= 2018–19 Cuban National Series =

2018–19 Cuban National Series Serie Nacional de Béisbol 2018–19
- League: Cuban National Series
- Sport: Baseball
- Duration: 9 August – 13 October; 26 October – 25 December
- Number of games: 60
- Number of teams: 16

Regular season
- Best record: Las Tunas (34–26)

Postseason
- Finals champions: Las Tunas (1st title)
- Runners-up: Villa Clara

SNB seasons
- ← 2017–18 2019–20 →

The 2018–19 Cuban National Series was the 58th season of the league. Las Tunas defeated Villa Clara in the series' final round to capture their first championship.
