= Huracanes de Mayabeque =

Cuban baseball team

- Logo

Information
- League: Cuban National Series
- Location: San José de las Lajas, Mayabeque Province
- Ballpark: Nelson Fernández Stadium
- Established: 2011; 15 years ago
- Nickname: Huracanes (Hurricanes)
- Colors: Maroon and white
- Manager: Michael González

Current uniforms
Home	Away

Huracanes de Mayabeque (English: Mayabeque Hurricanes) is a Cuban baseball team based in San José de las Lajas. They are a member of the Cuban National Series and play their home games at Nelson Fernández Stadium, opened in 1960 and with a capacity of 3,000 spectators.

== History ==
In 2011, Cuban government decided to split Havana Province into two newly created administrative divisions: Mayabeque Province and Artemisa Province. This led to the disappearance of the La Habana team and to the creation of the Mayabeque and Cazadores de Artemisa teams, who started playing in the 2011–12 Cuban National Series season.

== Roster ==
Huracanes de Mayabeque roster – 2020–21 Cuban National Series
Players		Coaches
Pitchers: 18 Luis Miguel Vázquez; 19 José Betancourt; 20 Yadián Martínez; 21 Darián Alonso; 23 Juan M. Fernández; 25 Mailon Cruz; 28 Assiel Reyes; 42 Jayner Rodríguez; 43 Carlos Pérez; 54 Geyler Gracial; 57 Mario Batista; 63 Alyanser Álvarez; 90 Marlon Vega; 92 Richard Aguilera; 96 Fernando Silveira; 97 Diosvel Nápoles; 98 Randy Suárez; 99 Frank Alfonso	Catchers: 24 Yadián Fumero; 29 Dariel Rodríguez; 40 Javier Carabeo; 41 Luis Michel Ríos; 45 Luis Fernández; Infielders: 1 Jeison Martínez; 3 Yunier Corvo; 6 Yonathan Martínez; 10 Lázaro Martínez; 12 Rangel Ramos; 22 Miguel Camacho; 34 Juan C. Hernández; 35 Rafael Fonseca; 56 Osmel Cordero; Outfielders: 11 Dariel Oliva; 14 Yasniel González; 16 Orlando Lavandera; 17 Alexander Pozo; 27 Dennis Laza; 51 Orlando Capote	Manager: 2 Michael González; Coaches: 4 Enrique Pérez; 9 Michael Izquoierdo; 49 Yanier Fernández; 72 Pedro Díaz; 74 Mario Abreu
