= Cazadores de Artemisa =

- Logo

Information
- League: Cuban National Series
- Location: Artemisa, Artemisa Province
- Ballpark: 26 de Julio Stadium
- Established: 2011; 14 years ago
- Nickname: Cazadores (Hunters)
- Colors: Red, blue and white
- Manager: Manuel Vigoa

Current uniforms
Home	Away

Cazadores de Artemisa (English: Artemisa Hunters) is a Cuban baseball team based in the city of Artemisa, representing the province of the same name. They are a member of the Cuban National Series and play their home games at 26 de Julio Stadium, opened in 1968 and with a capacity of 6,000 spectators.

== History ==
Decades before the formation of the modern Artemisa team, an amateur club by the same name played in the Cuban Amateur League, organized by the Unión Atlética Amateur. This version of Artemisa was managed at one point by León Rojas, and included players such as Francisco Quicutis; Quicutis later managed the team to two Amateur League titles in 1958 and 1959.

In 2011, Cuban government decided to split La Habana Province (not including the City of Havana) into two newly created administrative divisions: Artemisa Province and Mayabeque Province. This led to the disappearance of the La Habana team and to the creation of the Artemisa and Huracanes de Mayabeque teams, who started playing in the 2011–12 Cuban National Series season.

== Roster ==
Cazadores de Artemisa roster – 2020–21 Cuban National Series
Players		Coaches
Pitchers: 14 Geonel Gutiérrez; 16 Misael Villa; 19 Michel Martínez; 26 Israel Sánchez; 28 Yunieski García; 29 Andy Pérez; 42 Miguel Lahera; 44 Sean Rodríguez; 56 Laidel Torres; 74 Michel Ortiz; 75 Saydel Peña; 92 Jesús Daniel García; 97 Dairon Alpízar; 99 José Ángel García	Catchers: 4 Brayan Mera; 12 Andy Cosme; 35 José Padrón; 77 Sandro Tornés; Infielders: 7 Yansel Reyes; 11 Osbel Pacheco; 18 Gabriel Garbey; 22 Adrián González; 24 Dayán García; 30 José Antonio Jiménez; 40 Lian Rodríguez; 66 Yansue Moré; Outfielders: 3 Marlon Lamontaña; 5 Carlos de la Tejeda; 21 Jens Fernández; 25 Yoan Moreno; 27 Geovani Díaz; 36 Reinier Ramos; 55 Henry Luis; 69 Víctor González; 90 Ronmy Proenza	Manager: 40 Manuel Vigoa; Coaches: 3 Lázaro Castro; 5 Eduardo Leal; 62 José Manuel Pedroso; 39 Jorge Luis Crespo; 91 Wilmar Álvarez
