= Avispas de Santiago de Cuba =

- Logo

Information
- League: Cuban National Series
- Location: Santiago de Cuba, Santiago de Cuba Province
- Ballpark: Guillermón Moncada Stadium
- Established: 1977; 49 years ago
- Nickname(s): Avispas, La Aplanadora (Wasps)
- League championships: 8 (1979–80, 1988–89, 1998–99, 1999–00, 2000–01, 2004–05, 2006–07, 2007–08)
- Colors: Red, black and white
- Manager: Eddy Cajigal

Current uniforms
Home	Away

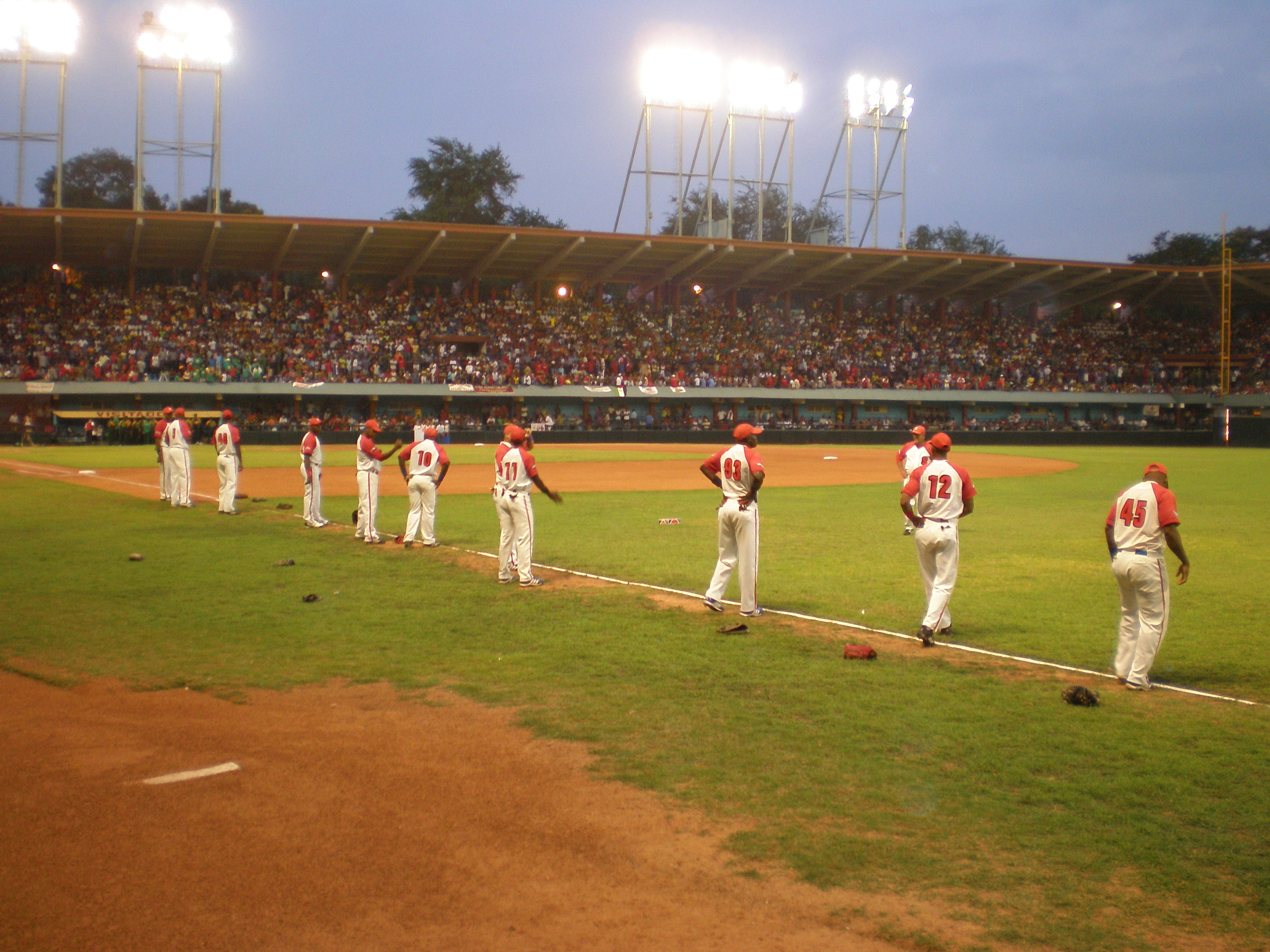
Santiago players in the Guillermón Moncada Stadium

Santiago de Cuba is a baseball team in the Cuban National Series based in Estadio Guillermón Moncada in Santiago de Cuba. Nicknamed the Avispas (Wasps), the team is historically one of the most successful teams in the Cuban National Series, the main domestic competition in post-revolutionary Cuban baseball.

The team has a heated rivalry with Industriales, itself the most successful team of Cuban baseball. The traditional rivalry on the baseball diamond also represents the rivalry between the two cities (Havana and Santiago de Cuba). Meetings in the Cuban National Series between Santiago de Cuba and Industriales are referred to as the Superclasico.

The Avispas have won eight Cuban National Series championships, including three straight titles during the 1998-99, 1999-2000, and 2000-01 seasons, a dynasty known as the Aplanadora Santiaguera ("Santiago Steamroller"). Santiago's latest Cuban National Series championship came in the 2007-2008 season, defeating Pinar del Rio in a 4 game sweep.

== History ==
Santiago de Cuba was formed during the reorganization of the National Series in the 1977–78 season, where teams were restructured along the newly-drawn provincial lines. It replaced the Mineros, Serranos, and Oriente teams, which previously represented the Oriente Province. In its inaugural season, the team finished in a lackluster twelfth place. Two years later, however, it won its first championship, under manager Manuel Miyar. That year, Braudilio Vinent led the league in wins (12) and innings pitched (124.0).

The team won three consecutive championships between 1998 and 2001, becoming the third team, after Industriales and Villa Clara, to do so in the National Series. In the 1999–2000 tournament, the team finished with a 62–28 record (a winning percentage of .689) and won all 11 of their playoff games. During this period, Santiago de Cuba was headlined by Orestes Kindelán (1B) and Antonio Pacheco (2B); the infield was rounded out by utility shortstop Manuel Benavides and third bagger Gabriel Pierre. The outfield was manned by Fausto Álvarez, Rey Isaac, and Ariel Cutiño; at catcher was Rolando Meriño, with the pitching staff anchored by Norge Luis Vera including Ormari Romero, Osmel Cintra, Luis Tissert, and Alexis and Rubén Rodríguez.

== Championships ==
Season	Manager	Record	Series score	Runner-up
1979–80	Manuel Miyar	36–14	—	Villa Clara
1988–89	Higinio Vélez	29–19	–	Industriales
1998–99	Higinio Vélez	46–44	4–3	Industriales
1999–2000	Higinio Vélez	62–28	4–0	Pinar del Río
2000–01	Higinio Vélez	55–35	4–1	Pinar del Río
2004–05	Antonio Pacheco	55–35	4–2	La Habana
2006–07	Antonio Pacheco	57–32	4–2	Industriales
2007–08	Antonio Pacheco	61–29	4–0	Pinar del Río
Total championships			8	

== Roster ==
Avispas de Santiago de Cuba roster – 2020–21 Cuban National Series
Players		Coaches
Pitchers: 16 Virgilio Moroso; 18 José Carlos Barbosa; 21 Wilber Reyna; 25 Carlos Font; 31 Luis Fonseca; 40 Uber Mejías; 45 Yorelquis Hernández; 49 Pedro Portuondo; 53 Yaicel Pérez; 54 Yoandri Montero; 55 Danny Betancourt; 56 Pedro Agüero; 65 Alberto Bicet; 72 Adrián Sagarra; 92 Yosmel Garcés; 99 Yunior Tur	Catchers: 20 Hubert Sánchez; 23 José A. Ferrer; 38 Orelly Ribeaux; 51 Alexander Llanes; Infielders: 1 Adriel Labrada; 2 Emilio Torres; 10 Dasiel Sevilla; 11 Santiago Torres; 12 Marcos Fonseca; 15 Adriel Hechavarría; 17 Edilse Silva; 29 Marlon Serrano; 73 Luis Guzmán; 83 Osday Silva; Outfielders: 3 Rudens Sánchez; 5 William Mustellier; 7 Yoelkis Guibert; 9 José Luis Gutiérrez; 27 Yeri Martínez; 52 Ariel Benavides; 63 Dennis Ala	Manager: 64 Eriberto Rosales; Coaches: 82 Ismael Duarthe; 43 Noidis Díaz; 11 Rey Issac; 29 Alfonso Román; 26 Luis Peña

== Notable players ==
- Ronnier Mustelier

== Honors ==
=== Most Valuable Player ===
- 1988–89: Orestes Kindelán
- 1999–2000: Norge Luis Vera
- 2007–08: Alexeis Bell
- 2022-23: Osday Silva

=== Rookie of the Year ===
- 1989–90: Rubén Rodríguez
