= Cocodrilos de Matanzas =

Baseball team in the Cuban National Series

Logo	Cap insignia

Information
- League: Cuban National Series
- Location: Matanzas, Matanzas Province
- Ballpark: Victoria de Girón Stadium, Palmar de Junco
- Established: 1992; 34 years ago
- Elite League championships: 1 (2023–24)
- National Series titles: 2 (2019–20, 2025–26)
- Colors: Red and gold
- Manager: Armando Ferrer

Current uniforms
Home	Away

The Cocodrilos de Matanzas (English: Matanzas Crocodiles) are a baseball team in the Cuban National Series. Based in Matanzas Province, the Cocodrilos were formed after the dissolution of Henequeneros and Citricultores, two teams from Matanzas. The Cocodrilos have struggled to enjoy the success of their predecessors.

== History ==
Before the Yumurine players wore the Gothic M of Matanzas on their flannels in 1967, the name the city had already adorned the official history of winter tournaments in the mythical campaign of 1878–79.

Like that modest combined at the beginning of the circuit in the nineteenth century, the Matanzas of the 60s and 70s, was not the most competitive. Never, stars of the mood of Wilfredo Sánchez, his brother Fernando, Rigoberto Rosique, Tomás Soto, Evelio Hernández, Edwin Walters, Alfredo García, Gaspar Pérez, Luis Fernández, Ernesto William Alfonso or the brothers Félix and Reinaldo Isasi, could they unify their forces in a single gang to defend the walls of the Athens of Cuba.

And while Matanzas stoically endured his permanence at the bottom of the pond until his total disappearance towards the mid-1970s, Henequeneros, the other squad of the land of crocodiles, adorned his souvenir closet with a trophy in the 1969 campaign -70.

In the early 1990s, the winter series competition system was reorganized for the eighth time. After 19 years of absence, a team reappeared with the name of Matanzas. Although, this second version of the squad in the amateur era was also not very prolific in terms of collective results.

Matanzas won the Cuban National Series championship pennant in 2020, defeating Camagüey in the finals, clinching 4-2 overall in 6 games out of seven.

Matanzas finished sixth in the National Series in 2023. Nevertheless, it qualified to the Cuban Elite League in the first year of its new format, promoting the top six teams from the National Series. Matanzas defeated Cazadores de Artemisa in six games to win its first the Elite League and its second championship after 2020.

== Roster ==
Cocodrilos de Matanzas roster – 2025–26 Cuban National Series
Players		Coaches
Pitchers: 53 (Cuba) Roilán Averohff; 18 (Cuba) Shaiel Cruz; 90 (Cuba) Noelvis Entenza; 6 (Cuba) Armando Dueñas; 15 (Cuba) Yosney García; 39 (Cuba) Luis Hernández; 16 (Cuba) Silvio Iturralde; 36 (Cuba) Yan Carlos Lorenzo; 26 (Cuba) Rubén Menes; 75 (Cuba) Pedro Mesa; 99 (Cuba) Javier Mirabal; 96 (Cuba) Gian Palacio; 98 (Cuba) Haykel Parra; 67 (Cuba) Yamichel Pérez; 82 (Cuba) Denis Quesada; 62 (Cuba) Renner Rivero; 48 (Cuba) Haziel Suárez; 58 (Cuba) Yoennis Yera; 52 (Cuba) Lázaro Zulueta	Catchers: 32 (Cuba) Fernando Hernández; 50 (Cuba) Yoandry Jiménez; 40 (Cuba) Ariel Martínez; 46 (Cuba) Andrys Pérez; 38 (Cuba) George Ponce; Infielders: 44 (Cuba) Rey Charles Chacón; 19 (Cuba) Yariel Duque; 47 (Cuba) Yurisbel Gracial; 45 (Cuba) Juan Manrique Jr.; 11 (Cuba) Juan Martínez; 2 (Cuba) Aníbal Medina; 22 (Cuba) Eduardo Parreira; 10 (Cuba) Adrián Pérez; 13 (Cuba) Luis Ángel Sánchez; Outfielders: 55 (Cuba) Eduardo Blanco; 23 (Cuba) Pavel Gómez; 25 (Cuba) Amaury Noroña; 88 (Cuba) Brayan Peña; 66 (Cuba) José Pren; 31 (Cuba) Dariel Rojo; 72 (Cuba) Esteban Terry; 54 (Cuba) Hanyelo Videt	Manager: 9 (Cuba) Armando Ferrer; Coaches: 46 (Cuba) Eduardo Cárdenas; 45 (Cuba) Juan Manrique; 27 (Cuba) Jonder Martínez (pitching); 14 (Cuba) Frank Sánchez (bench); 39 (Cuba) Ulises Walters (pitching); Roster updated on 14 February 2026

== Team records ==
CNS No	Season	Winner	Runner up	3rd Place	Matanzas	Manager
49	2009-10	Industriales	Villa Clara	Habana	14th	Wilfredo Menendez
50	2010-11	Pinar del Rio	Ciego de Avila	Cienfuegos	14th	Wilfredo Menendez
51	2011-12	Ciego de Avila	Industriales	Matanzas	3rd	Victor Mesa
52	2012-13	Villa Clara	Matanzas	Santi Spiritus	2nd	Victor Mesa
53	2013-14	Pinar del Rio	Matanzas	Industriales	2nd	Victor Mesa
54	2014-15	Ciego de Avila	Isla de la Juventud	Matanzas	3rd	Victor Mesa
55	2015-16	Ciego de Avila	Pinar del Rio	Matanzas	3rd	Victor Mesa
56	2016-17	Granma	Ciego de Avila	Matanzas	3rd	Victor Mesa
57	2017-18	Granma	Las Tunas	Matanzas	3rd	Victor Figueroa
58	2018-19	Las Tunas	Villa Clara	Santi Spiritus	16th	Victor Figueroa
59	2019-20	Matanzas	Camagüey		1st (Series Champion)	Armando Ferrer

== Notable players ==
- Felix Isasi (second baseman)
- Rigoberto Rosique (outfield)
- Wilfredo Sanchez (outfield)
- Jorge Luis Valdez (pitcher)
- Lazaro Junco (outfield)
- Julio German Fernandez (first baseman)
- Juan Manrrique (catcher)
- Jose (pepito) Estrada (outfield)
- Yadiel Hernandez (outfield)
- Yoandry Garlobo (outfield)
- Michel Abreu (first baseman)
- Amaury Casañas (outfield)
- Guillermo Heredia (outfield)

== Achievements ==
=== Awards ===
==== Most Valuable Player ====
- 1996–97 – José Estrada

==== Rookie of the Year ====
- 1968–69 – Armando Sánchez
- 1992–93 – Vaisel Acosta

== See also ==
- Matanzas (Cuban League)
