= Toros de Camagüey =

Cuban professional baseball team

- Logo

Information
- League: Cuban National Series
- Location: Camagüey, Camagüey Province
- Ballpark: Estadio Cándido González
- Established: 1977; 49 years ago
- Nickname: Toros (Bulls)
- Colors: Dark blue, red and white
- Manager: Miguel Borroto

Current uniforms
Home	Away

Toros de Camagüey (English: Camagüey Bulls) is a baseball team in the Cuban National Series based in Camagüey. Formed after the Cuban state redefined its provinces in 1977, the Toros advanced the next season to the league championship series, but fell to Henequeneros. They last won group C in 1997-1998.

== History ==
A professional team from Camagüey had briefly played in the abortive Cuban Federation League of 1946–47. The modern team was established in 1977, but there was another team playing in the Camagüey Province nicknamed the Granjeros (Farmers), who started playing in 1967 and can be considered the Toros predecessor.

Young Camagüey pitcher Vicyohandri Odelín and first baseman/center fielder Leslie Anderson played for Cuba at the 2006 World Baseball Classic.

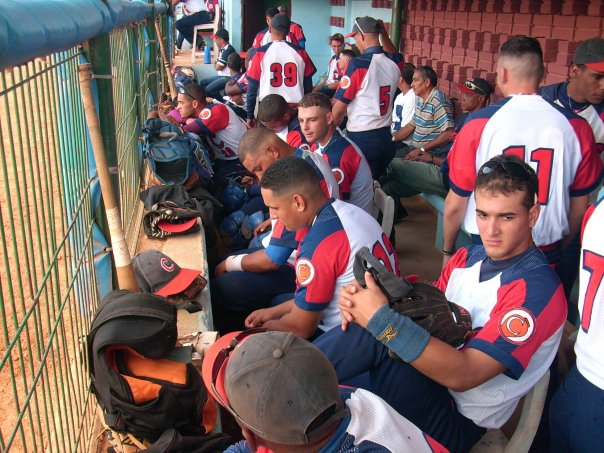
Dugout of Camagüey baseball team at Estadio Cándido González

== Roster ==
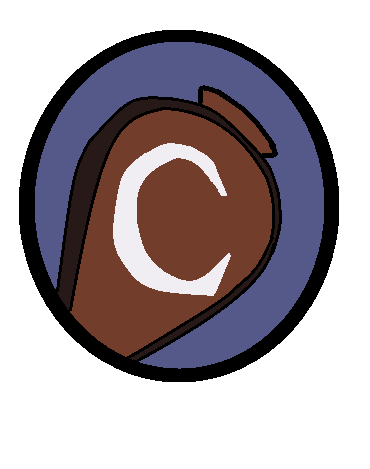
Toros de Camaguey Baseball Club's Logo, The 'Big Jar' was one of the first logos used by any team in the modern post-professional period of the Cuban League, it appeared as an emblem on the uniforms of the Granjeros de Camagüey (Camagüey Farmers) team in the 1965 season.

Toros de Camagüey roster – 2020–21 Cuban National Series
Players		Coaches
Pitchers: 14 Frank Madán; 28 Adrián Pérez; 29 Yariel Rodríguez; 30 Yosimar Cousin; 35 Alejandro León; 37 Juan Ramón Olivera; 44 Juan Sebastián Contreras; 57 Yormani Socarrás; 62 Rodolfo Soris; 64 Lisander Hernández; 65 Marlon Soriano; 73 Sergio Guerra; 76 Yusney Saborit; 83 José Ramón Rodríguez; 90 Damián Leiva; 94 Julio César Martínez; 98 Alexis Mulató	Catchers: 31 Luis Gómez; 45 Yendri Téllez; 49 Jorge Álvarez; Infielders: 4 Alexander Ayala; 7 Humberto Bravo; 8 Yordanis Samón; 11 Eglis Eugellés; 12 Adrián Hernández; 13 Yandy Yanes; 24 Leonel Segura; 52 Marino Luis; 81 Yosbel Pérez; Outfielders: 9 Luis Antonio González; 20 Leonel Moa; 36 Danny Luaces; 51 Jorge Cardosa; 54 Leslie Anderson; 88 Yanmichel Flores; 95 Loidel Chapelli	Manager: 45 Miguel Borroto; Coaches: 4 Felipe Sarduy; 51 Darío Cid; 36 Julián Pipper; 10 René Legón; 99 Pedro Luis Lazo; 75 Rolando Valhuerdi

== Notable players ==
=== Olympic players ===
The following players have represented Cuba at the Summer Olympic Games whilst playing for Camagüey:

- Elier Sánchez (2008)
- Vicyohandri Odelín (2008)

=== World Baseball Classic players ===
The following players have represented Cuba at the World Baseball Classic whilst playing for Camagüey:

- Leslie Anderson (2006, 2009)
- Vicyohandri Odelín (2006)
- Wilber Pérez (2013)
- Alexander Ayala (2017)
- Erly Casanova (2017)
