= Tigres de Ciego de Ávila =

- Logo

Information
- League: Cuban National Series
- Location: Ciego de Ávila, Ciego de Ávila Province
- Ballpark: José Ramón Cepero Stadium
- Established: 1977; 49 years ago
- Nickname(s): Tigres (Tigers); Piñas (Pineapples)
- League championships: 3 (2011–12), (2014–15), (2015–16)
- Colors: Blue, red and white
- Manager: Yorelvis Charles

Current uniforms
Home	Away

Tigres de Ciego de Avila (English: Ciego de Avila Tigers) is a baseball team in the Cuban National Series.

However, in recent seasons, the team has turned their fortunes around, making it to the 2011 Series Nacional final (losing to Pinar del Rio in six games). The following season, the Tigres bounded back to the finals again, this time winning their first ever Series Nacional over perennial favourites Industriales in six games. The Tigres have continued their run of form since, winning back-to-back championships in 2015 and 2016.

Ciego de Ávila placed two players, Roger Machado and Maikel Folch, on the Cuba national team for the 2006 World Baseball Classic.

In the 2013 World Baseball Classic, the Tigres had Vladimir Garcia, Yander Guevara and Rusney Castillo all playing on the Cuba National Team.

== Roster ==
Tigres de Ciego de Ávila roster – 2020–21 Cuban National Series
Players		Coaches
Pitchers: 15 Yorlian Rodríguez; 21 Yosvany Ávalos; 26 Yander Guevara; 27 Osvaldo Cárdenas; 29 Kevin Soto; 30 Fernando Betanzo; 34 Vladimir García; 37 Reinaldo Robaina; 43 Liomil González; 53 Yadir Rangel; 57 Yoikel Maiso; 77 Jasiel Gayón; 90 Sergio Hernández; 93 Dachel Duquesne; 94 Luis Alberto Marrero; 96 Arnaldo Rodríguez	Catchers: 19 William Suárez; 31 Osvaldo Vázquez; 36 Alfredo Fradaga; 84 Jonathan Bridón; Infielders: 4 Michel Arteaga; 6 Liosvany Pérez; 8 Raúl González; 11 José Ramón Alfonso; 12 Ronaldo Castillo; 17 Yaismel Bravo; 35 Yorbis Borroto; 47 Humberto Morales; 86 Rubén Valdés; 88 Jorge Luis Contreras; Outfielders: 13 Yoelvis Fiss; 14 Alexander Jiménez; 22 Dainier Hernández; 24 Yudiel González; 25 Héctor Labrada; 40 Abdel Civil; 73 Reinier Gómez	Manager: 1 Yorelvis Charles; Coaches: 40 Roger Poll; 21 Jorge Luis Domínguez; 39 Ramón Zayas; 32 Juan de Dios Peña; 82 José Eulalio Hernández; 65 Pedro Gayón

== Notable former players ==
- Manuel Álvarez
- Ernesto Baró
- Ángel Castillo
- Rusney Castillo
- Yorelvis Charles
- Yozzen Cuesta
- Yoelvis Fiss
- Maikel Folch
- Adonis García
- Vladimir Garcia
- Ivan González
- Roger Machado
- Julio Mantilla
- Isaac Martínez Dorta
- Alejo O'Reilly
- Roger Poll Soler
- Mario Vega

== See also ==
Team Website - Ciego de Ávila Tigers
