= 2006 World Baseball Classic championship =

Championship round of the 2006 World Baseball Classic

2006 World Baseball Classic Final
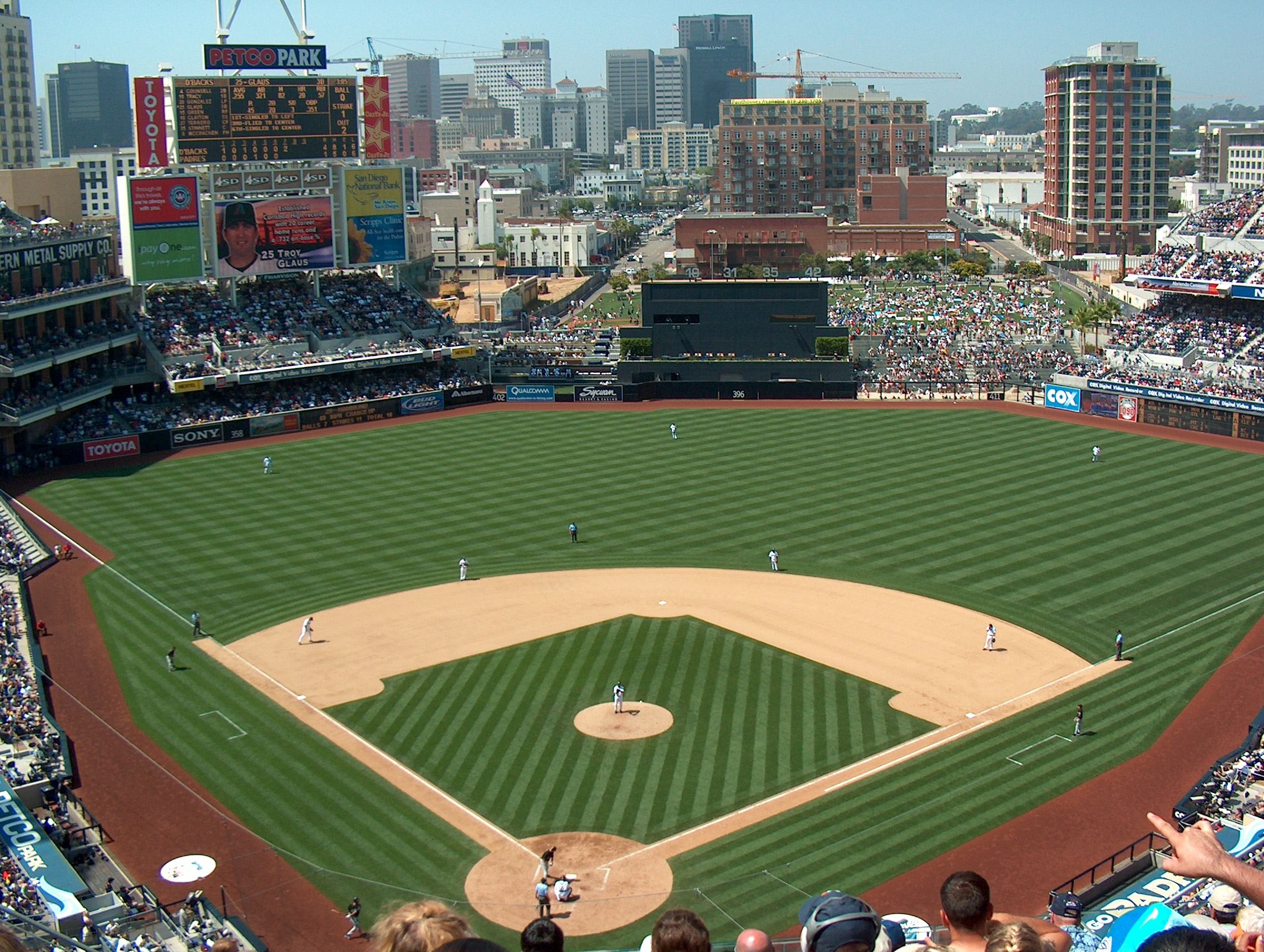
- Petco Park in 2006
Japan	Cuba
(Japan)	(Cuba)
10	6
	1	2	3	4	5	6	7	8	9	R	H	E
Japan	4	0	0	0	2	0	0	0	4	10	10	3
Cuba	1	0	0	0	0	2	0	2	1	6	11	1
- Date: March 20, 2006
- Venue: Petco Park
- City: San Diego, California, U.S.
- Managers: Sadaharu Oh (Japan); Higinio Vélez (Cuba)
- Umpires: HP: (United States) Tom Hallion; 1B: (United States) Bob Davidson; 2B: (United States) Ed Hickox; 3B: (Puerto Rico) Carlos Rey; LF: (Australia) Neil Poulton; RF: (United States) Chris Guccione
- MVP: Daisuke Matsuzaka (Japan)
- Attendance: 42,696
- Time of game: 3:40 p.m. PDT
- Television: Multiple
- Radio: Multiple

The 2006 World Baseball Classic championship was the inaugural final of the World Baseball Classic played on March 20, 2006, at Petco Park in San Diego, California, United States. The best-of-one final was the match to determine the first world champion in baseball. Although this was the first iteration of the World Baseball Classic, both Cuba and Japan were favorites to win the championship, as they were the only countries to have appeared in the top four at every iteration in the Summer Olympics up to this final. Japan won by 4 runs to claim the first championship of the World Baseball Classic.

Both countries had to go through two rounds of group stages and the semi-finals in knockout format to reach the final. Cuba lost only two games, once to Puerto Rico in the first round and once to the Dominican Republic in the second round. However, Japan lost three times, twice to South Korea in each round and the United States in the second round. This sparked a format controversy since South Korea would have a better overall and head-to-head record than Japan by the end of the tournament. As such, Cuba was the favorite to win the final as the team with the higher winning percentage of games in the tournament were to be the home team.

The match began progressing when Japan's starting pitcher–Daisuke Matsuzaka–gave up four hits, five strikeouts and one run by the end of the 4th inning through a gyroball pitching style. Offensively, Japan was able to record 6 runs with the help of Ichiro Suzuki's batting style of contact hitting. Once the Japanese bullpen took the mound in the 6th inning, Cuba aggressively responded for the rest of the baseball game through power hitting. By the end of the eighth, the disparity would come down to one run in favor of Japan from Frederich Cepeda's home run, who would record three runs batted in by the end of the game. In the ninth, Japan would counter by pushing their offensive limit over Cuba's, which would result in a final score of ten to six. The aftermath of the final most notably included notice from Major League Baseball, from Cuba's increase in defection to Matsuzaka's impact for the World Series champion Boston Red Sox in the next year.

== Background ==
=== Format ===
The 2006 World Baseball Classic was the first World Baseball Classic, organized jointly by the International Baseball Federation and Major League Baseball. The competition took place from March 3, 2006, to March 20, 2006, which marks a duration of 18 days. A unique approach to hosting in comparison to global governing bodies of sports such as FIFA, FIBA, and ICC, is that multiple countries can host at each stage in the competition. For this year, Japan, Puerto Rico, and the United States were granted hosting rights, although at different levels. There was no qualification required, and all teams were invited based on merit.

The structure of the tournament required two rounds of round-robin groups and a knockout stage beginning in the semi-finals. The round-robin groups would have the top two teams from each pool to advance to the next round. Outside of determining the home and away team, the next round would not be dependent of the previous one. A total of 39 matches were played in front of over 737,000 people combined. No adjustments were made from the original baseball rules, although teams have to face each other less in comparison to regional competitions like the World Series in North America.

=== Rosters ===
Japan would announce their roster, consisting of twenty-eight competitors from the Nippon Professional Baseball in Japan and two competitors from Major League Baseball in North America. The two representatives from MLB would consist of pitcher Akinori Otsuka from the Texas Rangers and outfielder Ichiro Suzuki from the Seattle Mariners. As for Cuba, all thirty Cubans in their roster came from the Cuban National Series, the professional league only played in Cuba. This is primarily due to the Cuban government having restricted rules for outside work not related to Cuba. If violated, the Cuban government would ban the individuals who broke the rules of working outside the country. Due to these reasons, only 2 MLB representatives were competing in the final, even though tens of MLB players were in different rosters.

== Road to the championship ==
Japan
Round
Cuba
Opponents
Results
First round
Opponents
Results
China
18–2
Match 1
Panama
8–6
Chinese Taipei
14–3
Match 2
Netherlands
11–2
South Korea
2–3
Match 3
Puerto Rico
2–12

Pos	Team	Pld	W	L	RF	RA	RD	PCT	GB	Qualification
1	South Korea	3	3	0	15	3	+12	1.000	—	Advance to second round
2	Japan (H)	3	2	1	34	8	+26	.667	1	Advance to second round
3	Chinese Taipei	3	1	2	15	19	−4	.333	2	
4	China	3	0	3	6	40	−34	.000	3	

(H) Hosts
Final standing

Pos	Team	Pld	W	L	RF	RA	RD	PCT	GB	Qualification
1	Puerto Rico (H)	3	3	0	22	6	+16	1.000	—	Advance to second round
2	Cuba	3	2	1	21	20	+1	.667	1	Advance to second round
3	Netherlands	3	1	2	15	19	−4	.333	2	
4	Panama	3	0	3	7	20	−13	.000	3	

(H) Hosts
Opponents
Results
Second round
Opponents
Results
United States
3–4
Match 1
Venezuela
7–2
Mexico
6–1
Match 2
Dominican Republic
3–7
South Korea
1–2
Match 3
Puerto Rico
4–3

Pos	Team	Pld	W	L	RF	RA	RD	PCT	GB	Qualification
1	South Korea	3	3	0	11	5	+6	1.000	—	Advance to championship round
2	Japan	3	1	2	10	7	+3	.333 (Note: Japan 2.55 RA/9, United States 2.65 RA/9, Mexico 3.50 RA/9)	2	Advance to championship round
3	United States (H)	3	1	2	8	12	−4	.333	2	
4	Mexico	3	1	2	4	9	−5	.333	2	

(H) Hosts
Notes:
Final standing

Pos	Team	Pld	W	L	RF	RA	RD	PCT	GB	Qualification
1	Dominican Republic	3	2	1	10	11	−1	.667 (Note: Dominican Republic defeated Cuba 7–3.)	—	Advance to championship round
2	Cuba	3	2	1	14	12	+2	.667	—	Advance to championship round
3	Venezuela	3	1	2	9	9	0	.333 (Note: Venezuela defeated Puerto Rico 6–0.)	1	
4	Puerto Rico (H)	3	1	2	10	11	−1	.333	1	

(H) Hosts
Notes:
Opponents
Results
Knockout stage
Opponents
Results
South Korea
6–0
Semifinals
Dominican Republic
3–1

=== Round one ===
Japan was drawn into Group A of the first round, and was granted the right to host for this stage. The group featured the strongest teams in East Asia: China, Chinese Taipei, and South Korea. Japan was able to defeat China and Chinese Taipei with ease, outscoring 32 to 5 runs combined. However, Japan would suffer their first loss of the tournament to South Korea, with a slow slump from a 2–0 lead to lose the match 3 runs to 2. As a result, South Korea and Japan advanced to the second round as first and second place finishers in Group A respectively.

Cuba was drawn into Group C of the first round, with fellow Caribbean rival Puerto Rico as host. The group consisted of Panama from Central America along with the Netherlands from Europe–both widely regarded as the best in their respective regions–and the aforementioned Caribbean nations. Cuba had a slightly tougher time in their group, with a 2 run win against Panama and a 9 run rout in favor of Puerto Rico. However, the group did no resort to tiebreakers. As such, Puerto Rico and Cuba advanced to the second round as first and second place finishers in Group C respectively.

Other countries who advanced from the first round were the Dominican Republic, Mexico, the United States, and Venezuela.

=== Round two ===
Japan and South Korea met with the top two finishers of Group B: Mexico and the United States (the host of this pool). Although Japan comfortably defeated Mexico by five runs, the Japanese would struggle against the United States and South Korea at this stage. The match against the United States sparked a controversy regarding a sacrifice fly appeal. The game was highly competitive with consistent back-and-forth leads up to the eighth where the controversy occurred. When Tsuyoshi Nishioka was on third base, he ran to the home plate once the sacrifice fly was hit from Akinori Iwamura. Initially, Japan scored another run to make the score four to three. However, the call was overturned because Nishioka ran earlier than allowed. This led to the United States defeating Japan from Alex Rodriguez's run batted in at the bottom of the ninth. In addition, Japan would lose to South Korea–who would sweep the group–by one run again. Japan, Mexico, and the United States would finish at 1–2 in Pool 1. However, Japan would be declared as the second place finishers due to their amount of runs scored by their opponents and innings pitched.

Group 2 was much less complex, although a tiebreaker was still used. Cuba and Puerto Rico met with the first and second place finishers of Group D: the Dominican Republic and Venezuela. The Cubans would edge host Puerto Rico by 1 run and comfortably defeat Venezuela by 5 runs. However, Cuba would lose to the Dominican Republic by four runs, which would cost them in the tiebreaker. Due to the Dominican Republic losing to Puerto Rico, who would lose to Venezuela, these results would lead to a head-to-head tiebreaker. Since the Dominican Republic and Cuba both finished with two wins and one loss while the other countries did not, they would both advance to the semi-finals. However, since Cuba lost to the Dominican Republic, the Cubans would finish in second place as well in Pool 2.

=== Semifinals ===
The United States was granted the right to host the 2006 World Baseball Classic semifinals and finals, although the Americans did not advance to this level. The stadium that would hold the semifinals and finals is Petco Park in San Diego, home to the San Diego Padres. As a rule in the World Baseball Classic, the team with the higher winning percentage of games in the tournament were to be the home team. If both teams hold a similar winning percentage, a coin flip would occur to determine the home and away team. By this rule, this favored South Korea the most as they had an undefeated record up to this point.

The first semifinal was played on March 18, 2006, at 12:00 p.m. PT that featured the 2nd-seed Dominican Republic and 3rd-seed Cuba. The match was met with frequent hitting from both teams that relied on a power hitting playstyle. Both countries scored a combined total of 20 hits. However, in terms of runs the match was scored in specific innings from both sides, due to the pitching battle and clutch defenses. The Dominican Republic would score one run in the sixth inning, and Cuba would respond with three runs in the seventh inning immediately. This would become the final score, and Cuba would advance to the championship.

The second semifinal was played on March 18, 2006, at 7:00 p.m. PT that consisted of undefeated 1st-seed South Korea and 4th-seed Japan. The match would be instrumental in their sports rivalry, as the winner of this match would reach the final and outplace the loser. Japan would avenge South Korea by overwhelming Korean batting in seven scoreless innings led by pitcher Koji Uehara. However, Japan would offensively struggle up to the 7th inning until Kosuke Fukudome rapidly paced the offense to score five runs in the seventh through his home run. Japan would end up scoring another run in the eighth, and securing a win against South Korea six runs to none. Once the game concluded, a format controversy would be brought up to light as South Korea would finish with the better overall and head-to-head record by the end of the tournament. The impact of this controversy was changing the format in the next edition, as double-elimination would replace round-robin in the first and second round.

== Wind-up ==
News organizations had mixed predictions on who would win the final. On one hand, Japan had more experience in professional baseball, particularly from Major League Baseball and Nippon Professional Baseball whereas Cuba would consider themselves amateurs. On the other, Japan came into the knockouts as a fourth-seed and Cuba has more experience in international baseball, winning 25 of the 39 Baseball World Cups (the former premier global competition in baseball). In addition, first baseman Albert Pujols argued that most of the Cubans could compete in the MLB if they were rightfully given the opportunity to. On top of this, both were the only countries to make top four at all editions in the Summer Olympics, although Cuba would have three gold medals and one silver medal whereas Japan would have two bronze medals and one silver medal up to this point. However, Japan holds a 4–3 record to the final, while Cuba has a 5–2 record. Therefore, by the rules of the World Baseball Classic, Inc., WBCI would declare Cuba as the favorites to win the match due to their overall record in the tournament up to the final.

== Championship ==
=== Summary ===
The final was played on March 20, 2006, at Petco Park in San Diego. This was the third game played at the park in the tournament, after the semi-finals where Japan beat South Korea and Cuba beat the Dominican Republic. The championship was played in front of nearly 43,000 people and began at 3:40 p.m. Pacific Time. Petco Park is widely known for being a pitcher's park, due to the high number of strikeouts and intentional walks likely coming from the marine layer and wind speed. On this day, the temperature recorded as 58 °F (14 °C) with 10 mph in a windy setting. Umpires consisted of Americans Tom Hallion (HP), Bob Davidson (1B), Ed Hickox (2B), Chris Guiccione (RF), Australian Neil Poulton (LF), and Puerto Rican Carlos Rey (3B).

Japan changed their starting pitcher to Daisuke Matsuzaka–one of the pioneers of the Gyroball and owns a diverse arsenal–from Koji Uehara, who earned the win against South Korea. The park effects of Petco Park would prove to be favorable for Matsuzaka and would in turn make Cuba have a hard time batting due to their power batting style. Within the first four innings, Matsuzaka recorded five strikeouts to give the opportunity for the Japanese offense to largen their lead. In the fifth, Ichiro Suzuki hit a double to add two more runs, finishing the first half of the game with a six to one lead. Matsuzaka would exit the game right after this moment, and Cuba would respond aggressively offensively.

"After they changed Matsuzaka, the team came out more aggressive. We said on the bench that if a reliever comes in, we have to come out attacking to cut the lead in the middle of the game."

— Yuli Gurriel, translated from Spanish

A single-base hit made by Yuli Gurriel initiated Cuba's comeback, although Gurriel made the first base through an error by the Japanese defense. Soon after in the sixth inning, Ariel Borrero made first base through an earned hit and Osmani Urrutia would bat in both Gurriel and Borreo to make Japan's lead cut from five to three runs. The seventh inning served as a quiet pitching battle between both teams. However, in the bottom of the eighth inning, Frederich Cepeda would make a home run with a batter on base to cut the disparity to one run in favor of Japan.

Japan would plan a hitting sequence in order to outplay Cuba offensively, as Japan specialized on contact hitting. The Japanese's performance of their fundamentals would show the most from Ichiro Suzuki, who would hit to the very right field and bat in Munenori Kawasaki to make the game seven to five runs. Japan would get on-base frequently throughout the inning, to the extent that the top of the ninth inning would end in ten to five runs. The offense would overwhelm the Cuban offense, as they were only able to score one more run in the bottom, finalizing Japan as the champion with ten to six runs as the score. Matsuzaka would be declared as the most valuable player of the tournament for setting the tone in the beginning of the game, particularly from intimidating the Cuban offense for four innings.

=== Statistics ===
Boxscore

March 20 18:00 PT at Petco Park
Team	1	2	3	4	5	6	7	8	9	R	H	E
Japan	4	0	0	0	2	0	0	0	4	10	10	3
Cuba	1	0	0	0	0	2	0	2	1	6	11	1
WP: Daisuke Matsuzaka (3–0) LP: Ormari Romero (2–1) Sv: Akinori Otsuka (1); Home runs: JPN: None; CUB: Eduardo Paret (1), Frederich Cepeda (1); Attendance: 42,696 (100.6%); Umpires: HP − Tom Hallion, 1B − Bob Davidson, 2B − Ed Hickox, 3B − Carlos Rey, LF − Neil Poulton, RF − Chris Guccione; Boxscore

Top

Japan's Batting
Player	Position	AB	R	H	RBI	BB	SO	LOB	BA
Munenori Kawasaki	SS	5	1	0	0	0	0	1	.259
Shinya Miyamoto	SS (PH)	0	0	0	0	0	0	0	.667
Tsuyoshi Nishioka	2B	4	2	2	0	1	1	0	.355
Ichiro Suzuki	RF	4	3	2	1	1	0	0	.364
Nobuhiko Matsunaka	DH	4	3	3	0	1	1	0	.433
Hitoshi Tamura	LF	3	1	1	2	0	2	1	.259
Kosuke Fukudome	LF (PH)	1	0	1	2	0	0	0	.182
Tomoya Satozaki	C	2	0	0	0	2	1	3	.409
Michihiro Ogasawara	1B	2	0	0	3	1	0	4	.231
Toshiaki Imae	3B	5	0	1	2	0	1	5	.200
Norichika Aoki	CF	2	0	0	0	0	1	2	.200
Tatsuhiko Kinjoh	CF (PH)	2	0	0	0	0	0	0	.200

Cuba's Pitching
Player	IP	H	R	ER	BB	SO	HR	ERA
Ormari Romero	1/3	2	3	3	1	0	0	4.15
Vicyohandry Odelín	1/3	1	1	1	1	1	0	6.48
Norberto González	3 1/3	3	2	2	2	3	0	3.86
Yadier Pedroso	1/3	1	0	0	0	0	0	3.60
Adiel Palma	4	2	4	2	1	3	0	6.14
Yunesky Maya	≈0	1	0	0	0	0	0	0.00
Yulieski González	1/3	0	0	0	0	0	0	0.00
Jonder Martínez	1/3	0	0	0	0	0	0	9.82

Bottom

Cuba's Batting
Player	Position	AB	R	H	RBI	BB	SO	LOB	BA
Eduardo Paret	SS	5	1	2	2	0	2	1	.229
Michel Enríquez	3B	5	0	0	0	0	1	3	.194
Yulieski Gourriel	2B	5	2	1	0	0	1	2	.273
Ariel Borrero	1B	4	1	1	0	0	1	1	.318
Frederich Cepeda	LF	4	1	2	3	0	1	0	.385
Osmani Urrutia	RF	4	0	2	1	0	1	0	.345
Yoandy Garlobo	DH	4	0	1	0	0	0	3	.480
Ariel Pestano	C	4	1	1	0	0	2	1	.194
Alexei Ramírez	CF	4	0	1	0	0	0	1	.375

Japan's Pitching
Player	IP	H	R	ER	BB	SO	HR	ERA
Daisuke Matsuzaka	4	4	1	1	0	5	1	1.38
Shunsuke Watanabe	3	4	3	2	0	2	0	1.98
Soichi Fujita	1/3	1	1	1	0	0	1	9.00
Akinori Otsuka	1 2/3	2	1	1	0	2	0	1.59
