= History of the World Baseball Classic =

Baseball tournament history

The World Baseball Classic is held during the month of March, coinciding with the spring training pre-season for most top-level professional baseball leagues such as Major League Baseball (MLB), Nippon Professional Baseball (NPB) and the Chinese Professional Baseball League (CPBL). Venues are located either in indoor baseball domes or at outdoor baseball stadiums which have mild or moderately warm temperatures during early spring.

== 2006–17 ==
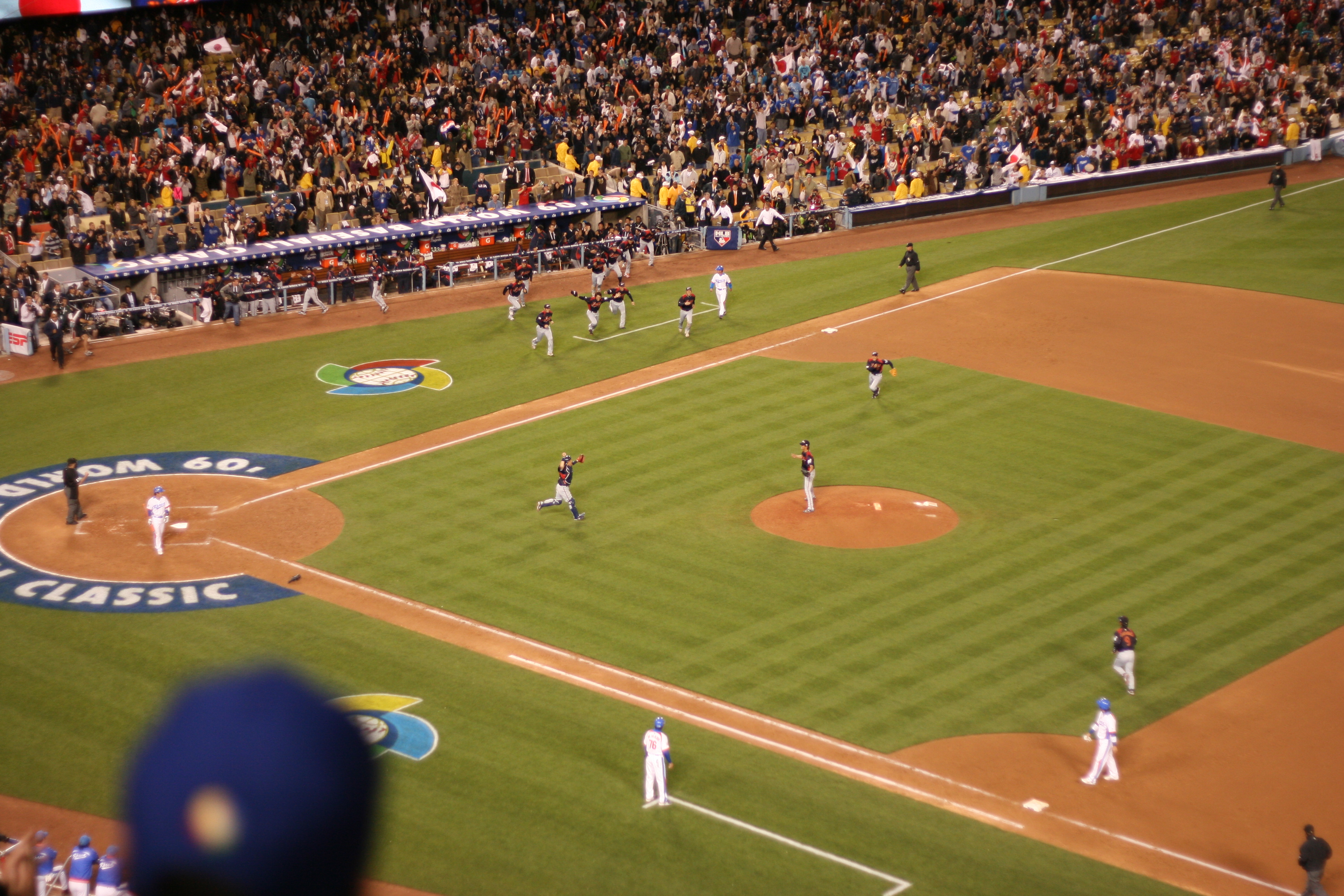
2009 World Baseball Classic finals. Kenji Johjima and Yu Darvish

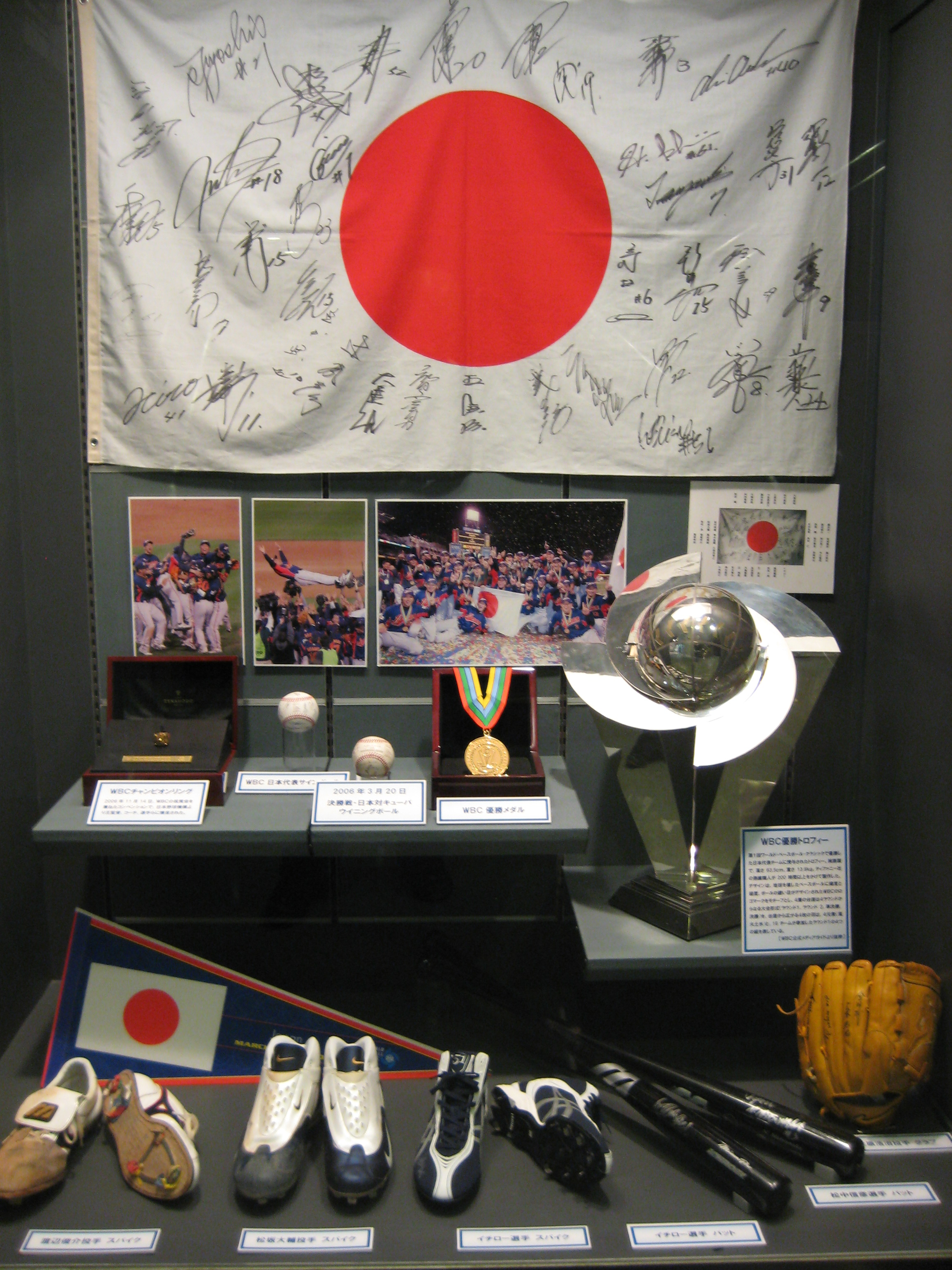
World Baseball Classic Championship Trophy

=== 2006-2009: Japanese dynasty ===
==== 2006 ====
The 16-team field for the inaugural 2006 tournament was pre-selected, featuring the countries judged to be the "best baseball-playing nations" in the world; no qualifying competition was held. The tournament format featured round-robin group play in the first and second rounds, followed by single-elimination semifinals and finals. The first game in WBC history saw South Korea defeat Chinese Taipei 2–0 before a crowd of 5,193 at the Tokyo Dome on March 3, 2006. South Korea went on to advance to the semifinals with a 6–0 record but lost to Japan (a team South Korea had beaten twice in the earlier rounds) for a berth in the final game. Meanwhile, Cuba defeated the Dominican Republic in the other semifinal.

Both countries had to go through two rounds of group stages and the semi-finals in knockout format to reach the final. Cuba lost only two games, once to Puerto Rico in the first round and once to the Dominican Republic in the second round. However, Japan lost three times, twice to South Korea in each round and the United States in the second round. This sparked a format controversy since South Korea would have a better overall and head-to-head record than Japan by the end of the tournament. As such, Cuba was the favorite to win the final. The team with the higher winning percentage of games in the tournament was to be the home team. The match began progressing when Japan's starting pitcher, Daisuke Matsuzaka, gave up four hits, five strikeouts and one run by the end of the 4th inning using a gyroball pitching style. Offensively, Japan scored 6 runs with the help of Ichiro Suzuki's batting style of contact hitting. Once the Japanese bullpen took the mound in the 6th inning, Cuba aggressively responded for the rest of the baseball game, using power hitting. By the end of the eighth, the disparity would come down to one run in favor of Japan from Frederich Cepeda's home run, who would record three runs batted in by the end of the game. In the ninth, Japan would counter by pushing their offensive limit over Cuba's, which would result in a final score of ten to six. The aftermath of the final most notably included notice from MLB, from Cuba's increase in defection to Matsuzaka's impact for the World Series champion Boston Red Sox in the next year.

- Team record 2006: 5 wins – 3 losses, W%- 0.625

==== 2009: Japan's successful defense of their 2006 championship ====
The next iteration of the tournament, taking place in 2009, featured the same 16 teams from 2006. However, the controversial round-robin format from 2006 was replaced by a modified double-elimination format for the first two rounds (the semifinals and final game remained single-elimination). The eight teams advancing from the first round were the same as in 2006, except for a "Cinderella" performance by the Netherlands, which twice defeated the Dominican Republic to reach the second round. In the semifinals, South Korea defeated Venezuela while Japan defeated the United States. South Korea won the coin flip held after the second semifinal between Japan and the United States, designating them as the home team for the final.

Japan drew first blood, scoring on an RBI single by Michihiro Ogasawara in the third inning. Shin-Soo Choo tied the score 1−all with a home run in the fifth inning. With runners on first and third, Hiroyuki Nakajima hit an RBI single to bring Seiichi Uchikawa home to give Japan the lead 2−1. South Korea failed to take advantage of Japanese pitcher Hisashi Iwakuma, who was visibly tired, when they failed to score in the seventh inning, when Iwakuma was relieved by Toshiya Sugiuchi after two outs. Uchikawa hit a single to start the eighth. Atsunori Inaba scored a double to put Uchikawa in scoring position, and Uchikawa scored on Akinori Iwamura's sacrifice fly. Hyun-wook Jong retired the remaining batters to close out the inning.

Japan brought out their closer, Yu Darvish, for the bottom of the ninth with a 3−2 lead. Darvish struck out Keun-woo Jeong, but walked Hyun-soo Kim and Tae-kyun Kim to put South Koreans on first and second with one out. Darvish then struck out Choo and was one out away from saving the game. But Bum-ho Lee singled, driving in Jong-wook Lee for the game-tying run to make it 3−all and send the game into extra innings. Japan batted first, with Chang-yong Lim pitching for South Korea in the tenth. Uchikawa and Iwamura hit a single to put runners on first and third with two out. Ichiro was one strike away from ending the inning when he hit a line-drive single up the middle that scored Iwamura and Uchikawa. Lim then hit Nakajima with a pitch and intentionally walked Norichika Aoki to face Kenji Johjima who was hitless up to that point. Lim was able to strikeout Johjima and send the game to the bottom of the tenth. Darvish made short work of South Korea, capping with a strikeout of Keun-woo Jeong to clinch Japan's successful defense of their 2006 championship.

Pitcher Daisuke Matsuzaka of Japan was awarded the tournament MVP for the second consecutive time, with a 3−0 record and 2.45 ERA.

After the match the team was congratulated immediately for their victory by Japanese prime minister Taro Aso, and South Korean president Lee Myung-bak invited the South Korean team to come and encourage the team.

- Team record 2009: 7 wins – 2 losses, W%- 0.778

=== 2013: "Plátano Power" ===
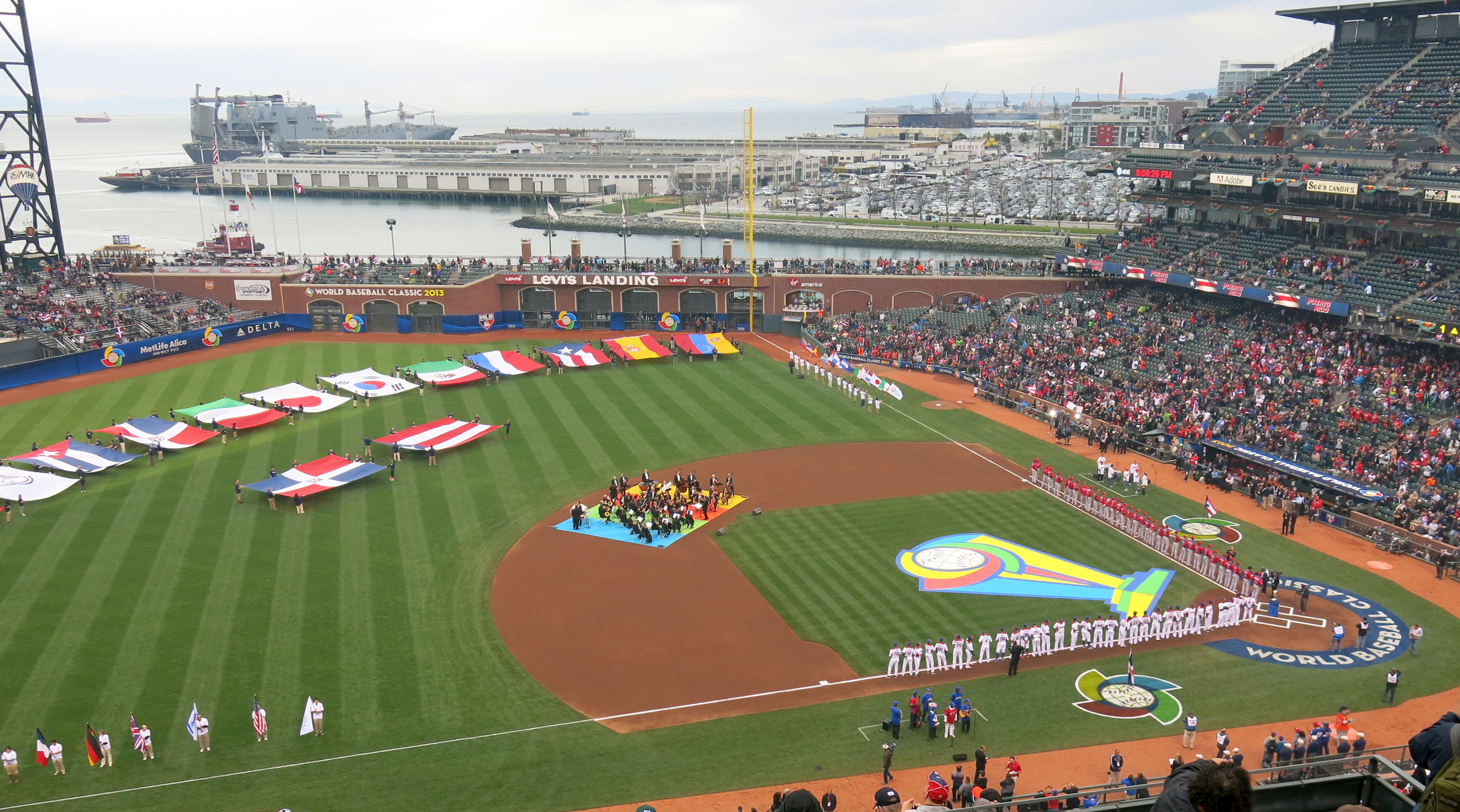
Flags from countries participating in the 2013 World Baseball Classic are shown in a pre-game ceremony on the Championship Game at AT&T Park in San Francisco, CA, USA, on March 19, 2013.

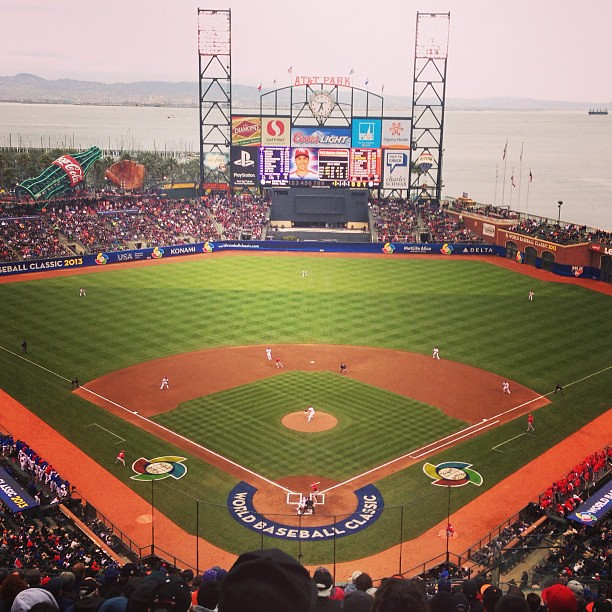
2013 World Baseball Classic championship match between the Dominican Republic and Puerto Rico, March 20, 2013

The buildup to the 2013 tournament included a qualifying round for the first time, with the four lowest finishers from 2009 having to re-qualify against 12 additional teams. This resulted in two new nations making their first appearances in the WBC, as Brazil and Spain respectively replaced Panama and South Africa.

The round-robin format was revived for the tournament's first-round, while the second-round remained double-elimination. in Pool B, South Korea went into the final game needing not only to win (which would cause a three-way tie for the two second-round berths) but to win by at least five runs in order to have a chance of advancing on tiebreakers. Although Chinese Taipei lost its 2−0 lead in Korea's three-run eighth-inning rally, and then lost the game, they emerged as winners of the pool and of the second-round berth since Korea's margin of victory was only one run. Italy was the biggest surprise in the early stages of the tournament, making it to the second round with wins over Canada and Mexico.

The tournament ended in an all-Caribbean championship game, with the Dominican Republic defeating Puerto Rico. In the final, Samuel Deduno started for the Dominican Republic, while Giancarlo Alvarado started for Puerto Rico. 35,703 fans attended the game at AT&T Park in San Francisco. An additional 50,000 Dominican fans watched the game at Estadio Quisqueya in Santo Domingo, Dominican Republic. In Puerto Rico, the final was the most watched sporting event for the past year with nearly 3/4 of all households tuning in.

Edwin Encarnación hit a two-run double in the first inning, giving the Dominican Republic the lead. Erick Aybar had the game's third run batted in for the Dominican Republic. Deduno recorded five strikeouts in five scoreless innings pitched and Fernando Rodney completed the game with a save, his seventh of the tournament. Four Dominican relief pitchers combined for 4 scoreless innings.

This was the third time in the tournament that the Dominican Republic defeated Puerto Rico. The Dominican Republic completed the tournament with an 8–0 record, becoming the first undefeated team to win the WBC. Robinson Canó was named the Most Valuable Player of the Classic after he batted 15-for-32 (.469), the most hits in tournament history.

After the match, the team was congratulated for their victory by Dominican president Danilo Medina.

- Team record 2013: 8 wins–0 losses, win % – 1.000

=== 2017: American redemption ===
The United States won its first WBC championship, defeating Japan and Puerto Rico in the semifinals and finals, respectively. Puerto Rico had been undefeated in the tournament before losing in the final.

The 2017 tournament returned to the format used in 2006, where both the first and second rounds were round-robin, though with the addition of tiebreaker games if needed. Colombia and Israel qualified for the first time, with Israel using a roster mostly of Jewish American players. Prior to the start of the 2017 World Baseball Classic, ESPN considered Israel, ranked 41st in the world, to be the biggest underdog in the tournament, referring to it as the "Jamaican bobsled team of the WBC".

On the other hand, defending champion Dominican Republic extended its WBC winning streak to 11 games, dating to the 2013 tournament, before being eliminated in the second round. Puerto Rico reached the championship undefeated in the tournament, winning all seven games played. Puerto Rico had defeated the United States when they faced each other in Pool F.

In the semi-final Japan reached the semifinals with wins in all six games played in the previous rounds. Tanner Roark started for the United States in the semifinal game, while Tomoyuki Sugano started for Japan. Roark pitched four scoreless innings, while Sugano allowed one run in six innings. The United States scored a run on an RBI single by Andrew McCutchen in the fourth inning, and Ryosuke Kikuchi hit a home run for Japan in the sixth inning to tie the game. The U.S. scored another run in the eighth inning to take the lead, and Luke Gregerson earned the save. Though the Japanese team was considered the strongest defensive team in the WBC, mistakes by Kikuchi at second base and Nobuhiro Matsuda at third base led to each of the United States's runs.

In the championship game, Seth Lugo started for Puerto Rico, and Marcus Stroman started for the United States. Ian Kinsler hit a two-run home run for the United States in the third inning, as Puerto Rico's performance faltered without earning a single run throughout the innings. Kinsler scored again in the fifth inning on a single by Christian Yelich, and Yelich scored on an infield single by McCutchen. Two more runs scored on a bases loaded single by Brandon Crawford in the seventh inning, and Giancarlo Stanton scored the inning's third run with an RBI single. Meanwhile, Stroman did not allow a hit for the first six innings of play. The United States added another run in the eighth inning with an RBI single by McCutchen. The United States completed the shutout to win the championship. Stroman was named the tournament's MVP.

- Team record 2017: 6 wins – 2 losses, W%- 0.750

== 2023–present ==
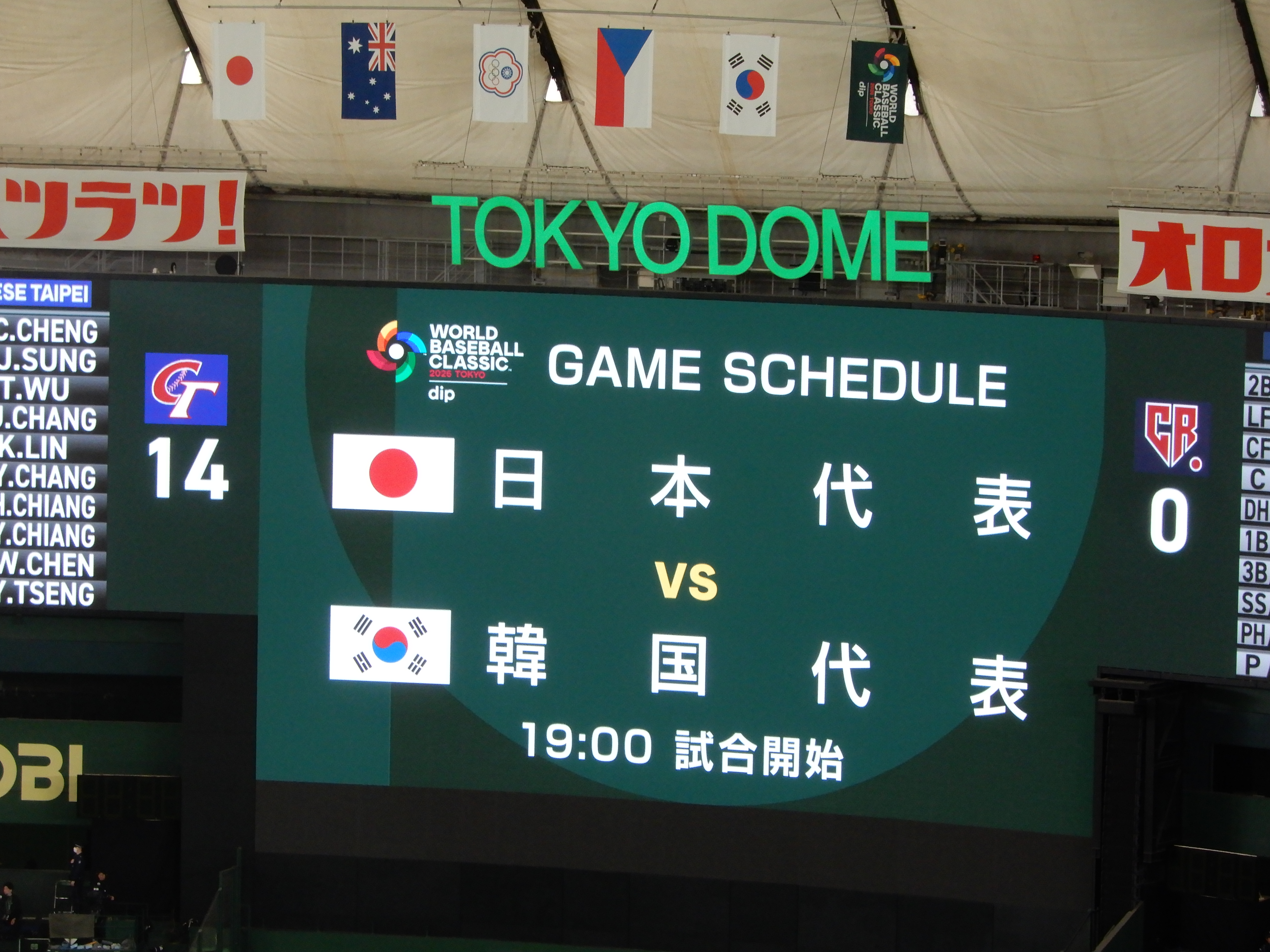
Scoreboard before the Korea vs. Japan game at the 2026 World Baseball Classic.

=== 2023: The Samurai Japan ===
In January 2020, MLB announced that the 2021 WBC would be expanded to 20 teams. The additional four participants would be determined through qualifying tournaments, which were originally planned to take place in March 2020. However, on March 12, MLB announced that the 2021 tournament would be postponed due to the COVID-19 pandemic.

The collective bargaining agreement (CBA) from the 2021–22 Major League Baseball lockout planned for the next WBC to be held in 2023. Qualification for the tournament concluded on October 5, 2022, with Nicaragua claiming the final berth in a victory against Brazil. The competition took place from March 8 to March 21, 2023.

For the 2023 classic, the MLB urged its stars to participate. Mike Trout announced his participation, and others followed, including Trea Turner, Paul Goldschmidt, Nolan Arenado, J.T. Realmuto, Mookie Betts. The Samurai Japan team assembled their own roster, including Shohei Ohtani, Roki Sasaki, Yu Darvish, Masataka Yoshida, Munetaka Murakami, and Yoshinobu Yamamoto.

The United States beat Venezuela to face Cuba in the semifinals. Baseball is Cuba's most popular sport, and is played at a very high level. Therefore, the stakes of the encounter were high. Meanwhile, Japan faced Mexico in the semifinals, who were on a Cinderella run, led by Tampa Bay Rays outfielder Randy Arozarena.

After defeating Cuba in the semifinals by a wide margin, the United States faced Japan in the championship game. The final was incredibly popular in Japan, drawing over 54 million Japanese viewers. Shōta Imanaga started for Japan, while Merrill Kelly started for the U.S.. With a 3–2 lead, two outs, and no runners on base in the bottom of the ninth inning, Japan's Shohei Ohtani, one of the finest pitchers in recent memory, stood on the mound as his Angels teammate Mike Trout, widely considered the greatest player of his generation, stepped up to the plate. After the first pitch of this matchup, Fox Sports commentator Joe Davis reflected on the spectacle, saying,

"As Benji Gil said last night, 'Baseball's already won.'"

The two battled to a full count. Ohtani lured Trout to swing and miss with a slider down and away, sealing the victory for Japan.

After the match, Japan was congratulated for their victory by Japanese prime minister Fumio Kishida. They became the second team to win the WBC without losing a single game the entire tournament, joining the Dominican Republic in 2013.

- Team record 2023: 7 wins–0 losses, win % – 1.000

=== 2026: New heights and Venezuela first title ===
The event proved to be quite popular, however, providing many memorable moments including a first-round game between Venezuela and the Dominican Republic.

Before the championship game of the 2023 tournament, MLB commissioner Rob Manfred announced that the next WBC would be held in 2026. Sixteen teams qualified by making the top four of their four respective pools during the 2023 tournament. The other four participants, Nicaragua, Chinese Taipei, Colombia, and Brazil were determined through a qualifying tournament in March 2025. In May 2024, it was announced that the pool play rounds will be played in Miami, Florida; Houston, Texas; San Juan, Puerto Rico; and Tokyo, Japan. The quarterfinals will be split between Miami and Houston, and the final round will be played in Miami.

Venezuela had landslide victories over Japan and Italy in the quarterfinal and semifinal and won this year's World Baseball Classic tournament, beating the United States 3–2 in the championship game, with Eugenio Suarez hitting a go-ahead double in the top of the 9th to clinch their first title. It was the first major international sporting competition won by Venezuela since the 1945 Amateur World Series, and the second time in Latin America. Maikel García of Venezuela was named the MVP of the tournament.

The tournament has hit new high levels in attendance and US Television viewership: the 2023 attendance record was broken before the pool play was ended, and US viewership of the final hit 10 million viewers for the first time ever.

- Team record 2026: 6 wins – 1 losses, W%- 0.857
