= José Abreu =

Cuban-born baseball player (born 1987)

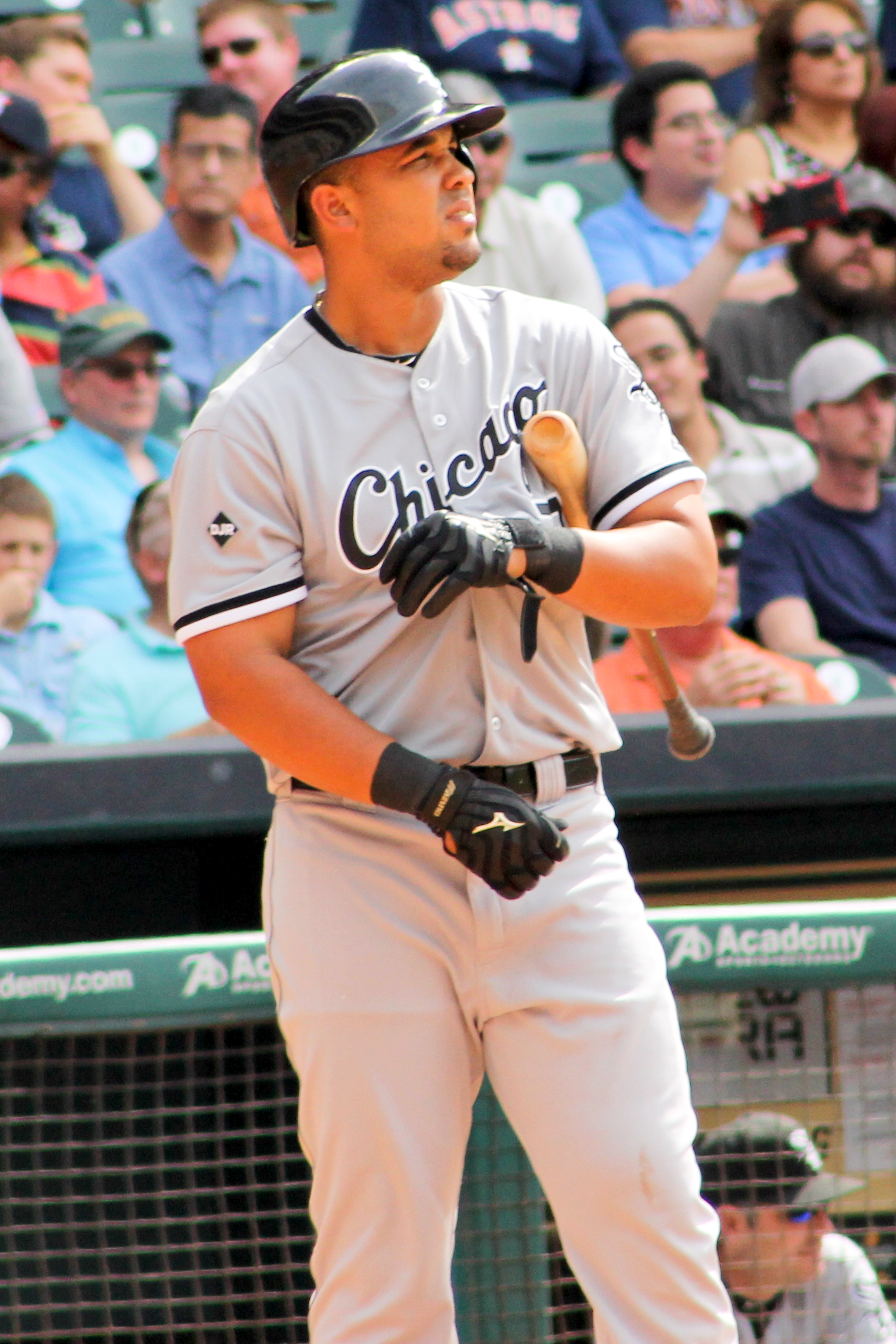
- Abreu with the Chicago White Sox in 2014
- First baseman
- Born: January 29, 1987 (age 39); Cruces, Cuba
- Batted: Right Threw: Right

MLB debut
- March 31, 2014, for the Chicago White Sox

Last MLB appearance
- June 12, 2024, for the Houston Astros

MLB statistics
- Batting average: .283
- Home runs: 263
- Runs batted in: 960
- Stats at Baseball Reference

Teams
- Chicago White Sox (2014–2022); Houston Astros (2023–2024)

Career highlights and awards
- 3× All-Star (2014, 2018, 2019); AL MVP (2020); AL Rookie of the Year (2014); 3× Silver Slugger Award (2014, 2018, 2020); AL Hank Aaron Award (2020); 2× AL RBI leader (2019, 2020)
Medals
Men's baseball
Representing Cuba
Baseball World Cup
Silver medal – second place	2009 Nettuno	Team
Intercontinental Cup
Gold medal – first place	2010 Taichung	Team
World Port Tournament
Gold medal – first place	2013 Rotterdam	Team

José Dariel Abreu Correa (born January 29, 1987) is a Cuban-born former professional baseball first baseman. He played in Major League Baseball (MLB) for the Chicago White Sox and Houston Astros.

Abreu played in the Cuban National Series for Cienfuegos before his defection from Cuba in August 2013. After being granted free agency by MLB, Abreu signed with the White Sox in October 2013. Abreu won the AL Rookie of the Year Award in 2014, the Silver Slugger Award in 2014, 2018, and 2020, and the American League's Most Valuable Player Award in 2020. He led the American League in runs batted in in 2019 and 2020. He signed with the Astros before the 2023 season and was released in 2024.

== Professional career ==
=== Cuban career ===
Abreu set a Cuban home run record in 2010–2011 and was named league MVP. He had played five seasons in the Cuban Serie Nacional through 2007–2008, hitting .295 and slugging .467. After 48 games in 2008–2009, he was batting .345/.368/.600, earning the infielder a spot on Cuba's provisional roster for the 2009 World Baseball Classic. He did not make the final cut and finished the season with a .346/.441/.630 batting line. He led the 2008-09 Cuban National Series with 30 times hit by pitch. He tied Yenier Bello and Alex Guerrero for 8th in homers (19), was eighth in slugging and fourth in strikeouts (69).

Abreu was 2-for-10 in the 2009 World Port Tournament, backing up Ariel Borrero at first base. In the 2009 Baseball World Cup, he hit .250/.333/.469 in his first major tournament. He was listed in the IBAF's Final Report as being one of the All-Star outfielders alongside teammate Alfredo Despaigne and Jon Weber, but other sources list Puerto Rico's Miguel Abreu, who had better statistics. He was not even used as a starter in the outfield, playing alongside Ariel Borrero at first. In the gold medal game, he did not appear as Borrero saw the action.

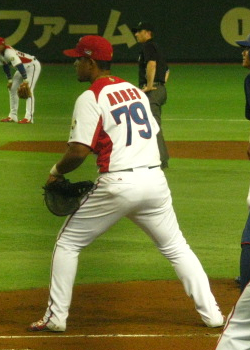
Abreu in the 2013 World Baseball Classic

In 2009–2010, Abreu produced his best year to date, hitting .400/.555/.822 with 82 runs, 30 homers, 76 RBI and 74 walks to 49 strikeouts in 89 games. He tied Leonys Martín for 6th in the Serie Nacional in runs, tied for third with 25 doubles, tied Yuli Gurriel for second in home runs (one behind Alfredo Despaigne in a to-the-wire home run race), was third with 235 total bases (behind Despaigne and Gourriel), again led with 30 times hit by pitch, tied Enrique Esteban Díaz for 4th in walks, led with 32 intentional walks (12 more than runner-up Yosvany Peraza), was second in average (.005 behind Despaigne), led in slugging (.008 over Despaigne) and probably led in OBP. He was named the All-Star first baseman.

Abreu was Cuba's starting first baseman when they won the 2010 Intercontinental Cup, their first Gold in an international tournament in three years. He hit .292/.320/.500. In the finale, he went 1-for-3 and scored the first run in the victory over the Dutch national baseball team; he doubled off Rob Cordemans in the third and came home on a Yorbis Borroto hit. He helped Cuba finish second at the 2010 Pan American Games Qualifying Tournament. In the 2010 World University Baseball Championship, he posted the best average by going 10-for-18 with two walks, a double, triple, four homers, nine runs and 12 RBI in six games as Cuba won the Gold. He was 0-for-4 in the finale, as Cuba edged Team USA. He was named the event's All-Star 1B.

Abreu continued to improve in 2010–11 with one of the greatest seasons in Cuban history. Over 66 games, he hit .453/.597/.986 with 79 runs, 93 RBI and 33 home runs. Despite missing 23 games due to bursitis in his shoulder, he broke Despaigne's home run record (as did Yoenis Céspedes—both hit their 33rd on the season's last day). Despaigne would reclaim the record a year later. Abreu led the league in average (.052 over Michel Enríquez), slugging (by .212 over runner-up Frederich Cepeda), intentional walks (21) and homers (tied with Yoenis Céspedes), was second in RBI (6 behind Céspedes), tied for eighth in runs with Donal Duarte, seventh in total bases (209) and fourth in times hit by pitch (21). Had he not been injured, he would have likely easily won a Triple Crown. He won Cuban National Series Most Valuable Player Award, the second MVP from Cienfuegos, following Pedro José Rodríguez Sr., by 31 years.

Abreu was part of the Cuba national team at the 2013 World Baseball Classic (WBC). In Cuba's six games, he batted .383 and hit three home runs while recording nine RBIs.

=== Defection from Cuba ===
In August 2013, rumors began circulating online that Abreu had defected from Cuba to pursue an MLB career. Abreu's defection was later confirmed by former teammate Henry Urrutia. Abreu established residency in Haiti and trained in the Dominican Republic, where Urrutia's agents planned to showcase him.

Abreu later told the Chicago Tribune that he decided to defect while playing in the 2013 World Baseball Classic in March.

=== Chicago White Sox ===
In October 2013, he signed a six-year contract with the Chicago White Sox worth $68 million. On the White Sox, Abreu joined fellow Cuban players Alexei Ramírez, Dayán Viciedo, and Rule 5 draft pick Adrian Nieto.

==== 2014: AL Rookie of the Year ====
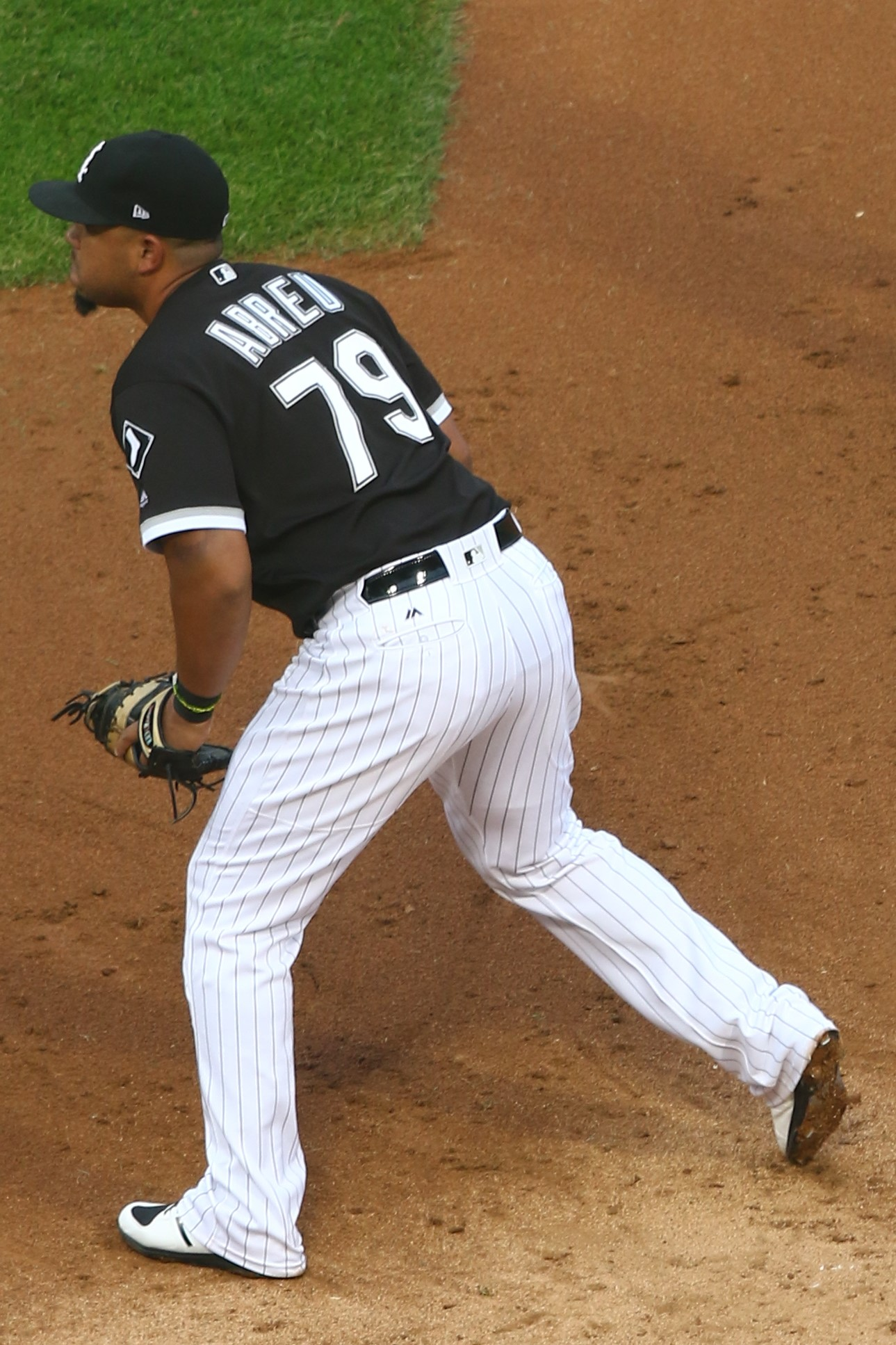
Abreu with the White Sox in 2017

Abreu recorded his first major league hit on March 31, 2014, against the Minnesota Twins. On April 8, 2014, Abreu hit the first two home runs of his career in a game at Coors Field, helping his team to defeat the Colorado Rockies, 15–3. On April 25, 2014, he captured his eighth home run of the year off Chris Archer, tying the rookie record for homers in March–April. Later that night, Abreu recorded his third multi-homer game with a walk-off grand slam versus Tampa Bay Rays pitcher Grant Balfour giving him nine homers in his first month in the Major Leagues, surpassing the record of eight shared by Albert Pujols (2001), Carlos Delgado (1994), and Kent Hrbek (1982). Two days later, Abreu broke the rookie record for RBI in the month of April with 31, and extended the April rookie home run record to 10. For his performance, Abreu was awarded a share of the AL Player of the Week Award for April 21–27 along with Seattle Mariners' third baseman Kyle Seager. During this week, Abreu batted .310 with 5 home runs, 14 RBI and an .862 slugging percentage .

On May 18, Abreu was placed on the 15-day disabled list (DL) with tendinitis in his left ankle. On June 2, Abreu returned from the DL to face the Los Angeles Dodgers. In the second at bat after his return, Abreu hit a two-run home run off Dodgers ace Clayton Kershaw.

On July 6, Abreu was selected to the MLB All-Star Game along with teammates Alexei Ramírez and Chris Sale. At the All-Star Break, Abreu had a .292 batting average with 73 RBIs and an MLB-leading 29 home runs. Abreu was named both the American League (AL) Player of the Month and AL Rookie of the Month for April and July, becoming the first player to win both awards in the same month twice in one season. Having won the rookie honor in June, Abreu became only the fourth player to win the Rookie of the Month honor three or more times in a season.

Abreu finished the season with a club rookie record 36 home runs. He won the 2014 Sporting News AL Rookie of the Year Award. He was awarded the AL Silver Slugger Award for first basemen, becoming the only White Sox first baseman besides Frank Thomas to ever gain the honor. Abreu was unanimously named the 2014 AL Rookie of the Year by the BBWAA on November 10, 2014.

==== 2015–2018 ====
In 2015, Abreu batted .290/.347/.502 with 30 home runs and 101 RBIs in 154 games. His .502 slugging percentage and 67 extra-base hits both ranked tenth in the American League. Abreu batted .293/.353/.468 with 25 home runs and 100 RBIs for the White Sox in 2016.

On September 9, 2017, Abreu hit for the cycle against the San Francisco Giants, becoming the first White Sox player to hit for the cycle since José Valentín on April 27, 2000. In 2017, Abreu held many of the top 20 ranks within MLB, 8th in MLB for batting average, batting .304 for the season, and led the league in total bases. He created a total of 116 runs throughout the season, placing him at fifth in the American League. He was third in the league for triples, hitting 6 over the course of the regular season, and had 82 total extra base hits, making him second in the league.

In 2018, Abreu again was selected to play in the 2018 All-Star Game as part of the American League team as a first baseman. After the 2018 season, he was also awarded his second Silver Slugger Award for first basemen. He batted .265/.325/.473 in 2018, each the lowest figure of his Major League Baseball career.

==== 2019 ====
In 2019, Abreu batted .284/.330/.503 with 33 home runs and led the American League in RBIs (123) and sacrifice flies (10), and led the major leagues in grounding into double plays (24). On defense, he had a −4 Defensive Runs Saved (DRS) rating, the lowest in the American League among first basemen.

On November 14, 2019, Abreu agreed to the White Sox's qualifying offer of a one-year, $17.8 million contract. On November 22, Abreu signed a three-year contract with the White Sox worth $50 million, superseding his previously accepted qualifying offer.

==== 2020: AL MVP ====
On August 22 and 23, 2020, against the Chicago Cubs, Abreu tied an MLB record by hitting a home run in four straight at-bats. Abreu hit 3 home runs in his 3 at-bats on August 22 off Kyle Hendricks, Rowan Wick, and Duane Underwood Jr. Abreu followed up the next day with a home run in his first at-bat off Yu Darvish. Overall, Abreu batted .317/.370/.617, equaling a career high in batting average while setting a new career best for slugging percentage, which led the American League. Abreu also led the AL in RBIs (60), games played (60), hits (76), extra base hits (34), total bases (148), double plays grounded into (10; leading the league for the second consecutive year), and errors by a first baseman (5). He also finished in the top 10 in home runs (19, 2nd) and doubles (15, 9th). Abreu's strong season helped to lead the White Sox to their first postseason berth since 2008. In Game 1 of the AL Wild Card Series against the Oakland Athletics, Abreu hit his first postseason home run in his second at-bat off Jesus Luzardo. The Sox would win the game 4–1 but lost the next 2 games which eliminated them. For his efforts during the regular season, Abreu was named the AL MVP, becoming the first White Sox player to win the award since Frank Thomas in 1994. Abreu also became the fourth different White Sox player to win AL MVP joining Thomas, Dick Allen, and Nellie Fox.

==== 2021 ====
In 2021, Abreu tested positive for COVID-19 after arriving at spring training. His first practice with the White Sox was on February 27, five days after their first full-squad workout.

On April 14, 2021, in a game against the Cleveland Indians in top of the 9th inning, Abreu made a play at first base and was credited with saving a no-hitter for Carlos Rodon. Abreu picked up a ground ball that hit off of Josh Naylor and with Naylor sprinting as fast as he could to first base, Abreu stretched his right foot out like he was a baserunner sliding to the bag. Abreu's foot touched the base just before Naylor reached it with his headfirst slide attempt. On May 14, 2021, Abreu was involved in a collision at the first base line with Kansas City Royals batter-runner Hunter Dozier during the first game of a doubleheader. Neither of them played in the second game of the doubleheader, but Abreu returned to play on the following day. On May 16, Abreu scored a walk-off run on a wild pitch by Kansas City Royals pitcher Wade Davis. On August 12, 2021, in a game played at the MLB at Field of Dreams site in Dyersville, Iowa, Abreu hit the first ever official Major League home run to be connected in Iowa off Andrew Heaney. Despite putting up big numbers in 2021, it actually represented a step backwards for Abreu. He hit 30 home runs and drove in 117 RBIs during the season, and had an OPS+ of 124 in 152 games, a dropoff from his scorching 165 OPS+ of 2020. He was also hit 22 times by pitches. He grounded into 28 double plays, more than any other major leaguer.

==== 2022 ====
Abreu's 2022 season was much better in terms of batting average than his 2021 season, as he batted .304/.378/.446 with a 133 OPS+ and 4.2 WAR in 157 games. However, he had a significant decrease in power, hitting only 15 home runs and driving in 75 runs.

=== Houston Astros ===
On November 28, 2022, Abreu signed a three-year, $58.5 million contract with the Houston Astros. He replaced fellow Cuban defector Yuli Gurriel at first base. He singled on Opening Day versus the White Sox to secure his first base hit as member of the Astros, the start of a 10-game hitting streak to open the season. On May 28, 2023, Abreu hit a home run at the Oakland Coliseum versus the Athletics for his first home run of the season and first as an Astro, ending a home run drought of 260 at bats, the longest of his career. Abreu obtained his 1,500th career hit on June 13, 2023, a second-inning double off Patrick Corbin of the Washington Nationals at Minute Maid Park. Abreu homered for the 250th of his career on July 3, hit versus Glenn Otto of the Texas Rangers.

The Astros placed Abreu on the 10-day injured list (IL) on August 12, 2023, due to lower back discomfort, and reactivated him on August 23 versus the Boston Red Sox. In the finale of a series versus Texas on September 6, 2023, Abreu hit a grand slam off Max Scherzer and later hit a three-run home run to lead a 12–3 win. The seven RBI tied a career high; it was his both his first grand slam and multi-homer game as an Astro, and he totaled 11 RBI in the series. During the first two games of the final regular-season series versus Arizona Diamondbacks, Abreu had pivotal RBI doubles, driving in all three runs of both games decided by 2–1 and 1–0 scores, which proved instrumental in the Astros clinching a seventh consecutive postseason appearance. In 26 September games, Abreu batted .237/.299/.536 with eight home runs and 28 RBI. For the 2023 season, Abreu appeared in 141 games and hit .237/.296/.383 with 18 home runs and 90 RBI. It was the seventh time in his career he had reached 90 RBI. With the bases empty, Abreu garnered 311 total plate appearances, hitting .207/.261/.303 with 5 doubles and 7 home runs. With runners on base, he hit .272/.336/.476 with 11 home runs, 18 doubles, and 83 RBI in 283 plate appearances.

Abreu hit three home runs and eight RBI in the American League Division Series (ALDS), including a two-run home run in Game 4 that was the game-winning RBI to win versus Minnesota and clinch the series. The Astros advanced to, and extended their record, seventh-straight American League Championship Series (ALCS).

Abreu began the 2024 season batting .099 over 77 plate appearances with three RBIs. On April 30, 2024, Abreu was optioned to the Florida Complex League Astros to help with his swing. He returned to the big league club on May 27. His play did not improve, however, leading to the Astros releasing him on June 14. Astros general manager Dana Brown said: “Ultimately, Abreu is an outstanding human being. He’s had an outstanding career. We tried different things to get him going, like sending him down. As we talked through the process this week, we felt like it was time to make a change.” For the season he hit .124/.167/.195 with 2 home runs and 7 RBI in 35 games and posted a −1.6 WAR, by far the lowest of his career.

=== San Juan Senadores ===
Following the 2024 season, Abreu signed with the Senadores de San Juan to play winter league baseball in the Liga de Béisbol Profesional Roberto Clemente.

== Personal life ==
Abreu wears #79, an unusually high uniform number. His mother, Daysi Correa, chose the number so that people would remember it. Abreu's mother and the rest of his extended family remained in Cuba until his parents moved to the United States in May 2014. The 2014 MLB All-Star Game was the first game in which his parents saw him play since leaving Cuba.

After he left Cuba in 2013, his son, Dariel (born 2010) stayed behind in Cuba with his mother and was not allowed to visit the U.S. until August 2016. Dariel's face and birthdate are tattooed on Abreu's left arm. His wife, Yusmari, gave birth to Josué Dariel Abreu Hernández in October 2017.

In 2015, he launched Abreu's Amigos, his philanthropic program that supports children with special needs.

Throughout his career, Abreu developed a reputation as a positive clubhouse presence, a hard worker, and a popular figure among players across the league.

== See also ==
- List of baseball players who defected from Cuba
- List of Chicago White Sox award winners and league leaders
- List of current Major League Baseball players by nationality
- List of Major League Baseball annual putouts leaders
- List of Major League Baseball career slugging percentage leaders
- List of Major League Baseball players from Cuba
- List of Major League Baseball players to hit for the cycle

Awards and achievements
Preceded by Josh Donaldson; Mike Trout; Austin Meadows; Shohei Ohtani	American League Player of the Month; April 2014; July 2014; August 2020; August 2021	Succeeded by Edwin Encarnación; José Ramírez; Víctor Martínez; Kyle Tucker
Preceded by Evan Longoria	Hitting for the cycle September 9, 2017	Succeeded by Mookie Betts
Preceded by Alfredo Despaigne	Cuban National Series MVP; 2010–11	Succeeded by Alfredo Despaigne
