= Shuuto =

Type of baseball pitch popular among right-handed Japanese pitchers

The shuuto (シュート) or shootball is a baseball pitch. It is commonly thrown by right-handed Japanese pitchers such as Hiroki Kuroda, Noboru Akiyama, Kenjiro Kawasaki, Daisuke Matsuzaka, Yu Darvish and Masumi Kuwata. The most renowned shuuto pitcher in history was Masaji Hiramatsu, whose famous pitch was dubbed the razor shuuto because it seemed to "cut the air" when thrown.

The pitch is mainly designed to break down and in on right-handed batters, to prevent them from making solid contact with the ball. It can be thrown to left-handers to keep them off balance. Good shuuto pitches often break the bats of right-handed hitters because they get jammed when trying to swing at this pitch. It could be said that the shuuto has a somewhat similar break and purpose as the screwball. If the shuuto was thrown off the outside part of the plate, it would tail back over the outside border of the strike zone. Conversely, if it was thrown on the inside part of the plate, it would move even further inside.

The shuuto is often described in English as a reverse slider, but this is not strictly the case. The shuuto generally has more velocity and less break than a slider. The two-seam fastball, the sinker, and the screwball, in differing degrees, move down and in towards a right-handed batter when thrown, or in the opposite manner of a curveball and a slider.

The shuuto is often confused with the gyroball, perhaps because of an article by Will Carroll that erroneously equated the two pitches. Although Carroll later corrected himself, the confusion persists.

According to baseball analyst Mike Fast, the shuuto "can describe any pitch that tails to the pitcher's arm side, including the two-seam fastball, the circle change-up, the screwball, and the split-finger fastball".

== Popular culture ==
The shuuto is mentioned in the 1992 film Mr. Baseball. This is the type of pitch that Tom Selleck's character is continually unable to hit, even though he is a left-handed batter. The shuuto is described as "the great equalizer".

== Etymology ==
In the third edition of The Dickson Baseball Dictionary, "shoot" is explained as:

Shoot 【noun / obsolete】 A kind of thoroughly changing pitching. It was a term used from the 19th century to the beginning of the 20th century and it was called as a curve or a variant thereof because the sphere moved "in a certain direction" ("roughly").

== Japan and the United States ==
Many Japanese pitchers utilize the pitching style of the shot due to the varying results of the ball twisting or sinking in flight. This is done in an attempt to outwit the batter and cause them to either miss the ball when swinging or increase the chance of a foul ball or easily fielded ball. A shot is more difficult to hit compared to a straight pitch because the batter must compensate for the eccentric movement of the ball between the time the ball leaves the pitcher’s hand and crosses home plate. American baseball utilizes terms such as slider, screwball, breaking ball, changeup or knuckleball instead of the Japanese term.

== Technique ==
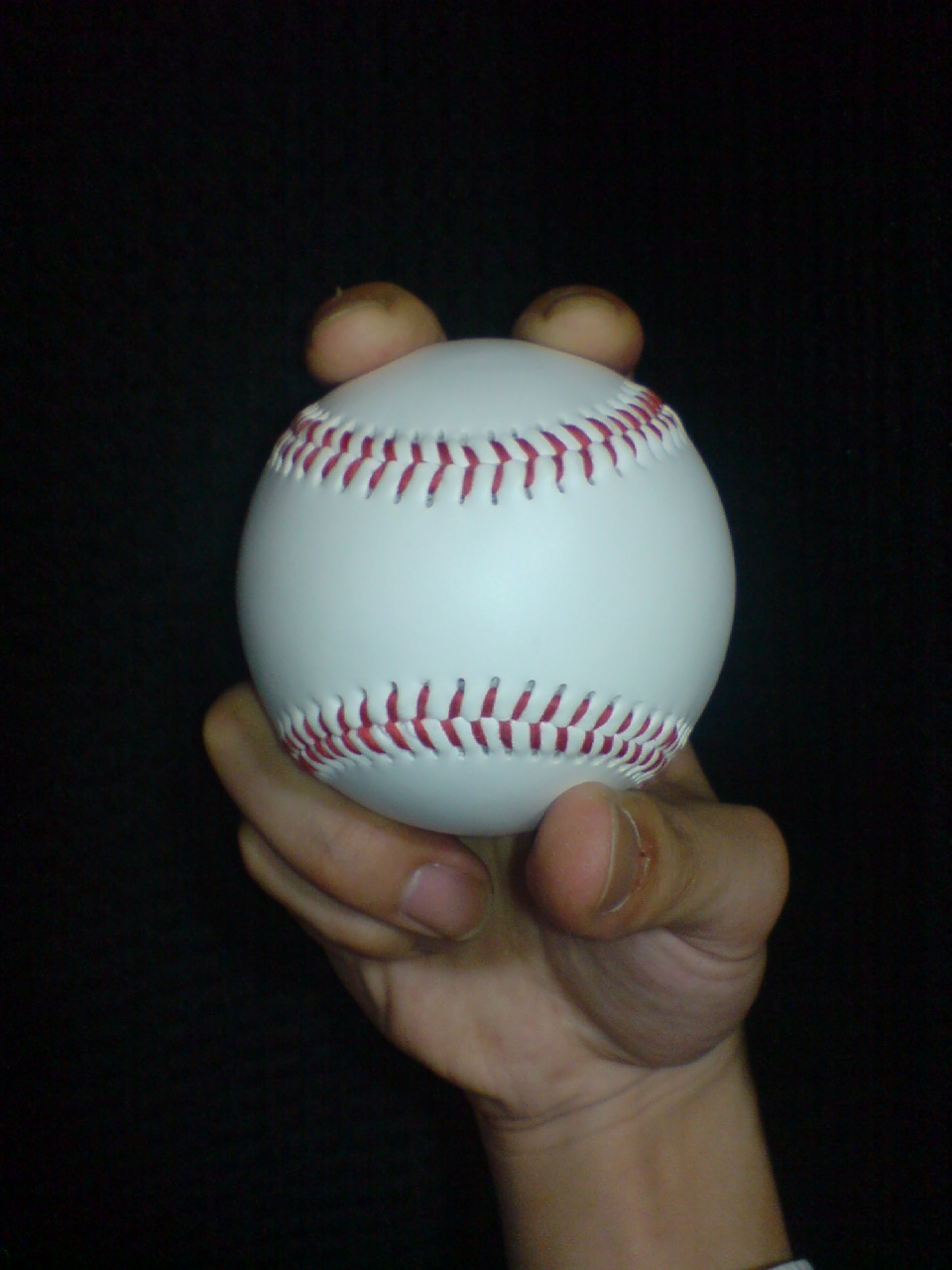
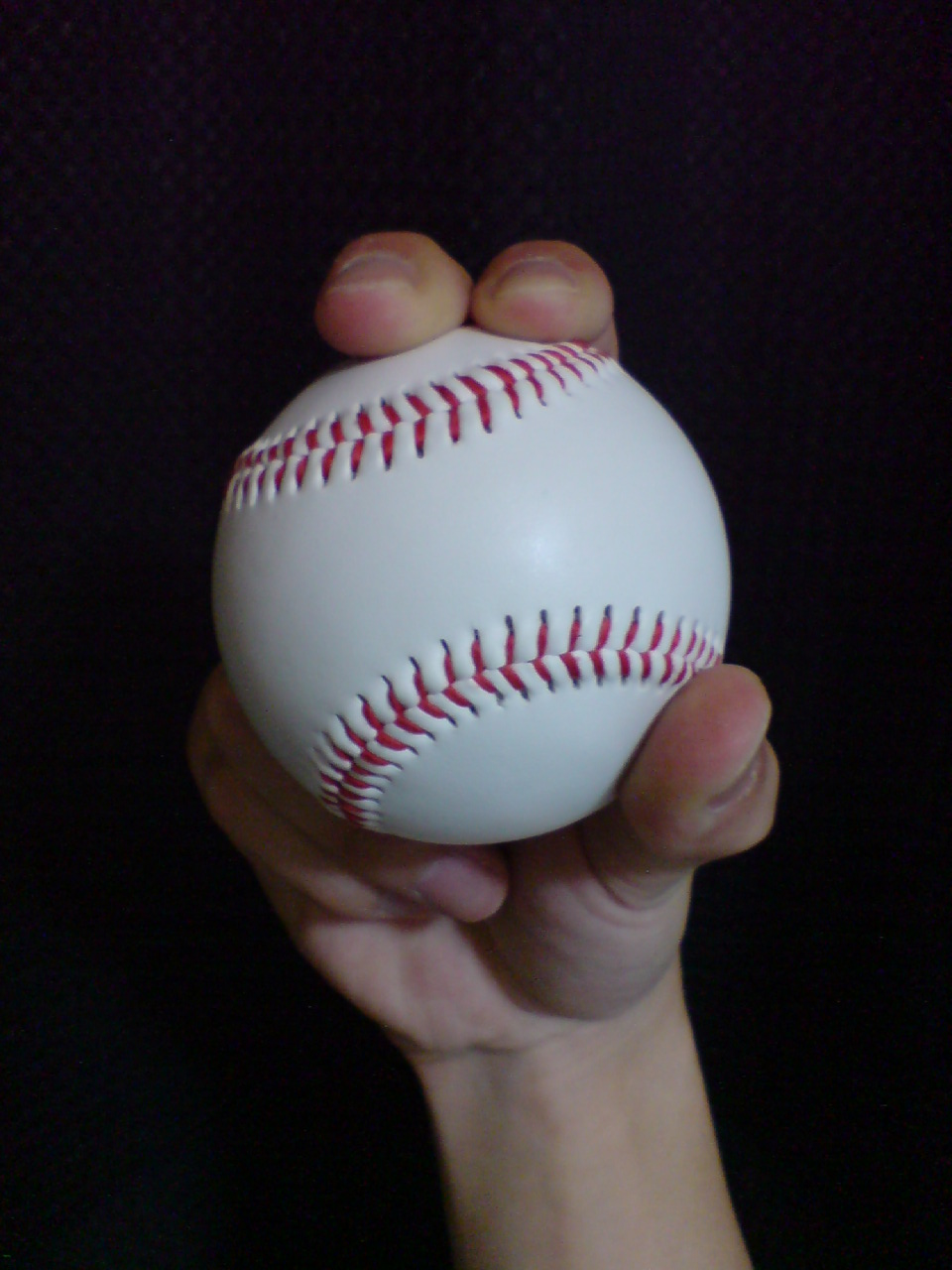
Two examples of shooting grips

The pitch can be thrown with the same grip as a two-seam fastball, or a variation thereof, depending on the pitcher.

Twisting the wrist and forearm using an inward rotation burdens the elbow and can easily lead to injury. Kudo naturally rotated inward after beginning with his forearm outwardly rotated. He released it with a push of the ball using the middle finger without straining the elbow. By contrast Hiramatsu did not put his fingers on the seams.

A baseball cliché states, "Good pitchers of the curve slider have poor shots, good pitching pitchers have poor curves". This is thought to be due to the difference in hand shape and the difference in pitching form. Aoyama Noboru stated, "In Japan's history of baseball, both curves and shoots were top notches is about Takehiko Bessho."

== Type ==
=== Razor ===
Shoots with good sharpness are called razor shoot or high speed shoot. Hisamfumi Kawamura, Ryutaro Imanishi, Akiyama Climbing, Hiramatsu's shoots are called razor shoots, Hiramatsu's shot demonstrated its power especially to the right batter. Shoots such as Morita Yukihi and Kobayashi Masahide are sometimes referred to as high-speed shoots because ball speeds exceeding 150 km/h have emerged.

=== Rotation ===
If the pitcher throws a straight ball, or if the release point shifts, the ball may have a rotation similar to the shoot, which is called shoot rotation or natural shoot. It is a mistake to throw a shot with the intention of throwing a straight ball. This requires a shift in the release point and the rotation become loose, the lateral change is also small, and the control is often lost. When a straight ball intended to be thrown aimed on a diagonal (crossfire) shoot rotates, it heads towards the center of the strike zone, so it may be easy to hit.

It is recognized that this method is not stable, but some pitchers use this as a weapon. Teruhiro Kuroki says "put power in the middle finger" against the alternative "put power in the index finger" of other pitchers when throwing the slider.
