= 2017 World Baseball Classic championship =

International baseball tournament

2017 World Baseball Classic Final
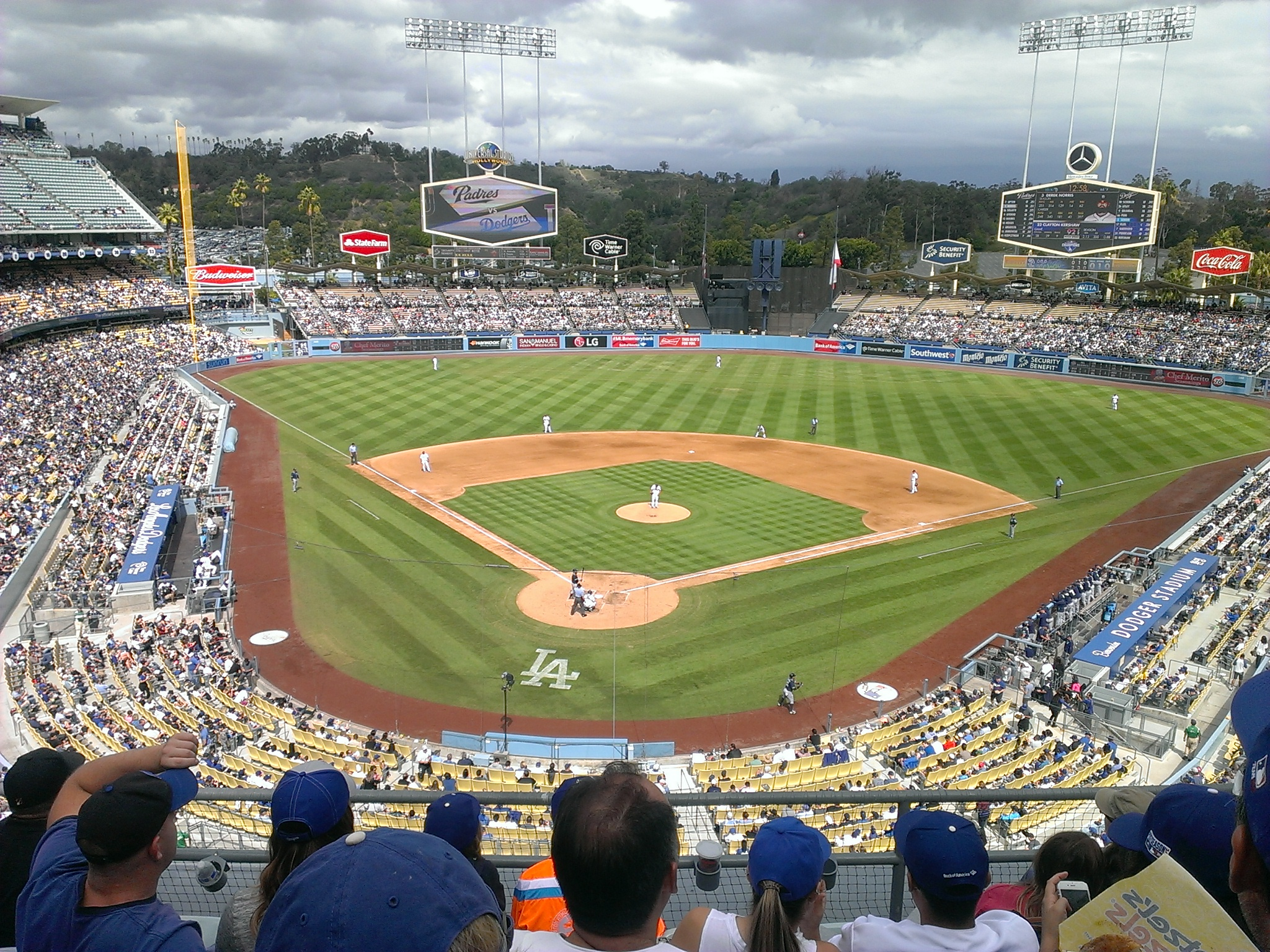
- Dodger Stadium, Los Angeles
United States	Puerto Rico
(United States)	(Puerto Rico)
8	0
	1	2	3	4	5	6	7	8	9	R	H	E
United States	0	0	2	0	2	0	3	1	0	8	13	0
Puerto Rico	0	0	0	0	0	0	0	0	0	0	3	1
- Date: March 22, 2017
- Venue: Dodger Stadium
- City: Los Angeles, California, U.S.
- Managers: Jim Leyland (United States); Edwin Rodríguez (Puerto Rico)
- Umpires: HP: (United States) Eric Cooper; 1B: (United States) Lance Barksdale; 2B: (United States) Rob Drake; 3B: (South Korea) Byung–ju Kim; LF: (Panama) Edgar Estivision; RF: (Canada) Trevor Grieve
- MVP: Marcus Stroman (United States)
- Attendance: 51,565
- Time of game: 6:21 p.m. PDT
- Television: Multiple
- Radio: Multiple

The 2017 World Baseball Classic Championship Round of the 2017 World Baseball Classic took place at Dodger Stadium in Los Angeles, California, United States, from March 20 to 22, 2017. The championship round was a single-elimination tournament with semi-finals and a Final. Japan and the Netherlands advanced to the championship round from Pool E. Puerto Rico and the United States advanced from Pool F. Defending champions Dominican Republic were eliminated in the second round.

Puerto Rico and the Netherlands played a semifinal game on March 20, while the United States and Japan played on March 21. Puerto Rico and the United States advanced to the championship game. The United States defeated Puerto Rico to win the championship. Marcus Stroman was named the tournament's Most Valuable Player.

== Bracket ==
Semifinals
ER	Netherlands	3
FW	Puerto Rico	4
FR	United States	2
EW	Japan	1

Final
SF1W	Puerto Rico	0
SF2W	United States	8

== Results ==
- All times are Pacific Daylight Time (UTC−07:00).

=== Semifinal 1 − Puerto Rico 4, Netherlands 3 ===
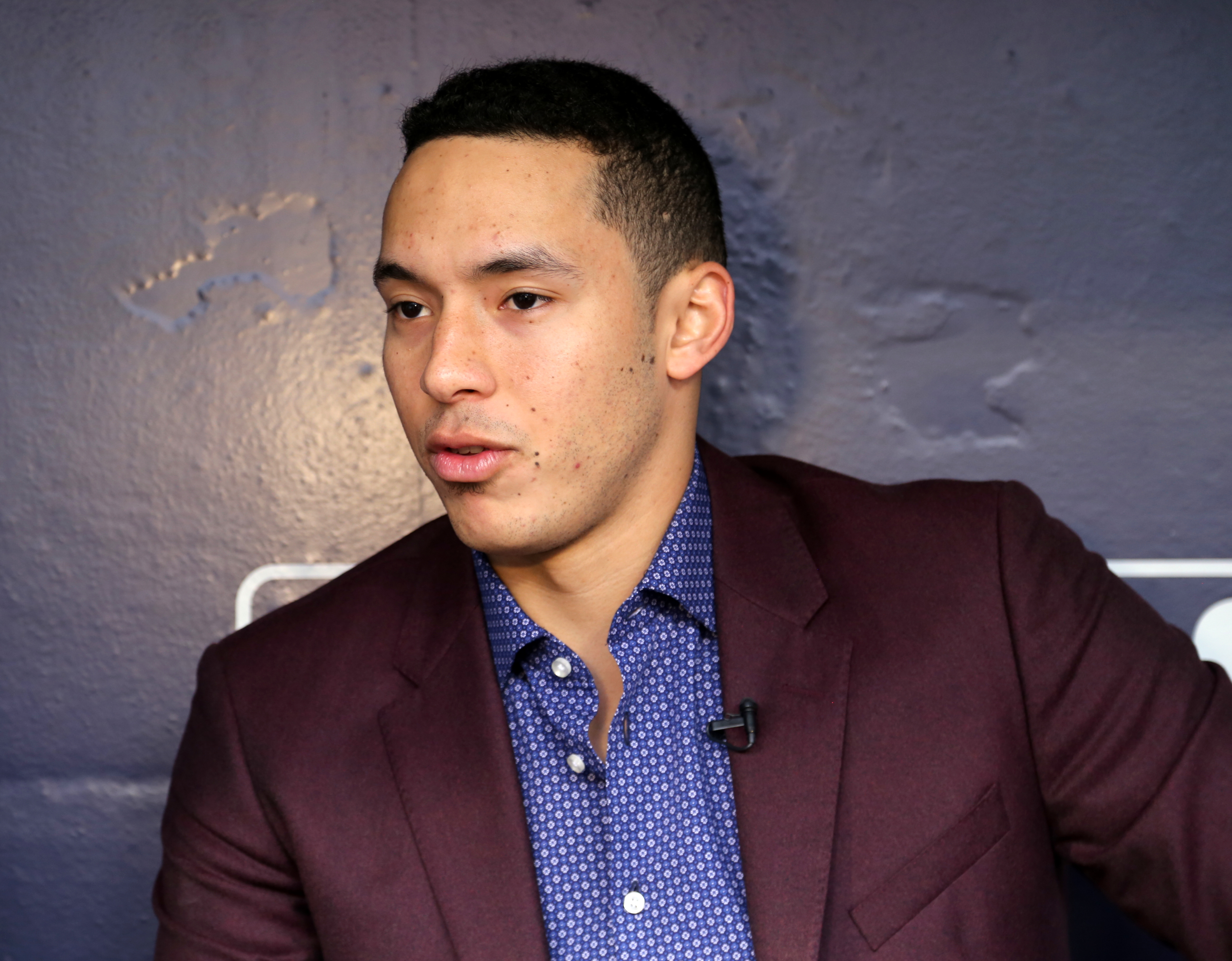
Carlos Correa hit a home run for Puerto Rico in the first inning against the Netherlands.

March 19, 18:00 at Dodger Stadium (F/11)
Team	1	2	3	4	5	6	7	8	9	10	11	R	H	E
Netherlands	2	0	0	0	1	0	0	0	0	0	0	3	11	0
Puerto Rico	2	1	0	0	0	0	0	0	0	0	1	4	12	0
WP: Edwin Díaz (1−0) LP: Loek van Mil (0−1); Home runs: NED: Wladimir Balentien (1); PUR: Carlos Correa (1), T. J. Rivera (1); Attendance: 24,865 (44.4%); Umpires: HP − Lance Barksdale, 1B − Byung-ju Kim, 2B − Rob Drake, 3B − Eric Cooper, LF − Edgar Estivision, RF − Trevor Grieve; Notes: Extra inning rule was used in 11th inning. Two outs when winning run scored. Boxscore

Prior to the game, Didi Gregorius was removed from the Netherlands roster due to a shoulder injury. The Netherlands gained Kenley Jansen, who did not pitch in the previous rounds. Rick van den Hurk started for the Netherlands and Jorge López started for Puerto Rico.

Wladimir Balentien and Carlos Correa both hit two-run home runs in the first inning. T. J. Rivera hit a home run for Puerto Rico in the second inning. The Netherlands tied the score on a run batted in (RBI) double by Shawn Zarraga in the fifth inning. From there, the game remained tied through the 10th inning.

Starting in the 11th inning, teams start each inning with runners on first and second base as a means of sudden death. The Netherlands failed to score in the top of the 11th inning, but Puerto Rico scored the game-winning run in the bottom of the inning.

=== Semifinal 2 − United States 2, Japan 1 ===
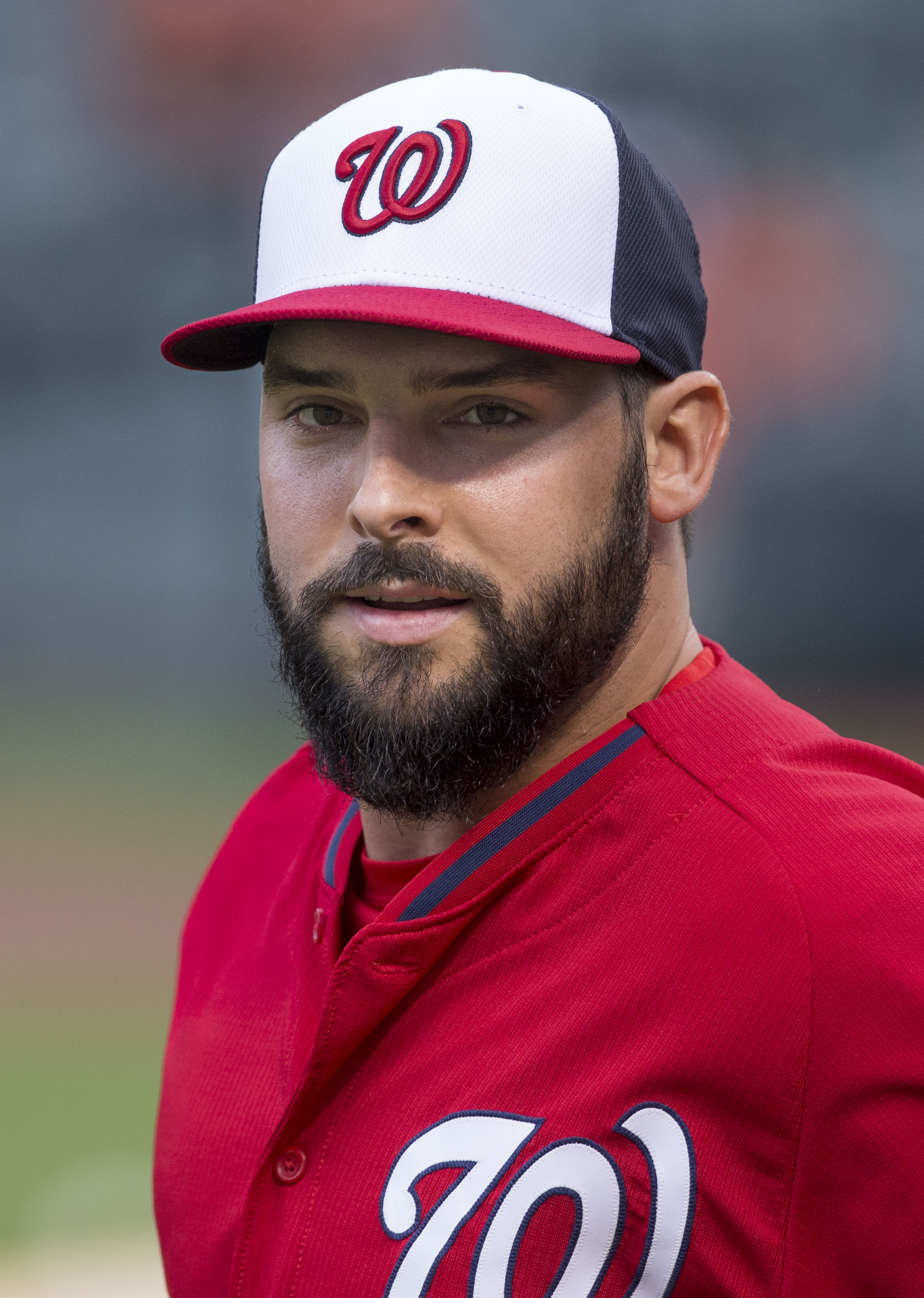
Tanner Roark pitched four scoreless innings for the United States

March 21, 18:00 at Dodger Stadium
Team	1	2	3	4	5	6	7	8	9	R	H	E
United States	0	0	0	1	0	0	0	1	0	2	6	0
Japan	0	0	0	0	0	1	0	0	0	1	4	1
WP: Sam Dyson (1−0) LP: Kodai Senga (1−1) Sv: Luke Gregerson (3); Home runs: USA: None; JPN: Ryosuke Kikuchi (1); Attendance: 33,462 (59.8%); Umpires: HP − Rob Drake, 1B − Eric Cooper, 2B − Trevor Grieve, 3B − Edgar Estivision, LF − Byung-ju Kim, RF − Lance Barksdale; Boxscore

Japan reached the semifinals with wins in all six games played in the previous rounds. Tanner Roark started for the United States in the semifinal game, while Tomoyuki Sugano started for Japan. Roark pitched four scoreless innings, while Sugano allowed one run in six innings. The United States scored a run on an RBI single by Andrew McCutchen in the fourth inning, and Ryosuke Kikuchi hit a home run for Japan in the sixth inning to tie the game. The United States scored another run in the eighth inning to take the lead, and Luke Gregerson earned the save. Though the Japanese team was considered the strongest defensive team in the WBC, misplays by Kikuchi at second base and Nobuhiro Matsuda at third base led to each of the United States's runs.

=== Final − United States 8, Puerto Rico 0 ===
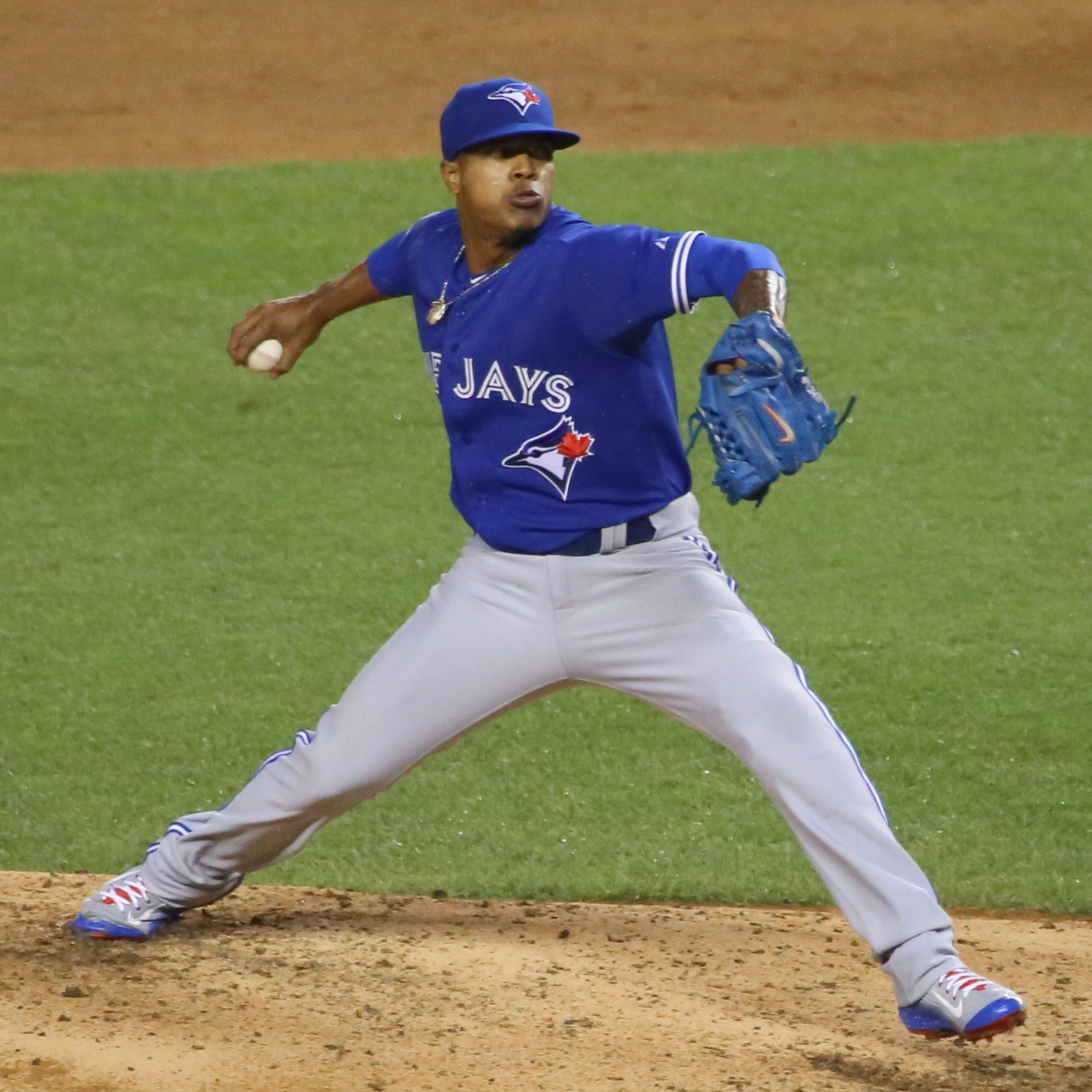
Marcus Stroman did not allow a hit in the first six innings, and was named the tournament's Most Valuable Player.

March 22, 18:00 at Dodger Stadium
Team	1	2	3	4	5	6	7	8	9	R	H	E
United States	0	0	2	0	2	0	3	1	0	8	13	0
Puerto Rico	0	0	0	0	0	0	0	0	0	0	3	1
WP: Marcus Stroman (1−1) LP: Seth Lugo (2−1); Home runs: USA: Ian Kinsler (1); PUR: None; Attendance: 51,565 (92.1%); Umpires: HP − Eric Cooper, 1B − Lance Barksdale, 2B − Rob Drake, 3B − Byung-ju Kim, LF − Edgar Estivision, RF − Trevor Grieve; Boxscore

Puerto Rico reached the championship undefeated in the tournament, winning all seven games played. Puerto Rico defeated the United States when they faced each other in Pool F. In the championship game, Seth Lugo started for Puerto Rico, and Marcus Stroman started for the United States. Ian Kinsler hit a two-run home run for the United States in the third inning, while Puerto Rico's offense faltered, failing to score a single run in the championship game. Kinsler scored again in the fifth inning on a single by Christian Yelich, and Yelich scored on an infield single by McCutchen. Two more runs scored on a bases loaded single by Brandon Crawford in the seventh inning, and Giancarlo Stanton scored the inning's third run with an RBI single. Meanwhile, Stroman did not allow a hit for the first six innings of play. The United States added another run in the eighth inning with an RBI single by McCutchen. The United States completed the shutout to win the championship. Stroman was named the tournament's Most Valuable Player.
