= 2017 World Baseball Classic Pool F =

2017 World Baseball Classic round

Pool F of the Second Round of the 2017 World Baseball Classic was held at Petco Park, San Diego, California, from March 14 to 18, between the top two teams in Pools C and D. Pool F was a round-robin tournament. Each team played the other three teams once, with the top two teams advancing to semifinals. The Dominican Republic, Puerto Rico, Venezuela, and United States advanced to Pool F.

Puerto Rico and the United States advanced to the championship round. The defending champions, the Dominican Republic, were eliminated.

== Standings ==
Pos	Team	Pld	W	L	RF	RA	RD	PCT	GB	Qualification
1	Puerto Rico	3	3	0	22	8	+14	1.000	—	Advance to championship round
2	United States (H)	3	2	1	15	11	+4	.667	1	Advance to championship round
3	Dominican Republic	3	1	2	7	9	−2	.333	2	
4	Venezuela	3	0	3	4	20	−16	.000	3	

Rules for classification: Tiebreakers
(H) Hosts

Pool F MVP: (Puerto Rico) Yadier Molina

== Results ==
- All times are Pacific Daylight Time (UTC−07:00).

=== Puerto Rico 3, Dominican Republic 1 ===
March 14, 18:00 at Petco Park
Team	1	2	3	4	5	6	7	8	9	R	H	E
Dominican Republic	0	1	0	0	0	0	0	0	0	1	6	1
Puerto Rico	1	0	0	1	0	1	0	0	X	3	6	0
WP: Hector Santiago (1−0) LP: Carlos Martínez (1−1) Sv: Edwin Díaz (1); Home runs: DOM: Nelson Cruz (1); PUR: Yadier Molina (1); Attendance: 16,637 (41.4%); Umpires: HP − Will Little, 1B − Tom Hallion, 2B − Edgar Estivision, 3B − Byung-ju Kim; Boxscore

Puerto Rico made its comeback from its three-loss streak from 2013 World Baseball Classic by giving the reigning champions Dominican Republic its first loss since the 2009 World Baseball Classic.

=== United States 4, Venezuela 2 ===
March 15, 18:00 at Petco Park
Team	1	2	3	4	5	6	7	8	9	R	H	E
Venezuela	0	0	1	0	0	0	1	0	0	2	5	2
United States	0	0	0	0	0	0	1	3	X	4	11	1
WP: Pat Neshek (1−0) LP: Héctor Rondón (0−1) Sv: Luke Gregerson (1); Home runs: VEN: Rougned Odor (1); USA: Adam Jones (1), Eric Hosmer (1); Attendance: 16,635 (41.4%); Umpires: HP − Hunter Wendelstedt, 1B − Edgar Estivision, 2B − Tom Hallion, 3B − Masanobu Sasaki; Boxscore

Drew Smyly struck out eight Venezuelan batters, while Félix Hernández did not allow a run to the United States for five innings. Adam Jones and Eric Hosmer hit home runs in the eighth inning to give the United States the lead.

=== Dominican Republic 3, Venezuela 0 ===
March 16, 19:00 at Petco Park
Team	1	2	3	4	5	6	7	8	9	R	H	E
Venezuela	0	0	0	0	0	0	0	0	0	0	8	1
Dominican Republic	0	0	0	0	1	0	1	1	X	3	8	0
WP: Fernando Abad (1−0) LP: Jhoulys Chacín (0−1) Sv: Jeurys Familia (2); Home runs: VEN: None; DOM: Gregory Polanco (1), Nelson Cruz (2); Attendance: 16,390 (40.8%); Umpires: HP − Tom Hallion, 1B − Byung-ju Kim, 2B − Hunter Wendelstedt, 3B − Masanobu Sasaki; Boxscore

=== Puerto Rico 6, United States 5 ===
March 17, 19:00 at Petco Park
Team	1	2	3	4	5	6	7	8	9	R	H	E
United States	0	1	0	0	1	1	0	0	2	5	7	2
Puerto Rico	4	0	0	0	0	2	0	0	X	6	8	0
WP: Seth Lugo (2−0) LP: Marcus Stroman (0−1) Sv: Edwin Díaz (2); Home runs: USA: Buster Posey (1), Adam Jones (2); PUR: None; Attendance: 32,463 (80.8%); Umpires: HP − Will Little, 1B − Hunter Wendelstedt, 2B − Masanobu Sasaki, 3B − Edgar Estivision; Boxscore

With their win against the United States, Venezuela was eliminated from the WBC for the second time since missing out from the first round in the 2013 World Baseball Classic.

=== Puerto Rico 13, Venezuela 2 ===
March 18, 12:30 at Petco Park
Team	1	2	3	4	5	6	7	8	9	R	H	E
Puerto Rico	1	0	1	0	1	2	5	1	2	13	17	0
Venezuela	0	0	0	0	0	2	0	0	0	2	5	2
WP: José De León (1−0) LP: Martín Pérez (0−1); Home runs: PUR: Kennys Vargas (1); VEN: Rougned Odor (2); Attendance: 20,778 (51.7%); Umpires: HP − Hunter Wendelstedt, 1B − Edgar Estivision, 2B − Byung-ju Kim, 3B − Will Little; Boxscore

=== United States 6, Dominican Republic 3 ===
March 18, 19:00 at Petco Park
Team	1	2	3	4	5	6	7	8	9	R	H	E
United States	0	0	2	2	0	0	0	2	0	6	8	1
Dominican Republic	2	0	0	0	0	0	1	0	0	3	9	0
WP: Danny Duffy (2−0) LP: Ervin Santana (0−1) Sv: Luke Gregerson (2); Home runs: USA: Giancarlo Stanton (1); DOM: Robinson Canó (1); Attendance: 43,002 (107.1%); Umpires: HP − Bill Miller, 1B − Will Little, 2B − Byung-ju Kim, 3B − Masanobu Sasaki; Boxscore

Title holders Dominican Republic suffered a shocking elimination to the United States for their final position.
