= Park effects =

In sports, park effects are the unique factors of each stadium or arena that impact a game's outcome. These effects are broken down into different components and used in advanced statistical analysis. While most sports have regulation-sized fields, some sports or leagues, such as Major League Baseball (MLB) and NCAA hockey, allow for varying field of play dimensions. The most common example of a park effect is a baseball stadium's batting park factor, but there exist other factors that impact all sports. Every stadium throughout the world has its own unique effects that impact the sports played there.

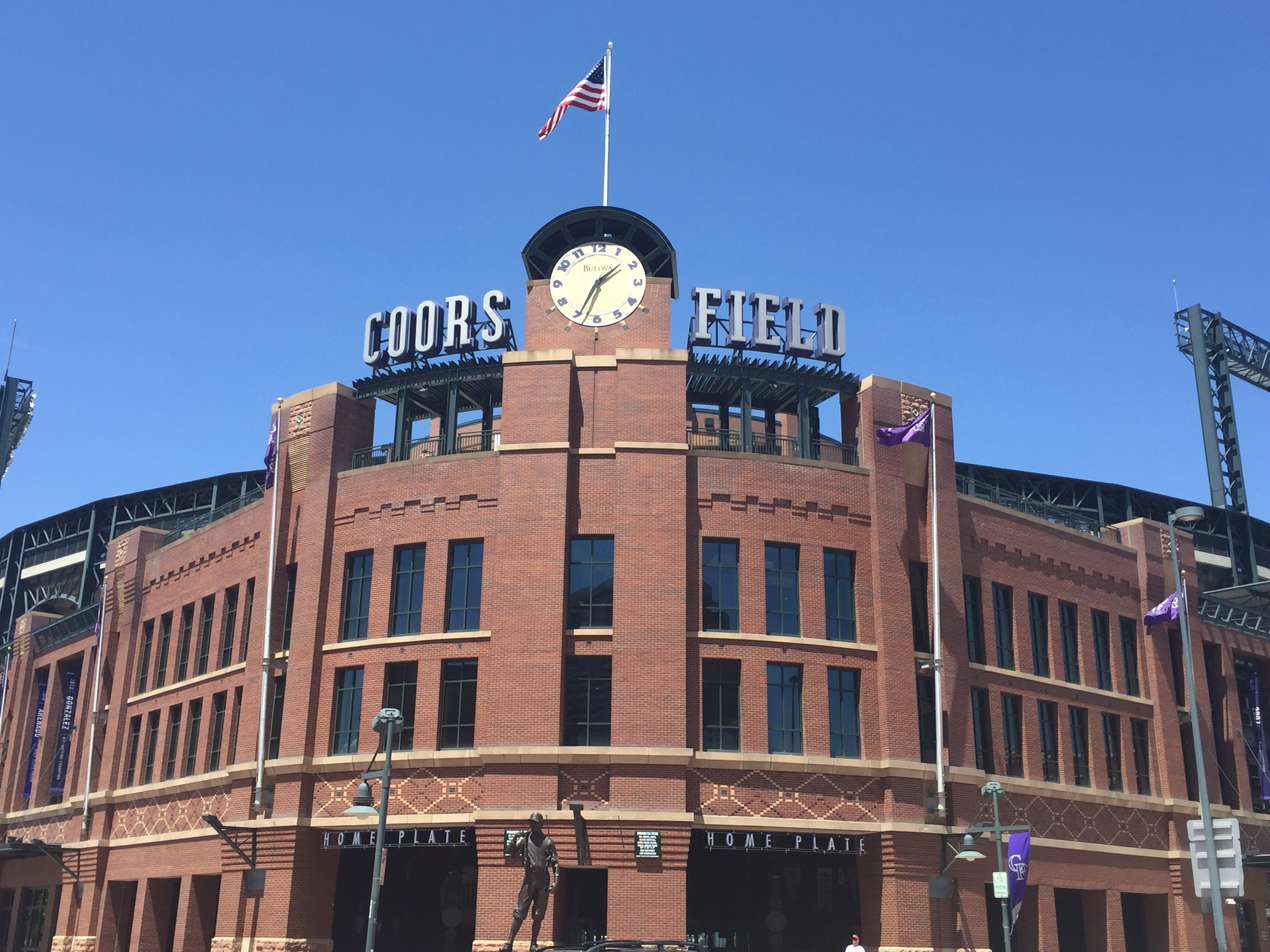
Coors Field, at 5,200 feet (1,600 m) above sea level, has the highest altitude of any MLB stadium.

== Park factors (baseball) ==
Because baseball allows for unique field dimensions, each stadium is prone to favoring certain outcomes, and thus can favor pitchers or hitters. This has become the most prominent park effect, known as park factors (PF), which indicate the difference between a team's offense and defense in home and road games. These calculations generally exclude Coors Field, due to its higher altitude, and interleague games, due to the variation of the designated hitter (DH) until the 2020 season, when the DH position was added by the National League.

Used as a part of many statistical prediction models, park factors can explain varying offensive outputs of specific players, teams and eras of baseball. These factors can be produced based on many offensive statistics, but are generally and most easily calculated based on team runs and home runs.

=== Calculations ===
A general description of park factors includes comparing the number of runs scored and allowed by each individual team at home and subsequently compared to league average. League average can be adjusted for each team to account for which stadiums each team actually played in, but statistically, the difference is marginal and is thus ignored. Runs scored are compared to games (or outs, as there are 27 outs in a game) rather than plate appearances, because the outs per game stay constant while the number of plate appearances changes. The following formulas calculate park factors:

$$\mathrm{PF} = \frac{HT}{(T-1)(R+H)}$$

where $H$ is the number of home runs per game, $R$ is the number of road runs per game, and $T$ is the number of teams in the league.

The intermediate park factor (iPF) makes PF applicable to composite stats rather than just home stats. iPF is calculated as follows:

$\mathrm{iPF} = \frac{\mathrm{PF} +1}{2}$

The final PF (fPF) uses weights to regress the data based on which year it came from. Although weights can be calculated in various ways, the general consensus is any differences are marginal. fPF is calculated as follows:

$\mathrm{fPF} = 1-(1-\mathrm{iPF})X_i$

where $X_i$ is the weight for the $i$th year.

These calculations give fPF on a scale of 1, meaning that 1 is the league average and every hundredth (0.01) above or below 1 corresponds to one percent above or below the league average. For example, an fPF of 1.20 means that offense, based on runs, is expected to be 20% increased; and, vice versa, a fPF of 0.80 means that offense is expected to be decreased by 20%.

=== Application outside Major League Baseball ===
Park factors have recently been applied to leagues outside the MLB. In Minor League Baseball, there are 160 affiliate teams above the rookie complex level, across 14 leagues, of which all have their own park factors, determined by various offensive stats, the most common being runs and home runs. Further examples include the calculation of park factors in Nippon Professional Baseball and prospective future calculations by FanGraphs in the Korea Baseball Organization. Park factors have even been calculated for non-professional leagues, such as the Cape Cod League, a top summer collegiate baseball league in the United States.

== Altitude ==
Altitude affects all sports in various ways. At higher altitudes, all physical activity becomes more difficult for many reasons, including the lower oxygen levels. But beyond the impact on the athletes, who experience physiological effects in all sports, higher altitudes also result in less air resistance on moving objects. In baseball, this lower air resistance produces more runs. While much of the research regarding the effects of altitude on the flight of baseballs is relative to more home runs, altitude has been shown to increase offense in all aspects which contact is made. The only MLB stadium of significantly high altitude is Coors Field; however, there are several other professional stadiums throughout the country also at high altitudes. MLB stadium altitudes range from the 5,211 feet (1,588 m) above sea level of Coors Field to the 20 feet (6.1 m) of Philadelphia's Citizen Bank Park. Yet, one must consider that much of the influence of altitudes is de facto calculated in a stadium's park factor as a result of total offensive output by stadium.

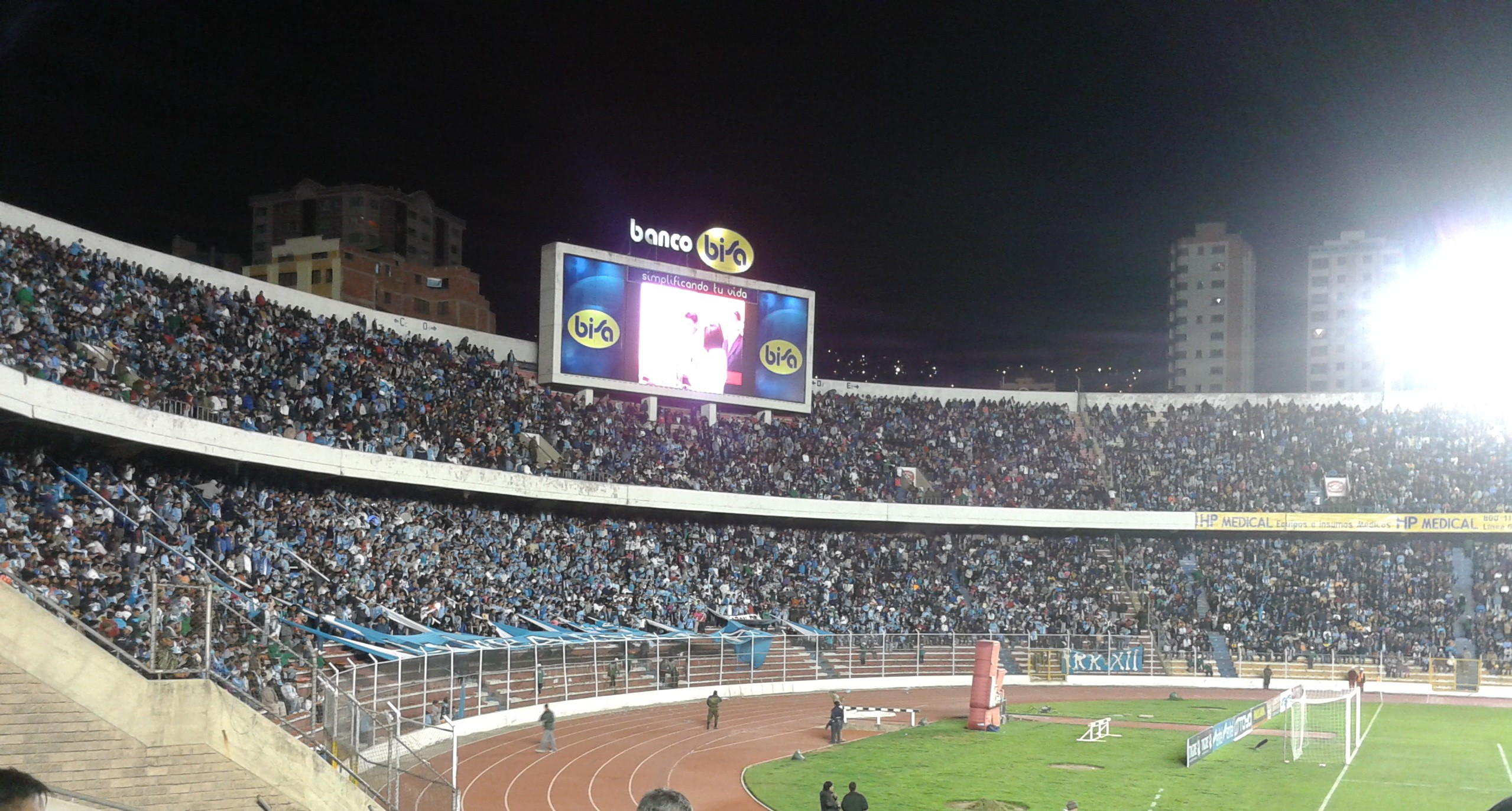
The Estadio Hernando Siles in use during a Bolivian National Team game.

In basketball, just as in baseball, altitudes impact shot basketballs. Shooters tend to expand their shooting range as the basketballs experience less air resistance when shot. This is why it is generally expected that teams who play their home games at higher altitudes have a stronger home court advantage; however, this has also been seen to produce a weaker away game production for these same high-altitude teams.

In football, these same effects on moving objects is in play, allowing the football to travel further with the same energy put into it. Thus kickers tend to kick from further distances with ease, and quarterbacks throw further with the same ease. However, players have disagreed on how strong an influence the altitude of the venue plays in the outcome of the game and performance of the players.

Soccer, being a worldwide sport, has more variance among its stadiums as well as the geography of these stadiums. This results in stadiums over double the maximum American stadium altitude, and consequently, stronger effects. This has driven much controversy over the validity of certain stadiums, such as the Estadio Hernando Siles in Bolivia, which sits close to 12,000 feet (3,700 m) above sea level. Due to the stadium's extremely high altitude, the Estadio Hernando Siles was, at one point, facing a ban by FIFA attributed to an unfair advantage, but the ban was revoked after about a year. Latin American countries and leaders argued that this was not intentional but rather a lay of the land and discriminated against many South American countries.

== Dome effects (basketball) ==
One of the more noticeable park effects in basketball occurs in NCAA basketball. There is noticeably lower shooting numbers in domed stadiums, usually football stadiums temporarily converted to a basketball arena, compared to typical basketball arenas. This has become so well accepted that even sport betting bookmakers have been known to lower point-based bets in domed stadiums. The most notable stadium which has wreaked havoc on shooting numbers is NRG Stadium, usual home of the Houston Texans, but at times the home of some college basketball games. However, there are studies which debunk this effect, labeling it as a myth. Using various measures of offense (points, free throws, multiple shooting percentages), it has been argued that domed stadiums do not average lower offensive numbers to any significance, and in some instances are better.

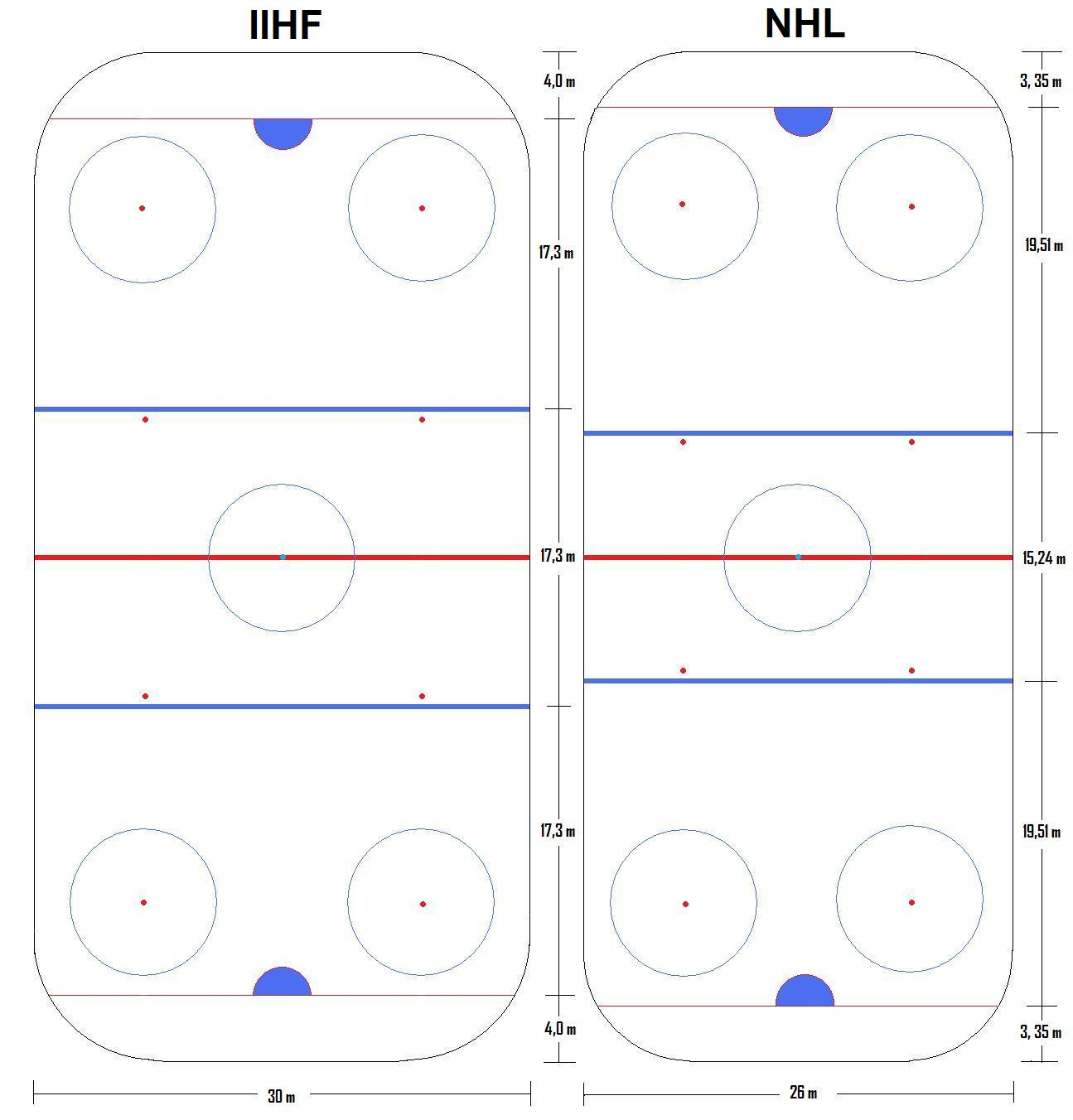
Dimensional differences between international ice hockey rinks and NHL rinks.

== Rink size (hockey) ==
While the NHL has a constant rink size throughout the league, Olympic hockey uses a larger rink, and there are various rink sizes in NCAA hockey. Although not measured quite to the extent of baseball, varying rink sizes do strongly impact the outcome of the game and how specific players perform. Those who have played on various sized rinks tend to agree that the smaller the rink, the quicker the pace of the game. Conversely, for larger rinks, in which there is more space to play, players have more time to react and skate.
