= Gyroball =

Type of baseball pitch popular among Japanese pitchers

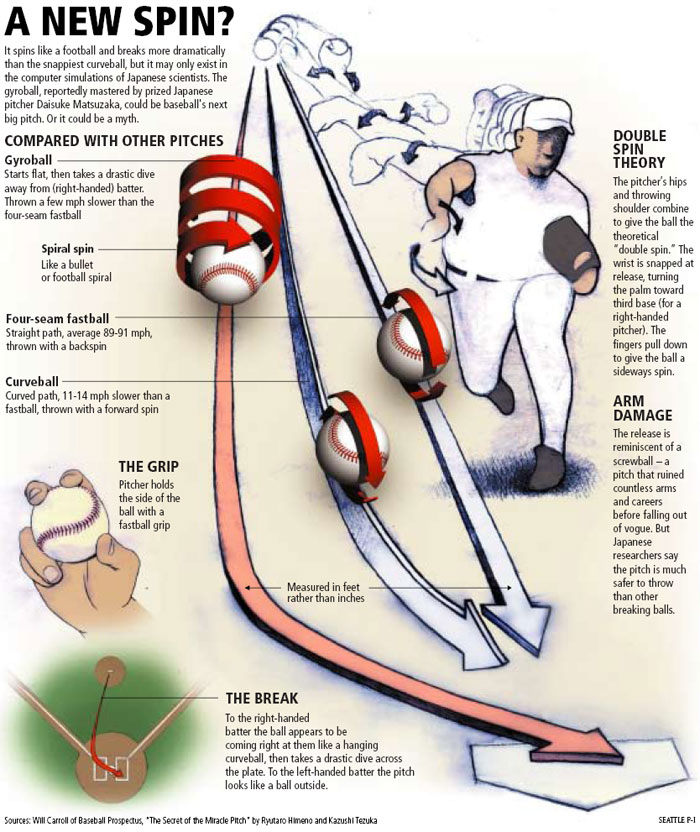

A gyroball is a rare type of baseball pitch used primarily by players in Japan. It is thrown with a spiral-like spin, similar to bullet from a rifle, or an American football pass. This spin stabilizes the ball in flight, minimizing its deviation from a straight-line path to home plate. The gyroball is sometimes confused with the shuuto, another pitch used in Japan.

== Overview ==
The gyroball pitch was first developed by Ryutaro Himeno (Note: 姫野 龍太郎), a scientist who used computer simulations to model baseball flight paths, and Kazushi Tezuka, a baseball instructor who developed a throwing technique to pitch a gyroball. The pitch is thrown with a pronated motion of the arm and from a low arm angle, which Himeno and Tezuka argue reduces arm strain.

This delivery creates a bullet-like spin on the ball, similar to the way an American football spins when thrown. The effect of this spin, which minimizes the Magnus force on the ball, is often misunderstood; a correctly-thrown gyroball will have minimal deflection from its straight path to home plate. Multiple early reports on the gyroball mistakenly claimed that the gyroball moved more than a conventional pitch, behaving like an extreme curveball or slider.

== Relationship to other pitches ==
The unconventional spin of a gyroball is similar to the primary spin axis of some knuckleball pitches, such as those thrown by R. A. Dickey. However, knuckleballs are intended to minimize the ball's spin, increasing the effects of air drag to create an erratic flight-path, unlike the stabilizing spin of a gyroball.

The gyroball is often confused with another primarily Japanese pitch, the shuuto. Some of this confusion stems from an error in an early article on the gyroball by baseball writer Will Carroll. Although Carroll later corrected himself, the confusion still persists.

The unconventional spin may also lead a batter to mistakenly identify the pitch as a high-movement slider when the ball leaves the pitcher's hand, even though the pitch will end up moving like a fastball once in flight.

== Appearance in popular culture ==
=== Video games ===
Baseball Mogul was the first game to include the gyroball, in 2005. MLB 07: The Show and The Bigs also include the pitch. Daisuke Matsuzaka is the only pitcher with a gyroball in each of these games. However, the movement of the pitch in the video game differs from the movement of the actual pitch, and Matsuzaka believes that the programmers mistook one of his other pitches for the gyroball. It is also an obtainable ability in the game MLB Power Pros.

=== Japanese animation ===
In the Japanese manga and anime baseball series Major, the protagonist, Goro, is known for his use of the gyroball pitch, which was his only pitch until he eventually adds a forkball to his repertoire.

== Pitchers who throw the gyroball ==
Confusion about the nature of the gyroball, especially outside Japan, means that the list of pitchers who are believed to throw gyroballs is variable, depending on the source. Kazushi Tezuka cited Shunsuke Watanabe, Tetsuro Kawajiri, and Tomoki Hoshino as examples of Japanese gyroball pitchers when explaining the pitch to an American audience.

Much of the discussion of the gyroball in Major League Baseball circles stemmed from Daisuke Matsuzaka, a Japanese pitcher who joined the Boston Red Sox in 2007. His slider was mislabeled as a gyroball in video analyses. Matsuzaka had said he was trying to learn to throw the gyroball, but it is unclear if he ever actually threw it.

Various other pitchers have claimed to be learning to throw gyroballs, or have been claimed by others to throw gyroballs. Tezuka claims that many children throw gyroballs unintentionally before their instructors modify their pitching form to produce more standard pitches.
