= Controversies at the 2006 World Baseball Classic =

There were a number of controversies surrounding the 2006 World Baseball Classic.

== Format ==
In the Classic, the Korean team played in and won every game they played in Pool A. They advanced to round two, again winning all three games to secure a place in the semifinals. However, in the semifinals, the Korean team lost to the Japanese team, who they had beaten twice previously.

Japan, despite winning the tournament, finished with a 5-3 (.625) overall record that was actually only tied with Cuba for the fourth best among tournament teams, ranking behind Korea (6–1, .857), the Dominican Republic (5–2, .714), and Puerto Rico (4–2, .667).

There was also no third place game. In addition, some felt the groupings were unevenly balanced.

== Bob Davidson ==
=== Sacrifice fly appeal, Japan vs. United States ===
In the top of the eighth inning of the second-round game between Japan and United States, a Japanese run was nullified when the umpiring crew ruled that Tsuyoshi Nishioka, who was on third base, left the base before USA left fielder Randy Winn caught the ball. Although the second-base umpire declared that the Japanese runner had tagged-up properly and was safe, home-plate umpire Bob Davidson met with the other umpires and ruled that the runner had left early. The third-base umpire had gone into left field to watch the catch and was not in any position to make a call.

Slow-motion video replays (which baseball umpires do not have access to) appeared to show Nishioka's foot on the bag when the catch is made, but his movement before the catch may have confused the home-plate umpire, as the runner's upper body appeared to begin moving before his foot left the bag. Baseball etiquette states that the home plate umpire should make the final call on tag-up plays. Therefore, the call stood and the U.S. ended up winning the game by one run in the bottom of the ninth inning. Japanese manager Sadaharu Oh called the ruling "a pity" and stated that he had never seen a call overturned in that manner before.

For a few moments after the call was decided, it looked as if the Japanese team might not return to the field, thus forfeit the game. Ultimately they took the field and the game resumed.

The play eventually had no effect on the final result of the tournament, as the United States were eliminated in that same round while Japan went on to win the entire tournament.

=== Home Run off foul pole, Mexico vs. United States ===
In the bottom of the third inning of the second-round game between Mexico and the United States, Mexican hitter Mario Valenzuela batted a ball into right field that bounced off the yellow foul pole (later proven by the yellow paint mark on the baseball), and back onto the field. By rule, the hit was a home run. First base umpire Bob Davidson, though, ruled that the ball remained in play and credited Valenzuela with a double, the strident protests of Mexican manager Paquin Estrada notwithstanding. Valenzuela would score later this inning on a Jorge Cantu single. Mexico went on to win the game, 2–1.

== Chinese Taipei ==
The Chinese Taipei baseball team was originally listed as "Taiwan" and bearing the flag of the Republic of China, but following pressure from the People's Republic of China, the listing was later changed to Chinese Taipei and bearing the Chinese Taipei Olympic flag.

Additionally, at the website of the WBC, the introduction of the Chinese Taipei team is a completely different article from the Chinese translation. The original article that the Chinese translation was based on was removed, and the Chinese version changed "Taiwan" to "Chinese Taipei" during the process of translation. The official TV commercial contains neither ROC flags.

However, MLB has given Chinese Taipei a sympathetic ear on occasion, such as the recap of its 12–3 win over China.

== Drug Testing ==
Myung Hwan Park, a pitcher for the Korean team, was disqualified from the WBC after testing positive for the use of an illegal substance. Venezuelan pitcher Freddy García tested positive for marijuana.

== Cuba ==
=== Player eligibility ===
The Cuban National Team announced it would not allow players who had defected to the United States to play in the major leagues to play on their team, eliminating big names such as Orlando Hernández, José Contreras, Danys Baez, and Rafael Palmeiro. One former defector, Orlando's half-brother Liván Hernández, expressed interest in pitching for Puerto Rico because he owns a house there and the rules allow players to compete for a nation based on permanent residency.

=== Conflict with the United States government ===
On December 14, it was also reported that the United States Treasury Department's Office of Foreign Assets Control denied the Cuban National Team a license to play due to the continuing U.S. embargo against Cuba, the embargo being in place to prevent Cuba from making a profit at the expense of the United States.

Afterward, Cuban President Fidel Castro announced publicly that any profit made by Cuba in the Classic would be donated to the victims of Hurricane Katrina. Major League Baseball's commissioner's office and the MLBPA both resubmitted Cuba's application soon after the announcement. However, after the tournament, the government refused to allow the donation.

In response to the possible exclusion of Cuba, the Puerto Rican Baseball Federation stated that it did not plan to hold games if Cuba was not allowed to participate. On January 6, 2006, the International Baseball Federation (IBAF), baseball's world governing body, also threatened to withdraw its sanctioning of the World Baseball Classic unless the Bush administration allowed Cuba to compete. A withdrawal would have dealt a crippling blow to the tournament, affecting many of the teams involved.

The entire issue came to resolution, however, on January 20, 2006, when the U.S. Treasury Department issued a license to Cuba. Department spokeswoman Molly Millerwise announced that by "working closely with World Baseball Inc. and the State Department, we were able to reach a licensable agreement that upholds both the legal scope and the spirit of the sanctions...This agreement ensures that no funding will make its way into the hands of the Castro regime.".

=== In-game protests ===
The Miami Herald reported that in the March 9, 2006 game between Cuba and the Netherlands, Jose Garcia Pino, a Cuban exile living in San Juan held up a sign saying, Abajo Fidel (Down with Fidel). The sign was clearly seen on the international feed which was carried in Cuba. He was confronted in the stands by four Cuban delegates. One of them, Angel Iglesias, vice-president of Cuba's National Institute of Sports, rushed to confront the man.

After this incident, the Cuban Baseball Federation made a deal with World Baseball Classic organizers to ban political signs from the stands. During the second game of Pool 2 play between Cuba and the Dominican Republic, a group of fans caused a scuffle at Hiram Bithorn Stadium, spelling "Abajo Fidel" with the letters on their shirts. The fans also had a small sign with the same message about the Cuban president, as did an airplane pulling a sign that appeared over the ballpark.

Other spectators chanted "Fuera! (Take them out!)" and security guards took the sign away and asked the fans with the anti-Castro message to change shirts or leave the ballpark. The anti-Castro fans wore two shirts to hide the letters when they entered the stadium, and they put their second shirts back on after an inning-long confrontation in the fifth.

Cuba refused to attend the post-game news conference for the second time in the tournament. Cuba also did not speak to journalists after the game between Cuba and the Netherlands.
