= Ariel Borrero =

Cuban baseball player

- First baseman
- Born: 1 January 1972 (age 54); Manacas, Santa Clara Province, Cuba
- Bats: Left Throws: Left

Teams
- Villa Clara (1995–2016)
Medals
Men's baseball
Representing Cuba
World Baseball Classic
| Silver medal – second place | 2006 San Diego | Team |
Baseball World Cup
| Silver medal – second place | 2009 Nettuno | Team |

Ariel Borrero Alfonso (born 1 January 1972) is a former first baseman for the Cuban national baseball team and for Villa Clara of the Cuban National Series.

Borrero was born on 1 January 1972 in the village of Manacas, located in the Santo Domingo municipality of the Santa Clara Province (now Villa Clara Province).

In the 2005-06 Cuban National Series, the left-handed Borrero hit .346 to lead Villa Clara. He led the league in doubles and triples in 1999-2000 and 2001, respectively.

Borrero was the starting first baseman for Cuba at the 2006 World Baseball Classic, where the team won the silver medal.
