= List of stadiums in Central America and the Caribbean =

The following table is a list of stadiums in Central America and the Caribbean with a capacity of at least 10,000. The other stadiums in North America are in the links above the list.

- List of indoor arenas in Canada
- List of stadiums in Canada
- List of stadiums in Mexico
- List of indoor arenas in Mexico
- List of indoor arenas in the United States
- List of U.S. stadiums by capacity

== Stadiums in Central America and the Caribbean ==
Rank	Stadium	Country	Capacity	Image
1	Estadio Latinoamericano	Cuba	55,000	
2	Estadio Cuscatlán	El Salvador	44,836	
3	Estadio Olímpico Metropolitano	Honduras	37,325	
4	Estadio Nacional de Costa Rica	Costa Rica	35,062	
5	Independence Park	Jamaica	35,000	
6	Estadio Panamericano	Cuba	34,000	
7	Estadio Rommel Fernández	Panama	32,000	
8	Calixto García Íñiguez Stadium	Cuba	30,000	
9	Estadio Pedro Marrero	Cuba	30,000	
10	Estadio Nacional de Panamá	Panama	27,000	
11	Estadio Olímpico Félix Sánchez	Dominican Republic	27,000	
12	Estadio Doroteo Guamuch Flores	Guatemala	26,000	
13	Estadio Guillermón Moncada	Cuba	25,000	
14	Trelawny Multi-Purpose Stadium	Jamaica	25,000	
15	Estadio Ricardo Saprissa Aymá	Costa Rica	23,112	
16	Hasely Crawford Stadium	Trinidad and Tobago	22,575	
17	Victoria de Girón Stadium	Cuba	22,000	
18	Estadio La Barranquita	Dominican Republic	20,000	
19	National Cricket Stadium	Grenada	20,000	
20	Queen's Park Oval	Trinidad and Tobago	20,000	
21	Stade Sylvio Cator	Haiti	20,000	
22	Hiram Bithorn Stadium	Puerto Rico	18,264	
23	Estadio Cibao	Dominican Republic	18,077	
24	Estadio General Francisco Morazán	Honduras	18,000	
25	Arnos Vale Stadium	St. Vincent and the Grenadines	18,000	
26	Estadio Augusto César Sandino	Cuba	18,000	
27	Estadio Alejandro Morera Soto	Costa Rica	17,895	
28	Stade Pierre-Aliker	Martinique	16,300	
29	Sabina Park	Jamaica	15,600	
30	Cinco de Septiembre Stadium	Cuba	15,600	
31	Thomas Robinson Stadium	Bahamas	15,023	
32	Daren Sammy Cricket Ground	St. Lucia	15,000	
33	Estadio Nacional Soberanía	Nicaragua	15,000	
34	Estadio Quisqueya Juan Marichal	Dominican Republic	14,469	
35	Estadio Cementos Progreso	Guatemala	14,022	
36	Estadio Cándido González	Cuba	14,000	
37	Nguyen Van Troi Stadium	Cuba	14,000	
38	José Antonio Huelga Stadium	Cuba	13,000	
39	Juan Ramón Loubriel Stadium	Puerto Rico	12,500	
40	Mayagüez Athletics Stadium	Puerto Rico	12,175	
41	Windsor Park	Dominica	12,000	
42	Estadio Mario Camposeco	Guatemala	11,220	
43	Kensington Oval	Barbados	11,000	
44	Sir Vivian Richards Stadium	Antigua and Barbuda	10,000	
45	Estadio Universitario Juan Abrantes	Cuba	10,000	
46	Mártires de Barbados Stadium	Cuba	10,000	
47	Ergilio Hato Stadium	Curaçao	10,000	
48	Estadio Carlos Salazar Hijo	Guatemala	10,000	
49	Ato Boldon Stadium	Trinidad and Tobago	10,000	
50	Larry Gomes Stadium	Trinidad and Tobago	10,000	
51	Manny Ramjohn Stadium	Trinidad and Tobago	10,000	
52	Estadio Carlos Miranda	Honduras	10,000	

== Indoor stadiums in Central America and the Caribbean ==
Arena	Country	Capacity	Image
José Miguel Agrelot Coliseum	Puerto Rico	18,500	
Gimnasio Nacional José Adolfo Pineda	El Salvador	12,500	
Coliseo Manuel Iguina	Puerto Rico	12,000	
Coliseo Rubén Rodríguez	Puerto Rico	12,000	
Domo Polideportivo de la CDAG	Guatemala	7,500	

The following is a list of stadiums in Central America and the Caribbean.

== List ==
=== Anguilla ===
- Webster Park, The Valley

=== Antigua and Barbuda ===
- Antigua Recreation Ground – Saint John's
- Police Ground – Saint George
- Sir Vivian Richards Stadium – Cricket Stadium
- Stanford Cricket Ground – Cricket Stadium

=== Aruba ===
soccer:

- Guillermo Prospero Trinidad Stadion – Oranjestad
- Compleho Deportivo Frans Figaroa – Noord

baseball:

- Don Elias Mansur Ballpark – Oranjestad
- Joe Laveist Sport Park – Sint Nicolaas

=== Bahamas ===
- Thomas Robinson Stadium – Nassau

=== Barbados ===
- Barbados National Stadium (outdoor running track) – Waterford, Saint Michael (Bridgetown)
- Garrison Savannah (horse racing) – Garrison Historic Area, Saint Michael (Bridgetown)
- Kensington Oval (cricket) – Fontabelle, Saint Michael (Bridgetown)
- Wildey Gymnasium (indoor facility) – Wildey, Saint Michael
- 3Ws Oval- Cricket

=== Belize ===
- Estadio Carl Ramos – Dangriga
- Marion Jones Sports Complex – Belize City
- Norman Broaster Stadium – San Ignacio
- Orange Walk People's Stadium – Orange Walk
- FFB Field – Belmopan

=== British Virgin Islands ===
- Sherly Ground – Road Town

=== Cayman Islands ===
- Truman Boden Stadium – George Town

=== Costa Rica ===
- Estadio Alejandro Morera Soto – Alajuela
- Estadio Carlos Alvarado – Santa Bárbara (canton), Heredia Province
- Estadio Carlos Ugalde Álvarez – San Carlos (canton)
- Estadio Ebal Rodríguez – Guápiles, Limón
- Estadio Edgardo Baltodano Briceño – Liberia, Guanacaste
- Estadio Eladio Rosabal Cordero – Heredia
- Estadio Guillermo Vargas Roldán – Alajuela
- Estadio Municipal Miguel "Lito" Pérez – Puntarenas
- Estadio Nacional – La Sabana, San José
- Estadio Ricardo Saprissa Aymá – Tibás
- Estadio Juan Gobán – Puerto Limón, Limón
- Estadio José Rafael Fello Meza Ivankovich – Cartago
- Jorge Hernán "Cuty" Monge Stadium – Desamparados
- Estadio Municipal Pérez Zeledón – San Isidro de El General

=== Cuba ===
- Calixto García Íñiguez Stadium – Holguín
- Cinco de Septiembre Stadium – Cienfuegos
- Estadio Augusto César Sandino – Santa Clara
- Estadio Cándido González – Camagüey
- Estadio Capitán San Luis – Pinar del Río
- Estadio Guillermón Moncada – Santiago de Cuba
- Estadio Latinoamericano – Havana
- Estadio Panamericano – Havana
- Estadio Pedro Marrero – Havana
- Estadio Universitario Juan Abrantes – Havana
- José Antonio Huelga Stadium – Sancti Spíritus
- José Ramón Cepero Stadium – Ciego de Ávila
- Mártires de Barbados Stadium – Bayamo
- Nguyen Van Troi Stadium – Guantánamo
- Victoria de Girón Stadium – Matanzas

=== Dominica ===
- Windsor Park – Roseau

=== Dominican Republic ===
- Estadio Cibao – Santiago
- Estadio Francisco Micheli – La Romana
- Estadio Julian Javier – San Francisco de Macorís
- Estadio La Barranquita – Santiago
- Estadio Olímpico – La Vega
- Estadio Olímpico Félix Sánchez – Santo Domingo
- Estadio Quisqueya – Santo Domingo
- Estadio Tetelo Vargas – San Pedro de Macorís
- Palacio de los Deportes Virgilio Travieso Soto – Santo Domingo
- Puerto Bani Stadium – Puerto Bani

=== El Salvador ===
- Estadio Anna Mercedes Campos – Sonsonate
- Estadio Correcaminos – San Francisco Gotera
- Estadio Cuscatlán – San Salvador
- Estadio España – Soyapango, San Salvador
- Estadio Hanz Usko – La Libertad
- Estadio Jorge Calero Suárez – Metapán
- Estadio Jorge "Mágico" González – San Salvador
- Estadio José Gregorio Martínez – Chalatenango
- Estadio Juan Francisco Barraza – San Miguel
- Estadio Las Delicias – Santa Tecla
- Estadio Mauricio Vides – Ilobasco
- Estadio Oscar Quiteño – Santa Ana
- Estadio Sergio Torres
- Estadio Universitario UES – UES-San Salvador
- Estadio Victoria Gasteiz – Nejapa, San Salvador

=== Grenada ===
- Cricket National Stadium – Saint George's
- Grenada National Stadium – Saint George's
- Queen's Park – Saint George's

=== Guadeloupe ===
- Stade René Serge Nabajoth – Les Abymes
- Stade St. Claude – Basse-Terre
- Stade de Riviere des Pères
- Vélodrome Amédée Detreaux
- Stade Municipal de Vieux-Habitants

=== Guatemala ===
- Estadio Armando Barillas – Escuintla
- Estadio Carlos Salazar Hijo – Mazatenango
- Estadio David Ordoñez Bardales – Zacapa
- Estadio del Ejército – Guatemala City
- Estadio Del Monte – Bananera
- Estadio El Trébol – Guatemala City
- Estadio Kaibil Balam – Huehuetenango
- Estadio La Asunción – Asunción Mita
- Estadio La Pedrera – Guatemala City
- Estadio Las Flores – Jalapa
- Estadio Las Victorias – Chiquimula
- Estadio Mariano Galvez – Santa Lucía Cotzumalguapa
- Estadio Mario Camposeco – Quetzaltenango
- Estadio Marquesa de la Ensenada – San Marcos
- Estadio Mateo Flores – Guatemala City
- Estadio Municipal Amatitlán – Amatitlán
- Estadio Pensativo – Antigua Guatemala
- Estadio Roy Fearon – Puerto Barrios
- Estadio Verapaz – Coban
- Estadio Winston Pineda (El Cóndor) – Escuintla

=== Haiti ===
- Stade Sylvio Cator – Port-au-Prince
- Parc Bayas – Mirebalais
- Parc Levelt – Saint-Marc
- Parc Saint-Victor – Cap-Haïtien

=== Honduras ===
- Estadio Argelio Sabillon – Santa Bárbara
- Estadio Carlos Miranda – Comayagua
- Estadio Excelsior – Puerto Cortés
- Estadio Fausto Flores Lagos – Choluteca
- Estadio Francisco Morazán – San Pedro Sula
- Estadio Humberto Micheletti – El Progreso
- Estadio León Gómez – Tela Timsa
- Estadio Marcelo Tinoco – Danlí, El Paraíso
- Estadio Miraflores – Santa Rosa de Copán
- Estadio Nilmo Edwards – La Ceiba
- Estadio Olímpico Metropolitano – San Pedro Sula
- Estadio Roberto Martínez Ávila – Siguatepeque
- Estadio Roberto Suazo Cordoba – La Paz
- Estadio Rubén Guifarro – Catacamas
- Estadio San Jorge – Olanchito
- Estadio Tiburcio Carías Andino – Tegucigalpa
- Estadio Yankel Rosenthal – San Pedro Sula

=== Jamaica ===
- Elleston Wakeland Stadium – Falmouth
- Emmett Park – Kingston
- Ferdi Neita Sports Complex – Portmore
- Frome Sports Club – Savanna-la-Mar
- Greenfield Stadium – Trelawny
- Harbour View Stadium – Kingston
- Independence Park – Kingston
- Prison Oval – Spanish Town
- Railway Oval – Kingston
- Sabina Park – Kingston

=== Martinique ===
- Stade d'Honneur – Fort-de-France
- Stade Louis Achille – Fort-de-France
- Stade Omnisports (Lamentin) – Lamentin

=== Montserrat ===
- Blakes Estate Stadium – Plymouth

=== Curaçao ===
==== Bonaire ====
- Kralendijk Municipal Stadion – Kralendijk
- Stadion Antonio Trenidat – Rincon

==== Curaçao ====
- Stadion Antoin Maduro – Willemstad
- Stadion Ergilio Hato – Willemstad

=== Nicaragua ===
- Estadio Cacique Diriangén – Diriamba
- Estadio Glorias Costeñas – Bluefields
- Estadio Independencia – Estelí
- Estadio Nacional Dennis Martínez – Managua
- Estadio Olímpico de San Marcos – San Marcos

=== Panama ===
- Estadio Agustín Sánchez – La Chorrera
- Estadio Armando Dely Valdés – Colón
- Estadio Javier Cruz 'Artes y Oficios' – Panama City
- Estadio Kenny Sarracín – David
- Estadio Nacional de Panamá – Panama City
- Estadio Rommel Fernández – Panama City
- Toco Castillo – Santiago de Veraguas
- Estadio Virgilio Tejeira – Penonomé, Coclé
- Estadio Bernardo Gil – San Miguelito, Panamá
- Estadio Camping Resort – Chilibre
- Estadio Municipal de Balboa – Balboa
- Estadio San Cristóbal – David

=== Puerto Rico ===
- Mayagüez Athletics Stadium – Mayaguez
- Coliseo Manuel Iguina – Arecibo
- Coliseo Rubén Rodríguez – Bayamón
- El Nuevo Comandante – Canóvanas
- Estadio Hiram Bithorn – San Juan
- Estadio Sixto Escobar – San Juan
- José Miguel Agrelot Coliseum – San Juan
- Juan Pachín Vicéns Auditorium – Ponce
- Juan Ramón Loubriel Stadium – Bayamón
- Parque Yldefonso Solá Morales – Caguas

=== St. Kitts and Nevis ===
- Elquemedo Willett Park – Charlestown, Nevis
- Warner Park Sporting Complex – Basseterre, Saint Kitts

=== St. Lucia ===
- Daren Sammy Cricket Ground – Gros Islet
- Bones Park – Castries
- Mindoo Philip Park – Castries
- Vieux Fort National Stadium – Vieux Fort Quarter

=== Saint Martin ===
- Stade Alberic Richards – Saint Martin

=== Saint Vincent and the Grenadines ===
- Arnos Vale Sports Complex, Arnos Vale
- Victoria Park, Kingstown

=== Trinidad and Tobago ===
- Ato Boldon Stadium – Couva
- Dwight Yorke Stadium – Bacolet (Tobago)
- Hasely Crawford Stadium – Port of Spain
- Larry Gomes Stadium – Malabar
- Manny Ramjohn Stadium – Marabella (San Fernando)
- Marvin Lee Stadium – Macoya
- Queen's Park Oval – Port-of-Spain
- Brian Lara Stadium – Tarouba
- Sir Frank Worrell Memorial Ground – Saint Augustine
- Sangre Grande Regional Complex – Sangre Grande
- Palo Seco Velodrome – Palo Seco
- Guaracara Park – Pointe-à-Pierre

=== Turks & Caicos ===
- TCIFA National Academy – Providenciales

=== United States Virgin Islands ===
- Lionel Roberts Park – St. Thomas

== Gallery ==
North American stadiums

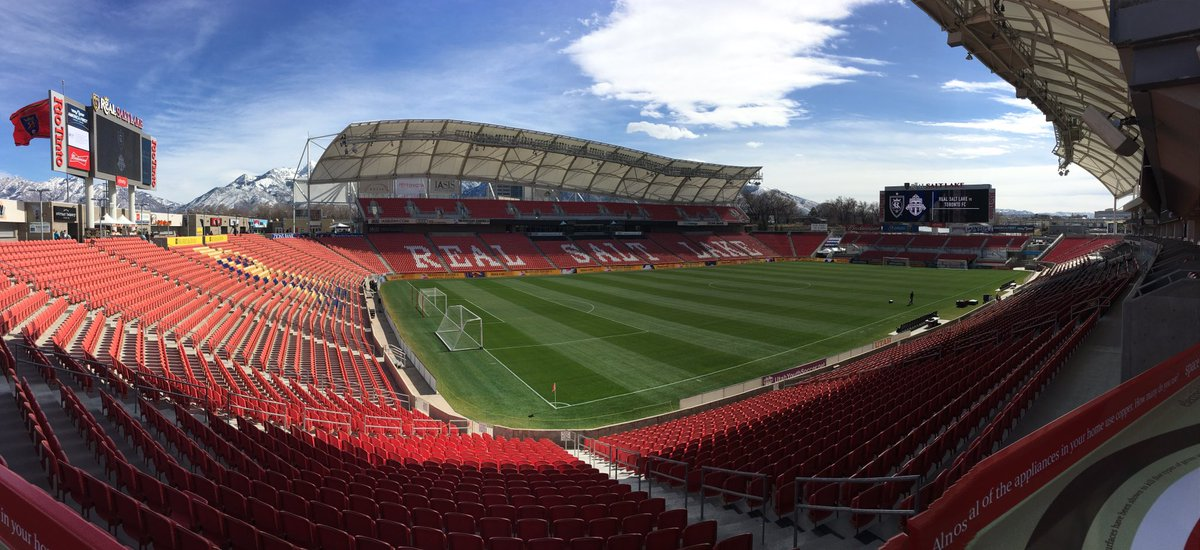
America First Field

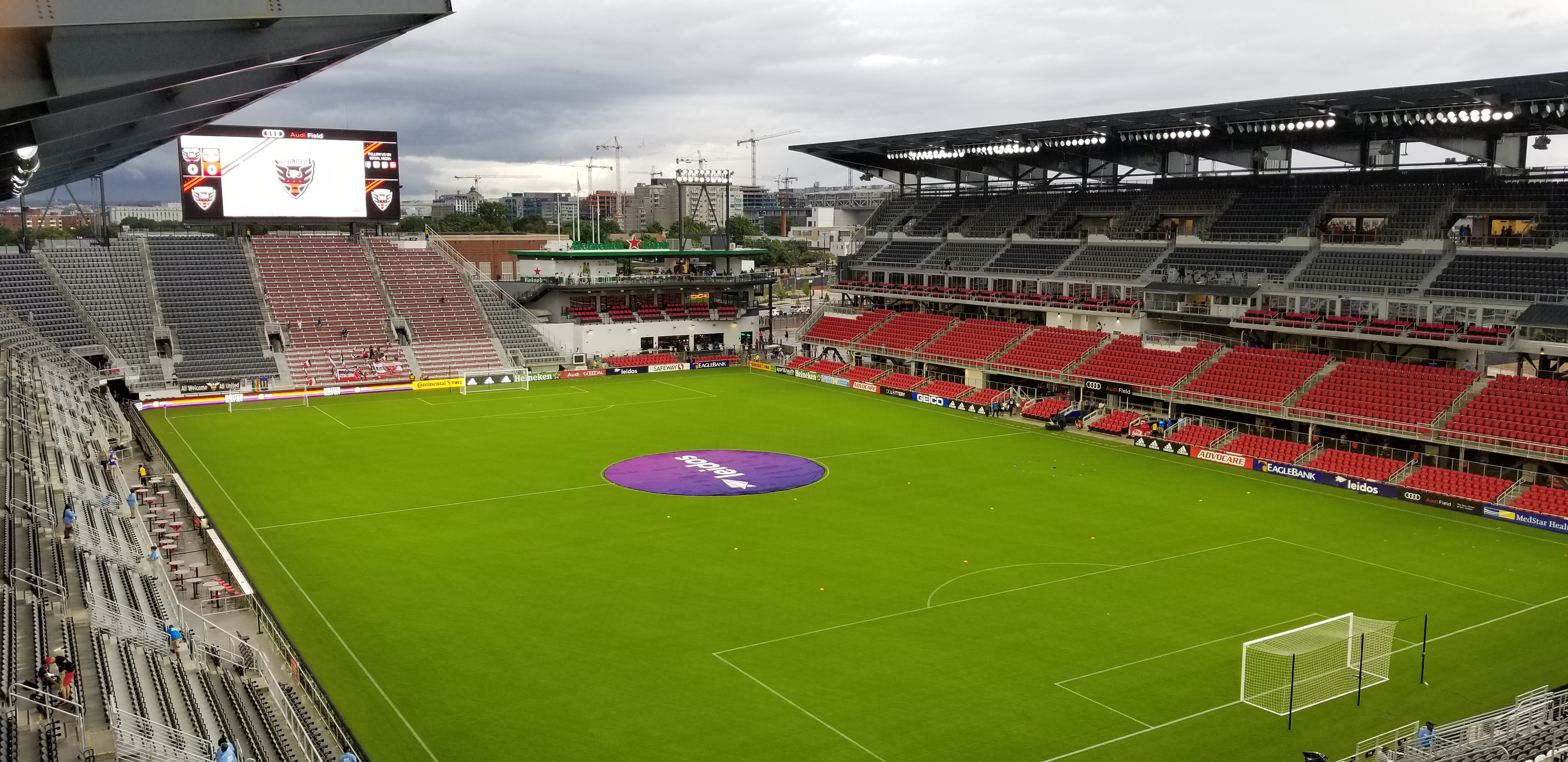
Audi Field

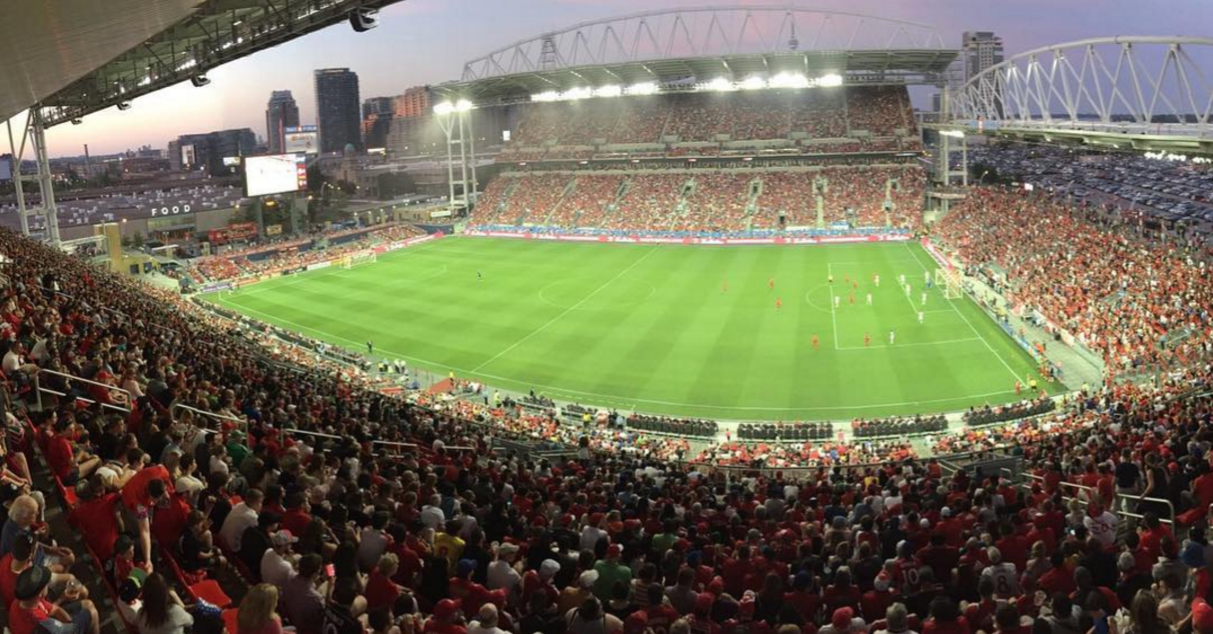
BMO Field

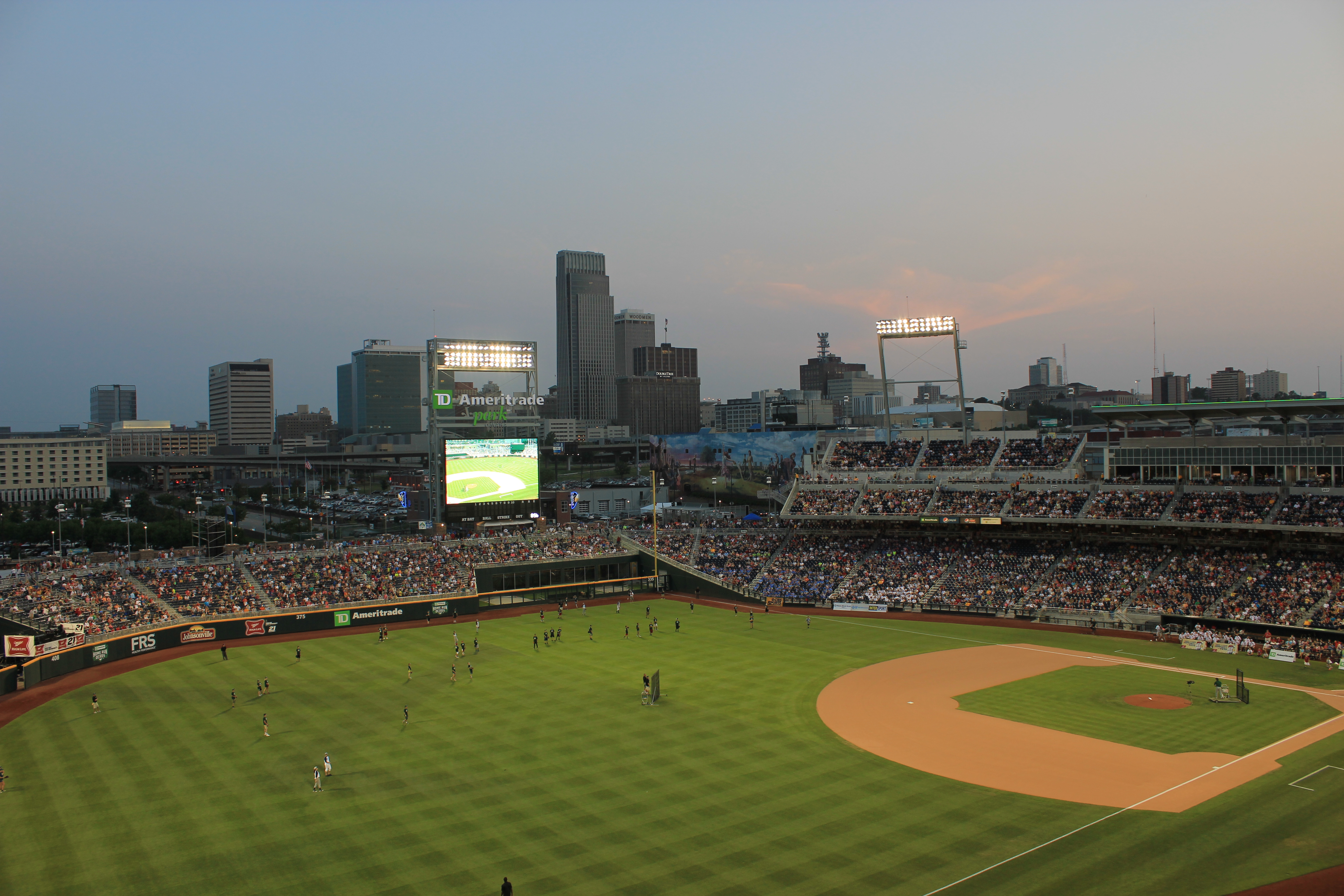
Charles Schwab Field Omaha

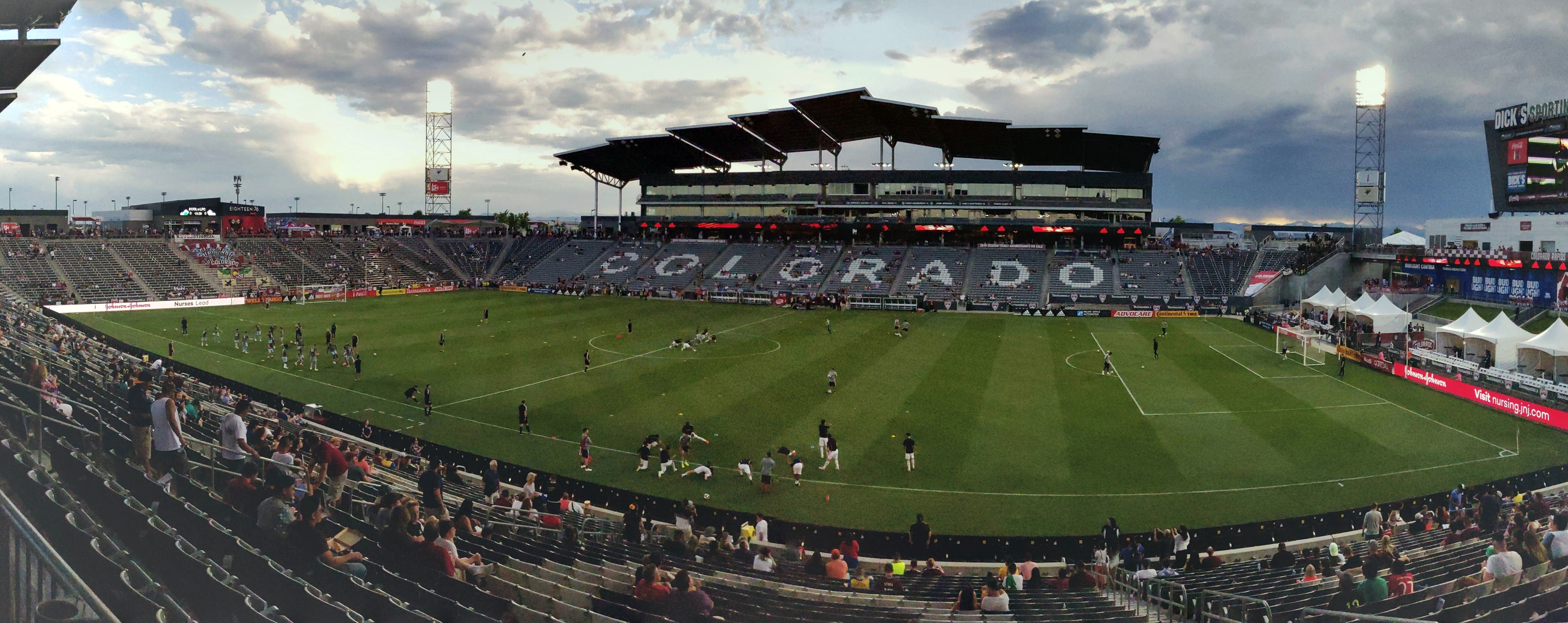
Dick's Sporting Goods Park

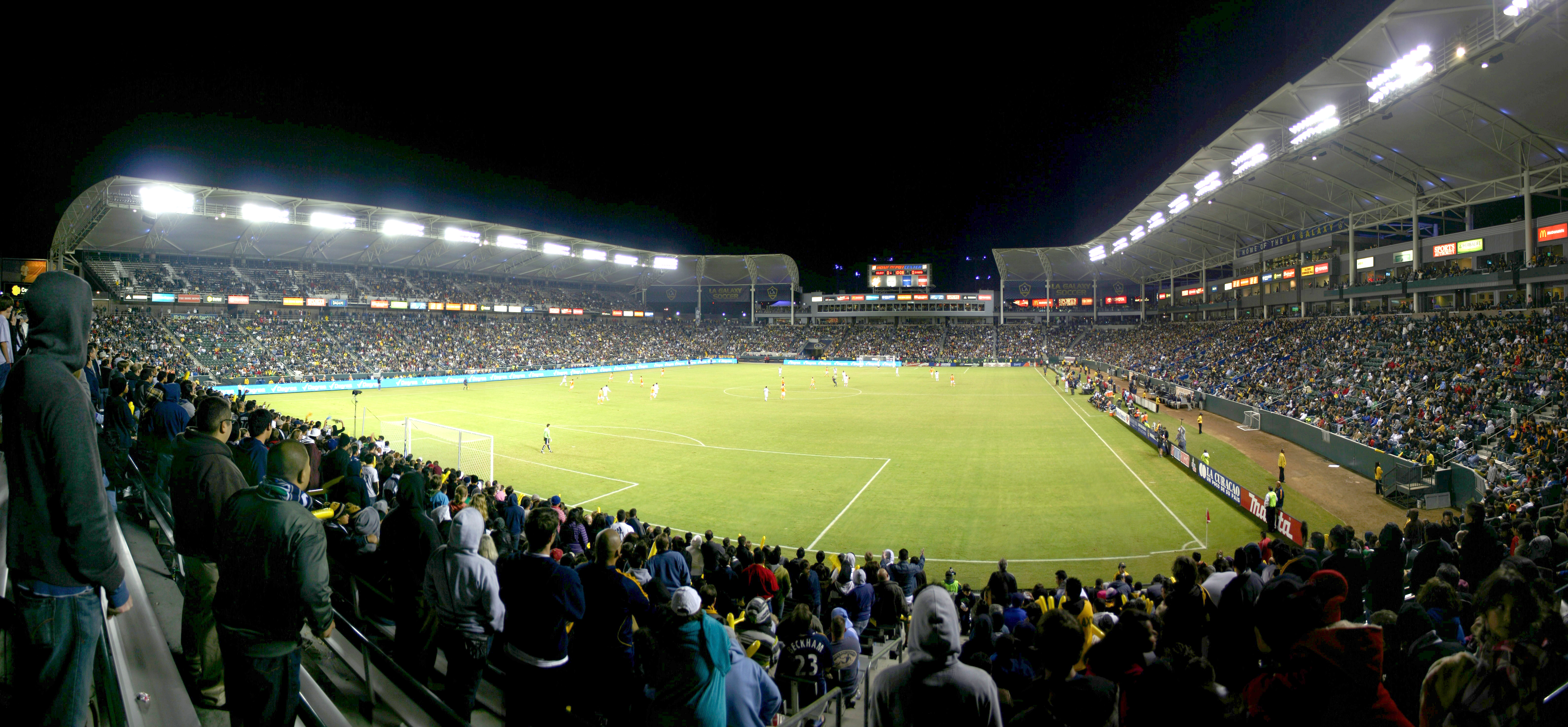
Dignity Health Sports Park Soccer Stadium

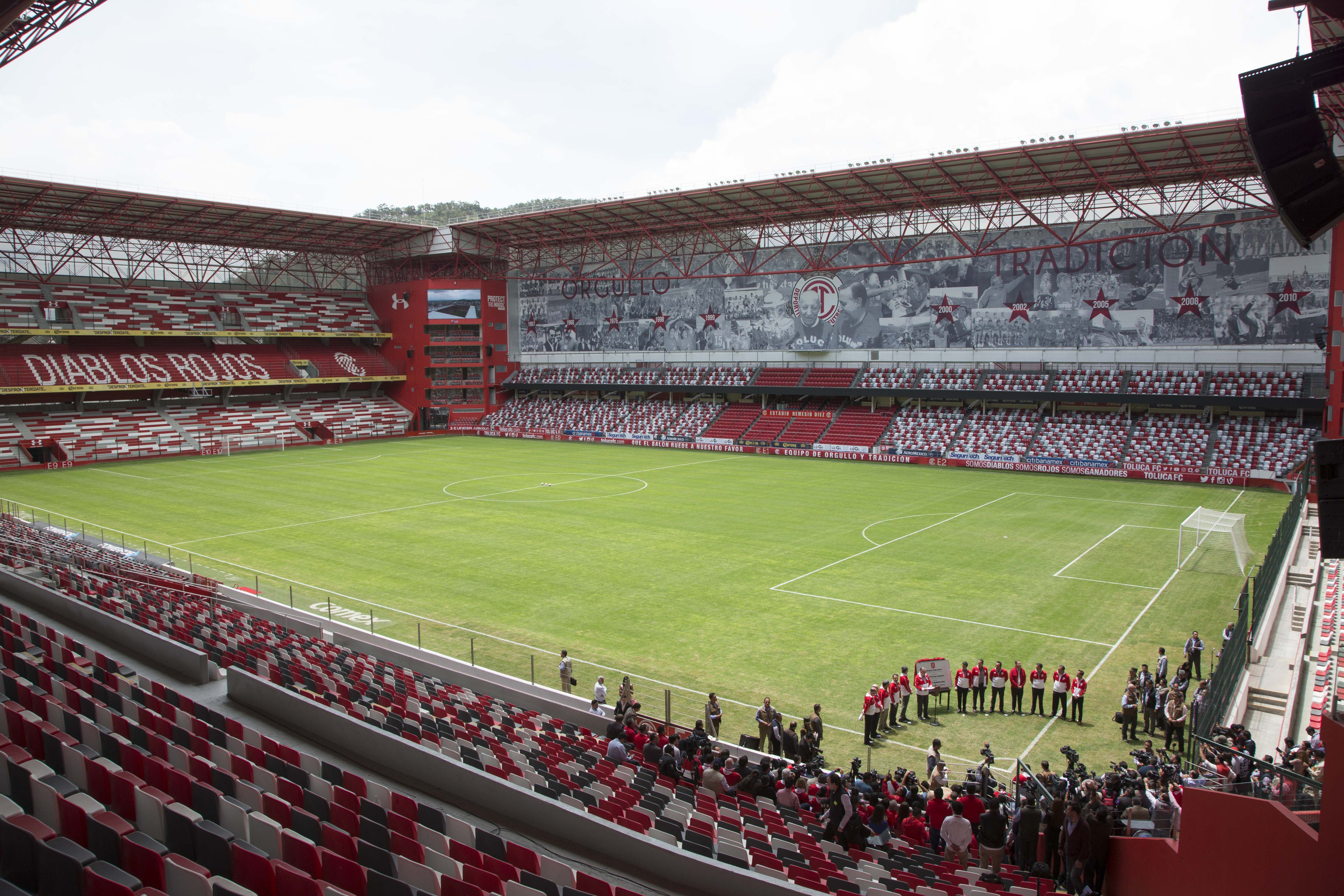
Estadio Nemesio Díez

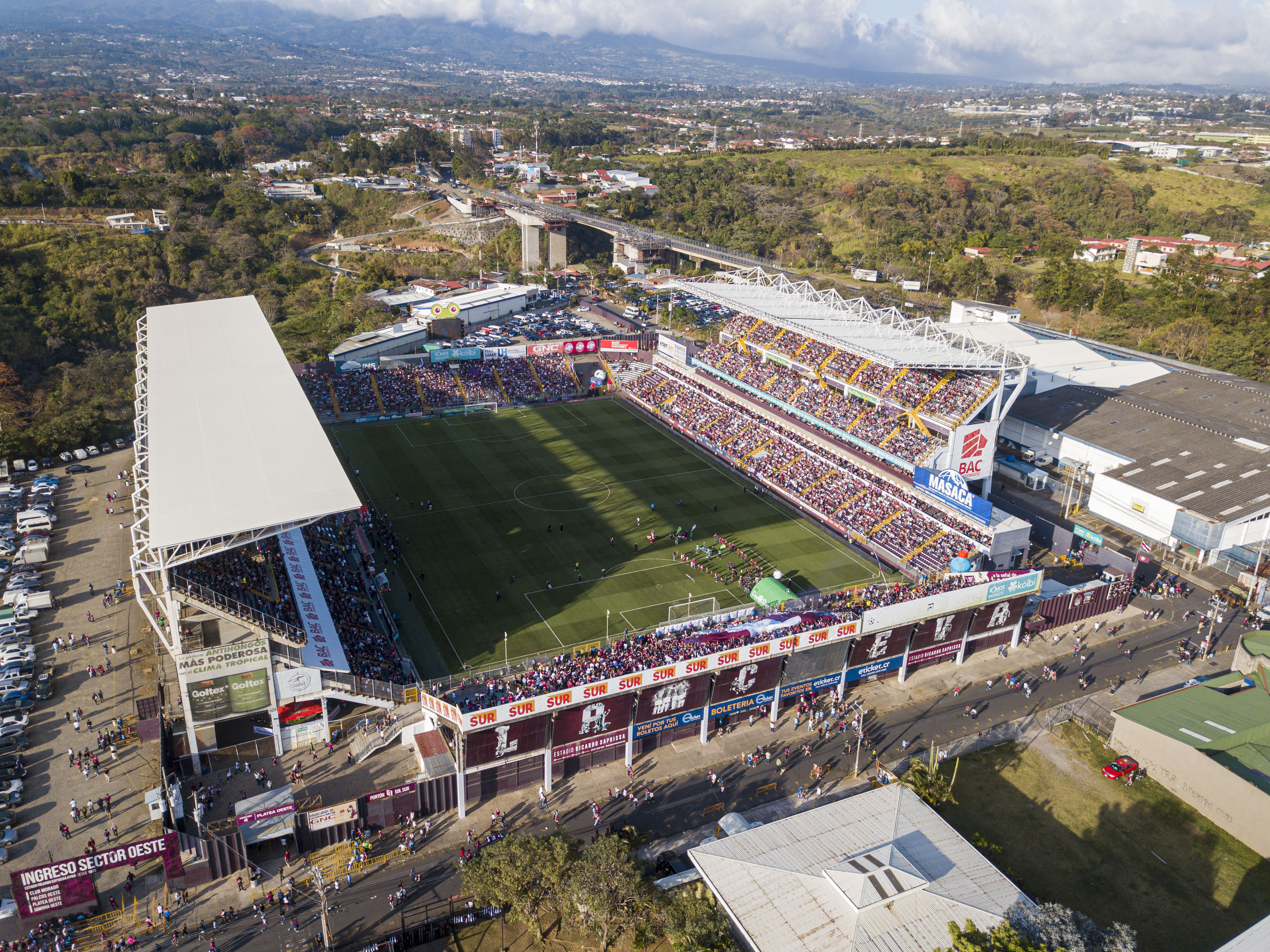
Estadio Ricardo Saprissa Aymá

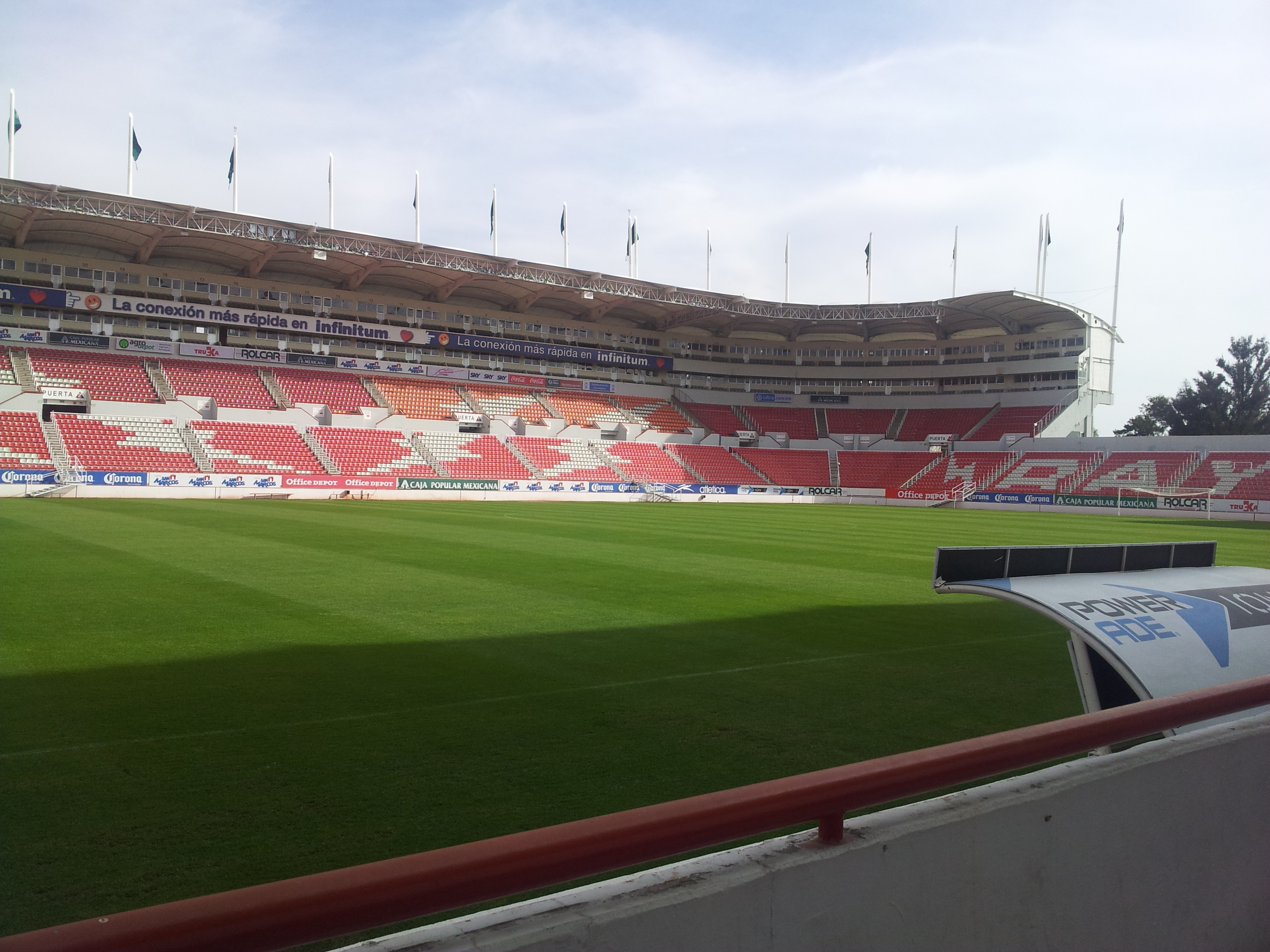
Estadio Victoria

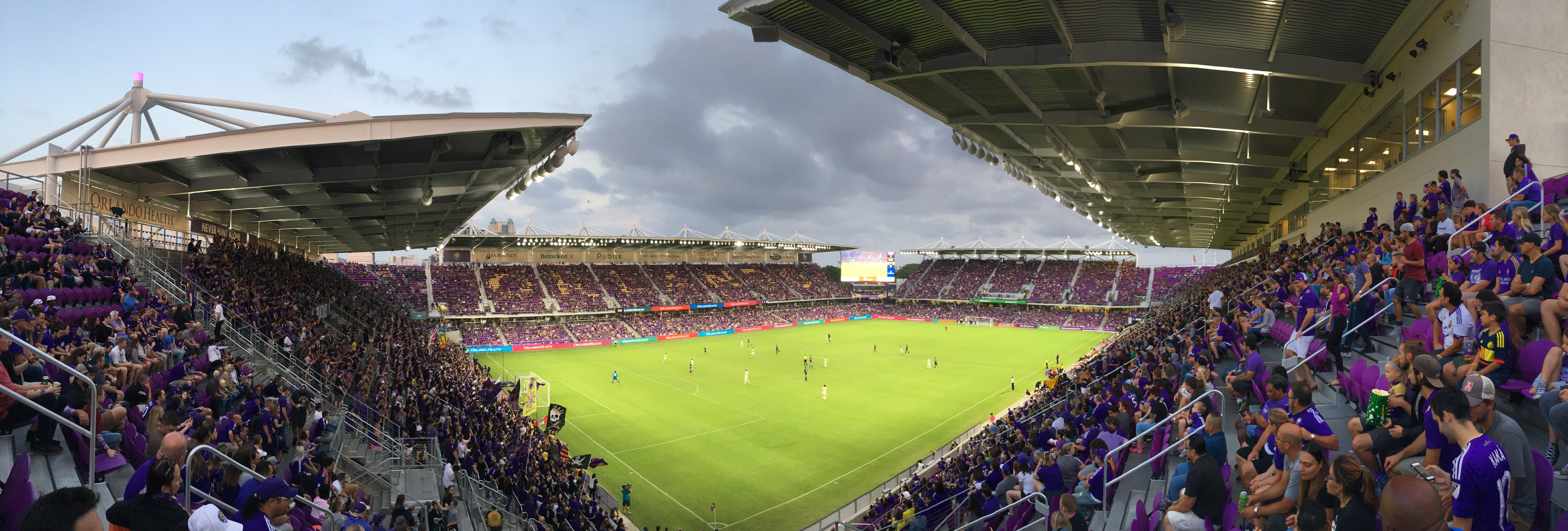
Inter&Co Stadium

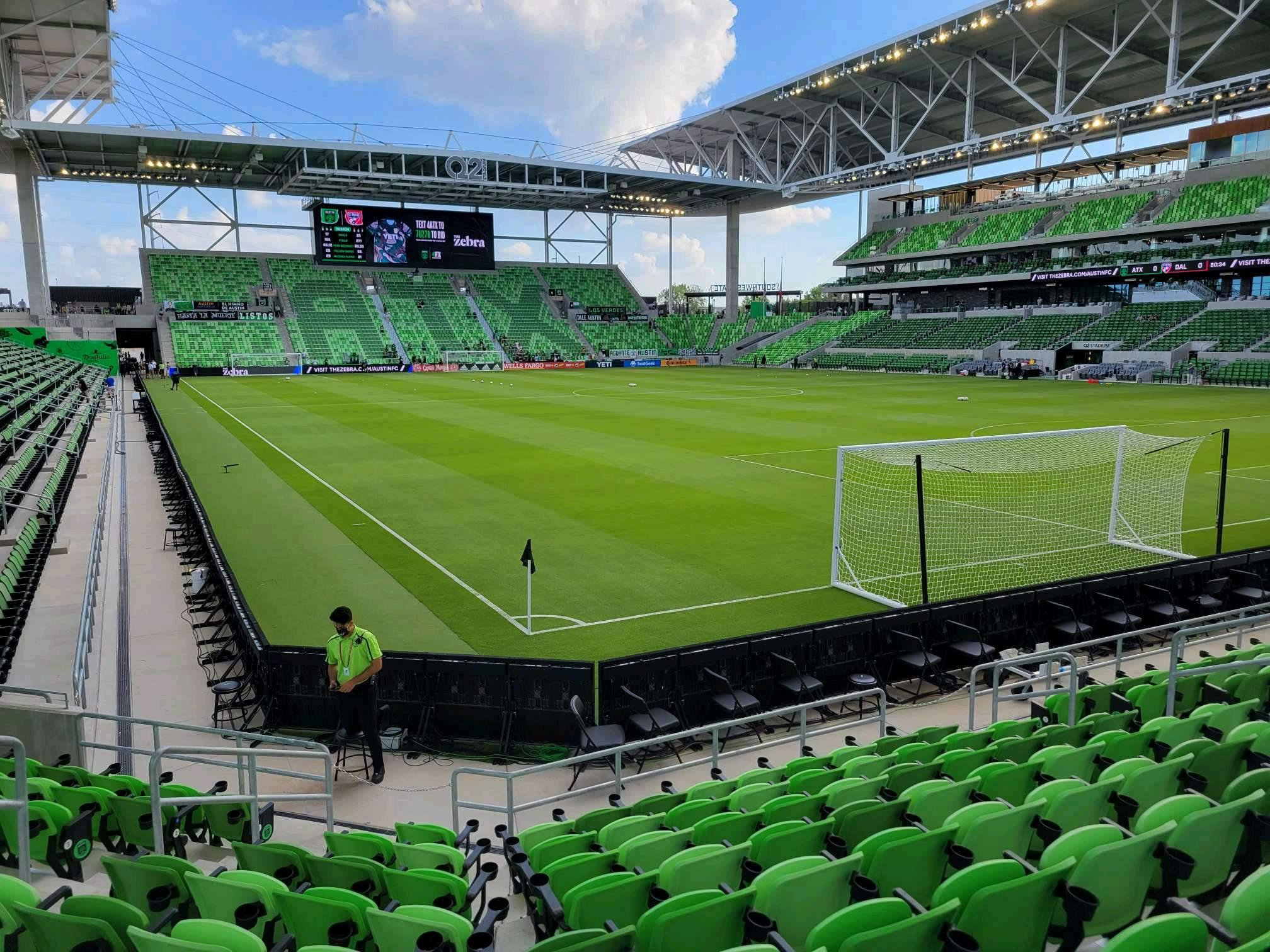
Q2 Stadium

Red Bull Arena

== See also ==
- List of stadiums in Africa
- List of stadiums in Asia
- List of stadiums in Europe
- List of stadiums in North America
- List of stadiums in Oceania
- List of stadiums in South America
- List of North American stadiums by capacity
- List of association football stadiums by country
- Lists of stadiums
