= Baseball in Cuba =

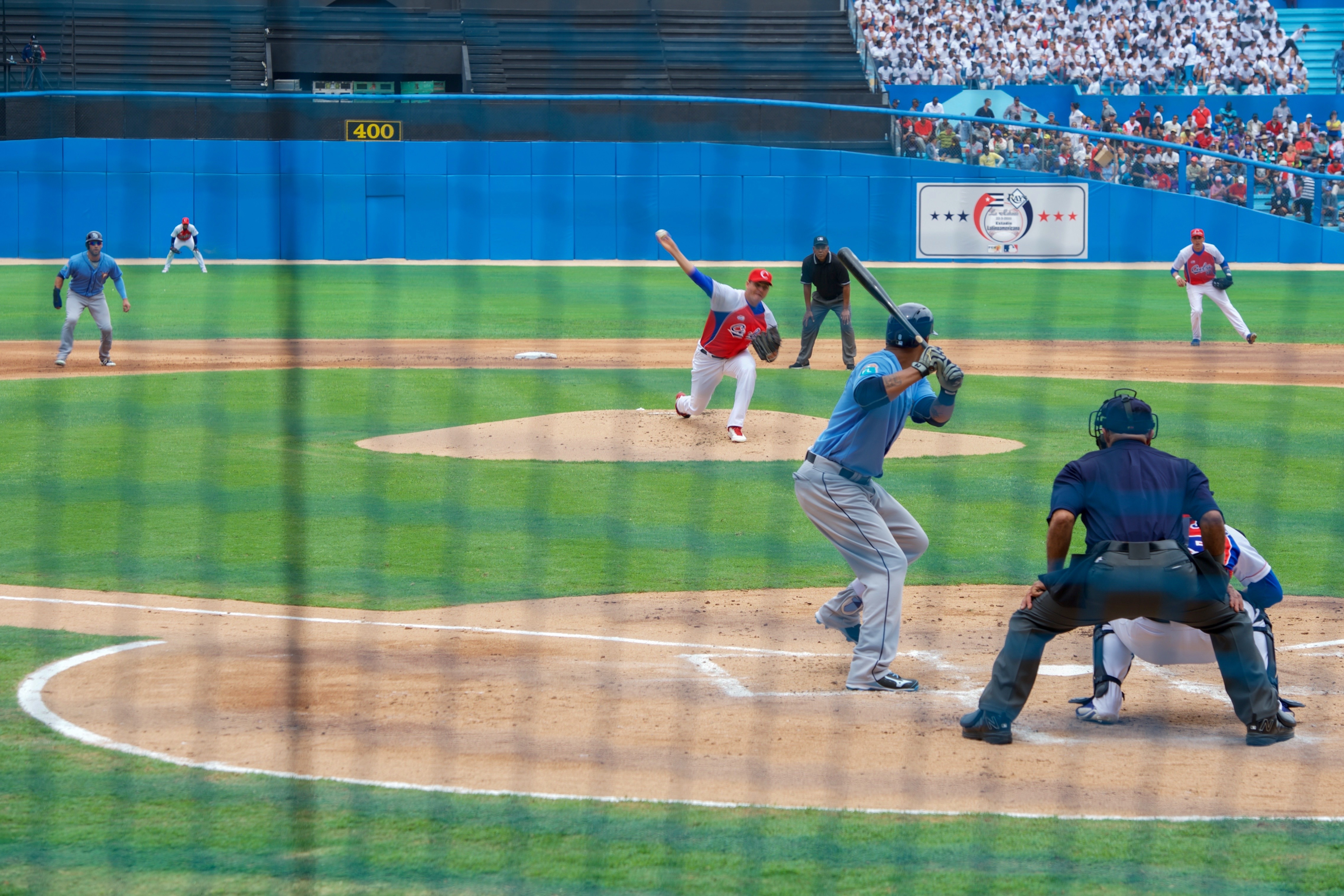
By capacity, Estadio Latinoamericano is the largest baseball stadium in Cuba, and the second largest in the world.

Baseball is the most popular sport in Cuba, followed by association football. Baseball was popularized in Cuba by Nemesio Guillot, who founded the first major baseball club in the country. It became the most played sport in the country in the 1870s, before the period of American intervention.

Despite its American origin, baseball is strongly associated with Cuban nationalism, as it effectively replaced colonial Spanish sports such as bullfighting. Since the Cuban Revolution, the league system in Cuba has been nominally amateur. Top players are placed on the national team, earning money for training and playing in international competitions.

== History ==
=== The early years (1864–1874) ===
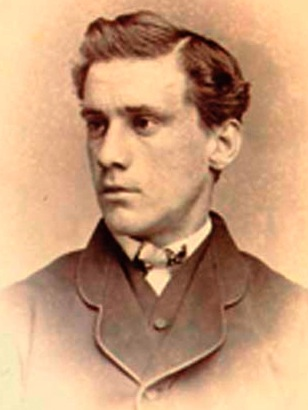
Esteban Bellan was the first Latin American player to play in a Major League in the United States.

Baseball was introduced to Cuba in the 1860s by Cuban students returning from U.S. colleges and American sailors who ported in the country. The sport spread quickly across the island nation after its introduction, with student Nemesio Guillot receiving popular credit for the game's growth in the mid-19th century. Nemesio attended Spring Hill College in Mobile, Alabama, with his brother Ernesto. The two returned to Cuba, and in 1868 they founded the first baseball team in Cuba, the Habana Base Ball Club.

Soon after this, the first Cuban War of Independence spurred Spanish authorities in 1869 to ban the sport in Cuba. They were concerned that Cubans had begun to prefer baseball to bullfights, which Cubans were expected to dutifully attend as homage to their Spanish rulers in an informal cultural mandate. As such, baseball became symbolic of freedom and egalitarianism to the Cuban people. The ban may have also prompted Esteban Bellán, an early Cuban player, to remain in the United States and become the first Latin American player to appear in the major leagues. Bellán played baseball for the Fordham Rose Hill Baseball Club while attending Fordham University (1863–1868). After that he joined the professional Unions of Morrisania, a New York City team, followed by the Troy Haymakers. In 1871 the Haymakers joined the National Association of Professional Base Ball Players, which is regarded by many historians as a major league. Bellán played for them in 1871 and 1872, then moved to the New York Mutuals, another NA team, in 1873.

The first organized match in Cuba took place in Pueblo Nuevo, Matanzas, at the Palmar del Junco, December 27, 1874. It was between Club Matanzas and Club Habana, the latter winning 51 to 9. Bellán played for Habana and hit two home runs.

=== Cuban baseball is organized (1878–1898) ===
In late 1878 the professional Cuban League was founded. At its inception the league consisted of three teams: Almendares, Havana, and Matanzas. Every team played the other two teams four times each. The first game was played on December 29, 1878, with Havana defeating Almendares 21 to 20. Havana, under team captain Bellán, went undefeated in the inaugural season and won the championship. The teams were composed of amateurs and were all-white, however professionalism gradually took hold as teams bid on players to pry them from their rivals.

=== Cuban baseball becomes international (1898–1933) ===
The Spanish–American War brought increased opportunities to play against top teams from the United States. Also, the Cuban League admitted black players beginning in 1900. Soon many of the best players from the North American Negro leagues were playing on integrated teams in Cuba. Beginning in 1908, Cuban teams scored a number of successes in competition against major league baseball teams, behind outstanding players such as pitcher José Méndez and outfielder Cristóbal Torriente (who were both enshrined in the United States' National Baseball Hall of Fame in 2006). By the 1920s, the level of play in the Cuban League was superb, as Negro league stars like Oscar Charleston and John Henry Lloyd spent their winters playing in Cuba. Furthermore, Cuban teams began flocking to the United States, and with it, intertwining Latino and African American baseball cultures. Defeats at the hand of colored teams in Cuba posed a threat to some Americans, one being the American Baseball League head, Ban Johnson, who had said, "We want no makeshift club calling themselves the Athletics to go to Cuba to be beaten by colored teams". This might have limited some opportunities but overall, baseball in Cuba was thriving and incorporating its own twists backed by the multiethnic ties of those who were playing it. It is often said that the United States is to thank for the spreading of baseball across the country, but it is really the citizens of Cuba, who were the ones who had a deep love and passion for the sport, so much so, that they can even be attributed with helping baseball spread to places like the Dominican Republic, Puerto Rico, and Venezuela.

In 1899, the All Cubans, consisting of Cuban League professional players, were the first Latin American team to tour the United States. The team returned in 1902–1905, exposing white Cuban players to U.S. major league and minor league scouts, and introducing black Cuban players to competition against the Negro leagues. Later Negro league teams included the Cuban Stars and the New York Cubans, which were stocked mostly with Cuban or other

=== Amateur baseball in Cuba (1933–1960) ===
Amateur baseball in Cuba was thriving in the 1940s and deepened the organization and maturity of the league. There were several amateur leagues in Cuba, referred to as los amateurs. Many of the leagues were composed of factory or business workers who represented their individual companies. Originally, amateur teams represented exclusive social clubs in the Havana area, such as the Vedado Tennis Club. (In writing about amateur baseball in Cuba, Professor Roberto González Echevarría refers "specifically [to] the game played by social clubs who played in the Amateur League", as opposed to the semi-professional and sugarmill teams.) The growth of amateur baseball can be attributed to the economic recovery in Cuba around 1934. In 1934 there were only 6 teams, but by 1940, that number grew to 18.

In 1954, amateur Dominican baseball became better organized, respected abroad, and very structured which led professional clubs to draw young talent from the amateur leagues in cities throughout Cuba. The removal of some of the talented players in the league only slightly impacted the amateur leagues in Cuban cities. The young and talented team players who remained in the leagues gained physical strength by participating in the amateur games.

One major form of amateur baseball in Cuba was sugarmill baseball. Sugarmill baseball was popularized in the early 1950s. This group of amateurs consisted mainly of players who were workers at the sugarmill. It was often loosely organized and regionally established. Each team represented a different sugarmill, and they would compete against one another. Games were generally played on Sunday and holidays in order to leave weekdays reserved for field work. Players in the league used sugarmill ball as an escape from the harsh working conditions of the mill. During the Golden Age of Cuban League, sugarmill baseball was one of the most important producers of talent.

In Cuba's amateur baseball leagues, some of the greatest moments and players the game has ever produced on the island can be found, along with a high level of unconcealed iniquity. Until 1959 blacks were excluded from the amateur leagues. Segregation is traced back to the start of the 20th century when disagreement among players regarding the professionalization of the game led to a split. The amateur game was the origin of the segregation and remained a sport played among exclusive social clubs and factory workers. Membership in these clubs were restricted to whites, therefore blacks were excluded from amateur baseball and had to play for the semiprofessional teams. Whether the whites-only policy was a direct consequence of American influence on upper-class Cubans, or was a retention from colonial times is difficult to determine.

Fidel Castro was an avid baseball player who pitched for the University of Havana in the 1940's and attended games at El Gran Estadio del Cerro in Havana. In 1959, Castro committed to financing the Havana Sugar Kings, which won the Junior World Series in that year. As president, Castro implemented a system in which ball players could be locally sourced by state-sponsored programs. These programs allowed for young athletes to enhance their abilities. Every two to three years, players would be promoted to different levels based on skill. Parents were encouraged to place particularly talented children in the program at an early age. Children who participated in these programs were sometimes offered amenities such as more comfortable living, opportunities to travel and compete, pocket money, access to better food, etc. Placing a young generation in such state-controlled camps allowed for the regime to foster a new generation of loyalists.

In 1960s the government abolished all professional sports on the island. Sports were viewed as opposing the principles of the Cuban Revolution. With this thought in mind, the ideas of sport were altered to better coincide with the ideology of the Revolution. To reshape baseball was a difficult task. The idea of tradition had to be demolished and rebuilt. Rewriting Cuban baseball history by connecting the president to the glory years of the Amateur Leagues began to take shape and reflect revolutionary ideas. From then on, baseball and sports in Cuba were meant to encourage cooperation among nations, represent national pride, and promote fitness and military preparedness. Through sports, Cubans were able to feel personally involved in the nation building, socialization, and political integration of the revolution. Fidel Castro said, "[w]e can say that our athletes are the children of our Revolution and, at the same time, the standard-bearers of that same Revolution."

In the 1960s, once amateur baseball became the main focus, there was a strong desire to play and participate in sports. Cuban baseball shed its commercial skin and sought out to advance the social and political aims of the revolution via sport. The organization of the game and role baseball led in society was transformed. Changes were revolutionary and discrimination in amateur baseball was abolished. The reorganization of baseball after 1961, the durability and expansion of the structure of baseball, construction of new stadiums, and the production of players are all significant results the Revolution had on Cuban sports. The island has remained the powerhouse of world amateur baseball since this time.

=== Baseball in post-revolutionary Cuba (1961–present) ===
In 1959, the Cuban Revolution ushered in fundamental changes in how Cuban baseball was organized. The revolutionary government made baseball a symbol of excellence and used it to encourage nationalism. Shortly after the revolution, victorious guerrilla leaders demonstrated their Cuban spirit by engaging in exhibition baseball games that included symbolic gestures reinforcing the notion that baseball would be an integral component of post-revolution Cuba. In 1961, the Cuban government replaced the former professional baseball system with new amateur baseball leagues, most prominent among them the Cuban National Series. The reorganization aimed to organize the sport based on a socialist model of sports driven by national ideals rather than money. Revolutionary officials believed that under capitalism, sport is corrupted by profit motive. The perversion of sport was believed to result in the exploitation of the masses.

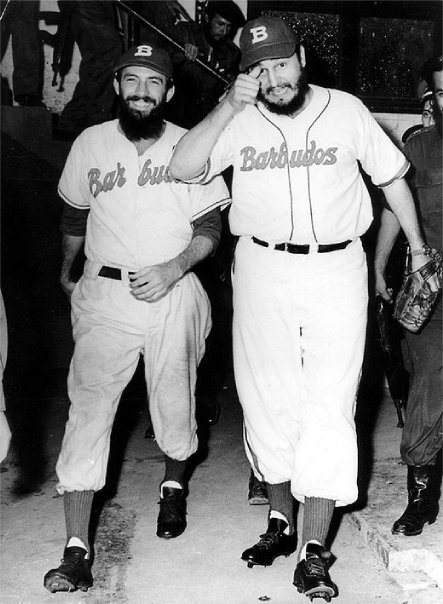
Fidel Castro (right) with Camilo Cienfuegos

The shift from a professional to amateur system was preceded by the introduction of the Institute for Sports, Physical Education and Recreation (INDER). The Cuban government made success in sports competitions a primary goal in the hopes that international sports triumphs could draw positive attention to the Cuban Revolution. In addition to displaying Cuba's leadership to Third World countries, this would give Cubans themselves a sense of pride and feelings of nationalism for the Revolution. It was seen as a way of enhancing the revolutionary government's legitimacy. Sports participation in Cuba was also universalized and thus made an essential component of revolutionary activity. The term coined to describe such a process was masividad, and sports served the purpose to educate and train the Cuban people, and another opportunity to fit in an egalitarian society that conformed to the principles of the revolution. The Cuban people also became healthier due to their participation in sporting related activities, especially those that promoted physical education. Most Cuban sports facilities and the equipment they possess are adequate and meet the needs of the people as thoroughly as possible. INDER has branches at the municipal, provincial and community level and is ultimately responsible for the delivery of all sport and physical education functions; and the coordination of all sport related systems, structures and services delivered by political, health, cultural, community development, education and sports agencies and institutions that traditionally function independently of each other.

Although sport in general underwent a huge transformation after the revolution, it is still imperative to note that baseball continued to play a pivotal role. After all it was Cuba's bloodline and was easy to pick up and play since it required less conditioning and more focus on the crafting skills of hitting, pitching, and strategy. Sports other than baseball retain some popularity in Cuba, including boxing and soccer, and the government continues to consider an athlete in fulfillment his or her duty as a Cuban citizen regardless of the sport pursued. As mentioned earlier, sport in post-revolutionary Cuba was utilized to not only improve health, but in doing so, citizens have become more prepared in-terms of self-defense in light of hostile policies at least in the early days of the revolution by the United States. Baseball, like all other sports in Cuba, was also utilized for political ends. For instance, Cuba has allowed for the Cuba National Baseball team to play in countries abroad such as Nicaragua to benefit flood victims and in Japan as a symbolic gesture to express goodwill for a strong trading partner. Such assistance by Cuba underlies its commitment to socialist internationalism, which still to this day sees a bevy of Cuban sports specialists training and instructing abroad citizens of other nations.

Since the professional system was replaced by amateur leagues, players were not paid as extravagantly as they once were. Although members of the Cuba national team are nominally amateur, As of 1984 they were paid a "'sports leave'" wage determined by their principal occupation during the off-season—often less than US$2000 annually. The situation would get worse in the early 1990s after the collapse of the Soviet Union in 1991, which was Cuba's main trading partner. This led many players to defect to the United States due to deteriorating economic conditions. Amidst such action, even Fidel Castro admitted that it was hard to prevent the baseball stars from defecting. He would later proclaim, "If you have to compete against six million dollars versus three thousand Cuban pesos you cannot win." Other problems included bribery scandals in which coaches and player alike would fix games, which subsequently led to them being banned from baseball in Cuba.

In 2008, Joe Kehoskie, a former baseball agent who represented several dozen Cuban players, told author Michael Lewis, "There's at least half a billion dollars of baseball players in Cuba right now and probably a lot more." By the end of 2014, approximately 30 subsequent Cuban defectors had signed MLB contracts totaling just under $500 million.

==== Resumed exhibitions (1999–present) ====
In 1999, the Cuba national baseball team played a two-game exhibition series against the Baltimore Orioles of Major League Baseball. This marked the first time the Cuba national team played against an MLB team, and the first time an MLB team played in Cuba since 1959. The Orioles won the first game, which was held in Havana, while the Cuba national team won the second game, which was held in Baltimore.

In December 2014, the United States and Cuba began to re-establish diplomatic relations. MLB Commissioner Rob Manfred entered into discussions to hold an exhibition game between an MLB team and the Cuba national team in 2016. The Tampa Bay Rays played the Cuba national baseball team on March 22, 2016, in Havana's Estadio Latinoamericano. The Tampa Bay Rays defeated the Cuba national baseball team, 4 to 1. The game was attended by U.S. President Barack Obama, Cuba President Raul Castro and Rachel Robinson, the widow of Jackie Robinson.

In January 2019, pitcher Matthew McLaughlin joined the Plaza club in Havana's provincial league, believing himself to be the first American to play in Cuba's national baseball system in over 60 years.

In 2017, the World Baseball Softball Confederation (WBSC) introduced a new discipline called Baseball5 for international competition, which is modeled off of a Cuban street baseball variant, cuatro esquinas, which had been played for decades.

== America's effect on baseball in Cuba ==
Baseball was brought into Cuba by those returning from America in the late 1800s. While Americans may not have intended for baseball to become popular in Cuba, the sport had become a large part of the culture not just for the game but for what it represented to Cubans at the time. According to Rob Ruck in his article "Baseball's Global Diffusion", the meaning of the United States to the people of Cuba, "a fresh, democratic vision of [Cubans] future", was transferred to the sport (Ruck 200). However, the racial segregation that was prevalent in the United States in the 1900s affected some people of Cubas ability to play baseball. While in Cuba, there was no racial segregation in the game, dark-skinned and black players were unable to play in any minor or major leagues in the United States. According to Adrian Burgos's journal article titled, "Playing Ball in a Black and White "Field of Dreams": Afro-Caribbean Ballplayers in the Negro Leagues, 1910-1950", "No matter how powerful their swing, fleet their steps, or light their complexions, Afro-Caribbean ballplayers could not escape the United States' racial ideology. The image of the virile African or black man became a prevalent topic or trope during the late nineteenth and twentieth centuries" (Burgos, 71). It was not a matter of skill that kept Cubans and other Afro-Caribbean ballplayers barred from playing in the major leagues, it was only the color of their skin. Not only were they unofficially barred from playing, but they were also painted negatively by the American press. A false rumor had come out that Jose Mendez, a pitcher, had accidentally thrown a fastball to the chest of another Cuban player Jose Figarola, killing him. (Burgos, 73). This rumor was false, but it did not stop the American press from capitalizing on this fallacious tragedy. According to Burgos, "First, note the employment of race ideology to stress the 'danger' that Mendez's physical ability posed to those around him. Even on the diamond, the Afro-Cuban's uncontrollable wildness resulted in the 'instantaneous' death of Figarola, his teammate. Secondly, the open interjection of morality where Mendez became 'the Cuban Demon' andvanced their threat" (Burgos, 73)

Eventually, this was changed through the influence of Caribbean countries and Mexico, the unavoidable skill of dark-skinned and black players, and the shift of racial segregation in the United States. The United States had more influence in the beginning of baseball's journey in the Caribbean but it does not take long for Cuba to take the lead in making changes in baseball from racial segregation to the wages of players.

== National teams ==
The Cuba national team represents Cuba in international baseball. There are also a number of other national teams from the Under-12 team to the Under-18 team. In addition, there is a women's national team that represents Cuba in international women's events.

== Stadiums ==
| # | Stadium | Capacity | City | Tenants | Image |
|---|---|---|---|---|---|
| 1 | Estadio Latinoamericano | 55,000 | Havana | Industriales | |
| 2 | Calixto García Íñiguez Stadium | 30,000 | Holguín | Sabuesos de Holguín | |
| 3 | Estadio Guillermón Moncada | 25,000 | Santiago de Cuba | Avispas de Santiago de Cuba | |
| 4 | Victoria de Girón Stadium | 22,000 | Matanzas | Cocodrilos de Matanzas | |
| 5 | Estadio Augusto César Sandino | 18,000 | Santa Clara | Naranjas de Villa Clara | |
| 6 | Cinco de Septiembre Stadium | 15,600 | Cienfuegos | Elefantes de Cienfuegos | |
| 7 | Estadio Cándido González | 14,000 | Camagüey | Toros de Camagüey | |
| 8 | Nguyen Van Troi Stadium | 14,000 | Guantánamo | Indios de Guantánamo | |
| 9 | José Antonio Huelga Stadium | 13,000 | Sancti Spíritus | Gallos de Sancti Spíritus | |
| 10 | José Ramón Cepero Stadium | 13,000 | Ciego de Ávila | Tigres de Ciego de Ávila | |
| 11 | Mártires de Barbados Stadium | 10,000 | Bayamo | Alazanes de Granma | |
| 12 | Estadio Capitán San Luis | 8,000 | Pinar del Río | Vegueros de Pinar del Río | |
| 13 | Estadio Nelson Fernández | 8,000 | San José de las Lajas | La Habana | |
| 14 | Estadio Cristóbal Labra | 5,000 | Nueva Gerona | Piratas de Isla de la Juventud | |

== Notable players ==
- Edgar Quero (born April 6, 2003) - Catcher for the Chicago White Sox's
- Victor Mesa Jr. (born 2001) - Center Fielder for the Miami Marlins
- Yanquiel Fernández (born 2003) - Right Fielder for the Colorado Rockies
- Lazaro Estrada (born 1999) - Pitcher for the Toronto Blue Jays
- Luis Morales (born 2002) - Pitcher for the Oakland Athletics
- César Prieto (born 1999) - Second Baseman for the St.Louis Cardinals

== See also ==
- Cuban national baseball system
- Pops CB
- History of baseball outside the United States
- List of baseball players who defected from Cuba
- Lists of stadiums

== Bibliography ==
- Bjarkman, Peter C. Baseball with a Latin Beat: A History of the Latin American Game. Jefferson, NC; London: McFarland, 1994.
- González Echevarría, Roberto. The Pride of Havana: A History of Cuban Baseball. New York [u.a.]: Oxford Univ. Press, 1999.
- Jamail, Milton Henry. Full Count: Inside Cuban Baseball. Writing baseball. Carbondale, Ill.; Edwardsville, Ill: Southern Illinois Univ. Press, 2000.
- Klein, Alan M. Sugarball: The American Game, the Dominican Dream. New Haven, Conn: Yale University Press, 1991.
- Pettavino, Paula. "Revolutionary Sport." The Cuba Reader: History, Culture, Politics. Ed. Chomsky, Carr, and Smorkaloff. Durham: Duke University Press, 2004. 192–200. Print.
- Wendel, Tim, Bob Costas, and Victor Baldizon. The New Face of Baseball: The One-Hundred Year Rise and Triumph of Latinos in America's Favorite Sport. New York: Rayo, 2004.
- Yiannakis, Andrew, and Merrill J. Melnick. Contemporary Issues in Sociology of Sport. Champaign, IL: Human Kinetics, 2001.
- Baird, K.E. (2005). "Cuban baseball: Ideology, politics, and market forces." Journal of Sport and Social Issues, 29(2), 164–183.
- Bjarkman, Peter. Diamonds Around the Globe. Greenwood Press. 2005. Print.
- Brown, Bruce. "Cuban Baseball." The Atlantic Monthly, 253(6), 109–114.
- Carter, Thomas F. "New Rules to the Old Game: Cuban Sport and State Legitimacy in the Post-Soviet Era." Identities 15.2 (2008): 194–215.
- Human Resource Development. "Second Meeting of the Human Resource Development (HRD) in Sport Committee." Report, 19–23 March 2003, 1–12.
- Jamail, Milton. Full Count Inside Cuban Baseball. Southern Illinois University, 2000. Print.
- Paula Pettavino & Geralyn Pye. "Revolutionary Sport." The Cuba Reader. Ed. Avita Chomsky, Barry Carr, & Pamela Maria Smorkaloff. Duke University Press. London, 2003. Print.
- Paula Pettavino & Philip Brener. "The Role of Sports in Cuba's Domestic and International Policy." Cuba Briefing Paper, 21(4), 1–11.
- Pettavino, Paula. "Cuban Sports saved by Capitalism?" Report on Sport and Society, 37(5), 27–32.
- Pye, Geralyn. (1986). "The Ideology of Cuban Sport." Journal of Sport History, 13(2), 119–127.
- Steve Fainaru & Ray Sanchez. "Emigration in the Special Period." The Cuba Reader. Ed. Avita Chomsky, Barry Carr, & Pamela Maria Smorkaloff. Duke University Press. London. 2003. Print.
- Wysocki, David. "Fidel Castro's Game: Baseball and Cuban Nationalism." The Chico Historian 19(2009): 143–157.
