= Sport in Cuba =

Due to historical associations and geographical location with the United States, Cubans participate in American popular sports. While most Latin American nations embrace soccer as the national game and pastime, in Cuba things are different. The country is not known for its soccer programs internationally. Instead, baseball is the most popular team sport along with volleyball, wrestling, basketball, sailing, boxing, and trekking.

== History of sport in Cuba ==
Throughout history, sports have played a significant and unique role in societies. Cuba is a prime example of the importance of sport

In Cuba's republic era (pre-revolutionary), sports were used to inspire national pride. The media was tailored to increase national pride by reporting on athletes' victories in international competitions. In addition to national pride, Cuban sports were developed as a "capitalist enterprise". Cuba was influenced by American sports culture, causing it to focus mainly on developing professional sports so that they could be commercialized.

During the Revolution, revolutionary officials used sports to communicate the changes they were making to Cuban society[4]. Sports served to show revolutionary officials' "natural Cubanness". By doing so, they legitimized themselves in the eyes of Cuban citizens and indicated the changes to come to the government and social system. Also, during the revolution, Cuban society redefined itself and its citizens through sports. The strategic management of sports was crucial for revolutionary officials to achieve their goals for the new society.

=== Modern era ===
Post Revolutionary Cuba prides itself on its success in sports. When Fidel Castro rose to power he reshaped Cuban values, norms and attitudes. He expressed that sports should be "the right of the people, not the right of the wealthy." He compared Pre-Revolutionary and Post-Revolutionary Cuba by explaining how, before, only the wealthy could enjoy sports. He also explains that talent in sports comes from hard work, and a strong will. Therefore, professional sports were abolished, replacing them with "amateur leagues and tournaments". This was achieved by eliminating segregated sports facilities and building new ones. By nationalizing sports, the government gained control and directed all sports activity. Cuba strayed from its American influence of promoting individualism in sports. Instead, it opted to implement "collective, nationalistic values".

In modern Cuban society, sports and physical education begin when a child is only 45 days old. The mothers are taught to exercise their children's limbs and massage their muscles to keep them healthy. Children are taught at a later age to play games that resemble physical exercise.

In 1961, two years after the Revolution, the National Institute of Sport, Physical Education and Recreation (INDER) was created. This is the governing branch of all sports and recreation in Cuba. INDER argued that professional sports exploited and disconnected athletes from the true spirit of sports. Sports should be about motivating people to participate in them and develop morals. Therefore, INDER developed all of the current sports and education programs in place today, including the EIDE, the program that finds naturally talented young adults and enrolls them into sports-oriented secondary schools. All primary and secondary schools in Cuba teach sports and physical education as a compulsory subject. There are five sports taught in all standard secondary schools: track and field, basketball, baseball, gymnastics, and volleyball. The students who excel in a certain sport usually find themselves competing in the Cuban summer Junior Olympics, where the EIDE sees their talent and recruits them to a specialized school that caters to just their sport.

More than 27 of these specialized schools are located on the Isle of Youth, a 2,200 square km island to the south of Cuba. Each school enrolls about 600 students. Most of them are semi-boarding schools where the students board a boat to the island every Sunday evening at the beginning of the week and return every Friday evening at the end. The schools are spread out across the island and have citrus groves in between them. All of the students are required to put in 3 hours of work a day picking or canning fruit.

Every school in Cuba participates in the Junior Olympic Program, which was established in 1963. The competition usually commences in July. Many of the standard secondary schools only compete in the sports for which they have teams. The games have a traditional ladder system where first, local schools compete, then the district winners will compete, and finally the regional winners will compete. For team sports, the winning teams will move on, and the best players from all of the losing teams form a new tethatich moves on with the winners; this, way no single great player will be tossed out because of a bad team. As of 1978, the Cuban Junior Olympics involved 20 sports: chess, weightlifting, athletics, tennis, football, table tennis, basketball, gymnastics, modern gymnastics, swimming, synchronized swimming, diving, volleyball, water polo, cycling, fencing, judo, roller derby, roller hockey, pistol shooting, baseball, and wrestling.

INDER has many programs, including the National Institute for Sports Medicine, the National Coaches program, and the National Physical Education Institute. All of these were developed during the relatively strong economic period of 1960–1990. The Special Period of the 1990s–2000s created many special challenges for INDER, including budget cutbacks and a limited amount of electricity, which led to blackouts in the early 1990s. As a result, many of the night sporting events were canceled to preserve electricity.

Cuba's new sports program allows the best players to retire early and take up position on teams in other countries. These other countries hire them due to Cuba's success in training winning athletes. These players earn a large salary, with about 80% of it going directly to the Cuban government. The players then pocket the other 20%, an amount greater than the average earnings of a Cuban resident. However, this outflow of the best athletes and trainers began to take its toll when in 1997 Cuba ended its 10-year, 152-game, winning-streak at the baseball International Cup after losing to Japan 11 to 2. After this, Cuba began to offer material incentives like houses and cars to good players to keep them from playing for other countries. These offerings were not meant to keep completely talented Cubans from leaving the country, but instead to keep the system balanced. By 2007 there were 50 nations around the world employing several hundred Cuban sports trainers and coaches.

Through these sports programs and collaborations, Cuba has been able to show its success by helping other countries. Assisting other countries gives Cuban citizens a sense of national pride and faith that their country is strong enough to support both themselves and others. This is especially seen when the coaches and athletes are successful in another country as they are the product of the programs developed by the Cuban government. In addition, through international competitions, people around the world can observe the difference between socialist and other government systems. The hope is that through the success of sports, other countries will see the superior system of government that Cuba has in place. This internationalism that Cuba has strived for embodies the spirit of the Cuban Revolution as it seeks solidarity not only within Cuba but outside of it.

Sports in Cuba have symbolized many things, including national pride and success. In addition to symbolizing success in post-revolutionary Cuba, the government campaigned for mass participation in national sporting events, which became a symbol of "social cohesion and national pride". Sports were used to "legitimize and promote its achievements" in revolutionary Cuba, such as social cohesion. This can be seen in INDER, as one of the ways the government used it was as a career path for the athletes in the new national sports leagues to obtain prestigious roles in the government ministry. By doing so, sports brought "nationalist values and non-monetary rewards together in support of the development of the country". Through sports, Cuba has created a reward system that is not of monetary value but gives opportunities in the state for the players. As a result, Cuba is able to both develop the country and encourage national solidarity.

The athletes who participated in Cuban sports were also seen as a symbol. After the revolution and abolishment of professional sports, athletes were no longer considered commodities. Instead, they were seen as a part of the socialist effect on the development of human potential. This is especially seen with baseball players in Cuba, as it is their official sport. Baseball players have always been seen as a symbol of the revolution due to its link to "Cubanness". Under the watchful eye of the country, every play or action done by baseball players on the field is seen as the player's commitment to the "socialist project".

Currently, Cuba has had increasing issues with social and racial inequalities due to the diminishing quality of the social services provided by the government. However, these social services, such as health care and education, are essential to maintaining social cohesion in Cuba. Sports is another social service that citizens in Cuba can use as a path upward in society. Sports are important for maintaining social unity in Cuba.

== Boxing ==
Aside from traditional cockfighting, other gambling sports, and baseball; boxing was one of the most popular sports in pre-Revolutionary Cuba.

Boxing is still very popular on the island today. In 1992, there were over 16,000 boxers on the island. Across Cuba today there are 494 boxing coaches and 185 facilities. Of the 99,000 athletes in Cuba currently, 19,000 are boxers, including 81 of Olympic competence, with only twelve making the Olympic team.Professional boxing in Cuba returned after a 60-year ban in April 2022.Most boxing in Cuba is currently governed by the Cuban Boxing Federation.

== Baseball ==
Baseball is the most popular sport in Cuba; 62% of the population plays it. Baseball is the official sport of Cuba. Baseball5, which was introduced in 2017 by the World Baseball Softball Confederation (WBSC), is inspired by the Cuban street baseball variant cuatro esquinas.

== Beach volleyball & volleyball ==
Cuba featured a women's national team in beach volleyball that competed at the 2018–2020 NORCECA Beach Volleyball Continental Cup.

The most famous and known player is Melissa Vargas. She is currently playing for Turkey and will take place in Turkish National Volleyball team.

== Athletics ==
There are a wide variety of popular sports in Cuba. For instance, baseball, which became highly popular starting in the 1870s, when Nemesio Guillot started the first baseball club in the country. Chess is an example of an international game that gathered tremendous amounts of popularity in Cuba. This surge in popularity is attributed to chess grandmaster José Raul Capablanca. It became a very important sport in Cuba, to the point where it is part of the elementary school curriculum.

== Basketball ==
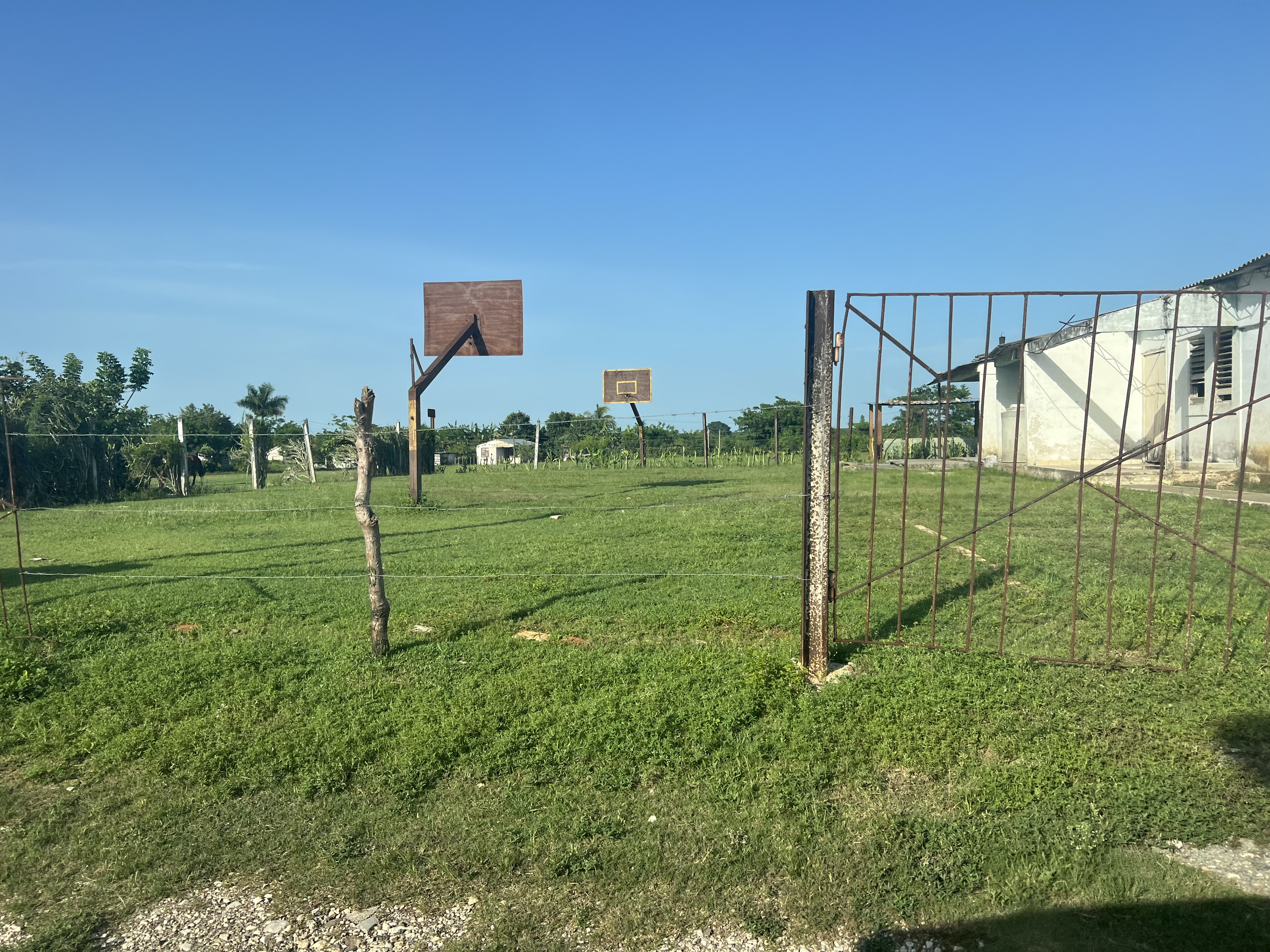
A basketball court in rural Cuba

Basketball is one of the top sports in Cuba, yet it is not as popular as baseball and boxing. The Cuban national basketball team won the bronze medal in basketball at the 1972 Summer Olympics after defeating Italy in their last match.

== Cricket ==
Cricket is a relatively small sport in Cuba. Castro believed that young people on the island were becoming too Americanized and wanted Cuba to feel more affinity with the Caribbean. UK Sport, the body responsible for promoting and supporting sport across Britain, answered a request from Cuba's sports chiefs and provided money for a fact-finding mission which it hoped would lead to a four-year plan to develop Cuban cricket. Cricket also has a minor presence in the country because of the diaspora from the cricket-playing islands of the Caribbean.

== Wrestling ==
Cuba had the strongest Greco-Roman wrestling team in the Western Hemisphere and one of the strongest teams in the world. They claimed the team championship title numerous times at the Pan American Wrestling Championships, Pan American Games, Central American and Caribbean Games. The Cuban freestyle wrestling team in its achievements is second only to the United States national team in the Americas.

== Stadiums in Cuba ==
Stadium	Sport	Capacity
Estadio Latinoamericano	Baseball	55,000
Estadio Panamericano	Athletics	34,000
Calixto García Íñiguez Stadium	Baseball	30,000
Estadio Pedro Marrero	Association football	30,000
Estadio Guillermón Moncada	Baseball	25,000
Victoria de Girón Stadium	Baseball	22,000
Estadio Augusto César Sandino	Baseball	18,000
Cinco de Septiembre Stadium	Baseball	15,600
Estadio Cándido González	Baseball	14,000
Nguyen Van Troi Stadium	Baseball	14,000
José Antonio Huelga Stadium	Baseball	13,000
Estadio Universitario Juan Abrantes	Association football	10,000
Mártires de Barbados Stadium	Baseball	10,000
