= Fearon =

Fearon may refer to:

People

- Douglas Fearon (born 1942), American medical immunologist
- Edward Fearon (1859–1933), Canadian politician and rancher
- George R. Fearon (1883–1976), President pro tem of the New York State Senate 1931–1932
- Henry Fearon (1802–1885), an English clergyman
- James Fearon (born c. 1963), American political scientist
- James S. Fearon (1849–1920), Chairman of the Shanghai Municipal Council
- Joel Fearon (born 1988), British sprinter and bobsledder
- John Turner Fearon (1869–1937), first editor of the Sunday Mercury
- Prof Kenneth Fearon (1960–2016), Scottish cancer specialist
- Megan Fearon (born 1991), British politician
- Phil Fearon (born 1956), British record producer
- Ray Fearon (born 1967), British stage actor
- William Robert Fearon (1892–1959), Irish politician and academic

Other

- Fearon Publishers, a US publishing company based in Belmont, California
- R v Fearon, a Supreme Court of Canada case on warrantless search of cellphones
- Estadio Roy Fearon, a football (soccer) stadium in Puerto Barrios, Izabal, Guatemala

== See also ==
- Feron, a Marvel comics character
- Louise Féron, a French singer
