= Izabal JC =

Association football club in Guatemala

- Full name: Izabal Juventud Católica
- Founded: 1951
- Ground: Estadio Roy Fearon
- Capacity: 8,500
- Manager: (Guatemala) Edwin Rafael Rosales Fajardo
- League: Segunda División de Ascenso
- 2021 Clausura Grupo A: 4th

Izabal Juventud Católica, also known as Juca de Izabal, is a Guatemalan football club based in Puerto Barrios, Izabal Department.

Nicknamed Los Tiburones (the Sharks), they play their home games in the Estadio Roy Fearon.

== History ==
Izabal were founded in 1951. Most recently they have again been playing in the Primera División Group "A" or "B", but got relegated after the 2009/2010 season.

== Players ==
=== Current squad ===
Note: Flags indicate national team as defined under FIFA eligibility rules; some limited exceptions apply. Players may hold more than one non-FIFA nationality.

No.	Pos.	Nation	Player
—		BLZ	Woodrow West
—		GUA	Juan Humberto Flores
—		GUA	Gilbert Ellington
—		GUA	Elio Donado
—		GUA	Gerson Alvárez
—		GUA	Marlon Murray
—		GUA	Erick Cabrera
—		GUA	Walter Juárez
—		GUA	James Emc
—		GUA	Cornelio Kerr
—		GUA	Elio Avila
—		GUA	Kenny León
—		GUA	Luis Fernando Bonilla
—		GUA	Manuel Chacón
—		GUA	Nery Estrada
—		GUA	José Octavio Gutiérrez
—		GUA	Fernando Chacón
—		GUA	Erick Godoy

No.	Pos.	Nation	Player
—		GUA	Wilder Alvárez
—		GUA	Héctor González Velasquez
—		GUA	Byron Jiménez
—		PAR	Julio Manuel González
—		PAR	Justo Meza
—		GUA	Christian Gardiner
—		COL	Alexander Montaño
—		HON	José Ramón Rodríguez
—		GUA	Eduardo Velíz
—		GUA	Estuardo Constanza
—		GUA	José Miguel Ortega
—		GUA	Marvin Villagrán
—		COL	Nelson Riascos
—		GUA	Erickson Acajabón
—		GUA	Kendry Zuñiga
—		GUA	Faustino Arzú
—		GUA	José Federico Ruíz
—		GUA	Kendell Baños
