= Cuscatlán Stadium =

Stadium in San Salvador

Estadio Cuscatlán
- El Coloso de Monserrat "The Colossus of Monserrat"

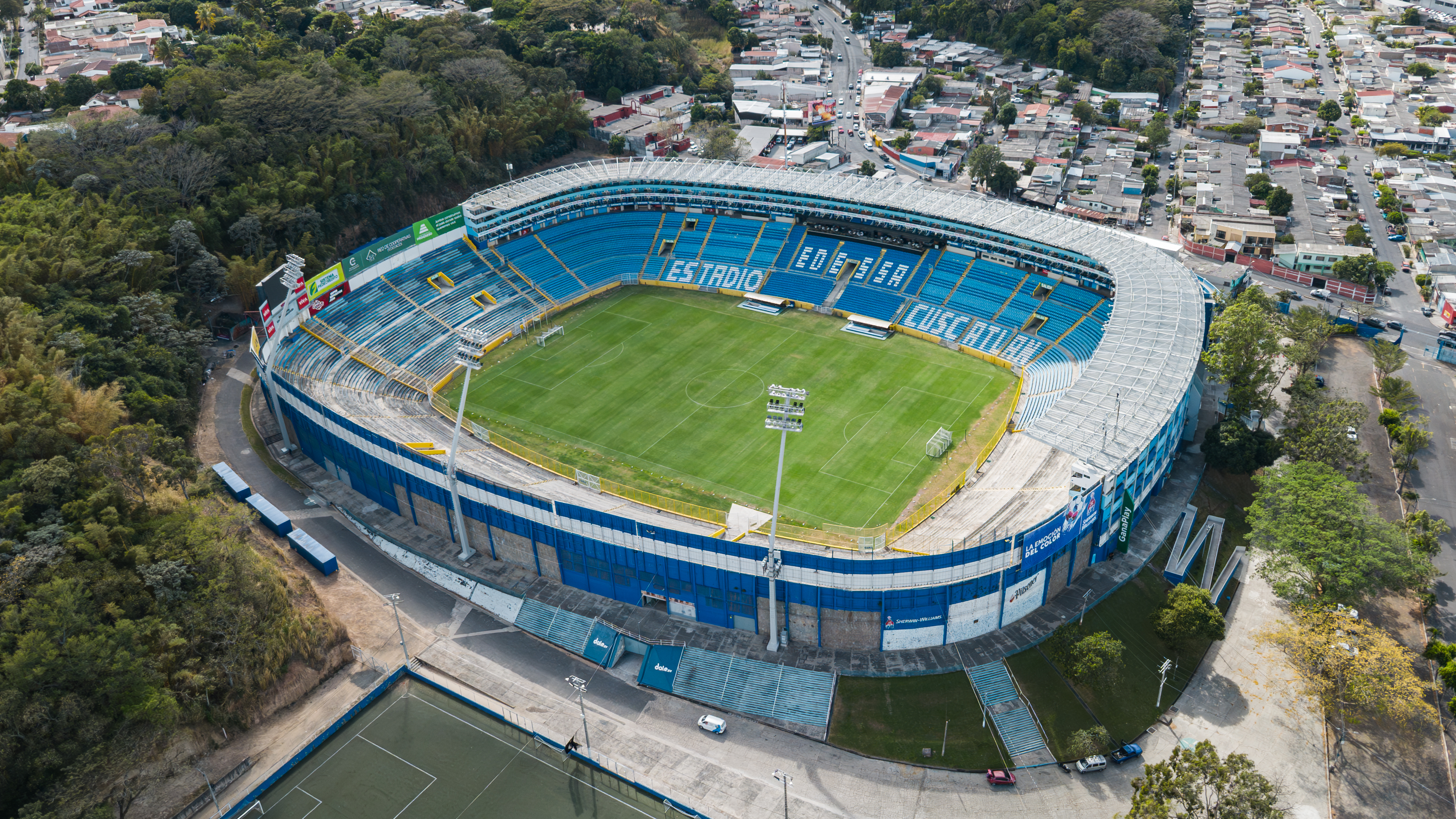
- Interactive map of Estadio Cuscatlán
- Full name: Monumental Estadio Cuscatlan
- Location: San Salvador, El Salvador
- Coordinates: 13°40′52″N 89°13′21″W
- Owner: EDESSA
- Operator: EDESSA
- Capacity: 44,836
- Executive suites: 560
- Surface: Lawn
- Scoreboard: digital and electronic
- Record attendance: 55,000
- Field size: 107 m × 68.5 m (351 ft × 225 ft)
- Field shape: Lawn and French drain

Construction
- Groundbreaking: 24 March 1971
- Built: 19 October 1975
- Opened: 24 July 1976
- Renovated: 2007–2011
- Cost: SV₡4,800,000
- Architects: López Muñoz and Architects.
- Project manager: EDESSA
- Structural engineers: López Muñoz and Architects.
- Services engineer: Simán S. A.
- General contractor: Simán S. A.
- Main contractors: Technical Construction, Investment and Securities S.A.

Tenants
- El Salvador national football team (1976–2023); Alianza (2002–2012, 2013–2014, 2015–2023); Atlético Marte (2017–2023); San Salvador (2002–2008); Zacatecoluca (2026)

The Cuscatlán Stadium (Spanish: Estadio Cuscatlán) is a football stadium located in the city of San Salvador, El Salvador. It was inaugurated in 1976. It can hold 53,400 spectators, making it the Association Football stadium with the largest spectator capacity in Central America and the Caribbean. The stadium has undergone several renovations, including in 1997; 2007; 2008; 2015, with the change of colors alluding to the country's flag (blue and white); and the most recent in 2020, with the installation of a new screen 100 m^{2} 4K LED and 54 new 1,500-watt metal halide luminaires with a capacity of 1,000 luxes, and an automated irrigation system.

== History ==
Cuscatlán stadium was first developed as a replacement to what at the time was El Salvador's largest stadium, Estadio Nacional de la Flor Blanca (now known as Estadio Jorge "Mágico" González). Its creation was made possible by EDESSA (Estadios Deportivos de El Salvador) who in 1969 first proposed the idea of a new national stadium.

Construction began on 24 March 1971, with then-president of El Salvador General Fidel Sánchez Hernández laying the first stone. After 5 years of building, the stadium was opened and held its first game on 24 July 1976. This day saw German Bundesliga champions Borussia Mönchengladbach play the El Salvador national team, with the match ending 2–0 to the German side.

On 25 May 1978, EDESSA agreed to and signed a 599-year lease of the stadium to CLIMA (Asociación de Clubes de Liga Mayor A'). As a result, CLIMA is now the operator of the stadium, and controls what events are held there.

== The stadium ==
The stadium, with a capacity of 53,400 is the largest football venue in El Salvador and Central America.

It was announced on 16 November 2007 that Estadio Cuscatlán would become the first football stadium in Central America and Caribbean to have a large LED screen where the supporters can view the action. The screen is 40 meters in height and width and was completed in March 2008.

The modernization also extends to the pitch, which includes:

- French drainage system to allow water to flow off the grounds when it rains excessively
- Six sprinkler systems to self water the grounds
- Dugouts for both home and away teams, each with its own lavatory
- Imported high quality grass
- Various V.I.P. boxes

=== Facilities and capacity ===
The stadium's capacity has been the topic of much dispute, with many saying that its official capacity is not accurate. As the stadium only has seats available in certain sections, it is difficult to estimate the maximum capacity when determining how many spectators could fit into the sections without seats. The seating capacity is estimated to be between 45,000 and 53,400 people. FIFA regulates the capacity, setting a maximum of about 45,000.

The stadium has the following distribution on its premises:

Localidad	Color	FIFA	EDESSA
Platea	Sky Blue	2,013	3,000
Northern Tribune	Brown	1,672	2,500
South Tribune	Blue	1,709	2,500
North Shadow	Green	4,900	5,000
South Shadow	Yellow	2,500	4,000
North Preference Sun	Black	4,220	5,200
South Preference Sun	Orange	6,044	7,800
General Sun	Vermilion	16,278	18,000
Box	White	3,400	3,400
Extras	Walls	2,000	2,000
	TOTAL	44,836	53,400

Cuscatlán Stadium is the only stadium nationwide that meets FIFA requirements for international matches.

=== The grounds ===
The stadium itself sits on an area of land roughly 15 square blocks (30 hectares) in size. Not only does it accommodate the stadium itself, with its parking lot (8,500 cars capacity), but also two other football pitches. One of these is used for training by club sides to limit damage to the stadium ground itself. The other ground is used for junior football.

=== Events ===
Although Cuscatlán Stadium was primarily built to be just a football stadium, it is also used for other events. Apart from football, it is used for concerts, cultural events, religious events, and political rallies. In 2005, Colgate broke the World Record of most people brushing their teeth at the same time in this stadium.

- El Salvador national football team
- FIFA World Cup qualification
- UNCAF Nations Cup 1995–2007

== Disaster ==
In 2023, during a game between Alianza F.C. and C.D. FAS in the Primera División de Fútbol de El Salvador an incident occurred which resulted in a crowd crush of fans in the stadium.

According to reports, fans had been sold fake tickets for the game and angry fans attempted to pull down the barricades at the stadiums at the entrance. Twelve people were killed and dozens of others injured.

Authorities were looking at pressing charges against those responsible for the event and the Salvadoran Soccer Federation suspended all the following day's matches in the country.

== See also ==
- List of stadiums in Central America and the Caribbean
