= Kaibil Balam Stadium =

Football stadium in Huehuetenango, Guatemala

Coordinates: 15.3205°N 91.4816°W

Kaibil Balam Stadium (Spanish: Estadio Kaibil Balam) is a football stadium located in Huehuetenango, Guatemala. It is the former home to the football club Deportivo Xinabajul. Its capacity is 10,000.

In recent years, the stadium has been the site of a temporary market.
