= Nemisio Guillo =

Cuban baseball player

Nemisio Guillot was a Cuban baseball player. He is credited with bringing the first bat and baseball to Cuba in 1864 after being schooled at Spring Hill College in Mobile, Alabama, United States.

By 1868, Nemisio along with his brother Ernesto, and a number of their contemporaries had founded a baseball team called the Habana Base Ball Club. That club allegedly defeated the crew of an American schooner anchored at the Matanzas's harbor for repairs. However, the team did not have much time to celebrate this exploit and actually had to go underground because the Ten Years' War broke out and the Spanish colonial authorities outlawed the game.

== See also ==
- Baseball in Cuba
