= Puerto Bani Stadium =

Puerto Baní Stadium (tentative)
- Location: Baní, Dominican Republic
- Capacity: 25,000

Construction
- Groundbreaking: 2011 (planned)
- Opened: 2012
- Architect: Populous
- Project manager: Brent B. Woodson

Puerto Baní Stadium is a stadium in Baní, Dominican Republic. It is primarily used for baseball and has a capacity of 25,000 spectators. The stadium was opened in 2012.

It is part of a larger development project located 40 miles outside Santo Domingo.
