= Louise Féron =

French singer

Louise Féron is a French rock singer. Her career started in 1988 with her first self-titled album Louise Féron. The album was produced by John Cale (ex-Velvet Underground) with music composed by Dominique Laboubée (leader of band Dogs), and participation of Les Wampas guitarist, Philippe Almosnino.

== Discography ==
- Louise Féron (1991, Virgin)
- Singulière et Plurielle (1997, L.P.G.)
- Le Passé Revenant (2010, Tarantula Music)
