= José Ramón Cepero Stadium =

Coordinates: 21.847694°N 78.770288°W

José Ramón Cepero Stadium is a multi-use stadium in Ciego de Ávila, Cuba. It is currently used mostly for baseball games and is the home stadium of Ciego de Ávila Tigres. The stadium holds 13,000 people.
