= Roy Fearon Stadium =

Stadium in Puerto Barrios, Guatemala

Coordinates: 15°43′31″N 88°35′40″W

Estadio Municipal Roy Fearon
- Interactive map of Estadio Municipal Roy Fearon
- Location: Puerto Barrios, Guatemala
- Owner: Municipality of Puerto Barrios
- Capacity: 8,500
- Surface: Grass
- Field size: 104 m × 68 m (341 ft × 223 ft)

Construction
- Opened: 1952
- Renovated: 2025
- Expanded: 2025

Tenant
- Izabal JC (1952–present)

The Estadio Municipal "Roy Fearon" is a football stadium located in Puerto Barrios, Guatemala. It is home to third division club Izabal JC (Los Tiburones). Its capacity is 8,500. The venue bears its name in honour of local track and field athlete Roy Alfonso Fearon.

== See also ==
- Lists of stadiums
