= Traditional games of Cuba =

Cuba has several traditional games.

== Traditional games ==
=== Las Bolas ===
Las Bolas involves participants shooting marbles to make them get as close to each other as possible.[2]

=== Cuban dominoes ===
Cuban dominoes is a game played by two teams of two players in which the goal is to reach a certain score using their dominoes as fast as possible.

=== El quemado ===
The game is similar to dodgeball.

=== Fútbol de tres ===
This game is a type of street football played by two teams of three players.

== Bat-and-ball games ==
=== Cuatro esquinas ===
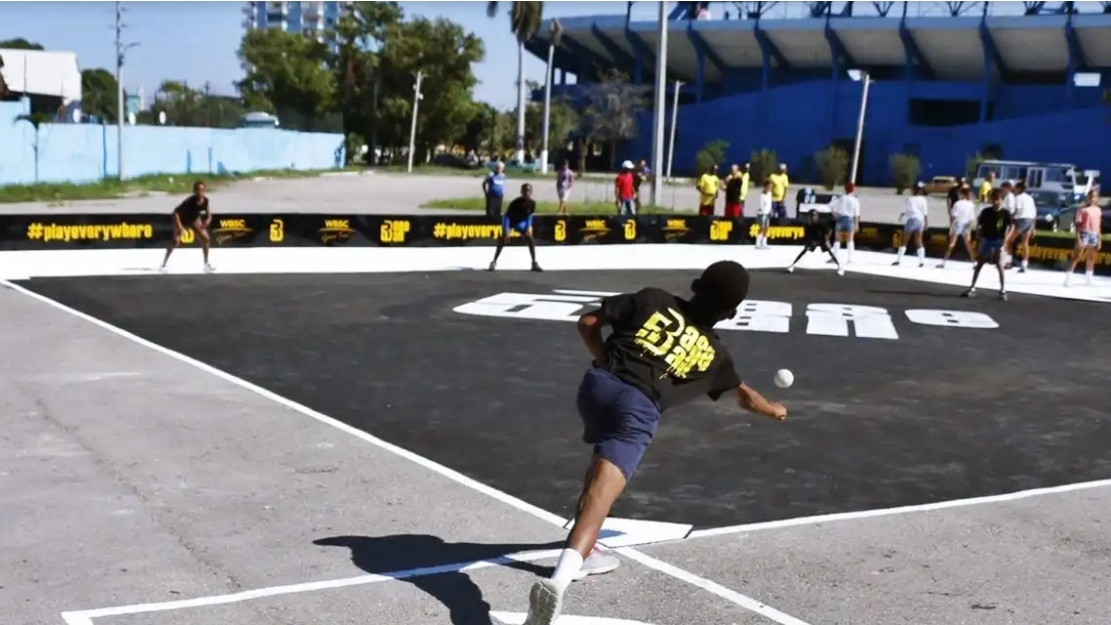
Baseball5, inspired by cuatro esquinas, being played in Havana.

Cuatro esquinas (transl. four corners) is a variation of baseball in which the only equipment used is a rubber ball. Players hit the ball using their hands and then attempt to run around the four corners of a square to score, with gameplay being similar to baseball. Baseball5 is an internationally played sport invented by the World Baseball Softball Confederation which is partially based on this game.

=== Juego del taco ===
El juego del taco (transl. game involving a bat) is a game with similarities to baseball and street cricket.
