= Estadio Capitán San Luis =

Sports venue in Pinar del Río, Cuba

Coordinates: 22°25′25″N 83°41′34″W

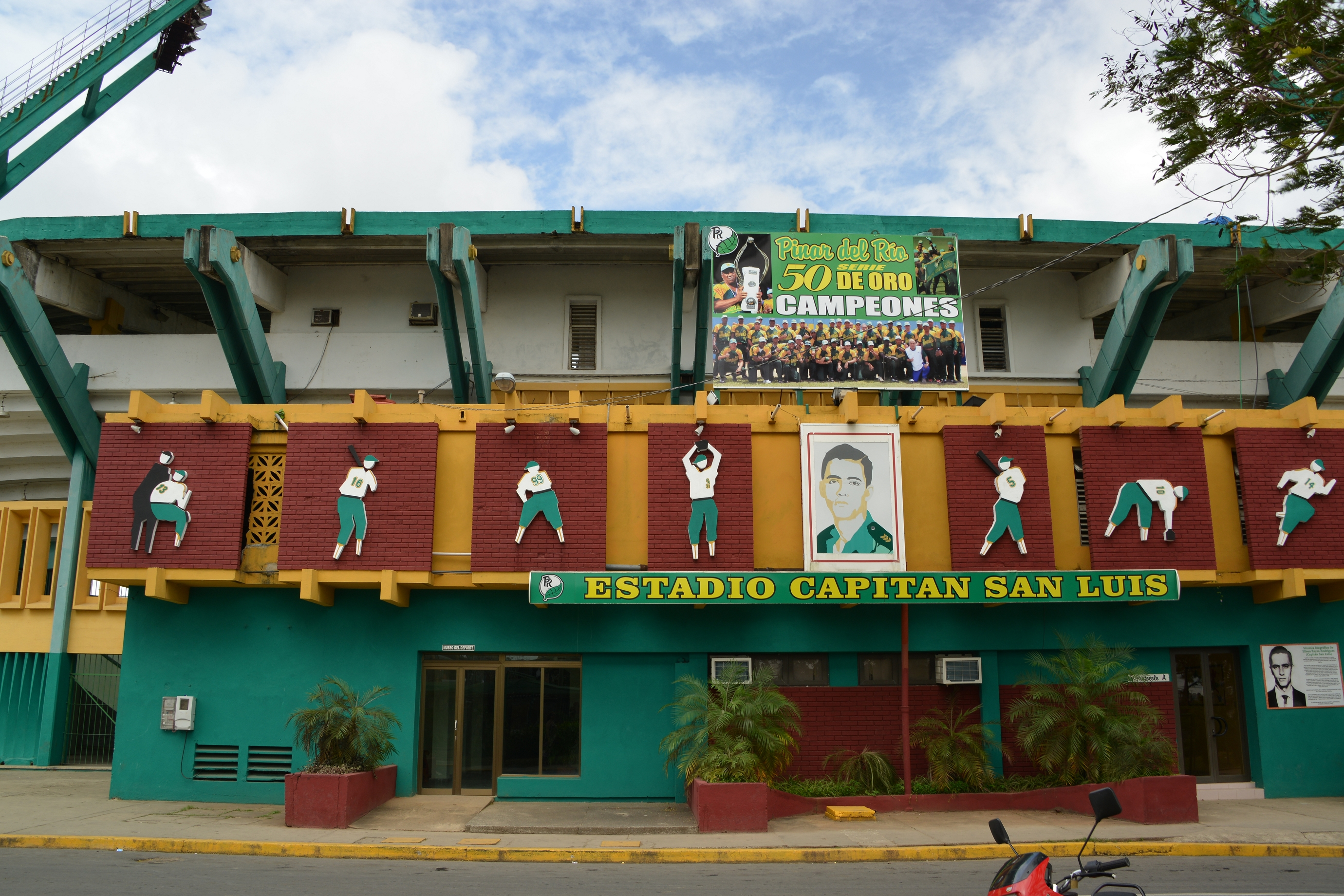
Exterior of the stadium in January 2014

Estadio Capitán San Luis is a multi-use stadium in Pinar del Río, Cuba.

== History ==
Inaugurated the 19 of January 1969, the stadium has a capacity of 8,000 spectators. The stadium is mostly used for baseball games and is the home of the Pinar del Rio Baseball team. Previously, it was the home of Vegueros and Forestales baseball teams and FC Pinar del Rio, a football team. The football team's home field is now "La Bombonera" in San Cristóbal.
