= Cinco de Septiembre Stadium =

Stadium in Cienfuegos, Cuba

Coordinates: 22°7′51″N 80°26′39″W

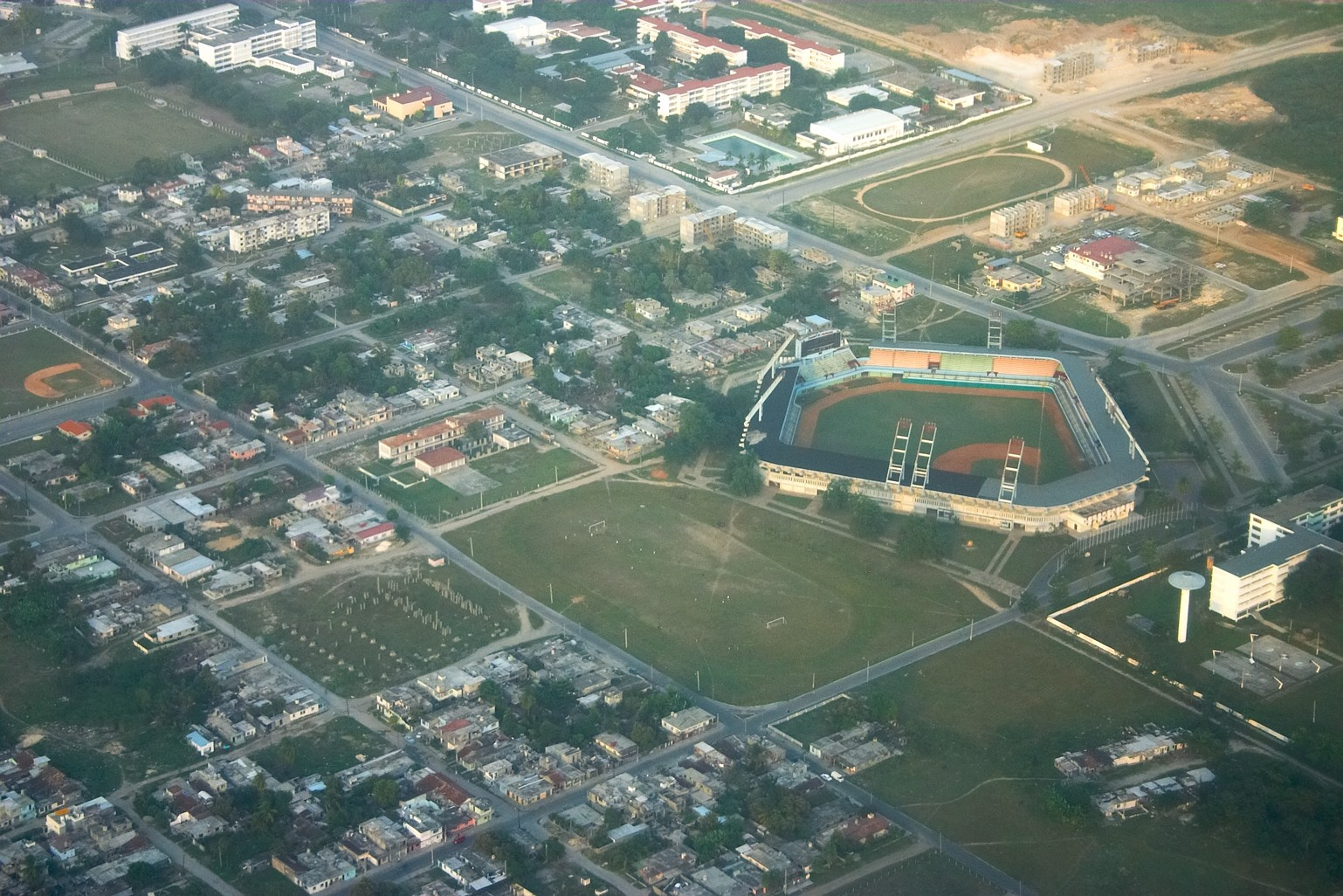
Cinco de Septiembre Stadium

Estadio 5 de Septiembre (Spanish: Fifth of September) is a multi-use stadium in Cienfuegos, Cuba. It is used mostly for baseball games and is the home stadium of Cienfuegos Camaroneros. The stadium holds 15,600 people. It opened on 9 January 1977.

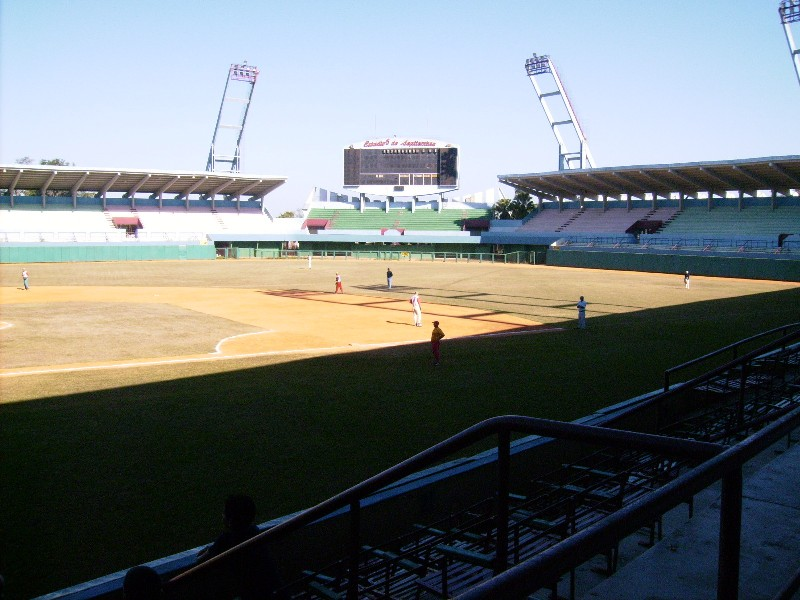
Cinco de Septiembre

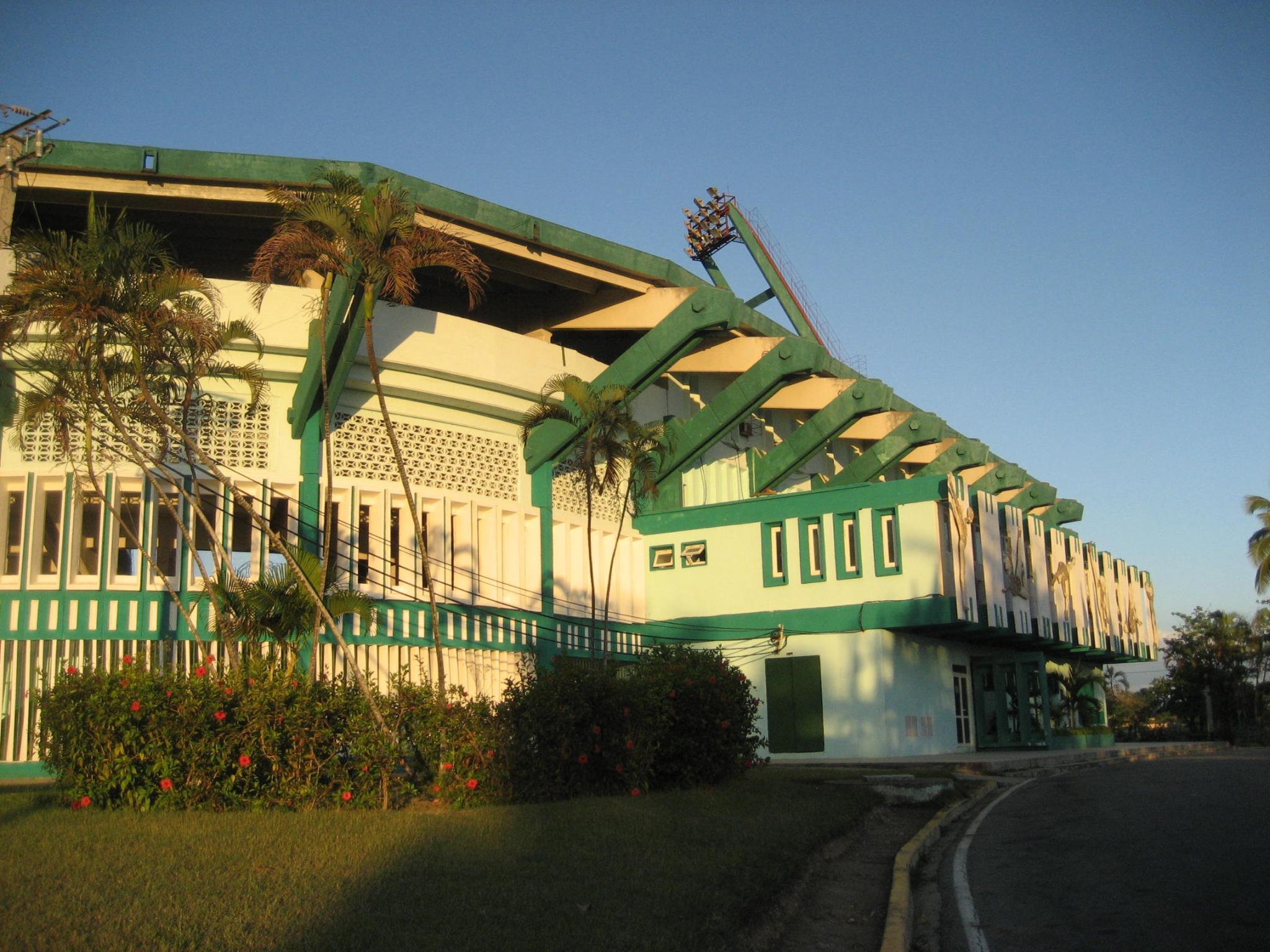
Cienfuegos Elefantes baseball stadium

== See also ==
- Lists of stadiums
