= Nguyen Van Troi Stadium =

Coordinates: 20°8′12″N 75°11′52″W

Nguyen Van Troi Stadium is a multi-use stadium in Guantánamo, Cuba. It is currently used mostly for baseball games and is the home stadium of Guantánamo Indios. The stadium holds 14,000 people.

The stadium is named after the Vietnamese communist guerrilla fighter, Nguyen Van Troi, who was executed after trying to assassinate US Secretary of State Robert S. McNamara during a visit to South Vietnam.
