= Estadio Cándido González =

Multi-use stadium in Camagüey, Cuba

Coordinates: 21°22′43″N 77°54′41″W

- Location: Camagüey, Cuba
- Owner: Government of Cuba
- Capacity: 15,000
- Surface: Grass

Construction
- Opened: 1947
- Renovated: 1977, 2007

Tenants
- Toros de Camagüey (Cuban National Series)

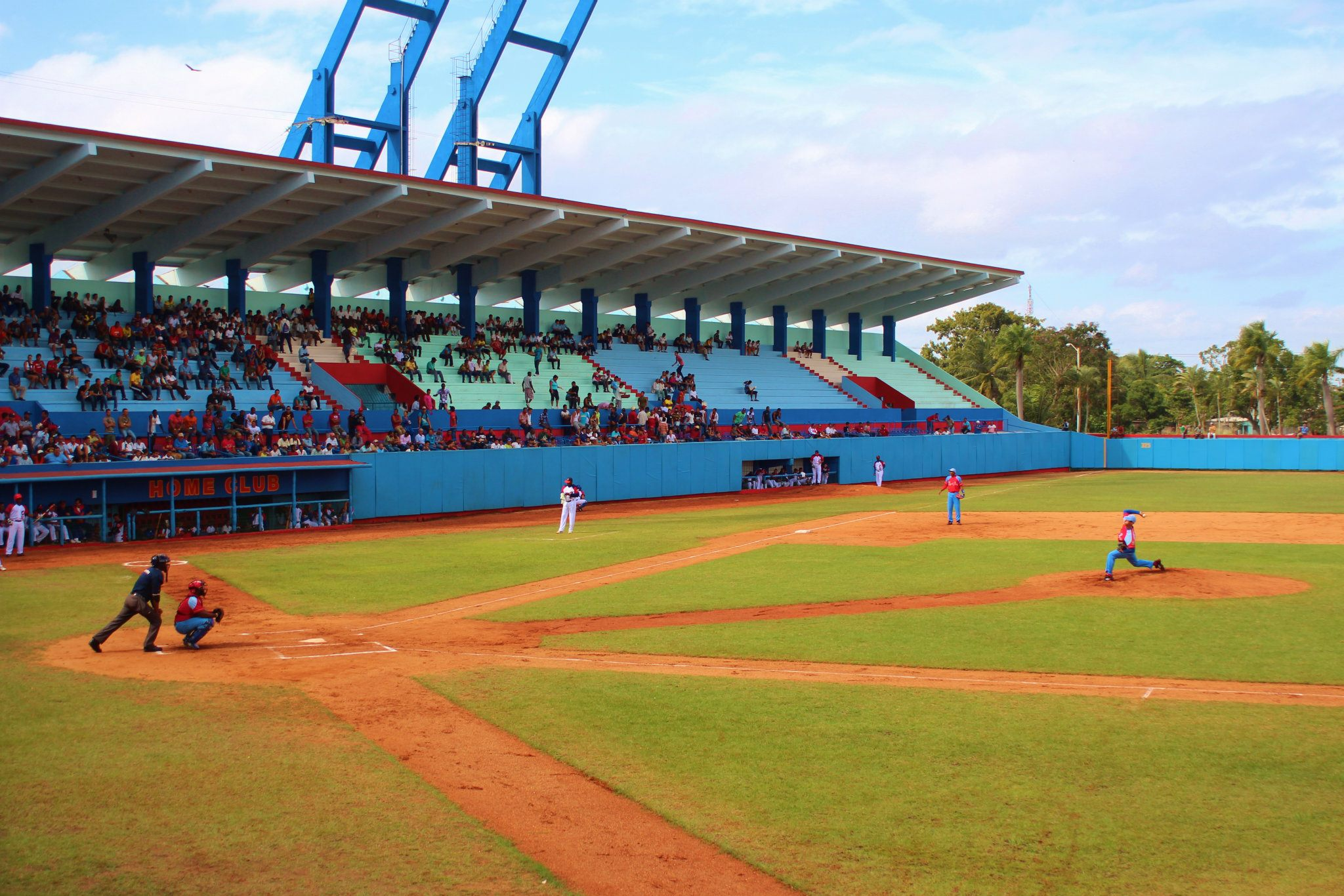
Estadio Cándido González in 2012

Estadio Cándido González
- Location: Camagüey, Cuba
- Owner: Government of Cuba
- Capacity: 15,000
- Surface: Grass
- Opened: 1967

Tenants
- Toros de Camagüey (Cuban National Series)

Estadio Cándido González is a multi-use stadium located in Camagüey, Cuba. It is primarily used for baseball and serves as the home field for the Toros de Camagüey, a team in the Cuban National Series. The stadium has a capacity of 15,000 spectators.

== History ==
The stadium was constructed in 1967 to provide a dedicated space for baseball and other sporting events in Camagüey. It was named in honor of Cándido González Morales, a notable figure in Cuban sports history and a player who made significant contributions to the development of baseball in the region.

== Structure and Features ==
Estadio Cándido González has a natural grass surface and is designed to meet the needs of high-level baseball competitions. With a seating capacity of 15,000, it is one of the larger sports venues in Cuba. The stadium is equipped for hosting night games and is a central hub for baseball activities in the city.

== Role in Cuban Baseball ==
The stadium is home to the Toros de Camagüey, one of the teams competing in the Cuban National Series. It regularly hosts games during the season and serves as a venue for other provincial and national baseball tournaments.
