= Mártires de Barbados Stadium =

Stadium in Cuba

Coordinates: 20°22′3″N 76°37′48″W

Mártires de Barbados Stadium is a multi-use stadium in Bayamo, Cuba. It is currently used mostly for baseball games and is the home stadium of Granma Alazanes. The stadium holds 10,000 people.
