= Estadio Augusto César Sandino =

Sports venue in Cuba

Augusto César Sandino
- Sandino
- Interactive map of Augusto César Sandino
- Location: Santa Clara, Cuba
- Coordinates: 22°24′15″N 79°57′18″W
- Owner: Government of Cuba
- Capacity: 18,000
- Surface: Grass
- Field size: Left: 325 feet (99 m); Center: 400 feet (122 m); Right: 325 feet (99 m)

Construction
- Opened: January 8, 1966

Estadio Augusto César Sandino is a multi-use stadium in Santa Clara, Cuba. It is currently used mostly for baseball games and is the home stadium of Villa Clara Naranjas. The stadium holds 20,000 people.

Sandino Stadium "Orange fury" | La furia naranja, el estadio sandino de Santa Clara

La Furia Naranja (Orange Fury) is the nickname of Villa Clara province baseball team, the name was also given since 2009 to everything painted in orange throughout the city.

== History and architecture ==
The architects Emilio Castro and Gustavo R. Arnavat projected the Sandino in 1963 using the technique of articulated precast molding. In an effort to take the National Sport to every corner of the country, they were looking for a design solution that was less expensive and easier to adapt to the rest of Cuban cities without baseball facilities. It has an area of 2,900 m^{2} (3,468 sq yd) and capacity for 10,000 people. It opened on January 8, 1966.

The substructure is made out of concrete cast in-situ. Prefabricated structures such as vaults and PEPSA joints that hold the ceiling tiles were made using prefabricated reinforced concrete. The lobby's floor is tiled with Cuban marble, while the rest of the structure has polished concrete floor.

The gallery of the stadium has 148 columns from 2 to 12 m (6 ft 7 in to 39 ft 4 in) high sustaining 100 beams. It has ten lighting towers 33 m (108 ft) high with 320 bulbs of 1500 Watts. The stadium's water supply is provided by gravity from an elevated tank of 10,000 gallon capacity. It also has among its facilities a dorm room with 208 beds, nursery, bathrooms, lockers, warehouses and offices.

This structure's design was first built in Santa Clara city and subsequently repeated in the cities of Camagüey, Matanzas and Pinar del Rio. Then slowly to the rest of the country's cities and towns. The Cienfuego's stadium executed on September 5, 1977 is a good example of how the Sandino architectural typology could be re-adapted and slightly modified to create a similar looking building with some variants.

The stadium's namesake is Nicaraguan revolutionary Augusto César Sandino.

== International events ==
- Baseball World Cup 1971 and 1973
- Intercontinental Cup 1979
- José Antonio Huelga Tournament (3)
- World Junior Baseball Championship in 2006

== Relevant facts ==
Artists that have performed in the stadium:

- Joan Manuel Serrad
- Dani Rivera
- Sonia Silvestre
- Lucecita Benítez

== Gallery ==
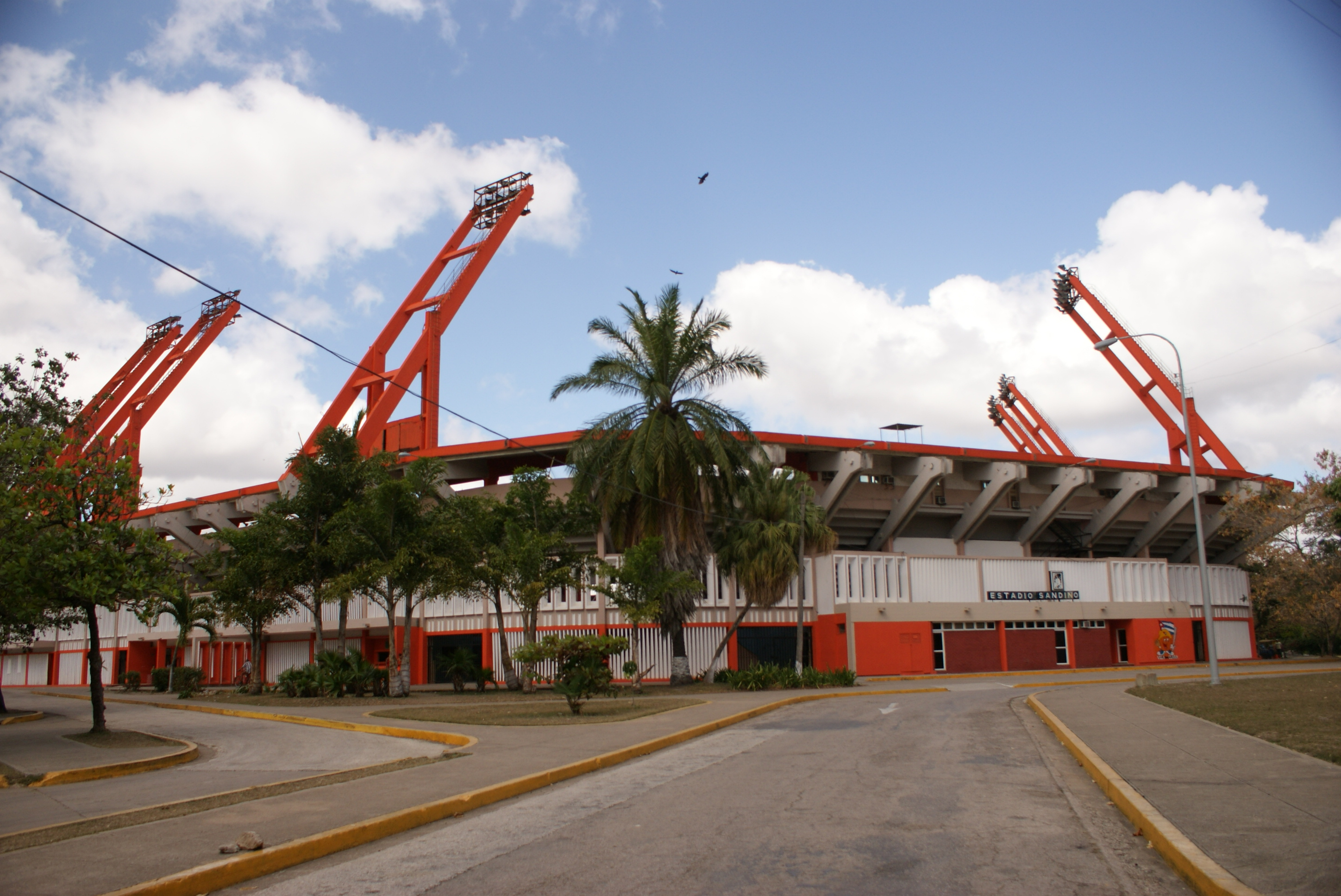
Exterior of the stadium

Sandino Stadium from a close building

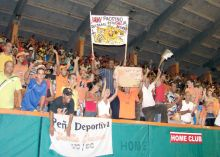
Full house in the stadium
