= Baseball at the 2015 Pan American Games – Men's team rosters =

This article shows the rosters of all participating teams at the men's baseball tournament at the 2015 Pan American Games in Toronto. Rosters can have a maximum of 24 athletes.

== Canada ==
Canada announced their squad on June 17, 2015. The position of the player is listed in parentheses.

- Andrew Albers (P)
- Phillippe Aumont (P)
- Shane Dawson (P)
- Kellin Deglan (C)
- Bryan Dykxhoorn (P)
- Jeff Francis (P)
- Tyson Gillies (OF)
- Shawn Hill (P)
- Jesse Hodges (INF)
- Sean Jamieson (INF)
- Brock Kjeldgaard (OF)
- Jordan Lennerton (INF)
- Chris Leroux (P)
- Kyle Lotzkar (P)
- Jared Mortensen (P)
- Tyler O'Neill (INF)
- Pete Orr (INF)
- Jasvir Rakkar (P)
- Scott Richmond (P)
- Chris Robinson (C)
- Evan Rutckyj (P)
- Tim Smith (OF)
- Skyler Stromsmoe (INF)
- Rene Tosoni (OF)

Legend: C = Catcher • INF = Infielder • OF = Outfielder • P = Pitcher

== Colombia ==
The following is Colombia's men's baseball team for the 2015 Pan American Games. The position of the player is listed in parentheses.

- Carlos Willoughby (U)
- Charlie Mirabal (IF/OF)
- Ronald Luna (IF/OF)
- Harold Rumion (P)
- Efrain Contreras (IF/OF)
- Sneider Batista (IF/OF)
- Diover Avila (OF)
- Jonathan Lozada (U)
- Ismael Castro (IF/OF)
- Hector Acuna (IF/OF)
- Harold Ramírez (IF/OF)
- Randy Consuegra (P)
- Yesid Salazar (P)
- Jayson De Aguas (C/IF)
- Jorge Ariza (C/IF)
- Karl Triana (P)
- Tito Polo (IF/OF)
- Dumas Garcia (P)
- Steve Brown (IF/OF)
- Ronald Ramirez (P)
- Nabil Crismatt (P)
- Juan Corpas (P)
- Javier Ortiz (P)
- Cristian Mendoza (P)

Legend: C = Catcher, INF = Infielder, OF = Outfielder, P = Pitcher, U = Utility

== Cuba ==
Cuba's men's baseball team for the 2015 Pan American Games is listed below. The position of the player is listed in parentheses.

- Roel Santos (OF)
- Raul Gonzalez (OF/IF)
- Rudy Reyes (OF/IF)
- Yosvany Alarcón (C)
- Freddy Álvarez (P)
- Urmaris Guerra (OF)
- Ismel Jiménez (P)
- Frederich Cepeda (IF)
- Yander Guevara (P)
- Jose Garcia (OF)
- Héctor Mendoza (P)
- Yorbis Borroto (IF)
- Yordan Manduley (IF)
- Frank Morejón (C)
- Erly Casanova (P)
- Alfredo Despaigne (OF)
- Alexander Malleta (IF)
- Yosbany Torres (P)
- Yoennis Yera (P)
- Yulexis La Rosa (C)
- William Saavedra (IF)
- Lazaro Blanco (P)
- Livan Moinelo (P)
- Yennier Canó (P)

Legend: C = Catcher, INF = Infielder, OF = Outfielder, P = Pitcher

== Dominican Republic ==
The Dominican Republic announced their squad on June 19, 2015. The position of the player is listed in parentheses.

- Ruben Sosa (OF)
- Yeixon Ruiz (OF)
- Jordy Lara (INF)
- Aneury Tavarez (OF)
- Ronny Rodríguez (INF)
- Pedro Feliz (INF)
- Víctor Méndez (INF)
- Mayobanex Acosta (C)
- Angelo Mora (INF)
- Claudio Vargas (P)
- Pedro de los Santos (P)
- Miguel Fermin (P)
- Jonathan Galvez (INF)
- Mario Mercedes (C)
- Leonel Santiago (P)
- Willy Lebrón (P)
- Kelvin Jiménez (P)
- Luis Liria (P)
- Pedro López ()
- Manuel Mayorson (INF)
- Adalberto Méndez (P)
- Roberto Novoa (P)
- Kelvin Pérez (P)
- Roberto Gómez (P)

Legend: C = Catcher, INF = Infielder, OF = Outfielder, P = Pitcher

== Nicaragua ==
The following is Nicaragua's men's baseball team for the 2015 Pan American Games. The position of the player is listed in parentheses.

- Dwight Britton (OF)
- Jorge Bucardo (P)
- Ofilio Castro (INF)
- Wiston Davila (C)
- Berman Espinoza (P)
- Samuel Estrada (P)
- Ramon Flores (OF)
- Elvin Garcia (P)
- Ronald Garth (INF)
- Sandor Guido (INF)
- Gerardo Juarez (P)
- Darrel Leiva (P)
- Darrel Campbell Lewis (INF)
- Ivan Marin (INF)
- Gustavo Martinez (P)
- Janior Montes (C)
- Renato Morales (OF)
- Vicente Padilla (P)
- Justo Rivas (OF)
- Arnold Rizo (OF)
- Jose Saenz (P)
- Douglas Solis (P)
- Carlos Teller (P)
- Junior Tellez (P)

Legend: C = Catcher, INF = Infielder, OF = Outfielder, P = Pitcher

== Puerto Rico ==
The following is Puerto Rico's men's baseball team for the 2015 Pan American Games. The position of the player is listed in parentheses.

- Richard Gonzalez (INF)
- Roberto Pena (C)
- Gabriel Robles (INF)
- Ramesis Rosa (P)
- Aldo Mendez (OF)
- Jeffry Dominguez (INF)
- Jose Ayala (P)
- Edgardo Baez (OF)
- Miguel Martinez (P)
- Joiset Feliciano (OF)
- Raul Rivera (P)
- Richard Thon (IF)
- Luis Cintron (P)
- Nelson Gomez (IF)
- Roy Geiger (P)
- Anthony Garcia (OF)
- Tomas Santiago (P)
- Andrés Santiago (P)
- Luis Ramos (P)
- Yomar Cruz (C)
- Luis Gonzalez (P)
- Hector Ponce (OF)
- Jose Soler (P)
- Beningno Cepeda (P)

Legend: C = Catcher, INF = Infielder, OF = Outfielder, P = Pitcher

== United States ==
The United States announced their squad on June 29, 2015. The position of the player is listed in parentheses.

- Albert Almora (OF)
- Jake Barrett (P)
- Buddy Baumann (P)
- Jeff Bianchi (IF/OF)
- Aaron Blair (P)
- Brian Bogusevic (OF)
- Casey Coleman (P)
- Zach Eflin (P)
- Brian Ellington (P)
- Cam Gallagher (C)
- Josh Hader (P)
- David Huff (P)
- Travis Jankowski (OF)
- Patrick Kivlehan (OF)
- Casey Kotchman (IF)
- Scott McGregor (P)
- Tommy Murphy (C)
- Andy Parrino (INF)
- Tyler Pastornicky (INF)
- Paul Sewald (P)
- Nate Smith (P)
- Jake Thompson (P)
- Johnathan Williamson (OF)
- Jacob Wilson (INF)

Legend: C = Catcher, INF = Infielder, OF = Outfielder, P = Pitcher
