= Baseball at the 2015 Pan American Games – Men's tournament =

Baseball – Men's tournament at the 2015 Pan American Games
- Venue: Pan Am Ball Park
- Dates: July 11 – 19
- Competitors: 168 from 7 nations

Medalists
Gold medal	Canada
Silver medal	United States
Bronze medal	Cuba

The men's baseball tournament at the 2015 Pan American Games in Toronto, Canada was held at the Pan Am Ball Park in Ajax, Ontario from July 11 to 19. Two fields hosted competition, with the main one holding 4,000 spectators and the secondary one holding 1,000 seats.

For these games, the men competed in a 7-team tournament. The teams were grouped into one single pool, and all teams played each other in a round-robin preliminary round. The top four teams advanced to the semifinals.

Canada are the defending champions from the 2011 Pan American Games in Guadalajara, defeating The United States, 2–1 in the final.

== Qualification ==
Seven men's teams qualified to compete. The host nation Canada along with the U.S. (for its contributions to the game) qualified automatically. The top four teams at the 2014 Central American and Caribbean Games also qualified. The last qualifier saw one team qualify from the 2015 South American Championships. Rosters had a maximum of 24 players.

=== Men ===
Event	Date	Location	Vacancies	Qualified
Host Nation	—	—	1	Canada
Qualified automatically	—	—	1	United States
2014 Central American and Caribbean Games	November 15–21	(Mexico) Veracruz	4	Cuba; Nicaragua; Dominican Republic; Puerto Rico
2015 South American Championships	February 28 – March 7	(Brazil) Cuiabá	1	Colombia
Total			7	

== Medalists ==
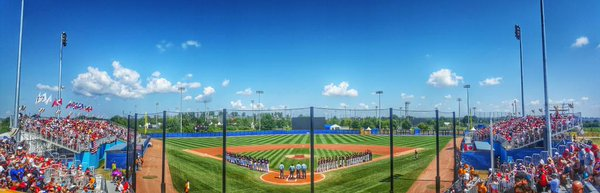
The Pan Am Ball Park in Ajax, was the venue for the baseball competitions

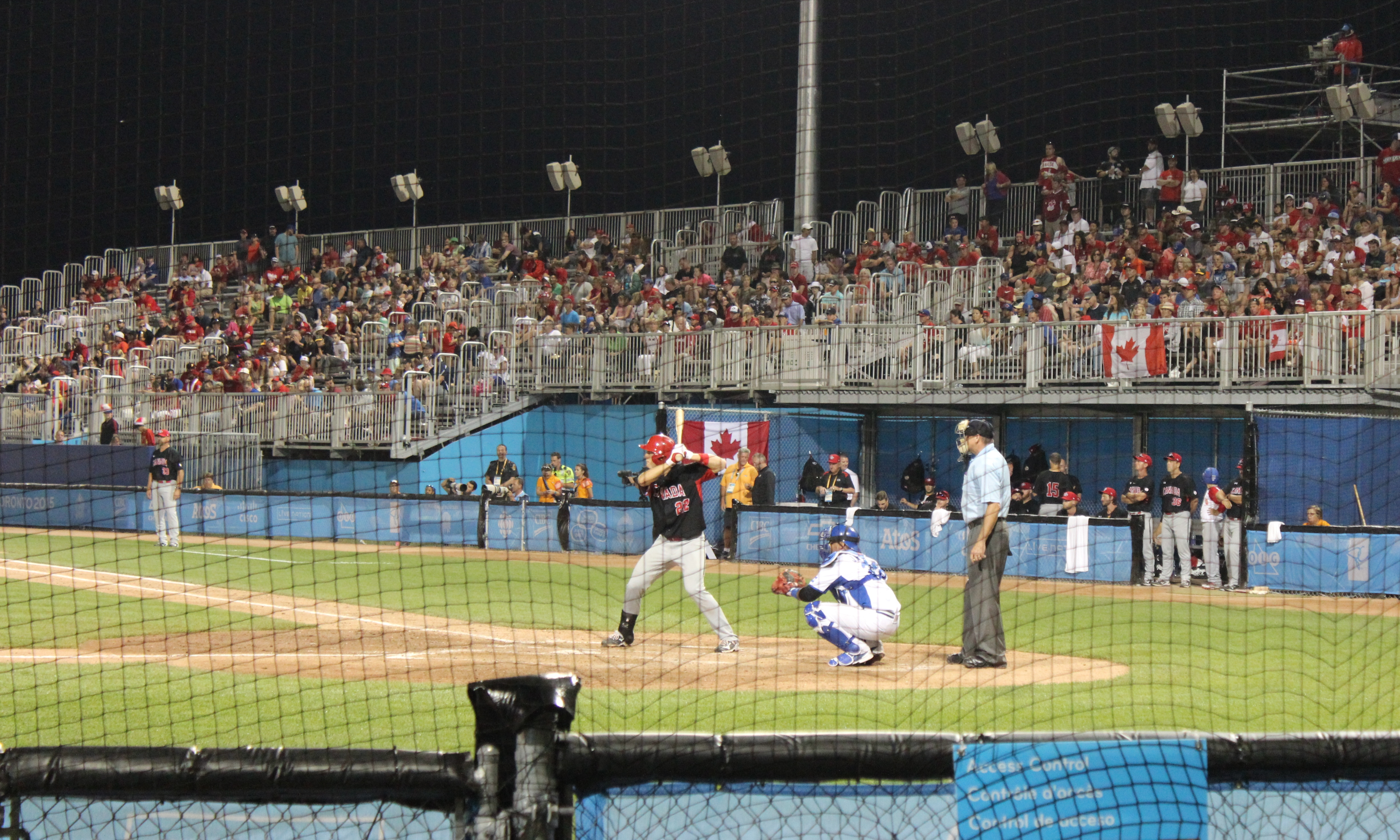
Baseball competition at the President's Choice Ajax Pan Am Ballpark

Event	Gold	Silver	Bronze
Men's tournament	Canada; Andrew Albers; Phillippe Aumont; Shane Dawson; Kellin Deglan; Brock Dykxhoorn; Jeff Francis; Tyson Gillies; Shawn Hill; Jesse Hodges; Sean Jamieson; Brock Kjeldgaard; Jordan Lennerton; Chris Leroux; Kyle Lotzkar; Jared Mortensen; Tyler O'Neill; Pete Orr; Jasvir Rakkar; Scott Richmond; Chris Robinson; Evan Rutckyj; Tim Smith; Skyler Stromsmoe; Rene Tosoni	United States; Albert Almora; Jake Barrett; Buddy Baumann; Aaron Blair; Brian Bogusevic; Dusty Coleman; Casey Coleman; Zach Eflin; Brian Ellington; Eric Fryer; Josh Hader; David Huff; Travis Jankowski; Ryan Kelly; Patrick Kivlehan; Casey Kotchman; Scott McGregor; Tom Murphy; Andy Parrino; Tyler Pastornicky; Nate Smith; Jake Thompson; Dan Vogelbach; Jacob Wilson	Cuba; Roel Santos; Raul Gonzalez; Rudy Reyes; Yosvany Alarcón; Freddy Álvarez; Urmaris Guerra; Ismel Jimenez; Frederich Cepeda; Yander Guevara; Jose Garcia; Hector Mendoza; Yorbis Borroto; Yordan Manduley; Frank Morejon; Erly Casanova; Alfredo Despaigne; Alexander Malleta; Yosbany Torres; Yoennis Yera; Yulexis La Rosa; William Saavedra; Lazaro Blanco; Livan Moinelo; Yennier Canó

== Rosters ==
At the start of tournament, all seven participating countries had up to 24 players on their rosters.

- Canada
- Colombia
- Cuba
- Dominican Republic
- Nicaragua
- Puerto Rico
- United States

== Results ==
The official detailed schedule was revealed on April 20, 2015.

All times are Eastern Daylight Time (UTC−4)

=== Preliminary round ===
Pos	Team	Pld	W	L	RF	RA	RD	PCT	GB	Qualification
1	Canada	6	5	1	38	15	+23	.833	—	Advance to the semifinals
2	United States	6	4	2	33	22	+11	.667 (Note: In the 3-way tie for 2nd place, all three teams went 1-1 head to head. The 2nd tiebreaker, Team Quality Balance, was used to identify and eliminate the last team in the group (Puerto Rico). The tie between the other two teams was then broken on the basis of the head-to-head result between them (United States defeating Cuba).)	1	Advance to the semifinals
3	Cuba	6	4	2	41	23	+18	.667	1	Advance to the semifinals
4	Puerto Rico	6	4	2	40	44	−4	.667	1	Advance to the semifinals
5	Dominican Republic	6	3	3	30	35	−5	.500	2	
6	Nicaragua	6	1	5	22	43	−21	.167	4	
7	Colombia	6	0	6	22	44	−22	.000	5	

Notes:

11 July 2015; 12:00	Colombia	3–10	Cuba	President’s Choice Ajax Pan Am Ballpark – Main Field, Ajax; Attendance: 1,600
11 July 2015; 12:00		Boxscore		President’s Choice Ajax Pan Am Ballpark – Main Field, Ajax; Attendance: 1,600

11 July 2015; 15:30	United States	9–10	Puerto Rico	President’s Choice Ajax Pan Am Ballpark – Second Field, Ajax; Attendance: 400
11 July 2015; 15:30		Boxscore		President’s Choice Ajax Pan Am Ballpark – Second Field, Ajax; Attendance: 400

11 July 2015; 19:00	Canada	4–1	Dominican Republic	President’s Choice Ajax Pan Am Ballpark – Main Field, Ajax; Attendance: 3,522
11 July 2015; 19:00		Boxscore		President’s Choice Ajax Pan Am Ballpark – Main Field, Ajax; Attendance: 3,522

12 July 2015; 12:00	Dominican Republic	8–5	Nicaragua	President’s Choice Ajax Pan Am Ballpark – Main Field, Ajax; Attendance: 3,418
12 July 2015; 12:00		Boxscore		President’s Choice Ajax Pan Am Ballpark – Main Field, Ajax; Attendance: 3,418

12 July 2015; 15:30	Canada	10–3	Colombia	President’s Choice Ajax Pan Am Ballpark – Second Field, Ajax; Attendance: 1,257
12 July 2015; 15:30		Boxscore		President’s Choice Ajax Pan Am Ballpark – Second Field, Ajax; Attendance: 1,257

12 July 2015; 19:00	United States	5–2	Cuba	President’s Choice Ajax Pan Am Ballpark – Main Field, Ajax; Attendance: 4,209
12 July 2015; 19:00		Boxscore		President’s Choice Ajax Pan Am Ballpark – Main Field, Ajax; Attendance: 4,209

13 July 2015; 12:00	Cuba	8–1	Puerto Rico	President’s Choice Ajax Pan Am Ballpark – Main Field, Ajax; Attendance: 2,133
13 July 2015; 12:00		Boxscore		President’s Choice Ajax Pan Am Ballpark – Main Field, Ajax; Attendance: 2,133

13 July 2015; 15:30	Colombia	3–5	United States	President’s Choice Ajax Pan Am Ballpark – Second Field, Ajax; Attendance: 1,400
13 July 2015; 15:30		Boxscore		President’s Choice Ajax Pan Am Ballpark – Second Field, Ajax; Attendance: 1,400

13 July 2015; 19:00	Nicaragua	1–9	Canada	President’s Choice Ajax Pan Am Ballpark – Main Field, Ajax; Attendance: 4,327
13 July 2015; 19:00		Boxscore		President’s Choice Ajax Pan Am Ballpark – Main Field, Ajax; Attendance: 4,327

14 July 2015; 12:00	Colombia	4–7	Nicaragua	President’s Choice Ajax Pan Am Ballpark – Main Field, Ajax; Attendance: 1,357
14 July 2015; 12:00		Boxscore		President’s Choice Ajax Pan Am Ballpark – Main Field, Ajax; Attendance: 1,357

14 July 2015; 15:30	Dominican Republic	6–12	Puerto Rico	President’s Choice Ajax Pan Am Ballpark – Second Field, Ajax; Attendance: 623
14 July 2015; 15:30		Boxscore		President’s Choice Ajax Pan Am Ballpark – Second Field, Ajax; Attendance: 623

14 July 2015; 19:00	Cuba	1–3	Canada	President’s Choice Ajax Pan Am Ballpark – Main Field, Ajax; Attendance: 4,638
14 July 2015; 19:00		Boxscore		President’s Choice Ajax Pan Am Ballpark – Main Field, Ajax; Attendance: 4,638

15 July 2015; 12:00	Nicaragua	0–6	United States	President’s Choice Ajax Pan Am Ballpark – Main Field, Ajax; Attendance: 1,038
15 July 2015; 12:00		Boxscore		President’s Choice Ajax Pan Am Ballpark – Main Field, Ajax; Attendance: 1,038

15 July 2015; 15:30	Puerto Rico	8–7	Colombia	President’s Choice Ajax Pan Am Ballpark – Second Field, Ajax; Attendance: 738
15 July 2015; 15:30		Boxscore		President’s Choice Ajax Pan Am Ballpark – Second Field, Ajax; Attendance: 738

15 July 2015; 19:00	Cuba	9–5	Dominican Republic	President’s Choice Ajax Pan Am Ballpark – Main Field, Ajax; Attendance: 4,127
15 July 2015; 19:00		Boxscore		President’s Choice Ajax Pan Am Ballpark – Main Field, Ajax; Attendance: 4,127

16 July 2015; 12:00	United States	4–6	Dominican Republic	President’s Choice Ajax Pan Am Ballpark – Main Field, Ajax; Attendance: 1,453
16 July 2015; 12:00		Boxscore		President’s Choice Ajax Pan Am Ballpark – Main Field, Ajax; Attendance: 1,453

16 July 2015; 15:30	Nicaragua	6–11	Cuba	President’s Choice Ajax Pan Am Ballpark – Second Field, Ajax; Attendance: 1,027
16 July 2015; 15:30		Boxscore		President’s Choice Ajax Pan Am Ballpark – Second Field, Ajax; Attendance: 1,027

16 July 2015; 19:00	Puerto Rico	4–11	Canada	President’s Choice Ajax Pan Am Ballpark – Main Field, Ajax; Attendance: 4,727
16 July 2015; 19:00		Boxscore		President’s Choice Ajax Pan Am Ballpark – Main Field, Ajax; Attendance: 4,727

17 July 2015; 12:00	Puerto Rico	5–3	Nicaragua	President’s Choice Ajax Pan Am Ballpark – Main Field, Ajax; Attendance: 724
17 July 2015; 12:00		Boxscore		President’s Choice Ajax Pan Am Ballpark – Main Field, Ajax; Attendance: 724

17 July 2015; 15:30	Dominican Republic	4–1	Colombia	President’s Choice Ajax Pan Am Ballpark – Second Field, Ajax; Attendance: 573
17 July 2015; 15:30		Boxscore		President’s Choice Ajax Pan Am Ballpark – Second Field, Ajax; Attendance: 573

17 July 2015; 19:00	Canada	1–4	United States	President’s Choice Ajax Pan Am Ballpark – Main Field, Ajax; Attendance: 4,761
17 July 2015; 19:00		Boxscore		President’s Choice Ajax Pan Am Ballpark – Main Field, Ajax; Attendance: 4,761

=== Medal round ===
Semifinals
July 18 — Ajax
Canada	7
Puerto Rico	1
July 18 — Ajax
United States	6
Cuba	5

Gold medal
July 19 — Ajax
Canada	7
United States	6
Bronze medal
July 19 — Ajax
Puerto Rico	6
Cuba	7

==== Semifinals ====
18 July 2015; 13:00	United States	6–5	Cuba	President’s Choice Ajax Pan Am Ballpark – Main Field, Ajax; Attendance: 4,702
18 July 2015; 13:00		Boxscore		President’s Choice Ajax Pan Am Ballpark – Main Field, Ajax; Attendance: 4,702

18 July 2015; 19:00	Canada	7–1	Puerto Rico	President’s Choice Ajax Pan Am Ballpark – Main Field, Ajax; Attendance: 4,827
18 July 2015; 19:00		Boxscore		President’s Choice Ajax Pan Am Ballpark – Main Field, Ajax; Attendance: 4,827

==== Bronze medal match ====
19 July 2015; 13:00	(bronze) Cuba	7–6	Puerto Rico	President’s Choice Ajax Pan Am Ballpark – Main Field, Ajax; Attendance: 4,914
19 July 2015; 13:00		Boxscore		President’s Choice Ajax Pan Am Ballpark – Main Field, Ajax; Attendance: 4,914

==== Gold medal match ====
19 July 2015; 19:00	(gold) Canada	7–6 (10)	United States (silver)	President’s Choice Ajax Pan Am Ballpark – Main Field, Ajax; Attendance: 5,489
19 July 2015; 19:00		Boxscore		President’s Choice Ajax Pan Am Ballpark – Main Field, Ajax; Attendance: 5,489

2015 Pan American Games winners

Canada
2nd title

== Final standings ==
Rank	Team	Record
Gold medal	Canada	7–1
Silver medal	United States	5–3
Bronze medal	Cuba	5–3
4	Puerto Rico	4–4
5	Dominican Republic	3–3
6	Nicaragua	1–5
7	Colombia	0–6
