= Softball at the 2015 Pan American Games – Men's tournament =

Softball – Men's tournament at the 2015 Pan American Games
- Venue: Pan Am Ball Park
- Dates: July 12 – 18
- Competitors: 90 from 6 nations

Medalists
Gold medal	Canada
Silver medal	Venezuela
Bronze medal	Argentina

The men's softball tournament at the 2015 Pan American Games in Toronto, Canada, was held at the Pan Am Ball Park in Ajax, Ontario from July 12 to 18.

Men's softball returned to the Pan American Games sports program after last being competed in 2003.

For these Games, the men competed in a 6-team tournament. The teams were grouped into one single pool and all teams played each other in a round-robin preliminary round. The top four teams would advance to the semifinals.

== Qualification ==
A total of six men's team qualified to compete at the games. Canada as host nation qualified automatically, along with the top five nations at the qualification event held in October 2014. Each team can contain a maximum of fifteen athletes.

=== Summary ===
Event	Date	Location	Vacancies	Qualified
Host Nation	—N/a	—N/a	1	Canada
2014 Pan American Championship	October 25 – November 1	(Argentina) Paraná	5	Venezuela; Argentina; United States; Dominican Republic; Mexico
TOTAL			6	

== Rosters ==
At the start of tournament, all six participating countries had up to 15 players on their rosters.

- Argentina
- Canada
- Dominican Republic
- Mexico
- United States
- Venezuela

Event	Gold	Silver	Bronze
Men's tournament	Canada; Ryan Boland; Sean Cleary; Jeff Ellsworth; Brad Ezekiel; Ian Fehrman; Jason Hill; Brandon Horn; Paul Koert; Derek Mayson; Steve Mullaley; Mathieu Roy; Jason Sanford; Kevin Schellenberg; Andy Skelton; Ryan Wolfe	Venezuela; Arturo Acacio; Yeider Chirinos; Joan Colombo; Rafael Flores; Pedro Gonzalez; Ramon Jones; Jorge Lima; Edwin Linares; Tulio Linares; Iran Paez; Luiger Pinto; Kerlis Rivero; Rogelio Sequera; Erick Urbaneja; John Zambrano	Argentina; Mauricio Caceres; Santiago Carril; Sebastian Gervasutti; Gustavo Godoy; Manuel Godoy; Roman Godoy; Juan Malarczuk; Huemul Mata; Teo Migliavacca; Mariano Montero; Pablo Montero; Bruno Motroni; Fernando Petric; Juan Potolicchio; Juan Zara

== Competition format ==
In the first round of the competition, teams were divided into one pool of six teams, and play followed round robin format with each of the teams playing all other teams in the pool once.

Following the completion of the pool games, the top four teams advanced to a page playoff round consisting of two semifinal games, and the final and grand final. All games were played over seven innings.

== Results ==
The official detailed schedule was revealed on May 1, 2015.

All times are Eastern Daylight Time (UTC−4)

=== Preliminary round ===
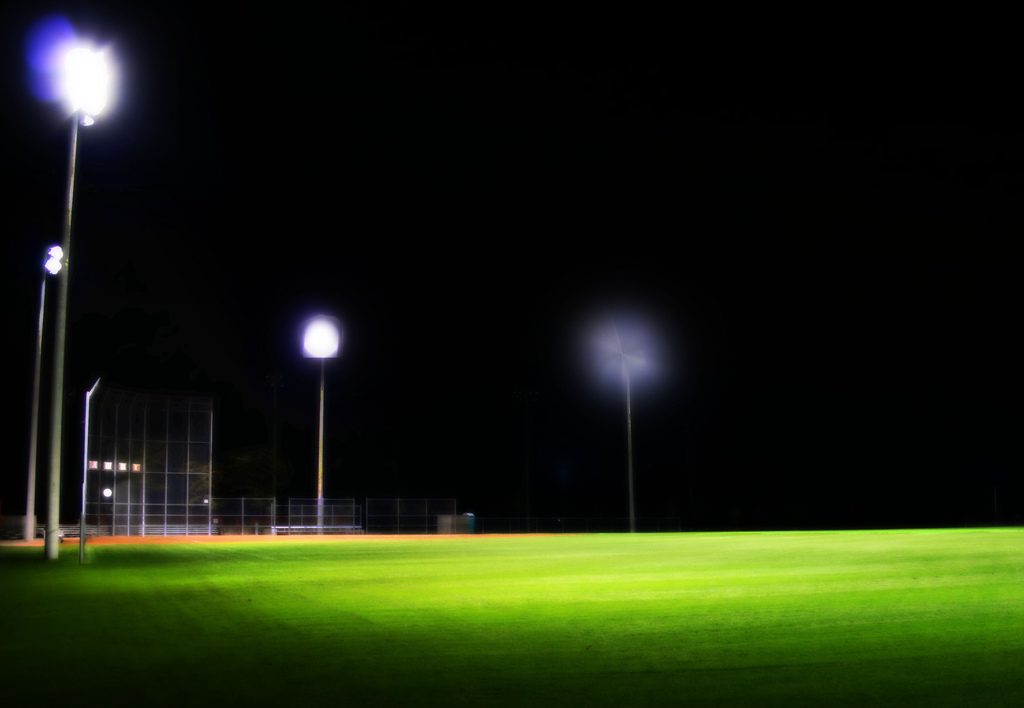
The Pan Am Ball Park in Ajax, the venue for the men's softball competition

Team	Pld	W	L	RF	RA	RD	Qualification
Canada	5	5	0	33	13	+20	Qualified for the semifinals
Argentina	5	3	2	19	15	+4	Qualified for the semifinals
Venezuela	5	3	2	14	10	+4	Qualified for the semifinals
United States	5	2	3	16	10	+6	Qualified for the semifinals
Mexico	5	2	3	16	22	−6	
Dominican Republic	5	0	5	5	33	−28	

Home team in each game is listed first.

12 July 2015; 10:00	Dominican Republic	0–10	United States	President’s Choice Ajax Pan Am Ballpark, Ajax; Attendance: 1,010
12 July 2015; 10:00		Boxscore		President’s Choice Ajax Pan Am Ballpark, Ajax; Attendance: 1,010

12 July 2015; 16:30	Argentina	3–0	Venezuela	President’s Choice Ajax Pan Am Ballpark, Ajax; Attendance: 200
12 July 2015; 16:30		Boxscore		President’s Choice Ajax Pan Am Ballpark, Ajax; Attendance: 200

12 July 2015; 19:00	Canada	10–5	Mexico	President’s Choice Ajax Pan Am Ballpark, Ajax; Attendance: 1,243
12 July 2015; 19:00		Boxscore		President’s Choice Ajax Pan Am Ballpark, Ajax; Attendance: 1,243

13 July 2015; 14:00	Mexico	5–3	Argentina	President’s Choice Ajax Pan Am Ballpark, Ajax; Attendance: 220
13 July 2015; 14:00		Boxscore		President’s Choice Ajax Pan Am Ballpark, Ajax; Attendance: 220

13 July 2015; 16:30	Venezuela	5–1	Dominican Republic	President’s Choice Ajax Pan Am Ballpark, Ajax; Attendance: 129
13 July 2015; 16:30		Boxscore		President’s Choice Ajax Pan Am Ballpark, Ajax; Attendance: 129

13 July 2015; 19:00	United States	2–3	Canada	President’s Choice Ajax Pan Am Ballpark, Ajax; Attendance: 2,230
13 July 2015; 19:00		Boxscore		President’s Choice Ajax Pan Am Ballpark, Ajax; Attendance: 2,230

14 July 2015; 14:00	United States	1–3	Venezuela	President’s Choice Ajax Pan Am Ballpark, Ajax; Attendance: 132
14 July 2015; 14:00		Boxscore		President’s Choice Ajax Pan Am Ballpark, Ajax; Attendance: 132

14 July 2015; 16:30	Dominican Republic	2–4	Mexico	President’s Choice Ajax Pan Am Ballpark, Ajax; Attendance: 363
14 July 2015; 16:30		Boxscore		President’s Choice Ajax Pan Am Ballpark, Ajax; Attendance: 363

14 July 2015; 19:00	Argentina	3–9	Canada	President’s Choice Ajax Pan Am Ballpark, Ajax; Attendance: 2,890
14 July 2015; 19:00		Boxscore		President’s Choice Ajax Pan Am Ballpark, Ajax; Attendance: 2,890

15 July 2015; 14:00	Venezuela	5–1	Mexico	President’s Choice Ajax Pan Am Ballpark, Ajax; Attendance: 215
15 July 2015; 14:00		Boxscore		President’s Choice Ajax Pan Am Ballpark, Ajax; Attendance: 215

15 July 2015; 16:30	Argentina	3–1	United States	President’s Choice Ajax Pan Am Ballpark, Ajax; Attendance: 301
15 July 2015; 16:30		Boxscore		President’s Choice Ajax Pan Am Ballpark, Ajax; Attendance: 301

15 July 2015; 19:00	Canada	7–2	Dominican Republic	President’s Choice Ajax Pan Am Ballpark, Ajax; Attendance: 632
15 July 2015; 19:00		Boxscore		President’s Choice Ajax Pan Am Ballpark, Ajax; Attendance: 632

16 July 2015; 14:00	Dominican Republic	0–7	Argentina	President’s Choice Ajax Pan Am Ballpark, Ajax; Attendance: 340
16 July 2015; 14:00		Boxscore		President’s Choice Ajax Pan Am Ballpark, Ajax; Attendance: 340

16 July 2015; 16:30	Canada	4–1	Venezuela	President’s Choice Ajax Pan Am Ballpark, Ajax; Attendance: 2,010
16 July 2015; 16:30		Boxscore		President’s Choice Ajax Pan Am Ballpark, Ajax; Attendance: 2,010

16 July 2015; 19:00	Mexico	1–2	United States	President’s Choice Ajax Pan Am Ballpark, Ajax; Attendance: 89
16 July 2015; 19:00		Boxscore		President’s Choice Ajax Pan Am Ballpark, Ajax; Attendance: 89

=== Medal round ===
Semifinals
1	Canada	2
2	Argentina	0
3	Venezuela	1
4	United States	0

Final
2	Argentina	0
3	Venezuela	2

Grand Final
1	Canada	2
3	Venezuela	1

==== Semifinals ====
17 July 2015; 16:30	Venezuela	1–0	United States	President’s Choice Ajax Pan Am Ballpark, Ajax; Attendance: 521
17 July 2015; 16:30		Boxscore		President’s Choice Ajax Pan Am Ballpark, Ajax; Attendance: 521

17 July 2015; 19:00	Canada	2–0	Argentina	President’s Choice Ajax Pan Am Ballpark, Ajax; Attendance: 1,030
17 July 2015; 19:00		Boxscore		President’s Choice Ajax Pan Am Ballpark, Ajax; Attendance: 1,030

==== Final ====
18 July 2015; 12:00	(bronze) Argentina	0–2	Venezuela	President’s Choice Ajax Pan Am Ballpark, Ajax; Attendance: 2,999
18 July 2015; 12:00		Boxscore		President’s Choice Ajax Pan Am Ballpark, Ajax; Attendance: 2,999

==== Grand Final ====
18 July 2015; 15:00	(gold) Canada	2–1	Venezuela (silver)	President’s Choice Ajax Pan Am Ballpark, Ajax; Attendance: 3,030
18 July 2015; 15:00		Boxscore		President’s Choice Ajax Pan Am Ballpark, Ajax; Attendance: 3,030

2015 Pan American Games winners

Canada
8th title

== Final standings ==
Rank	Team	Record
Gold medal	Canada	7 – 0
Silver medal	Venezuela	5 – 3
Bronze medal	Argentina	3 – 4
4	United States	2 – 4
5	Mexico	2 – 3
6	Dominican Republic	0 – 5
