= James Jones (baseball) =

American baseball player (born 1988)

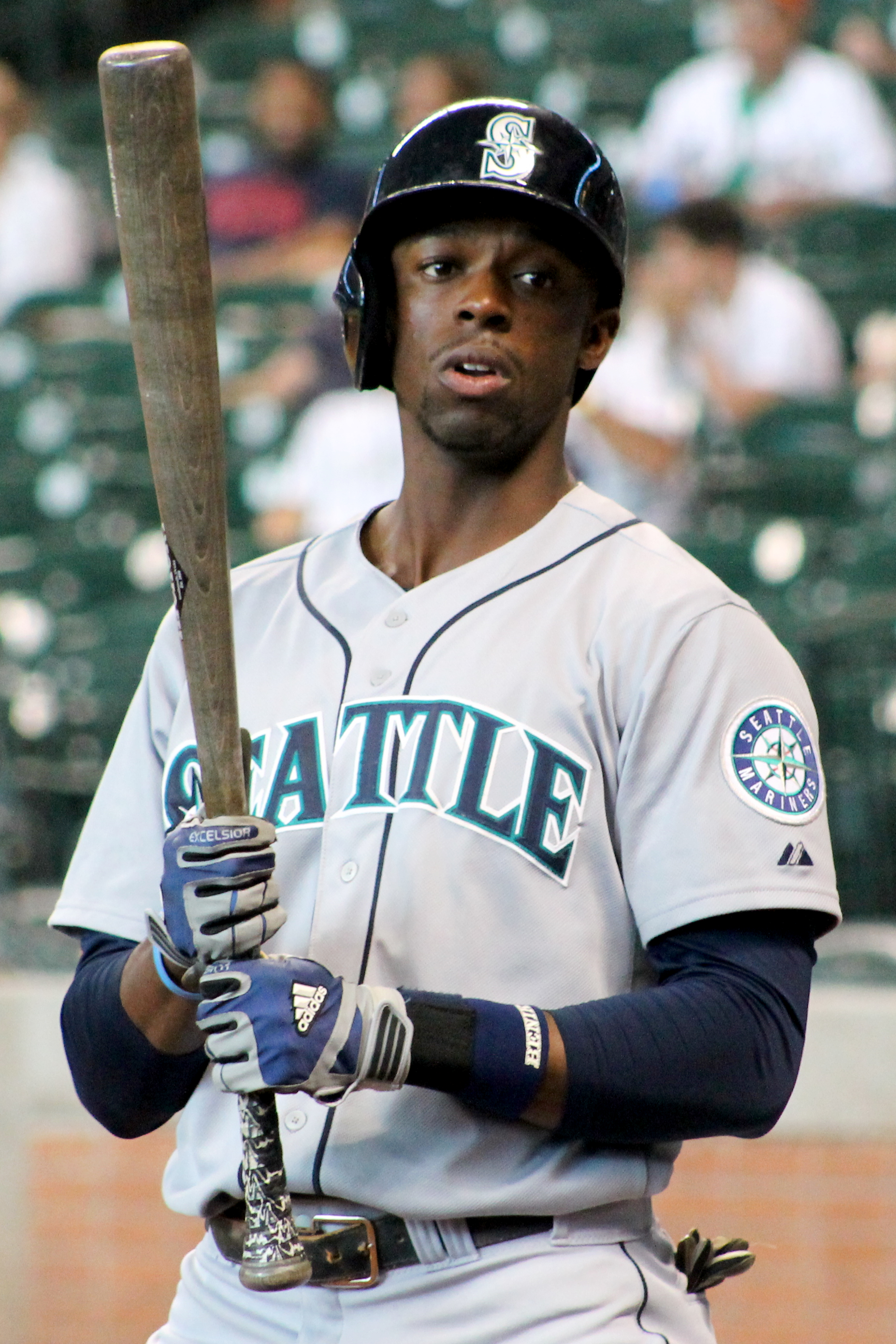
- Jones with the Seattle Mariners in 2014
- Outfielder / Pitcher
- Born: September 24, 1988 (age 38); Brooklyn, New York, U.S.
- Batted: Left Threw: Left

MLB debut
- April 18, 2014, for the Seattle Mariners

Last MLB appearance
- October 4, 2015, for the Seattle Mariners

MLB statistics
- Batting average: .238
- Home runs: 0
- Runs batted in: 9
- Stolen bases: 28
- Stats at Baseball Reference

Teams
- Seattle Mariners (2014–2015)

James Steven Jones (born September 24, 1988) is an American former professional baseball outfielder and pitcher. He was drafted by the Seattle Mariners in the fourth round of the 2009 Major League Baseball draft and made his Major League Baseball (MLB) debut with them in 2014.

== Early life ==
Jones attended the High School of Telecommunications in Bay Ridge, Brooklyn, where he led them to a Brooklyn West Division Championship. He spent time as both a pitcher and a position player.

In 2007, Jones began attending Long Island University where in his freshman season he played 50 games, including pitching in 12 of those games. For the season he hit .299 with 10 doubles, three triples, four home runs and 32 RBIs. He also had eight stolen bases. He was primarily used as a pitcher and went 2−6 with a 7.25 ERA in 12 games, eight starts.

He started all 67 games in 2008, including 14 pitching appearances. Jones hit .309 with eight doubles, two triples, five home runs and 28 RBIs. His 41 runs and 19 stolen bases were team highs. He earned many honors including First Team All-Northeast Conference, he was named NEC Player of the Week on March 24, he was ranked 30th on Baseball America's Top 100 College Prospects List and was named top prospect in New York State by Perfect Game Crosschecker.

Going into his junior year many felt Jones was better suited as a pitcher entering the draft. His fastball was said to be up to 95 mph (153 km/h). Jones continued to play as a pitcher and an outfielder throughout the rest of his junior season. He was drafted by the Mariners at the end of the season as an outfielder rather than a pitcher.

== Professional career ==
=== Seattle Mariners ===
Jones began his professional career in 2009 with the Low-A Everett AquaSox of the Northwest League. He played 33 games in right field, seven at first base, three at designated hitter and one in left field. Jones finished the season hitting .311 with 12 doubles, two triples, three home runs and 24 RBIs. In 2010, Baseball America listed Jones as the "Best Outfield Arm" in the Seattle Mariners organization. To begin the 2010 season, Jones was assigned to the Single-A Clinton LumberKings. On the season, Jones batted .269 with 87 runs scored, 132 hits, 24 doubles, 10 triples, 12 home runs, 64 RBIs, and 24 stolen bases.

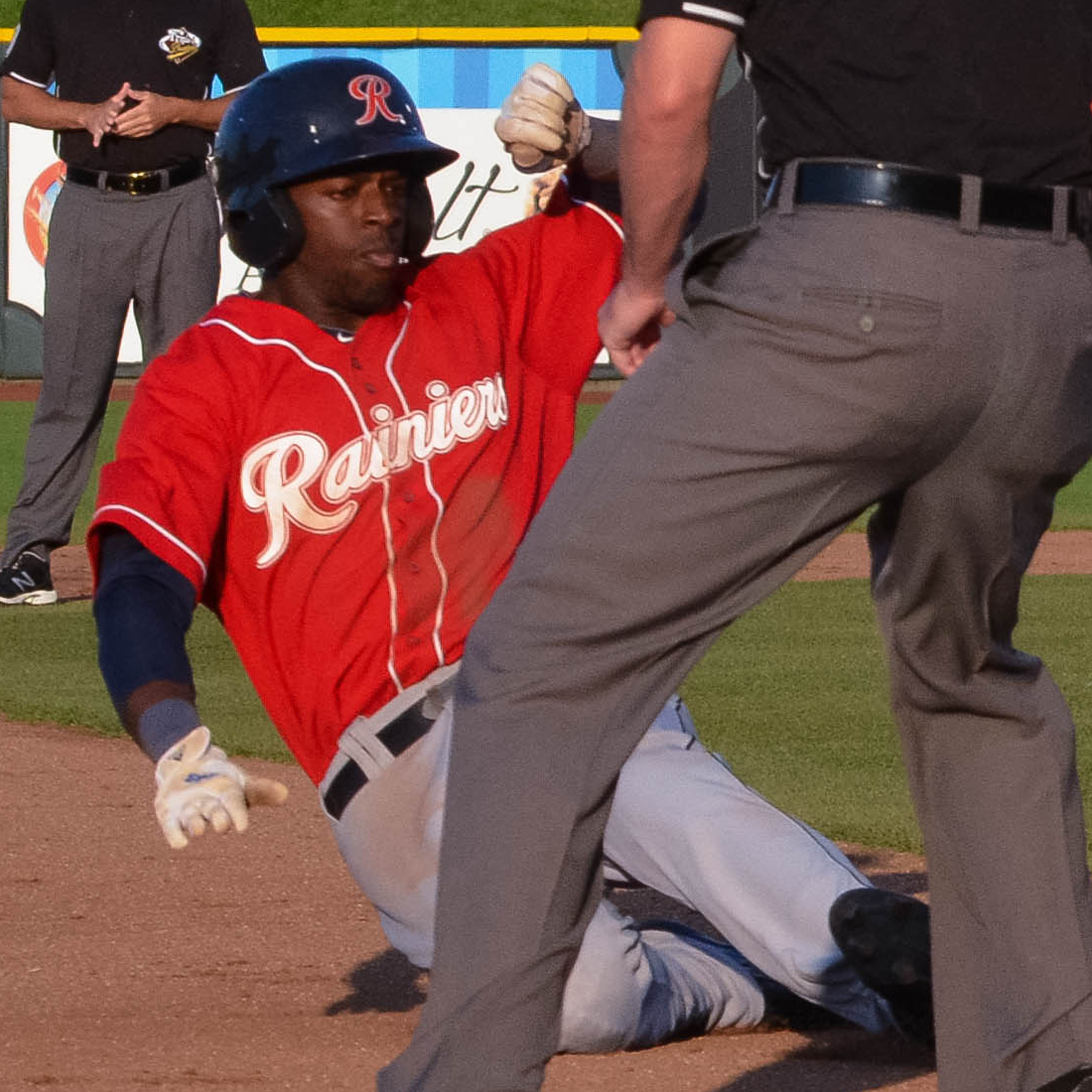
Jones playing for the Tacoma Rainiers in 2015

The Mariners added Jones to their 40-man roster on November 20, 2013. He was called up to the Mariners on April 16, 2014 and had his MLB debut on April 18, 2014 against the Miami Marlins. In his first at bat he beat out a ground ball to the second baseman for his first MLB hit. Following the game he was optioned back to Triple-A Tacoma. On May 5, 2014 he was recalled to the Mariners.

On May 18, 2014, Jones joined Edgar Martínez as the only players in Mariners history to hit safely in each of their first ten MLB starts. He registered a hit in each of his first 13 MLB starts.

=== Texas Rangers ===
On November 16, 2015, the Mariners traded Jones, Tom Wilhelmsen, and a player to be named later (Patrick Kivlehan) to the Texas Rangers in exchange for Leonys Martín and Anthony Bass. The Rangers did not tender him a contract for 2016, so he became a free agent on December 2. He was re-signed to a minor league contract on December 10.

Jones began the 2016 season with the Triple-A Round Rock Express, before transitioning into a pitcher. In August, Jones made his first appearance as a pitcher for the Arizona League Rangers. Jones missed the entire 2017 season after undergoing Tommy John surgery in 2016. In 2018, he played for the rookie-level Arizona League Rangers, High-A Down East Wood Ducks, Double-A Frisco RoughRiders, and Round Rock, accumulating a 1–1 record with a 7.34 ERA over 30 2/3 innings. Jones elected free agency on November 2, 2018.

Jones re-signed with the Rangers on a minor league contract on February 14, 2019. Jones split the 2019 season between Frisco and the Triple-A Nashville Sounds, going a combined 3–2 with a 3.52 ERA with 71 strikeouts over 64 innings. Jones was the Texas Rangers 2019 Minor League True Ranger Award winner. He elected free agency following the season on November 4. Jones re-signed with the Rangers on another minor league contract on January 9, 2020. He did not play in a game in 2020 due to the cancellation of the minor league season because of the COVID-19 pandemic.

Jones split the 2022 campaign between Round Rock, Frisco, and the rookie-level Arizona Complex League Rangers. In 22 appearances split between the three affiliates, he compiled a 4-0 record and 3.86 ERA with 36 strikeouts across 21 innings pitched. Jones elected free agency following the season on November 10, 2022.

=== Los Angeles Dodgers ===
On December 15, 2022, Jones signed a minor league contract with the Los Angeles Dodgers. He pitched in five games with the Arizona Complex League Dodgers and 15 for the Oklahoma City Dodgers, accumulating a 2–2 record and 3.67 ERA over 27 innings. Jones elected free agency following the season on November 6, 2023.
