= Anthony Bass =

American baseball player (born 1987)

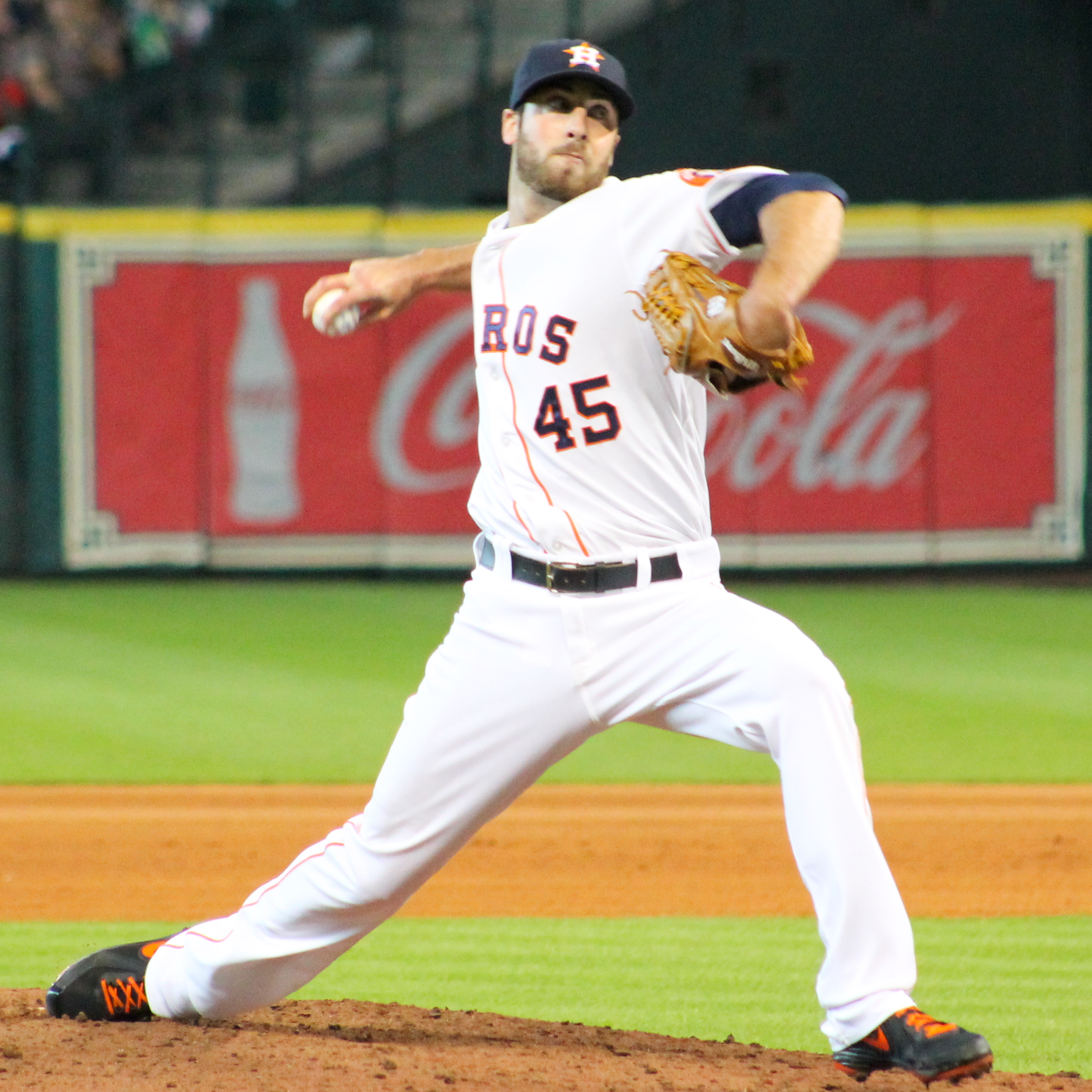
- Bass with the Houston Astros in 2014
- Pitcher
- Born: November 1, 1987 (age 39); Dearborn, Michigan, U.S.
- Batted: Right Threw: Right

Professional debut
- MLB: June 13, 2011, for the San Diego Padres
- NPB: March 30, 2016, for the Hokkaido Nippon-Ham Fighters

Last appearance
- NPB: October 8, 2016, for the Hokkaido Nippon-Ham Fighters
- MLB: June 5, 2023, for the Toronto Blue Jays

MLB statistics
- Win–loss record: 16–28
- Earned run average: 3.91
- Strikeouts: 416

NPB statistics
- Win–loss record: 8–8
- Earned run average: 3.65
- Strikeouts: 71
- Stats at Baseball Reference

Teams
- San Diego Padres (2011–2013); Houston Astros (2014); Texas Rangers (2015); Hokkaido Nippon-Ham Fighters (2016); Texas Rangers (2017); Chicago Cubs (2018); Seattle Mariners (2019); Toronto Blue Jays (2020); Miami Marlins (2021–2022); Toronto Blue Jays (2022–2023)

Career highlights and awards
- Japan Series champion (2016)

Anthony Edward Bass (born November 1, 1987) is an American former professional baseball pitcher. He has previously played in Major League Baseball (MLB) for the San Diego Padres, Houston Astros, Texas Rangers, Chicago Cubs, Seattle Mariners, Miami Marlins, and Toronto Blue Jays. Bass has also played for the Hokkaido Nippon-Ham Fighters of Nippon Professional Baseball (NPB). He played college baseball at Wayne State University.

== Amateur career ==
Bass attended Trenton High School in Trenton, Michigan, and Wayne State University, where he played college baseball for the Wayne State Warriors. As a junior at Wayne State, Bass was named the 2008 Great Lakes Intercollegiate Athletic Conference Pitcher of the Year. He was the highest MLB draft pick in Wayne State history.

== Professional career ==
=== San Diego Padres ===
The San Diego Padres selected Bass in the fifth round of the 2008 Major League Baseball draft. He worked as a starting pitcher for the Single-A Fort Wayne TinCaps and Advanced-A Lake Elsinore Storm in 2009, and again for Lake Elsinore in 2010. He began 2011 with the Double-A San Antonio Missions, and although he made a single start for the Triple-A Tucson Padres in May, he was promoted to the big leagues from Double-A in June.

Bass made his major league debut on June 13, 2011, pitching a five-inning start and earning his first major league win. He struck out Seth Smith for his first Major League strikeout. He was optioned back to San Antonio the next day, but was recalled again in late June. Bass stayed with the big league club for the remainder of the year, pitching out of the bullpen until making two more starts in late September. He finished 2011 with a 1.68 ERA in 48 1/3 innings and 24 strike-outs versus 21 walks.

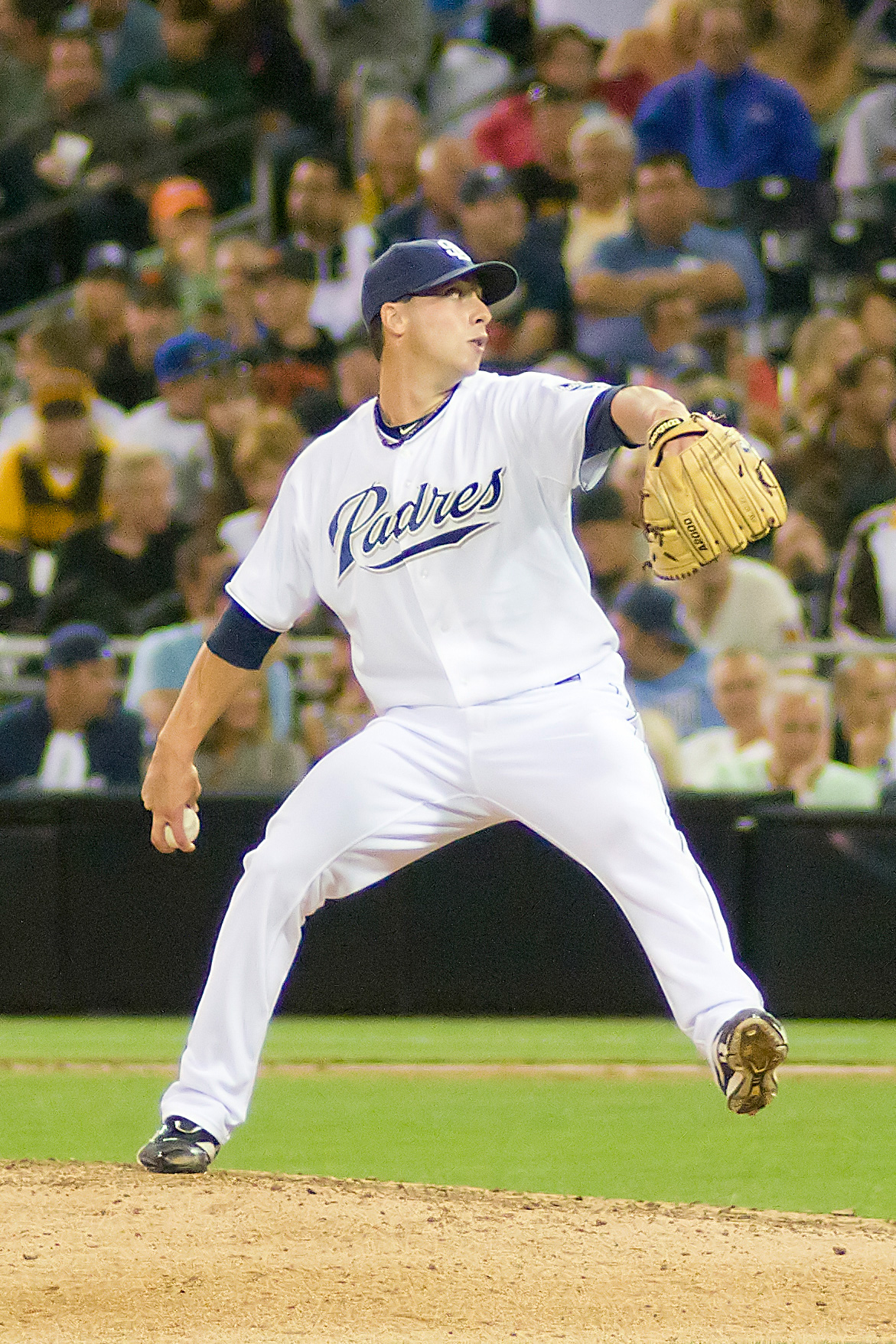
Bass with the Padres (2011)

Bass started 2012 in the Padres bullpen, but was added to the starting rotation on April 12 when Dustin Moseley injured his shoulder. Bass made 14 starts for the club until he went on the disabled list in June with shoulder inflammation. He rejoined the club in September, working out of the bullpen after making three rehab starts with Tucson. Bass finished 2012 with a 2–8 record and a 4.73 ERA in 97 innings, with 80 strike-outs against 39 walks.

=== Houston Astros ===
On December 11, 2013, Bass, along with a player to be named later or cash considerations, was traded to the Houston Astros for a player to be named later or cash considerations. The Astros sent Patrick Schuster to the Padres the next day. Bass spent the 2014 season split between the Astros and the team's Class AAA affiliate, the Oklahoma City RedHawks. He appeared in 21 major league games and earned two saves. He was outrighted off the Astros roster on November 20, 2014. On December 6, Bass elected free agency.

=== Texas Rangers ===
Bass signed a minor league contract with the Texas Rangers on December 11, 2014. Bass split time between the Triple–A Round Rock Express and the Majors, used mainly as a reliever. In 33 games for the Rangers, he compiled a 4.50 ERA in 64 innings.

=== Hokkaido Nippon-Ham Fighters ===
After the 2015 season, the Rangers traded Bass and Leonys Martín to the Seattle Mariners for Tom Wilhelmsen, James Jones, and a player to be named later (Patrick Kivlehan). Bass was released by the Mariners on January 7, 2016, and signed with the Hokkaido Nippon-Ham Fighters on January 8.

On March 30, 2016, Bass made his NPB debut. Bass earned three wins during the 2016 Japan Series to lead the Fighters to victory in the championship series, including the fourth win for the team to clinch the team's fifth championship.

=== Second stint with Rangers ===
Bass signed a minor league deal with the Texas Rangers in February 2017.

=== Chicago Cubs ===
On December 20, 2017, Bass signed a minor league contract with the Chicago Cubs. Bass was called up to the majors by the Cubs on June 11, 2018, after compiling a 2.28 ERA across 23.2 innings with the Triple-A Iowa Cubs. Bass immediately saw action as he pitched the final inning of a 7-2 11 inning victory over the Milwaukee Brewers. He was outrighted to AAA on August 12, 2018, and elected free agency on October 11.

=== Cincinnati Reds ===
On December 30, 2018, Bass signed a minor league contract with the Cincinnati Reds. He was released on March 25, 2019. Bass re-signed to another minor league contract on March 28, 2019. He opened the 2019 season with the Louisville Bats. On May 21, he was released by the Reds after exercising an opt-out clause in his contract.

=== Seattle Mariners ===
On May 21, 2019, Bass signed a major league contract with the Seattle Mariners.

=== Toronto Blue Jays ===
On October 29, 2019, the Toronto Blue Jays claimed Bass off waivers from the Mariners. He signed a one-year contract worth $1.5 million with the team on December 3, 2019, in order to avoid arbitration.

On July 24, 2020, Bass made his Blue Jays debut. With the 2020 Toronto Blue Jays, Bass appeared in 26 games, compiling a 2–3 record with 3.51 ERA and 21 strikeouts in 25.2 innings pitched.

=== Miami Marlins ===
On January 22, 2021, Bass signed a 2-year, $5MM deal with the Miami Marlins that included a team option in 2023. In April 2021, Bass was the pitcher during an extremely rare walk-off hit by pitch to lose a game against the New York Mets. With the bases loaded and the score tied in the bottom of the ninth inning, batter Michael Conforto's elbow was grazed by Bass's pitch, albeit on a clear strike where camera footage seemed to show Conforto recklessly extending his elbow into the pitch. The HBP call was controversial, with umpire Ron Kulpa saying after the game he felt his own call was in error after reviewing the footage, and Conforto should have been charged with a strike due to an insufficient attempt to avoid Bass's pitch.

=== Toronto Blue Jays (second stint) ===
On August 2, 2022, Bass was traded back to the Toronto Blue Jays alongside Brampton native Zach Pop and a player to be named later (later named Edward Duran on August 31) in exchange for prospect Jordan Groshans. In 28 games out of the bullpen down the stretch, he pitched to a 1.75 ERA with 28 strikeouts in 25 2/3 innings of work. On November 8, the Blue Jays exercised a $3 million option on Bass for the 2023 season.

Bass made 22 appearances for Toronto in 2023, posting a 4.95 ERA with 19 strikeouts in 20.0 innings pitched. On June 9, 2023, he was designated for assignment following Mitch White's activation from the injured list. He was released by the Blue Jays on June 15.

== Social media controversies ==
On April 17, 2023, Bass sparked debate and criticism after he made a post on Twitter where he claimed that a United Airlines flight attendant made his pregnant wife clean up a midair mess left by their toddler daughter, with many pointing out that it was his responsibility.

On May 29, 2023, Bass again created controversy after he shared a video on instagram describing the selling of Pride-themed merchandise as “evil” and “demonic”, in which he endorsed boycotts of Bud Light, Target and potentially other corporations, calling on Christians to support it. He subsequently apologized to the media prior to the next home game, stating that he "made a post that was hurtful to the Pride community, which includes friends of mine, and close family members of mine, and I’m truly sorry for that."

Jays general manager Ross Atkins later confirmed to People that "the relief pitcher's stance had become a "distraction" in the clubhouse", causing his release from the club. It came days after Atkins said "the pitcher would not be disciplined, claiming Bass had been apologetic and “accountable” for his actions."

== Personal life ==
On August 1, 2016, Bass married Sydney Rae James, sister of country singer Jessie James and sister in-law of Eric Decker in a private ceremony. Their first daughter was born prematurely on September 4, 2017. They adopted another daughter in October 2020. They welcomed a son in July 2023. Their second was born in October 2025.

Bass has a brother and two sisters. His parents are Ed and Linda Bass.
