= Norge Ruiz =

Cuban baseball player (born 1994)

Free agent
- Pitcher
- Born: March 15, 1994 (age 32); Camagüey, Cuba
- Bats: Right Throws: Right

MLB debut
- August 19, 2022, for the Oakland Athletics

MLB statistics (through 2022 season)
- Win–loss record: 0–1
- Earned run average: 7.11
- Strikeouts: 18
- Stats at Baseball Reference

Teams
- Oakland Athletics (2022)
Medals
Men's baseball
Representing Cuba
Central American and Caribbean Games
Gold medal – first place	2014 Veracruz	Team

Norge Luis Ruiz Loyola (born March 15, 1994) is a Cuban professional baseball pitcher who is a free agent. He has previously played in Major League Baseball (MLB) for the Oakland Athletics.

== Career ==
Ruiz was selected to play for the Cuba national baseball team at the 2014 Central American and Caribbean Games. Ruiz played in the Cuban National Series for Camagüey. He won the Cuban National Series Rookie of the Year Award for 2012/2013. In May 2015, Ruiz left Cuba to pursue a contract with a Major League Baseball (MLB) organization. Ruiz won with his national team, the gold medal of the 2014 Central American and Caribbean Games in Veracruz, Mexico.

=== Oakland Athletics ===
Ruiz signed a minor league contract with the Oakland Athletics on December 23, 2016, that included a $2 million signing bonus.

Ruiz made his professional debut in 2017 with the Dominican Summer League Athletics and was promoted to the Arizona League Athletics and Stockton Ports throughout the season. In 13 games started between the three teams he compiled a 5–2 record, 4.37 ERA, and a 1.32 WHIP. Ruiz split the 2018 season between the Double–A Midland RockHounds and Triple–A Nashville Sounds, accumulating a 6–10 record and 4.89 ERA with 86 strikeouts across 134 1/3 innings pitched. Ruiz spent 2019 split between Midland and the Triple–A Las Vegas Aviators, pitching in 38 contests and struggling to a 2–5 record and 6.49 ERA with 54 strikeouts across 69 1/3 innings of work.

He did not play in a game in 2020 due to the cancellation of the minor league season because of the COVID-19 pandemic. Ruiz returned to action in 2021, but pitched in only eight games split between Midland, the High–A Lansing Lugnuts, and the rookie–level Arizona Complex League Athletics. He began the 2022 season with Triple–A Las Vegas, making 31 relief appearances and posting a 3.73 ERA with 39 strikeouts and 2 saves.

On August 19, 2022, Ruiz was selected to the 40-man roster and promoted to the major leagues for the first time. He made 14 relief appearances for Oakland in his rookie campaign, logging a 7.11 ERA with 18 strikeouts across 19 innings. On November 3, Ruiz was removed from the 40–man roster and sent outright to Triple–A Las Vegas. Ruiz spent the entirety of 2023 with Las Vegas, making 38 appearances and struggling to a 6.95 ERA with 32 strikeouts across 45 1/3 innings pitched. He elected free agency following the season on November 6, 2023.

=== Cleburne Railroaders ===
On March 4, 2024, Ruiz signed with the Conspiradores de Querétaro of the Mexican League. On April 10, 2024, Ruiz was released by the Conspiradores.

On April 23, 2024, Ruiz signed with the Cleburne Railroaders of the American Association of Professional Baseball. On May 7, Ruiz was released by the Railroaders without appearing in a game.

=== Sultanes de Monterrey ===
On February 17, 2025, Ruiz signed with the Sultanes de Monterrey of the Mexican League. He was released prior to the start of the season.

=== Guerreros de Oaxaca ===
On February 4, 2026, Ruiz signed with the Guerreros de Oaxaca of the Mexican League.
