= Tom Murphy (catcher) =

American baseball player (born 1991)

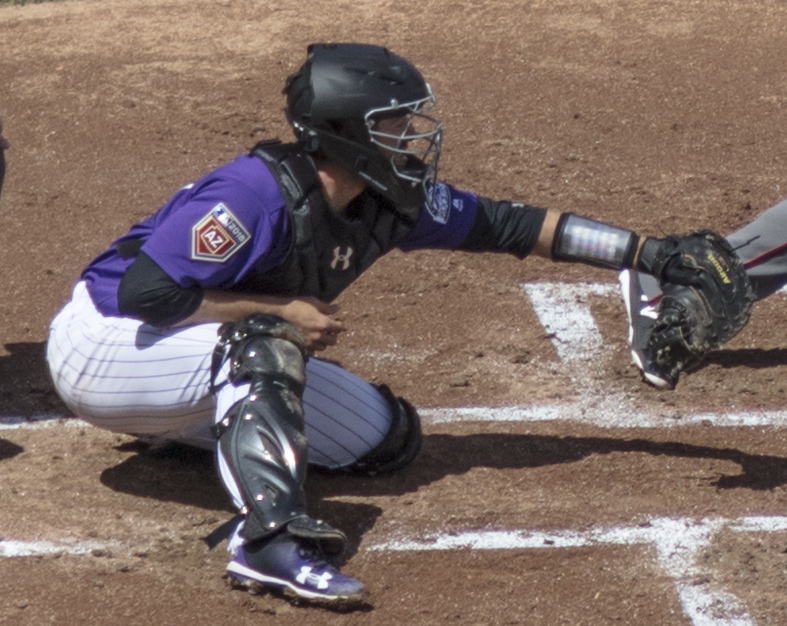
- Murphy with the Colorado Rockies in 2018

Free agent
- Catcher
- Born: April 3, 1991 (age 35); West Monroe, New York, U.S.
- Bats: Right Throws: Right

MLB debut
- September 12, 2015, for the Colorado Rockies

MLB statistics (through 2024 season)
- Batting average: .239
- Home runs: 49
- Runs batted in: 128
- Stats at Baseball Reference

Teams
- Colorado Rockies (2015–2018); Seattle Mariners (2019, 2021–2023); San Francisco Giants (2024)
Medals
Men's baseball
Representing United States
Pan American Games
Silver medal – second place	2015 Toronto	Team

Thomas James Murphy Jr. (born April 3, 1991) is an American professional baseball catcher who is a free agent. He previously played in Major League Baseball (MLB) for the Colorado Rockies, Seattle Mariners, and San Francisco Giants. Prior to playing professionally, Murphy played college baseball for the University at Buffalo.

== Amateur career ==
Murphy attended Paul V. Moore High School in Central Square, New York. He had a .510 batting average in his senior year for the school's baseball team and was honored as All-Central New York (CNY) and the CNY Athlete of the Year. In high school, Murphy was recruited to play college baseball at Buffalo, St. John’s, Michigan, Wagner, Le Moyne, and Monmouth.

Murphy ultimately committed to play for the University at Buffalo. In the summer of 2010, he played summer baseball with the Oneonta Outlaws of the New York Collegiate Baseball League. In 2011, he was named the Mid-American Conference Baseball Player of the Year after leading the conference with a .384 batting average. That summer, he played for the Holyoke Blue Sox of the New England Collegiate Baseball League (NECBL) and hit a home run off of Kevin Gausman over the Green Monster at Fenway Park against the United States collegiate national team in the NECBL All-Star Game.

== Professional career ==
=== Colorado Rockies ===
The Colorado Rockies selected Murphy in the third round, with the 105th overall selection of the 2012 MLB draft. That summer, he played for the Tri-City Dust Devils of the Low-A Northwest League.

In 2013, Murphy played for the Asheville Tourists of the Single-A South Atlantic League (SAL), where he was named SAL Hitter of the Week for the week of April 29 through May 5. He received a mid-year promotion to the Tulsa Drillers of the Double-A Texas League. In 2014, Murphy returned to Tulsa, but was limited to 27 games as a result of a shoulder injury.

Murphy began the 2015 season with the Rockies' new Double-A affiliate, the New Britain Rock Cats of the Eastern League. He was chosen to play for the United States national team in the 2015 Pan American Games. Following the Pan American Games, the Rockies promoted Murphy to the Albuquerque Isotopes of the Triple-A Pacific Coast League. Murphy was mentored in the minors by catcher Nick Hundley.

The Rockies promoted Murphy to the major leagues on September 11, 2015. he made his MLB debut on September 12 against the Seattle Mariners at Safeco Field. Murphy hit his first MLB home run on September 19 at Coors Field off San Diego Padres pitcher Marcos Mateo. Prior to the 2016 season, Baseball America ranked him the 97th best prospect in baseball. He missed substantial time during the 2016 season due to an oblique injury suffered at the end of spring training. He suffered a broken arm in spring training in 2017. He returned to the majors in mid-June. He batted 1-for-24 for the Rockies in 12 games, benched or in the minors in favor of other catchers, including the newly acquired Jonathan Lucroy. Murphy started 2018 in the Triple-A and was promoted to the Rockies on June 12. He hit a pinch-hit, go-ahead home run to beat the Arizona Diamondbacks on July 21, He was one of three catchers on the roster, sharing time with Chris Iannetta and Tony Wolters. However, he was sent down to Triple-A on August 8, as the Rockies dropped to two catchers. He returned in September, working mostly as a pinch hitter. In his rookie season, he hit .226 with two home runs and 11 RBI, but struck out in 44 of his 96 plate appearances. In spring training in 2019, the Rockies again settled on Iannetta and Wolters at catcher, waiving Murphy on March 23.

=== Seattle Mariners ===
The San Francisco Giants claimed Murphy off waivers on March 25, 2019. Three days later, he was designated for assignment after failing to make the Opening Day roster. The next day, the Giants traded Murphy to the Seattle Mariners for reliever Jesus Ozoria. Murphy excelled with Seattle, as he set career highs offensively including hitting 18 home runs and driving in 40 RBI in 75 games. Murphy missed the entire 2020 season, staying on the injured list with a fractured metatarsal in his left foot.

In 2021, Murphy appeared in a career-high 97 games, hitting .202/.304/.350 with 11 home runs and 34 RBI. The following season, he made 14 appearances for the Mariners, hitting .303/.439/.455 with one home run and one RBI. On June 23, 2022, it was announced that Murphy would require season-ending surgery to repair a shoulder injury.

On January 13, 2023, Murphy agreed to a one-year, $1.625 million contract with the Mariners, avoiding salary arbitration. After serving as the starting catcher in 2019 and 2021 and being injured in his other two years with the Mariners, he entered his final season in Seattle as the clear backup to Cal Raleigh. His season ended after injuring his thumb while catching a foul tip. The initial diagnosis of a displaced tendon was changed to a fracture. In 47 games, he batted. 290 with 8 home runs.

=== San Francisco Giants ===
On December 23, 2023, Murphy signed a two-year, $8.25 million contract with the San Francisco Giants. He hit .118 in 13 games for the Giants before suffering a knee injury while chasing down a wild pitch on May 4, 2024. He was diagnosed with a left knee sprain and ruled out for 4-to-6 weeks, which necessitated a move to the 60-day injured list on May 15. He would not play any more games on his contract with the Giants.

On March 27, 2025, Murphy returned to on the 60-day injured list with a herniated disc in his back. He missed the entire 2025 season and rehabilitated at home in New York. He said in August that his injury had been mishandled and that he had received an epidural in the wrong disc in his back, hampering his recovery. The Giants declined the 2026 option on Murphy's contract on November 3, paying him a $250,000 buyout and making him a free agent.

== International career ==
Murphy played for the U.S. collegiate national team for four games in 2011, going hitless as a designated hitter and pinch hitter in 8 at bats. He also played against the national team, homering off Kevin Gausman in Fenway Park in a win for the New England Collegiate Baseball League All-Stars.

Murphy played for the U.S. national team at the 2015 Pan Am Games, a team consisting largely of Minor League Baseball players. Pitcher Nate Smith praised Murphy's catching as the U.S. limited Cuba to one hit in a semifinal win. In the championship game, Murphy could not hold onto a throw from Tyler Pastornicky during a play at the plate, allowing Canada's Pete Orr to score the title-winning run. Murphy started 10 games for the U.S., batting .324 with two doubles, two triples, and one defensive error.

== Personal life ==
Murphy was raised by his parents in West Monroe, New York. The family are fans of the New York Yankees. He has a brother.

Murphy and his wife have three children and reside in Constantia, New York.

Murphy has blue eyes, which San Francisco pitcher Mason Black said "definitely stare into your soul". He is also known as an intense baseball player.
