= Baseball at the 2014 Central American and Caribbean Games =

2014 international baseball tournament

- Venue: Estadio Universitario Beto Ávila
- Location: Veracruz
- Dates: 15 – 21 November 2014

The baseball competition at the 2014 Central American and Caribbean Games was held at the Estadio Universitario Beto Ávila in Veracruz, Mexico from 15 to 21 November 2014. This tournament was a qualifier for the baseball tournament at the 2015 Pan-American Games in Toronto, Canada. The top four teams each earned a berth in that tournament.

== Medal summary ==
Event	Gold	Silver	Bronze
Men's tournament	Cuba; Roel Santos; Daynel Moreira; Luis Yander La O Yulieski Gurriel; Yosvani Alarcon; Freddy Alvarez; Lourdes Gurriel Jr. Yadiel Hernandez; Frederich Cepeda; Jonder Martinez; Norge Ruiz; Hector Mendoza; Yordan Manduley; Frank Morejon; Julio Martinez; Cionel Perez; Alfredo Despaigne; Alexander Malleta; Yosbany Torres; Yoanni Yera; Yulexis La Rosa; Yaisel Sierra; Alexei Bell; Vladimir Gutierrez	Nicaragua; Salvador Marin; Miguel Morales; Erly Britton; Jose Guido; Ballardo Garth; Antonio Castro; Jose Tellez; Eugene Campbell; Ramon Flores; Arnoldo Calderon; Luanny Sanchez; Geovanie Montes; Cesar Rivas; Carlos Teller; Adolfo Martinez; Luis Saenz; Teofilo Polanco; Ariel Solis; Aristides Sevilla; J. C. Ramirez; Antonio Orozco; Antonio Bucardo; Berman Espinoza; Jorge Bucardo	Dominican Republic; Justino Cuevas; Danny Taveras; Henry Mateo; Felix Carrasco; Pedro Feliz; Juan Francisco Crousset; Leyson Septimo; Omar Luna; Rafael Fernandez; Edison Alvarez; Willy Aybar; Jose Antonio Pineda; Juan Carlos de Leon; Francisco Hernandez; Adrian Rosario; Victor Mercedes; Victor Mendez; Wilson Eusebio; Rafael Garcia; Yonathan Ortega; Edward Concepcion; Jairo Heredia; Angel Gonzalez; Wilgeny Perez

=== Schedule and results ===
15 November 2014	Puerto Rico	0 – 4	Cuba	Beto Ávila Stadium, Veracruz

15 November 2014	Nicaragua	10 – 1	Dominican Republic	Beto Ávila Stadium, Veracruz

15 November 2014	Mexico	6 – 1	Guatemala	Beto Ávila Stadium, Veracruz

16 November 2014	Venezuela	2 – 0	Nicaragua	Beto Ávila Stadium, Veracruz

16 November 2014	Guatemala	3 – 14	Puerto Rico	Beto Ávila Stadium, Veracruz

16 November 2014	Dominican Republic	8 – 2	Panama	Beto Ávila Stadium, Veracruz

17 November 2014	Nicaragua	7 – 5	Panama	Beto Ávila Stadium, Veracruz

17 November 2014	Venezuela	2 – 12	Dominican Republic	Beto Ávila Stadium, Veracruz

17 November 2014	Cuba	10 – 1	Mexico	Beto Ávila Stadium, Veracruz

18 November 2014	Panama	3 – 4	Venezuela	Beto Ávila Stadium, Veracruz

18 November 2014	Guatemala	0 – 10	Cuba	Beto Ávila Stadium, Veracruz

18 November 2014	Puerto Rico	6 – 4	Mexico	Beto Ávila Stadium, Veracruz

=== Semifinals 5th-8th ===
19 November 2014	Panama	1 – 3	Mexico	Beto Ávila Stadium, Veracruz

19 November 2014	Guatemala	2 – 4	Venezuela	Beto Ávila Stadium, Veracruz

20 November 2014	Panama	5 – 0	Guatemala	Beto Ávila Stadium, Veracruz

21 November 2014	Mexico	6 – 4	Venezuela	Beto Ávila Stadium, Veracruz

=== Final Round ===
20 November 2014	Dominican Republic	3 – 6	Cuba	Beto Ávila Stadium, Veracruz

20 November 2014	Puerto Rico	1 – 2	Nicaragua	Beto Ávila Stadium, Veracruz

21 November 2014	Dominican Republic	8 – 1	Puerto Rico	Beto Ávila Stadium, Veracruz

21 November 2014	Nicaragua	3 – 9	Cuba	Beto Ávila Stadium, Veracruz

== Medal table ==
Rank	Nation	Gold	Silver	Bronze	Total
1	Cuba (CUB)	1	0	0	1
2	Nicaragua (NCA)	0	1	0	1
3	Dominican Republic (DOM)	0	0	1	1
Totals (3 entries)		1	1	1	3

== Final standings ==
Rk	Team
1st place, gold medalist(s)	Cuba
2nd place, silver medalist(s)	Nicaragua
3rd place, bronze medalist(s)	Dominican Republic
4	Puerto Rico
5	Mexico
6	Venezuela
7	Panama
8	Guatemala

== Statistical leaders ==
=== Batting ===
Statistic	Player	Total
Batting average	(Cuba) Alfredo Despaigne	.471
Batting average	(Cuba) Daynel Moreira	.471
Runs	(Cuba) Yulieski Gurriel	6
Runs	(Cuba) Pedro Félix	6
Runs	(Cuba) Yander de la O	6
Runs batted in	(Cuba) Yadiel Hernández	9
Home runs	(Guatemala) Manuel Hernández	3
Stolen bases	(Cuba) Yander de la O	6
Stolen bases	(Puerto Rico) Aldo Méndez	6
Stolen bases	(Nicaragua) Eugene Campbell	6

=== Pitching ===
Statistic	Name	Total
Earned runs allowed	8 tied with	0.00
Strikeouts	(Cuba) Norge Ruiz	13

== See also ==
- Baseball at the 2015 Pan American Games
