= Leonys Martín =

Cuban-American baseball player (born 1988)

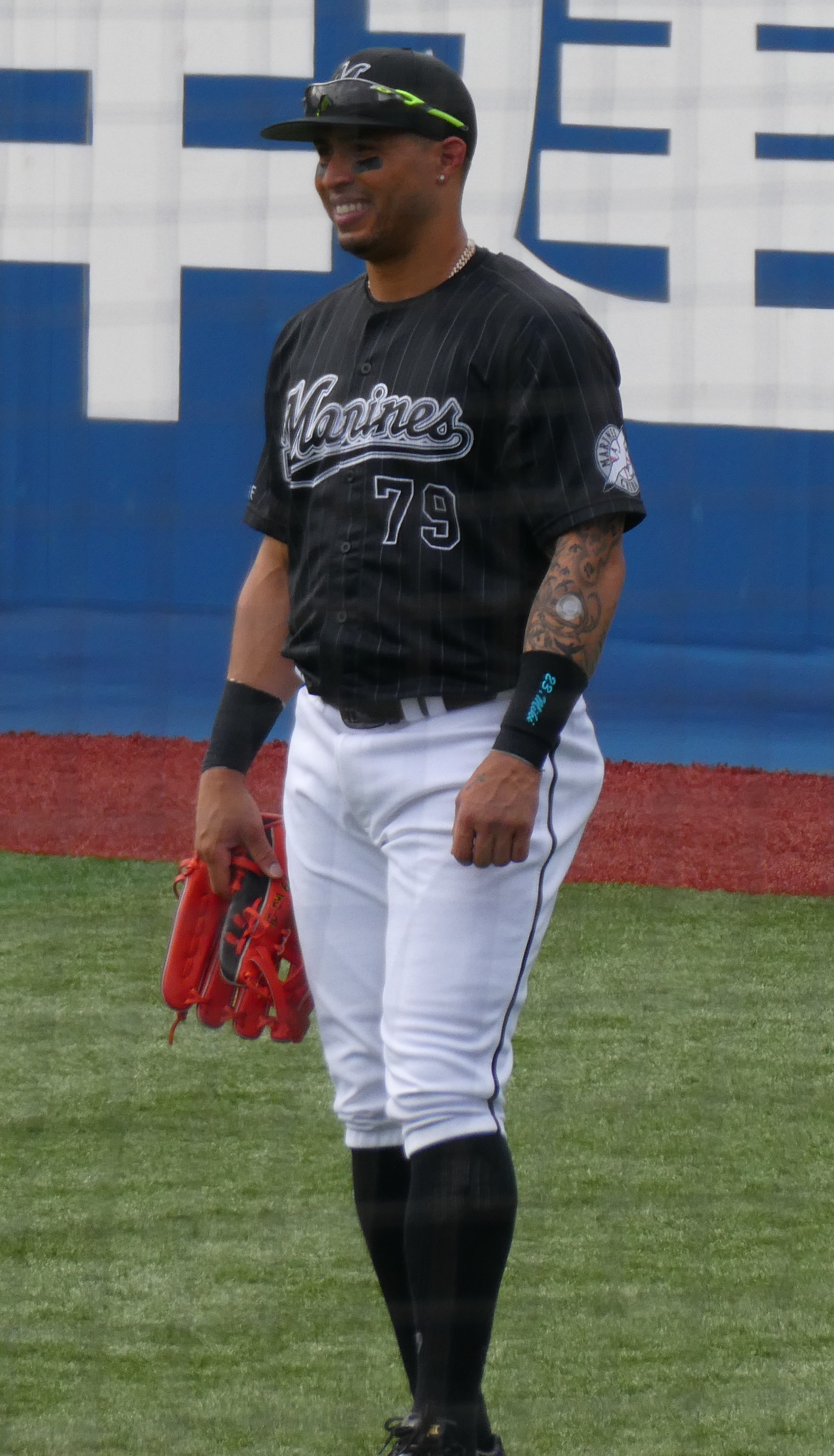
- Martín with the Chiba Lotte Marines

Free agent
- Center fielder
- Born: March 6, 1988 (age 38); Corralillo, Villa Clara, Cuba
- Bats: Left Throws: Right

Professional debut
- MLB: September 2, 2011, for the Texas Rangers
- NPB: July 26, 2019, for the Chiba Lotte Marines

MLB statistics (through 2019 season)
- Batting average: .244
- Home runs: 58
- Runs batted in: 228
- Stolen bases: 126

NPB statistics (through 2022 season)
- Batting average: .220
- Home runs: 75
- Runs batted in: 204
- Stats at Baseball Reference

Teams
- Texas Rangers (2011–2015); Seattle Mariners (2016–2017); Chicago Cubs (2017); Detroit Tigers (2018); Cleveland Indians (2018–2019); Chiba Lotte Marines (2019–2022)

Career highlights and awards
- NPB All-Star (2021)

Leonys Martín Tápanes (born March 6, 1988), nicknamed "Ikadi", is a Cuban-American professional baseball center fielder who is a free agent. He signed with the Texas Rangers in 2011, and made his MLB debut later that season. He has previously played in Major League Baseball (MLB) for the Rangers, Seattle Mariners, Chicago Cubs, Detroit Tigers, and Cleveland Indians, and in Nippon Professional Baseball (NPB) for the Chiba Lotte Marines.

Born in Cuba, he played locally for Villa Clara of the Cuban National Series, and for the Cuban national baseball team in international competitions, including the 2009 World Baseball Classic. While in Taiwan for the 2010 World University Baseball Championship, Martín defected from Cuba in order to become a Major League Baseball free agent.

== Early life ==
Martín was born in Villa Clara Province in Cuba. He was named after Lionel Richie, his mother's favorite musical artist. His father worked as a foreman for a fishing company, while his mother raised Martín and his four siblings, a brother and three sisters. Martín's father taught Leonys to play baseball.

Martin learned to play baseball from his father, who coached him in youth baseball. Martín played shortstop, second base and third base before becoming a center fielder.

== Career ==
=== Cuba ===
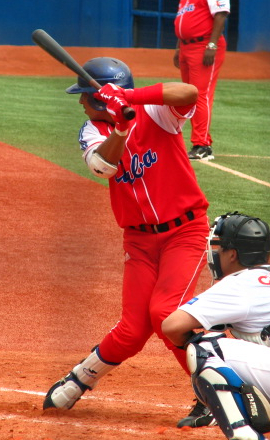
Martín with the Cuban national team in 2010 World University Baseball Championship

At the age of 17, Martín joined Villa Clara in the Cuban National Series. He also played for the Cuban national baseball team. Martín earned $40 a week. In the 2009–2010 season, Martín batted .326 with 10 home runs, 23 doubles, and 48 runs batted in (RBI). In five seasons with Villa Clara, Martín batted .314.

For the Cuban national team, Martín appeared in the 2006 World Junior Baseball Championship. He appeared in the 2009 World Port Tournament, which Cuba won. He was also named to the roster for the 2009 World Baseball Classic as the team's fourth outfielder. He was the youngest player on the team, Aroldis Chapman being six days older. Martín also played for Cuba in the 2010 World Junior Baseball Championship, where he batted 9-for-20 (.450), scored 14 runs, and had two doubles and eight walks.

Martín defected from Cuba during the 2010 World Junior Baseball Championship. He traveled to Tokyo, before arriving in Mexico, where he successfully petitioned Major League Baseball to allow him to become a free agent.

=== Texas Rangers ===
Martín signed a five-year, $15.5 million contract that includes a $5 million signing bonus with the Texas Rangers on May 4, 2011, with the Rangers adding Martín to their 40 man roster. He reported to extended spring training with the Rangers before they assigned him to the Frisco RoughRiders, the Rangers' Double-A affiliate in the Texas League. After batting .348 with a .435 on-base percentage (OBP) with Frisco, the Rangers promoted Martín to the Round Rock Express of the Triple-A Pacific Coast League in July. He also spent two days working on baserunning and defense with Rangers coach Gary Pettis.

For the Express, Martín batted .263 with no home runs, and 17 runs batted in (RBI) in 175 at bats. The Rangers promoted Martín to the major leagues on August 30, 2011, when Nelson Cruz went on the disabled list. Making his major league debut on September 2, Martín recorded his first MLB hit against Tim Wakefield of the Boston Red Sox. Appearing in eight games for the Rangers, Martín recorded three hits in eight at bats, including one double. The Rangers added Martín to their roster for the 2011 American League Division Series, but he did not make an appearance.

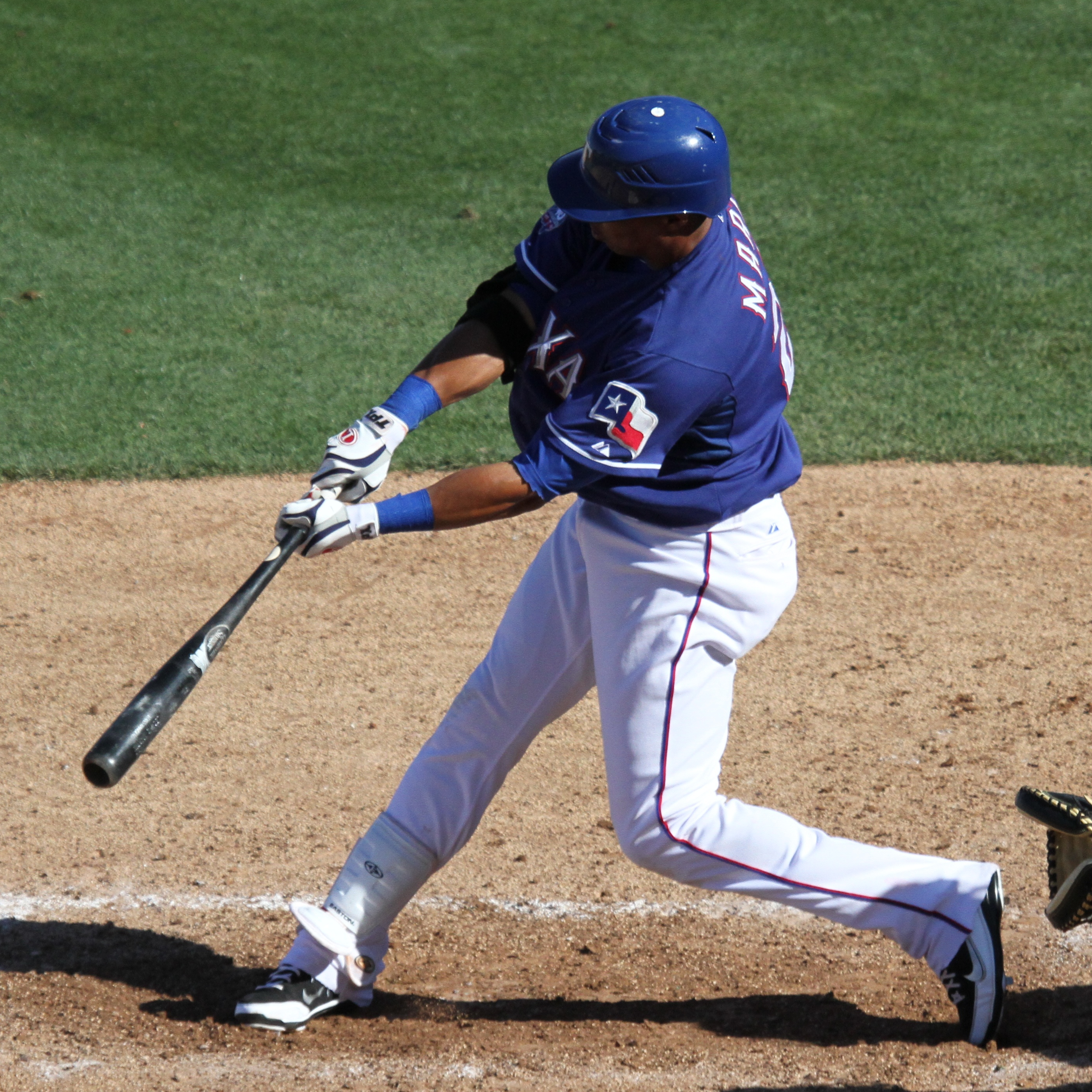
Martín with the Texas Rangers in 2012

The Rangers optioned Martín to Round Rock during spring training in 2012. After batting .344 with a .414 OBP and .547 slugging percentage with five home runs in 31 games for Round Rock to start the 2012 season, the Rangers promoted Martín on June 15, when they placed Koji Uehara on the disabled list.

In 2013, Martín made the Rangers' 25 man roster and started at center field on Opening Day against the Houston Astros. On April 21, Martín hit the 1st home run of his major league career off of Aaron Harang of the Seattle Mariners. On June 25, Martín collected the first multi-home run game of his major league career with two solo shots against Hiroki Kuroda of the New York Yankees. Martín hit .260 for the 2013 season and stole a career-high 36 bases.

Martín played a full season in 2014, hitting .274 with 31 stolen bases over a career-high 155 games. He suffered an injury in 2015 and played only 95 games, while his batting average sank to .219.

=== Seattle Mariners ===
After the 2015 season, the Rangers traded Martín and Anthony Bass to the Seattle Mariners for Tom Wilhelmsen, James Jones, and a player to be named later (Patrick Kivlehan).

Martín set a career-high in home runs in 2016 (15), despite moving from a team playing their home games in an extreme hitter's park to a team playing their home games in an extreme pitcher's park.

Martín was designated for assignment by the Mariners on April 23, 2017. He was outrighted to Triple-A until he had his contract purchased by the team at the end of July. On August 23, he was designated for assignment for a second time.

=== Chicago Cubs ===
On August 31, 2017, the Chicago Cubs acquired Martín and cash for a player to be named later or cash from the Mariners. Between the two teams in 2017 he batted .172/.232/.281. Martin made the Cubs 2017 playoff roster due to his above average speed and defense. He was outrighted to Triple-A on November 6, 2017, and elected free agency later that day.

=== Detroit Tigers ===
On December 5, 2017, the Detroit Tigers signed Martín to a one-year, $1.75 million deal. Martín hit his first career grand slam on April 19, 2018, off Mike Wright of the Baltimore Orioles. On April 25, Martín hit a home run in both games of a doubleheader against the Pittsburgh Pirates, becoming the first Tiger player to do so since Don Kelly on October 1, 2010. On May 8, Martín was placed on the 10-day disabled list with a hamstring strain. On July 2, he was placed on the disabled list for the second time with a hamstring injury. For the season with Detroit he batted .251/.321/.409.

=== Cleveland Indians ===
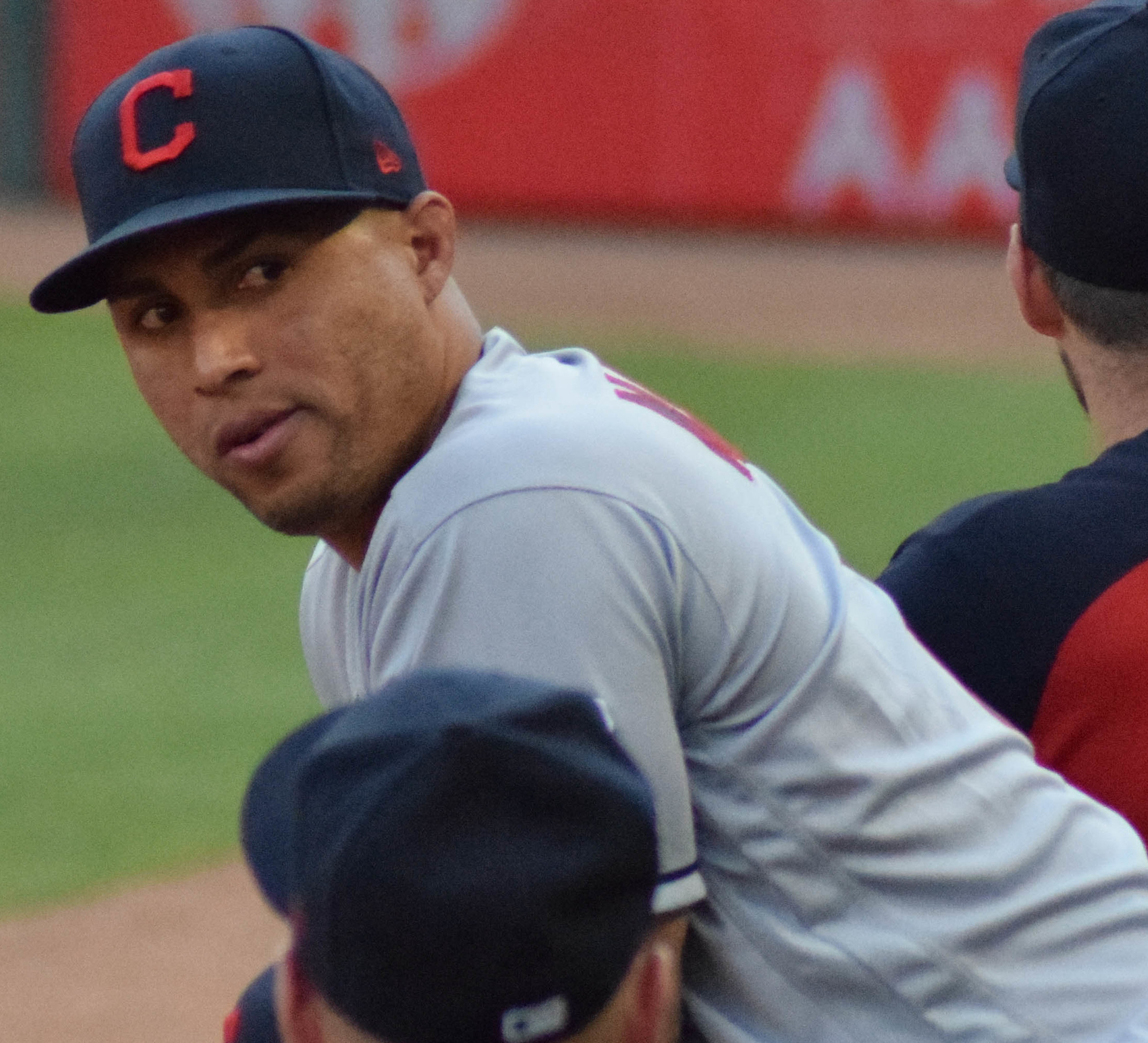
Martín with the Cleveland Indians in 2019

On July 31, 2018, Martín and Kyle Dowdy were traded to the Cleveland Indians in exchange for Willi Castro. Nine days later Martín was placed on the 10-day disabled after an undisclosed illness. He was admitted to the Cleveland Clinic on August 9, where he received care in the Intensive Care Unit. On August 13, Indians president of baseball operations Chris Antonetti announced Martín was recovering from a life-threatening bacterial infection and that there was no timetable for Martín's return to baseball activities. On August 22, the Indians ruled Martín out for the remainder of the season as a precaution. In 2018, he had only 15 at-bats for Cleveland.

Martín signed a one-year contract for the 2019 season with the Indians on October 31, 2018, avoiding salary arbitration. In 65 appearances for Cleveland in 2019, he batted .199/.276/.343 with nine home runs, 19 RBI, and four stolen bases. On June 22, 2019, Martín was designated for assignment by the Indians. After clearing waivers, Martín was released by Cleveland on June 27.

=== Chiba Lotte Marines ===
On July 14, 2019, Martín signed with the Chiba Lotte Marines of Nippon Professional Baseball (NPB). He played in 52 games for Lotte, posting a slash of .232/.342/.495 with 14 home runs and 39 RBI. On December 2, 2019, Martín signed a one-year extension to remain with the Marines. Appearing in 104 games for the Marines in 2020, Martín hit .234/.382/.485 with 25 home runs, 65 RBI, and 7 stolen bases.

He signed a two-year extension with the Marines after the 2020 season. He played in 116 games for Lotte in 2021, slashing .233/.355/.500 with 27 home runs and 75 RBI. In 2022, Martín made 68 appearances for Lotte, hitting .163/.293/.317 with 9 home runs and 25 RBI.

=== Seattle Mariners (second stint) ===
On February 9, 2023, Martín signed a minor league contract with the Seattle Mariners with a non-roster invite to spring training. He went 5-for-19 and struck out nine times in spring training before he was released on March 23.

=== Conspiradores de Querétaro ===
On January 16, 2024, Martín signed with the Conspiradores de Querétaro of the Mexican League. In 82 appearances for Querétaro, he batted .305/.410/.630 with 29 home runs, 74 RBI, and three stolen bases.

Martín made 32 appearances for the Conspiradores in 2025, slashing .266/.372/.444 with five home runs, 20 RBI, and three stolen bases.

=== Sultanes de Monterrey ===
On May 30, 2025, Martín was traded to the Sultanes de Monterrey of the Mexican League in exchange for Daniel Castro, Tyler Viza, and Michel Báez. In 32 appearances for Monterrey, Martín batted .237/.372/.355 with two home runs, nine RBI, and two stolen bases.

=== Bravos de León ===
On February 6, 2026, Martín was traded to the Bravos de León of the Mexican League in exchange for pitcher Jared Wilson. He did not report to the team at all during the 2026 season.

== Personal life ==
Martín's parents are divorced. His mother, brother and three sisters live in Cuba. His father lives in Miami.

On June 25, 2018, Martín became a naturalized United States citizen.

== See also ==
- List of baseball players who defected from Cuba
