= Henry Mateo =

Dominican baseball player (born 1976)

- Second baseman
- Born: October 14, 1976 (age 49); Santo Domingo, Dominican Republic
- Batted: Switch Threw: Right

Professional debut
- MLB: July 28, 2001, for the Montreal Expos
- CPBL: July 11, 2010, for the Uni-President 7-Eleven Lions

Last appearance
- MLB: October 1, 2006, for the Washington Nationals
- CPBL: October 3, 2010, for the Uni-President 7-Eleven Lions

MLB statistics
- Batting average: .233
- Home runs: 1
- Runs batted in: 10

CPBL statistics
- Batting average: .249
- Home runs: 1
- Runs batted in: 11
- Stats at Baseball Reference

Teams
- Montreal Expos / Washington Nationals (2001–2006); Uni-President 7-Eleven Lions (2010)
Medals
Men's baseball
Representing Dominican Republic
Central American and Caribbean Games
Bronze medal – third place	2014 Veracruz	Team

Henry Antonio Mateo Valera (born October 14, 1976) is a Dominican former professional baseball infielder. He played all or part of six seasons in Major League Baseball from 2001 to 2006, and part of the 2010 season in Chinese Professional Baseball League.

== Professional career ==
=== Expos/Nationals ===
Mateo was drafted by the Montreal Expos at age 18 in the second round of the 1995 amateur draft. He spent the next 6 years in the Expos' minor league system before making his major league debut in 2001. He remained with the team when they moved to Washington, D.C. and became the Nationals in 2005. After batting .154 in 2006, he was granted free agency after the season.

=== Tigers, Rays, and independent ball ===
In 2007, he signed with the Detroit Tigers, spending all of that season with their top farm team, the Toledo Mud Hens. He was released by the Detroit Tigers on April 21, 2008. Later in 2008 signed with the Bridgeport Bluefish of the Atlantic League of Professional Baseball. He batted .318 for the Bluefish and led his team in hits with 170. On May 24, 2009, Mateo was signed to a minor league contract by the Tampa Bay Rays and immediately optioned to the minor league Durham Bulls, where he ended the season. Mateo is currently being sought for the civil charge of criminal conversation in North Carolina.

=== Mexico and Taiwan ===
Mateo became a free agent again after the 2009 season. He then went to the Mexican League, signing with the Vaqueros Laguna. He was later traded to the Diablos Rojos del México, but was subsequently released. In July, Mateo was signed by Uni-President 7-Eleven Lions in Chinese Professional Baseball League in Taiwan. He finished the year there, and returned to Mexico with the Olmecas de Tabasco in 2011.
