= Patrick Kivlehan =

American baseball player (born 1989)

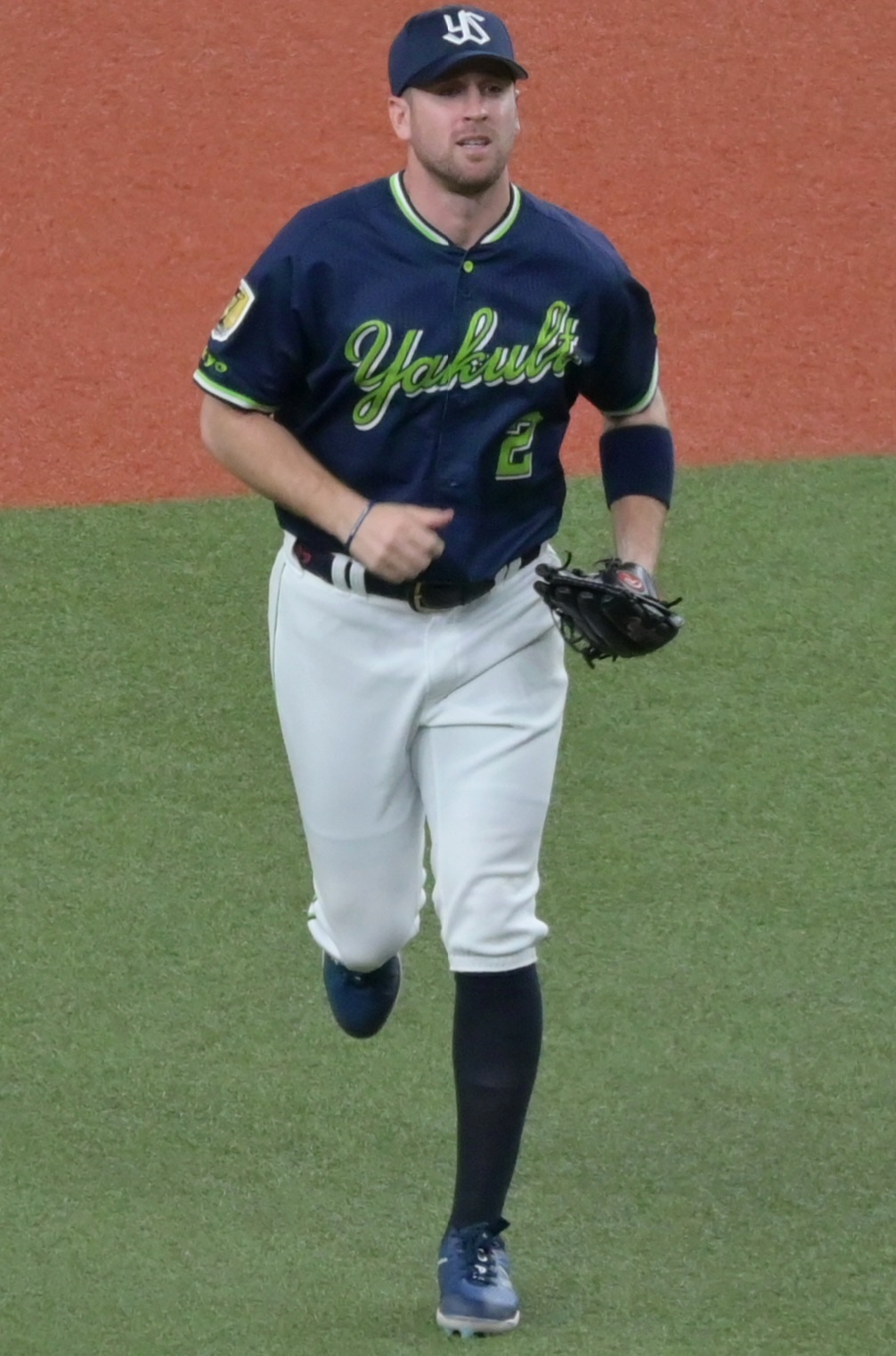
- Kivlehan with the Tokyo Yakult Swallows in 2022
- Outfielder
- Born: December 22, 1989 (age 36); Nyack, New York, U.S.
- Batted: Right Threw: Right

Professional debut
- MLB: August 20, 2016, for the San Diego Padres
- NPB: May 24, 2022, for the Tokyo Yakult Swallows

Last appearance
- MLB: May 16, 2021, for the San Diego Padres
- NPB: October 3, 2022, for the Tokyo Yakult Swallows

MLB statistics
- Batting average: .208
- Home runs: 10
- Runs batted in: 30

NPB statistics
- Batting average: .241
- Home runs: 6
- Runs batted in: 14
- Stats at Baseball Reference

Teams
- San Diego Padres (2016); Cincinnati Reds (2016–2017); Arizona Diamondbacks (2018); San Diego Padres (2021); Tokyo Yakult Swallows (2022)
Medals
Men's baseball
Representing United States
Pan American Games
Silver medal – second place	2015 Toronto	Team
Olympic Games
Silver medal – second place	2020 Tokyo	Team

Patrick Anthony Kivlehan (born December 22, 1989) is an American former professional baseball outfielder. He played in Major League Baseball (MLB) for the San Diego Padres, Cincinnati Reds, and Arizona Diamondbacks, and in Nippon Professional Baseball for the Tokyo Yakult Swallows. He currently serves as the athletic director at his alma mater St. Joseph Regional High School in Montvale, New Jersey.

== Career ==
Kivlehan played both college baseball and college football at Rutgers University. In his four years of football at Rutgers, he played in 43 games as a backup defensive back, recording 40 tackles and one interception. After his college football career ended after his senior season, he joined Rutgers baseball team. In his one season of baseball, he hit .392/.480/.693 with 14 home runs, 50 runs batted in (RBI) and 24 stolen bases in 51 games. For his play he was named the Big East Player of the Year.

=== Seattle Mariners ===
Kivlehan was drafted by the Seattle Mariners in the fourth round of the 2012 MLB draft. He made his professional debut that season for the Everett AquaSox.

In 72 games, he hit .301/.373/.511 with 12 home runs and 52 RBI. Kivlehan started the 2013 season with the Clinton LumberKings. After hitting .283/.344/.386 and three home runs in 60 games with Clinton, he was promoted to the High Desert Mavericks. In 68 games with High Desert he hit .320/.384/.530 with 13 home runs in 68 games. Overall, he hit .303/.366/.464 and 16 home runs. After the season, he played in the Arizona Fall League.

Kivlehan returned to High Desert to start 2014. After hitting nine home runs in 32 games, he was promoted to the Jackson Generals.

The Mariners added him to their 40-man roster after the 2015 season.

=== Texas Rangers ===
The Texas Rangers acquired Kivlehan from the Mariners on December 2, 2015, as a player to be named later from an earlier trade that sent Leonys Martín and Anthony Bass to the Mariners and Tom Wilhelmsen and James Jones to the Rangers.

=== Seattle Mariners (second stint) ===
On May 29, 2016, Kivlehan was traded back to the Mariners for a player to be named later or cash, later specified as pitcher Justin De Fratus.

=== San Diego Padres ===
On August 4, 2016, the San Diego Padres claimed Kivlehan off waivers. The Padres promoted him to the major leagues for the first time on August 20. Kivlehan hit his first career home run off Robbie Ray in his second big league at-bat. He made five appearances for the Padres, going 4-for-16 (.250) with one home run, two RBI, and two walks. Kivlehan was designated for assignment by the Padres on September 21.

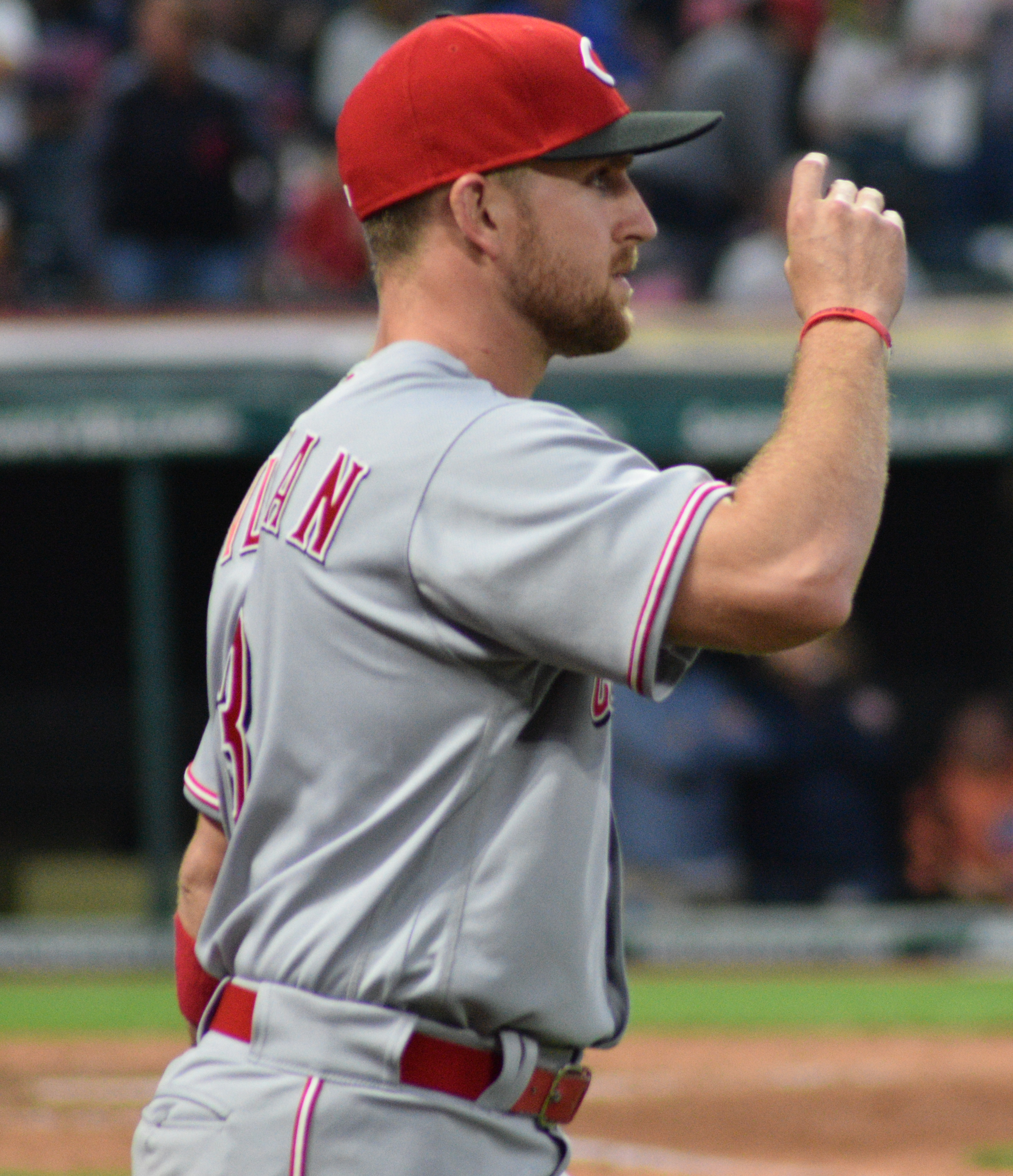
Kivlehan with the Reds in 2017

=== Cincinnati Reds ===
On September 28, 2016, Kivlehan was claimed off waivers by the Cincinnati Reds. He was designated for assignment on October 6.

Kivlehan made the Reds' Opening Day roster in 2017. He was outrighted to Triple-A on November 3, 2017, and elected free agency on November 6. On November 18, Kivlehan signed a minor league contract with the Reds that included an invitation to spring training. He was released from the organization in early May 2018.

=== New York Mets ===
On May 9, 2018, Kivlehan signed a minor league contract with the New York Mets.

=== Arizona Diamondbacks ===
On September 6, 2018, the Arizona Diamondbacks acquired Kivlehan from the Mets for cash considerations. He appeared in 9 games for the Diamondbacks before he was outrighted to Triple-A on October 10. The following day, he elected free agency.

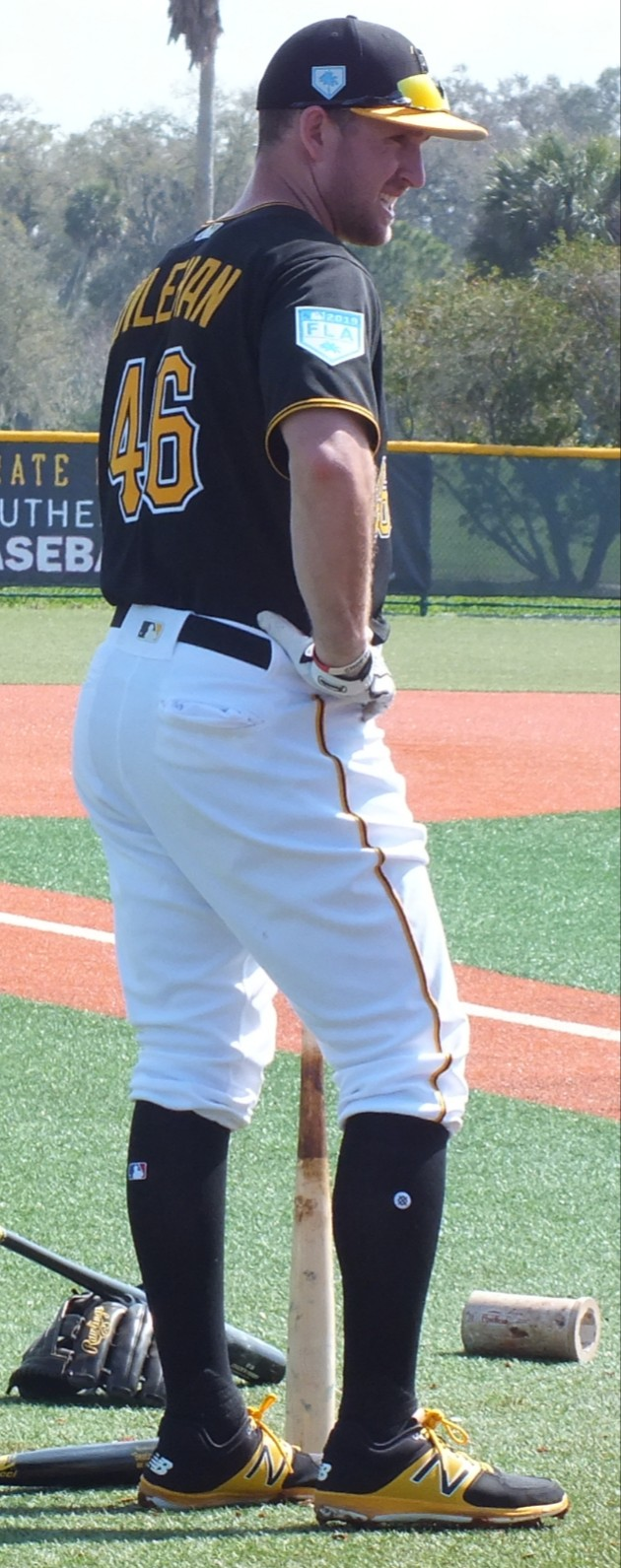
Kivlehan with the Pirates in 2019 spring training

=== Pittsburgh Pirates ===
On October 31, 2018, Kivlehan signed a minor league contract with the Pittsburgh Pirates. He played in 24 games for the Triple-A Indianapolis Indians in 2019, hitting .212/.287/.412 with four home runs and nine RBI.

=== Toronto Blue Jays ===
On May 10, 2019, Kivlehan was traded to the Toronto Blue Jays. He slashed .421/.477/.790 with three home runs and nine RBI in 11 games for the Double-A New Hampshire Fisher Cats. Kivlehan was then promoted to the Triple-A Buffalo Bisons, with whom he hit .247/.336/.534 with 25 home runs and 66 RBI across 90 appearances. He elected free agency following the season on November 4.

On December 2, 2019, Kivlehan re-signed with the Blue Jays on a minor league contract. He did not play in a game in 2020 due to the cancellation of the minor league season because of the COVID-19 pandemic. Kivlehan was released by the Blue Jays organization on August 16, 2020.

=== San Diego Padres (second stint) ===
On February 26, 2021, Kivlehan signed a minor league contract with the San Diego Padres organization that included an invitation to Spring Training. On May 12, 2021, Kivlehan was selected to the active roster. In 5 games with the Padres, Kivlehan went 1-for-4 with 2 walks and 2 RBI. On May 17, Kivlehan was returned to the Triple-A El Paso Chihuahuas.

=== Chicago White Sox ===
On February 21, 2022, Kivlehan signed a minor league contract with the Chicago White Sox. Kivlehan played in 3 games for the Triple-A Charlotte Knights, going 3-for-12 with 2 home runs and 3 RBI before he was released on April 12.

=== Tokyo Yakult Swallows ===
On April 29, 2022, Kivlehan signed a one-year, $480,000 contract with the Tokyo Yakult Swallows of Nippon Professional Baseball. Kivlehan played in 29 games for the Swallows, hitting .241/.264/.494 with 6 home runs and 14 RBI. He became a free agent following the season.

=== New York Boulders ===
On April 7, 2023, Kivlehan signed with the New York Boulders of the Frontier League as a player and assistant coach. In 89 games for the Boulders, he batted .304/.392/.586 with 23 home runs and 73 RBI. Kivlehan announced his retirement from professional baseball on September 9.

== International career ==
Kivlehan played for the United States national team at the 2020 Summer Olympics, contested in 2021 in Tokyo. The U.S. went on to win silver, falling to Japan in the gold-medal game. Kivlehan played in one game, going 0-for-3 against the Dominican Republic.

Kivlehan also won a silver medal playing for the U.S. in the 2015 Pan Am Games. In that tournament, he played in 10 of the team's 11 games, leading the Americans with 3 home runs and a .737 slugging percentage.
