= Alfredo Despaigne =

Cuban baseball player (born 1986)

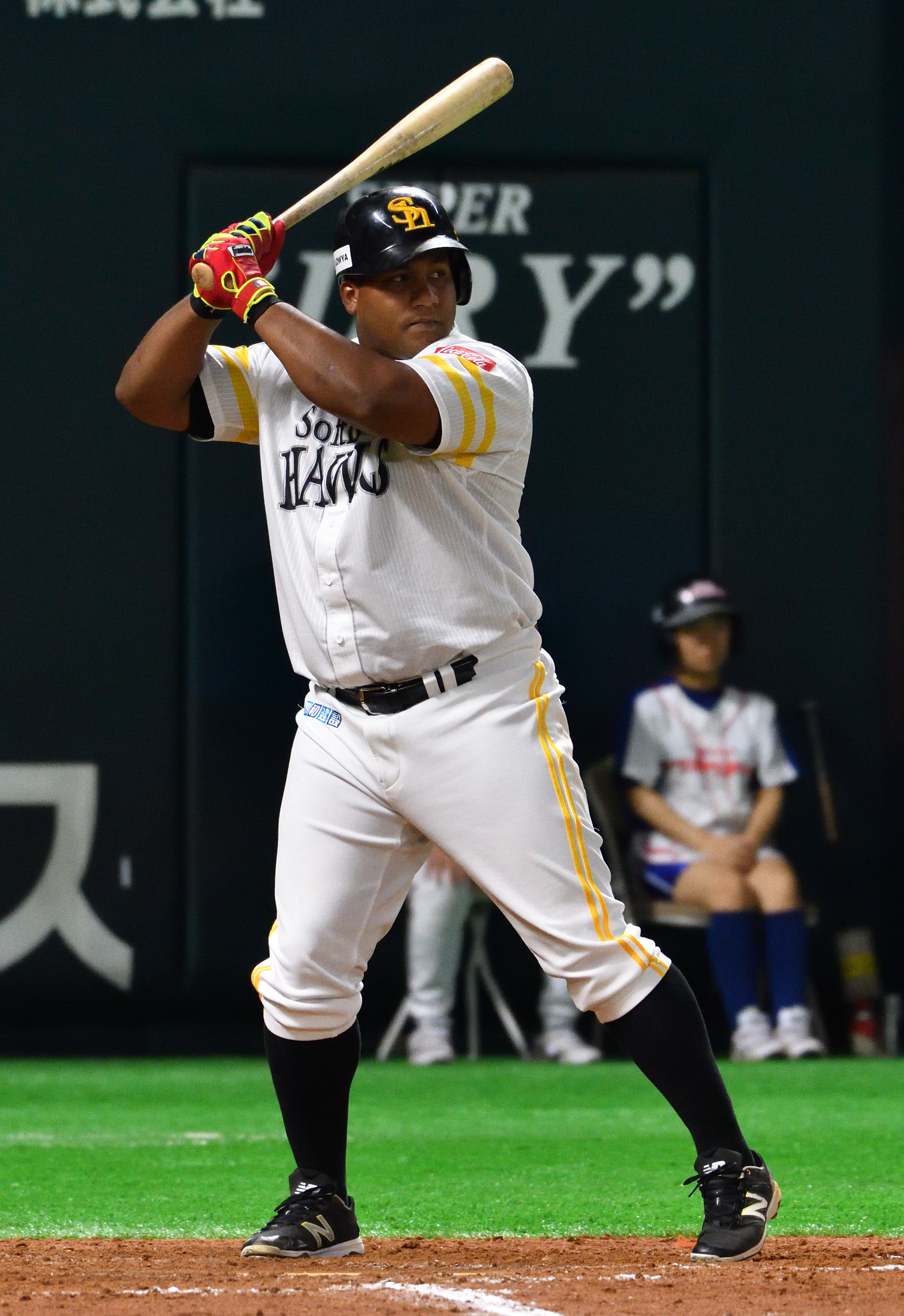
- Despaigne with the SoftBank Hawks in 2017

Alazanes de Granma – No. 54
- Outfielder / Designated hitter
- Born: June 17, 1986 (age 40); Palma Soriano, Santiago de Cuba, Cuba
- Bats: Right Throws: Right

NPB debut
- July, 29, 2014, for the Chiba Lotte Marines

NPB statistics (through 2023 season)
- Batting average: .261
- Home runs: 184
- Runs batted in: 545
- Stats at Baseball Reference

Teams
- Chiba Lotte Marines (2014–2016); Fukuoka SoftBank Hawks (2017–2023)

Career highlights and awards
- 4× Japan Series champion (2017–2020); 3× NPB All-Star (2017–2019); NPB All-Star MVP (2017); 2× PL Best Nine Award (2017, 2019); PL home run leader (2017); PL RBI leader (2017)
Medals
Men's baseball
Representing Cuba
Summer Olympics
Silver medal – second place	2008 Beijing	National team
Baseball World Cup
Silver medal – second place	2007 Taipei	National team
Silver medal – second place	2009 Nettuno	National team
Intercontinental Cup
Gold medal – first place	2010 Taichung	National team
Pan American Games
Bronze medal – third place	2011 Guadalajara	National team
Bronze medal – third place	2015 Toronto	National team
Central American and Caribbean Games
Gold medal – first place	2014 Veracruz	Team
World Junior Baseball Championship
Gold medal – first place	2004 Taipei	Team

Alfredo Despaigne Rodríguez (born June 17, 1986) is a Cuban professional baseball outfielder for the Alazanes de Granma of the Cuban National Series. He has previously played in Nippon Professional Baseball (NPB) for the Chiba Lotte Marines and the Fukuoka SoftBank Hawks.

== Career ==
In 2009, Despaigne had one of the most dominating seasons in Cuban baseball history, breaking the Cuban Home Run record while hitting .373 with 97 RBIs. Following the season, he was named MVP of the National Series. Despaigne was again excellent in 2010, ranking among the best hitters in various statistical categories. In 2012, he set a new Cuban league regular-season home run record, with 35.

=== Piratas de Campeche ===
On June 21, 2013, Despaigne signed with the Piratas de Campeche of the Mexican League. In 33 games, he slashed .338/.364/.564 with 8 home runs and 24 RBI. In 2014, Despaigne played in 20 games for Campeche, batting .346/.407/.603 with 5 home runs and 15 RBI.

=== Chiba Lotte Marines ===
On July 15, 2014, he signed with the Chiba Lotte Marines of the Nippon Professional Baseball (NPB). Despaigne appeared in 45 games, hitting .311, with 12 home runs and 33 runs batted in. After the season, on December 8, the Marines signed him to a two-year contract. In the 2015 season, Despaigne finished the regular season in 103 games with a batting average of .258, 18 home runs and a RBI of 62. In the 2016 season, Despaigne finished the regular season in 134 games with a batting average of .280, 24 home runs and a RBI of 92. On December 20, 2016, it was announced that team did not make a contract offer and next day he became free agent in NPB. In 2017, Despaigne played a key role in Granma's win of the Cuban National Series by hitting the game-winning home run in the first game of the finals.

=== Fukuoka SoftBank Hawks ===
On February 11, 2017, Despaigne signed with Fukuoka SoftBank Hawks of the NPB. In 2017 season, Despaigne finished the regular season in 136 games with a batting average of .262, 35 home runs and a RBI of 103. And he was honored for the Pacific League home run leader, the Pacific League RBI leader, and the Pacific League Best Nine Award at the NPB AWARDS 2017.

In the 2018 season, Despaigne finished the regular season in 116 games with a batting average of .238, 29 home runs and a RBI of 74. And he was selected 2018 NPB All-Star game.

In 2019, Despaigne finished the regular season in 130 games with a batting average of .259, 36 home runs and a RBI of 88. And he was honored for the Japan Series Outstanding Player Award at the 2019 Japan Series. On December 2, 2019, he become free agent.

On January 22, 2020, Despaigne signed a new two-year contract with Fukuoka SoftBank Hawks. However, due to the influence of the COVID-19 pandemic, he was unable to leave Cuba and was able to come to Japan on July 19. In the 2020 season, Despaigne finished the regular season in 25 games with a batting average of .224, 6 home runs and a RBI of 12. In the 2020 Japan Series against the Yomiuri Giants, he contributed to the team's fourth consecutive Japan Series champion by scoring 6 RBIs per game in the Japan Series equal to the current record, including a grand slam in Game 2 on November 22.

In 2021 season, Despaigne had a slump of .220 batting average, one home run, and six runs batted in in 27 games since the season opener, and was struck from the first team registration on May 3. Then, on May 24, he left for the U.S. to join the Cuba national baseball team for the Tokyo Olympics qualifiers. He returned to Japan on June 9, spent the prescribed quarantine period, and joined the team on August 1. In the match against the Chiba Lotte Marines on August 21, he recorded his first home run since the opening game. He returned to form in the second half of the season, and by September 30 his batting average was back up to .271. He finished the regular season with a .264 batting average, 10 home runs, and 41 RBI in 80 games, and re-signed with the Hawks at an estimated salary of 270 million yen.

In 2022 season, Despaigne did not make it to the opening game of the season after hurting his right ankle in the Cuban League. He finally joined the team on May 17. On June 3, he recorded his first home run of the season in the interleague play against the Chunichi Dragons. However, he tested positive for COVID-19 and was again removed from the first team registration by regulation on June 28. He returned to the team on July 13 and hit a two-run homer the next day, July 14, against the Orix Buffaloes. He finished the regular season with a .269 batting average, 14 home runs, and 40 runs batted in in 89 games, despite his frequent departures. He became a free agent following the 2022 season.

On May 31, 2023, Despaigne re-signed with the Hawks. However, he joined the team in July but was limited to only 20 appearances. On December 1, the Hawks announced they would release him.

=== Alazanes de Granma ===
Despaigne played the 2024 Cuban National Series for the Alazanes de Granma.

== International career ==
Despaigne posted an impressive season in 2007, afterwards earning a key role on Cuba's National Team. He was selected the 2004 World Junior Baseball Championship, 2007 World Port Tournament, 2007 Baseball World Cup, 2008 Summer Olympics, 2009 World Baseball Classic, 2010 World University Baseball Championship, 2010 Intercontinental Cup, 2011 Pan American Games, 2012 exhibition games against Chinese Taipei and CPBL All-Stars, 2012 exhibition games against Japan, 2013 World Baseball Classic, 2014 Central American and Caribbean Games, 2015 Pan American Games, 2015 WBSC Premier12 and 2017 World Baseball Classic.

He was named the Best Hitter at the 2007 World Port Tournament, and was also a part of the Cuban team which won a silver medal at the 2008 Summer Olympics.

Despaigne won with his national team the gold medal of the 2014 Central American and Caribbean Games in Veracruz, Mexico.
