= Ajax Sportsplex =

Sports venue in Ajax, Ontario, Canada

- Pan Am Ball Park
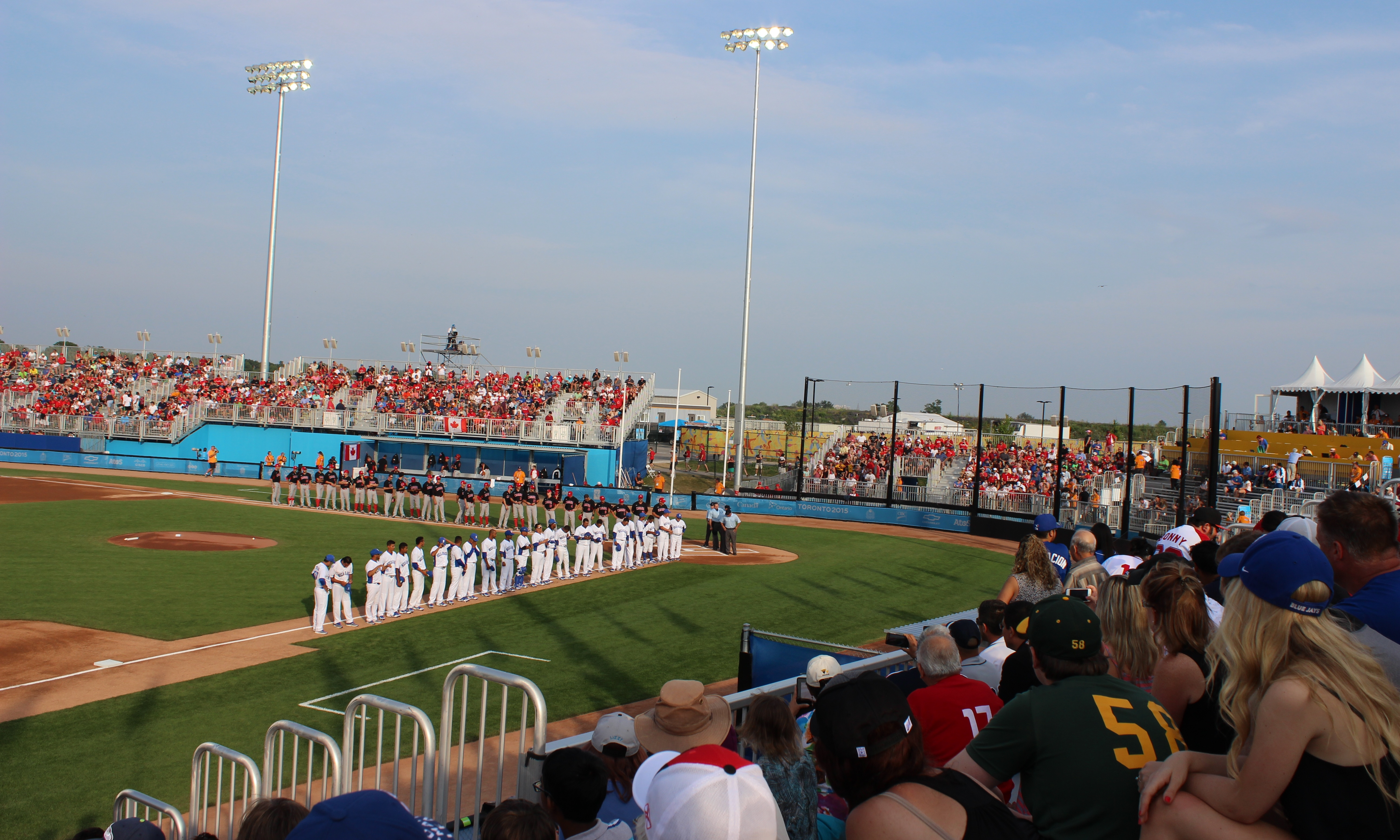
- Interactive map of Ajax Sportsplex
- Former names: President's Choice Ajax Ballpark
- Location: 1803-1843 Audley Road, Ajax, Ontario
- Coordinates: 43°54′06″N 79°00′30″W
- Owner: Town of Ajax
- Capacity: (temporary) Two 5,000 seat stadiums Two 1,200 seat stadiums (12,400 total)

Construction
- Built: 2013-2014
- Opened: 2015

Tenants
- 2015 Pan American Games; 2017 North American Indigenous Games; Ajax Spartans Minor Baseball Association

The Ajax Sportsplex is a baseball and softball facility located in Ajax, Ontario, Canada that hosted the baseball and softball competitions at the 2015 Pan American Games. During the games the venue was known as the President's Choice Ajax Ballpark.

== Description ==
The facility consists of four softball diamonds and two baseball diamonds at Taunton Road and Audley Road in north east Ajax. Prior to the games the facility received 9 million dollars in upgrades to ensure it met World Baseball Softball Confederation standards, which included converting two soccer fields into a baseball diamond and the adjacent existing baseball diamond being rebuilt with new sod and clay. During the games the Sportsplex housed four stadiums. Two premier fields had temporary seating for 5,000 each, with one being for baseball and one for softball and two competition fields had 1,200 seats each (one for each sport).

== Requirements ==
The Organizers set a few benchmarks for selecting the venue.

- The venue was owned by the city.
- The venue was within the games area.
- The site would ideally have a training facility as well.
- The facility would be ready to start construction in late March 2013.
- A binding agreement would have to be signed by end of July 2012.
- Easy access to public transit.
- Agree to cover 44% of the costs.

Hamilton and Vaughan considered bidding, but ultimately chose not to.

== Photo gallery ==
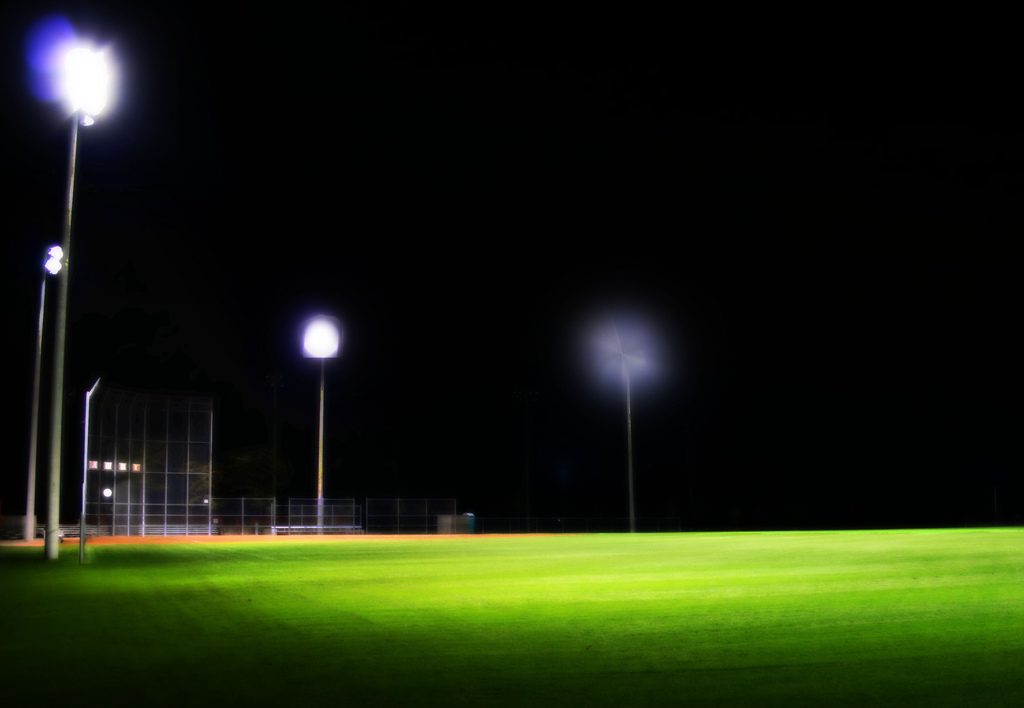
Ajax Sportsplex prior to the Pan Am Games

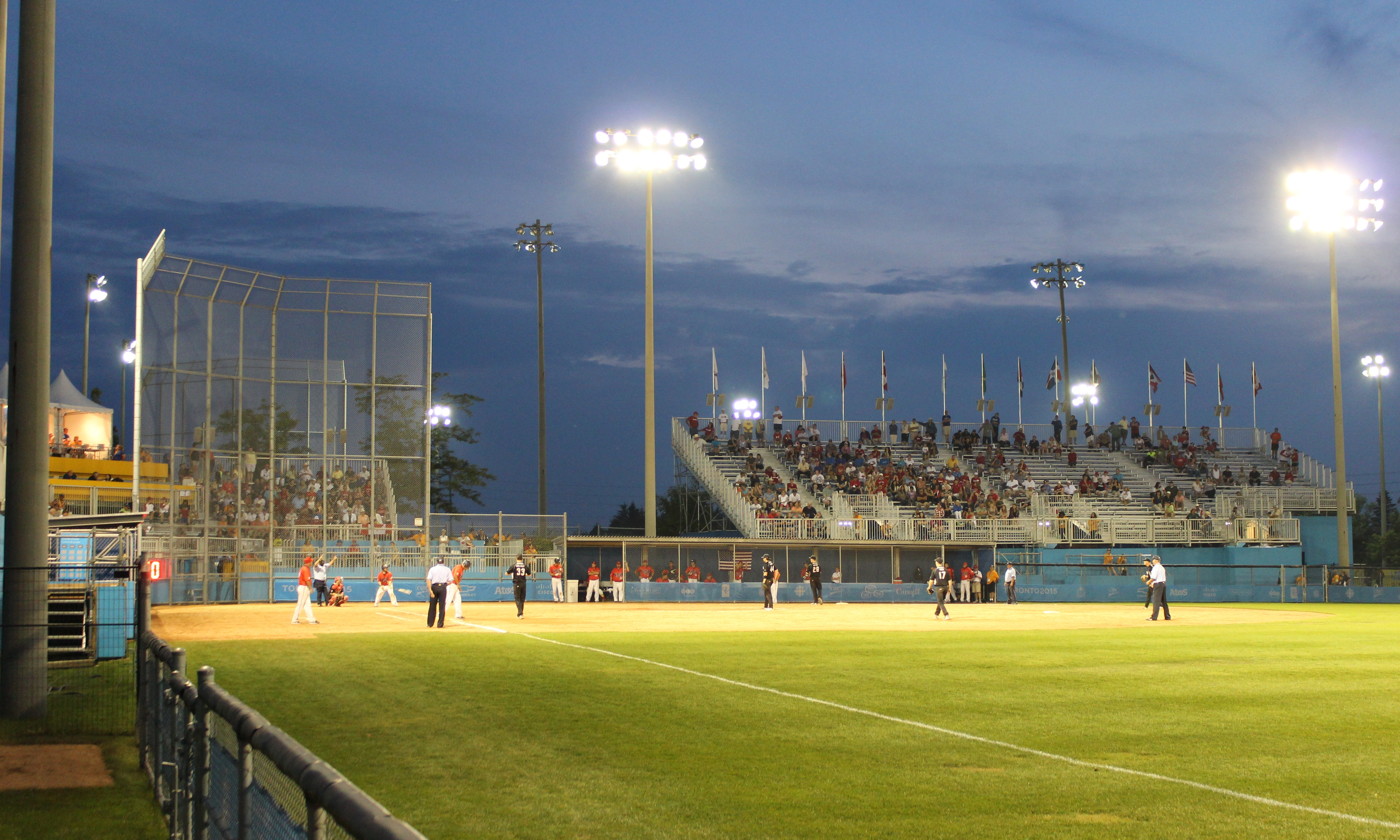
Canada versus USA Pan Am Softball diamond #3

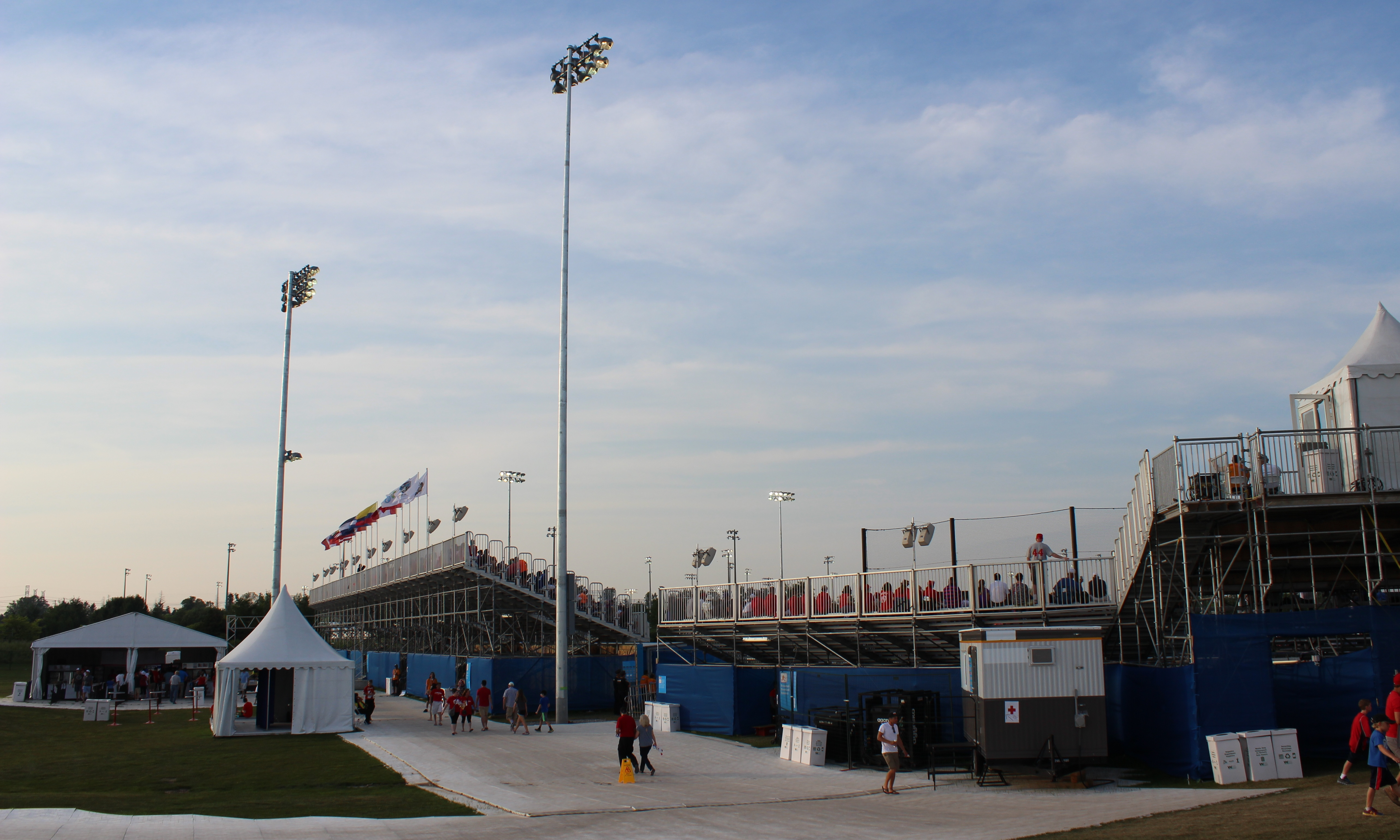
Temporary seating during Pan Am Games

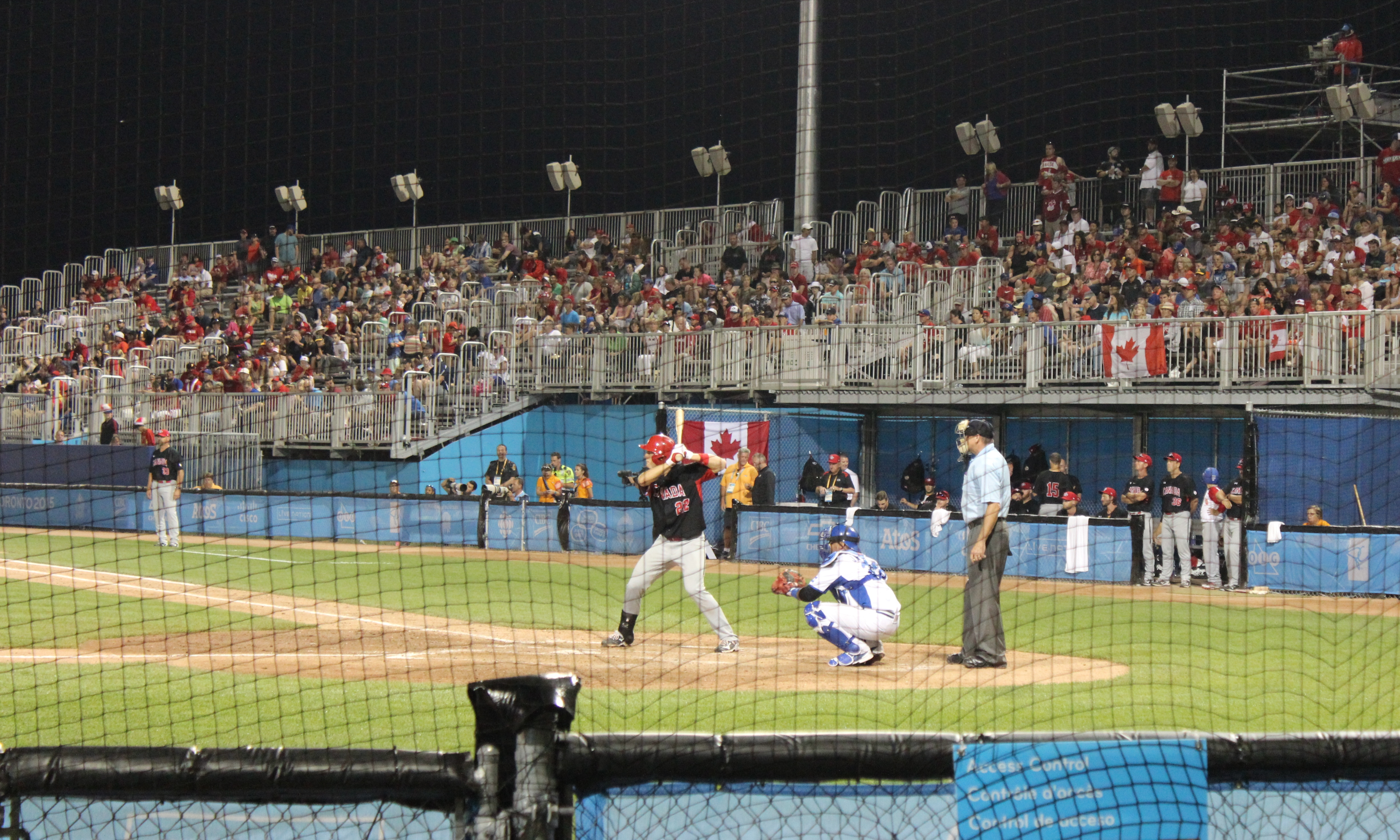
Team Canada playing diamond #1

== See also ==
- Venues of the 2015 Pan American and Parapan American Games
