= Yosvani Torres =

Cuban baseball player

- Pitcher
- Born: 14 June 1980 (age 46); Viñales, Pinar del Río Province, Cuba
- Bats: Right Throws: Right
- Stats at Baseball Reference
Medals
Men's baseball
Representing Cuba
Pan American Games
Bronze medal – third place	2015 Toronto	Team

Yosvani Torres Gómez (born 14 June 1980) is a Cuban former baseball pitcher. Torres played eighteen seasons in the Cuban National Series, mainly for Pinar del Río. He also represented Cuba at the 2015 Pan American Games, winning the bronze medal and the 2017 World Baseball Classic.

== Career ==
Torres was born on 14 June 1980 in Viñales, Pinar del Río Province. He made his debut in the Cuban National Series in 2005, playing for Pinar del Río, where he stayed for most of his career. He also appeared for Holguín, Villa Clara and Matanzas. He retired after the 2021–22 season.

Torres played for the Cuba national baseball team at the 2011 World Port Tournament, 2015 Pan American Games and 2017 World Baseball Classic.
