= 2006 World Baseball Classic rosters =

Lists of baseball players

2006 World Baseball Classic

The following is a list of squads for each nation competing at 2006 World Baseball Classic. The tournament began on March 3 and the final took place on March 20, 2006.

The teams listed on the country's roster is the team the player was with while the tournament took place.

== Pool A ==
=== China ===
China Roster

Manager: (United States) Jim Lefebvre

Coaches: (United States) Bruce Hurst (Pitching)

Pos.	No.	Player	Date of birth (age)	Bats	Throws	Club
P	6	Chenhao Li	July 2, 1977 (aged 28)	R	R	(China) Beijing Tigers
P	7	Nan Wang	October 7, 1981 (aged 24)	R	L	(China) Beijing Tigers
P	15	Quansheng Zhao	January 15, 1979 (aged 27)	L	L	(China) Tianjin Lions
P	17	Li Zhang	February 3, 1980 (aged 26)	R	R	(China) Shanghai Golden Eagles
P	21	Zheng Xu	May 10, 1981 (aged 24)	R	R	(China) Beijing Tigers
P	22	Hongrui Li	April 22, 1986 (aged 19)	R	R	(China) Beijing Tigers
P	23	Shuai Li	July 11, 1985 (aged 20)	R	R	(China) Henan Elephants
P	24	Quan Huang	May 14, 1983 (aged 22)	L	L	(China) Chinese Hopestars
P	28	Bo Zhao	August 11, 1985 (aged 20)	L	R	(China) Sichuan Dragons
P	33	Kun Chen	March 5, 1980 (aged 25)	R	R	(China) Sichuan Dragons
P	68	Bu Tao	January 15, 1983 (aged 23)	L	L	
P	80	Lai Guojun		R	R	
P	66	Zhang Jun	December 13, 1983 (aged 22)			
C	12	Feng Yi	August 20, 1982 (aged 23)	R	R	
C	56	Wang Wei	December 25, 1978 (aged 27)	R	R	
C	2	Zhang Zhenwang	March 1, 1988 (aged 18)	R	R	
IF	20	Chen Qi	September 23, 1981 (aged 24)	L	L	
IF	3	Chen Zhe	October 14, 1975 (aged 30)	R	R	
IF	5	Feng Fei	February 18, 1983 (aged 23)	R		
IF	11	Guo Tao	March 21, 1987 (aged 18)	R	R	
IF	51	Li Lei	June 24, 1984 (aged 21)	R	R	
IF	10	Liu Guangbiao	September 5, 1978 (aged 27)	R	R	
IF	37	Pan Wenbin	December 9, 1986 (aged 19)	R	R	
IF	32	Wang Jingchao	July 13, 1988 (aged 17)	R	R	
IF	18	Yang Guogang	February 22, 1977 (aged 29)	L	R	
IF	9	Zhang Yufeng	February 9, 1977 (aged 29)	R	R	
OF	26	Liu Yaqing	July 17, 1982 (aged 23)	L	R	
OF	1	Sun Lingfeng	August 14, 1978 (aged 27)	L	L	
OF	35	Yang Shuo	May 18, 1981 (aged 24)	R	R	
OF	36	Zhang Hongbo	June 6, 1980 (aged 25)	L	R	

=== Chinese Taipei ===
Chinese Taipei Roster

Manager: Lin Hua-wei (林華韋)

Coaches: Hung I-chung (洪一中), Yeh Chih-shien (葉志仙), Lu Ming-tsu (呂明賜), Wu Fu-lien (吳復連), Hsieh Chang-heng (謝長亨)

Pos.	No.	Player	Date of birth (age)	Bats	Throws	Club
P	97	Chiang Chien-ming (姜建銘)	May 27, 1985 (aged 20)	R	R	(Japan) Yomiuri Giants
P	59	Chu Wei-ming (朱尉銘)	August 2, 1981 (aged 24)	R	R	(Taiwan) Chinatrust Whales
P	17	Hsu Chu-chien (許竹見)	January 25, 1981 (aged 25)	R	R	(Taiwan) Macoto Cobras
P	63	Hsu Wen-hsiung (許文雄)	December 5, 1978 (aged 27)	R	R	(Taiwan) La New Bears
P	32	Kevin Huang (黃俊中)	April 25, 1982 (aged 23)	R	R	(Taiwan) La New Bears
P	88	Keng Po-hsuan (耿伯軒)	October 15, 1984 (aged 21)	R	R	(United States) Dunedin Blue Jays
P	37	Hong-Chih Kuo (郭泓志)	July 23, 1981 (aged 24)	L	L	(United States) Los Angeles Dodgers
P	11	Lin En-yu (林恩宇)	March 25, 1981 (aged 24)	R	R	(Taiwan) Macoto Cobras
P	19	Lin Ying-chieh (林英傑)	May 1, 1981 (aged 24)	L	L	(Japan) Tohoku Rakuten Golden Eagles
P	18	Pan Wei-lun (潘威倫)	March 5, 1982 (aged 23)	R	R	(Taiwan) Uni-President Lions
P	70	Tsai Ying-feng (蔡英峰)	May 26, 1983 (aged 22)	R	R	(Taiwan) La New Bears
P	42	Tseng Sung-wei (增菘瑋)	December 28, 1984 (aged 21)	R	R	National Taiwan College of Physical Education
P	46	Yang Chien-fu (陽建福)	April 22, 1979 (aged 26)	R	R	(Taiwan) Sinon Bulls
P	91	Yang Yao-hsun (陽耀勳)	January 22, 1983 (aged 23)	L	L	(Japan) Fukuoka SoftBank Hawks
C	41	Chen Feng-min (陳峰民)	October 29, 1977 (aged 28)	R	R	(Taiwan) La New Bears
C	34	Kao Chih-kang (高志綱)	February 27, 1981 (aged 25)	R	R	(Taiwan) Uni-President Lions
C	27	Yeh Chun-chang (葉君璋)	October 25, 1972 (aged 33)	R	R	(Taiwan) Sinon Bulls
IF	12	Chang Chia-hao (張家浩)	October 31, 1976 (aged 29)	L	R	(Taiwan) Sinon Bulls
IF	49	Chang Tai-shan (張泰山)	October 31, 1976 (aged 29)	R	R	(Taiwan) Sinon Bulls
IF	13	Chen Yung-chi (陳鏞基)	July 13, 1983 (aged 22)	R	R	(United States) Inland Empire 66ers
IF	31	Cheng Chan-ming (鄭昌明)	January 28, 1978 (aged 28)	R	R	(Taiwan) Chinatrust Whales
IF	51	Chin-Lung Hu (胡金龍)	February 2, 1984 (aged 22)	R	R	(United States) Jacksonville Suns
IF	7	Ngayaw Ake (林智勝)	January 1, 1982 (aged 24)	R	R	(Taiwan) La New Bears
IF	15	Dai-Kang Yang (陽仲壽)	January 17, 1987 (aged 19)	R	R	(Japan) Hokkaido Nippon Ham Fighters
IF	6	Yang Sen (陽森)	March 25, 1981 (aged 24)	L	R	(Taiwan) Uni-President Lions
OF	8	Chan Chih-yao (詹智堯)	January 2, 1983 (aged 23)	L	L	National Taiwan College of Physical Education
OF	69	Chang Chien-ming (張建銘)	July 27, 1980 (aged 25)	L	L	(Taiwan) Sinon Bulls
OF	55	Hsieh Chia-hsien (謝佳賢)	April 8, 1976 (aged 29)	L	L	(Taiwan) Macoto Cobras
OF	30	Huang Lung-yi (黃龍義)	February 20, 1979 (aged 27)	R	R	(Taiwan) La New Bears
OF	24	Lin Wei-chu (林威助)	January 22, 1979 (aged 27)	L	L	(Japan) Hanshin Tigers

=== Japan ===
Manager: 89 – Sadaharu Oh (王貞治)

Coaches: 84 – Kazuhiro Takeda (武田一浩), 85 – Hatsuhiko Tsuji (辻発彦), 86 – Yoshitaka Katori (鹿取義隆), 87 – Yasunori Oshima (大島康徳), 88 – Sumio Hirota (弘田澄男)

Pos.	No.	Player	Date of birth (age)	Bats	Throws	Club
P	11	Naoyuki Shimizu (清水直行)	November 24, 1975 (aged 30)	R	R	(Japan) Chiba Lotte Marines
P	12	Soichi Fujita (藤田宗一)	October 17, 1972 (aged 33)	L	L	(Japan) Chiba Lotte Marines
P	15	Tomoyuki Kubota (久保田智之)	January 30, 1981 (aged 25)	R	R	(Japan) Hanshin Tigers
P	18	Daisuke Matsuzaka (松坂大輔)	September 13, 1980 (aged 25)	R	R	(Japan) Seibu Lions
P	19	Koji Uehara (上原浩治)	April 3, 1975 (aged 30)	R	R	(Japan) Yomiuri Giants
P	20	Yasuhiko Yabuta (薮田安彦)	June 19, 1973 (aged 32)	R	R	(Japan) Chiba Lotte Marines
P	21	Tsuyoshi Wada (和田毅)	February 21, 1981 (aged 25)	L	L	(Japan) Fukuoka SoftBank Hawks
P	24	Kyuji Fujikawa (藤川球児)	July 21, 1980 (aged 25)	L	R	(Japan) Hanshin Tigers
P	31	Shunsuke Watanabe (渡辺俊介)	August 27, 1976 (aged 29)	R	R	(Japan) Chiba Lotte Marines
P	40	Akinori Otsuka (大塚晶則)	January 13, 1972 (aged 34)	R	R	(United States) Texas Rangers
P	41	Hiroyuki Kobayashi (小林宏之)	June 4, 1976 (aged 29)	R	R	(Japan) Chiba Lotte Marines
P	47	Toshiya Sugiuchi (杉内俊哉)	October 30, 1980 (aged 25)	L	L	(Japan) Fukuoka SoftBank Hawks
P	61	Hirotoshi Ishii (石井弘寿)	September 14, 1977 (aged 28)	L	L	(Japan) Tokyo Yakult Swallows
P	61	Takahiro Mahara (馬原孝浩)	December 8, 1981 (aged 24)	R	R	(Japan) Fukuoka SoftBank Hawks
C	22	Tomoya Satozaki (里崎智也)	May 20, 1976 (aged 29)	R	R	(Japan) Chiba Lotte Marines
C	27	Motonobu Tanishige (谷繁元信)	December 21, 1970 (aged 35)	R	R	(Japan) Chunichi Dragons
C	59	Ryoji Aikawa (相川亮二)	July 11, 1976 (aged 29)	R	R	(Japan) Yokohama BayStars
IF	1	Akinori Iwamura (岩村明憲)	February 9, 1979 (aged 27)	L	R	(Japan) Tokyo Yakult Swallows
IF	2	Michihiro Ogasawara (小笠原道大)	October 25, 1973 (aged 32)	L	R	(Japan) Hokkaido Nippon-Ham Fighters
IF	3	Nobuhiko Matsunaka (松中信彦)	December 26, 1973 (aged 32)	L	L	(Japan) Fukuoka SoftBank Hawks
IF	7	Tsuyoshi Nishioka (西岡剛)	July 27, 1984 (aged 21)	B	R	(Japan) Chiba Lotte Marines
IF	8	Toshiaki Imae (今江敏晃)	August 26, 1983 (aged 22)	R	R	(Japan) Chiba Lotte Marines
IF	10	Shinya Miyamoto (宮本慎也)	November 5, 1970 (aged 35)	R	R	(Japan) Tokyo Yakult Swallows
IF	25	Takahiro Arai (新井貴浩)	January 30, 1977 (aged 29)	R	R	(Japan) Hiroshima Toyo Carp
IF	52	Munenori Kawasaki (川崎宗則)	June 3, 1981 (aged 24)	L	R	(Japan) Fukuoka SoftBank Hawks
OF	5	Kazuhiro Wada (和田一浩)	June 19, 1972 (aged 33)	R	R	(Japan) Seibu Lions
OF	6	Hitoshi Tamura (多村仁)	May 28, 1977 (aged 28)	R	R	(Japan) Yokohama BayStars
OF	9	Tatsuhiko Kinjō (金城龍彦)	July 27, 1976 (aged 29)	B	R	(Japan) Yokohama BayStars
OF	17	Kosuke Fukudome (福留孝介)	April 26, 1977 (aged 28)	L	R	(Japan) Chunichi Dragons
OF	23	Nori Aoki (青木宣親)	January 5, 1982 (aged 24)	L	R	(Japan) Tokyo Yakult Swallows
OF	51	Ichiro Suzuki (鈴木一朗)	October 22, 1973 (aged 32)	L	R	(United States) Seattle Mariners

=== South Korea ===
Manager: Kim In-sik (김인식)
Coaches: 70 — Kim Jae-bak (hitting coach), 90 — Sun Dong-yol (pitching coach), 80 — Cho Bum-hyun (battery coach), 75 — Ryu Joong-il (defensive coach), 76 — Ryu Ji-hyun (base coach)

Pos.	No.	Player	Date of birth (age)	Bats	Throws	Club
P	36	Bae Young-soo (배영수)	May 4, 1981 (aged 24)			(South Korea) Samsung Lions
P	45	Bong Jung-keun (봉중근)	July 15, 1980 (aged 25)			(United States) Cincinnati Reds
P	21	Chong Tae-hyon (정대현)	November 10, 1978 (aged 27)			(South Korea) SK Wyverns
P	41	Chung Jae-hun (정재훈)	January 1, 1980 (aged 26)			(South Korea) Doosan Bears
P	28	Jun Byung-doo (전병두)	October 14, 1984 (aged 21)			(South Korea) KIA Tigers
P	49	Kim Byung-hyun (김병현)	January 19, 1979 (aged 27)			(United States) Colorado Rockies
P	51	Sunny Kim (김선우)	September 4, 1977 (aged 28)			(United States) Colorado Rockies
P	15	Koo Dae-sung (구대성)	August 2, 1969 (aged 36)			(United States) New York Mets
P	17	Oh Seung-hwan (오승환)	July 15, 1982 (aged 23)			(South Korea) Samsung Lions
P	61	Park Chan-ho (박찬호)	June 30, 1973 (aged 32)			(United States) San Diego Padres
P	26	Seo Jae-weong (서재응)	May 24, 1977 (aged 28)			(United States) Los Angeles Dodgers
P	1	Son Min-han (손민한)	January 2, 1975 (aged 31)			(South Korea) Lotte Giants
C	44	Cho In-sung (조인성)	May 25, 1975 (aged 30)			(South Korea) LG Twins
C	22	Hong Sung-heon (홍성흔)	February 28, 1977 (aged 29)			(South Korea) Doosan Bears
C	20	Jin Kab-yong (진갑용)	May 8, 1974 (aged 31)			(South Korea) Samsung Lions
IF	11	Choi Hee-seop (최희섭)	March 16, 1979 (aged 26)			(United States) Los Angeles Dodgers
IF	18	Kim Dong-joo (김동주)	February 3, 1976 (aged 30)			(South Korea) Doosan Bears
IF	6	Kim Jae-gul (김재걸)	September 7, 1972 (aged 33)			(South Korea) Samsung Lions
IF	16	Kim Jong-kook (김종국)	September 14, 1973 (aged 32)			(South Korea) KIA Tigers
IF	14	Kim Min-jae (김민재)	January 3, 1973 (aged 33)			(South Korea) Hanwha Eagles
IF	52	Kim Tae-kyun (김태균)	May 29, 1982 (aged 23)			(South Korea) Hanwha Eagles
IF	25	Lee Seung-yeop (이승엽)	August 18, 1976 (aged 29)			(Japan) Yomiuri Giants
IF	3	Park Jin-man (박진만)	November 30, 1976 (aged 29)			(South Korea) Samsung Lions
OF	9	Lee Byung-Kyu (이병규)	October 25, 1974 (aged 31)			(South Korea) LG Twins
OF	35	Lee Jin-young (이진영)	June 15, 1980 (aged 25)			(South Korea) SK Wyverns
OF	7	Lee Jong-beom (이종범)	August 15, 1970 (aged 35)			(South Korea) KIA Tigers
OF	33	Park Yong-taik (박용택)	April 21, 1979 (aged 26)			(South Korea) LG Twins
OF	12	Song Ji-man (송지만)	March 2, 1973 (aged 33)			(South Korea) Hyundai Unicorns

== Pool B ==
=== Canada ===
Manager: Ernie Whitt (First base coach with the Toronto Blue Jays)

Coaches: Denis Boucher (Pitching Coach), (United States) Tim Leiper (Coach), Rob Ducey (Coach), Larry Walker (Coach), Tommy Craig (Trainer)

Pos.	No.	Player	Date of birth (age)	Bats	Throws	Club
P	49	Érik Bédard	March 5, 1979 (aged 26)			(United States) Baltimore Orioles
P	35	Chris Begg	September 12, 1979 (aged 26)			(United States) Fresno Grizzlies
P	37	Rhéal Cormier	April 23, 1967 (aged 38)			(United States) Philadelphia Phillies
P	28	Jesse Crain	July 5, 1981 (aged 24)			(United States) Minnesota Twins
P	22	Éric Cyr	February 11, 1979 (aged 27)			(Taiwan) Uni-President Lions
P	26	Jeff Francis	January 8, 1981 (aged 25)			(United States) Colorado Rockies
P	24	Steve Green	January 26, 1978 (aged 28)			(United States) Toledo Mud Hens
P	20	Adam Loewen	April 9, 1984 (aged 21)			(United States) Bowie Baysox
P	36	Scott Mathieson	February 27, 1984 (aged 22)			(United States) Philadelphia Phillies
P	15	Mike Meyers	October 18, 1977 (aged 28)			(United States) Huntsville Stars
P	31	Aaron Myette	September 26, 1977 (aged 28)			(United States) York Revolution
P	32	Vince Perkins	September 27, 1981 (aged 24)			(United States) Camden Riversharks
P	48	Paul Quantrill	November 3, 1968 (aged 37)			(United States) Florida Marlins
P	34	Chris Reitsma	December 31, 1977 (aged 28)			(United States) Seattle Mariners
C	39	Pete Laforest	January 27, 1978 (aged 28)			(Mexico) Mexicali Eagles
C	8	Chris Robinson	May 12, 1984 (aged 21)			(United States) Detroit Tigers
C	17	Maxim St. Pierre	April 17, 1980 (aged 25)			(United States) Detroit Tigers
IF	11	Stubby Clapp	February 24, 1973 (aged 33)			(Canada) Edmonton Cracker-Cats
IF	47	Corey Koskie	June 28, 1973 (aged 32)			(United States) Milwaukee Brewers
IF	27	Justin Morneau	May 15, 1981 (aged 24)			(United States) Minnesota Twins
IF	16	Kevin Nicholson	March 29, 1976 (aged 29)			(United States) Somerset Patriots
IF	4	Pete Orr	June 8, 1979 (aged 26)			(United States) Atlanta Braves
IF	3	Matt Rogelstad	September 13, 1982 (aged 23)			(United States) Seattle Mariners
IF	50	Scott Thorman	January 6, 1982 (aged 24)			(United States) Richmond Braves
OF	38	Jason Bay	September 20, 1978 (aged 27)			(United States) Pittsburgh Pirates
OF	18	Sebastien Boucher	October 19, 1981 (aged 24)			(United States) Norfolk Tides
OF	45	Aaron Guiel	October 5, 1972 (aged 33)			(United States) Kansas City Royals
OF	19	Ryan Radmanovich	August 9, 1971 (aged 34)			(United States) Somerset Patriots
OF	12	Matt Stairs	February 27, 1968 (aged 38)			(United States) Kansas City Royals
OF	7	Adam Stern	February 12, 1980 (aged 26)			(United States) Boston Red Sox

=== Mexico ===
Manager: Francisco Estrada

Pitching coaches: Fernando Valenzuela, Ted Higuera

Pos.	No.	Player	Date of birth (age)	Bats	Throws	Club
P	56	Luis Ayala	January 12, 1978 (aged 28)	R	R	(United States) Washington Nationals
P	48	Francisco Campos	August 12, 1972 (aged 33)	R	R	(Mexico) Campeche Pirates
P	51	David Cortés	October 15, 1973 (aged 32)	R	R	(United States) Colorado Rockies
P	47	Jorge de la Rosa	April 5, 1981 (aged 24)	L	L	(United States) Kansas City Royals
P	45	Elmer Dessens	January 13, 1971 (aged 35)	R	R	(United States) Kansas City Royals
P	54	Édgar González	February 23, 1983 (aged 23)	R	R	(United States) Arizona Diamondbacks
P	21	Esteban Loaiza	December 31, 1971 (aged 34)	R	R	(United States) Oakland Athletics
P	13	Rodrigo López	December 14, 1975 (aged 30)	R	R	(United States) Baltimore Orioles
P	33	Pablo Ortega	November 7, 1976 (aged 29)	B	R	Mexico Tigres
P	50	Antonio Osuna	April 12, 1973 (aged 32)	R	R	Mexico Tigres
P	59	Óliver Pérez	August 15, 1981 (aged 24)	L	L	(United States) Pittsburgh Pirates
P	46	Roberto Ramírez	August 17, 1972 (aged 33)	L	L	(Mexico) Diablos Rojos del México
P	52	Dennys Reyes	April 19, 1977 (aged 28)	R	L	(United States) Minnesota Twins
P	73	Ricardo Rincón	April 13, 1970 (aged 35)	L	L	(United States) St. Louis Cardinals
P	57	Oscar Villareal	November 22, 1981 (aged 24)	L	R	(United States) Houston Astros
C	24	Adan Muñoz	March 9, 1978 (aged 27)	L	R	Mexico Tigres
C	29	Gerónimo Gil	August 7, 1975 (aged 30)	R	R	(Canada) Ottawa Lynx
C	20	Miguel Ojeda	January 29, 1975 (aged 31)	R	R	(United States) Colorado Rockies
IF	8	Alfredo Amézaga	January 16, 1978 (aged 28)	B	R	(United States) Florida Marlins
IF	3	Jorge Cantú	January 30, 1982 (aged 24)	R	R	(United States) Florida Marlins
IF	9	Vinny Castilla (C)	July 4, 1967 (aged 38)	R	R	(United States) San Diego Padres
IF	17	Juan Castro	June 20, 1972 (aged 33)	R	R	(United States) Minnesota Twins
IF	26	Luis Cruz	February 10, 1984 (aged 22)	R	R	(United States) Mobile BayBears
IF	44	Erubiel Durazo	January 23, 1974 (aged 32)	L	L	(United States) Texas Rangers
IF	22	Benji Gil	October 6, 1972 (aged 33)	R	R	(United States) Kansas City Royals
IF	23	Adrián González	May 8, 1982 (aged 23)	L	L	(United States) San Diego Padres
OF	28	Karim García	October 29, 1975 (aged 30)	L	L	(Mexico) Sultanes de Monterrey
OF	36	Luis A. García	November 5, 1978 (aged 27)	R	R	(United States) New York Yankees
OF	18	Luis C. García	September 22, 1975 (aged 30)	B	R	Mexico Tigres
OF	7	Mario Valenzuela	March 10, 1977 (aged 28)	R	R	(Mexico) Saraperos de Saltillo

=== South Africa ===
Manager: (United States) Rick Magnante

Pitching coach: (United States) Lee Smith

Pos.	No.	Player	Date of birth (age)	Bats	Throws	Club
P	35	Barry Armitage	May 11, 1979			(United States) Kansas City Royals
P	28	Tyrone Brandt	April 3, 1985			
P	37	Matthew Dancer				
P	20	Kalin Dreyer				
P	7	Shannon Ekermans				(United States) North Dakota State University
P	10	Jared Elario				
P	45	Lester Fortiun				
P	76	Gavin Jefferies				
P	44	Tyrone Lamont	April 3, 1985			(United States) AZL Mariners
P	22	Gary Maree				
P	27	Carl Michaels	May 21, 1981			(South Africa) Athlone Athletics
P	25	Darryn Smith				
P	3	Robert Verschuren	May 31, 1984			
C	18	Kyle Botha				(South Africa) Bothasig
C	15	Bradley Erasmus				
C	9	Warren Herman				(South Africa) Athlone Athletics
C	31	Willem Kemp				
IF		Tebi Andrew				
IF	12	Paul Bell	June 24, 1980			
IF	29	Nicholas Dempsey	December 15, 1978			
IF	6	Dylan Haynes				
IF	11	Zaid Hendricks				
IF	14	Patrick Naude				
IF	2	Jonathan Phillips	April 16, 1986			
IF	23	Brett Willemburg	July 2, 1984			(South Africa) Varsity Old Boys
OF	41	Ian Butcher				
OF	33	Jason Cook	July 8, 1975			
OF	26	Duane Feldtman				
OF	24	Gavin Ray				
OF	38	Ashley Scott				
OF	30	Ricardo Siljeur				(South Africa) Athlone Athletics

=== United States ===
Manager: Buck Martinez

Coaches: Marcel Lachemann, Davey Johnson, John McLaren, Reggie Smith

Pos.	No.	Player	Date of birth (age)	Bats	Throws	Club
P	22	Roger Clemens	August 4, 1962 (aged 43)			(United States) Houston Astros
P	32	Chad Cordero	March 18, 1982 (aged 23)			(United States) Washington Nationals
P	40	Brian Fuentes	August 9, 1975 (aged 30)			(United States) Colorado Rockies
P	59	Todd Jones	April 24, 1968 (aged 37)			(United States) Detroit Tigers
P	19	Al Leiter	October 23, 1965 (aged 40)			(United States) New York Yankees
P	54	Brad Lidge	December 23, 1976 (aged 29)			(United States) Houston Astros
P	38	Gary Majewski	February 26, 1980 (aged 26)			(United States) Washington Nationals
P	36	Joe Nathan	November 22, 1974 (aged 31)			(United States) Minnesota Twins
P	45	Jake Peavy	May 31, 1981 (aged 24)			(United States) San Diego Padres
P	62	Scot Shields	July 22, 1975 (aged 30)			(United States) Los Angeles Angels of Anaheim
P	20	Huston Street	August 2, 1983 (aged 22)			(United States) Oakland Athletics
P	50	Mike Timlin	March 10, 1966 (aged 39)			(United States) Boston Red Sox
P	39	Dan Wheeler	December 10, 1977 (aged 28)			(United States) Tampa Bay Devil Rays
P	35	Dontrelle Willis	January 12, 1982 (aged 24)			(United States) Florida Marlins
C	8	Michael Barrett	October 22, 1976 (aged 29)			(United States) Chicago Cubs
C	24	Brian Schneider	November 26, 1976 (aged 29)			(United States) Washington Nationals
C	33	Jason Varitek	April 11, 1972 (aged 33)			(United States) Boston Red Sox
IF	2	Derek Jeter	June 26, 1974 (aged 31)			(United States) New York Yankees
IF	10	Chipper Jones	April 24, 1972 (aged 33)			(United States) Atlanta Braves
IF	25	Derrek Lee	September 6, 1975 (aged 30)			(United States) Chicago Cubs
IF	13	Alex Rodríguez	July 27, 1975 (aged 30)			(United States) New York Yankees
IF	23	Mark Teixeira	April 11, 1980 (aged 25)			(United States) Texas Rangers
IF	26	Chase Utley	December 17, 1978 (aged 27)			(United States) Philadelphia Phillies
IF	1	Michael Young	October 19, 1976 (aged 29)			(United States) Texas Rangers
OF	18	Johnny Damon	November 5, 1973 (aged 32)			(United States) New York Yankees
OF	7	Jeff Francoeur	January 8, 1984 (aged 22)			(United States) Atlanta Braves
OF	3	Ken Griffey Jr.	November 21, 1969 (aged 36)			(United States) Cincinnati Reds
OF	5	Matt Holliday	January 15, 1980 (aged 26)			(United States) Colorado Rockies
OF	6	Vernon Wells	December 8, 1978 (aged 27)			(Canada) Toronto Blue Jays
OF	21	Randy Winn	June 9, 1974 (aged 31)			(United States) San Francisco Giants

== Pool C ==
=== Cuba ===
Manager: Higinio Vélez

Pos.	No.	Player	Date of birth (age)	Bats	Throws	Club
P	26	Luis Borroto	August 24, 1982 (aged 23)	Right	Right	(Cuba) Villa Clara
P	79	Maikel Folch	January 11, 1980 (aged 26)	Right	Left	(Cuba) Ciego de Ávila
P	32	Norberto González	October 10, 1979 (aged 26)	Left	Left	(Cuba) Cienfuegos
P	48	Yulieski González	June 20, 1980 (aged 25)	Left	Left	(Cuba) Habana
P	99	Pedro Luis Lazo	April 15, 1973 (aged 32)	Right	Right	(Cuba) Pinar del Río
P	90	Yadel Martí	July 22, 1979 (aged 26)	Right	Right	(Cuba) Industriales
P	58	Jonder Martínez	June 22, 1978 (aged 27)	Right	Right	(Cuba) Habana
P	97	Yunesky Maya	August 28, 1981 (aged 24)	Right	Right	(Cuba) Pinar del Río
P	23	Vicyohandri Odelín	February 26, 1980 (aged 26)	Right	Right	(Cuba) Camagüey
P	16	Adiel Palma	August 20, 1970 (aged 35)	Left	Left	(Cuba) Cienfuegos
P	62	Yadier Pedroso	April 9, 1986 (aged 19)	Right	Right	(Cuba) Habana
P	81	Yosvani Pérez	January 23, 1974 (aged 32)	Left	Left	(Cuba) Cienfuegos
P	19	Ormari Romero	February 22, 1968 (aged 38)	Right	Right	Santiago de Cuba
P	4	Deinis Suárez	March 13, 1984 (aged 21)	Right	Right	(Cuba) Industriales
C	61	Roger Machado	March 31, 1974 (aged 31)	Right	Right	(Cuba) Ciego de Ávila
C	8	Ariel Pestano	January 31, 1974 (aged 32)	Right	Right	(Cuba) Villa Clara
C	51	Eriel Sánchez	May 17, 1975 (aged 30)	Right	Right	(Cuba) Sancti Spíritus
IF	54	Leslie Anderson	March 30, 1982 (aged 23)	Left	Left	(Cuba) Camagüey
IF	53	Ariel Borrero	January 1, 1972 (aged 34)	Left	Left	(Cuba) Villa Clara
IF	12	Michel Enríquez	February 11, 1979 (aged 27)	Right	Right	(Cuba) Isla de la Juventud
IF	10	Yulieski Gurriel	June 9, 1984 (aged 21)	Right	Right	(Cuba) Sancti Spíritus
IF	42	Juan Carlos Moreno	September 28, 1975 (aged 30)	Right	Right	(Cuba) Isla de la Juventud
IF	2	Eduardo Paret	October 23, 1972 (aged 33)	Right	Right	(Cuba) Villa Clara
IF	14	Joan Carlos Pedroso	July 23, 1979 (aged 26)	Right	Right	(Cuba) Las Tunas
IF	11	Rudy Reyes	November 5, 1979 (aged 26)	Right	Right	(Cuba) Industriales
OF	24	Frederich Cepeda	April 13, 1980 (aged 25)	Switch	Right	(Cuba) Sancti Spíritus
OF	31	Yoandy Garlobo	January 12, 1977 (aged 29)	Right	Right	(Cuba) Matanzas
OF	21	Alexei Ramírez	September 22, 1981 (aged 24)	Right	Right	(Cuba) Pinar del Río
OF	56	Carlos Tabares	July 8, 1974 (aged 31)	Right	Right	(Cuba) Industriales
OF	46	Osmani Urrutia	June 29, 1976 (aged 29)	Right	Right	(Cuba) Las Tunas

=== Netherlands ===
Manager: Robert Eenhoorn

Coaches: (United States) Bob Welch (pitching coach), Hensley Meulens, (United States) Brian Farley, Jack Hubbard, Ben Thijssen, and Steve Matthew

Pos.	No.	Player	Date of birth (age)	Bats	Throws	Club
P	47	David Bergman				(Netherlands) Kinheim
P	10	Kenny Berkenbosch				(Netherlands) Pirates
P	19	Rob Cordemans				(Netherlands) ADO
P	14	Dave Draijer				(Netherlands) Pioniers
P	40	Gregory Gustina				(Netherlands) Neptunus
P	45	Jair Jurrjens				(United States) Lakeland Flying Tigers
P	16	Calvin Maduro				(Netherlands) Neptunus
P	36	Diego Markwell				(Netherlands) Neptunus
P	39	Shairon Martis				(United States) Scottsdale Giants
P	31	Alexander Smit				(United States) Fort Myers Miracle
P	34	Nick Stuifbergen				(Netherlands) Pirates
P	3	Robin van Doornspeek				(Netherlands) ADO
P	13	Michiel van Kampen				(Netherlands) Kinheim
C	15	Maikel Benner				(Netherlands) ADO
C	33	Chairon Isenia				(United States) Montgomery Biscuits
C	24	Sidney de Jong				(Netherlands) Pirates
IF	12	Sharnol Adriana				(Mexico) Tuneros de San Luis
IF	17	Ivanon Coffie				(Netherlands) Almere
IF	1	Michael Duursma				(Netherlands) Pioniers
IF	26	Percy Isenia				(Netherlands) ADO
IF	30	Raily Legito				(Netherlands) Neptunus
IF	35	Randall Simon				(Japan) Orix Buffaloes
IF	4	Hainley Statia				(United States) Orem Owlz
OF	23	Johnny Balentina				(Netherlands) Neptunus
OF	22	Yurendell DeCaster				(United States) Indianapolis Indians
OF	25	Andruw Jones				(United States) Atlanta Braves
OF	21	Eugene Kingsale				(United States) Bowie Baysox
OF	7	Harvey Monte				(Netherlands) ADO
OF	27	Danny Rombley				(Netherlands) Kinheim
OF	18	Dirk van 't Klooster				(Netherlands) Kinheim

=== Panama ===
Manager: Anibal Reluz

Pos.	No.	Player	Date of birth (age)	Bats	Throws	Club
P	23	Manny Acosta				(United States) Atlanta Braves
P	24	Albenis Castillo				
P	22	Bienvenido Cedeño				
P	27	Bruce Chen				
P	36	Manuel Corpas				(United States) Colorado Rockies
P	25	Jorge Cortéz				
P	58	Roger Deago				
P	18	Paolo Espino				
P	31	Miguel Gómez				
P	12	Santos Hernández				
P	56	Len Picota				
P	29	Ramon Ramírez				
P	33	Davis Romero				(Canada) Toronto Blue Jays
C	8	Damaso Espino				
C	16	Carlos Muñoz				
C	49	César Quintero				
C	51	Carlos Ruiz				(United States) Philadelphia Phillies
IF	7	Javier Castillo				
IF	11	Vicente Garibaldo				
IF	32	Yoni Lasso				
IF	30	Orlando Miller				
IF	15	Olmedo Sáenz				
OF	4	Earl Agnoly				
OF	26	Audes de León				
OF	17	Freddy Herrera				
OF	45	Carlos Lee				(United States) Houston Astros
OF	64	Sherman Obando				
OF	28	Adolfo Rivera				
OF	14	Rubén Rivera				
OF	1	Manuel O. Rodríguez				

=== Puerto Rico ===
Manager: José Oquendo

Pos.	No.	Player	Date of birth (age)	Bats	Throws	Club
P	9	Federico Báez				(United States) West Tenn Diamond Jaxx
P	56	Fernando Cabrera				(United States) Cleveland Indians
P	50	Kiko Calero				(United States) Oakland Athletics
P	58	Willie Collazo				(United States) Binghamton Mets
P	48	Pedro Feliciano				(United States) New York Mets
P	43	Dicky Gonzalez				(Japan) Tokyo Yakult Swallows
P	55	Iván Maldonado				(United States) Binghamton Mets
P	45	Josué Matos				(United States) Newark Bears
P	29	Juan Padilla				(United States) New York Mets
P	38	Joel Piñeiro				(United States) St. Louis Cardinals
P	57	Chris Rojas				(United States) Altoona Curve
P	52	Orlando Román				(United States) Binghamton Mets
P	33	J. C. Romero				(United States) Los Angeles Angels of Anaheim
P	40	Jose Santiago				(United States) New York Mets
P	23	Javier Vázquez				(United States) Chicago White Sox
C	8	Javy López				(United States) Baltimore Orioles
C	4	Yadier Molina				(United States) St. Louis Cardinals
C	7	Iván Rodríguez				(United States) Detroit Tigers
C	17	Javier Valentín				(United States) Cincinnati Reds
IF	12	Alex Cintrón				(United States) Chicago White Sox
IF	13	Alex Cora				(United States) Boston Red Sox
IF	25	Carlos Delgado				(United States) New York Mets
IF	6	Rubén Gotay				(United States) Kansas City Royals
IF	5	Eduardo Pérez				(United States) Cleveland Indians
IF	10	José Valentín				(United States) New York Mets
OF	15	Carlos Beltrán				(United States) New York Mets
OF	22	José Cruz Jr.				(United States) Los Angeles Dodgers
OF	24	Ricky Ledée				(United States) Los Angeles Dodgers
OF	32	Luis Matos				(United States) Baltimore Orioles
OF	19	Alex Ríos				(Canada) Toronto Blue Jays
OF	51	Bernie Williams				(United States) New York Yankees

== Pool D ==
=== Australia ===
Manager: Jon Deeble

Pos.	No.	Player	Date of birth (age)	Bats	Throws	Club
P	31	Craig Anderson	October 30, 1980			
P	21	Phil Brassington	April 19, 1970			
P	11	Adam Bright	August 11, 1984			
P	57	Adrian Burnside	March 15, 1977			
P	30	Tristan Crawford	July 22, 1982			
P	13	Matthew Gahan	November 26, 1975			
P	38	Josh Hill				
P	44	Wayne Lundgren	April 21, 1982			
P	15	Paul Mildren	May 3, 1984			
P	27	Damian Moss	November 24, 1976			
P	42	Peter Moylan	December 2, 1978			(United States) Atlanta Braves
P		Ryan Rowland-Smith	January 26, 1983			
P	24	John Stephens	November 15, 1979			(Canada) Ottawa Lynx
P	39	Phil Stockman	January 25, 1980			(United States) Atlanta Braves
P	19	Rich Thompson	July 1, 1984			(United States) Los Angeles Angels of Anaheim
C	48	Michael Collins	July 18, 1984			
C	47	Andrew Graham	April 22, 1982			(United States) Detroit Tigers
C	35	Matthew Kent	July 2, 1980			
IF	7	Trent Durrington	August 27, 1975			
IF	4	Gavin Fingleson				
IF	29	Bradley Harman	November 19, 1985			
IF	26	Justin Huber	July 1, 1982			
IF	16	Luke Hughes	August 2, 1984			
IF	22	Brendan Kingman	May 22, 1973			
IF	14	Dave Nilsson	December 14, 1969			
IF	6	Rodney van Buizen				
IF	18	Glenn Williams				
OF	25	Tom Brice	August 24, 1981			
OF	8	Trent Oeltjen	February 28, 1983			
OF	17	Brett Roneberg	May 2, 1979			
OF	23	Paul Rutgers	January 17, 1984			

=== Dominican Republic ===
Manager: Manny Acta

Pos.	No.	Player	Date of birth (age)	Bats	Throws	Club
IF	2	Plácido Polanco	October 10, 1975 (aged 30)			(United States) Detroit Tigers
IF	4	Willy Taveras	December 25, 1981 (aged 24)			(United States) Colorado Rockies
IF	5	Albert Pujols	January 16, 1980 (aged 26)			(United States) St. Louis Cardinals
IF	7	Pedro Feliz	April 27, 1975 (aged 30)			(United States) Philadelphia Phillies
IF	9	José Reyes	June 11, 1983 (aged 22)			(United States) New York Mets
IF	10	Miguel Tejada	May 25, 1974 (aged 31)			(United States) Houston Astros
IF	12	Alfonso Soriano	January 7, 1976 (aged 30)			(United States) Chicago Cubs
C	15	Juan Brito	November 7, 1979 (aged 26)			(United States) Arizona Diamondbacks
P	15	Salomón Torres	March 11, 1972 (aged 33)			(United States) Pittsburgh Pirates
OF	18	Moisés Alou	July 3, 1966 (aged 39)			(United States) New York Mets
OF	19	Juan Encarnación	March 8, 1976 (aged 29)			(United States) St. Louis Cardinals
IF	20	Ronnie Belliard	April 7, 1975 (aged 30)			(United States) Washington Nationals
C	22	Alberto Castillo	February 10, 1970 (aged 36)			(United States) Washington Nationals
IF	25	Michael Santiago-Smith	August 17, 1972 (aged 33)			(United States) Minnesota Twins
OF	26	Wily Mo Peña	January 23, 1982 (aged 24)			(United States) Washington Nationals
OF	27	Vladimir Guerrero	February 9, 1975 (aged 31)			(United States) Los Angeles Angels of Anaheim
IF	29	Adrián Beltré	April 7, 1979 (aged 26)			(United States) Seattle Mariners
C	31	Ronny Paulino	April 21, 1981 (aged 24)			(United States) Pittsburgh Pirates
P	33	Jorge Sosa	April 28, 1977 (aged 28)			(United States) New York Mets
IF	34	David Ortiz	November 18, 1975 (aged 30)			(United States) Boston Red Sox
P	35	Daniel Cabrera	May 28, 1981 (aged 24)			(United States) Baltimore Orioles
P	38	Dámaso Marte	February 14, 1975 (aged 31)			(United States) New York Yankees
P	40	Bartolo Colón	May 24, 1973 (aged 32)			(United States) Los Angeles Angels of Anaheim
P	41	Francisco Liriano	October 26, 1983 (aged 22)			(United States) Minnesota Twins
P	43	Miguel Batista	February 19, 1971 (aged 35)			(United States) Arizona Diamondbacks
P	47	Robinson Tejeda	March 24, 1982 (aged 23)			(United States) Philadelphia Phillies
P	51	Eude Brito	August 19, 1978 (aged 27)			(United States) Philadelphia Phillies
P	52	Duaner Sánchez	October 14, 1979 (aged 26)			(United States) New York Mets
P	53	Julián Tavárez	May 22, 1973 (aged 32)			(United States) Atlanta Braves
P	55	Odális Pérez	June 7, 1977 (aged 28)			(United States) Los Angeles Dodgers
P	56	Fernando Rodney	March 18, 1977 (aged 28)			(United States) Detroit Tigers

=== Italy ===
Manager: (United States) Matt Galante

Pos.	No.	Player	Date of birth (age)	Bats	Throws	Club
P	53	Phil Barzilla	January 25, 1979			(United States) Round Rock Express
P	43	Riccardo De Santis	January 4, 1980			(Italy) Prink Grosseto
P	55	Lenny DiNardo	September 19, 1979			(United States) Oakland Athletics
P	22	Tony Fiore	October 12, 1971			(United States) Toledo Mud Hens
P	45	Mike Gallo	April 2, 1977			(United States) Houston Astros
P	49	Jason Grilli	November 11, 1976			(United States) Detroit Tigers
P	38	Todd Incantalupo	May 18, 1976			(Italy) Italeri Bologna
P	36	Marc LaMacchia	March 27, 1982			(United States) Bakersfield Blaze
P	17	Alex Maestri	June 1, 1985			(United States) Boise Hawks
P	13	John Mangieri	September 24, 1976			T&A San Marino
P	58	Dan Miceli	September 9, 1970			(United States) Tampa Bay Devil Rays
P	28	Fabio Milano	August 2, 1977			(Italy) Italeri Bologna
P	40	Kasey Olenberger	March 18, 1978			(United States) Salt Lake Bees
P	37	David Rollandini	February 6, 1979			(Italy) Prink Grosseto
C	14	Matt Ceriani	October 9, 1976			(Italy) Caffè Danesi Nettuno
C	20	Thomas Gregorio	May 5, 1977			(United States) San Antonio Missions
C	31	Mike Piazza	September 4, 1968			(United States) San Diego Padres
IF	34	Davide Dallospedale	September 12, 1977			(Italy) Italeri Bologna
IF	6	Tony Giarratano	November 29, 1982			(United States) Erie SeaWolves
IF	42	Claudio Liverziani	March 4, 1975			(Italy) Italeri Bologna
IF	4	Frank Menechino	January 7, 1971			(United States) Louisville Bats
IF	26	Jairo Ramos Gizzi	July 21, 1971			(Italy) Prink Grosseto
IF	18	Mark Saccomanno	April 30, 1980			(United States) Corpus Christi Hooks
IF	1	Jack Santora	October 6, 1976			(United States) Newark Bears
IF	15	Vince Sinisi	November 7, 1981			(United States) Frisco RoughRiders
OF	3	James Buccheri	November 12, 1968			(Italy) Telemarket Rimini
OF	27	Frank Catalanotto	April 27, 1974			(Canada) Toronto Blue Jays
OF	24	Dustin Delucchi	December 23, 1977			(United States) Mobile BayBears
OF	35	Val Pascucci	November 17, 1978			(Japan) Chiba Lotte Marines
OF	25	Peter Zoccolillo	February 2, 1977			

=== Venezuela ===
Manager: Luis Sojo

Coaches: Dave Concepción, Oscar Escobar, Roberto Espinoza, Omar Malavé, Luis Salazar

Pos.	No.	Player	Date of birth (age)	Bats	Throws	Club
IF	1	Tomás Pérez	December 29, 1973 (aged 32)			(United States) Chicago White Sox
IF	2	Carlos Guillén	September 30, 1975 (aged 30)			(United States) Detroit Tigers
IF	9	Edgardo Alfonzo	November 8, 1973 (aged 32)			
IF	12	Marco Scutaro	October 30, 1975 (aged 30)			(United States) Oakland Athletics
IF	13	Omar Vizquel (captain)	April 24, 1967 (aged 38)			(United States) San Francisco Giants
P	15	Víctor Moreno	June 10, 1979 (aged 26)			
C	19	Ramón Hernández	May 20, 1976 (aged 29)			(United States) Baltimore Orioles
OF	20	Juan Rivera	July 3, 1978 (aged 27)			(United States) Los Angeles Angels of Anaheim
C	21	Henry Blanco	August 29, 1971 (aged 34)			(United States) Chicago Cubs
P	23	Ricardo Palma	September 26, 1979 (aged 26)			
IF	24	Miguel Cabrera	April 18, 1983 (aged 22)			(United States) Florida Marlins
P	27	Carlos E. Hernández	April 22, 1980 (aged 25)			(United States) Houston Astros
P	28	Giovanni Carrara	March 4, 1968 (aged 37)			(United States) Pittsburgh Pirates
P	29	Jorge Julio	March 3, 1979 (aged 27)			(United States) New York Mets
OF	30	Magglio Ordóñez	January 28, 1974 (aged 32)			(United States) Detroit Tigers
P	31	Víctor Zambrano	August 6, 1975 (aged 30)			(United States) New York Mets
P	34	Freddy García	June 10, 1976 (aged 29)			(United States) Detroit Tigers
P	36	Tony Armas Jr.	April 29, 1978 (aged 27)			(United States) New York Mets
P	37	Francisco Rodríguez	January 7, 1982 (aged 24)			(United States) Los Angeles Angels of Anaheim
P	38	Carlos Zambrano	June 1, 1981 (aged 24)			(United States) Chicago Cubs
P	39	Gustavo Chacín	December 4, 1980 (aged 25)			(Canada) Toronto Blue Jays
C	41	Víctor Martínez	December 23, 1978 (aged 27)			(United States) Cleveland Indians
P	45	Kelvim Escobar	April 11, 1976 (aged 29)			(United States) Los Angeles Angels of Anaheim
OF	47	Endy Chávez	February 7, 1978 (aged 28)			(United States) New York Mets
OF	51	Robert Pérez	June 4, 1969 (aged 36)			
P	52	Carlos Silva	April 23, 1979 (aged 26)			(United States) Seattle Mariners
OF	53	Bobby Abreu	March 11, 1974 (aged 31)			(United States) New York Yankees
OF	56	Tony Álvarez	May 10, 1979 (aged 26)			
P	57	Johan Santana	March 13, 1979 (aged 26)			(United States) New York Mets
P	63	Rafael Betancourt	April 29, 1975 (aged 30)			(United States) Cleveland Indians

== Notes and references ==
- Rosters: China, Chinese Taipei, Japan, Korea, Canada, Mexico, South Africa, USA, Cuba, Netherlands, Panama, Puerto Rico, Australia, Dominican Republic, Italy, Venezuela

Preceded by N/A	World Baseball Classic rosters	Succeeded by 2009
