= List of faculty and alumni of St. Francis College =

This page lists notable persons with ties to St. Francis College.

== Alumni and former students ==
=== Academics ===
- Brendan J. Dugan, '68, former regional chairman and CEO of Sovereign Bank and 18th President of St. Francis College
- Donald A. McQuade, PhD, '63, former vice chancellor for university relations at the University of California, Berkeley
- Frank J. Macchiarola, LL.B., PhD, '62, former president of St. Francis College (1996–2008), chairman of the New York State Higher Education Services Commission, chancellor of St. Francis College
- John J. McDermott, PhD, '53, philosopher and distinguished professor at Texas A&M University

=== Architecture ===
- Joseph Hubert McGuire, 1887, American architect practicing in New York City, where he specialized in Catholic churches and institutions.
- Joseph A. Jackson, American architect who designed many buildings for Roman Catholic clients in the Eastern United States

=== Arts and literature ===
- Jim Brochu, '69, actor and playwright
- Joseph Skerrett, PhD, '64, American literary critic and professor of English at the University of Massachusetts Amherst.
- Jim Luisi, '51, Emmy award winning actor

=== Business and finance ===
- Thomas F. Woodlock, 1905, editor of the Wall Street Journal and US Interstate Commerce Commission commissioner.

=== Government and politics ===
- Eric A. Ulrich, '07, New York City Councilman, 32nd District
- Ronald Castorina, J.D., '01, assembly member for the 62nd District of the New York State Assembly
- Dick Stevenson, M.B.A., '73, member of the Pennsylvania House of Representatives, the 8th District
- Thomas J. Pickard, M.B.A./C.P.A., '72, former Director of the Federal Bureau of Investigation
- Thomas Von Essen, '72, 30th FDNY Commissioner of the City of New York
- Richard Sheirer, '67, director of the New York City Office of Emergency Management (O.E.M.) during the 11 September attacks.
- Peter T. King, J.D., '65, U.S. Representative, New York's 3rd congressional district
- Thomas J. Cuite, '35, former New York State Senator and majority leader of the New York City Council
- John J. Bennett Jr., 56th New York State Attorney General
- Joseph L. Pfeifer, M.D., U.S. Representative, New York's 3rd and 8th congressional districts
- Thomas H. Cullen, 1880, U.S. Representative, New York's 4th congressional district

=== Law ===
- Margo Kitsy Brodie, J.D., '88, federal judge for the United States District Court for the Eastern District of New York.
- Frank Altimari, J.D., '48, Senior Federal Appeals Judge, Second Circuit Court of Appeals
- John Francis Dooling Jr., LL.B., '29, federal judge for the United States District Court for the Eastern District of New York
- Walter F. Timpone, Associate Justice of the Supreme Court of New Jersey

=== Military ===
- Timothy F. O'Keefe, '40, former General in the United States Air Force, who served in World War II, the Korean War and the Vietnam War and was the recipient of numerous medals and honors.

=== Other ===
- Pete Davidson, comedian and former cast member of Saturday Night Live.
- Hector Batista, '84, CEO of Big Brothers Big Sisters of NYC.

=== Religion ===
- Thomas Edmund Molloy, 1904, Bishop of Brooklyn from 1921 to 1956.

=== Science and technology ===
- Donald J. Metz, PhD, '47, nuclear engineer at Brookhaven National Laboratory and professor at St. Francis College

=== Sports ===
- Ian Roberts, runner for Guyana in the 2000 Olympics
- John Mangieri, '97, Pitcher drafted by the New York Mets, member of the Italian World Baseball Classic Team
- John Halama, '94, Major League Baseball Pitcher
- Barry Rohrssen, '83, former basketball head coach of the Manhattan College Jaspers
- Joseph Browne, '68, Executive Vice President Communications and Public Affairs, NFL
- Mark Turenshine, '66, American-Israeli basketball player
- Dick Bavetta, '62, NBA referee

== Faculty and staff ==
- Dinesh Sharma, senior fellow at the Institute for International and Cross-Cultural Research.
- Nelson Barbosa, former professor at St. Francis College, current Brazil's Minister of Finance.
- Joseph Brennan, former men's basketball head coach and member of the Basketball Hall of Fame, class of '75.
- Peter Kavanagh, (19 March 1916-January 27, 2006) writer, scholar, and publisher
- Ed Setrakian, professor emeritus at St. Francis College, playwright, director and actor. Played Al Hyman, in the film "Zodiac."
- John Sexton, former chair of the Religion Department, the fifteenth president of New York University
- Sue Wicks, former assistant head coach for the Lady Terriers Basketball team and former WNBA player.
- Rich Zvosec, former men's basketball head coach and ESPN commentator.
