= Ceriani (surname) =

Ceriani is an Italian surname. Notable people with the surname include:

- Antonio Maria Ceriani (1828–1907), Italian prelate, Syriacist, and scholar
- Dylann Ceriani, American former volleyball player
- María Fernanda Ceriani (born 1966), Argentine biologist
- Matt Ceriani (born 1981), Italian baseball player
- Warly Ceriani (1903–1983), classic Argentine actor
