= Guo Tao =

Guo Tao may refer to:

- Guo Tao (general) (郭涛; Guō Tāo; 1926−2011), Chinese general
- Guo Tao (actor) (郭涛; Guō Tāo; born 1969), Chinese actor
- Guo Tao (baseball) (国涛; Guó Tāo; born 1987), Chinese baseball player
