= Audes de León =

Panamanian baseball player

Medal record

Men's baseball

Representing Panama

Baseball World Cup
Silver medal – second place	2003 Cuba	Team
Bronze medal – third place	2005 Netherlands	Team

Audes Leopoldo de Leon Flores (born June 26, 1979 in Chitré, Panama) is a Panamanian baseball player who played in multiple international events, including the 2006 World Baseball Classic and the 2009 World Baseball Classic.

He played professionally for the Dominican Summer League Giants in the San Francisco Giants system in 1997, hitting .411.

In 2003, he played in the Baseball World Cup, hitting .356 with five home runs, 10 runs scored and 16 RBI in 10 games. He hit .368 with nine runs and eight RBI in 11 games in the 2005 Baseball World Cup. In the 2006 World Baseball Classic, he went only 1-for-6 at the plate.

He hit .333 in the 2006 COPABE qualifier for the 2008 Olympics, however Panama did not make the cut. During the 2006 Central American and Caribbean Games, he hit .278 and led Panama with three runs in five games.

In 10 at-bats during the 2007 Pan American Games, de Leon hit .600. He hit .375 in the 2007 Baseball World Cup, and in the 2008 Americas Baseball Cup he hit only .126. He had one at-bat in the 2009 World Baseball Classic. He did not collect a hit.

De Leon has become a manager for Panamanian youth baseball teams.
