= Dönmez =

Dönmez is a Turkish surname, it may refer to:

- Ecem Dönmez (born 1998), Turkish female swimmer
- Karsu Dönmez (born 1990), Amsterdam-born singer, pianist and composer
- Pınar Dönmez (born 2007), Turkish female swimmer
- Şebnem Dönmez (born 1974), Turkish actress in movies and television series

== See also ==
- Don Metz (disambiguation)
