= Earl Agnoly =

Panamanian baseball player (born 1975)

Medal record

Representing Panama

Men's Baseball

Baseball World Cup
Bronze medal – third place	2005 Rotterdam	Team

Earl Rene Agnoly Thompson (born November 18, 1975, in Colón, Panama) is a former professional baseball player. He played professionally for six years in the Florida Marlins organization and in independent baseball. As a member of the Panama national baseball team, he was on Panama's roster in the 2006 World Baseball Classic and 2009 World Baseball Classic.

He played in the Dominican Summer League in 1993 and 1994, hitting .321 in 1993 and .336 in 1994. With the GCL Marlins in 1995, he hit .272 in 55 games. In 1996 and 1997, he played for the Kane County Cougars, hitting .246 in the former year and only .210 in the latter year.

In the 1998 Baseball World Cup qualifier, he hit .500, and in the actual World Baseball Cup he hit .448. He had 12 RBI in the 1998 Central American and Caribbean Games.

Although he hit only .206 in the 2001 Baseball World Cup, he hit .370 in the 2002 Intercontinental Cup. In April, 2003, it was found out that he had been doping, and he was subsequently banned from international competition for two years.

He returned to professional baseball in 2003, appearing in 13 games for the Calgary Outlaws of the Canadian Baseball League and hitting .300 with three stolen bases.

In the 2005 Baseball World Cup, he hit .324 and scored eight runs. He went 1-for-3 in the 2006 World Baseball Classic. In the 2008 Olympics qualifier (held in 2006), he hit .471 with 11 runs, although his team did not make the cut in the end. He hit .261 in the 2006 Central American and Caribbean Games.

Agnoly hit .231 in the 2007 Pan-American Games, and he hit only .150 in the 2007 Baseball World Cup. In the 2008 Americas Baseball Cup, he hit .273. In one at-bat in the 2009 World Baseball Classic, he struck out.
