= Miguel Gómez (pitcher, born 1974) =

Panamanian baseball player (born 1974)

- Pitcher
- Born: May 31, 1974; Panama City, Panama
- Batted: Right Threw: Right

CPBL debut
- July 8, 2003, for the Brother Elephants

Last CPBL appearance
- 2004, for the Brother Elephants

CPBL statistics
- Win–loss record: 7–6
- Earned run average: 3.06
- Strikeouts: 77

Teams
- Brother Elephants (2003–2004)
Medals
Men's baseball
Representing Panama
Baseball World Cup
Bronze medal – third place	2005 Netherlands	Team

Miguel Ángel Gómez Martínez (born May 31, 1974) is a Panamanian former professional baseball pitcher. He played in the Chinese Professional Baseball League (CPBL) for the Brother Elephants. He was a mainstay on the Panama national baseball team in the early 21st century. He was on Panama's roster in the 2006 World Baseball Classic.

== Career ==
=== Amateur career ===
Gómez started his amateur career in Panama Metro youth system, later signed in 1992 by Toronto Blue Jays organization. Since 2009 plays for Bocas del Toro baseball team aka Turtle-men on the Panama National Baseball Championship, achieving four straight finals with them. In 2009 and 2010 as the number one starter of the team, since 2011 as main closer.

On Game 7 of the 2012 season, saved the game for Bocas del Toro, to win their first national title in 51 years on a dramatic 5:50 hours game.

In the 2013 Finals, on Game 6 was brought as emergency starter and shutout Chiriqui for 6.2 innings, the game finished 1–0, and could be his best career performance.

=== Minor Leagues ===
He started his professional career in 1992 with the DSL Blue Jays, going 2–8 with a 7.33 ERA. In 1993, he went 3–0 with a 3.77 ERA for the DSL Blue Jays East, In 1994 injured, then he went 2–0 with a 1.23 ERA for the DSL Blue Jays in 1995. In 1996, he pitched for the Dunedin Blue Jays, going 5–4 with five saves and a 3.38 ERA in 33 games in relief. He pitched for Dunedin and the Hagerstown Suns in 1997, going 4–3 with a 4.93 ERA for the former and 1–1 with an 8.04 ERA for the latter. 1997 was his final season in minor league baseball - overall, he posted a 20–21 record in the minors.

=== Other Leagues ===
Played for the Carta Vieja Ronners of Probeis in the winter of 2001–2002, going 5–0 with a 1.12 ERA. From 2002 to 2003 played for Mexico City Tigers of the Liga Mexicana de Béisbol.

In 2003, Gómez pitched for the Brother Elephants in Taiwan, going 4–3 with a 1.69 ERA. He went 3–3 with a 4.68 ERA with them in 2004, and was released after the season.

== International career ==
During the 2001 Baseball World Cup, he went 2–0 with two saves and a 1.23 ERA. In the 2002 Intercontinental Cup, Gómez went 0–1, allowing six earned runs in 2 2/3 innings of work.

Gómez pitched in the 2005 Baseball World Cup, going 2–0 with three saves and 0.49 ERA. During the 2006 World Baseball Classic, he posted an atrocious 45.00 ERA. In the 2007 Pan-American Games, Gómez allowed one run in 11 1/3 innings of work. He pitched in the 2008 Americas Baseball Cup, going 1–0 with a 4.26 ERA.
