= Don Metz =

Don Metz may refer to:

- Don Metz (ice hockey) (1916–2007), ice hockey right winger
- Donald J. Metz (1924–1999), nuclear engineer
