= Vicente Garibaldo =

Panamanian baseball player

Cristóbal Vicente Garibaldo (born March 14, 1969, in Chepo, Panama) is a former baseball player. He played for Panama in the 2006 World Baseball Classic. He appeared in two games, collecting zero hits in one at-bat. He is right-handed, 5'11" tall and weighs 195 pounds. His name has also been spelled Christobal and he has also been known as Chris Garibaldo.

He played professionally from 1988 to 1990 in the Kansas City Royals farm system. Prior to playing professionally, he attended Lewis Martin High School in Chepo. He played for the Gulf Coast League Royals in 1988, hitting .228 in 123 at-bats. With the Appleton Foxes in 1989, he hit .214 in 388 at-bats. He played for Appleton and the Baseball City Royals in 1990, hitting .125 in 16 at-bats for the former and .205 in 303 at-bats for the latter. Overall, he hit .211 in 830 professional at-bats.

In the 2003 Baseball World Cup, he hit .194. Playing for Panama in the 2005 Baseball World Cup, he fielded .878 with six errors in 11 games, and he hit .143.
