= Freddy Herrera =

Panamanian baseball player

Medal record

Men's baseball

Representing Panama

Baseball World Cup
Bronze medal – third place	2005 Netherlands	Team

Freddy Eladio Herrera Cheng (born December 17, 1973) is a baseball outfielder. He played on the Panama national baseball team and appeared in the 2006 World Baseball Classic.

In the 1999 Pan American Games, he hit a two-run home run, but that wasn't enough to overcome Team USA. He hit .387 with seven doubles in the 2001 Baseball World Cup, and in the 2002 Intercontinental Cup he hit .324. In the 2005 Baseball World Cup, Herrera hit .389 with 10 runs and 10 RBI in 11 games.

Herrera had only one hit in seven at-bats in the 2006 World Baseball Classic. He had three hits in 17 at-bats in the 2006 Central American and Caribbean Games and in the 2006 Pan American Baseball Confederation qualifier for the 2008 Olympics he hit only .219.

In the 2007 Pan American Games, Herrera had three hits in 11 at-bats, and he had three hits in nine at-bats in the 2007 Baseball World Cup. In the 2008 Americas Baseball Cup, he hit .160.
