= Kim Min-jae (baseball) =

South Korean baseball player (1973–2026)

- Shortstop
- Born: January 3, 1973
- Died: January 14, 2026 (aged 53)
- Batted: Right Threw: Right

KBO debut
- August 18, 1991, for the Lotte Giants

Last KBO appearance
- September 25, 2009, for the Hanwha Eagles

KBO statistics
- Batting average: .247
- Hits: 1,503
- Home runs: 71
- Runs batted in: 607
- Stats at Baseball Reference

Teams
- As player: Lotte Giants (1991–2001); SK Wyverns (2002–2005); Hanwha Eagles (2006–2009); As coach: Hanwha Eagles (2009–2012); Doosan Bears (2013); KT Wiz (2014–2016); Lotte Giants (2017–2018); Doosan Bears (2019–2020); SSG Landers (2021–2023); Lotte Giants (2024–2025)

Career highlights and awards
- Korean Series champion (1992)
Medals
Men's baseball
Representing South Korea
Gold medal – first place	2008 Beijing	Team

- Kim Min-jae
- Hangul: 김민재
- Hanja: 金敏宰
- RR: Gim Minjae
- MR: Kim Minjae

Kim Min-jae (Korean: 김민재; Hanja: 金敏宰; January 3, 1973 – January 14, 2026) was a South Korean baseball player and coach. A shortstop, he played for the Lotte Giants, SK Wyverns and Hanwha Eagles. He batted and threw right-handed. As a coach, he coached the Doosan Bears in the Korea Baseball Organization among others.

== Professional career ==
Kim graduated from Busan Technical High School in 1991. He was then signed by the Lotte Giants, and played for the Giants for eleven seasons. In 2002, Kim moved to the SK Wyverns. After the 2005 season his contract with the Wyverns ran out and he became a free agent. Before the 2006 season Kim signed with the Hanwha Eagles for four-years.

As Kim was considered one of the best defensive infielders in the KBO league, he had been regularly picked for the South Korea national team as a utility infielder.

In October 2002, Kim got first called up to the national squad, and competed in the Asian Games. He helped his team defend the gold medal, going 4-for-8 with 3 RBIs. A month later, Kim was joined in the South Korea national team again for the 2002 Intercontinental Cup held in Havana, Cuba.

In 2006, he was selected for the South Korea national team, and participated in the 2006 World Baseball Classic. Kim went 3-for-5 with an RBI over Team USA in Round 2. He hit a one-bounce ground rule double over the left field off setup man Dan Wheeler with two outs in the fourth inning, and smacked an RBI single off Mike Timlin in the sixth. At the last match of Round 2 against Team Japan, Kim drew a one-out walk in the eighth off Toshiya Sugiuchi and scored the tiebreaking run when Lee Jong-beom hit a two-RBI double.

In December 2007, Kim played for South Korea again at the Asian Baseball Championship held in Taichung, Taiwan. He went 3-for-3 with 3 RBIs, playing shortstop and second base during the competition.

On July 16, 2008, Kim was named to the South Korea national team for the 2008 Summer Olympics. Due to right ankle injury, he was mainly used as a substitute infielder or first base coach during the Olympics. But in the team's seventh game in the round-robin, against the Netherlands, Kim drew a two-out walk in the fifth off Alexander Smit and scored a run when Kim Hyun-soo hit a two-RBI single.

Kim retired from playing after the 2009 season but retained his assistant coaching position in the Eagles.

== Death ==
Kim died from cancer on January 14, 2026, at the age of 53.

== Notable international careers ==
Year	Venue	Competition	Team	Individual note
2002	South Korea	Asian Games	Gold medal	.500 BA (4-for-8), 3 RBI
2002	Cuba	Intercontinental Cup	Silver medal	
2006	United States	World Baseball Classic	Bronze medal	.273 BA (3-for-11), 1 RBI
2007	Chinese Taipei	Asian Baseball Championship	Silver medal	1.000 BA (3-for-3), 3 RBI
2008	China	Olympic Games	Gold medal	.000 BA (0-for-11), 1R
