= Tyrone Brandt =

South African baseball pitcher

- Pitcher
- Born: 10 November 1978 (age 47)
- Bats: Right Throws: Right

Tyrone Brandt (born November 10, 1978) is a baseball pitcher who has represented the South Africa national baseball team in tournaments. He played for the nation in the 2005 Baseball World Cup and was on the roster during the 2006 World Baseball Classic.
