= Javier Castillo =

Panamanian baseball player (born 1983)

Javier Castillo (born August 29, 1983 in Chitré, Herrera Province, Panama) is a minor league baseball player. He played for Panama in the 2006 World Baseball Classic and 2009 World Baseball Classic. He played professionally in the minor leagues from 2002 to 2010, mostly in the Chicago White Sox farm system.

In 2002, he played with the Dominican Summer League White Sox, hitting .193 in 2002 and .238 in 2003. With the Bristol White Sox in 2004, he hit .272 in 60 games. Baseball America ranked him as the 17th best prospect in the league that year. He split the 2005 season between the Great Falls White Sox and Kannapolis Intimidators, hitting .219 with the former and .226 with the latter. In 2006, he played with Kannapolis again, hitting .256 in 94 games. He appeared in two games in the World Baseball Classic that year.

With the Winston-Salem Warthogs and Charlotte Knights in 2007, he hit a combined .283 in 119 games. In 2008, he played for the Knights and Birmingham Barons, hitting a combined .289 in 102 games. He hit .313 in the 2008 Americas Baseball Cup.

In the 2009 World Baseball Classic, he hit .375 in eight at-bats. He played in 2010 for the Charlotte Knights in the White Sox farm system, where he hit .200 in 15 games.
