= Jorge Cortez =

Panamanian baseball player and coach

Jorge Cortes
- Pitcher
- Born: September 4, 1972 (age 53); Panama City, Panama
- Batted: Right Threw: Right

CPBL debut
- August 30, 2005, for the Sinon Bulls

Last CPBL appearance
- July 5, 2006, for the Sinon Bulls

CPBL statistics
- Win–loss record: 8–5
- Earned run average: 2.66
- Strikeouts: 73
- Stats at Baseball Reference

Teams
- Sinon Bulls (2005–2006)

Jorge Cortez (born September 4, 1972) is a Panamanian minor league baseball coach and former pitcher who was on Panama's roster in the 2006 World Baseball Classic and the 2009 World Baseball Classic. His last name is also spelled Cortes.

In the 2001 Baseball World Cup, Cortez got a start against the Canadian team, holding them to four hits in 7 1/3 innings. He pitched in the 2002 Intercontinental Cup, going 1–1 with a 9.39 ERA. Along with three other players, Cortez was caught doping during the Intercontintal Cup, thus costing Panama their bronze medal. Cortez was banned from international play for two years.

He was signed by the Cincinnati Reds and he played in their farm system in 2003. He played for the GCL Reds (two games), Potomac Cannons (five games), Chattanooga Lookouts (nine games) and Louisville Bats (one game), going a combined 1–3 with a 4.28 ERA in 17 games.

Cortez pitched for the Sinon Bulls of the Chinese Professional Baseball League in 2005, going 3–1 with a 2.96 ERA. In the 2006 World Baseball Classic, he appeared in one game, allowing two earned runs in two innings of work and earning the loss. He pitched for the Bulls in 2006, with whom he went 5–4 with a 2.48 ERA.

In the 2006 qualifier for the 2008 Olympics, Cortez went 1–1 with an 11.74 ERA. He also made one appearance in the 2008 Americas Baseball Cup. He did not make an appearance in the 2009 World Baseball Classic.

== Coaching career ==
On February 3, 2022, Cortes was named the manager of the Visalia Rawhide, the Single-A affiliate of the Arizona Diamondbacks.
