= Manuel Rodríguez (first baseman) =

Panamanian baseball player (born 1985)

- First baseman
- Born: January 6, 1985 (age 41); Chitré, Herrera Province, Panama
- Bats: Left Throws: Left
- Stats at Baseball Reference

Manuel O. Rodríguez (born January 6, 1985) is a Panamanian former professional baseball player. He was on Panama's roster for the 2006 World Baseball Classic. He played in the Atlanta Braves and Toronto Blue Jays farm systems from 2004 to 2009.

Rodríguez began his professional career in 2002, playing in the Dominican Republic until 2003. In 2004, he played for the GCL Braves, hitting .251 in 179 at-bats. For the Danville Braves in 2005, he hit .300 in 250 at-bats and for the Rome Braves in 2006, he hit .258 in 264 at-bats.

Rodríguez wound up in the Blue Jays farm system in 2007, playing for the Auburn Doubledays. He hit .291 with 10 home runs in 282 at-bats. In 2008, he hit .268 in 395 at-bats with the Lansing Lugnuts. In 2009, he played for the Dunedin Blue Jays and hit .263 with nine home runs in 105 games.

In the 2008 Americas Baseball Cup, Rodríguez hit .286.
