= Vince Perkins =

- Pitcher
- Born: September 27, 1981 (age 44); Victoria, British Columbia, Canada
- Bats: Left Throws: Right

Teams
- Toronto Blue Jays organization; Milwaukee Brewers organization; Chicago White Sox organization
Medals
Men's baseball
Representing Canada
Baseball World Cup
Bronze medal – third place	2009 Nettuno	Team

Mark Vincent Perkins (born September 27, 1981) is a Canadian former professional baseball pitcher. He played for the Canada national baseball team in the 2006 and 2009 World Baseball Classics.

== Career ==
Perkins was selected by the Baltimore Orioles in the next-to-last round of the 1999 Major League Baseball draft but did not sign. He was then picked by the Toronto Blue Jays in 18th round of the 2000 Major League Baseball draft. He began his professional career in 2001 with their Class A (Short Season) affiliate, the Auburn Doubledays. After spending 2002 with Auburn, he was promoted to the Class A Charleston Alley Cats and then the Class A-Advanced Dunedin Blue Jays in 2003. He remained in Dunedin for the 2004 season. In 2005, he was promoted the Blue Jays' Double-A New Hampshire Fisher Cats.

Perkins began to feel soreness in his elbow in 2004. Later, when playing for the Canada national baseball team in the 2006 World Baseball Classic, he injured his elbow while pitching against Mexico. He rehabbed both of these injuries. At the end of spring training with the Blue Jays, Perkins was placed on waivers. On April 12, 2006, he was claimed by the Milwaukee Brewers and immediately placed on their disabled list. After undergoing Tommy John surgery, he was sidelined for the entire 2006 season.

Perkins made his return to baseball in 2007 and was assigned to Milwaukee's Class A-Advanced Brevard County Manatees. During the season, he was promoted to their Double-A Huntsville Stars. During the off-season, he was promoted to their Triple-A Nashville Sounds. Perkins was later released by the Brewers and signed to a minor league contract with the Chicago White Sox on March 29, 2008, but was later released.

Perkins signed with the Camden Riversharks of the Atlantic League for the 2008 season.

Perkins started for Team Canada on March 9 in their game versus Italy at the 2009 World Baseball Classic.
