= Albenis Castillo =

Panamanian baseball player (born 1983)

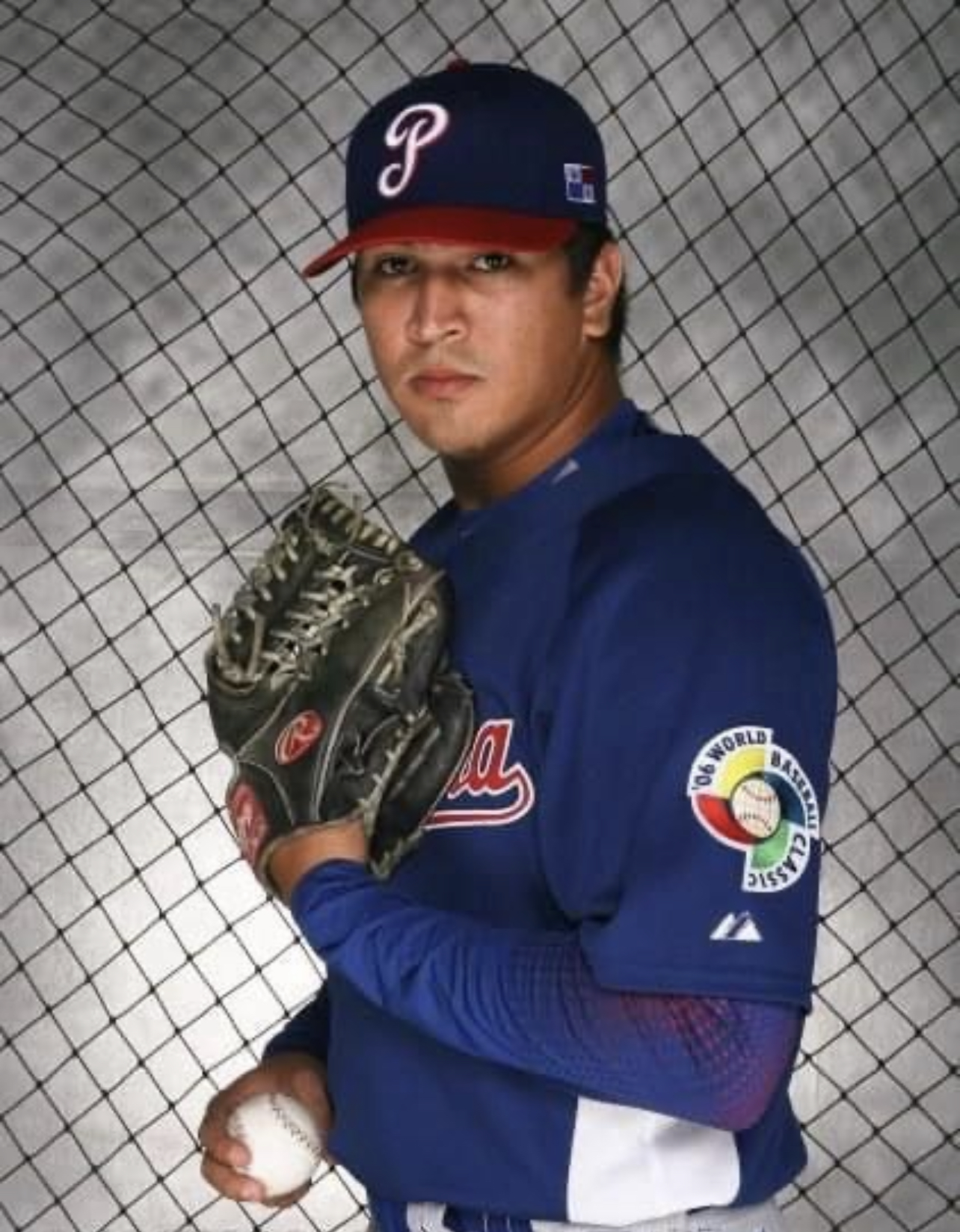

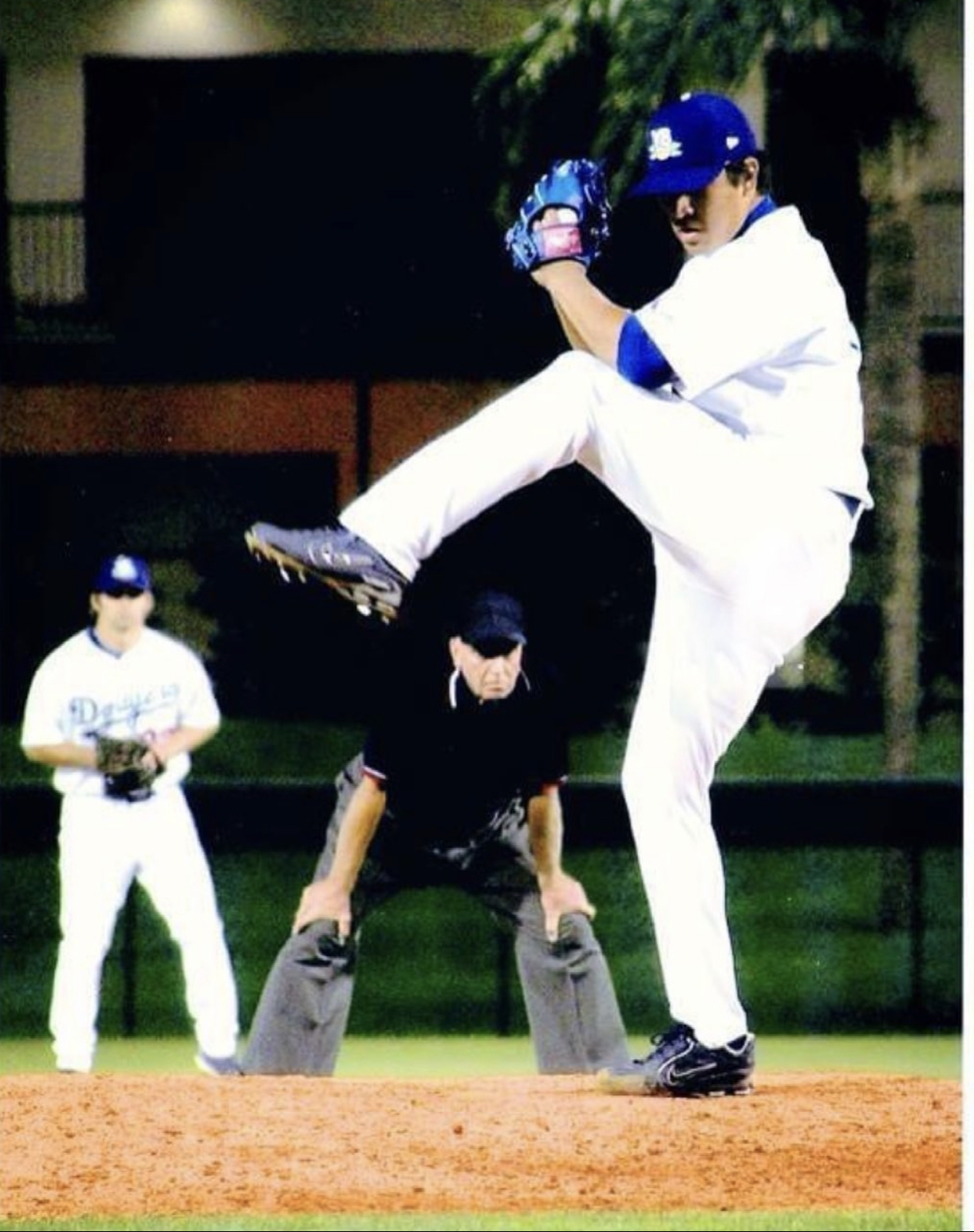

Albenis Enrique Castillo Gonzalez (born December 24, 1983) is a Panamanian former baseball pitcher. He was on Panama's roster in the 2003 Baseball World Cup and the 2006 World Baseball Classic.

He played professionally from 1998 to 2009 in the Los Angeles Dodgers farm system. He played in Venezuela Summer League in 2001 with the Dominican Summer League Dodgers in the Dominican Republic and with the South Georgia Waves in Columbus, Georgia in 2002; he went 0-0 with a 0.00 ERA in two games (one start). He pitched for the GCL Dodgers in Vero Beach, Florida in 2003, going 2-1 with a 2.72 ERA in 19 appearances. For the Ogden Raptors in Ogden, Utah in 2004, he went 2-2 with a 5.01 ERA in 12 games. He also appeared in nine games for the Columbus Catfish and went 1-1 with a 5.21 ERA with them. In 2005, he played for Columbus, going 1-5 and 10 saves with a 3.99 ERA in 38 appearances and in 2006 he went 3-5 with a 6.37 ERA in 35 appearances with the Vero Beach Dodgers, in Vero Beach in 2006 and 2007.

He made one appearance in the 2006 World Baseball Classic, pitching one-third of an inning and walking a batter, allowing a hit and striking out one batter.
