= Jim Buccheri =

Italian baseball player (born 1968)

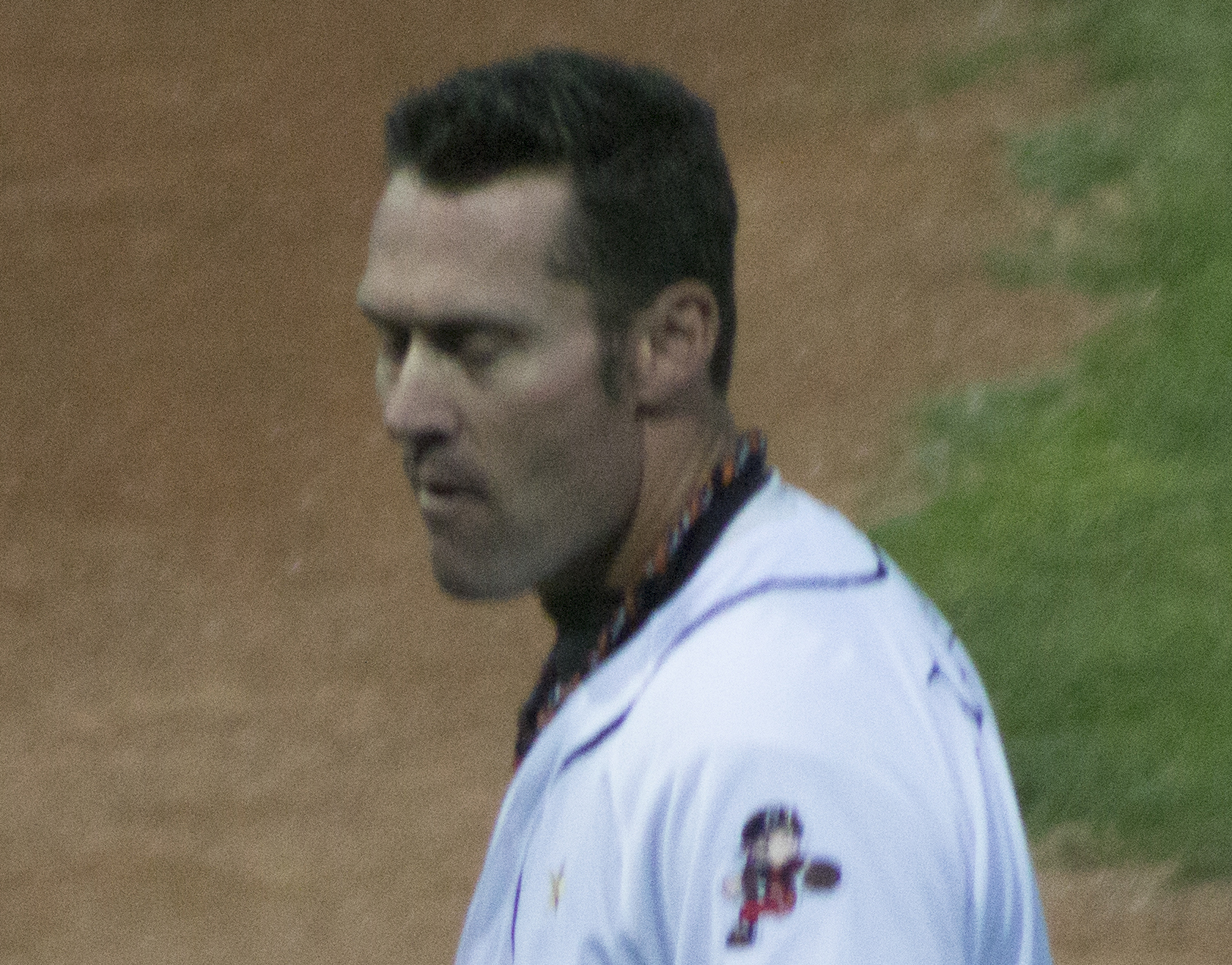
- Buccheri in 2013
- Outfielder / Second baseman
- Born: 12 November 1968 (age 57); Brooklyn, New York, U.S.
- Bats: Right Throws: Right
- Stats at Baseball Reference

James Francis Buccheri (born 12 November 1968) is an American baseball player who competed in the 2004 Summer Olympics for team Italy.

Buccheri played high school baseball at Vero Beach High School in Vero Beach, Florida and Cibola High School in New Mexico. He accepted a scholarship to play college baseball at the University of New Mexico but transferred to Golden West College. He was selected in the 24th round of the 1988 Major League Baseball draft by the Oakland Athletics after hitting .444 and stealing 46 bases in a season of community college baseball. He had committed to continue his college baseball career at Cal State Fullerton but chose to sign with the Athletics after failing to make the United States national baseball team which played at the 1988 Summer Olympics.

He began his professional career with the Southern Oregon A's of the Northwest League and played in affiliated Minor League Baseball until 2000, reaching as high as Triple-A. He went on to play several seasons in the Italian Baseball League, ending his career there in 2013.
