= Jack Santora =

Italian-American baseball player (born 1976)

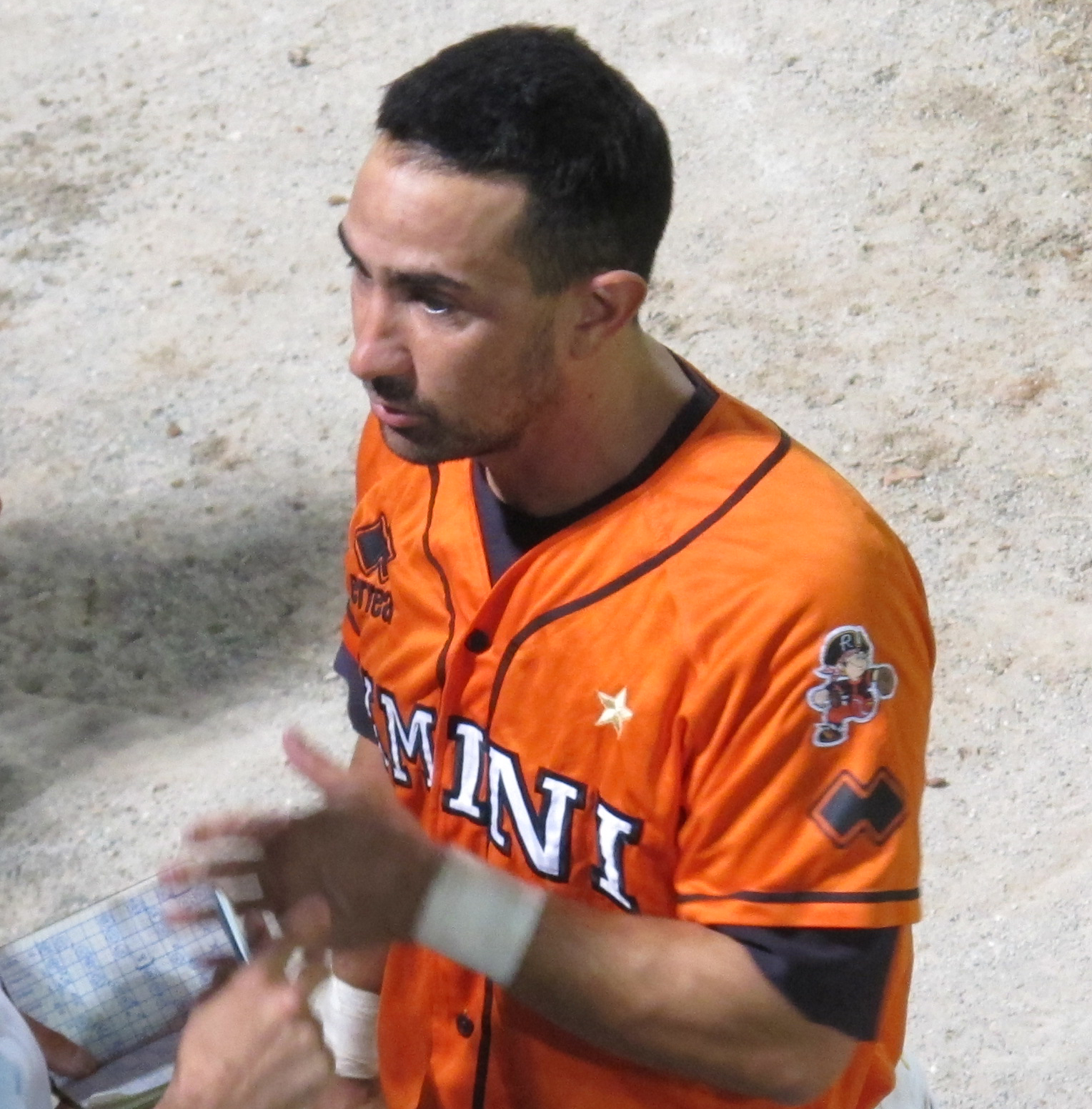
- Infielder / Coach
- Born: October 6, 1976 (age 49); Monterey, California, U.S.
- Bats: Switch Throws: Right
- Stats at Baseball Reference
Medals
Men's baseball
Representing Italy
European Baseball Championship
| Gold medal – first place | 2010 Germany | National team |

Jack Anthony Santora (born October 6, 1976) is an Italian-American former professional baseball infielder who played internationally for the Italy national baseball team, and is currently a coach in the Los Angeles Angels organization.

== Early life ==
Santora grew up in Monterey, CA. Father, Vic Santora, coached football and baseball. Brother, Phil Santora, coached high school baseball and softball at Monterey High School. Santora attended UCLA. In 1998, he played collegiate summer baseball for the Hyannis Mets of the Cape Cod Baseball League, and was named a league all-star.

== Professional career ==
=== Minor League Baseball ===
The Arizona Diamondbacks drafted Santora in the 19th Round of the 1999 Major League Baseball draft. He played for the Missoula Osprey in 1999. In 2000, he played for the South Bend Silver Hawks. In 2001, he played for the El Paso Diablos. He split 2002 between El Paso and the Tucson Sidewinders. In 2003, Santora played with the Lake Elsinore Storm in the San Diego Padres organization. In 2004, Santora played in the Philadelphia Phillies organization with the Lakewood BlueClaws and the Clearwater Threshers.

=== Independent Baseball League ===
Santora played with the Newark Bears from 2003–2006.

=== Italian Baseball League ===
He played for Telemarket Rimini in the Italian Baseball League from 2007-2013.

=== Italy national team ===
As a member of Italy national baseball team he won two European Baseball Championships, in 2010 and in 2012.

== Coaching career ==
Santora is a coach for the Salt Lake Bees which is the Los Angeles Angels Triple-A affiliate.
