= Adolfo Rivera =

Panamanian baseball player

Adolfo Rivera (born May 22, 1982) is a Panamanian former baseball player. He was on Panama's roster for the 2006 World Baseball Classic. He is 6'4" tall and weighs 215 pounds. He is right-handed.

Rivera had only one at-bat in his three appearances in the 2006 World Baseball Classic; he did not get a hit. In his other games, he was caught stealing once and scored one run. He was also on Panama's roster for the 2007 Pan American Games, 2009 Bolivarian Games, 2010 Central American Games, 2010 Central American and Caribbean Games and 2011 Pan American Games.
