= Huang Lung-yi =

Taiwanese baseball player

- Center fielder
- Born: February 20, 1979 (age 47)
- Bats: Right Throws: Right

debut
- March 7, 2003, for the La New Bears

Career statistics
- Batting average: .266
- Home run: 56
- Runs batted in: 264
- Stats at Baseball Reference

Teams
- First Financial Holdings Agan (2003); La New Bears (2004–2010)

Huang Lung-yi (Chinese: 黃龍義; born February 20, 1979) is a Taiwanese former professional baseball player. He played on the Chinese Taipei team at the 2006 World Baseball Classic.
