= Lin Hua-wei =

Taiwanese baseball coach

Fubon Guardians
- Coach / Manager / General manager
- Born: 27 May 1958 (age 67); Tainan, Taiwan
- Bats: Right Throws: Right

Teams
- As general manager: Fubon Guardians (2021–present)
Medals
Coach for Chinese Taipei
Men's baseball
Olympic Games
| Silver medal – second place | 1992 Barcelona | Team |

Lin Hua-wei (Chinese: 林華韋; pinyin: Lín Huá Wéi; born 27 May 1958) is a Taiwanese former baseball coach and manager and baseball executive. He currently serves as the general manager of the Fubon Guardians of the Chinese Professional Baseball League (CPBL) and Secretary General of the WBSC Asia (formerly the Baseball Federation of Asia).

== Career ==
As an amateur player, Lin represented Taiwan at international level from 1978 to 1985, including as part of the squad that participated in the demonstration tournament at the 1984 Summer Olympics held in Los Angeles.

After retirement, he joined the Chinese Taipei national baseball team coaching staff starting in 1990 until 2001. He coached in the 1992 Summer Olympics held in Barcelona, where Chinese Taipei won the silver medal.

Lin was the manager of the Chinese Taipei baseball team in the inaugural tournament of the World Baseball Classic in 2006.

In 2013 he was appointed as chancellor of the National Taiwan University of Sport, until 2021, when he was designated as general manager of the Fubon Guardians of the Chinese Professional Baseball League (CPBL).
