= Bienvenido Cedeño =

Panamanian baseball pitcher

Bienvenido Cedeno (born January 1, 1969) is a Panamanian former baseball pitcher. He was on Panama's roster for the 2006 World Baseball Classic. He made two appearances in that World Baseball Classic, allowing seven hits in 3 2/3 innings of work, and posted a 4.91 ERA. He also represented Panama in the 1997 Central American Games, when they won gold, and in the 2001 Bolivarian Games, when they won gold.

He is right-handed, and 5'8" tall and 175 pounds.
