= Yoni Lasso =

Yoni Javier Lasso (born November 22, 1984, in Panama City, Panama) is a former minor league baseball infielder. He played for Panama in the 2006 World Baseball Classic.

During his minor league baseball career, Lasso played in the Cincinnati Reds organization. In 2005, he played for the GCL Reds and Billings Mustangs, hitting .233 in 23 games for the former and only .095 in nine games for the latter. Overall, he hit .202 in 32 minor league games in 2005.

He spent 2006 with three teams - the Mustangs, the Dayton Dragons and the Sarasota Reds. With the Mustangs, he hit .167 in seven games. In five games with the Dragons, he hit .100 and in seven games for the Reds, he hit .067 in seven games. Overall, he hit .108 in 19 games. The 2006 season was his final minor league season - he hit .176 in 51 minor league games in his minor league career.

Lasso appeared in three games in the 2006 World Baseball Classic, collecting one hit in seven at-bats for a .143 batting average. His lone hit was a double.
