= Jung Jae-hoon =

South Korean baseball player (born 1980)

- Pitcher
- Born: January 1, 1980 (age 46)
- Batted: RIght Threw: Right

KBO debut
- 2003, for the Doosan Bears

Last KBO appearance
- August 3, 2016, for the Doosan Bears

KBO statistics
- Win–loss record: 35–44
- Earned run average: 3.14
- Strikeouts: 677
- Saves: 139
- Stats at Baseball Reference

Teams
- Doosan Bears (2003–2014); Lotte Giants (2015); Doosan Bears (2016)

Jung Jae-hoon
Medal record

Men's baseball

World Baseball Classic
Bronze medal – third place	2009 San Diego	Team

- Jung Jae-hoon
- Hangul: 정재훈
- Hanja: 鄭載勳
- RR: Jeong Jaehun
- MR: Chŏng Chaehun

Jung Jae-hoon (Korean: 정재훈; Hanja: 鄭載勳; born January 1, 1980, in Seoul, South Korea) is a South Korean pitcher who played for the Doosan Bears in the Korea Baseball Organization.
