= Wang Jingchao =

Chinese baseball player

Wang Jingchao 王 靖超
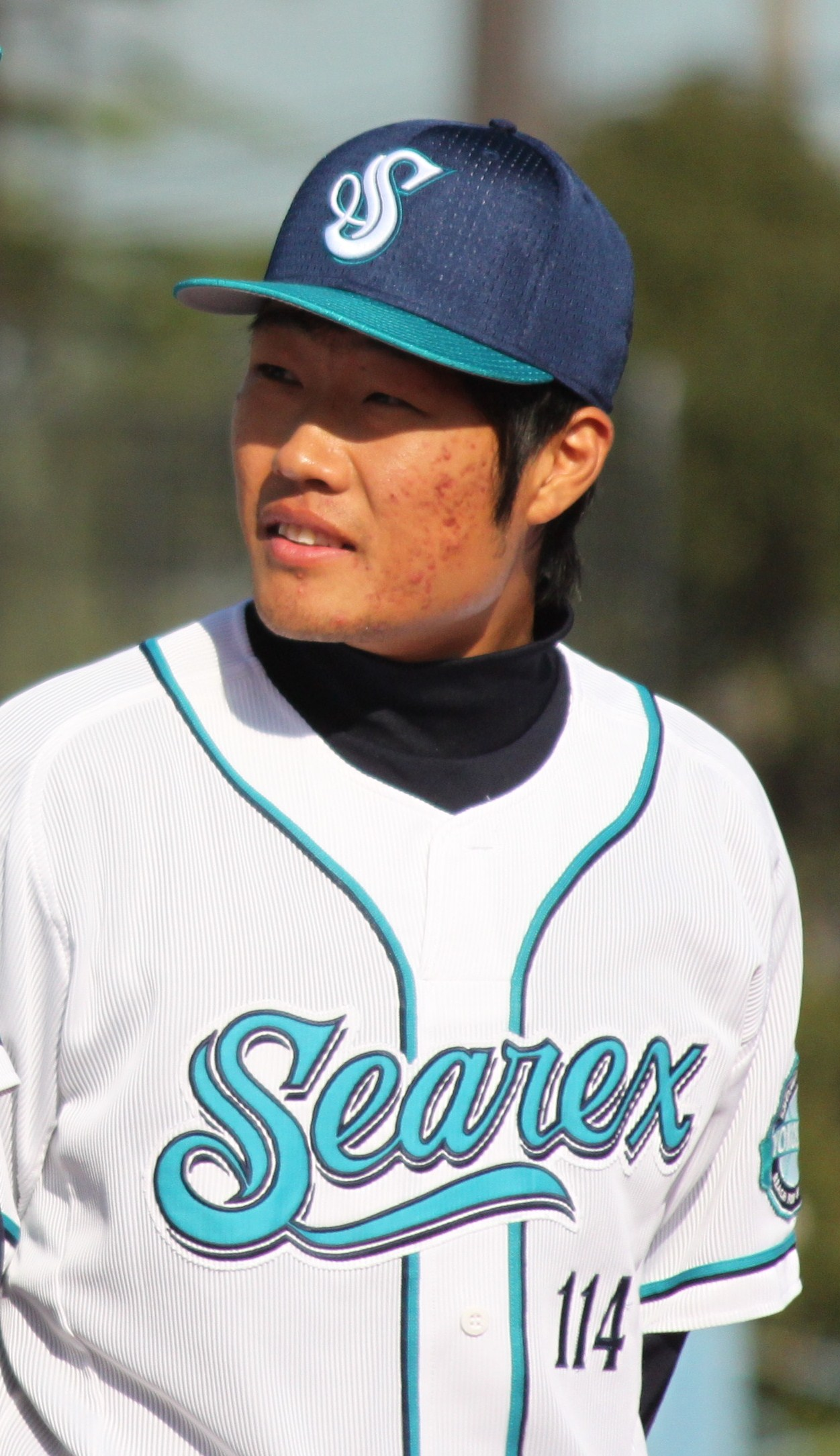
- infielder
- Born: July 13, 1988 (age 37); Tianjing, China
- Bats: Right Throws: Right

Teams
- Tianjin Lions (2005 – 2008, 2011 – 2013); Yokohama BayStars (2009 – 2010)

Wang Jingchao (Chinese: 王靖超; pinyin: Wáng Jìngchāo; born 13 July 1988 in Tianjin, China) is a former Chinese baseball infielder for the Tianjin Lions. He was a member of the China national baseball team competing in the 2009 World Baseball Classic.
