= Eduardo Paret =

Cuban baseball player

- Shortstop
- Born: October 23, 1972 (age 53); Santa Clara, Villa Clara, Cuba
- Bats: Right Throws: Right

SNB debut
- April 15, 1997, for the Naranjas de Villa Clara

SNB statistics (through 2008)
- Home runs: 139
- Average: .293

Teams
- Naranjas de Villa Clara (1997-2008)

Career highlights and awards
- Baseball World Cup MVP (2005)
Medals
Men's baseball
Representing Cuba
World Baseball Classic
Silver medal – second place	2006 San Diego	Team
Olympic Games
Gold medal – first place	1996 Atlanta	Team
Gold medal – first place	2004 Athens	Team
Silver medal – second place	2008 Beijing	Team
Baseball World Cup
Gold medal – first place	2001 Taipei	Team
Gold medal – first place	2003 Cuba	Team
Gold medal – first place	2005 Netherlands	Team
Silver medal – second place	2007 Taipei	Team
Intercontinental Cup
Gold medal – first place	1995 Havana	Team
Gold medal – first place	2002 Havana	Team
Gold medal – first place	2006 Taipei	Team
Pan American Games
Gold medal – first place	1995 Mar del Plata	Team
Gold medal – first place	2003 Santo Domingo	Team
Gold medal – first place	2007 Rio de Janeiro	Team
Central American and Caribbean Games
Gold medal – first place	1993 Ponce	Team
Gold medal – first place	2006 Cartagena	Team

Eduardo Paret Pérez (born October 23, 1972, in Santa Clara) is a Cuban former baseball player. He is a shortstop for Villa Clara of the Cuban National Series, and for the Cuban national baseball team.

Paret was the starting shortstop on the Cuban teams that won gold medals at the 1996 and 2004 Summer Olympics and second place at the 2006 World Baseball Classic. He was named most valuable player of the 2005 Baseball World Cup after going 12 for 19 with 8 stolen bases in the tournament.

In July 1997, Paret and his Villa Clara teammates Osmani García and Angel López spoke with Cuban defector Rolando Arrojo by telephone. As a result, they were banned from Cuban baseball for "maintaining contact with baseball traitors." The ban has since been lifted. On July 28, 2006, ESPN.com reported that Paret and Yulieski Gurriel had defected from Cuba and into Colombia. . Days later, Gurriel denied the report.
