= Liu Guangbiao =

Chinese baseball player

- Born: September 1978 (age 47); Guangzhou, China
- Other names: 刘广标
- Occupation: Baseball infielder
- Notable work: a member of the China national baseball team competing in the 2009 World Baseball Classic

Liu Guangbiao (simplified Chinese: 刘广标; traditional Chinese: 劉廣標; pinyin: Liú Guǎngbiāo; Cantonese: Lau4 Yim2 Biu1; born September 5, 1978) is a Chinese former baseball infielder for the Guangdong Leopards. He was a member of the China national baseball team competing in the 2009 World Baseball Classic.
