= María Fernanda Ceriani =

Argentine biologist

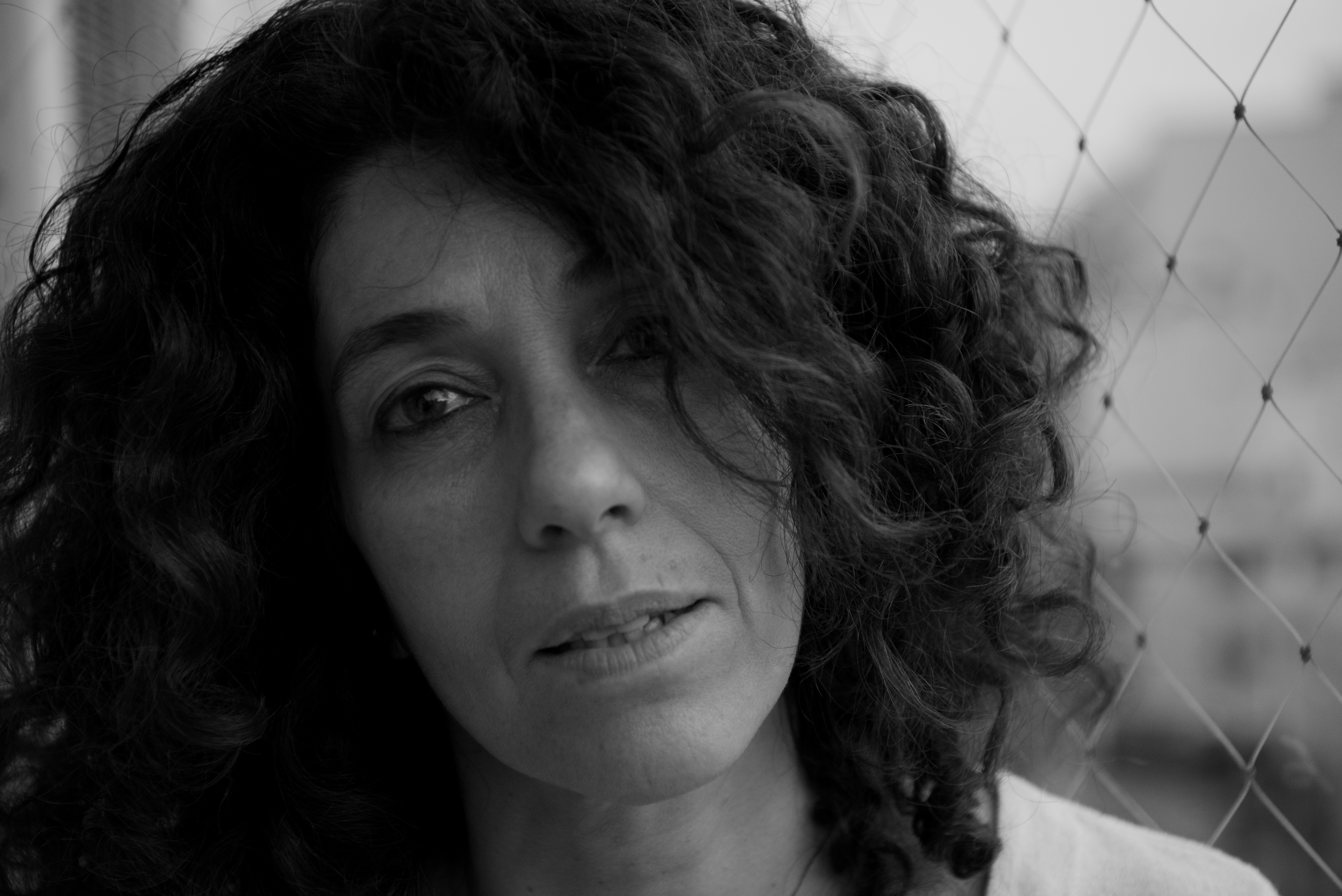
- Ceriani in 2019
- Born: 26 May 1966 (age 60); Ramos Mejía, Argentina
- Education: University of Buenos Aires; Scripps Research Institute
- Awards: L'Oréal-UNESCO For Women in Science Award (2011)
- Scientific career
- Fields: Biology, circadian rhythms
- Workplaces: Leloir Institute Foundation; National Scientific and Technical Research Council

María Fernanda Ceriani is an Argentine biologist. She studies the neuronal mechanisms involved in the regulation of circadian rhythms, using Drosophila melanogaster as a biological model. She is the president of INIS Biotech, heads the Behavioral Genetics Laboratory at the Leloir Institute Foundation, and is a researcher with the National Scientific and Technical Research Council (CONICET). Ceriani received her PhD from the University of Buenos Aires and did postdoctoral research at the Scripps Research Institute. She won a L'Oréal-UNESCO For Women in Science Award in 2011.

== Early life and education ==
María Fernanda Ceriani was born on 26 May 1966 in Ramos Mejía, Argentina. She graduated from the Escuela Nacional Normal Superior Manuel Dorrego in 1983. Ceriani attended the Faculty of Exact and Natural Sciences of the University of Buenos Aires, earning her MSc in biology in 1990 and a PhD in biological sciences in 1996. She started her doctorate with Esteban Hopp at the Institute of Biotechnology of the National Agricultural Technology Institute in Castelar, and continued research in Roger N. Beachy's laboratory at Scripps Research in La Jolla, California. She was a postdoctoral fellow at Scripps Research, working in the laboratory of chronobiologist Steve A. Kay from 1997 to 2002. She then returned to Argentina, where she was selected in a contest to repatriate researchers to start a laboratory at the Leloir Institute Foundation.

== Scientific career ==
Ceriani studies the neuronal mechanisms involved in the regulation of circadian rhythms. She principally works with Drosophila melanogaster as a biological model and employs behavioral experiments and immunohistochemistry. She has authored papers with Michael Rosbash and has written about circadian plasticity in Drosophila.

Ceriani is the president of INIS Biotech, the technology liaison office of Leloir Institute, and has headed the Behavioral Genetics Laboratory at the Leloir Institute Foundation since 2002. She is also a researcher with the National Scientific and Technical Research Council (CONICET) and has membership in the Latin American Academy of Sciences as of 2019. In 2021, she was appointed a member of European Molecular Biology Organization as principal investigator of the Institute for Biochemical Research at CONICET.

Ceriani received the national L'Oréal-UNESCO For Women in Science Award in 2011. She received a Konex Award in 2013.

Ceriani's laboratory received funding from the National Institutes of Health in 2020 for a research collaboration with universities in California and Washington to describe structural changes of clock neurons that regulate the circadian rhythms in the brains of mice and Drosophila flies. Following the COVID-19 pandemic, Ceriani was part of a group of researchers from CONICET studying the impact of social isolation on circadian rhythms in 2021. She was a project leader in the development of Mi Reloj Interno, an app for monitoring the rhythms.

== Personal life ==
Ceriani has three children, two of whom are twins.

== Selected publications ==
- Ceriani, Maria Fernanda; Hopp, H. Esteban; Hahne, Günther (March 1992). "Cotyledons: an Explant for Routine Regeneration of Sunflower Plants". Plant and Cell Physiology. doi:10.1093/oxfordjournals.pcp.a078234.
- Darlington, Thomas K.; Wager-Smith, Karen; Ceriani, M. Fernanda (5 June 1998). "Closing the Circadian Loop: CLOCK-Induced Transcription of Its Own Inhibitors per and tim". Science. 280 (5369): 1599–1603. Bibcode:1998Sci...280.1599D. doi:10.1126/science.280.5369.1599. PMID 9616122.
- Ceriani, M. Fernanda; Darlington, Thomas K.; Staknis, David (23 July 1999). "Light-Dependent Sequestration of TIMELESS by CRYPTOCHROME". Science. 285 (5427): 553–556. doi:10.1126/science.285.5427.553. PMID 10417378.
- Ceriani, M. Fernanda; Hogenesch, John B.; Yanovsky, Marcelo (1 November 2002). "Genome-Wide Expression Analysis in Drosophila Reveals Genes Controlling Circadian Behavior". The Journal of Neuroscience. 22 (21): 9305–9319. doi:10.1523/JNEUROSCI.22-21-09305.2002. PMC 6758054. PMID 12417656.
- de la Paz Fernández, María; Chu, Jessie; Villella, Adriana; Atkinson, Nigel; Kay, Steve A.; Ceriani, María Fernanda (2007). "Impaired Clock Output by Altered Connectivity in the Circadian Network". Proceedings of the National Academy of Sciences of the United States of America. 104 (13): 5650–5655. Bibcode:2007PNAS..104.5650F. doi:10.1073/pnas.0608260104. ISSN 0027-8424. JSTOR 25427250. PMC 1838506. PMID 17369364.
