= Marc LaMacchia =

Italian baseball player (born 1982)

- Pitcher
- Born: 27 March 1982 (age 43); Dunedin, Florida, U.S.
- Bats: Right Throws: Right

Marc R. LaMacchia (born 27 March 1982) is an American former professional baseball player who played internationally for the Italian national team at the 2006 World Baseball Classic.

== Amateur career ==
Lamacchia played high school baseball at East Lake High School in Tarpon Springs, Florida, before accepting a partial scholarship to play college baseball at Florida State University. LaMacchia was the starter and the winning pitcher in the title game of the 2002 Atlantic Coast Conference baseball tournament. In 2002, he played collegiate summer baseball with the Cotuit Kettleers of the Cape Cod Baseball League. On March 12, 2003, Florida State announced that LaMacchia, then a junior, would be undergoing Tommy John Surgery. Although Florida State announced that he would return to the team, he was selected by the Texas Rangers in the 21st round of the 2003 Major League Baseball draft and elected to sign.

== Professional and international career ==
LaMacchia played in the Rangers' farm system until 2006 and in the Florida Marlins' system from 2006 to 2008. Lamacchia also was a member of the Italian national team at the 2006 World Baseball Classic. In 2010, he pitched in the Italian Baseball League for Nettuno.
