= Tyrone Lamont =

South African baseball player

- Pitcher
- Born: 3 April 1985 (age 40); Durban, South Africa
- Bats: Right Throws: Right
- Stats at Baseball Reference

Tyrone R. Lamont (born 3 April 1985 in Durban) is a South African baseball pitcher. He played in the 2006 World Baseball Classic with the South Africa national baseball team. In 2003, Lamont signed as an undrafted free agent with the Seattle Mariners organization. In 2004 and 2005, Lamont pitched for the Arizona League Mariners.
