= Robert Verschuren =

South African pitcher (born 1984)

- Born: May 31 1984
- Bats: Right Throws: Right

Robert Verschuren (born May 31 1984) is a South African baseball pitcher who played for for South Africa at the 2006 and 2009 World Baseball Classic, as well as the Kempton Red Sox.
