= César Quintero (baseball) =

Panamanian baseball player (born 1982)

César Augusto Quintero (born November 16, 1982, in Chitré, Herrera Province, Panama) is a former minor league baseball catcher. He played for Panama in the 2006 World Baseball Classic and 2009 World Baseball Classics.

He began his professional career in 2001, playing in the Venezuelan Summer League, hitting .253. In 2002, he hit .319 and slugged .524 while playing in the VSL. He played for the AZL Mariners and Inland Empire 66ers in 2003, hitting a combined .321 in 31 games. He hit only .250 in seven games for the AZL Mariners in 2004.

Quintero had one at-bat in the 2006 World Baseball Classic, grounding into a double play. He also had one at-bat in the 2009 World Baseball Classic - he struck out.
