= Guo Tao (baseball) =

Chinese baseball player

Guo Tao (Chinese: 国涛; pinyin: Guó Tāo; born 21 March 1987) is a Chinese baseball player. He was a member of the China national baseball team and competed in the 2006 World Baseball Classic.

Guo Tao played for the Beijing Tigers of the China Baseball League. He won the MVP award during the 2006 China Baseball League All-Star Game, hitting the only home run.
