= Donald J. Metz =

American nuclear engineer (1924–1999)

- Born: May 18, 1924; Brooklyn, New York
- Died: May 9, 1999 (aged 74); East Patchogue, Long Island
- Education: St. Francis College (B.S.); Polytechnic Institute of Brooklyn (Ph.D.)
- Known for: Effect of radiation on polymers.
- Scientific career
- Fields: Nuclear Engineering
- Workplaces: Brookhaven National Laboratory

Donald J. Metz (May 18, 1924 – May 9, 1999) was an American nuclear engineer at Brookhaven National Laboratory. Metz's research focused on the effects of radiation on polymerization.

== Early life and education ==
Metz began his undergraduate education at St. Francis College in 1941, yet it was interrupted by World War II. For three years he was in the infantry in Europe, yet upon his return he once again enrolled in St. Francis College and completed his B.S. in chemistry in 1947. Metz went on to conduct graduate work at the Polytechnic Institute of Brooklyn and was granted an M.S. in 1949, and a Ph.D. in physical chemistry in 1955.

== Career ==
=== Brookhaven National Laboratory ===
In 1954, Metz joined the staff at Brookhaven National Laboratory in the nuclear engineering department. While there he was appointed supervisor of radiation research in the radiation division. By 1972, Metz headed the chemical sciences division in the department of applied sciences. To pursue his interest in science education Dr. Metz relinquished his position in 1985 to become the head of the Office of Educational Programs (OEP). In 1993, Metz retired after having expanded the OEP, oversaw the creation of a new Science Learning Center, and started at Brookhaven, what would become a nationwide educators program at D.O.E. laboratory's.

Metz also gave two laboratory-wide lectures while at BNL; the 70th Brookhaven Lecture on Radiation and Organic Liquids and the 169th Brookhaven Lecture on Energy Future: A Prime for Secondary School Teachers.

=== St. Francis College ===
From 1947 to 1976, Metz was a professor of chemistry and physics at St. Francis College. During his tenure, Metz was known to be a devoted professor, so although he worked full-time at Brookhaven National Laboratory, he would teach classes on Saturdays.

== Philanthropy ==
A few years after Metz retired in 1993, Donald and Dorothy Metz donated $100,000 to establish a scholarship program for the disabled children of Brookhaven lab employees. Named the Gorman-Metz scholarship in memory of Mr. and Mrs. Metz's parents, the award was given for the first time in March 1997. The awardees have been chosen by the National Center for Disability Services, and the scholarship has been administered by Brookhaven's Diversity Office.

== Awards ==
- 1985 Robert A. Leahy Memorial Outstanding Citizenship Award.
