= Matt Ceriani =

Italian American baseball player

- Catcher / Right fielder
- Born: 9 October 1976 (age 49); Vallejo, California, U.S.
- Bats: Right Throws: Right

Matt Steven Ceriani (born 9 October 1976) is an Italian-American baseball catcher who played professionally from 1998 to 2010. He graduated from Vanden High School in Fairfield, California before playing college baseball at Ole Miss, he majored in exercise science and was on the Southeastern Conference's Baseball Academic Honor Roll.

Ceriani was drafted out of college and began his professional career in independent baseball in 1998 with the Evansville Otters. During that season, his contract was purchased from the Otters by the Milwaukee Brewers. He played in Milwaukee's farm system until 2001, reaching as high as Double-A with the Huntsville Stars in 2000. He returned to independent baseball to start the 2002 season, playing for the Solano Steelheads with his brother, Ryan. During that season, his contract was purchased by the Arizona Diamondbacks and he finished the year in Double-A with the El Paso Diablos. He was released during the 2003 season and spent the rest of his career in unaffiliated ball with the exception of a spring training invitation from the Cleveland Indians in 2004. Between 2003 and 2010, he played for ten different teams (including two seasons with the Kansas City T-Bones) in seven different leagues (including three seasons in the Golden Baseball League and two in the Italian Baseball League).

In 2006, he was a member of the Italy national baseball team at the 2006 World Baseball Classic. He is a citizen of both Italy and the United States.

After retiring as a player, Ceriani coached youth baseball players and developed a device to measure catchers' pop times more reliably than a stopwatch.

He married Anna-Marie Kusiak in October of 2024.
