= John Mangieri =

Italian American baseball player (born 1976)

- Pitcher
- Born: 24 September 1976 (age 50); Howard Beach, New York, U.S.
- Bats: Right Throws: Right
- Stats at Baseball Reference

John Joseph Mangieri (born September 24, 1976) is an American former professional baseball player. Mangieri played first base at Archbishop Molloy High School in Queens, New York before playing college baseball as a pitcher at St. Francis College in Brooklyn for three seasons. He was selected in the tenth round of the 1997 Major League Baseball draft by the New York Mets.

Mangieri spent two seasons in the Mets farm system with the Pittsfield Mets and the Gulf Coast League Mets. He played the following six seasons in the independent Northern League, Atlantic League and the Northeast League with the Massachusetts Mad Dogs, New Jersey Jackals, Atlantic City Surf, Pennsylvania Road Warriors, Bridgeport Bluefish and Bangor Lumberjacks. He also spent parts of the 2004 and 2005 seasons playing in the Italian Baseball League for T & A San Marino.

In late 2005, after having been removed from affiliated Minor League Baseball for seven years, he was personally contacted by Dan Jennings, an executive with the Florida Marlins, who invited him to throw in a private session. Following that tryout, he was invited to spring training. In 2006, he played for Italy in the World Baseball Classic. He spent the 2006 season, his last in professional baseball, in the Marlins' farm system pitching for the Jupiter Hammerheads.

In 2014, he coached Beach Channel High School to a city championship in the Public Schools Athletic League at Yankee Stadium.
