= 2005 Baseball World Cup =

Sports season of a baseball league

XXXVI World Cup Baseball

Tournament details
- Country: Netherlands
- Venue(s): 5 (in 5 host cities)
- Dates: 2–17 September
- Teams: 18

Final positions
- Champions: Cuba (25th title)
- Runner-up: South Korea
- Third place: Panama
- Fourth place: Netherlands

Tournament statistics
- Games played: 84

Awards
- MVP: (Cuba) Eduardo Paret

The 2005 Baseball World Cup (BWC) was the 36th international Men's amateur baseball tournament. The tournament was sanctioned by the International Baseball Federation, which titled it the Amateur World Series from the 1938 tournament through the 1986 AWS. The tournament was held, for the second time, in the Netherlands, from September 2 to 17. Cuba defeated South Korea in the final, winning its 25th title.

There were 18 participating countries, split into two groups, with the first four of each group qualifying for the finals. Games were played in the Dutch cities of Rotterdam, Haarlem, Almere, Amsterdam and Eindhoven.

The next three competitions were also held as the BWC tournament, which was replaced in 2015 by the quadrennial WBSC Premier12.

== Venues ==
Rotterdam	Haarlem	Almere
Neptunus Familiestadion	Pim Mulier Stadion	Fanny Blankers Koen Sportpark
Capacity: 2,200	Capacity: 4,500	Capacity: 2,500
2005 Baseball World Cup is located in Netherlands
2005 Baseball World Cup is located in Netherlands	Amsterdam	Eindhoven
2005 Baseball World Cup is located in Netherlands	Sportpark Ookmeer	Sportpark de Heihoef
2005 Baseball World Cup is located in Netherlands	Capacity: 2,000	Capacity: 2,000

== First round ==
=== Pool A ===
==== Standings ====
Pos	Team	W	L	RS	RA
1	Cuba	8	0	70	15
2	Netherlands	7	1	81	18
3	Panama	6	2	54	35
4	South Korea	5	3	36	27
5	Canada	4	4	63	41
6	China	3	5	42	58
7	Brazil	2	6	28	53
8	Sweden	1	7	22	88
9	South Africa	0	8	15	76

==== Schedule and results ====
2 September 2005; 19:15 (UTC+2)	Netherlands	13 – 3	China	Neptunus Familiestadion, Rotterdam
2 September 2005; 19:15 (UTC+2)		Boxscore		Neptunus Familiestadion, Rotterdam

3 September 2005; 13:00 (UTC+2)	Sweden	0 – 18 (F/7)	Netherlands	Neptunus Familiestadion, Rotterdam
3 September 2005; 13:00 (UTC+2)		Boxscore		Neptunus Familiestadion, Rotterdam

3 September 2005; 13:00 (UTC+2)	South Africa	2 – 12 (F/7)	Cuba	Pim Mulierstadion, Haarlem
3 September 2005; 13:00 (UTC+2)		Boxscore		Pim Mulierstadion, Haarlem

3 September 2005; 13:00 (UTC+2)	South Korea	3 – 5	Panama	Sportpark Ookmeer, Amsterdam
3 September 2005; 13:00 (UTC+2)		Boxscore		Sportpark Ookmeer, Amsterdam

3 September 2005; 13:00 (UTC+2)	China	6 – 5 (F/15)	Brazil	Sportpark de Heihoef, Eindhoven
3 September 2005; 13:00 (UTC+2)		Boxscore		Sportpark de Heihoef, Eindhoven

4 September 2005; 13:00 (UTC+2)	Netherlands	6 – 2	South Korea	Neptunus Familiestadion, Rotterdam
4 September 2005; 13:00 (UTC+2)		Boxscore		Neptunus Familiestadion, Rotterdam

4 September 2005; 13:00 (UTC+2)	Brazil	2 – 1	South Africa	Pim Mulierstadion, Haarlem
4 September 2005; 13:00 (UTC+2)		Boxscore		Pim Mulierstadion, Haarlem

4 September 2005; 13:00 (UTC+2)	Canada	10 – 0 (F/7)	Sweden	Sportpark Fanny Blankers-Koen, Almere
4 September 2005; 13:00 (UTC+2)		Boxscore		Sportpark Fanny Blankers-Koen, Almere

4 September 2005; 19:00 (UTC+2)	Panama	2 – 6	Cuba	Pim Mulierstadion, Haarlem
4 September 2005; 19:00 (UTC+2)		Boxscore		Pim Mulierstadion, Haarlem

5 September 2005; 13:00 (UTC+2)	South Korea	7 – 6	Canada	Sportpark de Heihoef, Eindhoven
5 September 2005; 13:00 (UTC+2)		Boxscore		Sportpark de Heihoef, Eindhoven

5 September 2005; 19:00 (UTC+2)	Cuba	11 – 1 (F/7)	Brazil	Neptunus Familiestadion, Rotterdam
5 September 2005; 19:00 (UTC+2)		Boxscore		Neptunus Familiestadion, Rotterdam

5 September 2005; 19:00 (UTC+2)	South Africa	1 – 11	China	Sportpark Fanny Blankers-Koen, Almere
5 September 2005; 19:00 (UTC+2)		Boxscore		Sportpark Fanny Blankers-Koen, Almere

5 September 2005; 19:00 (UTC+2)	Sweden	1 – 11 (F/7)	Panama	Sportpark de Heihoef, Eindhoven
5 September 2005; 19:00 (UTC+2)		Boxscore		Sportpark de Heihoef, Eindhoven

6 September 2005; 13:00 (UTC+2)	Cuba	15 – 0 (F/7)	Sweden	Neptunus Familiestadion, Rotterdam
6 September 2005; 13:00 (UTC+2)		Boxscore		Neptunus Familiestadion, Rotterdam

6 September 2005; 13:00 (UTC+2)	Canada	12 – 1 (F/7)	South Africa	Pim Mulierstadion, Haarlem
6 September 2005; 13:00 (UTC+2)		Boxscore		Pim Mulierstadion, Haarlem

6 September 2005; 19:00 (UTC+2)	China	4 – 5	Panama	Neptunus Familiestadion, Rotterdam
6 September 2005; 19:00 (UTC+2)		Boxscore		Neptunus Familiestadion, Rotterdam

6 September 2005; 19:00 (UTC+2)	Netherlands	7 – 0	Brazil	Pim Mulierstadion, Haarlem
6 September 2005; 19:00 (UTC+2)		Boxscore		Pim Mulierstadion, Haarlem

7 September 2005; 18:00 (UTC+2)	China	8 – 12	Cuba	Sportpark Ookmeer, Amsterdam
7 September 2005; 18:00 (UTC+2)		Boxscore		Sportpark Ookmeer, Amsterdam

7 September 2005; 19:00 (UTC+2)	South Africa	2 – 20 (F/7)	Netherlands	Neptunus Familiestadion, Rotterdam
7 September 2005; 19:00 (UTC+2)		Boxscore		Neptunus Familiestadion, Rotterdam

7 September 2005; 19:00 (UTC+2)	Panama	13 – 6	Canada	Pim Mulierstadion, Haarlem
7 September 2005; 19:00 (UTC+2)		Boxscore		Pim Mulierstadion, Haarlem

7 September 2005; 19:00 (UTC+2)	Brazil	0 – 4	South Korea	Sportpark de Heihoef, Eindhoven
7 September 2005; 19:00 (UTC+2)		Boxscore		Sportpark de Heihoef, Eindhoven

9 September 2005; 19:00 (UTC+2)	Cuba	4 – 1	South Korea	Neptunus Familiestadion, Rotterdam
9 September 2005; 19:00 (UTC+2)		Boxscore		Neptunus Familiestadion, Rotterdam

9 September 2005; 19:00 (UTC+2)	Canada	3 – 7	Netherlands	Pim Mulierstadion, Haarlem
9 September 2005; 19:00 (UTC+2)		Boxscore		Pim Mulierstadion, Haarlem

9 September 2005; 19:00 (UTC+2)	Panama	8 – 5	Brazil	Sportpark Fanny Blankers-Koen, Almere
9 September 2005; 19:00 (UTC+2)		Boxscore		Sportpark Fanny Blankers-Koen, Almere

9 September 2005; 19:00 (UTC+2)	Sweden	5 – 7	China	Sportpark de Heihoef, Eindhoven
9 September 2005; 19:00 (UTC+2)		Boxscore		Sportpark de Heihoef, Eindhoven

10 September 2005; 13:00 (UTC+2)	Canada	0 – 7	Cuba	Sportpark Ookmeer, Amsterdam
10 September 2005; 13:00 (UTC+2)		Boxscore		Sportpark Ookmeer, Amsterdam

10 September 2005; 18:00 (UTC+2)	South Africa	4 – 10	Sweden	Sportpark Ookmeer, Amsterdam
10 September 2005; 18:00 (UTC+2)		Boxscore		Sportpark Ookmeer, Amsterdam

10 September 2005; 19:00 (UTC+2)	Netherlands	9 – 5	Panama	Pim Mulierstadion, Haarlem
10 September 2005; 19:00 (UTC+2)		Boxscore		Pim Mulierstadion, Haarlem

10 September 2005; 19:00 (UTC+2)	South Korea	3 – 1	China	Sportpark de Heihoef, Eindhoven
10 September 2005; 19:00 (UTC+2)		Boxscore		Sportpark de Heihoef, Eindhoven

11 September 2005; 13:00 (UTC+2)	Cuba	3 – 1	Netherlands	Neptunus Familiestadion, Rotterdam
11 September 2005; 13:00 (UTC+2)		Boxscore		Neptunus Familiestadion, Rotterdam

11 September 2005; 13:00 (UTC+2)	South Korea	4 – 3 (F/13)	South Africa	Sportpark de Heihoef, Eindhoven
11 September 2005; 13:00 (UTC+2)		Boxscore		Sportpark de Heihoef, Eindhoven

11 September 2005; 18:00 (UTC+2)	China	2 – 14 (F/7)	Canada	Sportpark Ookmeer, Amsterdam
11 September 2005; 18:00 (UTC+2)		Boxscore		Sportpark Ookmeer, Amsterdam

11 September 2005; 19:00 (UTC+2)	Brazil	11 – 4	Sweden	Neptunus Familiestadion, Rotterdam
11 September 2005; 19:00 (UTC+2)		Boxscore		Neptunus Familiestadion, Rotterdam

12 September 2005; 13:00 (UTC+2)	Panama	5 – 1	South Africa	Neptunus Familiestadion, Rotterdam
12 September 2005; 13:00 (UTC+2)		Boxscore		Neptunus Familiestadion, Rotterdam

12 September 2005; 13:00 (UTC+2)	Sweden	2 – 12 (F/8)	South Korea	Pim Mulierstadion, Haarlem
12 September 2005; 13:00 (UTC+2)		Boxscore		Pim Mulierstadion, Haarlem

12 September 2005; 19:00 (UTC+2)	Brazil	4 – 12	Canada	Neptunus Familiestadion, Rotterdam
12 September 2005; 19:00 (UTC+2)		Boxscore		Neptunus Familiestadion, Rotterdam

=== Pool B ===
==== Standings ====
Pos	Team	W	L	RS	RA
1	Japan	7	1	73	19
2	Nicaragua	6	2	53	27
3	Puerto Rico	6	2	53	34
4	United States	6	2	61	40
5	Australia	4	4	41	26
6	Chinese Taipei	3	5	48	39
7	Spain	2	6	32	61
8	Colombia	2	6	25	62
9	Czech Republic	0	8	13	91

==== Schedule and results ====
3 September 2005; 19:00 (UTC+2)	Chinese Taipei	10 – 1	Czech Republic	Neptunus Familiestadion, Rotterdam
3 September 2005; 19:00 (UTC+2)		Boxscore		Neptunus Familiestadion, Rotterdam

3 September 2005; 19:00 (UTC+2)	Australia	4 – 2	Puerto Rico	Pim Mulierstadion, Haarlem
3 September 2005; 19:00 (UTC+2)		Boxscore		Pim Mulierstadion, Haarlem

3 September 2005; 19:00 (UTC+2)	Spain	2 – 9	Japan	Sportpark Fanny Blankers-Koen, Almere
3 September 2005; 19:00 (UTC+2)		Boxscore		Sportpark Fanny Blankers-Koen, Almere

4 September 2005; 13:00 (UTC+2)	Puerto Rico	5 – 4	Japan	Sportpark Ookmeer, Amsterdam
4 September 2005; 13:00 (UTC+2)		Boxscore		Sportpark Ookmeer, Amsterdam

4 September 2005; 18:30 (UTC+2)	United States	12 – 1 (F/7)	Colombia	Sportpark de Heihoef, Eindhoven
4 September 2005; 18:30 (UTC+2)		Boxscore		Sportpark de Heihoef, Eindhoven

4 September 2005; 19:00 (UTC+2)	Czech Republic	5 – 15 (F/8)	Spain	Neptunus Familiestadion, Rotterdam
4 September 2005; 19:00 (UTC+2)		Boxscore		Neptunus Familiestadion, Rotterdam

4 September 2005; 19:00 (UTC+2)	Nicaragua	2 – 0	Australia	Sportpark Fanny Blankers-Koen, Almere
4 September 2005; 19:00 (UTC+2)		Boxscore		Sportpark Fanny Blankers-Koen, Almere

5 September 2005; 13:00 (UTC+2)	Japan	19 – 0 (F/7)	Czech Republic	Neptunus Familiestadion, Rotterdam
5 September 2005; 13:00 (UTC+2)		Boxscore		Neptunus Familiestadion, Rotterdam

5 September 2005; 13:00 (UTC+2)	Spain	2 – 12 (F/7)	Chinese Taipei	Pim Mulierstadion, Haarlem
5 September 2005; 13:00 (UTC+2)		Boxscore		Pim Mulierstadion, Haarlem

5 September 2005; 18:00 (UTC+2)	Colombia	0 – 10 (F/8)	Puerto Rico	Sportpark Ookmeer, Amsterdam
5 September 2005; 18:00 (UTC+2)		Boxscore		Sportpark Ookmeer, Amsterdam

5 September 2005; 19:00 (UTC+2)	Australia	4 – 6	United States	Pim Mulierstadion, Haarlem
5 September 2005; 19:00 (UTC+2)		Boxscore		Pim Mulierstadion, Haarlem

6 September 2005; 13:00 (UTC+2)	Japan	12 – 0 (F/7)	Colombia	Sportpark Ookmeer, Amsterdam
6 September 2005; 13:00 (UTC+2)		Boxscore		Sportpark Ookmeer, Amsterdam

6 September 2005; 13:00 (UTC+2)	Chinese Taipei	4 – 6	Puerto Rico	Sportpark de Heihoef, Eindhoven
6 September 2005; 13:00 (UTC+2)		Boxscore		Sportpark de Heihoef, Eindhoven

6 September 2005; 18:00 (UTC+2)	United States	11 – 1 (F/7)	Spain	Sportpark Ookmeer, Amsterdam
6 September 2005; 18:00 (UTC+2)		Boxscore		Sportpark Ookmeer, Amsterdam

6 September 2005; 19:00 (UTC+2)	Nicaragua	1 – 0	Czech Republic	Sportpark Fanny Blankers-Koen, Almere
6 September 2005; 19:00 (UTC+2)		Boxscore		Sportpark Fanny Blankers-Koen, Almere

7 September 2005; 13:00 (UTC+2)	Spain	2 – 5	Nicaragua	Neptunus Familiestadion, Rotterdam
7 September 2005; 13:00 (UTC+2)		Boxscore		Neptunus Familiestadion, Rotterdam

7 September 2005; 13:00 (UTC+2)	Puerto Rico	6 – 12	United States	Pim Mulierstadion, Haarlem
7 September 2005; 13:00 (UTC+2)		Boxscore		Pim Mulierstadion, Haarlem

7 September 2005; 13:00 (UTC+2)	Chinese Taipei	1 – 7	Japan	Sportpark Fanny Blankers-Koen, Almere
7 September 2005; 13:00 (UTC+2)		Boxscore		Sportpark Fanny Blankers-Koen, Almere

7 September 2005; 19:00 (UTC+2)	Czech Republic	0 – 14 (F/7)	Australia	Sportpark Fanny Blankers-Koen, Almere
7 September 2005; 19:00 (UTC+2)		Boxscore		Sportpark Fanny Blankers-Koen, Almere

8 September 2005; 18:00 (UTC+2)	Colombia	2 – 12 (F/8)	Nicaragua	Sportpark Ookmeer, Amsterdam
8 September 2005; 18:00 (UTC+2)		Boxscore		Sportpark Ookmeer, Amsterdam

9 September 2005; 13:00 (UTC+2)	United States	2 – 14	Nicaragua	Neptunus Familiestadion, Rotterdam
9 September 2005; 13:00 (UTC+2)		Boxscore		Neptunus Familiestadion, Rotterdam

9 September 2005; 13:00 (UTC+2)	Puerto Rico	11 – 1 (F/8)	Czech Republic	Pim Mulierstadion, Haarlem
9 September 2005; 13:00 (UTC+2)		Boxscore		Pim Mulierstadion, Haarlem

9 September 2005; 13:00 (UTC+2)	Colombia	3 – 2	Chinese Taipei	Sportpark de Heihoef, Eindhoven
9 September 2005; 13:00 (UTC+2)		Boxscore		Sportpark de Heihoef, Eindhoven

9 September 2005; 18:00 (UTC+2)	Japan	4 – 2	Australia	Sportpark Ookmeer, Amsterdam
9 September 2005; 18:00 (UTC+2)		Boxscore		Sportpark Ookmeer, Amsterdam

10 September 2005; 13:00 (UTC+2)	Australia	4 – 11	Chinese Taipei	Neptunus Familiestadion, Rotterdam
10 September 2005; 13:00 (UTC+2)		Boxscore		Neptunus Familiestadion, Rotterdam

10 September 2005; 13:00 (UTC+2)	Spain	6 – 4	Colombia	Pim Mulierstadion, Haarlem
10 September 2005; 13:00 (UTC+2)		Boxscore		Pim Mulierstadion, Haarlem

10 September 2005; 19:00 (UTC+2)	Nicaragua	5 – 6	Puerto Rico	Neptunus Familiestadion, Rotterdam
10 September 2005; 19:00 (UTC+2)		Boxscore		Neptunus Familiestadion, Rotterdam

10 September 2005; 19:00 (UTC+2)	United States	6 – 7	Japan	Sportpark Fanny Blankers-Koen, Almere
10 September 2005; 19:00 (UTC+2)		Boxscore		Sportpark Fanny Blankers-Koen, Almere

11 September 2005; 19:00 (UTC+2)	Japan	11 – 3	Nicaragua	Pim Mulierstadion, Haarlem
11 September 2005; 19:00 (UTC+2)		Boxscore		Pim Mulierstadion, Haarlem

11 September 2005; 19:00 (UTC+2)	Czech Republic	3 – 14	Colombia	Sportpark Fanny Blankers-Koen, Almere
11 September 2005; 19:00 (UTC+2)		Boxscore		Sportpark Fanny Blankers-Koen, Almere

11 September 2005; 19:00 (UTC+2)	Australia	8 – 0	Spain	Sportpark de Heihoef, Eindhoven
11 September 2005; 19:00 (UTC+2)		Boxscore		Sportpark de Heihoef, Eindhoven

12 September 2005; 15:00 (UTC+2)	Nicaragua	11 – 4	Chinese Taipei	Sportpark Fanny Blankers-Koen, Almere
12 September 2005; 15:00 (UTC+2)		Boxscore		Sportpark Fanny Blankers-Koen, Almere

12 September 2005; 18:00 (UTC+2)	Czech Republic	3 – 7	United States	Sportpark Ookmeer, Amsterdam
12 September 2005; 18:00 (UTC+2)		Boxscore		Sportpark Ookmeer, Amsterdam

12 September 2005; 19:00 (UTC+2)	Colombia	1 – 5	Australia	Pim Mulierstadion, Haarlem
12 September 2005; 19:00 (UTC+2)		Boxscore		Pim Mulierstadion, Haarlem

12 September 2005; 19:00 (UTC+2)	Puerto Rico	7 – 4	Spain	Sportpark de Heihoef, Eindhoven
12 September 2005; 19:00 (UTC+2)		Boxscore		Sportpark de Heihoef, Eindhoven

13 September 2005; 15:00 (UTC+2)	Chinese Taipei	4 – 5	United States	Pim Mulierstadion, Haarlem
13 September 2005; 15:00 (UTC+2)		Boxscore		Pim Mulierstadion, Haarlem

== Playoffs ==
Quarter-finals
Cuba	11
United States	3
Nicaragua	1
Panama	2
Japan	1
South Korea	5
Netherlands (8 inn.)	10
Puerto Rico	0

Semi-finals
Cuba (7 inn.)	15
Panama	2
South Korea	7
Netherlands	0

Final
Cuba	3
South Korea	0
Third place
Panama	7
Netherlands	6

5th–8th place
United States	0
Nicaragua	9
Japan	5
Puerto Rico	0

Fifth place
Nicaragua	1
Japan	8
Seventh place
United States	11
Puerto Rico	3

=== Quarter-finals ===
14 September 2005; 19:00 (UTC+2)	Cuba	11 – 3	United States	Neptunus Familiestadion, Rotterdam
14 September 2005; 19:00 (UTC+2)		Boxscore		Neptunus Familiestadion, Rotterdam

14 September 2005; 19:00 (UTC+2)	Japan	1 – 5	South Korea	Sportpark de Heihoef, Eindhoven
14 September 2005; 19:00 (UTC+2)		Boxscore		Sportpark de Heihoef, Eindhoven

14 September 2005; 19:00 (UTC+2)	Nicaragua	1 – 2	Panama	Sportpark Fanny Blankers-Koen, Almere
14 September 2005; 19:00 (UTC+2)		Boxscore		Sportpark Fanny Blankers-Koen, Almere

14 September 2005; 19:00 (UTC+2)	Netherlands	10 – 0 (F/8)	Puerto Rico	Pim Mulierstadion, Haarlem
14 September 2005; 19:00 (UTC+2)		Boxscore		Pim Mulierstadion, Haarlem

=== 5th–8th place ===
16 September 2005; 13:00 (UTC+2)	United States	0 – 9	Nicaragua	Sportpark Ookmeer, Amsterdam

16 September 2005; 13:00 (UTC+2)	Japan	5 – 0	Puerto Rico	Pim Mulierstadion, Haarlem
16 September 2005; 13:00 (UTC+2)		Boxscore		Pim Mulierstadion, Haarlem

=== Semi-finals ===
16 September 2005; 19:00 (UTC+2)	Panama	2 – 15 (F/7)	Cuba	Pim Mulierstadion, Haarlem
16 September 2005; 19:00 (UTC+2)		Boxscore		Pim Mulierstadion, Haarlem

16 September 2005; 19:10 (UTC+2)	South Korea	7 – 0	Netherlands	Neptunus Familiestadion, Rotterdam
16 September 2005; 19:10 (UTC+2)		Boxscore		Neptunus Familiestadion, Rotterdam

=== 7th place game ===
17 September 2005; 10:30 (UTC+2)	United States	11 – 3	Puerto Rico	Sportpark Ookmeer, Amsterdam
17 September 2005; 10:30 (UTC+2)		Boxscore		Sportpark Ookmeer, Amsterdam

=== 5th place game ===
17 September 2005; 14:30 (UTC+2)	Nicaragua	1 – 8	Japan	Sportpark Ookmeer, Amsterdam
17 September 2005; 14:30 (UTC+2)		Boxscore		Sportpark Ookmeer, Amsterdam

=== Bronze medal game ===
17 September 2005; 13:00 (UTC+2)	Panama	7 – 6	Netherlands	Pim Mulierstadion, Haarlem
17 September 2005; 13:00 (UTC+2)		Boxscore		Pim Mulierstadion, Haarlem

=== Final ===
17 September 2005; 19:00 (UTC+2)	South Korea	0 – 3	Cuba	Neptunus Familiestadion, Rotterdam
17 September 2005; 19:00 (UTC+2)		Boxscore		Neptunus Familiestadion, Rotterdam

== Final standings ==
Pos	Team	W	L
Gold medal	Cuba	11	0
Silver medal	South Korea	7	4
Bronze medal	Panama	8	3
4	Netherlands	8	3
5	Japan	9	2
6	Nicaragua	7	4
7	United States	7	4
8	Puerto Rico	6	5
9	Canada	4	4
10	Australia	4	4
11	Chinese Taipei	3	5
12	China	3	5
13	Brazil	2	6
14	Spain	2	6
15	Colombia	2	6
16	Sweden	1	7
17	South Africa	0	8
18	Czech Republic	0	8

== Awards ==
Tournament Awards
Award	Player
MVP	(Cuba) Eduardo Paret
Leading hitter	(Cuba) Eduardo Paret
Pitcher with best ERA	(Cuba) Pedro Luis Lazo
Pitcher with best win/loss average	(Panama) Ramón Ramírez
Most Runs batted in	(Canada) Joey Votto
Most Home runs	(Cuba) Yuliesky Gourriel
Most Stolen bases	(Cuba) Eduardo Paret
Most Runs scored	(Cuba) Eduardo Paret
Outstanding defensive player	(Netherlands) Dirk van 't Klooster

All Star Team
Position	Player
Pitchers	(Cuba) Pedro Luis Lazo
Pitchers	(Netherlands) Diegomar Markwell
Catcher	(Japan) Tsutomu Takanezawa
First base	(Netherlands) Percy Isenia
Second base	(Chinese Taipei) Chen Yung-chi
Third base	(Cuba) Yuliesky Gourriel
Shortstop	(Cuba) Eduardo Paret
Outfield	(Panama) Freddy Herrera
Outfield	(Netherlands) Danny Rombley
Outfield	(Brazil) Tiago Magalhães
Designated hitter	(Canada) Joey Votto
