= 2008 Copa América (baseball) =

The 2008 Copa América de Béisbol was held in the Venezuelan cities of Puerto Ordaz and El Tigre, from September 26 to October 7. The tournament acted as a qualifier for the 2009 World Cup. The competition was used to select the teams that represented Central and South America — including the Caribbean — in the Baseball World Cup.

== Format and participation ==
The tournament is split up into 2 groups. Group A consists of Venezuela, Nicaragua, Colombia, Netherlands Antilles and Mexico, and Group B consists of Puerto Rico, Brazil, Aruba, Guatemala and Panama.

Cuba did not compete because they already qualified for the 2009 World Cup as they were Olympic competitors the same year.

== Results ==
Puerto Rico won the tournament, defeating Nicaragua 4:1 in the final.

== Final Standing ==
Place	Team
Gold	Puerto Rico
Silver	Nicaragua
Bronze	Mexico
4	Netherlands Antilles
5	Venezuela
6	Panama
7	Brazil
8	Aruba
9	Guatemala and Colombia

2008 Americas Baseball champions

Puerto Rico
First title

== Notable players ==
- C: César Quintero, Panama (.577/.593/.846)
- 1B: Carlos Rivera, Puerto Rico (MVP) (.375/.444/.719, 3 HR, 10 RBI)
- 2B: Ofilio Castro, Nicaragua (.480/.536/.640, 7 R, 7 RBI)
- SS: Andy González, Puerto Rico (.379/.455/.517, 8 R)
- 3B: Agustín Murillo, Mexico (.323/.353/.742, 4 2B, 3 HR, 7 R, 11 RBI)
- OF: Willie Vasquez, Venezuela (.414/.469/.483)
- OF: Ardley Jansen, Netherlands Antilles (.444/.467/.963, 4 HR, 8 R, 8 RBI)
- OF: Danilo Sotelo, Nicaragua (.385/.393/.462)
- DH: José Velázquez, Puerto Rico (.308/.379/.462)
- RHP: Johnny Gregorius, Netherlands Antilles (2-0, 0 R, 5 H in 15 IP)
- LHP: Raymond Martes, Netherlands Antilles (1-1, 5.02)

== See also ==
- Baseball awards#Americas
- Baseball at the Pan American Games
- Baseball at the Central American and Caribbean Games
- Baseball at the South American Games
- 2004 Americas Olympic Baseball Qualifying Tournament
