= 2015 WBSC Premier12 rosters =

The following is a list of squads for each nation competing at the 2015 WBSC Premier12.

== Group A ==
=== Cuba ===
Manager: Víctor Mesa

Pos.	No.	Player	Date of birth (age)	Bats	Throws	Club
P	15	Freddy Álvarez	April 29, 1989 (aged 26)			(Cuba) Naranjas de Villa Clara
P	53	Danny Betancourt	May 27, 1981 (aged 34)			Avispas de Santiago de Cuba
P	29	Yennier Canó	March 9, 1994 (aged 21)			(Cuba) Tigres de Ciego de Ávila
P	51	Yoalkis Cruz	May 28, 1979 (aged 36)			(Cuba) Leñadores de Las Tunas
P	99	José García	February 23, 1981 (aged 34)			(Cuba) Sabuesos de Holguín
P	33	Norberto González	October 10, 1979 (aged 36)			(Cuba) Industriales
P	85	Miguel Lahera	January 24, 1985 (aged 30)			(Cuba) Cazadores de Artemisa
P	27	Jonder Martínez	June 22, 1978 (aged 37)			(Cuba) Cocodrilos de Matanzas
P	34	Héctor Mendoza	May 3, 1994 (aged 21)			(Japan) Yomiuri Giants
P	89	Liván Moinelo	December 8, 1995 (aged 19)			(Cuba) Vegueros de Pinar del Río
P	28	Frank Montieth	January 11, 1985 (aged 30)			(Cuba) Industriales
P	56	Yosvani Torres	June 14, 1980 (aged 35)			(Cuba) Vegueros de Pinar del Río
P	58	Yoanni Yera	October 18, 1989 (aged 26)			(Cuba) Cocodrilos de Matanzas
C	11	Yosvany Alarcón	October 15, 1984 (aged 31)			(Cuba) Leñadores de Las Tunas
C	45	Frank Morejón	January 25, 1986 (aged 29)			(Cuba) Industriales
C	31	Osvaldo Vázquez	May 20, 1990 (aged 25)			(Cuba) Tigres de Ciego de Ávila
OF	54	Alfredo Despaigne	June 17, 1987 (aged 28)			(Japan) Chiba Lotte Marines
OF	19	Lourdes Gurriel Jr.	October 10, 1993 (aged 22)			(Cuba) Industriales
OF	18	Stayler Hernández	July 17, 1982 (aged 33)			(Cuba) Industriales
OF	71	Julio Pablo Martínez	March 21, 1996 (aged 19)			(Cuba) Indios de Guantánamo
IF	35	Yorbis Borroto	February 6, 1985 (aged 30)			(Cuba) Tigres de Ciego de Ávila
IF	47	Yurisbel Gracial	October 14, 1985 (aged 30)			(Cuba) Cocodrilos de Matanzas
IF	10	Yulieski Gurriel	June 9, 1984 (aged 31)			(Cuba) Industriales
IF	20	Yunieski Gurriel	February 17, 1982 (aged 33)			(Cuba) Industriales
IF	55	Alexander Mayeta	February 22, 1977 (aged 38)			(Cuba) Industriales
IF	42	Yordan Manduley	February 9, 1986 (aged 29)			(Cuba) Sabuesos de Holguín
IF	50	Rudith Reyes	November 5, 1979 (aged 36)			(Cuba) Industriales
IF	24	Yasiel Santoya	January 24, 1987 (aged 28)			(Cuba) Cocodrilos de Matanzas

=== Chinese Taipei ===
Manager: Kuo Tai-yuan

Pos.	No.	Player	Date of birth (age)	Bats	Throws	Club
P	32	Yu-Hsun Chen	May 20, 1989 (aged 26)			(Taiwan) Lamigo Monkeys
P	17	Hung-Wen Chen	February 3, 1986 (aged 29)			(Taiwan) Chinatrust Brothers
P	19	Kuan-Yu Chen	October 29, 1990 (aged 25)			(Japan) Chiba Lotte Marines
P	75	Chun-Lin Kuo	February 2, 1992 (aged 23)			(Japan) Saitama Seibu Lions
P	81	Po-Yu Lin	September 16, 1986 (aged 29)			(Taiwan) Lamigo Monkeys
P	14	Tzu-Wei Lin	September 17, 1995 (aged 20)			(Taiwan) Uni-President 7-Eleven Lions
P	49	Chia-Jen Lo	April 7, 1986 (aged 29)			(Taiwan) EDA Rhinos
P	44	Kuo-Hua Lo	October 28, 1986 (aged 29)			(United States) Minnesota Twins (Elizabethton Twins)
P	15	Yen-Ching Lu	March 10, 1995 (aged 20)			National Taiwan University of Physical Education and Sport
P	36	Fu-Te Ni	November 14, 1982 (aged 32)			(Taiwan) EDA Rhinos
P	18	Wei-Lun Pan	March 5, 1982 (aged 33)			(Taiwan) Uni-President 7-Eleven Lions
P	43	Chia-Hao Sung	September 6, 1992 (aged 23)			(Japan) Tohoku Rakuten Golden Eagles
P	41	Ching-Ming Wang	January 16, 1986 (aged 29)			(Taiwan) Uni-President 7-Eleven Lions
C	47	Jin-De Jhang	May 17, 1993 (aged 22)			(United States) Pittsburgh Pirates (Bradenton Marauders)
C	34	Chih-Kang Kao	February 7, 1981 (aged 34)			(Taiwan) Uni-President 7-Eleven Lions
C	11	Hung-Yu Lin	March 21, 1986 (aged 29)			(Taiwan) Lamigo Monkeys
IF	29	Chun-Hsiu Chen	November 1, 1988 (aged 27)			(Taiwan) Lamigo Monkeys
IF	13	Yung-Chi Chen	July 13, 1983 (aged 32)			(Taiwan) Uni-President 7-Eleven Lions
IF	99	Chih-Hsien Chiang	February 21, 1988 (aged 27)			(Taiwan) Chinatrust Brothers
IF	21	Yen-Wen Kuo	October 25, 1988 (aged 27)			(Taiwan) Lamigo Monkeys
IF	31	Chih-Sheng Lin	January 1, 1982 (aged 33)			(Taiwan) Lamigo Monkeys
IF	9	Yi-Chuan Lin	November 11, 1985 (aged 29)			(Taiwan) EDA Rhinos
IF	69	Chih-Hsiang Lin	March 8, 1987 (aged 28)			(Taiwan) Uni-President 7-Eleven Lions
OF	66	Chien-Ming Chang	July 27, 1980 (aged 35)			(Taiwan) EDA Rhinos
OF	7	Chih-Hao Chang	May 15, 1987 (aged 28)			(Taiwan) Chinatrust Brothers
OF	28	Kuo-Hui Kao	September 26, 1985 (aged 30)			(Taiwan) EDA Rhinos
OF	91	Po-Jung Wang	September 9, 1993 (aged 22)			(Taiwan) Lamigo Monkeys
OF	1	Dai-Kang Yang	January 17, 1987 (aged 28)			(Japan) Hokkaido Nippon-Ham Fighters

=== Netherlands ===
Manager: Hensley Meulens

Pos.	No.	Player	Date of birth (age)	Bats	Throws	Club
P	19	Rob Cordemans	October 31, 1974 (aged 41)			(Netherlands) Amsterdam Pirates
P	36	Diegomar Markwell	August 8, 1980 (aged 35)			(Netherlands) Curaçao Neptunus
P	49	Jair Jurrjens	January 29, 1986 (aged 29)			(United States) Colorado Rockies (Albuquerque Isotopes)
P	39	Shairon Martis	March 30, 1987 (aged 28)			(United States) Lincoln Saltdogs
P	45	Juan Carlos Sulbaran	September 11, 1989 (aged 26)			(United States) Kansas City Royals (Omaha Storm Chasers)
P	46	Loek van Mil	September 15, 1984 (aged 31)			(United States) Minnesota Twins (Rochester Red Wings)
P	3	Berry van Driel	December 26, 1984 (aged 30)			(Netherlands) Curaçao Neptunus
P	37	Bayron Cornellise	November 4, 1993 (aged 22)			(Netherlands) Vaessen Pioniers
P	13	Kevin Heijstek	April 19, 1988 (aged 27)			(Netherlands) Amsterdam Pirates
P	26	Tom Stuifbergen	September 26, 1988 (aged 27)			(Netherlands) Corendon Kinheim
P	40	Orlando Yntema	February 21, 1986 (aged 29)			(Netherlands) Curaçao Neptunus
P	50	Jim Ploeger	June 21, 1991 (aged 24)			(Netherlands) UVV Utrecht
P	20	Mike Bolsenbroek	November 3, 1987 (aged 28)			(Germany) Regensburg Legionaere
C	22	Shawn Zarraga	January 21, 1989 (aged 26)			(United States) Los Angeles Dodgers (Oklahoma City Dodgers)
C	12	Dashenko Ricardo	March 1, 1990 (aged 25)			(Netherlands) Corendon Kinheim
C	30	Gianison Boekhoudt	October 15, 1989 (aged 26)			(Netherlands) Curaçao Neptunus
IF	25	Andruw Jones	April 23, 1977 (aged 38)			—
IF	9	Curt Smith	September 9, 1986 (aged 29)			(United States) Lincoln Saltdogs
IF	16	Hainley Statia	January 19, 1986 (aged 29)			—
IF	1	Carlton Daal	August 1, 1993 (aged 22)			(United States) Cincinnati Reds (Daytona Tortugas)
IF	7	Yurendell DeCaster	September 26, 1979 (aged 36)			(Mexico) Piratas de Campeche
IF	15	Sharlon Schoop	April 15, 1987 (aged 28)			(United States) Baltimore Orioles (Norfolk Tides)
OF	14	Randolph Oduber	March 18, 1989 (aged 26)			(United States) Washington Nationals (Potomac Nationals)
OF	17	Cristopher Garia	December 26, 1992 (aged 22)			(United States) Texas Rangers (High Desert Mavericks)
OF	35	Kalian Sams	August 25, 1986 (aged 29)			(Canada) Québec Capitales
OF	4	Wladimir Balentien	July 2, 1984 (aged 31)			(Japan) Yakult Swallows

=== Canada ===
Manager: Ernie Whitt

Pos.	No.	Player	Date of birth (age)	Bats	Throws	Club
P	27	Andrew Albers	October 6, 1985			(Canada) Toronto Blue Jays (Buffalo Bisons)
C	21	Justin Atkinson	July 24, 1993			(Canada) Toronto Blue Jays (Lansing Lugnuts)
P	47	Phillippe Aumont	January 7, 1989			(Canada) Toronto Blue Jays (Buffalo Bisons)
C	22	Kellin Deglan	May 3, 1992			(United States) Texas Rangers (Frisco RoughRiders)
P	20	Scott Diamond	July 30, 1986			(United States) Tampa Bay Rays (Durham Bulls)
P	28	Ethan Elias	April 27, 1993			(United States) Arizona Diamondbacks (Kane County Cougars)
OF	19	Tyson Gillies	October 31, 1988			(United States) San Diego Padres (San Antonio Missions)
IF	14	Taylor Green	November 2, 1986			(United States) Milwaukee Brewers (Biloxi Shuckers)
P	40	Shawn Hill	April 28, 1981			(United States) York Revolution
C	34	Dustin Houle	November 9, 1993			(United States) Milwaukee Brewers (Brevard County Manatees)
IF	15	Sean Jamieson	March 2, 1989			(United States) Arizona Diamondbacks (Mobile BayBears)
OF	18	Brock Kjeldgaard	January 22, 1986			(United States) Sioux City Explorers
IF	37	Jordan Lennerton	February 16, 1986			(United States) Atlanta Braves (Gwinnett Braves)
P	52	Chris Leroux	August 21, 1984			(United States) Philadelphia Phillies (Lehigh Valley IronPigs)
P	24	Kyle Lotzkar	October 24, 1989			(United States) Texas Rangers (Frisco RoughRiders)
P	35	Dustin Molleken	August 21, 1984			(United States) Cleveland Indians (Columbus Clippers)
OF	44	Gareth Morgan	April 12, 1996			(United States) Seattle Mariners (Peoria Chiefs)
P	29	Jared Mortensen	June 1, 1988			(United States) Tampa Bay Rays (Montgomery Biscuits)
OF	13	Tyler O'Neill	June 22, 1995			(United States) Seattle Mariners (Bakersfield Blaze)
IF	4	Pete Orr	June 8, 1979			(United States) Milwaukee Brewers (Colorado Springs Sky Sox)
P	25	Jasvir Rakkar	April 27, 1991			(United States) Chicago Cubs (Myrtle Beach Pelicans)
P	48	Scott Richmond	August 30, 1979			(United States) Wichita Wingnuts
P	49	Ethan Stewart	January 19, 1991			(United States) Philadelphia Phillies (Clearwater Threshers)
IF	7	Skyler Stromsmoe	March 30, 1984			(United States) San Francisco Giants (Sacramento River Cats)
OF	23	Rene Tosoni	July 2, 1986			(United States) Sioux City Explorers

=== Puerto Rico ===
Manager: Edwin Rodríguez

Pos.	No.	Player	Date of birth (age)	Bats	Throws	Club

=== Italy ===
Manager: Marco Mazzieri

Pos.	No.	Player	Date of birth (age)	Bats	Throws	Club
P	42	Roberto Corrandi	September 23, 1978 (aged 37)			(Italy) Rimini Baseball
P	30	Ludovico Coveri	March 6, 1997 (aged 18)			T&A San Marino
P	19	Filippo Crepaldi	February 19, 1992 (aged 23)			(Italy) UnipolSai Bologna
P	21	Gianny Fracchiolla	September 10, 1991 (aged 24)			(Germany) Regensburg Legionaere
P	47	Luis Lugo	March 5, 1994 (aged 21)			(United States) Cleveland Indians (Lynchburg Hillcats)
P	17	Alessandro Maestri	June 1, 1985 (aged 30)			(Japan) Orix Buffaloes
P	29	Trey Nielsen	September 1, 1991 (aged 24)			(United States) St. Louis Cardinals (Palm Beach Cardinals)
P	38	Orlando Oberto	December 30, 1980 (aged 34)			T&A San Marino
P	34	Luca Panerati	December 2, 1989 (aged 25)			(Italy) UnipolSai Bologna
P	41	Andrea Pizziconi	October 4, 1991 (aged 24)			T&A San Marino
P	36	Carlos Richetti	August 23, 1983 (aged 32)			(Italy) Rimini Baseball
P	14	Yomel Rivera	September 19, 1989 (aged 26)			(Italy) Lino's Coffee Parma
P	26	Carlos Teran	March 18, 1990 (aged 25)			T&A San Marino
C	2	Riccardo Bertagnon	October 2, 1984 (aged 31)			(Italy) Rimini Baseball
C	31	Alberto Mineo	July 23, 1994 (aged 21)			(United States) Chicago Cubs (Eugene Emeralds)
IF	25	Erick Epifano	March 31, 1991 (aged 24)			(Italy) Tommasin Padova
IF	35	Renato Imperiali	May 23, 1988 (aged 27)			(Italy) Nettuno Baseball
IF	6	Juan Carlos Infante	October 8, 1981 (aged 34)			(Italy) UnipolSai Bologna
IF	11	Freddy Noguera	January 10, 1991 (aged 24)			(Italy) Lino's Coffee Parma
IF	39	Alex Sambucci	September 19, 1989 (aged 26)			(Italy) UnipolSai Bologna
IF	1	Alessandro Vaglio	January 28, 1989 (aged 26)			(Italy) UnipolSai Bologna
OF	51	Paolino Ambrosino	February 17, 1989 (aged 26)			(Italy) UnipolSai Bologna
OF	28	Federico Celli	February 15, 1995 (aged 20)			(United States) Los Angeles Dodgers (Great Lakes Loons)
OF	4	Stefano Desimoni	April 12, 1988 (aged 27)			(Italy) Rimini Baseball
OF	12	Mattia Reginato	May 18, 1990 (aged 25)			(Italy) Nettuno 2
OF	10	Ennio Retrosi	June 26, 1988 (aged 27)			(Italy) Nettuno Baseball
OF	45	Mario Chiarini	January 7, 1981 (aged 34)			T&A San Marino
P	37	Nicholas Morreale	April 8, 1988 (aged 27)			T&A San Marino

== Group B ==
=== Japan ===
Manager: Hiroki Kokubo

Pos.	No.	Player	Date of birth (age)	Bats	Throws	Club
P	10	Yuki Matsui	October 30, 1995 (aged 20)			(Japan) Tohoku Rakuten Golden Eagles
P	11	Tomoyuki Sugano	October 11, 1989 (aged 26)			(Japan) Yomiuri Giants
P	14	Takahiro Norimoto	December 17, 1990 (aged 24)			(Japan) Tohoku Rakuten Golden Eagles
P	15	Hirokazu Sawamura	April 4, 1988 (aged 27)			(Japan) Yomiuri Giants
P	16	Shohei Ohtani	July 5, 1994 (aged 21)			(Japan) Hokkaido Nippon-Ham Fighters
P	29	Yasuhiro Ogawa	May 16, 1990 (aged 25)			(Japan) Tokyo Yakult Swallows
P	18	Kenta Maeda	April 11, 1988 (aged 27)			(Japan) Hiroshima Carp
P	19	Hirotoshi Masui	June 26, 1984 (aged 31)			(Japan) Hokkaido Nippon-Ham Fighters
P	21	Yuki Nishi	November 10, 1990 (aged 24)			(Japan) Orix Buffaloes
P	22	Yudai Ono	September 26, 1988 (aged 27)			(Japan) Chunichi Dragons
P	24	Yasuaki Yamasaki	October 2, 1992 (aged 23)			(Japan) Yokohama DeNA BayStars
P	30	Shota Takeda	April 3, 1993 (aged 22)			(Japan) Fukuoka SoftBank Hawks
P	35	Kazuhisa Makita	November 10, 1984 (aged 30)			(Japan) Saitama Seibu Lions
C	27	Ginjiro Sumitani	July 19, 1987 (aged 28)			(Japan) Saitama Seibu Lions
C	37	Motohiro Shima	December 13, 1984 (aged 30)			(Japan) Tohoku Rakuten Golden Eagles
C	52	Yuhei Nakamura	June 17, 1990 (aged 25)			(Japan) Tokyo Yakult Swallows
IF	3	Nobuhiro Matsuda	May 17, 1983 (aged 32)			(Japan) Fukuoka SoftBank Hawks
IF	5	Shingo Kawabata	October 16, 1987 (aged 28)			(Japan) Tokyo Yakult Swallows
IF	6	Hayato Sakamoto	December 14, 1988 (aged 26)			(Japan) Yomiuri Giants
IF	9	Takuya Nakashima	January 11, 1991 (aged 24)			(Japan) Hokkaido Nippon-Ham Fighters
IF	13	Sho Nakata	April 22, 1989 (aged 26)			(Japan) Hokkaido Nippon-Ham Fighters
IF	23	Tetsuto Yamada	July 16, 1992 (aged 23)			(Japan) Tokyo Yakult Swallows
IF	60	Takeya Nakamura	August 15, 1983 (aged 32)			(Japan) Saitama Seibu Lions
OF	7	Akira Nakamura	November 5, 1989 (aged 26)			(Japan) Fukuoka SoftBank Hawks
OF	8	Ryosuke Hirata	March 23, 1988 (aged 27)			(Japan) Chunichi Dragons
OF	25	Yoshitomo Tsutsugo	November 26, 1991 (aged 23)			(Japan) Yokohama DeNA BayStars
OF	55	Shogo Akiyama	April 16, 1988 (aged 27)			(Japan) Saitama Seibu Lions

=== United States ===
Manager: Willie Randolph

Pos.	No.	Player	Date of birth (age)	Bats	Throws	Club
P	22	Jake Barrett	June 22, 1991			(United States) Arizona Diamondbacks (Reno Aces)
P	37	John Church	April 11, 1986			(United States) New York Mets (Las Vegas 51s)
P	5	Casey Coleman	July 3, 1987			(United States) Kansas City Royals (Omaha Storm Chasers)
P	24	Joey DeNato	March 17, 1992			(United States) Philadelphia Phillies (Lakewood BlueClaws)
P	36	Dana Eveland	October 29, 1983			(United States) Baltimore Orioles (Norfolk Tides)
P	50	Cody Forsythe	September 17, 1990			(United States) Philadelphia Phillies (Clearwater Threshers)
P	34	Jarrett Grube	May 11, 1981			(United States) Cleveland Indians (Columbus Clippers)
P	25	Aaron Laffey	April 15, 1985			(United States) Colorado Rockies (Albuquerque Isotopes)
P	35	Brooks Pounders	September 26, 1990			(United States) Kansas City Royals (Northwest Arkansas Naturals)
P	55	Cody Satterwhite	January 27, 1987			(United States) New York Mets (Las Vegas 51s)
P	40	Zack Segovia	April 11, 1983			(United States) San Diego Padres (El Paso Chihuahuas)
P	17	Seth Simmons	June 14, 1988			(United States) Arizona Diamondbacks (Reno Aces)
P	18	Zeke Spruill	September 11, 1989			(United States) Boston Red Sox (Pawtucket Red Sox)
P	15	Anthony Vasquez	September 19, 1986			(United States) Philadelphia Phillies (Lehigh Valley IronPigs)
P	14	J. B. Wendelken	March 24, 1993			(United States) Chicago White Sox (Charlotte Knights)
P	31	Aaron Wilkerson	May 24, 1989			(United States) Boston Red Sox (Portland Sea Dogs)
C	21	Parker Morin	February 7, 1991			(United States) Kansas City Royals (Northwest Arkansas Naturals)
C	17	Dan Rohlfing	December 2, 1989			(United States) New York Mets (Las Vegas 51s)
OF	9	Brett Eibner	February 12, 1988			(United States) Kansas City Royals (Omaha Storm Chasers)
OF	3	Jacob May	January 23, 1992			(United States) Chicago White Sox (Birmingham Barons)
OF	19	Matt McBride	May 23, 1985			(United States) Colorado Rockies
OF	6	Brett Phillips	May 30, 1994			(United States) Milwaukee Brewers (Biloxi Shuckers)
IF	44	Dan Black	February 7, 1987			(South Korea) KT Wiz
IF	2	Adam Frazier	December 14, 1991			(United States) Pittsburgh Pirates (Altoona Curve)
IF	27	Kyle Martin	November 13, 1992			(United States) Philadelphia Phillies (Lakewood BlueClaws)
IF	8	Tyler Pastornicky	December 13, 1989			(United States) Philadelphia Phillies (Lehigh Valley IronPigs)
IF	7	Joe Sclafani	April 22, 1990			(United States) Houston Astros (Fresno Grizzlies)
IF	4	Elliot Soto	August 21, 1989			(United States) Miami Marlins (Jacksonville Suns)

=== Dominican Republic ===
Manager: Miguel Tejada

Pos.	No.	Player	Date of birth (age)	Bats	Throws	Club
P	32	Daniel Cabrera	May 28, 1981 (aged 34)			(Mexico) Tigres de Quintana Roo
P	10	Danilo de Jesús	November 2, 1987 (aged 28)			(Japan) Hiroshima Toyo Carp (Western League)
P	17	Luis de la Cruz	June 15, 1981 (aged 34)			
P	42	Julio DePaula	December 31, 1982 (aged 32)			(Mexico) Rieleros de Aguascalientes
P	29	Miguel Fermin	February 11, 1985 (aged 30)			
P	45	Victor Mateo	July 27, 1989 (aged 26)			(United States) Atlanta Braves (Gwinnett Braves)
P	39	Juan Morillo	November 5, 1983 (aged 32)			
P	37	Joel Payamps	April 7, 1994 (aged 21)			
P	47	Luis Pérez	January 20, 1985 (aged 30)			(Canada) Toronto Blue Jays (Buffalo Bisons)
P	49	Bryan Rodríguez	June 6, 1991 (aged 24)			(United States) San Diego Padres (San Antonio Missions)
P	48	Francisco Rondon	April 19, 1988 (aged 27)			(United States) Atlanta Braves (Mississippi Braves)
P	51	Onassis Sirrett	December 15, 1988 (aged 26)			
P	30	Dionis Soriano	December 30, 1992 (aged 22)			(Mexico) Guerreros de Oaxaca
C	43	Mario Mercedes	November 22, 1986 (aged 28)			
C	21	Miguel Olivo	July 15, 1978 (aged 37)			(Mexico) Toros de Tijuana
OF	28	Yeicok Calderon	December 23, 1991 (aged 23)			(United States) York Revolution
OF	15	Teoscar Hernández	October 15, 1992 (aged 23)			(United States) Houston Astros (Corpus Christi Hooks)
OF	35	Ayendy Pérez	September 10, 1993 (aged 22)			(United States) Los Angeles Angels (Burlington Bees)
OF	33	Wilkin Ramírez	October 25, 1985 (aged 30)			(United States) Minnesota Twins (Rochester Red Wings)
OF	1	Aneury Tavarez	April 14, 1992 (aged 23)			(United States) Boston Red Sox (Pawtucket Red Sox)
IF	24	Wilson Betemit	November 2, 1981 (aged 34)			
IF	44	Robinzon Díaz	September 19, 1983 (aged 32)			(United States) Milwaukee Brewers (Colorado Springs Sky Sox)
IF	19	Anderson Feliz	May 11, 1992 (aged 23)			(United States) Lancaster Barnstormers
IF	7	Pedro Feliz	December 13, 1986 (aged 28)			
IF	23	Jonathan Galvez	January 18, 1991 (aged 24)			(United States) New York Mets (Binghamton Mets)
IF	6	Omar Luna	December 13, 1986 (aged 28)			(United States) Joplin Blasters
IF	11	Ronny Rodríguez	April 17, 1982 (aged 33)			(United States) Cleveland Indians (Akron RubberDucks)
IF	2	Yeixon Ruiz	March 19, 1991 (aged 24)			(United States) New York Mets (St. Lucie Mets)

=== South Korea ===
Manager: Kim In-sik

Pos.	No.	Player	Date of birth (age)	Bats	Throws	Club
P	11	Rhee Dae-eun	March 23, 1989 (aged 26)			(Japan) Chiba Lotte Marines
P	19	Lee Tae-yang	January 28, 1993 (aged 22)			(South Korea) NC Dinos
P	22	Woo Kyu-min	January 21, 1985 (aged 30)			(South Korea) LG Twins
P	23	Cha Woo-chan	May 31, 1987 (aged 28)			(South Korea) Samsung Lions
P	28	Chang Won-jun	July 31, 1985 (aged 30)			(South Korea) Doosan Bears
P	29	Kim Kwang-hyun	July 22, 1988 (aged 27)			(South Korea) SK Wyverns
P	38	Chong Tae-hyon	November 10, 1978 (aged 36)			(South Korea) Lotte Giants
P	42	Cho Sang-woo	September 4, 1994 (aged 21)			(South Korea) Nexen Heroes
P	45	Lim Chang-min	August 25, 1985 (aged 30)			(South Korea) NC Dinos
P	48	Lee Hyun-seung	October 11, 1983 (aged 32)			(South Korea) Doosan Bears
P	55	Sim Chang-min	February 1, 1993 (aged 22)			(South Korea) Samsung Lions
P	57	Jung Woo-ram	June 1, 1985 (aged 30)			(South Korea) SK Wyverns
P	67	Cho Mu-geun	September 26, 1991 (aged 24)			(South Korea) KT Wiz
C	25	Yang Eui-ji	June 5, 1987 (aged 28)			(South Korea) Doosan Bears
C	47	Kang Min-ho	August 18, 1985 (aged 30)			(South Korea) Lotte Giants
IF	3	Park Byung-ho	July 10, 1986 (aged 29)			(South Korea) Nexen Heroes
IF	7	Kim Sang-su	March 23, 1990 (aged 25)			(South Korea) Samsung Lions
IF	8	Jeong Keun-woo	October 2, 1982 (aged 33)			(South Korea) Hanwha Eagles
IF	10	Lee Dae-ho	June 21, 1982 (aged 33)			(Japan) Fukuoka SoftBank Hawks
IF	14	Hur Kyoung-min	August 26, 1990 (aged 25)			(South Korea) Doosan Bears
IF	16	Hwang Jae-gyun	July 28, 1987 (aged 28)			(South Korea) Lotte Giants
IF	24	Oh Jae-won	February 9, 1985 (aged 30)			(South Korea) Doosan Bears
IF	52	Kim Jae-ho	March 21, 1985 (aged 30)			(South Korea) Doosan Bears
OF	15	Lee Yong-kyu	August 26, 1985 (aged 30)			(South Korea) Hanwha Eagles
OF	17	Na Sung-bum	October 3, 1989 (aged 26)			(South Korea) NC Dinos
OF	31	Son Ah-seop	March 18, 1988 (aged 27)			(South Korea) Lotte Giants
OF	49	Min Byung-hun	March 10, 1987 (aged 28)			(South Korea) Doosan Bears
OF	50	Kim Hyun-soo	January 12, 1988 (aged 27)			(South Korea) Doosan Bears

=== Venezuela ===
Manager: Luis Sojo

Pos.	No.	Player	Date of birth (age)	Bats	Throws	Club
P	1	Felipe Paulino	October 5, 1983 (aged 32)			KK Swings
P	2	Yorman Bazardo	July 11, 1984 (aged 31)			(Venezuela) Azpilicueta FC
P	5	Dirimo Chavez	August 10, 1983 (aged 32)			Free agent
P	15	Carlos Monasterios	March 21, 1986 (aged 29)			(Venezuela) Navegantes del Magallanes
P	16	Yosue Castellano	January 13, 1992 (aged 23)			Free agent
P	19	Jhonny Caraballo	August 23, 1985 (aged 30)			Free agent
P	21	Jesús Martínez	December 4, 1986 (aged 28)			(Venezuela) Navegantes del Magallanes
P	22	Pedro Guerra	January 9, 1990 (aged 25)			(Venezuela) Navegantes del Magallanes
P	24	Fernando Nieve	July 15, 1982 (aged 33)			(Venezuela) Leones del Caracas
P	27	Robert Palencia	January 9, 1986 (aged 29)			Free agent
P	28	Yoel Hernández	April 15, 1980 (aged 35)			(Venezuela) Leones del Caracas
P	33	Freddy García	October 6, 1976 (aged 39)			(Venezuela) Tigres de Aragua
P	35	Josmar Carreño	August 13, 1987 (aged 28)			Free agent
P	36	Gabriel Alfaro	June 14, 1983 (aged 32)			(Venezuela) Navegantes del Magallanes
C	23	Jonathan Jaspe	April 11, 1985 (aged 30)			Free agent
C	25	José Yépez	June 19, 1989 (aged 26)			(Venezuela) Cardenales de Lara
C	26	Juan Apodaca	July 15, 1986 (aged 29)			(Venezuela) Navegantes del Magallanes
IF	4	Ray Olmedo	May 31, 1981 (aged 34)			(Venezuela) Águilas del Zulia
IF	10	Mario Martínez	November 13, 1989 (aged 25)			(Venezuela) Bravos de Margarita
IF	29	Luis Jiménez	May 7, 1982 (aged 33)			(Mexico) Diablos Rojos del México
IF	31	Gregorio Petit	October 12, 1984 (aged 31)			Free agent
IF	34	Renny Osuna	April 24, 1985 (aged 30)			(Venezuela) Navegantes del Magallanes
OF	6	Yonathan Sivira	January 25, 1984 (aged 31)			Free agent
OF	7	Delio Martínez	February 20, 1983 (aged 32)			Free agent
OF	9	Frank Díaz	October 6, 1983 (aged 32)			(Venezuela) Navegantes del Magallanes
OF	17	Francisco Caraballo	October 21, 1983 (aged 32)			(Venezuela) Tigres de Aragua
OF	18	Douglas Landaeta	November 25, 1988 (aged 26)			Free agent
OF	50	Juan Rivera	July 3, 1978 (aged 37)			(South Korea) Doosan Bears

=== Mexico ===
Manager: Mike Brito

Pos.	No.	Player	Date of birth (age)	Bats	Throws	Club
