= Crepaldi =

Crepaldi is an Italian surname. Notable people with the surname include:

- Filippo Crepaldi (born 1992), Italian baseball player
- Giampaolo Crepaldi (born 1947), Italian Roman Catholic bishop
- Gianni Crepaldi (born 1968), Italian male long-distance runner
- Mirko Crepaldi (1972–2019), Italian racing cyclist
- Ottavio Crepaldi (born 1945), Italian racing cyclist
