= Aaron Wilkerson =

American baseball player (born 1989)

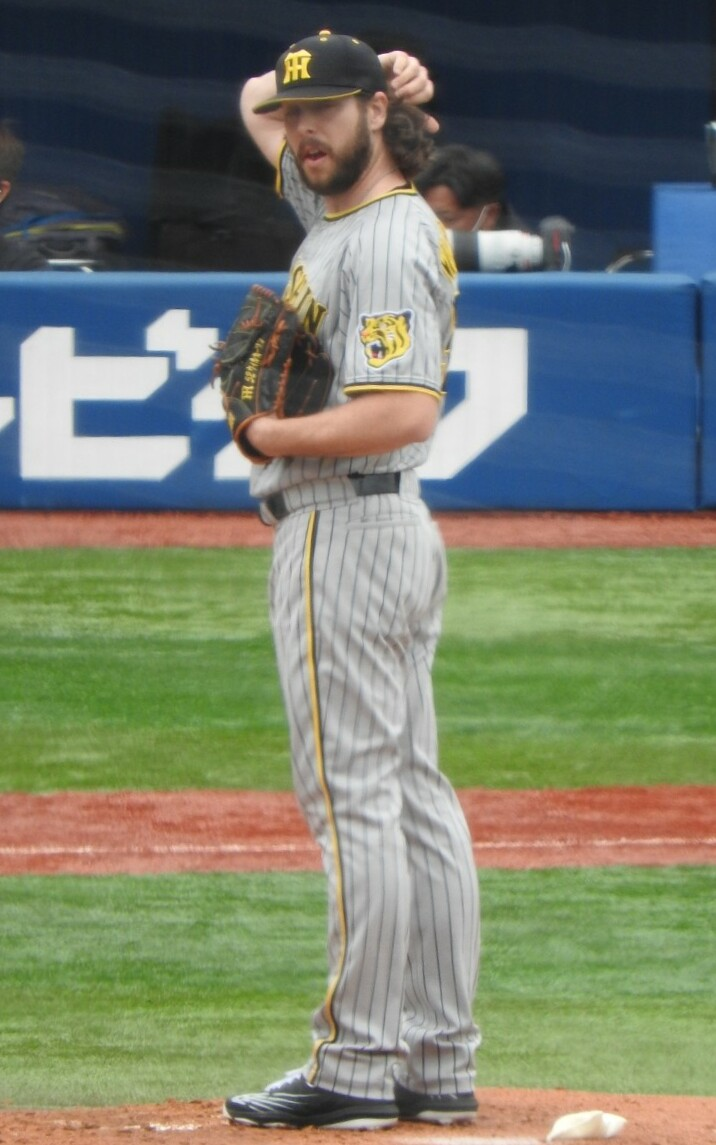
- Wilkerson with the Hanshin Tigers

Free agent
- Pitcher
- Born: May 24, 1989 (age 37); Fort Worth, Texas, U.S.
- Bats: Right Throws: Right

Professional debut
- MLB: September 15, 2017, for the Milwaukee Brewers
- NPB: April 16, 2022, for the Hanshin Tigers
- KBO: July 26, 2023, for the Lotte Giants
- CPBL: March 29, 2026, for the Fubon Guardians

MLB statistics (through 2019 season)
- Win–loss record: 1–1
- Earned run average: 6.88
- Strikeouts: 28

NPB statistics (through 2022 season)
- Win–loss record: 5–5
- Earned run average: 4.08
- Strikeouts: 54

KBO statistics (through 2024 season)
- Win–loss record: 19–10
- Earned run average: 3.39
- Strikeouts: 248

CPBL statistics (through 2026 season)
- Win–loss record: 2-4
- Earned run average: 4.24
- Strikeouts: 24
- Stats at Baseball Reference

Teams
- Milwaukee Brewers (2017–2019); Hanshin Tigers (2022); Lotte Giants (2023–2024); Fubon Guardians (2026)
Medals
Men's baseball
Representing United States
WBSC Premier12
Silver medal – second place	2015 Tokyo	Team

Aaron Daniel Wilkerson (born May 24, 1989) is an American professional baseball pitcher who is a free agent. He has previously played in Major League Baseball (MLB) for the Milwaukee Brewers, in Nippon Professional Baseball (NPB) for the Hanshin Tigers, and in the KBO League for the Lotte Giants and in the Chinese Professional Baseball League (CPBL) for the Fubon Guardians.

After breaking two pitching records in the National Association of Intercollegiate Athletics for Cumberland University, Wilkerson overcame Tommy John surgery, and four independent league trades in a single season, to join the Boston Red Sox organization. The Red Sox traded him to the Brewers in 2016.

Although he features a four-pitch mix, including a curveball, slider, and changeup, Wilkerson throws the secondary pitches sparingly in comparison to his fastball, which usually sits 91–93 mph and tops out at 95 mph, according to a Red Sox scouting report.

On April 17, 2019, Wilkerson recorded his first MLB hit and home run in the same at bat, hitting a two-run home run off Michael Wacha.

== Amateur career ==
Wilkerson attended Midway High School in Waco, Texas. He enrolled at Panola College. In 2008 posted a 3-1 win- loss record in 57 innings pitched with 62 strikeouts. He was NJCAA D1 leader in saves with 12. As a Sophomore he posted a 9-3 win- loss record with a 3.10 era in 78 innings pitched with 103 strikeouts. Then transferred to Cumberland University, where he played college baseball for the Cumberland Bulldogs. With Cumberland, he won a National Association of Intercollegiate Athletics (NAIA) World Series championship in 2010. Wilkerson posted a 14–1 win–loss record with 14 consecutive victories, 11 complete games, and a team-best 2.13 earned run average (ERA) in 101 1/3 innings pitched, while leading the nation with 125 strikeouts and being named both a Second Team All-American and the NAIA World Series All-Tournament Team.

As a senior in 2011, Wilkerson set an NAIA record by pitching 54 consecutive scoreless innings streak from February 9 to April 8. He finished that season with a 12–0 undefeated mark and a 1.49 ERA, closing his college career by setting other NAIA record while winning 26 straight decisions. Besides, he earned First Team All-American honors and was named TranSouth Conference Pitcher of the Week three times.

Doctors revealed that Wilkerson had pitched that season with a frayed ulnar collateral ligament in his right elbow. As a result, he underwent Tommy John surgery went undrafted out of Cumberland in 2011. He left baseball for two years while stocking frozen food shelves.

== Professional career ==
=== Fort Worth Cats ===
Wilkerson started his professional career in 2013 with the Fort Worth Cats in the independent United League Baseball. At the time, Wilkerson had to rebuild his mechanics completely with the help of his Fort Worth pitching coach and a private instructor introduced to him by his brother. He had a 9–1 record and a 2.74 ERA in 13 games.

=== Florence Freedom/Grand Prairie AirHogs ===
He then was traded to the Florence Freedom of the Frontier League in the midseason, and finished the year with the Grand Prairie AirHogs of the American Association. Overall, he went 10–2 with a 2.96 ERA in 19 starts in the three leagues.

=== Boston Red Sox ===
In 2014, Wilkerson was 3–1 with a 3.35 ERA in 13 games for Grand Prairie, before joining the Boston Red Sox organization when his contract was purchased from the AirHogs in August. After that, he went 5–1 with a 1.62 ERA in eight starts at Low–A Lowell Spinners.

After that, Wilkerson posted a 7–2 record with a 2.96 ERA, 1.05 walks plus hits per inning pitched (WHIP) ratio and .218 batting average against in 17 outings (12 starts) for High-A Salem Red Sox in 2015. He then went 4–1 with a 2.66 ERA, 1.01 WHIP and .192 BAA in seven starts for Double-A Portland Sea Dogs. Wilkerson followed with a brief stint in the Arizona Fall League, as the starter sent to the Scottsdale Scorpions from the Red Sox, but he had to left the Scorpions to pitch for the USA squad in the inaugural World Baseball Softball Confederation Premier12 Tournament held in Taiwan and Japan in November 2015.

In 2016, Wilkerson appeared in eight games for Portland, posting a 2–1 record with a 2.12 ERA and .175 BAA, striking out 48 batters while walking 14 in 44 1/3 innings. He then gained a promotion to Triple-A Pawtucket Red Sox in late April. In 41 innings across eight Pawtucket appearances, Wilkerson went 4–1 with a 2.20 ERA, 1.07 WHIP, .222 BAA, 49 strikeouts, and 10 walks.

=== Milwaukee Brewers ===
On July 7, 2016, the Red Sox traded Wilkerson and Wendell Rijo to the Milwaukee Brewers in exchange for Aaron Hill. He spent the rest of the 2016 season with the Triple-A Colorado Springs Sky Sox. In 2017, he began the season with the Double-A Biloxi Shuckers. On September 15, 2017, Wilkerson was added to the Brewers' 40-man roster.

In 3 major league games for the Brewers in 2018, Wilkerson allowed 10 earned runs in 9 innings, spending the majority of the year in Triple-A with the Colorado Springs Sky Sox. On April 17, 2019, Wilkerson recorded his first MLB hit and home run in the same at bat hitting a two-run home run off Michael Wacha. On September 1, Wilkerson was designated for assignment after allowing 13 runs in 16 innings across 8 appearances in 2019. Wilkerson did not play in a game in 2020 due to the cancellation of the Minor League Baseball season because of the COVID-19 pandemic. He became a free agent on November 2, 2020.

On December 17, 2020, Wilkerson signed with the Rakuten Monkeys of the Chinese Professional Baseball League. However, he opted out of his contract prior to the season due to family reasons.

=== Los Angeles Dodgers ===
On May 1, 2021, Wilkerson signed a minor league contract with the Los Angeles Dodgers organization. He appeared in 23 games (19 starts) for the Triple-A Oklahoma City Dodgers and was 8–5 with a 3.86 ERA with 125 strikeouts over 112 innings of work. Wilkerson elected free agency following the season on November 7.

=== Hanshin Tigers ===
On December 7, 2021, Wilkerson signed with the Hanshin Tigers of Nippon Professional Baseball. Wilkerson made 14 appearances for Hanshin, pitching to a 5–5 record and 4.08 ERA with 54 strikeouts across 70 2/3 innings of work. He became a free agent following the 2022 season.

On February 21, 2023, Wilkerson signed with the Leones de Yucatán of the Mexican League. However, he was released by the team prior to the start of the season.

=== Oakland Athletics ===
On April 22, 2023, Wilkerson signed a minor league contract with the Oakland Athletics organization. In 14 games for the Triple–A Las Vegas Aviators, he struggled to a 6.51 ERA with 53 strikeouts in 47 innings of work. On July 14, Wilkerson opted out of his minor league contract and became a free agent.

=== Lotte Giants ===
On July 18, 2023, Wilkerson signed a $350,000 contract with the Lotte Giants of the KBO League. In 13 starts for Lotte, he pitched to a 7–2 record and 2.26 ERA with 81 strikeouts across 79 2/3 innings of work.

On November 15, 2023, the Giants re–signed Wilkerson to a one–year, $750K contract. In 32 starts for Lotte in 2024, he pitched to a 12–8 record and 3.84 ERA with 167 strikeouts across 196 2/3 innings of work. Wilkerson became a free agent following the season.

=== Cincinnati Reds ===
On January 27, 2025, Wilkerson signed a minor league contract with the Cincinnati Reds. In 18 starts for the Triple-A Louisville Bats, he logged a 4-2 record and 4.17 ERA with 78 strikeouts over 95 innings of work. Wilkerson was released by the Reds organization on July 17.

=== St. Louis Cardinals ===
On July 18, 2025, Wilkerson signed a minor league contract with the St. Louis Cardinals. He made 11 starts for the Triple-A Memphis Redbirds, compiling a 3-1 record and 3.43 ERA with 40 strikeouts across 57 2/3 innings pitched. Wilkerson elected free agency following the season on November 6.

=== Fubon Guardians ===
On December 30, 2025, Wilkerson signed with the Fubon Guardians of the Chinese Professional Baseball League (CPBL). He was released on August 24, 2026.
