= Bryan Rodriguez =

Bryan Rodriguez may refer to:

- Bryan Rodríguez (footballer) (born 1996), Costa Rican-born Nicaraguan footballer
- Bryan Rodriguez (baseball) (born 1991), baseball player

== See also ==
- Brian Rodríguez (born 2000), Uruguayan footballer
- Braian Rodríguez (born 1986), Uruguayan footballer
