= Seth Simmons =

American baseball pitcher

Free agent
- Pitcher
- Born: June 14, 1988 (age 36); Winston-Salem, North Carolina, U.S.
- Bats: Right Throws: Right
Medals
Men's baseball
Representing United States
WBSC Premier12
| Silver medal – second place | 2015 Tokyo | Team |

Seth Tyler Simmons (born June 14, 1988) is an American professional baseball pitcher who is a free agent. He played for the United States national baseball team at the 2015 WBSC Premier12.

== Career ==
=== Amateur ===
Simmons is from Lewisville, North Carolina. He graduated from Cavalry Baptist Day School in Winston-Salem, North Carolina, and attended East Carolina University, where he pitched for the East Carolina Pirates for four years. He served as the Pirates' closer. As a senior, Simmons had a 2.78 earned run average (ERA) with 50 strikeouts in 35 2/3 innings pitched. In 2009, he played collegiate summer baseball with the Yarmouth–Dennis Red Sox of the Cape Cod Baseball League.

=== Arizona Diamondbacks ===
The Arizona Diamondbacks selected Simmons in the 40th round of the 2011 Major League Baseball draft. In 2013, Simmons pitched for Visalia, and had a 2.44 ERA in 73 2/3 innings. The Diamondbacks invited Simmons to spring training in 2014.

Simmons was named to the United States national baseball team for the 2015 WBSC Premier12.

=== San Diego Padres ===
Released by the Diamondbacks in 2016, he signed with the San Diego Padres, and was assigned to the San Antonio Missions of the Double–A Texas League.

Simmons split the 2018 season between Double–A San Antonio and the Triple–A El Paso Chihuahuas, making 18 appearances and accumulating a 3.81 ERA with 36 strikeouts across 54 1/3 innings pitched. He became a free agent following the season on November 2, 2018.

=== High Point Rockers ===
In early 2019, Simmons signed with the High Point Rockers of the Atlantic League of Professional Baseball.

=== Long Island Ducks ===
On July 12, 2019, Simmons was traded to the Long Island Ducks of the Atlantic League of Professional Baseball. He became a free agent following the season.
