= Lee Tae-yang =

Lee Tae-yang may refer to:

- Lee Tae-yang (baseball, born 1990)
- Lee Tae-yang (baseball, born 1993)
