= Dan Rohlfing =

American baseball player

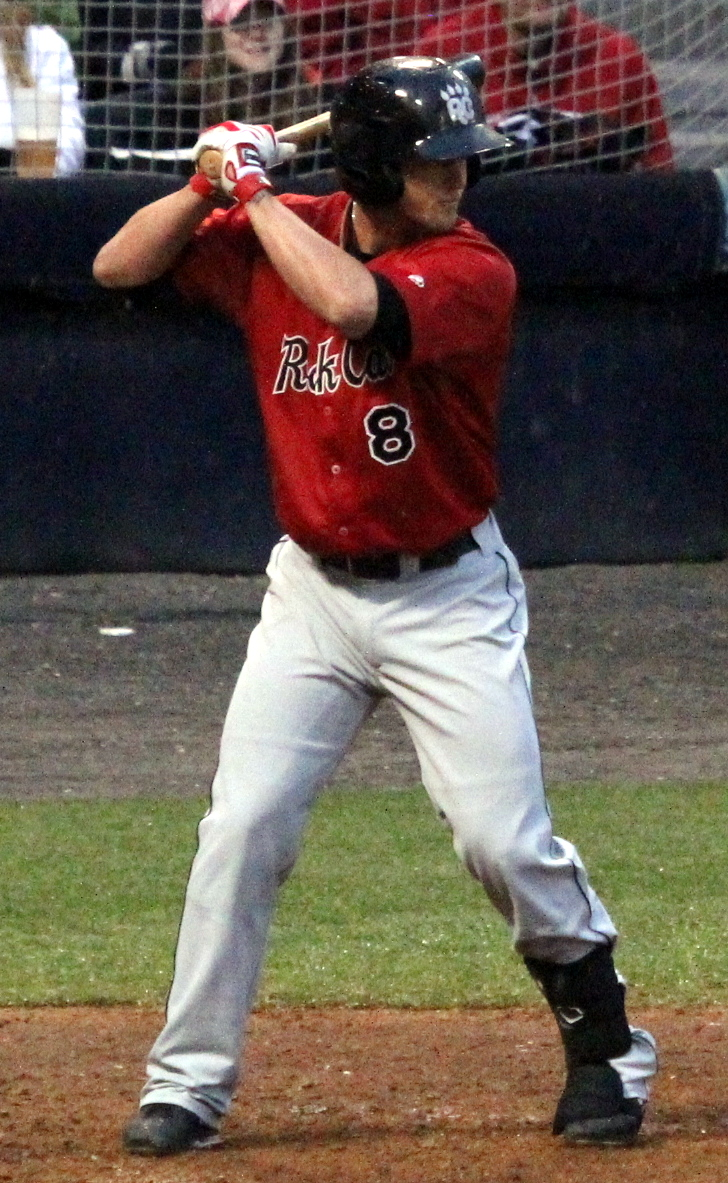
- Rohlfing with the New Britain Rock Cats in 2013
- Catcher
- Born: February 12, 1989 (age 37); St. Louis, Missouri, U.S.
- Bats: Right Throws: Right
- Stats at Baseball Reference
Medals
Men's baseball
Representing United States
WBSC Premier12
Silver medal – second place	2015 Tokyo	Team

Daniel W. Rohlfing (born February 12, 1989) is an American former professional baseball catcher. Prior to beginning his professional career, Rohlfing attended Oakville High School, and was selected by the Minnesota Twins in the 14th round of the 2007 Major League Baseball (MLB) draft.

== Career ==
Rohlfing was born in St. Louis, Missouri and attended Oakville High School in Oakville, Missouri. While attending high school, Rohlfing was named Suburban West Conference Player of the Year, first team All-State, and first team All-Conference as a catcher as a high school senior after batting .486 with three homeruns, 27 RBIs, and a .591 on-base percentage. He was also named first team All-Conference as a junior third baseman after batting .386.

After graduating from high school, the Minnesota Twins selected Rohlfing in the 14th round (452nd overall) of the 2007 MLB draft. After being drafted and signing for $100,000, Rohlfing played in the Gulf Coast League for his first two years. In the 2009 season, he played for the Elizabethton Twins. From 2010 to 2013 he was back and forth between teams in the Twin's minor league system, playing for the New Britain Rock Cats and the Fort Myers Miracle. In 2013, he also spent some time playing with the Rochester Red Wings. In 2014, he was on the spring training roster for the Twins. On December 15, 2014, Rohlfing re-signed with the Twins on a minor league contract. He was assigned to the Rochester Red Wings to begin the 2015 season.

On April 22, 2015, Rohlfing was traded to the New York Mets in exchange for cash considerations. He finished the season with the Las Vegas 51s and elected free agency on November 6, 2015.

On February 10, 2016, Rohlfing signed a minor league contract with the Arizona Diamondbacks organization. On July 28, 2016, while playing for the Triple-A Reno Aces, Rohlfing had his first career two-homer game. On November 7, 2016, Rohlfing elected free agency.

On December 15, 2016, Rohlfing signed a minor league contract with the Minnesota Twins. Rohlfing was assigned to the Chattanooga Lookouts to begin the 2017 season. On July 26, 2017, Rohlfing was released.
