= Sim Chang-min (baseball) =

South Korean baseball player

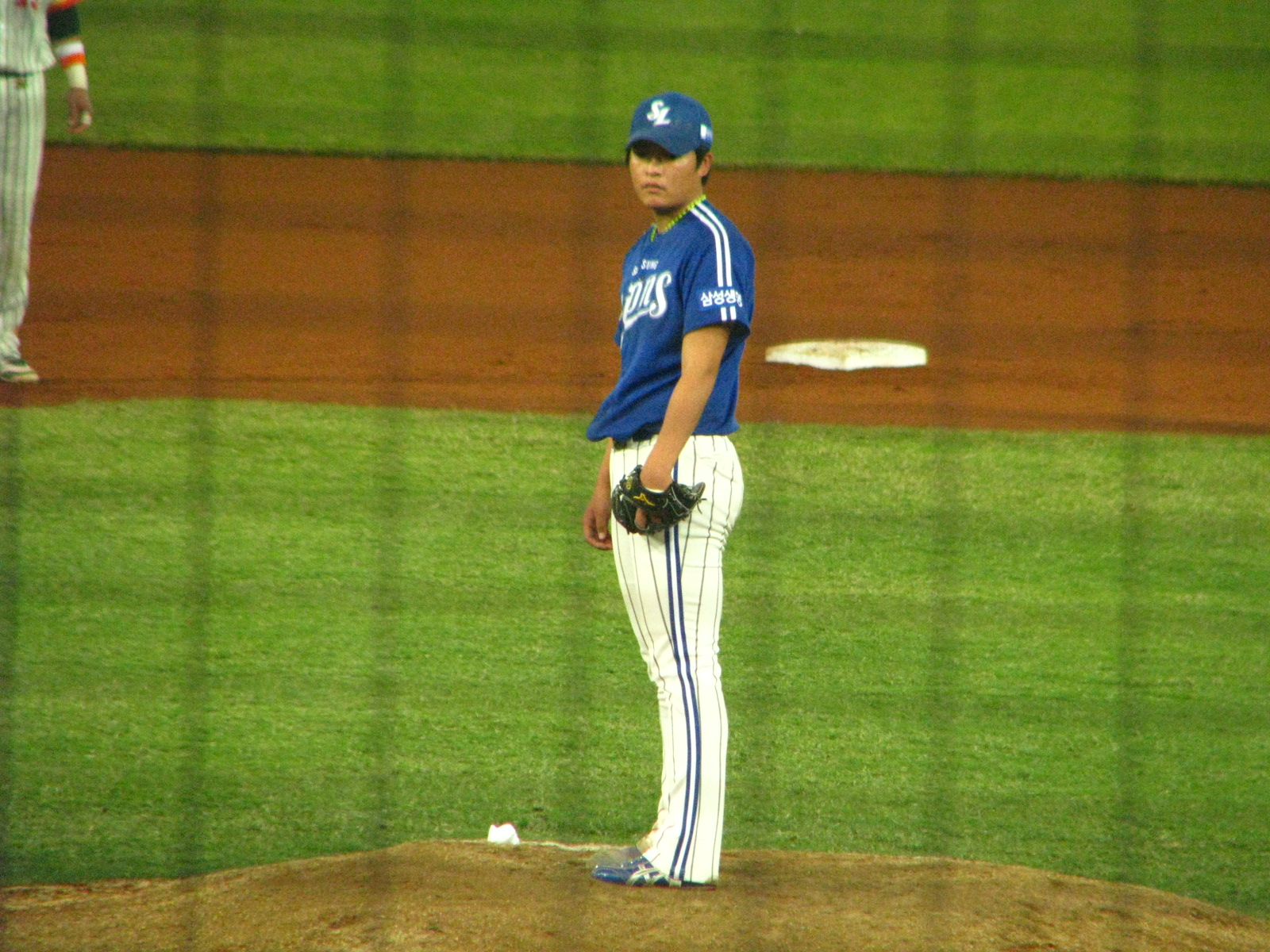

NC Dinos – No. 18
- Relief Pitcher
- Born: February 1, 1993 (age 33); Pohang, North Gyeongsang
- Bats: Right Throws: Right

KBO debut
- April 28, 2012, for the Samsung Lions

KBO statistics (through 2023 season)
- Win–loss record: 31–29
- Earned run average: 4.22
- Strikeouts: 564
- Stats at Baseball Reference

Teams
- Samsung Lions (2012–2021); NC Dinos (2022–present)
Medals
Men's baseball
Representing South Korea
2015 WBSC Premier12
Gold medal – first place	2015 Tokyo	Team

Sim Chang-min (Korean: 심창민; Hanja: 沈昌珉, born February 1, 1993) is a South Korean professional baseball pitcher currently playing for the NC Dinos of the KBO League.
