= Aneury Tavárez =

Dominican baseball player (born 1992)

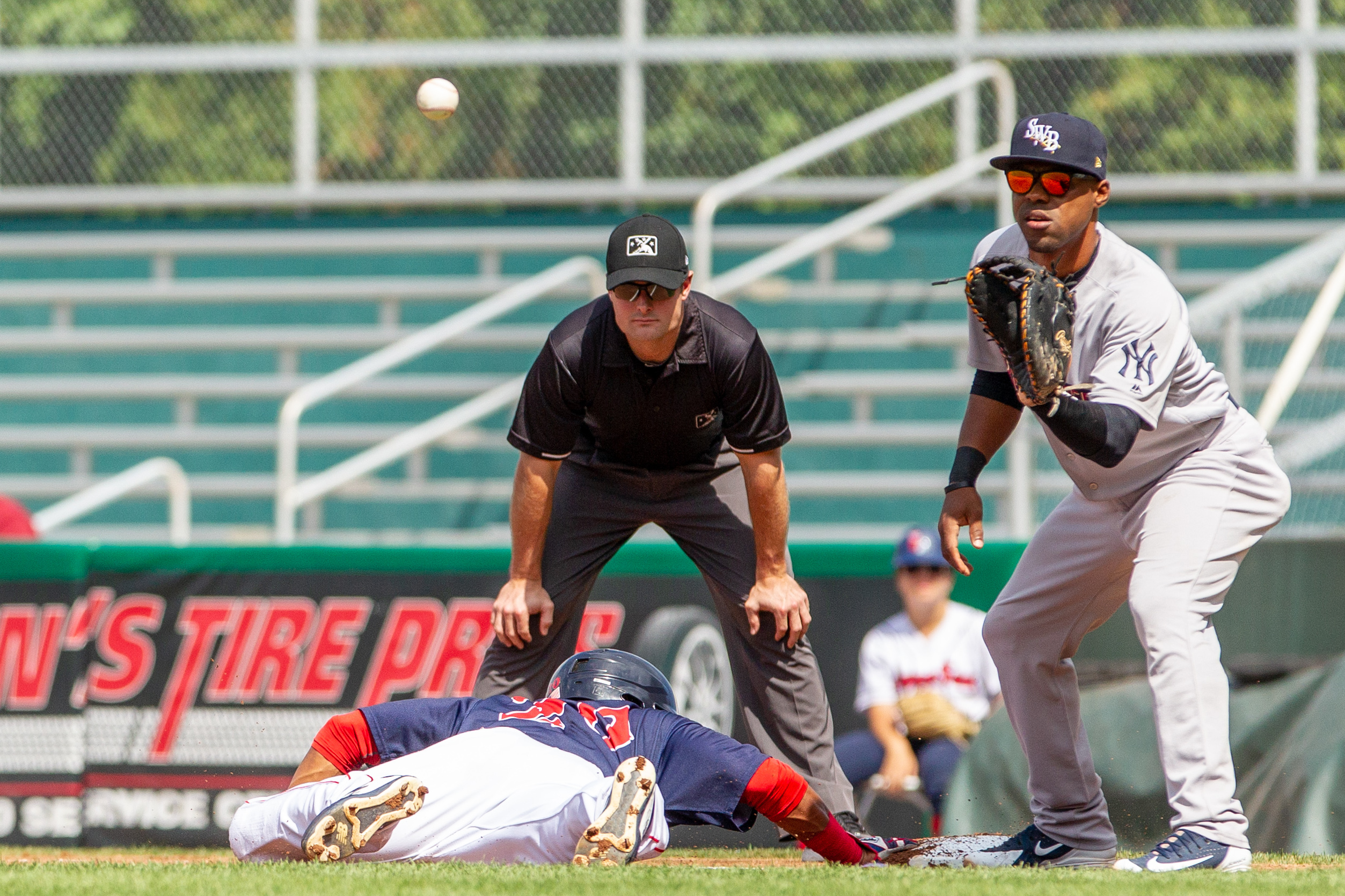

Free agent
- Outfielder
- Born: April 14, 1992 (age 33); Barrio Obrero, Dominican Republic
- Bats: Left Throws: Right
- Stats at Baseball Reference

Aneury De Jesús Tavárez Trinidad [ah-nay'-oo-ree / tah-vah'-rez] (born April 14, 1992) is a Dominican professional baseball outfielder who is a free agent.

== Career ==
=== Boston Red Sox ===
The Boston Red Sox signed Tavárez as an international free agent in October 2010, signing him a bonus of $80,000. His first four seasons in the minors were unremarkable – a combined .254 batting average (289-for-1136) with 336 strikeouts and just 66 walks in 314 games.

Tavárez opened 2015 with the High–A Salem Red Sox, where he improved to .280 with a .444 OBP and .447 of slugging in 39 games. He then was promoted to the Double-A Portland Sea Dogs during the midseason and ended the year with the Triple-A Pawtucket Red Sox. Overall, he posted a .253/.314/.401 slash line with a .715 OPS in 112 games. After the season, he was selected to the roster for the Dominican Republic national baseball team at the 2015 WBSC Premier12.

Tavárez settled into Double-A in 2016, after spending the 2015 season at three levels, and struggled early in the year. As late as May 5, he was hitting .219 with a .534 OPS and was fighting for playing time before settling down in June, when he posted a robust .413 average and was briefly called up to Pawtucket for six games. Tavárez produced again in Triple-A, hitting .389/.522/.667 with a one home run and five RBI, while collecting a 1.188 OPS. Following his return on July 1 to Double-A, Tavárez hit .341 for the Sea Dogs during the month, boost his batting average to .336 in August, and finished the season with a career-high 12-game hitting streak, in which he went 15-for-37 (.405), missing out on the Eastern League batting title by a narrow margin. Binghamton Mets infielder Phillip Evans overtook Tavárez on the last day of the season, edging him .3351 to .3350. Tavárez led the league in triples (13), along with a third-best .379 OBP (.379) and fourth-bests in SLG (.506) and OPS (.886). He also earned Portland Sea Dogs Most Valuable Player honors and was named to both the Eastern League mid-season and season-ending All-Star teams. Adidionally, Tavárez led the Red Sox minor league system in average and triples, ranking third both in slugging and OPS behind Andrew Benintendi (.532/.910) and Yoan Moncada (.511/.918), fifth in OBP, sixth in hits (132), and eighth in stolen bases (20).

On December 8, 2016, Tavárez was selected by the Baltimore Orioles in the Rule 5 draft. He did not play in any regular seasons minor league games for Baltimore. Tavárez was returned to Boston from Baltimore on April 2, 2017. He spent the season with three Red Sox teams: the Low–A Lowell Spinners (7 games), Double-A Portland Sea Dogs (18 games), and Triple-A Pawtucket Red Sox (33 games). Overall, he batted .272 with five home runs and 22 RBI in 58 games played.

Tavárez opened the 2018 season with Triple-A Pawtucket. In 104 games for the club, he batted .226/.284/.343 with 8 home runs, 34 RBI, and 9 stolen bases. Tavárez elected free agency following the season on November 2, 2018.

On January 25, 2019, Tavárez re-signed with the Red Sox on a minor league contract. He made 20 appearances for Double-A Portland, hitting .192/.272/.260 with three RBI and three stolen bases. Tavárez was released by the Red Sox organization on May 10.

=== Generales de Durango ===
On May 27, 2019, Tavárez signed with the Generales de Durango of the Mexican League. He made 70 appearances for the Generales during the remainder of the season, slashing .321/.379/.488 with nine home runs, 27 RBI, and 16 stolen bases. Tavárez did not play in a game in 2020 due to the cancellation of the Mexican League season because of the COVID-19 pandemic.

In 2021, Tavárez slashed .353/.436/.603 with 10 home runs and 36 RBI over 55 games. He continued his success in 2022, batting .388/.466/.659 with 23 home runs and 80 RBI in 85 games, and was named a Mid-Season All Star in the North Division. In 2023, he registered a .263/.332/.425 line in 47 games.

=== Guerreros de Oaxaca ===
On June 26, 2023, Tavárez was traded to the Guerreros de Oaxaca of the Mexican League in exchange for OF Ademar Rifaela. In seven games for Oaxaca, Tavárez went 6–for–25 (.240) with no home runs and two RBI.

=== Bravos de León ===
On December 11, 2023, Tavárez signed with the Bravos de León of the Mexican League. In 45 games for León, Tavárez batted .286/.373/.456 with four home runs and 24 RBI.

=== Toros de Tijuana ===
On June 8, 2024, the Bravos traded Tavárez to the Toros de Tijuana of the Mexican League. In 45 appearances for Tijuana, he batted .311/.348/.466 with four home runs, 33 RBI, and nine stolen bases.

Tavárez made 15 appearances for Tijuana in 2025, and slashed .156/.206/.281 with one home run and four RBI.

=== Conspiradores de Querétaro ===
On June 21, 2025, Tavárez was traded to the Conspiradores de Querétaro of the Mexican League. In 11 appearances for Querétaro, he batted .237/.256/.342 with one home run and five RBI. Tavárez was released by the Conspiradores on July 11.

== See also ==
- Rule 5 draft results
