= Cho Mu-geun =

South Korean baseball player

Lotte Giants – No. 67
- Relief pitcher
- Born: September 26, 1991 (age 34); Daegu
- Bats: Right Throws: Right

KBO debut
- May 2, 2015, for the KT Wiz

KBO statistics (through 2019)
- Win–loss record: 11–5
- Earned run average: 4.46
- Strikeouts: 129
- Holds: 9
- Saves: 4
- Stats at Baseball Reference

Teams
- KT Wiz (2015–2017); Lotte Giants (2018–2019)
Medals
Men's baseball
Representing South Korea
2015 WBSC Premier12
Gold medal – first place	2015 Tokyo	Team

- Cho Mu-geun
- Hangul: 조무근
- Hanja: 趙武根
- RR: Jo Mugeun
- MR: Cho Mugŭn

Former name
- Hangul: 조형준
- RR: Jo Hyeongjun
- MR: Cho Hyŏngjun

Cho Mu-geun (Korean: 조무근; born September 26, 1991) is a South Korean professional baseball pitcher currently playing for the KT Wiz of the KBO League.
