= Luis González (2020s pitcher) =

Dominican baseball player (born 1992)

Long Island Ducks – No. 31
- Pitcher
- Born: January 17, 1992 (age 34); Mao, Dominican Republic
- Bats: Left Throws: Left

NPB debut
- June 20, 2020, for the Chunichi Dragons

NPB statistics (through 2020 season)
- Win–loss record: 0–0
- Earned run average: 4.78
- Strikeouts: 27

Teams
- Chunichi Dragons (2020)

Luis Humberto González (born January 17, 1992) is a Dominican professional baseball pitcher for the Long Island Ducks of the Atlantic League of Professional Baseball. He has previously played in Nippon Professional Baseball (NPB) for the Chunichi Dragons.

== Career ==
=== Philadelphia Phillies ===
On February 12, 2010, González was signed by the Philadelphia Phillies as an international free agent. He made his professional debut with the Dominican Summer League Phillies, and logged a 4.14 ERA with 29 strikeouts in 10 games (9 starts).

In 2011, he pitched in 12 games (7 starts) for the rookie-level Gulf Coast Phillies, registering a 3–2 record and 5.74 ERA with 40 strikeouts in 42 1/3 innings pitched. González spent the 2012 season with the Low-A Williamsport Crosscutters, pitching to a 4.62 ERA with 46 strikeouts in 50 2/3 innings of work. He was released by the Phillies organization on March 16, 2013.

=== Baltimore Orioles ===
On July 18, 2013, González signed a minor league contract with the Baltimore Orioles organization. After signing, he made 9 appearances for the Dominican Summer League Orioles. In 2014, González pitched in 17 games (starting 16) for the Single-A Delmarva Shorebirds, posting a 6-4 record and 4.83 ERA with 72 strikeouts in 76 innings pitched. González would then spend the next three seasons (2015–2017) with the High-A Frederick Keys. In 2015, he went 6-11 with a 6.88 ERA and 91 strikeouts. In 2016, he improved to a 1-2 record and 3.13 ERA with 43 strikeouts. In 2017, he had his best year with the team, registering a 6-2 record and 2.47 ERA with 75 strikeouts and 5 saves.

González began the 2018 season with the Double-A Bowie Baysox, and was named an Eastern League All-Star. He promoted to the Triple-A Norfolk Tides later in the year, where he pitched to a 5.04 ERA in 14 games. González split the 2019 season between Double-A Bowie and Triple-A Norfolk, but struggled to a cumulative 6.89 ERA with 66 strikeouts in 48 1/3 innings pitched across 38 contests. He elected free agency following the season on November 4, 2019.

=== Chunichi Dragons ===
On December 12, 2019, it was announced that González had agreed to one-year deal with the Chunichi Dragons of Nippon Professional Baseball. González appeared in 28 games for Chunichi’s main team, posting a 4.78 ERA with 27 strikeouts in 26 1/3 innings pitched. He became a free agent on December 2, 2020.

=== San Francisco Giants ===
On January 20, 2021, González signed a minor league contract with the San Francisco Giants organization. In 20 games for the Triple-A Sacramento River Cats of the Pacific Coast League, he struggled to a 7.36 ERA with 33 strikeouts in 25 2/3 innings pitched. González was released by the Giants on August 7.

=== Fortitudo Baseball ===
On May 23, 2022, González signed with Fortitudo Baseball of the Italian Baseball League. In 10 games for the team, González worked to an 0-1 record and 2.01 ERA with 40 strikeouts and 8 saves in 22 1/3 innings pitched.

=== Sultanes de Monterrey ===
On April 24, 2023, González signed with the Sultanes de Monterrey of the Mexican League. In 39 appearances out of the bullpen, González recorded a 1.69 ERA with 43 strikeouts in 37 1/3 innings pitched.

=== Baltimore Orioles (second stint) ===
On October 6, 2023, González signed a minor league contract with the Baltimore Orioles organization. He made 44 relief appearances for the Triple–A Norfolk Tides in 2024, compiling a 5–3 record and 4.50 ERA with 71 strikeouts and 2 saves across 60 innings pitched. On November 4, 2024, the Orioles added González to their 40-man roster to prevent him from reaching minor league free agency.

González was optioned to Triple-A Norfolk to begin the 2025 season. In 4 appearances for the Tides, he posted a 1-0 record and 5.79 ERA with 4 strikeouts across 4 2/3 innings pitched. González was designated for assignment by Baltimore following the acquisition of Scott Blewett on April 14, 2025. He was released by the Orioles organization on April 15.

=== Long Island Ducks ===
On August 15, 2026, Gonzalez signed with the Long Island Ducks of the Atlantic League of Professional Baseball.
