= John Church (baseball) =

American baseball player

- Pitcher
- Born: November 4, 1986 (age 39); Winter Haven, Florida, U.S.
- Bats: Right Throws: Right
Medals
Men's baseball
Representing United States
WBSC Premier12
Silver medal – second place	2015 Tokyo	Team

John Michael Church (born November 4, 1986) is an American professional baseball pitcher. He played for the United States national baseball team at the 2015 WBSC Premier12.

Church attended Lake Wales High School in Lake Wales, Florida, and the University of West Florida, where he played college football for the West Florida Argonauts. The New York Mets selected Church in the 23rd round of the 2009 MLB draft. He reached Class AAA, the highest level of Minor League Baseball, in 2013 and 2014. He played for the United States national baseball team in the 2015 WBSC Premier 12.
