= Phillip Evans (baseball) =

American baseball player (born 1992)

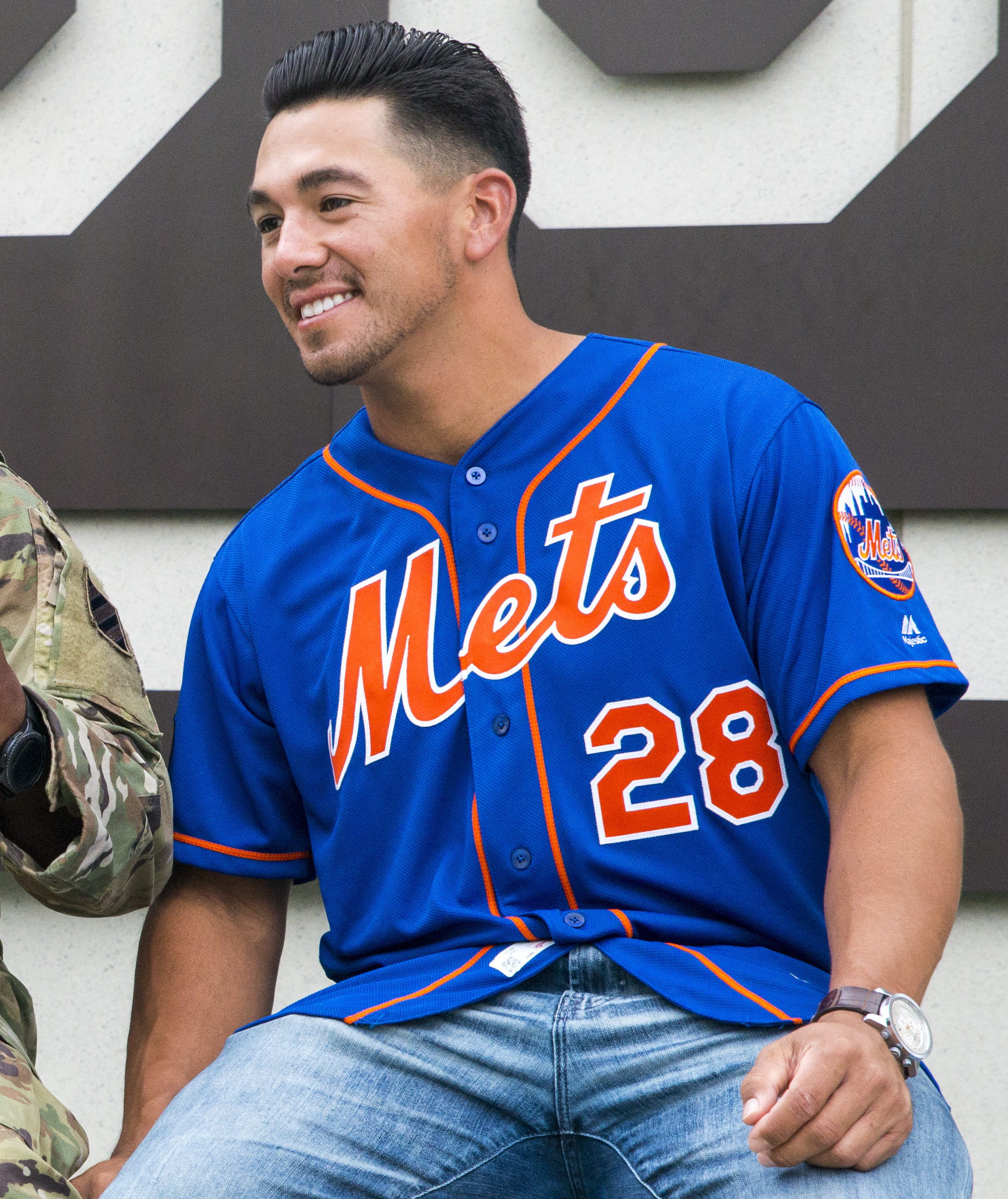
- Evans with the Mets in 2018

Toros de Tijuana – No. 26
- Third baseman / Outfielder
- Born: September 10, 1992 (age 34); Whittier, California, U.S.
- Bats: Right Throws: Right

MLB debut
- September 8, 2017, for the New York Mets

MLB statistics (through 2021 season)
- Batting average: .231
- Home runs: 6
- Runs batted in: 27
- Stats at Baseball Reference

Teams
- New York Mets (2017–2018); Pittsburgh Pirates (2020–2021)
Medals
Men's baseball
Representing Mexico
2019 WBSC Premier12
Bronze medal – third place	2019 Tokyo	National team

Phillip Mathew Evans (born September 10, 1992) is an American professional baseball infielder for the Toros de Tijuana of the Mexican League. He has previously played in Major League Baseball (MLB) for the New York Mets and Pittsburgh Pirates, and has played for the Mexico national baseball team in international competitions.

== Career ==
=== New York Mets ===
The Mets selected Evans in the 15th round of the 2011 MLB draft out of La Costa Canyon High School in Carlsbad, California. Evans had previously committed to play college baseball at San Diego State University before his senior year of high school.

Evans made his professional debut in 2011, but due to signing in late August, played in only nine games in his first professional season. In 2012 he played for the Brooklyn Cyclones where he batted .252 with five home runs and 29 RBIs in 73 games, in 2013 he played for the Savannah Sand Gnats where he posted a .203 batting average with two home runs and 25 RBIs in 106 games, and he spent 2014 with the St. Lucie Mets where he compiled a .247 batting average with four home runs and 39 RBIs in 111 games. Evans spent 2015 back with St. Lucie where he batted .234 with 32 RBIs in 77 games.

2016 was Evans's breakout season. He began the season with St. Lucie and was promoted to the Binghamton Mets in April. He played in 96 games for Binghamton and led the Eastern League in average, defeating Portland Sea Dogs outfielder Aneury Tavárez in the run for the batting title in the last game of the season, edging him .3351 to .3350. Evans also posted sixth-bests in on-base percentage (.485) and slugging (.485), while recording 131 hits in 410 at bats in 112 games. He also hit eight home runs while batting in 39 runs. In 2017, Evans played for the Las Vegas 51s where he batted .279/.341/.418 with 11 home runs and 56 RBIs in 127 games.

Evans was called up to the majors for the first time on September 8, 2017. He made his Major League debut that night, pinch hitting for Seth Lugo against the Cincinnati Reds at Citi Field. The following day, he recorded his first MLB hit, a double off of Homer Bailey of the Reds. On October 25, Evans was removed from the 40-man roster and sent outright to Las Vegas. He re-signed with the Mets organization on a minor league contract on November 5.

On March 25, 2018, the Mets announced that Evans had made the Opening Day roster. Evans was demoted on April 5 when Michael Conforto was activated from the disabled list. He was designated for assignment by the Mets on June 6. Evans elected free agency on November 3.

=== Chicago Cubs ===
On December 18, 2018, Evans signed a minor league contract with the Chicago Cubs. In 2019, he played with the Iowa Cubs in the Triple–A Pacific Coast League, where he batted .283 with 17 home runs and 61 RBI. Evans elected free agency following the season on November 4, 2019.

=== Pittsburgh Pirates ===
On November 7, 2019, Evans signed with the Toros de Tijuana of the Mexican League. However, on December 17, prior to the start of the Mexican League season, Evans signed a minor league contract with the Pittsburgh Pirates.

On August 8, 2020, Evans was involved in an outfield collision with teammate Gregory Polanco in the 6th inning against the Detroit Tigers. After the collision, Evans was put on a stretcher and carried out by an ambulance. The very next day, it was reported that Evans had suffered a broken jaw and a concussion, and he would likely be out for the rest of the season. At the time, Evans was batting .359 in 11 games since his call-up on July 23. Evans spent the 2021 season with Pittsburgh as well. He played in 76 games, hitting .206 with 5 home runs and 16 RBI. On November 16, 2021, Evans was released by the Pirates.

=== New York Yankees ===
On March 15, 2022, Evans signed a minor league contract with the New York Yankees. In 103 games for the Triple–A Scranton/Wilkes-Barre RailRiders, he batted .244/.310/.366 with 9 home runs and 33 RBI. Evans elected free agency following the season on November 10.

=== Arizona Diamondbacks ===
On December 24, 2022, Evans signed a minor league deal with the Arizona Diamondbacks. He played in 128 games for the Triple–A Reno Aces in 2023, hitting .312/.424/.439 with 11 home runs and a career–high 88 RBI. Evans elected free agency following the season on November 6, 2023.

=== Atlanta Braves ===
On December 21, 2023, Evans signed a minor league contract with the Atlanta Braves. In 51 games for the Triple–A Gwinnett Stripers, he batted .222/.305/.324 with five home runs and 18 RBI. On June 12, 2024, Evans was released by the Braves organization.

=== Toros de Tijuana ===
On June 17, 2024, Evans signed with the Toros de Tijuana of the Mexican League. In 19 games for Tijuana, he batted .324/.418/.456 with three home runs and 11 RBI.

Evans returned for a second season with Tijuana, in 13 appearances for the Toros in 2025, hitting .279/.327/.442 with one home run and eight RBI.

=== Bravos de León ===
On May 29, 2025, Evans was loaned to the Bravos de León of the Mexican League. In 38 games he hit .363/.436/.637 with 10 home runs and 28 RBIs.

=== Toros de Tijuana (second stint) ===
On April 14, 2026, Evans returned to the Toros de Tijuana of the Mexican League.
