= Lee Tae-yang (baseball, born 1993) =

South Korean baseball player

- Pitcher
- Born: January 28, 1993 (age 32); Cheongju, North Chungcheong
- Batted: Left Threw: Right

KBO debut
- May 12, 2011, for the Nexen Heroes

Last appearance
- June 24, 2016, for the NC Dinos

KBO statistics
- Win–loss record: 16–17
- Earned run average: 4.48
- Strikeouts: 204

Teams
- Nexen Heroes (2011–2012); NC Dinos (2013–2016)
Medals
Men's baseball
Representing South Korea
2015 WBSC Premier12
Gold medal – first place	2015 Tokyo	Team

- Lee Tae-yang
- Hangul: 이태양
- Hanja: 李太陽
- RR: I Taeyang
- MR: I T'aeyang

Lee Tae-yang (Korean: 이태양; born January 28, 1993, in Cheongju, Chungcheongbuk-do) is a South Korean pitcher who played for the NC Dinos in the Korea Baseball Organization. He bats left-handed and throws right-handed.

== Amateur career ==
Lee attended Cheongju High School. In August 2010 Lee was selected as a member of the South Korean U-18 national team for the 2010 World Junior Baseball Championship held in Edmonton, Alberta, Canada. He made his first appearance of the tournament in the second game of the first round against Canada but left the game in the first inning, giving up two runs without even recording an out. Lee came on in relief in the bottom of the sixth inning of the final game of the first round against Panama and hurled two scoreless innings with three strikeouts en route to a 12–2 victory. Lee appeared in the first game of the 5th–8th placement round against the USA, coming on in relief in the top of the third inning, and threw one scoreless inning striking out Indians' 2011 first-round pick Francisco Lindor.

=== Notable international appearances ===
Year	Venue	Competition	Team	Individual Note
2010	Canada	World Junior Championship	7th	0–0, 6.00 ERA (3 G, 3.0 IP, 2 ER, 4 K)

== Professional career ==
=== Nexen Heroes ===
In the 2011 KBO Draft, Lee was selected by the Nexen Heroes as the 14th overall pick. For two years with the Heroes, Lee appeared in only nine games in relief, having a 0–1 record and an ERA of 5.19 with one hold.

=== NC Dinos ===
Lee was drafted by the expansion NC Dinos in the 2013 KBO Expansion Draft, to be their utility pitcher for 2013.
