= Trey Nielsen =

American baseball player (born 1991)

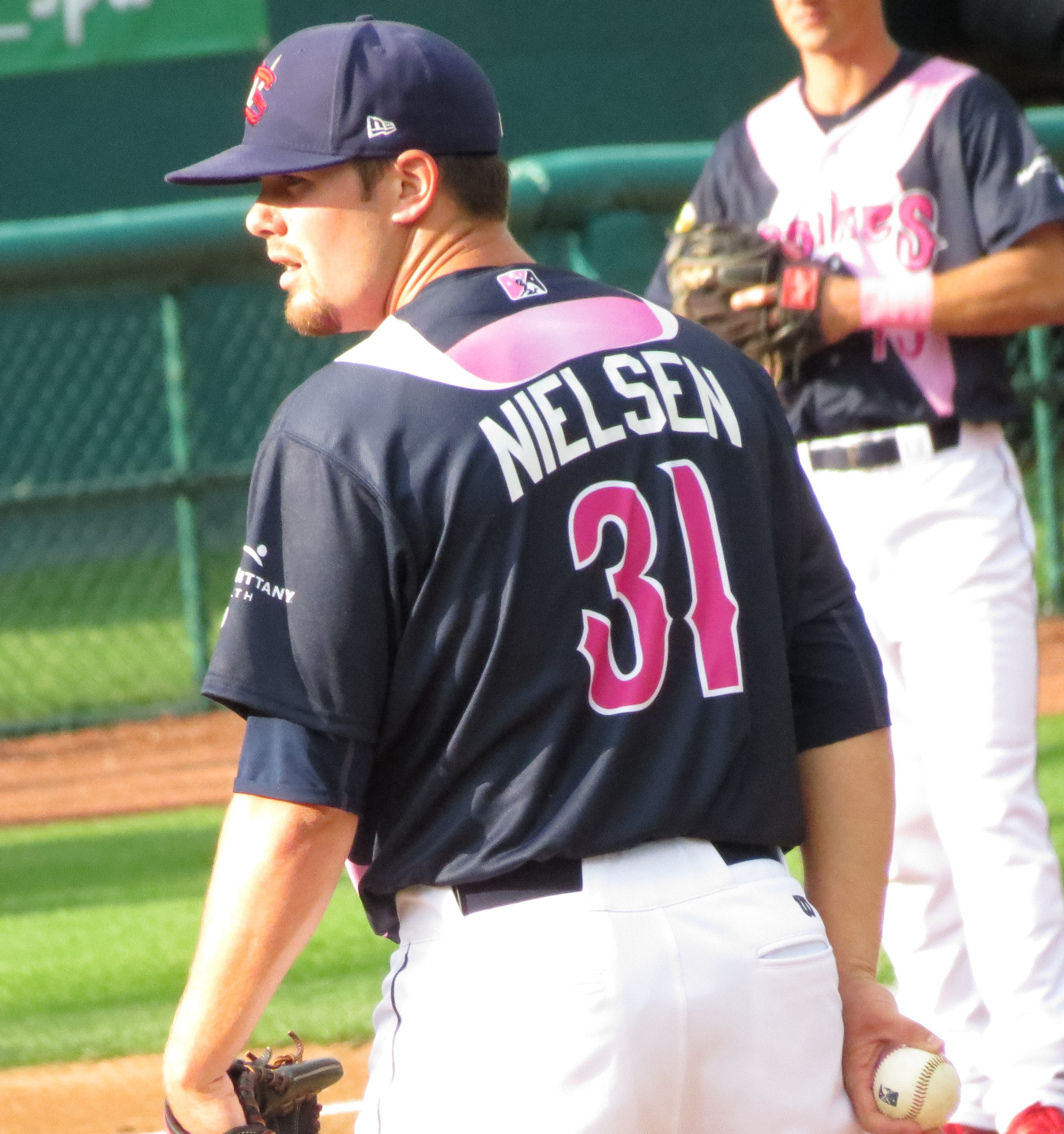
- Nielsen with the State College Spikes in 2014
- Pitcher
- Born: September 1, 1991 (age 34); Salt Lake City, Utah, U.S.
- Bats: Right Throws: Right
- Stats at Baseball Reference

Trey Storm Nielsen (born September 1, 1991) is an American former professional baseball pitcher. He played four seasons in the St. Louis Cardinals organization.

== Career ==
Nielsen attended Skyline High School in Millcreek, Utah. He was drafted by the Chicago Cubs in the 42nd round of the 2010 Major League Baseball draft, but did not sign and attended the University of Utah.

Nielsen was drafted by the St. Louis Cardinals in the 30th round (905th overall) of the 2013 Major League Baseball draft, and signed. He made his professional debut in 2014 with the Low-A State College Spikes, a result of undergoing Tommy John surgery the previous season; in 15 appearances (eight starts) for the Spikes, he logged a 3-2 record and 2.50 ERA with 49 strikeouts and one save across 50 1/3 innings pitched.

In 2015, Nielsen made 25 appearances (18 starts) for the High-A Palm Beach Cardinals, registering a 9-6 record and 2.59 ERA with 78 strikeouts over 111 innings of work. He split the 2016 season between the Double-A Springfield Cardinals and Triple-A Memphis Redbirds. In 24 appearances (20 starts) for the two affiliates, Nielsen compiled a cumulative 9-8 record and 3.75 ERA with 85 strikeouts and one save across 127 1/3 innings pitched.

Nielsen was on Italy's roster for the 2017 World Baseball Classic. He returned to Springfield and Memphis for the 2017 season, accumulating a 2-0 record and 3.47 ERA with 32 strikeouts and one save in 49 1/3 innings pitched across 28 appearances (two starts). On January 18, 2018, Nielsen announced his retirement from professional baseball, citing possible affordability issues of remaining in the minor leagues.
