= Orlando Oberto =

Italian professional baseball pitcher (born 1980)

Orlando "Junior" Oberto (born 30 December 1980) is an Italian professional baseball pitcher.

Oberto pitches for T&A San Marino in the Italian Baseball League. He played for the Italian national baseball team in the 2017 World Baseball Classic.
