= Zack Segovia =

American baseball player (born 1983)

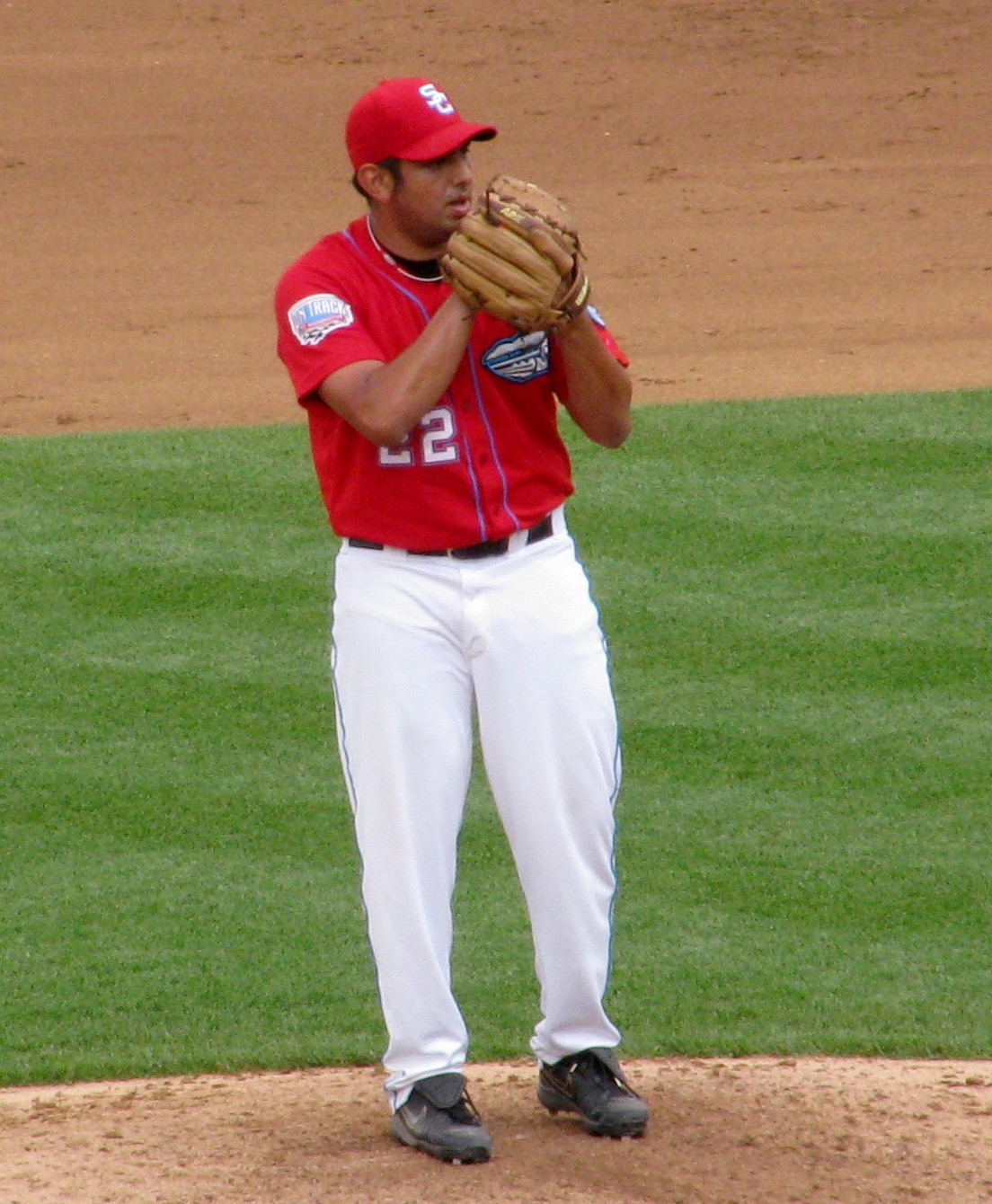
- Segovia with the Syracuse Chiefs
- Pitcher
- Born: April 11, 1983 (age 43); Dallas, Texas, U.S.
- Batted: Right Threw: Right

Professional debut
- MLB: April 8, 2007, for the Philadelphia Phillies
- CPBL: August 12, 2015, for the Uni-President 7-Eleven Lions

Last appearance
- MLB: October 3, 2009, for the Washington Nationals
- CPBL: July 20, 2018, for the Chinatrust Brothers

MLB statistics
- Win–loss record: 1–1
- Earned run average: 8.22
- Strikeouts: 6

CPBL statistics
- Win–loss record: 23–15
- Earned run average: 5.08
- Strikeouts: 233
- Stats at Baseball Reference

Teams
- Philadelphia Phillies (2007); Washington Nationals (2009); Uni-President 7-Eleven Lions (2015); Lamigo Monkeys (2016–2017); Chinatrust Brothers (2018)

Career highlights and awards
- Taiwan Series champion (2017)
Medals
Men's baseball
Representing United States
WBSC Premier12
Silver medal – second place	2015 Tokyo	Team
World Junior Baseball Championship
Silver medal – second place	2000 Edmonton	Team

Zachary Ernest Segovia (born April 11, 1983) is an American former professional baseball pitcher. He played in Major League Baseball (MLB) for the Philadelphia Phillies and Washington Nationals, and in the Chinese Professional Baseball League (CPBL) for the Uni-President 7-Eleven Lions, Lamigo Monkeys, and Chinatrust Brothers.

== Career ==
=== Philadelphia Phillies ===
Segovia was drafted by the Philadelphia Phillies in the second round of the 2002 MLB draft. He made his professional debut that season playing for the Rookie League Gulf Coast League Phillies. Segovia played for the GCL Phillies and the Single-A Lakewood BlueClaws in 2003.

In 2004, Segovia missed the entire season while recovering from Tommy John surgery on his right elbow performed in October 2003. He returned to play with the High-A Clearwater Phillies in 2005. In 2006, Segovia played with Clearwater Threshers and the Double-A Reading Phillies.

Segovia, who made the Phillies 2007 Opening Day roster, made his MLB debut on April 8, 2007, against the Florida Marlins. He pitched five innings in his first start, giving up eight hits, five runs, and striking out two, while walking just one batter. Segovia also pitched for Reading and the Triple-A Ottawa Lynx that season. He began the 2009 season playing for Clearwater and Reading.

Segovia was released by the Phillies organization on June 12, 2009, and became a free agent.

=== Washington Nationals ===
On June 18, 2009, Segovia signed with the Washington Nationals. He played eight games for the Nationals. The rest of the season was spent in their minor league system with the rookie-level Gulf Coast League Nationals, Single-A Hagerstown Suns, High-A Potomac Nationals, and Double-A Harrisburg Senators. Segovia was released from the Nationals organization on December 10.

=== New York Yankees ===
On January 5, 2010, Segovia signed a minor league contract with the New York Yankees that included an invitation to spring training. He was assigned to the Triple-A Scranton/Wilkes-Barre Yankees, where he posted a 3-2 record and 4.19 ERA with 51 strikeouts and four saves across 44 relief outings.

=== Milwaukee Brewers ===
On November 22, 2010, Segovia signed a minor league contract with the Milwaukee Brewers that included an invitation to spring training. He made 45 appearances for the Triple-A Nashville Sounds in 2011, compiling a 5-4 record and 3.98 ERA with 50 strikeouts and two saves across 63 1/3 innings pitched.

=== Detroit Tigers ===
On February 15, 2012, Segovia signed a minor league contract with the Colorado Rockies organization. However, he never appeared for the organization.

Segovia pitched for the Double-A Erie SeaWolves of Detroit Tigers organization in 2012, working to a 5-6 record and 5.98 ERA with 30 strikeouts in 64 2/3 innings pitched across 12 starts.

=== Acereros de Monclova ===
On June 13, 2013, Segovia signed with the Acereros de Monclova of the Mexican League. He made four appearances (three starts) for the club, posting an 0-1 record and 6.75 ERA with eight strikeouts over 12 innings of work.

=== York Revolution ===
On July 25, 2013, Segovia signed with the York Revolution of the Atlantic League of Professional Baseball. He made 10 appearances (eight starts) for the Revolution, logging a 3-5 record and 5.30 ERA with 27 strikeouts across 52 2/3 innings pitched.

=== Diablos Rojos del México ===
On May 6, 2014, Segovia signed with the Diablos Rojos del México of the Mexican League. In 14 appearances (11 starts) for the Diablos, Segovia pitched to a 4-4 record and 5.95 ERA with 59 strikeouts over 65 innings of work.

=== Acereros de Monclova (second stint) ===
On July 12, 2014, Segovia was traded to the Acereros de Monclova of the Mexican League. He would start six contests for the club, registering a 2-2 record and 2.59 ERA with 25 strikeouts across 41 2/3 innings pitched.

=== Texas Rangers ===
Segovia signed a minor league contract with the Texas Rangers on August 25, 2014. In two starts for the Triple-A Round Rock Express, Segovia struggled to an 0-1 record and 8.31 ERA with eight strikeouts across 8 2/3 innings pitched.

=== San Diego Padres ===
On February 5, 2015, Segovia signed a minor league contract with the San Diego Padres. He made 11 appearances (10 starts) split between the Double-A San Antonio Missions and Triple-A El Paso Chihuahuas, accumulating a 3-2 record and 6.75 ERA with 39 strikeouts over 48 innings of work. Segovia was released by the Padres organization on June 21.

=== Acereros de Monclova (third stint) ===
On March 17, 2016, Segovia signed with the Acereros de Monclova of the Mexican League. In 40 appearances out of the bullpen, he registered a 3-4 record and 2.97 ERA with 37 strikeouts across 39 1/3 innings pitched. Segovia was released by Monclova on June 28.

=== Lamigo Monkeys ===
On July 4, 2016, Segovia signed for Lamigo Monkeys of the Chinese Professional Baseball League. He made eight appearances (seven starts) for Lamigo, posting a 3-1 record and 4.11 ERA with 28 strikeouts over 46 innings of work.

Segovia made 27 appearances (26 starts) for the Monkeys in 2017, accumulating a 16-5 record and 4.20 ERA with 129 strikeouts across 165 innings pitched.

=== Chinatrust Brothers ===
On February 8, 2018, Segovia signed with the Chinatrust Brothers of the Chinese Professional Baseball League. He was released on July 21, and finished his campaign with a 7.13 ERA and 1.69 WHIP over 77 innings pitched.

=== Acereros de Monclova (fourth stint) ===
On August 1, 2018, Segovia signed back with the Acereros de Monclova of the Mexican League. He made 13 appearances for Monclova down the stretch, registering an 0-1 record and 2.77 ERA with 10 strikeouts over 13 innings of work.

=== Pericos de Puebla ===
On April 6, 2019, Segovia signed with the Pericos de Puebla of the Mexican League. He made 27 appearances for the Pericos, compiling a 3-3 record and 5.26 ERA with 21 strikeouts across 25 2/3 innings pitched.

=== Acereros de Monclova (fifth stint) ===
On June 7, 2019, Segovia was traded back to the Acereros de Monclova of the Mexican League. In six relief outings for the team, he struggled to an 0-1 record and 8.22 ERA with 11 strikeouts across 7 2/3 innings pitched. Segovia was released by Monclova on June 30.

=== Bravos de León ===
On July 2, 2019, Segovia signed with the Bravos de León of the Mexican League. He made 23 appearances for the Bravos, but struggled to an 0-4 record and 6.46 ERA with 25 strikeouts and one save across 23 2/3 innings pitched. Segovia became a free agent following the season.

Segovia announced his retirement from professional baseball on March 11, 2020.
