= Long Island Ducks =

American baseball team

- Logo

Information
- League: Atlantic League of Professional Baseball (North Division)
- Location: Central Islip, New York
- Ballpark: Fairfield Properties Ballpark
- Founded: 2000
- League championships: 5 (2004, 2012, 2013, 2019, 2026)
- Division championships: 9 (2004, 2011, 2012, 2013, 2016, 2017, 2018, 2019, 2021)
- Colors: Green, orange, black, white
- Mascot: QuackerJack
- Ownership: REV Entertainment
- Manager: Lew Ford
- Media: Newsday
- Website: liducks.com

The Long Island Ducks are an American professional independent league baseball team based on Long Island in Central Islip, New York. The Ducks compete in the North Division of the Atlantic League of Professional Baseball (ALPB), an independent "partner league" of Major League Baseball. The Ducks played their first season in 2000, two years after the ALPB inaugural season. Since their inception, the Ducks' home ballpark has been Fairfield Properties Ballpark, formerly known as Bethpage Ballpark (2010–2020), Suffolk County Sports Park (1999 and 2010), EAB Park (2000–2001), and Citibank Park (2002–2009). The "Ducks" name refers to Long Island's duck-farming heritage (itself represented by the Big Duck ferrocement) and recalls the former professional ice hockey team Long Island Ducks. The team's first manager was Bud Harrelson, a part-owner of the team and a former major league player.

== History ==
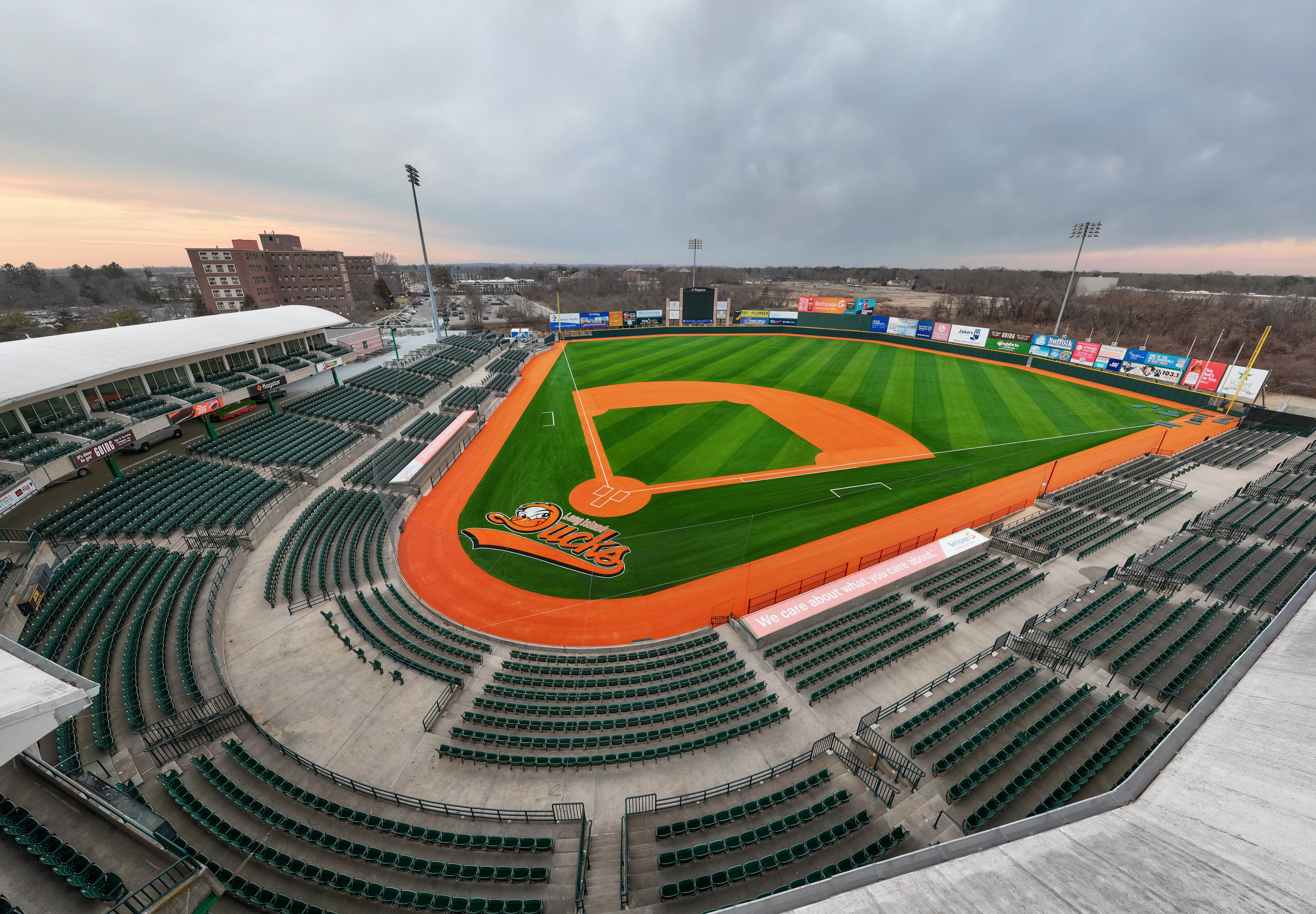
Fairfield Properties Ballpark

The Ducks began play in 2000, and from 2000 to 2026 won five Atlantic League of Professional Baseball (ALPB) championships. Team owner Frank Boulton expressed his contentment with the Ducks in 2007 to the publication Baseball America, saying, "The Long Island Ducks are the best thing I've ever done in baseball."

A rivalry developed between the Ducks and the Bridgeport Bluefish, with the two teams contesting the "Ferry Cup" from 2009 until Bridgeport folded in 2017. The Ferry Cup name referred to its sponsor, the Bridgeport & Port Jefferson Steamboat Company, (which runs a ferry boat line across the Long Island Sound between Bridgeport, Connecticut and Port Jefferson on Long Island), which was frequently utilized by both of the teams and their fans for traveling to each ballpark in the two adjacent states.

Baseball Hall of Famer Gary Carter managed the Ducks in 2009. Following Carter's death in 2012, the Ducks dedicated the season to his memory and wore a commemorative patch on their uniforms.

Former Major League Baseball players who have played on the Ducks include Dontrelle Willis, Ramon Castro, Ben Broussard, Leo Rosales, Josh Barfield, Bill Hall, Bryant Nelson, Ian Snell, Taylor Kohlwey, Daniel Murphy, and Lew Ford. Rich Hill played with the Ducks in 2015, prior to his return to the majors in 2016 with the Boston Red Sox. In 2017, pitcher Éric Gagné attempted a professional baseball comeback with the Ducks; that same year, Nate Freiman, Henderson Alvarez, Quintin Berry, and Tim Melville played with the Ducks and later joined an MLB organization or foreign professional league. In 2026, in his second game with the Ducks, former Cy Young Award winner Trevor Bauer threw a 7-inning no-hitter (game 1 of a doubleheader), allowing just a single walk. This was the third no-hitter in Ducks' history.

On June 17, 2023, the Ducks became the winningest team in Atlantic League history, clinching their 1,581st win in a victory over the York Revolution of York, Pennsylvania.

In 2026, the Ducks were sold to REV Entertainment, the official sports and entertainment company of the Texas Rangers, who also have an ownership stake in the Schaumburg Boomers, Kane County Cougars, and Cleburne Railroaders (all members of the National Association of Professional Baseball).

== Logos and uniforms ==
The Ducks' official colors are black, green, orange, and white. The primary logo features the "Ducks" wordmark in orange with black outline. The wordmark begins with a stylized, cartoon duck head in the form of a capital cursive "D."

Since 2015, OC Sports has been the official on-field headwear of the Atlantic League. The home caps are black with the duck head logo centered on the front. The away caps are black with an orange brim and the duck head logo. Batting helmets are black with the webbed-foot logo.

The Ducks wear uniforms produced by Rawlings. The home jersey is white with black pinstripes with the "Ducks" wordmark centered across the front. The numbering on the jersey is primarily in green with white outline and black drop shadow. The away jerseys are grey with the "Long Island" cursive wordmark centered across in green with white and orange outline. The numbering is in green with white outline and orange drop shadow. The alternate is an orange jersey with the "Ducks" word mark centered across the chest.

== Season-by-season records ==
Long Island Ducks – 2004–2021
Season	W–L Record	Win %	Finish	Playoffs
2000	82–58	.586	3rd in North Division	Did Not Make Playoffs
2001	62–64	.492	1st in North Division	Did Not Make Playoffs
2002	65–61	.516	2nd in North Division	Did Not Make Playoffs
2003	67–59	.532	1st in North Division	Did Not Make Playoffs
2004	65–61	.516	3rd in North Division	5–1 (Won Championship)
2005	67–73	.479	1st in North Division	1–2 (Lost Division Final)
2006	73–53	.579	2nd in North Division	0–2 (Lost Division Final)
2007	72–54	.571	1st in North Division	0–2 (Lost Division Final)
2008	71–69	.507	1st in Liberty Division	0–2 (Lost Division Final)
2009	74–66	.529	1st in Liberty Division	2–3 (Lost Division Final)
2010	70–68	.507	3rd in Liberty Division	Did Not Make Playoffs
2011	78–47	.624	1st in Liberty Division	4–4 (Lost Championship Series)
2012	63–74	.460	3rd in Liberty Division	6–4 (Won Championship)
2013	63–77	.450	2nd in Liberty Division	6–2 (Won Championship)
2014	73–67	.521	2nd in Liberty Division	Did Not Make Playoffs
2015	80–59	.576	2nd in Liberty Division	2–3 (Lost Division Final)
2016	72–68	.514	2nd in Liberty Division	3–5 (Lost Championship Series)
2017	73–67	.521	3rd in Liberty Division	3–4 (Lost Championship Series)
2018	68–57	.544	2nd in Liberty Division	5–5 (Lost Championship Series)
2019	86–54	.614	1st in Liberty Division	6–2 (Won Championship)
2020	Season canceled due to the COVID-19 pandemic			
2021	68–52	.567	1st in North Division	2–1 (Won Division Series); 1–3 (Lost Championship Series)
2022	64–68	.485	3rd in North Division	Did Not Make Playoffs
2023	66–58	.532	3rd in North Division	0–3 (Lost Division Series)
2024	64–62	.508	3rd in North Division	Did Not Make Playoffs
2025	72–54	.571	2nd in North Division	Did Not Make Playoffs
Totals (2000–2024)	1687–1496	.530	16 Playoff berths	4 Championships
Playoffs	46–48	.489	—	—

- 5 Atlantic League Championships (2004, 2012, 2013, 2019, 2026)

== TV/Radio ==
All games have been broadcast live on Dugout TV under the HomeTeam Network channel, the Atlantic League's media streaming rights partner since 2026. Wednesday and Friday games are also broadcast by Hofstra University students on WRHU/88.7-FM. Michael Polak, David Weiss, and Mike Mohr currently serve as the team's broadcasters.

== Mascot ==
The Ducks' official mascot is an anthropomorphic duck named QuackerJack. He wears the Ducks' full home white uniform with green and white sneakers. He debuted on March 18, 2000. His name alludes to a popular Cracker Jack ballpark snack food and the quacking sound of a duck.

== Current roster ==
Long Island Ducks roster
Active roster	Coaching staff
Pitchers: 55 Jacob Asa; 44 Clark Candiotti; 24 Nolan Clenney; 35 Garrett Crowley; 37 Jose Cruz; 11 Michael Dominguez; 31 Luis González; 40 Tanner Jacobson; 14 Ryan Langford; 26 Rafael Kelly; 25 Nick Margevicius; 24 Brian Moran; 25 Angel Reyes; 30 Sal Romano; 38 Ramon Santos; 36 Leonardo Taveras; Catchers: 13 Aaron Antonini; 17 Gavin Collins; 27 René Pinto; Infielders: 15 Marcus Chiu; 29 Wilmer Difo; 9 Kole Kaler; 6 Henry Kusiak; 32 Alsander Womack; Outfielders: 41 Jorge Bonifacio; 34 Anthony García; 2 Jacob Robson; 5 Chris Roller; 23 Terrell Tatum	Manager: 20 Lew Ford; Coaches: 21 Tim Battle Jr. (bench); 18 Bobby Blevins (pitching); Disabled list; ‡ Inactive list; § Suspended list; Roster updated August 29, 2026 Transactions

== Retired numbers ==
4 (Justin Davies)
Outfielder and franchise record holder for stolen bases. Retired on June 19, 2015
16 (Ray Navarrete)
Utility player and franchise record holder for runs, home runs, RBI, and doubles. Retired on August 16, 2015
42 (Jackie Robinson)
Second baseman. Retired throughout professional baseball on April 15, 1997
3 (Bud Harrelson)
Part owner of Long Island Ducks. Retired on August 3, 2018

Achievements
Preceded by Long Island Ducks; 2012	Atlantic League champions Long Island Ducks; 2013	Succeeded by Lancaster Barnstormers; 2014

Achievements
Preceded by Long Island Ducks; 2016	Liberty Division champions Long Island Ducks; 2017	Succeeded by –
Preceded by Nashua Pride; 2003	North Division champions Long Island Ducks; 2004	Succeeded by Nashua Pride; 2005
