= Fortitudo Baseball Bologna =

Fortitudo Bologna
Logo
Cap insignia

Information
- League: Serie A
- Location: Bologna, Italy
- Ballpark: Gianni Falchi Stadium
- Established: 1953; 73 years ago
- Scudetti: 14 (1969, 1972, 1974, 1978, 1984, 2003, 2005, 2009, 2014, 2016, 2018, 2019, 2020, 2023)
- Colors: Dark blue, sky blue and white

Current uniforms
Home	Away

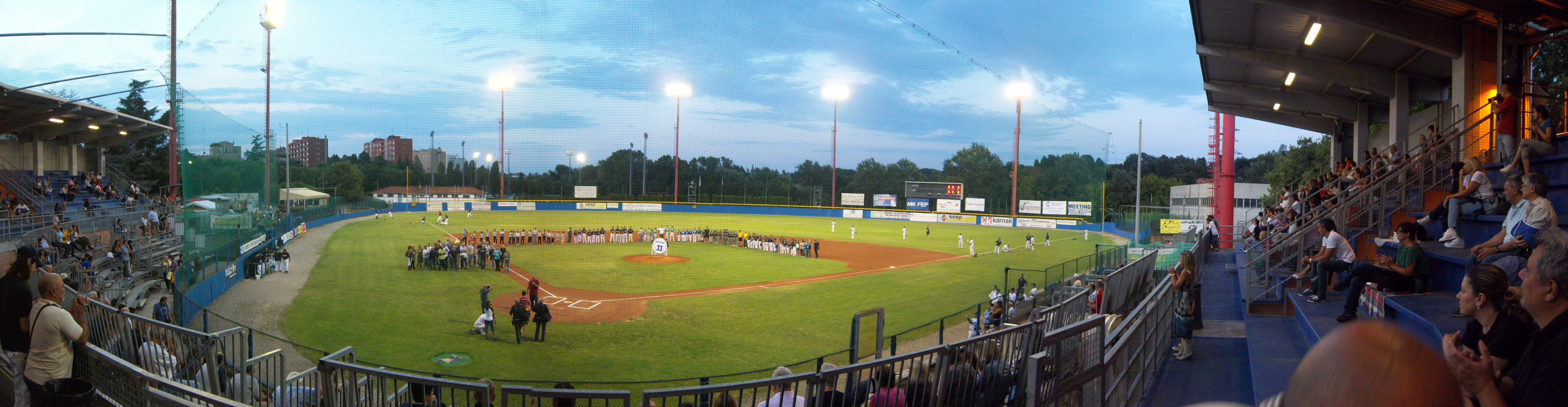
Gianni Falchi Stadium (2011)

Fortitudo Baseball 1953, commonly referred to as Fortitudo Bologna, also known as Longbridge 2000 Bologna or Unipol Bologna for sponsorship reasons, is a baseball club based in Bologna that competes in Serie A1, Italy's professional baseball league.

The team plays at Gianni Falchi Stadium and has won 14 national championships and 6 European Cups.

== History ==
The club was founded in 1953 when the Società Ginnastica Fortitudo (Fortitudo Gimnastics Society) established its baseball section. In 1963, the team merges with ACLI Labor from the baseball Serie A and joins the top level of Italian baseball. That same year, the baseball section becomes autonomous under the presidency of Pietro Leoni and with Jimmy Strong as manager.

Fortitudo Baseball has won thirteen Italian championships in 1969, 1972, 1974, 1978, 1984, 2003, 2005, 2009, 2014, 2016, 2018, 2019 and 2020, and the European Championship six times (1973, 1985, 2010, 2012, 2013, 2019).

In 2013, Fortitudo was the first European team to be invited to participate in the Asia Series, placing sixth overall after losing to Samsung Lions (5–2) and Uni-President 7-Eleven Lions (10–0).

In 2019, Fortitudo hosted and won the 2019 European Champions Cup, defeating Amsterdam Pirates in the final.

=== Sponsors ===
- 1969–1975: Amaro Montenegro
- 1975–1976: Grappa Canonier
- 1979–1980: Biemme Giocattoli
- 1982: Del Monte
- 1983: Nordmende
- 1984–1985: Be. Ca. Carni
- 1986–1987: Biemme Giocattoli
- 1988–1989: Caffè Meseta
- 1990–1991: Poliedil
- 1992: Eurobuilding
- 1993: Gaudianello
- 1995–2008: Italeri
- 2009–present Unipol

== Roster ==
Fortitudo Baseball roster – Serie A 2022
Players		Coaches
Pitchers: 77 (Italy) Maurizio Andretta; 80 (Italy) Alex Bassani; 19 (Italy) Filippo Crepaldi; 18 (Dominican Republic) Luis González; 34 (Brazil) Murilo Gouvea; 75 (Venezuela) Raúl Rivero; 35 (United States) Christian Scafidi	Catchers: 9 (Italy) Alessandro Deotto; 30 (Venezuela) Ernesto Liberatore; Infielders: 25 (Italy) Filippo Agretti; 1 (Italy) Julian Dreni; 22 (Italy) Francesco Fuzzi; 31 (Netherlands) Kevin Josephina; 6 (Italy) Ricardo Paolini; Outfielders: 14 (Italy) Riccardo Bertossi; 39 (Italy) Lorenzo Dobboletta; 29 (Italy) Alessandro Grimaudo; 38 (Netherlands) Gilmer Lampe; 41 (Venezuela) Renzo Martini	Manager: -- (Italy) Fabio Betto; Coaches: -- (Italy) Juan Carlos Infante
