= Filippo Crepaldi =

Italian baseball player (born 1992)

Fortitudo Baseball – No. 19
- Pitcher
- Born: 19 February 1992 (age 34)
- Bats: Right Throws: Right
- Stats at Baseball Reference
Medals
Men's baseball
Representing Italy
European Baseball Championship
Bronze medal – third place	2016 Hoofddorp	National team

Filippo Crepaldi (born 19 February 1992) is an Italian professional baseball pitcher for the Unipol Bologna of the Italian Baseball League.

Crepaldi played for the Italy national baseball team at the 2010 World Junior Baseball Championship and for Team Europe at the 2015 edition of the Asia Winter Baseball League. He also pitched for his club team at the 2013 Asia Series. He was selected to represent Italy at the 2017 World Baseball Classic. He played for Team Italy in the 2019 European Baseball Championship. He is playing for the team at the Africa/Europe 2020 Olympic Qualification tournament, taking place in Italy from 18 September 2019.
