= Bryan Rodríguez (footballer) =

Costa Rican-born Nicaraguan footballer (born 1996)

Personal information
- Full name: Bryan Adiak Rodríguez Torres
- Date of birth: 23 September 1996 (age 30)
- Place of birth: Alajuela, Costa Rica
- Height: 1.74 m (5 ft 9 in)
- Position: Goalkeeper

Team information
- Current team: Santa Ana
- Number: 22

Senior career*
Years	Team	Apps	(Gls)
2016–2022	Carmelita	19	(0)
2017–2018	→ Curridabat (loan)	27	(0)
2020–2021	→ Municipal Grecia (loan)		
2022–	Santa Ana		

International career^{‡}
2019–	Nicaragua	6	(0)
- * Club domestic league appearances and goals as of 14 April 2019 ‡ National team caps and goals as of 26 March 2019

Bryan Adiak Rodríguez Torres (born 23 September 1996) is a Costa Rican-born Nicaraguan footballer who plays as a goalkeeper for Municipal Santa Ana and the Nicaragua national team.

His father is Costa Rican and his mother is Nicaraguan.
