= 2015 WBSC Premier12 =

International baseball competition in 2015

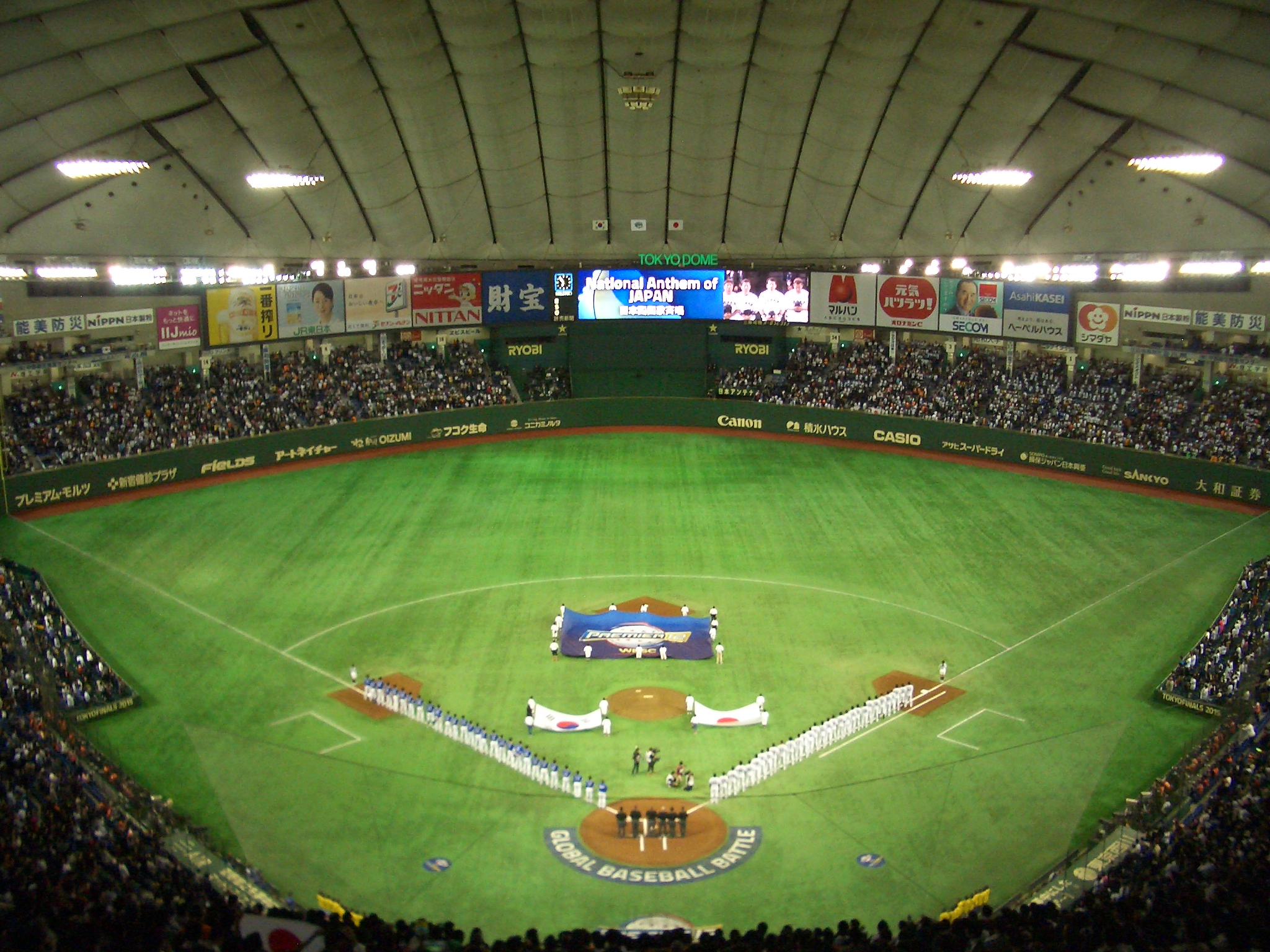
- Semi-final game between Japan and South Korea

Tournament details
- Countries: Japan; Taiwan
- Dates: November 8–21
- Teams: 12

Final positions
- Champions: South Korea (1st title)
- Runners-up: United States
- Third place: Japan
- Fourth place: Mexico

Tournament statistics
- Games played: 38
- Attendance: 235,951 (6,209 per game)
- Most HRs: (Chinese Taipei) Chih-Sheng Lin (4)
- Most SBs: Three tied (Note: Yadir Drake, Randolph Oduber and Juan Silva) (3)
- Best ERA: (Japan) Shohei Ohtani (Note: Ohtani had the most innings pitched among pitchers who had a 0.00 ERA in the tournament.) (0.00)
- Most Ks (as pitcher): (Japan) Shohei Ohtani (21)

Awards
- MVP: (South Korea) Kim Hyun-soo

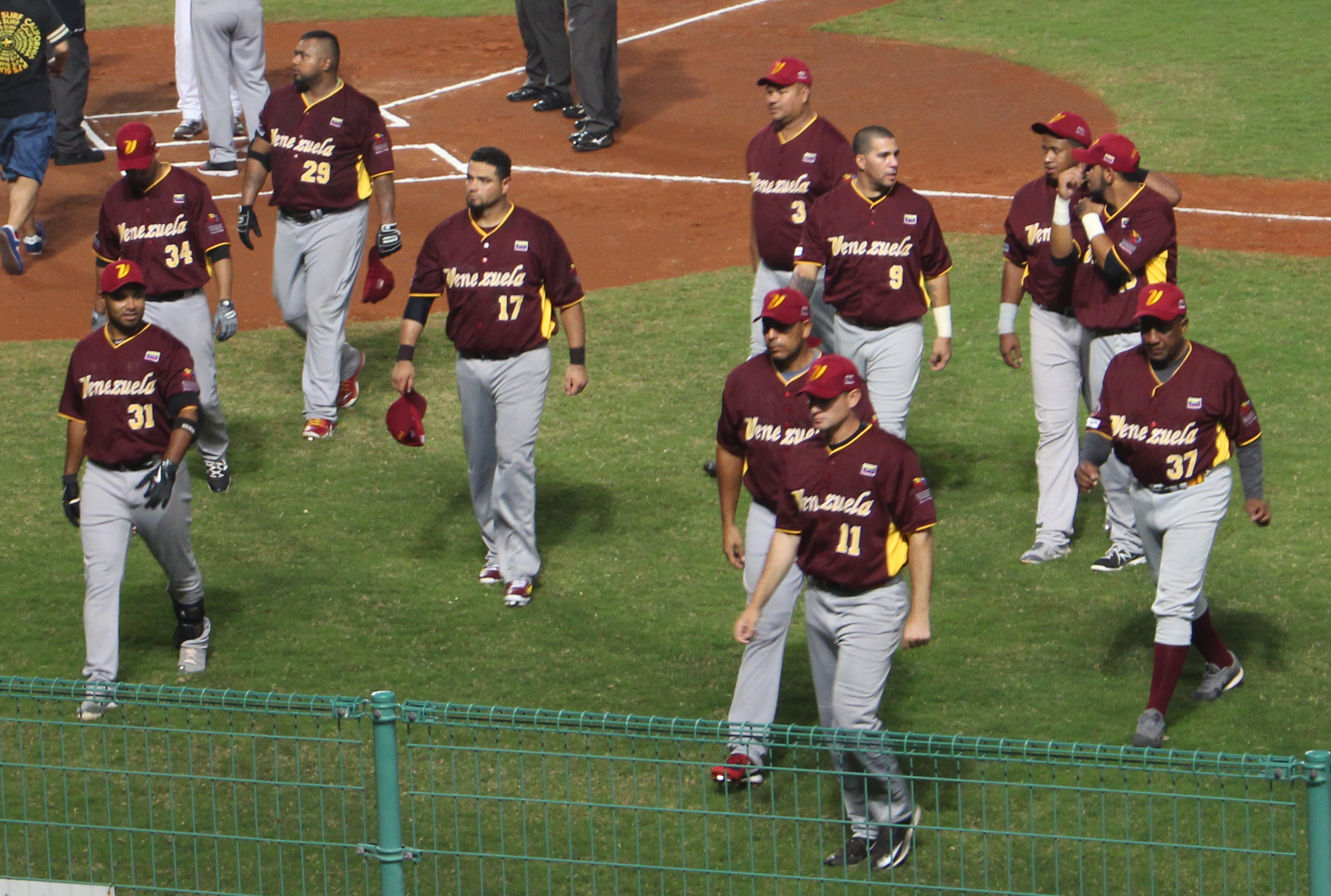
Venezuela national baseball team on November 7, 2015

The 2015 WBSC Premier12 was an international baseball championship sponsored by the World Baseball Softball Confederation (WBSC), the inaugural event of the WBSC Premier12. It was held from November 8 to 21 in Taiwan and Japan. The South Korean national team won the championship, and split a US$1 million prize.

The top twelve teams in the WBSC World Rankings qualified to participate in the tournament, which began with two groups of six teams playing in a round-robin format for the first round. The tournament then continued with the top four teams in each group playing in the knockout stage, leading to the championship game. In the final, South Korea defeated United States 8–0 to win their first WBSC Premier12 title, and became the first nation to win the championship. Japan finished in third place, while Mexico finished in fourth place. South Korea's Hyun-soo Kim won the Most Valuable Player Award. Shohei Ohtani of Japan had the lowest earned run average of the tournament, and Hayato Sakamoto, also of Japan, was named the tournament's most outstanding defensive player.

== Teams ==
Top 12 Rankings as of November 22, 2014
Rank	Team	Points	Confederation
1	Japan	785.18	BFA
2	United States	766.02	COPABE
3	Cuba	662.98	COPABE
4	Chinese Taipei	605.48	BFA
5	Netherlands	433.50	CEB
6	Dominican Republic	379.18	COPABE
7	Canada	353.52	COPABE
8	South Korea	340.90	BFA
9	Puerto Rico	291.50	COPABE
10	Venezuela	269.00	COPABE
11	Italy	196.18	CEB
12	Mexico	136.78	COPABE

The twelve highest-ranked national teams (as of the 2014 end-of-the-year world rankings) qualified to participate in the inaugural 2015 WBSC Premier 12, based on the most recent WBSC World Rankings, which were updated on November 22, 2014. The membership in the top twelve in the world rankings, which are updated only once every year, was unchanged from 2013. In fact, there was no movement at all between the 7th and 15th positions in the rankings.

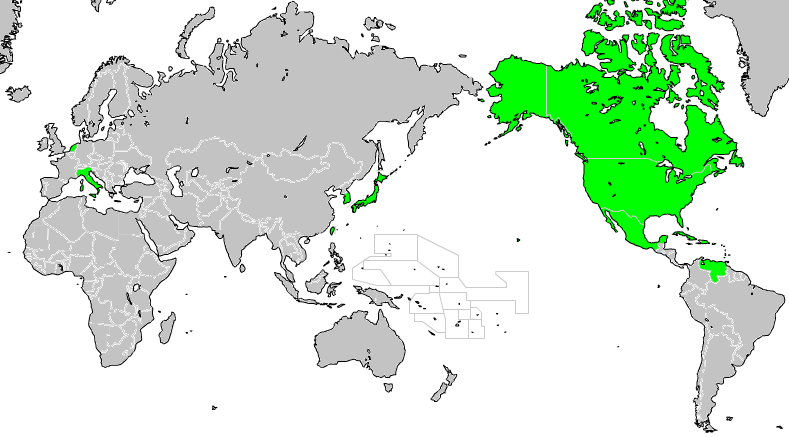
Qualified 12 teams

=== Players ===
The majority of teams in the tournament missed the October 10 deadline for submitting rosters. Major League Baseball (MLB), which sponsors the World Baseball Classic, declined to allow players on MLB 40-man rosters to participate in the tournament. The final rosters included a mix of MLB prospects (such as Milwaukee Brewers outfielder Brett Phillips and Chicago White Sox outfielder Jacob May for the United States), former MLB veterans (such as Curaçaoan infielder Andruw Jones and Dominican infielder Pedro Feliz) and non-MLB stars (including Japanese pitchers Shohei Ohtani and South Korean infielder Park Byung-ho).

== Format ==
For the first stage, the twelve teams were divided into two groups of six. Each team played five games in a round robin format. With the exception of the first game of the tournament, a contest between Japan and South Korea at the Sapporo Dome, Taiwan hosted all games in the group stage at four different ballparks.

The top four teams from each group then advanced to a single-elimination tournament. The semifinal and final round were held in Japan while the location of the quarterfinal, the first round of the playoff stage, was initially undetermined. Thirty-eight games were played over fourteen days, culminating in the consolation game and championship game at the Tokyo Dome on the final day of the tournament.

== Broadcast ==
Fox Sports was awarded broadcast rights in Cyprus, Greece, Israel, Italy, Malta, Netherlands and Turkey. Dutch public broadcast network NOS will also air the tournament in the Netherlands. Rights were also awarded to Eleven Sports Network in Belgium, Poland, Singapore and Malaysia; beIN Sports in Indonesia, Singapore and Oceania; LeTV and PPTV in China; Sky Net in Myanmar; Solar TV in the Philippines; i-CABLE in Hong Kong; OSN in the Middle East and North Africa; SBS in South Korea; Videoland in Taiwan; CIRT in Cuba; and Sportsnet in Canada. In Japan, Tokyo Broadcasting System Television, TV Asahi and J Sports will all be carrying the tournament.

For areas not covered by the event's broadcast partners, the event will be livestreamed for free on the WBSC's YouTube channel.

== Venues ==
Group A	Group A and Quarterfinals	Group B
Douliu, Taiwan	Taichung, Taiwan	Taipei, Taiwan
Douliu Baseball Stadium	Taichung Intercontinental Baseball Stadium	Tianmu Baseball Stadium
Capacity: 15,000	Capacity: 20,000	Capacity: 10,500

Group B and Quarterfinals	Group B	Semifinals and Finals
Taoyuan, Taiwan	Sapporo, Japan	Tokyo, Japan
Taoyuan International Baseball Stadium	Sapporo Dome	Tokyo Dome
Capacity: 20,000	Capacity: 40,467	Capacity: 46,000

== Group stage ==
=== Group A ===
Pos	Team	Pld	W	L	RF	RA	RD	PCT	GB	Qualification
1	Canada	5	5	0	23	10	+13	1.000	—	Advance to playoff stage
2	Cuba	5	3	2	18	22	−4	.600 (Note: Cuba defeated the Netherlands 6–5.)	2	Advance to playoff stage
3	Netherlands	5	3	2	40	21	+19	.600	2	Advance to playoff stage
4	Puerto Rico	5	2	3	28	26	+2	.400 (Note: Puerto Rico defeated Chinese Taipei 7–4.)	3	Advance to playoff stage
5	Chinese Taipei (H)	5	2	3	27	25	+2	.400	3	
6	Italy	5	0	5	4	36	−32	.000	5	

(H) Hosts
Notes:

Date	Local time	Road team	Score	Home team	Inn.	Venue	Game duration	Attendance	Boxscore
November 9	18:35	Netherlands	7–4	Chinese Taipei		Intercontinental Baseball Stadium	3:55	16,188	
November 10	12:35	Italy	1–7	Puerto Rico		Intercontinental Baseball Stadium	3:37	483	
November 10	18:35	Canada	5–1	Cuba		Intercontinental Baseball Stadium	3:21	639	
November 11	12:35	Cuba	6–5	Netherlands		Intercontinental Baseball Stadium	3:21	674	
November 11	18:35	Puerto Rico	0–2	Canada		Douliu Baseball Stadium	2:51	335	
November 11	18:35	Chinese Taipei	7–1	Italy		Intercontinental Baseball Stadium	2:53	8,517	
November 12	12:35	Puerto Rico	7–8	Cuba	10	Intercontinental Baseball Stadium	3:50	281	
November 12	18:35	Netherlands	16–1	Italy	7	Douliu Baseball Stadium	3:08	119	
November 12	18:35	Canada	9–8	Chinese Taipei		Intercontinental Baseball Stadium	3:45	10,245	
November 14	12:35	Puerto Rico	7–11	Netherlands		Intercontinental Baseball Stadium	3:33	308	
November 14	18:35	Italy	0–4	Canada		Douliu Baseball Stadium	2:29	500	
November 14	18:35	Cuba	1–4	Chinese Taipei		Intercontinental Baseball Stadium	3:33	17,503	
November 15	12:35	Chinese Taipei	4–7	Puerto Rico	12	Intercontinental Baseball Stadium	4:41	17,436	
November 15	18:35	Italy	1–2	Cuba		Douliu Baseball Stadium	2:21	1,200	
November 15	18:35	Canada	3–1	Netherlands		Intercontinental Baseball Stadium	2:31	218	

=== Group B ===
Pos	Team	Pld	W	L	RF	RA	RD	PCT	GB	Qualification
1	Japan (H)	5	5	0	31	14	+17	1.000	—	Advance to playoff stage
2	United States	5	3	2	31	24	+7	.600 (Note: United States defeated South Korea 3–2.)	2	Advance to playoff stage
3	South Korea	5	3	2	29	14	+15	.600	2	Advance to playoff stage
4	Mexico	5	2	3	23	30	−7	.400 (Note: Mexico defeated Venezuela 6–4.)	3	Advance to playoff stage
5	Venezuela	5	2	3	26	36	−10	.400	3	
6	Dominican Republic	5	0	5	20	42	−22	.000	5	

(H) Hosts
Notes:

Date	Local time	Road team	Score	Home team	Inn.	Venue	Game duration	Attendance	Boxscore
November 8	19:08	South Korea	0–5	Japan		Sapporo Dome	3:37	28,848	
November 10	12:05	Mexico	6–4	Venezuela		Taoyuan Int'l Baseball Stadium	2:58	800	
November 10	18:05	Dominican Republic	5–11	United States		Taoyuan Int'l Baseball Stadium	3:02	500	
November 11	12:05	Venezuela	7–5	United States		Taoyuan Int'l Baseball Stadium	3:20	500	
November 11	18:00	South Korea	10–1	Dominican Republic		Taoyuan Int'l Baseball Stadium	3:56	600	
November 11	18:08	Mexico	5–6	Japan		Tianmu Baseball Stadium	3:36	6,523	
November 12	12:00	Venezuela	2–13	South Korea	7	Taoyuan Int'l Baseball Stadium	2:51	1,010	
November 12	18:05	United States	10–0	Mexico	8	Tianmu Baseball Stadium	2:47	531	
November 12	18:08	Japan	4–2	Dominican Republic		Taoyuan Int'l Baseball Stadium	3:02	3,500	
November 14	12:00	Dominican Republic	6–8	Venezuela		Taoyuan Int'l Baseball Stadium	2:59	1,112	
November 14	18:00	South Korea	4–3	Mexico		Tianmu Baseball Stadium	3:30	2,500	
November 14	18:08	Japan	10–2	United States		Taoyuan Int'l Baseball Stadium	3:27	10,437	
November 15	12:05	Mexico	9–6	Dominican Republic		Taoyuan Int'l Baseball Stadium	3:21	1,000	
November 15	18:00	United States	3–2	South Korea	10	Tianmu Baseball Stadium	4:08	2,000	
November 15	18:08	Venezuela	5–6	Japan		Taoyuan Int'l Baseball Stadium	3:22	6,547	

== Playoff stage ==
Quarterfinals
B4	Mexico	4
A1	Canada	3
A3	Netherlands	1
B2	United States	6
B3	South Korea	7
A2	Cuba	2
A4	Puerto Rico	3
B1	Japan	9

Semifinals
B4	Mexico	1
B2	United States	6
B3	South Korea	4
B1	Japan	3

Gold Medal
B2	United States	0
B3	South Korea	8
Bronze Medal
B4	Mexico	1
B1	Japan	11

=== Quarterfinals ===
Date	Local time	Road team	Score	Home team	Inn.	Venue	Game duration	Attendance	Boxscore
November 16	12:30	Mexico	4–3	Canada		Intercontinental Baseball Stadium	2:43	250	
November 16	12:30	Netherlands	1–6	United States		Taoyuan Int'l Baseball Stadium	2:56	503	
November 16	18:30	South Korea	7–2	Cuba		Intercontinental Baseball Stadium	3:30	370	
November 16	18:30	Puerto Rico	3–9	Japan		Taoyuan Int'l Baseball Stadium	3:14	8,000	

Though Canada led Group A with a 5–0 record, they were upset in the quarterfinals by Mexico. Zack Segovia led the United States to a victory over the Netherlands. South Korea defeated Cuba, taking a 5–0 lead over Cuba by the second inning. Japan defeated Puerto Rico behind the pitching of Kenta Maeda.

=== Semifinals ===
Date	Local time	Road team	Score	Home team	Inn.	Venue	Game duration	Attendance	Boxscore
November 19	19:00	South Korea	4–3	Japan		Tokyo Dome	3:50	40,258	
November 20	19:00	Mexico	1–6	United States		Tokyo Dome	3:07	5,105	

South Korea had lost to Japan in round-robin play. Japan led their semifinal matchup 3–0 going into the ninth inning, but South Korea scored four runs in the final inning to defeat Japan. Meanwhile, the United States defeated Mexico 6–1, scoring four runs in the fifth inning, to advance to the championship round.

=== Third place game ===
Date	Local time	Road team	Score	Home team	Inn.	Venue	Game duration	Attendance	Boxscore
November 21	13:00	Mexico	1–11	Japan	7	Tokyo Dome	2:26	N.A.	

In the third place game, Japan defeated Mexico 11–1, with the game ending after seven innings due to the mercy rule. Japan's Tetsuto Yamada hit two home runs, and Sho Nakata and Nobuhiro Matsuda each hit a home run, and the score was 8–0 after two innings.

=== Championship ===
November 21, 2015 19:00 at Tokyo Dome
Team	1	2	3	4	5	6	7	8	9	R	H	E
South Korea	1	0	1	5	0	0	0	0	1	8	13	0
United States	0	0	0	0	0	0	0	0	0	0	5	0
WP: Kim Kwang-hyun (1–1) LP: Zack Segovia (2–1); Home runs: KOR: Park Byung-ho (2, in 4th, 3 RBI); USA: None; Attendance: 40,411 Game Time: 3:39; Boxscore

In the championship game, Lee Yong-kyu of South Korea recorded a run batted in (RBI) double in the first inning off of Zack Segovia. Kim Hyun-soo had an RBI double in the third inning, and scored two more runs on a double in the fourth inning. Park Byung-ho hit a home run off of Brooks Pounders to left field in the fourth inning. Kim finished the game three hits, including two doubles that scored runs. Kim Hyun-soo and Jeong Keun-woo also had three hits apiece, and Jeong recorded a run batted in with a bases loaded walk in the ninth inning.

The United States had defeated South Korea during their sole matchup during group play by a score of 3–2 in extra innings. Kim later explained that the South Korean team made adjustments to better prepare for the fastballs thrown by United States pitchers. Before the game, United States players Brett Eibner, J. B. Wendelken, and Jake Barrett became ineligible to play in the championship game as they had been added to the 40-man rosters of their respective Major League Baseball organizations.

== Final standings ==
Rk	Team	W	L	Tiebreaker
1	South Korea	6	2	
Lost in Final
2	United States	5	3	
Lost in Semifinals
3	Japan	7	1	
4	Mexico	3	5	
Lost in Quarterfinals
5	Canada	5	1	
6	Cuba	3	3	
7	Netherlands	3	3	
8	Puerto Rico	2	4	
Eliminated in Group stage
9	Chinese Taipei	2	3	+0.054 TQB
10	Venezuela	2	3	−0.238 TQB
11	Dominican Republic	0	5	−0.532 TQB
12	Italy	0	5	−0.782 TQB

2015 WBSC Premier 12

South Korea
1st title

== Awards ==
After the tournament, the WBSC announced the Premier12 All-World Team and individual awards winners.

All-World Team
Position	Player
Starting Pitcher	(Japan) Shohei Ohtani
Relief Pitcher	(Canada) Dustin Molleken
Catcher	(Mexico) Humberto Sosa
First Baseman	(Japan) Sho Nakata
Second Baseman	(United States) Adam Frazier
Third Baseman	(South Korea) Hwang Jae-gyun
Shortstop	(Netherlands) Carlton Daal
Outfielders	(Netherlands) Randolph Oduber (United States) Matt McBride (South Korea) Kim Hyun-soo
Designated Hitter	(South Korea) Lee Dae-ho

Individual Awards
Award	Player
Most Valuable Player	(South Korea) Kim Hyun-soo
Outstanding Defensive Player	(Japan) Hayato Sakamoto

== Prize money ==
The WBSC announced that it would be giving away $3,800,000 in prize money to participants, distributed as follows:

- Winner: US$1,000,000
- 2nd Place: US$600,000
- 3rd place: US$400,000
- 4th place: US$300,000
- 5–8th place: US$225,000 each
- 9–12th place: US$150,000 each

== Controversies ==
Despite South Korea's victory in the entire tournament, many South Korean fans and officials were angered and complaining of how the 2015 WBSC Premier League was heavily biased in favor of the co-host nation Japan's team, and that they purposefully set up in advance of Korea's team under disadvantage by restraining them from practicing and giving them rather complicated schedules and obstacles (that including of a stadium fire) that other countries did not needed to go through or have. The Korea Baseball Organization (KBO) was also under fire for not doing enough to solve the issues of Japan's favorable play in the tournament. Jeong Keum Jo, KBO's representative official, stated that the KBO has numerously filed a complaint to Japan of the corrupt play, but was only advised to understand that the premier league had to be successful, and so was dismissed.

Additional claims are that Japan purposefully pulled the semifinal match schedule to Thursday as a last-minute change when it was announced that South Korea was going to be Japan's opponent; sponsorship and money is said to be the reason of the schedule change. This meant that Korean players were to wake up at 3:30 am to take the flight from Taiwan to Japan, while Japanese players were able to rest and practice more during that time. Korea claims this was to purposefully tire the Korean team ahead of the game. On top of that, further criticism came in when Japan had organized Koda Kawaguchi, a Japanese umpire for the game that of between South Korea and Japan, as it was considered to be a further sign of pro-Japan bias during the tournament. When the game ended with an unexpected South Korean victory, Japan's television networks moved the tournament broadcasting time from 7 PM to 3:45 AM, causing stir in South Korea once more pointing out of how it was unnecessary to do such, and that it was to show fewer people of the highlights.

== See also ==
- List of sporting events in Taiwan
