= Yandy Díaz =

Cuban baseball player (born 1991)

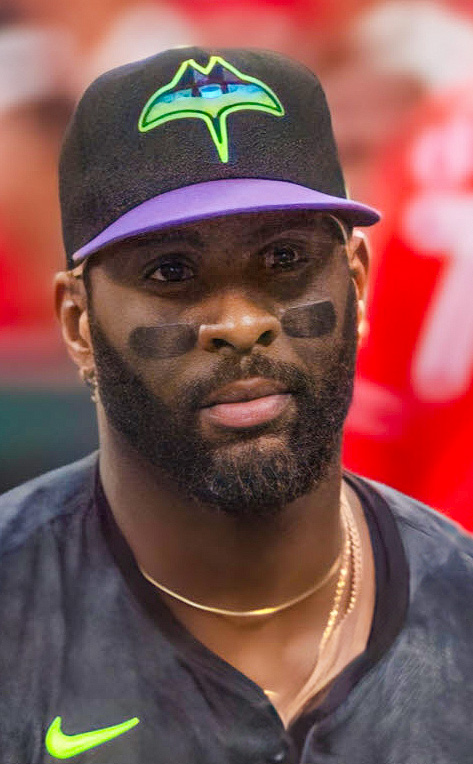
- Díaz with the Tampa Bay Rays in 2024

Tampa Bay Rays – No. 2
- First baseman / Third baseman / Designated hitter
- Born: August 8, 1991 (age 35); Sagua La Grande, Villa Clara, Cuba
- Bats: Right Throws: Right

MLB debut
- April 3, 2017, for the Cleveland Indians

MLB statistics (through 2026 season)
- Batting average: .291
- Home runs: 122
- Runs batted in: 509
- Stats at Baseball Reference

Teams
- Cleveland Indians (2017–2018); Tampa Bay Rays (2019–present)

Career highlights and awards
- 2× All-Star (2023, 2026); Silver Slugger Award (2023); AL batting champion (2023)

Yandy Díaz Fernández (born August 8, 1991) is a Cuban-born professional baseball first baseman, third baseman and designated hitter for the Tampa Bay Rays of Major League Baseball (MLB). He has previously played in MLB for the Cleveland Indians. Díaz has won one Silver Slugger Award and is a two-time All-Star.

== Cuban career ==
Díaz began his career with the Naranjas de Villa Clara in the 2008-09 Cuban National Series; at 16 years old, he registered two hits and two walks over seven plate appearances. The next year with Villa Clara, he slashed .292/.417/.351 in 67 games. In his final season with Villa Clara, he slashed .254/.399/.331 in 59 games. He was not included on the roster for the 2012–13 season, which saw Villa Clara win the championship.

== American career ==
=== Cleveland Indians ===
==== Minor leagues ====
In 2013, at 21 years old, Díaz defected from Holguin, Cuba, to Monte Cristi, Dominican Republic, alongside his childhood friend Leandro Linares and another unnamed individual. He had made two prior attempts to defect, but had been caught and arrested by the Cuban government on both occasions. On September 20, 2013, Díaz signed with the Cleveland Indians for $300,000.

Díaz played for the Carolina Mudcats of the High–A Carolina League in 2014. Playing for the Akron RubberDucks of the Double–A Eastern League in 2015, Díaz was named an All-Star. The Indians promoted him to the Columbus Clippers of the Triple–A International League in September, and assigned him to the Arizona Fall League after the 2015 regular season. Díaz began the 2016 season with Akron and was subsequently promoted to Columbus, where he won the International League Rookie of the Year Award.

In the 2016–17 winter league baseball season, Díaz played for the Leones del Caracas of the Venezuelan Professional Baseball League. He posted a .371/.451/.510 slash line in 151 at-bats, knocking two home runs and 18 RBIs.

==== Major leagues ====
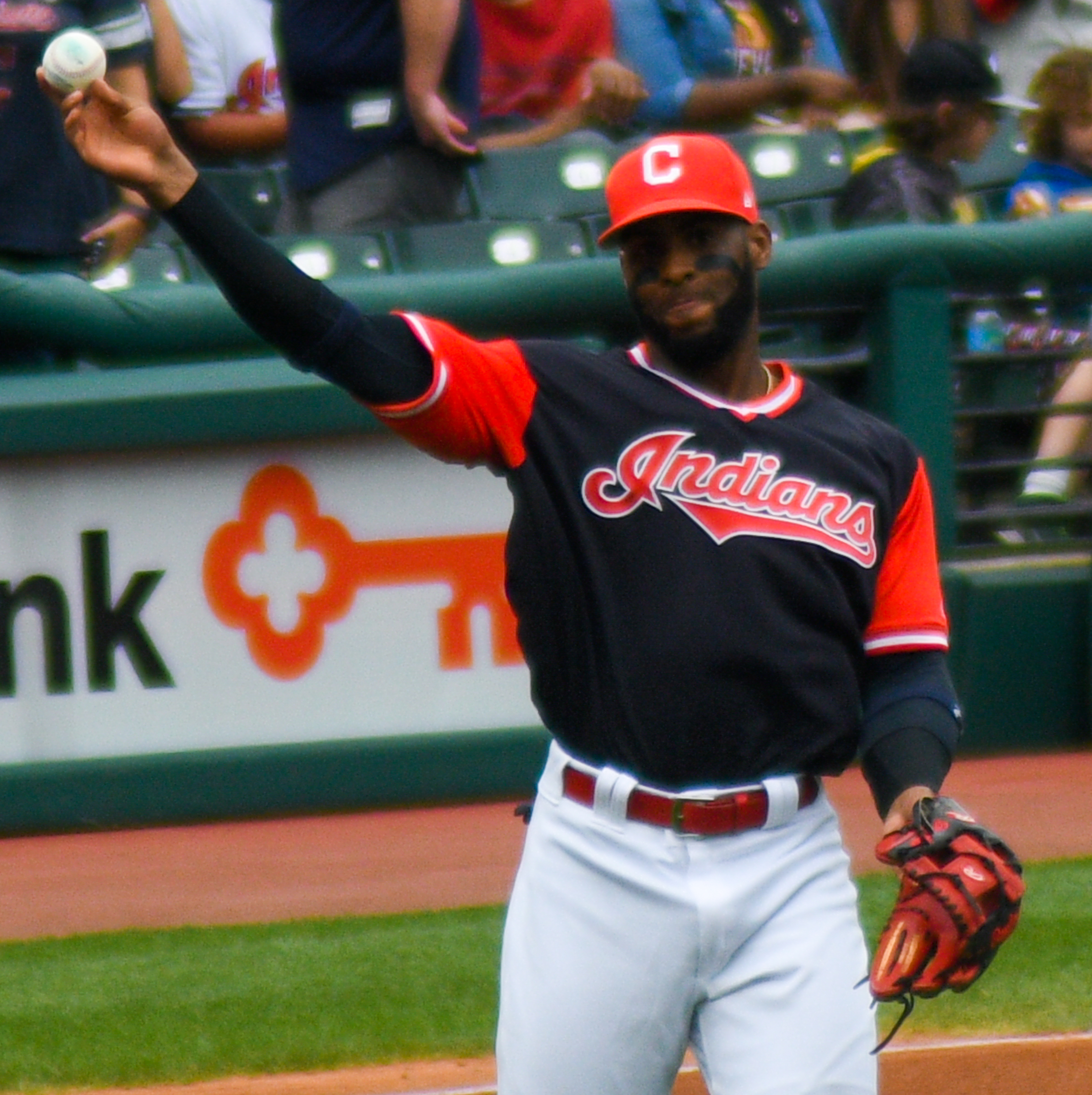
Diaz with the Indians in 2017.

Díaz earned a non-roster invitation to the Indians' 2017 major league spring training camp. After batting .458 (22-for-48) with a 1.252 OPS during spring training, and after injuries to other players forced the Indians to adjust their roster, Díaz was named the Indians' starting third baseman for the start of the 2017 season. Diaz played 49 games, slashing .262/.352/.327 predominantly playing third base.

Diaz spent the 2018 season between Columbus and the Indians, playing 39 games and slashing .312/.375/.422 with one home run and 15 RBI.

=== Tampa Bay Rays ===
On December 13, 2018, the Indians traded Díaz to the Tampa Bay Rays in a three-team trade in which the Rays also acquired Cole Sulser for Jake Bauers, and the Seattle Mariners acquired Edwin Encarnación from the Indians for Carlos Santana. Díaz missed some time due to injury during the season, only accumulating 307 at–bats. He did hit 14 home runs while driving in 38 runs. Díaz hit two home runs in the 2019 American League Wild Card Game as the Rays defeated the Oakland Athletics.

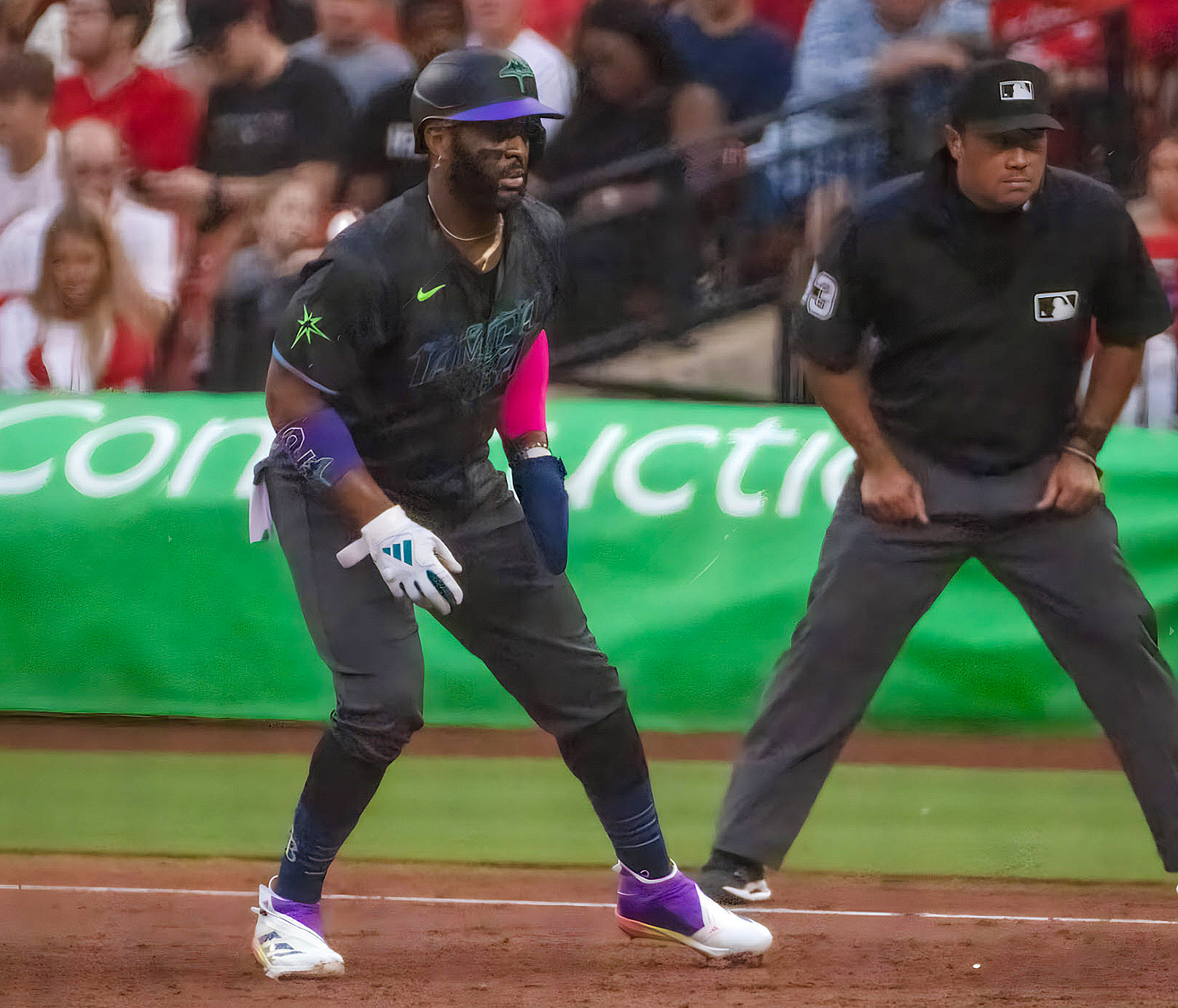
Diaz during a 2024 game in St. Louis

Although plagued by a hamstring injury in September 2020, Díaz appeared in 34 games of the abbreviated 2020 season, slashing .307/.428/.386 with two home runs and 11 RBI.

In the 2022 season, Díaz hit .296/.401/.423, leading the Rays in on-base percentage (.401), OPS (.824), and OPS+ (142), and finished second only to Harold Ramírez in batting average. He received MVP votes for the first time in his career, finishing in a tie for 20th in voting.

On January 31, 2023, Díaz signed a three–year, $24 million contract extension with the Rays. Díaz was named to his first All-Star Game in 2023, when he was elected the American League starter at first base. In his first at-bat, he hit a solo home run to put the AL up 1–0, becoming the first Rays starter to homer in an All-Star Game and the first Cuban-born player to do so since Cookie Rojas in 1972. Diaz and his wife welcomed their first son the day after the All-Star Game. Diaz therefore flew into Seattle the morning of the All-Star Game, and flew back immediately afterward. He was officially placed on the paternity list on July 14. Díaz led the AL in batting average (beating out Corey Seager on the last day of the season) and in batting average on balls in play (.367), as he hit .330/.410/.522 with 22 home runs and 78 runs batted in. In doing so, he became the third Cuban-born player to win a batting title, after Tony Oliva and Yuli Gurriel. Díaz finished 6th in AL MVP voting and also won the 2023 Silver Slugger Award for AL first basemen.

In 2024, Díaz had a 20-game hitting streak, breaking Jason Bartlett's record for the longest streak in Rays history. For the season, he hit .281/.341/.414 with 14 home runs and 65 runs batted in. Díaz was announced as part of FEPCUBE's "Patria y Vida" team of expatriate Cuban ballplayers participating in the inaugural Intercontinental Series in Barranquilla, Colombia.

On March 14, 2025, the Rays announced that the team option for the 2026 season on Díaz's contract had been picked up, and that a vesting option for 2027 had been added. For the 2025 season, Díaz batted .300/.366/.482 with 25 home runs and 83 RBIs.

On May 7, 2026, Díaz doubled off of Boston Red Sox pitcher Jake Bennett for his 1,000th career hit, becoming the 20th Cuban–born player to achieve the feat. Díaz finished the 2026 season batting .293/.359/.446 with 22 home runs, 85 RBIs, and an AL-leading 180 base hits.

== Personal life ==
His father, Jorge, also defected from Cuba to play professional baseball in the United States. Jorge Díaz briefly played in the Texas Rangers organization and spent the rest of his career in independent leagues. Yandy was six years old when he last saw his father. Diaz is of Afro-Cuban descent.

Díaz and his wife, Mayisleidis, have a son born in July 2023.

== See also ==
- List of baseball players who defected from Cuba
