= Lourdes Gurriel Jr. =

Cuban and American baseball player (born 1993)

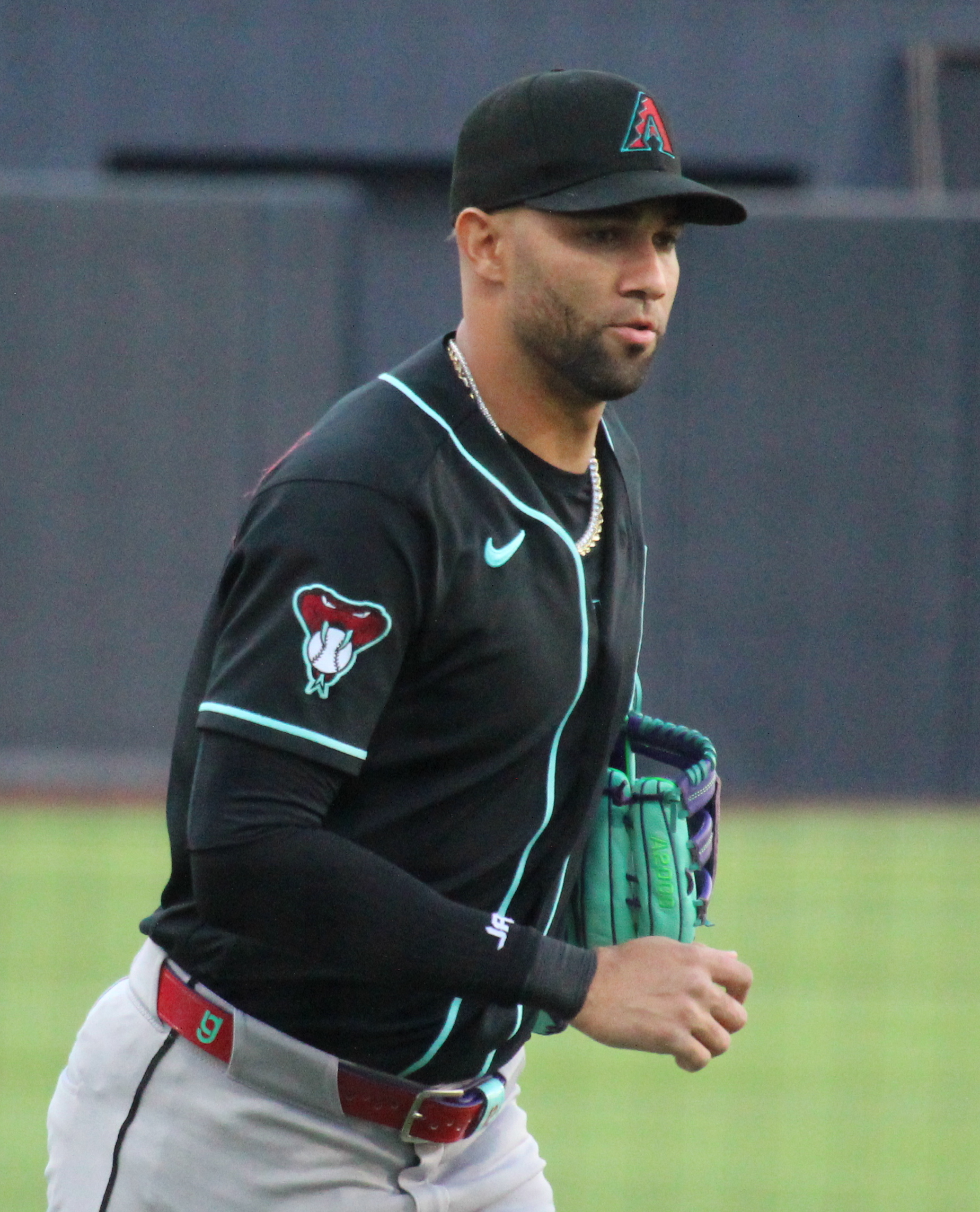
- Gurriel with the Arizona Diamondbacks in 2026

Free agent
- Left fielder
- Born: October 10, 1993 (age 33); Sancti Spíritus, Cuba
- Bats: Right Throws: Right

MLB debut
- April 20, 2018, for the Toronto Blue Jays

MLB statistics (through 2026 season)
- Batting average: .271
- Home runs: 131
- Runs batted in: 513
- Stats at Baseball Reference

Teams
- Toronto Blue Jays (2018–2022); Arizona Diamondbacks (2023–2026)

Career highlights and awards
- All-Star (2023)
Medals
Men’s baseball
Representing Cuba
Central American and Caribbean Games
Gold medal – first place	2014 Veracruz	National Team
World Port Tournament
Gold medal – first place	2015 Netherlands	National team

Lourdes Yunielki Gurriel Castillo Jr. (born October 10, 1993) is a Cuban and American professional baseball left fielder who is a free agent. He has previously played in Major League Baseball (MLB) for the Toronto Blue Jays and Arizona Diamondbacks. He also played for Sancti Spíritus and the Industriales of the Cuban National Series before defecting from Cuba.

Following his defection, Gurriel was ranked as one of the top international prospects before signing with the Blue Jays in 2016. He made his MLB debut with Toronto in 2018 before being traded to the Diamondbacks prior to the 2023 season. In his first season with Arizona, he was named to his first MLB All-Star Game and helped the team reach the 2023 World Series.

== Professional career ==
=== Cuban National Series ===
Gurriel debuted in the Cuban National Series with Sancti Spíritus in 2010 as a 16-year-old. Used as a pinch hitter, Gurriel batted .200 in 15 at-bats over 16 games. The following season, Gurriel appeared in 55 games and batted .227 with three home runs and 16 runs batted in (RBI). In his final season with Sancti Spíritus, Gurriel hit .253 with four home runs and 32 RBI in 67 games.

In 2013 Gurriel joined the Industriales, playing 45 games and hitting .218 with one home run and 17 RBI. Prior to the start of the 2014 season, Gurriel represented Cuba at the 2014 Central American and Caribbean Games, earning the gold medal. He appeared in 63 games in 2014 and greatly improved upon his 2013 campaign, batting .308 with eight home runs and 42 RBI. With the Industriales in 2015, Gurriel hit .344 with 10 home runs and 53 RBI. After the Cuban League season, Gurriel agreed to a contract with the Yokohama DeNA BayStars of Nippon Professional Baseball (NPB), but did not appear in any games for the team and was placed on the restricted list.

In February 2016, Gurriel and his brother Yulieski defected after competing in the Caribbean Series in the Dominican Republic.

=== Toronto Blue Jays ===
In August 2016, Gurriel was declared a free agent by Major League Baseball (MLB), and ranked as the sixth best international prospect available. In September, he held a showcase of his skills at Rod Carew Stadium in Panama that was attended by 60 MLB scouts. On November 12, Gurriel signed a seven-year, $22 million contract with the Toronto Blue Jays. Gurriel took part in spring training with the Blue Jays, and was assigned to the Dunedin Blue Jays of the High-A Florida State League on March 17, 2017. Gurriel began the season on the disabled list with a leg injury. He made his minor league debut on April 18, but left the game with a recurrence of the same injury. On July 12, Gurriel was promoted to the New Hampshire Fisher Cats of the Double-A Eastern League after appearing in 18 games for Dunedin. In total, Gurriel played in 64 games in 2017 and hit .229 with five home runs and 36 RBI. He played for the Peoria Javelinas of the Arizona Fall League (AFL) during the offseason.

Gurriel began the 2018 season with New Hampshire. He batted .347 in 12 games, and was promoted to the major leagues on April 20. In his debut that night, Gurriel recorded two singles and three RBI. On April 28, Gurriel hit his first career home run, against Bartolo Colón of the Texas Rangers. On July 27, Gurriel recorded his first multi-home run game by hitting two home runs in a 10–5 win over the Chicago White Sox. By collecting a pair of singles in Toronto's game against the White Sox the following night, Gurriel became the first rookie in baseball's modern era to have 10 consecutive multi-hit games. The last rookie to accomplish this feat was Shoeless Joe Jackson in 1911. On July 29, Gurriel broke Jackson's rookie record with his 11th consecutive multi-hit game. Jackson also set the overall AL record with an 11-game multi-hit streak in 1912. Simultaneous with breaking Jackson's 1911 rookie record, Gurriel also tied Jackson's all-time AL record. However, on his third hit of the game on July 29, Gurriel was injured, and was subsequently put on the disabled list. On September 25, Gurriel was shut down for the rest of the season with a sore left hamstring.

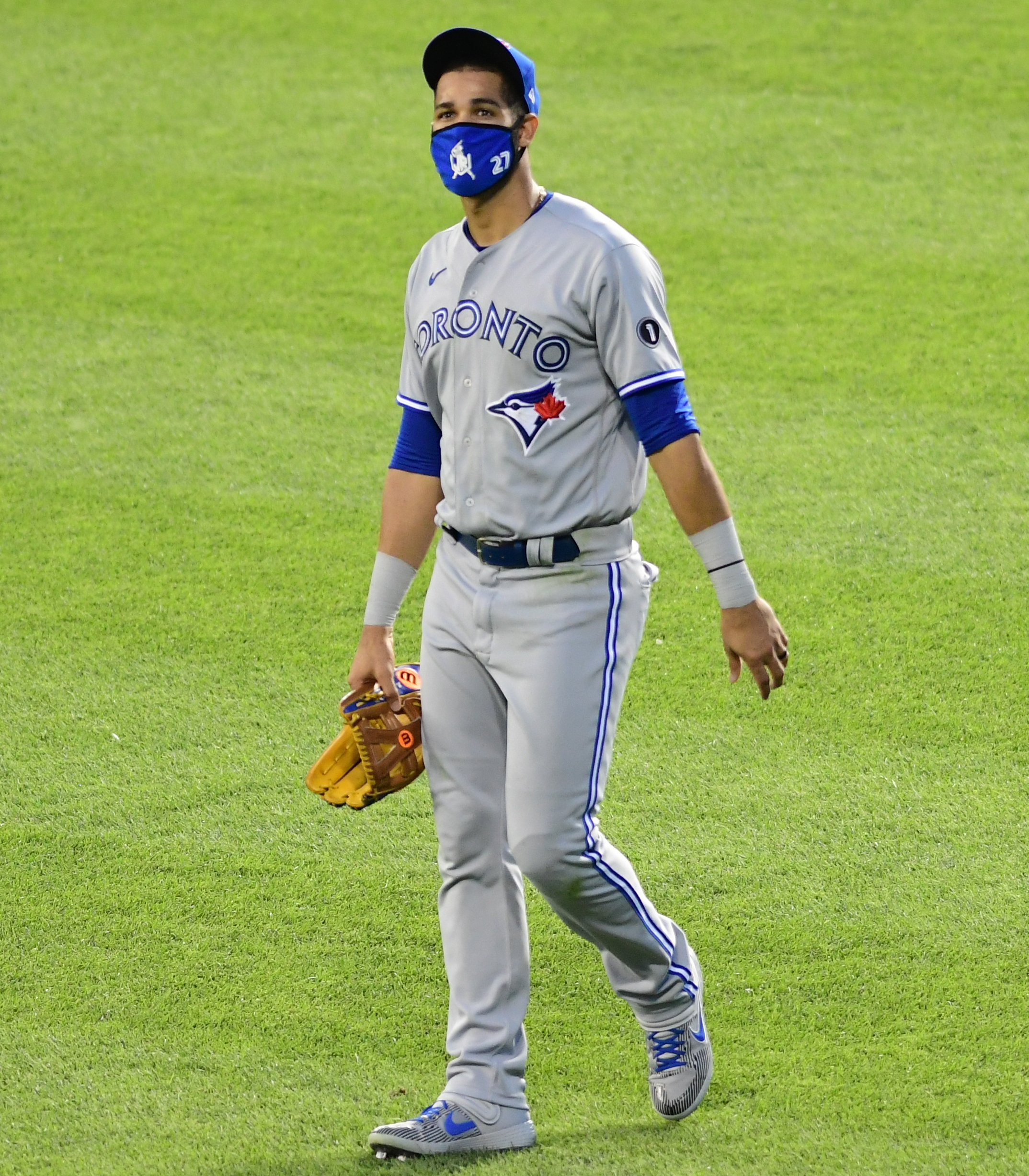
Gurriel Jr. in 2020

After starting the 2019 season hitting .175 in 13 games and struggling with throws from second base, the Blue Jays optioned Gurriel to the Buffalo Bisons of the Triple-A International League. At Buffalo, Gurriel began playing as an outfielder. On offense, he finished the 2019 hitting .277 with 20 home runs in 84 games for the Blue Jays. On defense, he led all major league left fielders in assists, with 9.

Overall with the 2020 Blue Jays, Gurriel batted .308 with 11 home runs and 33 RBI in 57 games, and was named one of three finalists for the Gold Glove. In 2021, Gurriel set career highs on offense, hitting .276 with 21 home runs and 84 RBI in 141 games with Toronto. He also set a club record for most grand slams(4) in a season, including a game-tying slam against the Oakland Athletics on September 5. He also led all left fielders with 12 assists and was named a finalist for the Gold Glove Award for the second consecutive year.

On July 22, 2022, in a game in which the Blue Jays defeated the Boston Red Sox 28–5, Gurriel recorded six hits with five RBI. The accomplishment matched the franchise single-game record for hits, tying Frank Catalanotto who achieved the feat in 2004.

=== Arizona Diamondbacks ===
On December 23, 2022, the Blue Jays traded Gurriel and Gabriel Moreno to the Arizona Diamondbacks in exchange for Daulton Varsho. Gurriel was named an All-Star for the first time in his MLB career on July 2, 2023, and finished the season with a .261/.309/.463 batting line, 24 home runs, and 82 RBI. He became a free agent following the season.

On December 22, 2023, Gurriel re-signed with Arizona on a three-year, $42 million contract. Gurriel was announced as part of FEPCUBE's "Patria y Vida" team of expatriate Cuban ballplayers participating in the inaugural Intercontinental Series in Barranquilla, Colombia. Gurriel appeared in 133 contests for Arizona in the 2024 campaign, slashing .279/.322/.435 with 18 home runs and 75 RBI.

Gurriel made 129 appearances for the Diamondbacks during the 2025 season, batting .248/.295/.418 with 19 home runs, 80 RBI, and 10 stolen bases. On September 2, 2025, it was announced that Gurriel would miss the remainder of the season after suffering a torn ACL in his right knee. Gurriel returned to the active roster on April 18, 2026. The Diamondbacks designated Gurriel for assignment on September 13, 2026. He was released on September 18.

== Personal life ==
Gurriel's older brother, Yuli, also played in Cuba before defecting, and they are sons of former Cuban National Series player Lourdes Gourriel. Yuli later signed with the Houston Astros. Lourdes Jr.'s family lives in Miami, Florida.

Lourdes and Yuli made baseball history on September 21, 2018, when each hit two home runs, becoming the first brothers to have multi-homer performances on the same day.

Gurriel became a United States citizen on May 8, 2023.

== See also ==
- List of baseball players who defected from Cuba
- List of Major League Baseball players from Cuba
- List of Major League Baseball single-game hits leaders
- List of other second-generation Major League Baseball personnel
- List of Toronto Blue Jays team records
