= Yuli Gurriel =

Cuban baseball player (born 1984)

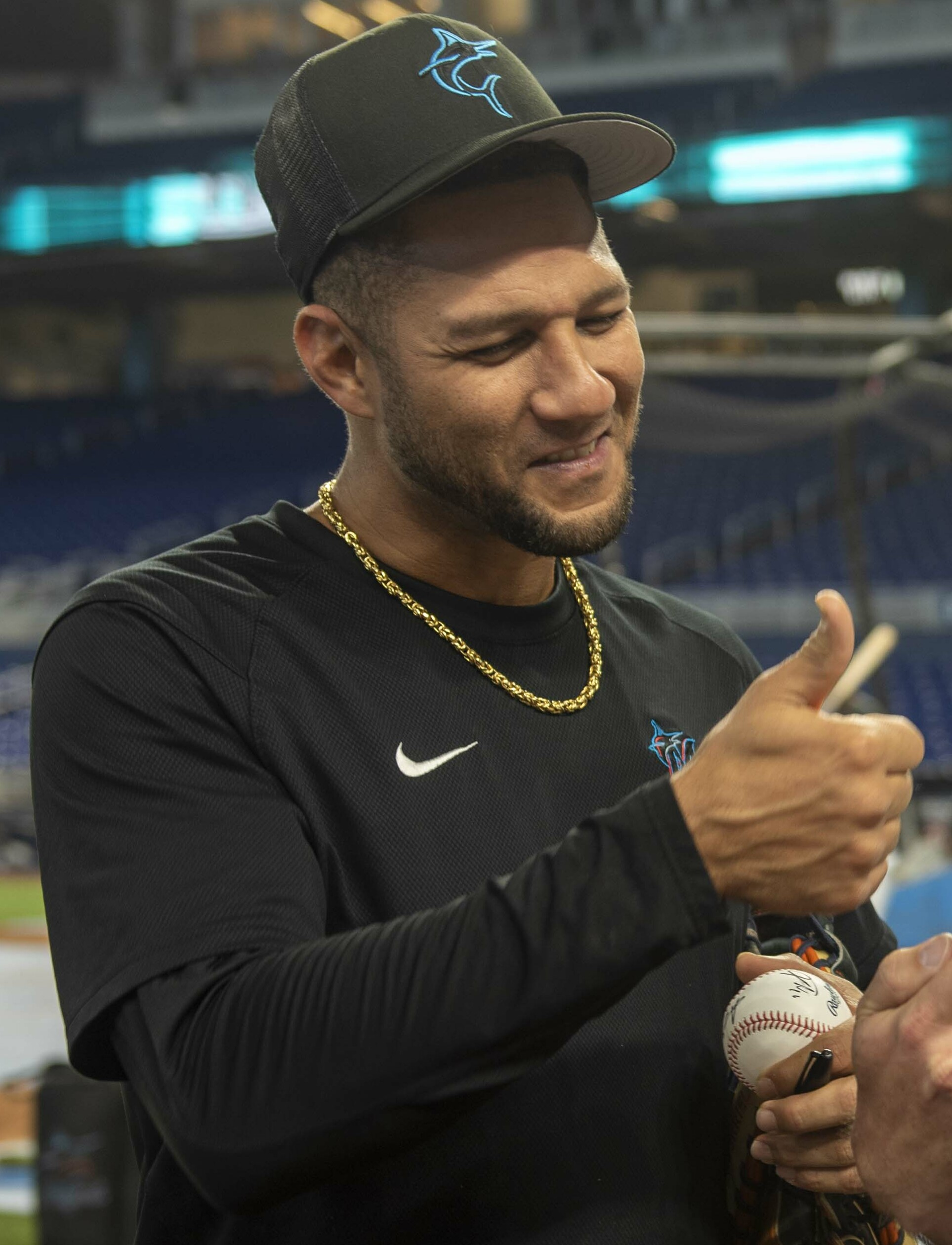
- Gurriel with the Miami Marlins in 2023

Free agent
- First baseman
- Born: June 9, 1984 (age 42); Sancti Spíritus, Cuba
- Bats: Right Throws: Right

Professional debut
- NPB: June 8, 2014, for the Yokohama DeNA BayStars
- MLB: August 21, 2016, for the Houston Astros

NPB statistics (through 2015 season)
- Batting average: .305
- Hits: 73
- Home runs: 11
- Runs batted in: 30

MLB statistics (through 2025 season)
- Batting average: .278
- Hits: 956
- Home runs: 98
- Runs batted in: 471
- Stats at Baseball Reference

Teams
- Yokohama DeNA BayStars (2014–2015); Houston Astros (2016–2022); Miami Marlins (2023); Kansas City Royals (2024); San Diego Padres (2025)

Career highlights and awards
- MLB: 2x World Series champion (2017, 2022); Gold Glove Award (2021); AL batting champion (2021); International: All-World Baseball Classic Team (2006)
Medals
Men's baseball
Representing Cuba
World Baseball Classic
Silver medal – second place	2006 San Diego	Team
Olympic Games
Gold medal – first place	2004 Athens	Team
Silver medal – second place	2008 Beijing	Team
Baseball World Cup
Gold medal – first place	2003 Havana	Team
Gold medal – first place	2005 Rotterdam	Team
Silver medal – second place	2007 Taipei	Team
Silver medal – second place	2009 Nettuno	Team
Silver medal – second place	2011 Panama City	Team
Intercontinental Cup
Gold medal – first place	2002 Havana	Team
Gold medal – first place	2006 Taichung	Team
Gold medal – first place	2010 Taichung	Team
Pan American Games
Gold medal – first place	2003 Santo Domingo	Team
Gold medal – first place	2007 Rio de Janeiro	Team
Bronze medal – third place	2011 Guadalajara	Team
Central American and Caribbean Games
Gold medal – first place	2006 Cartagena	Team
Gold medal – first place	2014 Veracruz	Team
World Port Tournament
Gold medal – first place	2013 Rotterdam	Team
World Junior Baseball Championship
Gold medal – first place	2002 Sherbrooke	Team

Yulieski Gurriel Castillo (born June 9, 1984), commonly known as Yuli Gurriel and nicknamed "La Piña", is a Cuban professional baseball first baseman who is a free agent. He has previously played in Major League Baseball (MLB) for the Houston Astros, Miami Marlins, Kansas City Royals, and San Diego Padres, and in Nippon Professional Baseball (NPB) for the Yokohama DeNA BayStars. Gurriel is a former member of Cuba's national team and an Olympic Games gold medalist in 2004.

The son of former Cuban player Lourdes Gourriel, Gurriel was regarded as the best player in Cuba in 2006. At the 2006 World Baseball Classic, MLB scouts projected that Gurriel would be a first-round draft pick were he eligible for the draft. He defected from Cuba in 2016 and made his major league debut that year.

In his first full MLB season, the 33-year old Gurriel helped lead the Astros to the 2017 World Series championship over the Los Angeles Dodgers, making him the fifth player to have won both an Olympic Games gold medal and a World Series title. He also helped lead the club to American League (AL) pennants over the New York Yankees in 2019 and 2022, as well as the Boston Red Sox in 2021. Gurriel won a second World Series title with the Astros over the Philadelphia Phillies in 2022.

In 2021, Gurriel won the AL batting title, becoming the second Cuban-born player to achieve this. At age 37, Gurriel tied Tony Gwynn (.372 in 1997), Barry Bonds (.370 in 2002), and George Brett (.329 in 1990) as the second oldest player in the divisional era (since 1969) to win a batting title; the only player who was older was Bonds, who also led the NL at age 39 in 2004. Gurriel was also the AL Gold Glove Award winner at first base in 2021, becoming the oldest player to win a Gold Glove at that position until Carlos Santana won the award at age 38 in 2024.

== Baseball career ==
=== Cuban National Series ===
Gurriel had a solid season during the 2004–05 Cuban National Series (CNS), leading the league in hits and runs scored. However, he truly dominated in 2005–06, leading the series in runs batted in (RBI), runs, and triples. His 27 home runs, which also led the league, were one short of the record of 28. Gurriel's batting average was .327, and his slugging percentage was .676. He played his Cuban career with Sancti Spíritus and Industriales of the Cuban National Series.

=== Yokohama DeNA BayStars ===
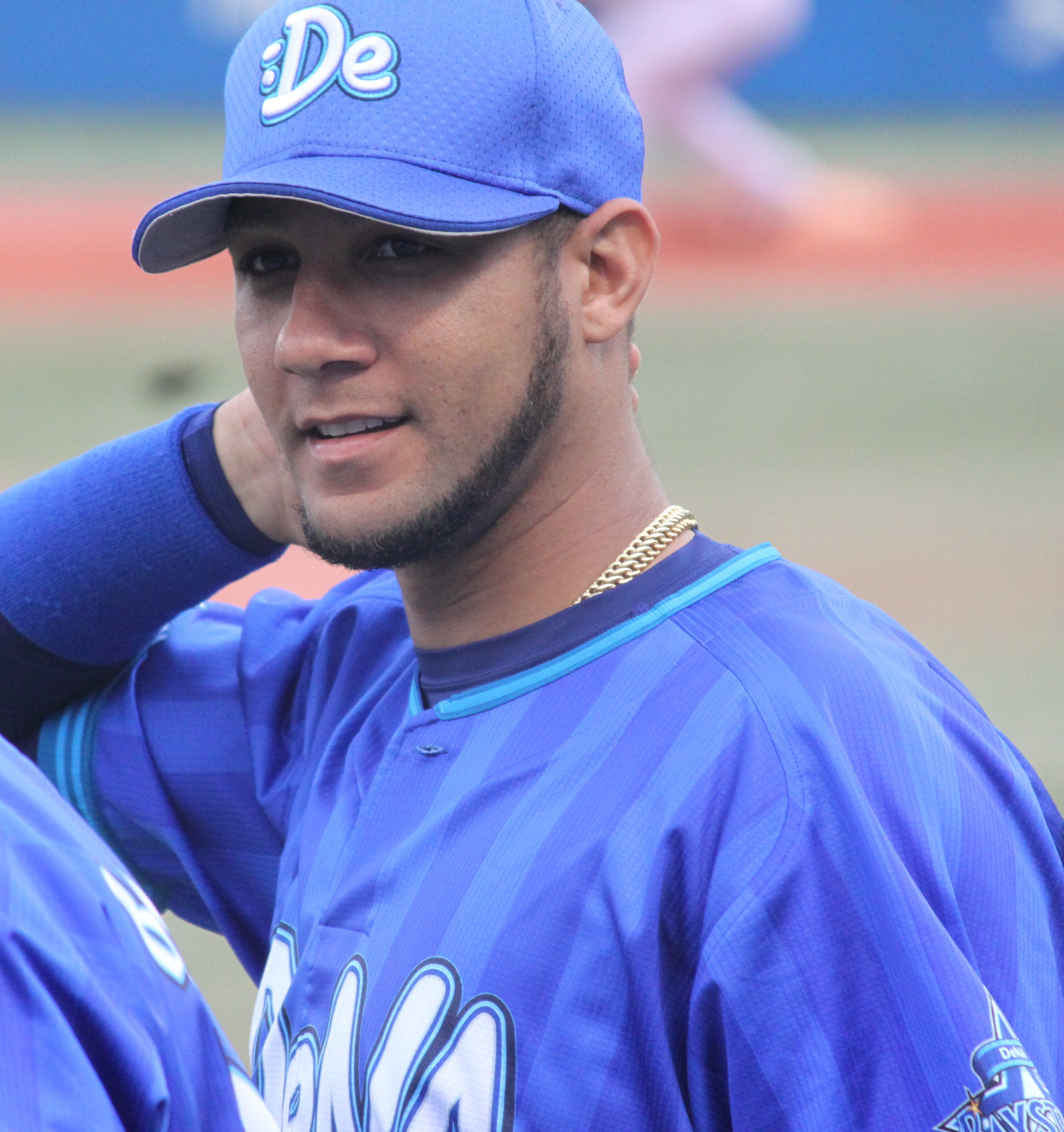
Gurriel at Meiji Jingu Stadium in 2014

On May 11, 2014, Gurriel signed a one-year contract with the Yokohama DeNA BayStars. He joined the team at midseason, and batted .305 with 11 home runs and 30 RBIs in 62 games.

==== Defection from Cuba ====
In February 2016, Gurriel and his then-22-year-old brother, Lourdes Jr., defected after competing in the Caribbean Series in the Dominican Republic and relocated to Haiti to establish residency. In Haiti in June 2016, Gurriel met future Houston Astros teammate Yordan Alvarez, who is also Cuban. In June, Major League Baseball declared Gurriel eligible to be signed by a major league team as a free agent.

Nearly 10 years prior, ESPN.com had erroneously reported that Gurriel and another Cuban national player, Eduardo Paret, had defected from Cuba and into Colombia. Gurriel refuted this claim on August 1, 2006, stating that he returned to his home in Cuba immediately after the tournament in which the Cuban national team had been playing.

"Cuban players have been systematically overhyped, but had Yulieski Gurriel defected at 21 rather than 31, he probably ends up in the Hall of Fame," said Joe Kehoskie, a former agent who followed Cuban baseball closely, in August 2016.

Gurriel's brother, Lourdes Jr., signed with the Toronto Blue Jays on November 12, 2016.

=== Houston Astros ===
==== Minor leagues and Major League debut (2016) ====
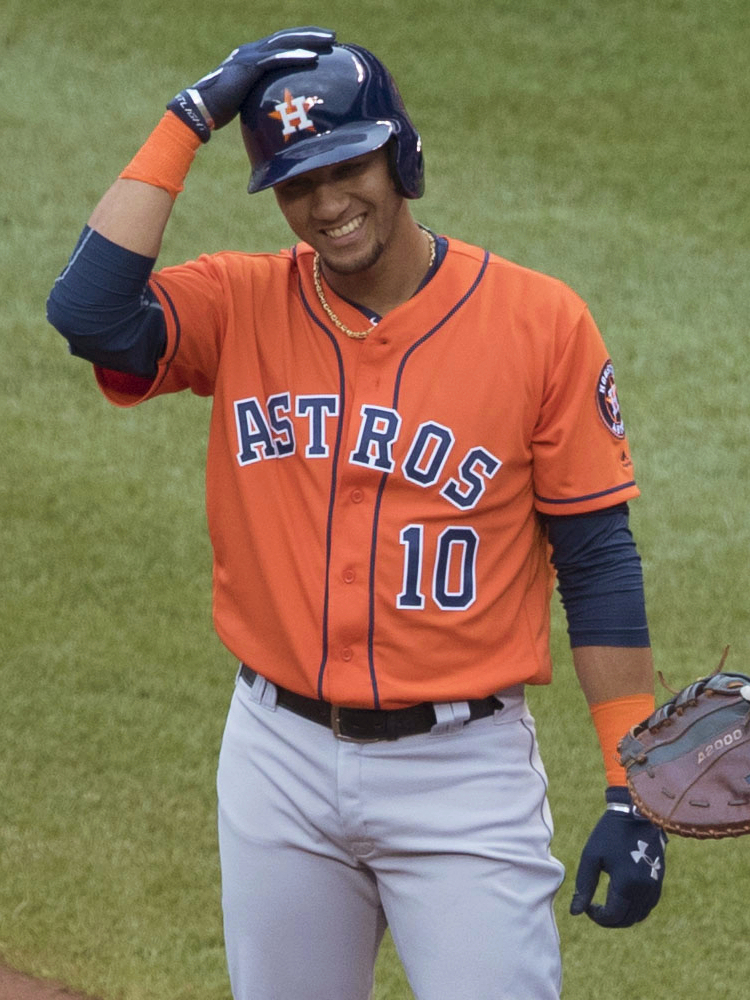
Gurriel with the Astros in 2016

On July 16, 2016, Gurriel signed a five-year, $47.5 million contract with the Houston Astros. He played in 15 games in the Astros' minor league system that year. He made his American debut in July with the Gulf Coast Astros of the Rookie-level Gulf Coast League, playing in two games. He was then promoted to the Lancaster JetHawks of the Class A-Advanced California League. After playing in four games for Lancaster, the Astros promoted Gurriel to the Corpus Christi Hooks of the Double-A Texas League. He batted 2-for-17 (.118) in five games for Corpus Christi, and was promoted to the Fresno Grizzlies of the Triple-A Pacific Coast League. He was recalled from Fresno to the major league roster on August 21. In his first 19 games with the Astros, he batted .344 with three home runs and eight runs batted in, playing mostly first and third base defensively.

==== World Series champion (2017) ====
Over 139 games in 2017, Gurriel batted .299/.332/.486 for a 121 adjusted OPS (OPS+). He hit 3 doubles, 18 home runs, 75 RBI and had 22 walks and 62 strikeouts. He finished seventh overall in the American League (AL) in doubles, second in at bats per strikeout (8.5), while seeing the fewest number of pitches per plate appearance in the major leagues (3.43). He led major league rookies in batting, ranked second among AL rookies in hits (158) and extra base hits (62), and third in runs (69) and OPS (.817). Gurriel set club rookie records for doubles and extra base hits—previously held by Hunter Pence (30 and 56, 2007); for slugging percentage—previously held by Jeff Bagwell (.437, 1991); and for total bases—previously held by Joe Morgan (251, 1965). Defensively, Gurriel ranked second among AL first basemen with 90 assists.

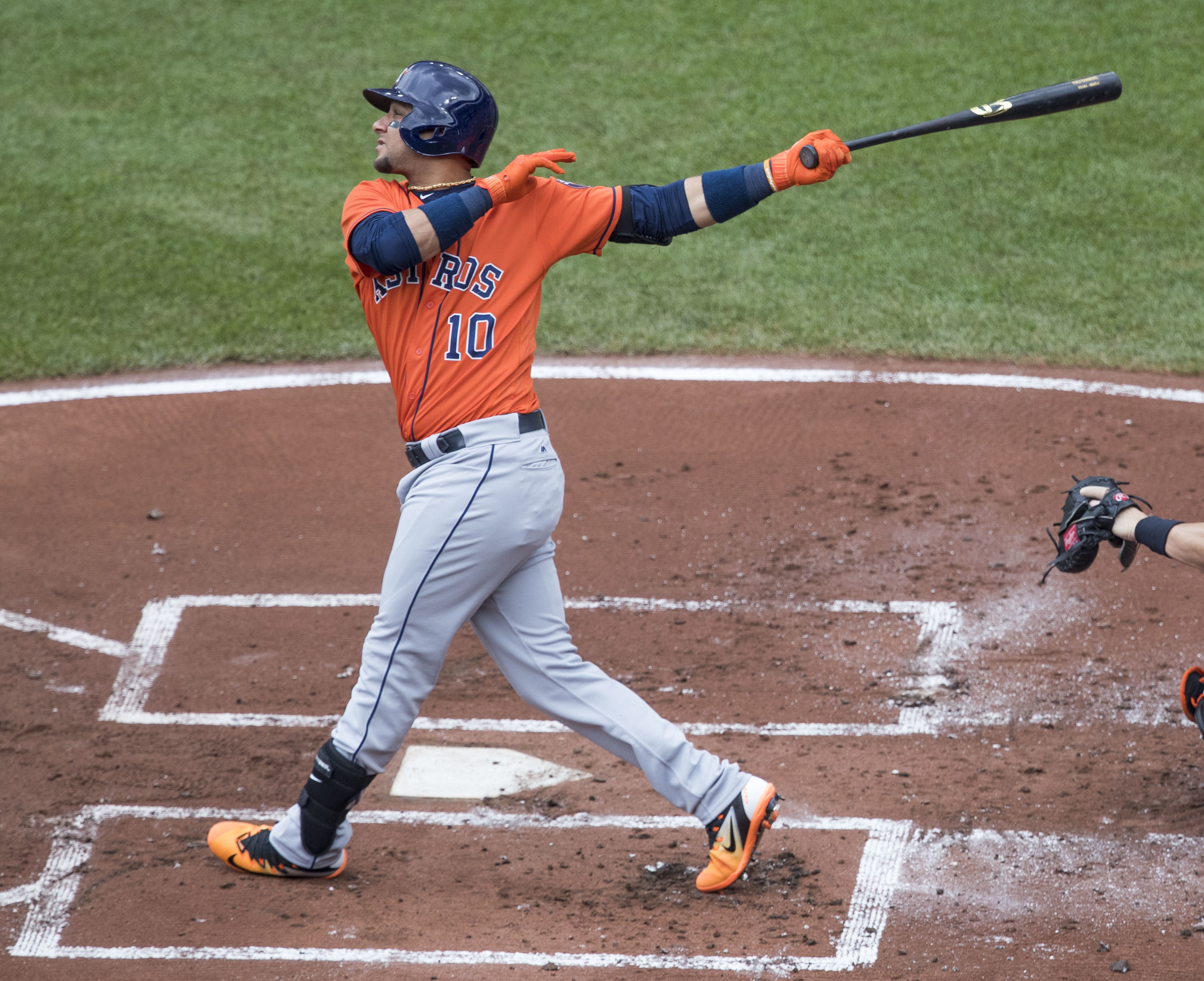
Gurriel in 2017

Gurriel placed fourth in the AL Rookie of the Year voting. The Houston chapter of the Baseball Writers' Association of America (BBWAA) named him the Astros Rookie of the Year.

In Game 3 of the World Series, Gurriel hit a home run off Japanese Los Angeles Dodgers pitcher Yu Darvish, and upon returning to the dugout, made a racist gesture mocking the pitcher. Gurriel was caught on camera stretching the sides of his eyes and mouthing the Spanish word chinito, which translates to "little Chinese Boy". Gurriel apologized and said that anyone from Asia is called a chino in Cuba, although he acknowledged that he knew the term was offensive from having played in Japan. Gurriel was suspended for the first five games of the 2018 season without pay but not for the World Series. He was required to undergo sensitivity training in the offseason. The Astros said that they would donate Gurriel's salary lost during the suspension to a charity that supports diversity efforts.

In Game 5, Gurriel hit a three-run home run off Dodgers star pitcher Clayton Kershaw in the fourth inning to tie the game 4–4; the Astros would go on to win 13–12. In Game 7, Gurriel faced Darvish again, and tipped his helmet before his at bat as a respectful gesture. The Astros won the game 5–1, giving them their first world championship in franchise history. Gurriel became the fifth player to have won both an Olympic gold medal and a World Series championship.

==== 2018–20 ====
After both hitting two home runs on September 21, 2018, Gurriel and his brother Lourdes, Jr., who was playing for the Toronto Blue Jays, became the first pair of brothers to achieve multi-home run games in the major leagues on the same day. Gurriel was named AL Player of the Week for the first time on September 23, having batted .462 with a .923 slugging percentage, three home runs, and 10 RBI. For the season, he batted .291/.323/.428. He hit .403 with runners in scoring position (RISP), the second-highest average in the major leagues behind Joe Mauer (.407). Gurriel set a new club record for average with RISP in one season, besting José Cruz' .389 average set in 1986.

Gurriel became the first Astro with a run and RBI in seven consecutive games and the fifth to homer in five consecutive games, on July 7, 2019, including a game-tying grand slam in doing so in an 11–10 win over the Los Angeles Angels. He won the AL Player of the Week Award for the week ending July 8, his second weekly honor, after homering in all five of the Astros games for a total of six, among nine hits and an OPS of 1.812. He went on to win the AL Player of the Month Award for July, his first time, after batting .398/.427/.837 SLG with 18 runs scored, seven doubles, 12 home runs, and 31 RBIs over 24 games. In a 14–3 romp over the Colorado Rockies on August 7, Gurriel homered and tied J. R. Towles with eight RBIs for the club record in one game.

Gurriel batted .298/.343./.541 in 2019, with 40 doubles, 31 home runs, 104 RBI, 65 strikeouts and 305 total bases, ranking fifth in the AL in doubles and ninth in RBI. He established career-highs in numerous categories, including in games played (144), on-base percentage, slugging percentage, OPS, runs (85), hits (168), home runs, RBI, and walks (37). At age 35, Gurriel became the oldest player in Astros history to produce 40+ doubles, 30+ HR and 100+ RBI in one season, surpassing Jeff Bagwell's age-33 campaign in 2001. Gurriel was the third-oldest player in MLB history to reach those milestones, after David Ortiz' 2016 season at age 40 and Vinny Castilla at age 36 in 2004.

In Game 7 of the 2019 World Series versus the Washington Nationals, Gurriel hit a second-inning solo home run off Max Scherzer to give the Astros a 1–0 lead. The Astros eventually lost the game, 6–2, as the Nationals earned their first championship. In the 2019 postseason, Gurriel batted .250, 18-for-72, with five strikeouts and a club-leading 13 RBI.

In 2020, Gurriel endured his most challenging season in the major leagues to that point. He batted .232/.274/.384 with 27 runs, six home runs, 22 RBI, and five sacrifice flies (tied for second in the AL) in 211 at bats, playing 55 games at first base and two at DH. In an expanded postseason format, he went 5-for-44, all singles, as the Tampa Bay Rays defeated the Astros in the ALCS.

On September 29, 2020, the Astros signed Gurriel to a one-year extension with a club option for 2022.

==== Batting champion and Gold Glove winner (2021) ====
Following the pandemic-shortened 2020 season, Gurriel lost 15 pounds (6.8 kg). On May 7, 2021, versus the Blue Jays, he recorded four hits, including one home run, and four RBIs. Through 31 games in the season, he had surpassed his RBI total (24) and walk total (16) in 2020 while batting .342/.420/.553 and leading the Astros with 12 multi-hit games and in RBIs. In the final game of the 2021 regular season, Gurriel hit a walk-off single to score Jason Castro and defeat the Oakland Athletics.

In 2021, Gurriel batted .319 to edge out teammate Michael Brantley and Blue Jay Vladimir Guerrero Jr. for the AL batting title. At age 37, he was the sixth-oldest player to win a batting title, the oldest to win their first batting title since Barry Bonds in 2002, and the first Cuban player since Tony Oliva in 1971. Gurriel tied for the major league lead in sacrifice flies, with 12. His final slash line included .319/.383/.462, 15 home runs, 81 RBIs, a career-best 59 walks and 68 strikeouts. He also led the Astros in on-base percentage (OBP, .383), hits (169), and walk-to-strikeout ratio (.868). On defense, Gurriel led all AL first basemen with 86 assists and ranked in the top five with five defensive runs saved, 1,147 total chances, 95 double plays and a .994 fielding percentage. He won his first career Gold Glove Award, becoming the second Astro to win the award at the position and first since Bagwell.

In the ALCS versus the Boston Red Sox, Gurriel batted .455/.520/.636, with 10 hits, one home run, one double, six RBI, one stolen base, three bases on balls, and one strikeout. In the World Series, Gurriel batted .273 with no home runs and two RBIs as the Astros lost to the Atlanta Braves in six games. Gurriel was, again, the final out of the series, grounding to Braves shortstop Dansby Swanson. This marked the third time Gurriel was the final out of a championship-clinching game. Game 6 also was the 73rd postseason start together for the infield unit of Gurriel, Jose Altuve, Alex Bregman, and Carlos Correa, which was more postseason starts than any quartet of teammates in major league history, surpassing the Yankees' Derek Jeter, Tino Martinez, Paul O’Neill, and Bernie Williams, who had started 68 postseason contests together.

==== 2022 ====
An announcement became public on November 3, 2021, that the Astros had selected Gurriel's option for 2022. The club placed him on the paternity list on April 8, 2022 and called up third baseman Joe Perez to take his place on the roster. Gurriel drove in two runs with two hits on April 22 versus the Blue Jays; one hit was a single that started a rally in the ninth versus closer Jordan Romano which fell short as the Astros lost, 4–3. On May 17, Gurriel hit the final of five Astros home runs in the second inning versus starter Nathan Eovaldi of the Boston Red Sox, tying the major league record for home runs hit by a team in one inning as the Astros rolled to a 13–4 victory.

Gurriel collected two hits on May 25 versus the Cleveland Guardians to help key an Astros 2–1 win. Three hits and two runs scored helped lad a 13–3 win over the Chicago White Sox on June 17. On August 11 versus the Texas Rangers, Gurriel broke an 0-for-12 slump with three hits to tie his season high. He connected for his 200th career double in extra innings versus the Atlanta Braves on August 20.

In 2022, Gurriel batted .242/.288/.360 in 584 plate appearances with 8 home runs, 53 RBIs, and a career-high 8 stolen bases. He led the Astros with 40 doubles, ranking sixth in the AL, and was fifth in the league in at-bat-to-strikeout ratio (7.9).

In the ALDS, Gurriel played a critical role in a sweep of the Mariners, batting .400/.400/1.000 with one home run, one stolen base, and no strikeouts over 15 plate appearances. It was his third postseason series with an OPS of at least 1.000, and first since the 2021 ALCS. During Game 5 of the World Series, he exited with a knee injury and was removed from the roster. A resurgent Gurriel batted .347/.360/.490 during the club's postseason. The following day, the Astros defeated the Philadelphia Phillies to give Gurriel his second World Series title. Following the season, Gurriel became a free agent.

The Houston Chronicle ranked Gurriel as the fourth-best first baseman in Astros history through the 2022 season among those who played there more for the club than any other position, following Bagwell, Bob Watson, and Glenn Davis, and ahead of Lee May. Gurriel was an integral piece on squads that reached the ALCS in six consecutive seasons and won two World Series titles. He batted .284 with 94 home runs, 435 RBI and .776 OPS in his first seven seasons in Houston, and hit another 8 home runs in 85 postseason games.

=== Miami Marlins ===
On March 10, 2023, Gurriel signed a one-year minor league contract with the Miami Marlins. On March 26, the Marlins announced that Gurriel had made the Opening Day roster and would have his contract selected to the 40-man roster. On April 25, Gurriel recorded an inside-the-park home run off Atlanta Braves reliever Jesse Chavez after the ball got away from outfielder Kevin Pillar.

The Astros presented Gurriel his 2022 World Series ring during a pregame ceremony at LoanDepot Park on August 16, with former teammates Yordan Alvarez, Jose Altuve, Alex Bregman, Martín Maldonado, Justin Verlander, and manager Dusty Baker. In 108 games for Miami, Gurriel batted .245/.304/.359 with four home runs and 27 RBI. He became a free agent following the season.

=== Atlanta Braves ===
On April 13, 2024, Gurriel signed a minor league contract with the Atlanta Braves. In 75 games for the Triple-A Gwinnett Stripers, he slashed .292/.378/.485 with 12 home runs, 48 RBI, and 11 stolen bases.

=== Kansas City Royals ===
On August 31, 2024, Gurriel was traded to the Kansas City Royals for cash considerations. The next day, Kansas City selected Gurriel's contract, adding him to their active roster. He made his season debut against the Astros on September 1, hitting an RBI single against Tayler Scott. In 18 games for Kansas City, Gurriel hit .241/.338/.296 with no home runs, six RBI, and one stolen base. He batted 4-for-21 in the playoffs.

=== San Diego Padres ===
On February 17, 2025, Gurriel signed a minor league contract with the San Diego Padres. On March 27, the Padres selected Gurriel's contract after he made the team's Opening Day roster. In 16 appearances for San Diego, he batted .111/.200/.139 with no home runs and three RBI. Gurriel was designated for assignment by the Padres on April 29. He cleared waivers and elected free agency on May 3. He was the fifth oldest player in MLB in 2025.

== International career ==
Gurriel represented the Cuba national team before his defection. He helped the national team win a gold medal in the 2004 Summer Olympics, as well as at the World Cup of Baseball championships in 2003 and 2005. During the 2005 World Cup, he led all batters with eight home runs.

Gurriel played second base for the Cuban national team at the 2006 World Baseball Classic (WBC), striking out for the final out for Cuba in their championship game loss to Japan. He batted .273 in the tournament, with a .342 on-base percentage and a .515 slugging percentage. Later in the finals of the 2008 Beijing Olympics tournament, he again made the final out, by grounding into a double play against South Korea.

Gurriel played for Cuba again in the 2009 WBC, as their third baseman. He batted .333 in the tournament with two home runs and six RBIs.

In December 2023, Gurriel was announced as part of FEPCUBE's "Patria y Vida" team of expatriate Cuban ballplayers participating in the inaugural Intercontinental Series in Barranquilla, Colombia. It would have been the first time Gurriel represented Cuba, albeit unofficially, in an international tournament since the 2011 Pan American Games. However, the tournament was cancelled due to diplomatic pressure from the Cuban government.

== Player profile ==
In MLB, Gurriel has had a limited platoon advantage, with a slightly better batting average against right handed pitchers than left-handers but more patient and power against lefties. He is better at batting against breaking balls away from the bat, especially sliders.

== Personal life ==
Gurriel is the older brother of Lourdes Gurriel Jr. who plays for the Arizona Diamondbacks and is the son of Lourdes Gurriel. His family currently resides in Miami, Florida.

== See also ==
- Houston Astros award winners and league leaders
- Houston Astros sign stealing scandal
- List of baseball players who defected from Cuba
- List of baseball players who are Olympic gold medalists and World Series champions
- List of Major League Baseball players from Cuba
- List of Olympic medalists in baseball
- List of second-generation Major League Baseball personnel
- List of Pan American Games medalists in baseball

Awards and achievements
Preceded by DJ LeMahieu	American League Player of the Month; July 2019	Succeeded by Alex Bregman
Preceded by Osmani Urrutia	Cuban National Series MVP; 2004–05	Succeeded by Alexander Mayeta
