= FEPCUBE =

Unrecognized Cuban baseball federation

Cuban Professional Baseball Federation
- Sport: Baseball
- Abbreviation: FEPCUBE
- Founded: August 8, 2023
- Headquarters: Miami
- President: Armando Llanez; Orlando Hernández

Official website
- fepcube.com
- (Cuba)

The Cuban Professional Baseball Federation, commonly known by its Spanish acronym FEPCUBE (Spanish: Federación Profesional Cubana de Beisbol), is a baseball governing body that claims to represent expatriate Cuban baseball players. It is not recognized by the World Baseball Softball Confederation (WBSC) and is opposed by the Cuban government and the Baseball Federation of Cuba (FCB).

== Background ==
Since the Cuban Revolution, the official Baseball Federation of Cuba has largely restricted Cuban players to the amateur domestic league system. Players signing contracts with Major League Baseball were considered defectors and were not seen as eligible to represent Cuba in international competition, like the Baseball World Cup and later, the World Baseball Classic.

One early predecessor of FEPCUBE was the Federation of Professional Cuban Baseball Players in Exile (Federación de Peloteros Profesionales Cubanos en el Exilio). Between 1962 and 2007, the federation held elections in Miami to add new members to the Cuban Baseball Hall of Fame. Tony Pacheco attempted to organize a "Free Cuba" team to participate in the 1965 Amateur World Series, but it did not materialize.

Efforts to organize defected Cuban players began in the run-up to the 2023 World Baseball Classic, when several players expressed their willingness to field a team not organized by the Cuban government. Those efforts ultimately did not come to fruition, and Cuba was represented by the FCB-organized national team.

== History ==
FEPCUBE announced its intention to play in the inaugural Intercontinental Series, to be held in Barranquilla, Colombia in January 2024. The team was expected to include Aroldis Chapman, Yandy Díaz, Lourdes Gurriel Jr., Yennier Canó, and other players who are all ineligible to play organized Cuban baseball. However, that tournament faced pushback from the Colombian government; FEBCUBE dropped its "Patria y Vida" slogan and agreed to play under the "Dream Team" name rather than with Cuban symbols. Nevertheless, the tournament was ultimately canceled, with FEPCUBE alleging it was due to pressure from the Cuban government.

Members of the FEPCUBE team organized for the Intercontinental Series took part in an exhibition game against the Miami Dade College Sharks on January 18, 2024. The game was won by the FEPCUBE team, 3–2.

Cuban baseball legend Yuli Gurriel claimed FEPCUBE "is something unique and historic. Many people, five or 10 years ago, wouldn't have imagined that this could have happened. That makes it unique and important. From the moment I was told about it, I said: I want to be a part of this, and honestly, I don't regret it."

While FEPCUBE is still an official and legal organization, they haven't been able to grow beyond that first exhibition game of 2024 and it feels that players support has been the biggest issue.

José Contreras commented that "When the season started (MLB 2024 season), everything stayed there and we did not receive support from the players who are in the Major Leagues."

== See also ==
- List of baseball players who defected from Cuba
