= 2023 Major League Baseball All-Star Game =

2023 American baseball competition

	1	2	3	4	5	6	7	8	9	R	H	E
National League	0	0	0	1	0	0	0	2	0	3	9	0
American League	0	1	0	0	0	1	0	0	0	2	7	1
- Date: July 11, 2023
- Venue: T-Mobile Park
- City: Seattle, Washington
- Managers: Rob Thomson (PHI); Dusty Baker (HOU)
- MVP: Elías Díaz (COL)
- Attendance: 47,159
- Ceremonial first pitch: Edgar Martínez and Ken Griffey Jr.
- Television: Fox (United States); Fox Deportes; MLB International (International)
- TV announcers: Joe Davis, John Smoltz, Ken Rosenthal and Tom Verducci (Fox); Adrián García Márquez, Edgar González, Carlos Álvarez and Jaime Motta (Fox Deportes); Dave Flemming and Buck Martinez (MLB International)
- Radio: ESPN
- Radio announcers: Jon Sciambi, Doug Glanville, Tim Kurkjian, and Buster Olney

The 2023 Major League Baseball All-Star Game was the 93rd Major League Baseball All-Star Game, held between the American League (AL) and the National League (NL) of Major League Baseball (MLB). The game was played on July 11, 2023, and was broadcast nationally by Fox, Fox Deportes, and ESPN Radio. The game was hosted by the Seattle Mariners at T-Mobile Park in Seattle, Washington. Philadelphia Phillies manager Rob Thomson managed the National League team, while Houston Astros manager Dusty Baker managed the American League team. The NL beat the AL, 3–2, and earned their first win since 2012.

== Background ==
=== Host selection ===
The Seattle Mariners were awarded the game on September 14, 2021. This was the third time that the Mariners hosted an All-Star Game; the previous games were in 1979 at the Kingdome and 2001 at Safeco Field, which was renamed T-Mobile Park before the 2019 season.

To prepare for the All-Star Game and other events, a ride-hailing lot was added to T-Mobile Park in June 2023 and repairs to escalators at International District/Chinatown station were also completed. Sound Transit, the regional transit operator, increased the frequency of Link light rail trains on the 1 Line and ran special event Sounder commuter trains for the Home Run Derby and All-Star Game. Service on the West Seattle Water Taxi was extended on event days. Fares on Sound Transit, King County Metro, and Kitsap Transit services, including buses and ferries, were also waived on July 10 and 11.

=== Roster selections ===
The starting rosters for each league's position players plus designated hitter (DH) were determined by fan balloting, which was conducted in two phases. Since 2022, the first-phase top vote-getter for each league automatically received a spot in the starting lineup. The top two vote-getters for every other non-pitching position and DH advanced to the second phase of voting. There are normally six finalists for the three outfield positions in each league, except when an outfielder is the top vote-getter, in which case there are four finalists for the remaining two outfield positions. Voting does not carry over between phases.

First phase voting was held from May 1 through June 22, and second phase voting was held from June 26 through June 29. All voting was conducted online, at MLB.com or via the MLB app. Starting players, as selected via voting, were announced on June 29. Reserve position players and all pitchers—selected "via 'Player Ballot' choices and selections made by the Commissioner’s Office"—were announced on July 2.

The leading vote getter in each league during phase one was Shohei Ohtani of the Los Angeles Angels and Ronald Acuña Jr. of the Atlanta Braves. Acuña received the most votes during phase one.

=== Logo and uniforms ===
The 2023 All-Star Game logo featured imagery that symbolized the Pacific Northwest, incorporating silhouettes of Mount Rainier, the Space Needle, and evergreen trees. The yellow compass between the words "ALL" and "STAR" pointed to the northwest as an allusion to Seattle's location, and the five corners were a nod to the five-state region of the Pacific Northwest. The branding is based on the Mariners' current colors of navy blue, northwest green, and silver. The uniforms for the game featured Nike's new Vapor Premier template which will be rolled out in every Major League uniform beginning in 2024. The American League wore predominantly northwest green tops with white pants, while the National League wore predominantly navy blue tops and pants; both uniforms sported "AMERICAN" and "NATIONAL" instead of each player's team wordmarks. Caps provided by the New Era Cap Company were mint with the team logos in navy blue and white, and the All-Star logo on the right side.

== Rosters ==
=== National League ===
Elected starters
Position	Player	Team	All-Star Games
C	Sean Murphy	Braves	1
1B	Freddie Freeman	Dodgers	7
2B	Luis Arráez	Marlins	2
3B	Nolan Arenado	Cardinals	8
SS	Orlando Arcia	Braves	1
OF	Ronald Acuña Jr.†	Braves	4
OF	Mookie Betts	Dodgers	7
OF	Corbin Carroll	Diamondbacks	1
DH	J. D. Martinez	Dodgers	6

Reserves
Position	Player	Team	All-Star Games
C	Elías Díaz	Rockies	1
C	Will Smith	Dodgers	1
1B	Pete Alonso	Mets	3
1B	Matt Olson	Braves	2
2B	Ozzie Albies	Braves	3
3B	Austin Riley	Braves	2
SS	Geraldo Perdomo^{[H]}	Diamondbacks	1
SS	Dansby Swanson^{#}	Cubs	2
OF	Nick Castellanos	Phillies	2
OF	Lourdes Gurriel Jr.	Diamondbacks	1
OF	Juan Soto	Padres	3
DH	Jorge Soler	Marlins	1

Pitchers
Player	Team	All-Star Games
David Bednar^{[A]}	Pirates	2
Corbin Burnes^{[M]}	Brewers	3
Alex Cobb^{[L]}	Giants	1
Alexis Díaz	Reds	1
Camilo Doval	Giants	1
Bryce Elder^{#}	Braves	1
Zac Gallen	Diamondbacks	1
Josiah Gray	Nationals	1
Josh Hader	Padres	5
Mitch Keller	Pirates	1
Clayton Kershaw^{#}	Dodgers	10
Craig Kimbrel^{[K]}	Phillies	9
Kodai Senga^{[J]}	Mets	1
Justin Steele	Cubs	1
Spencer Strider^{#}	Braves	1
Marcus Stroman^{#}	Cubs	2
Devin Williams^{#}	Brewers	2

=== American League ===
Elected starters
Position	Player	Team	All-Star Games
C	Jonah Heim	Rangers	1
1B	Yandy Díaz	Rays	1
2B	Marcus Semien	Rangers	2
3B	Josh Jung	Rangers	1
SS	Corey Seager	Rangers	4
OF	Randy Arozarena	Rays	1
OF	Aaron Judge^{#}	Yankees	5
OF	Mike Trout^{#}	Angels	11
DH	Shohei Ohtani†	Angels	3

Reserves
Position	Player	Team	All-Star Games
C	Salvador Pérez	Royals	8
C	Adley Rutschman	Orioles	1
1B	Vladimir Guerrero Jr.	Blue Jays	3
2B	Whit Merrifield	Blue Jays	3
3B	José Ramírez	Guardians	5
SS	Bo Bichette	Blue Jays	2
SS	Wander Franco^{[B]}	Rays	1
OF	Yordan Alvarez^{#}	Astros	2
OF	Adolis García^{[G]}	Rangers	2
OF	Austin Hays^{[F]}	Orioles	1
OF	Luis Robert Jr.	White Sox	1
OF	Julio Rodríguez^{[D]}	Mariners	2
OF	Kyle Tucker^{[C]}	Astros	2
DH	Brent Rooker	Athletics	1

Pitchers
Player	Team	All-Star Games
Félix Bautista	Orioles	1
Yennier Canó	Orioles	1
Luis Castillo	Mariners	3
Emmanuel Clase^{#}	Guardians	2
Gerrit Cole	Yankees	6
Nathan Eovaldi	Rangers	2
Carlos Estévez^{[I]}	Angels	1
Sonny Gray	Twins	3
Kevin Gausman^{#}	Blue Jays	2
Kenley Jansen	Red Sox	4
George Kirby^{[E]}	Mariners	1
Pablo López^{[N]}	Twins	1
Michael Lorenzen	Tigers	1
Shane McClanahan^{#}	Rays	2
Shohei Ohtani	Angels	3
Jordan Romano^{[O]}	Blue Jays	2
Framber Valdez^{#}	Astros	2

† Denotes top vote-getter in each league

==== Roster notes ====
1. David Bednar was named as the roster replacement for Clayton Kershaw due to injury.
2. Wander Franco was named as the roster replacement for Aaron Judge due to injury.
3. Kyle Tucker was named as the roster replacement for Mike Trout due to injury.
4. Julio Rodríguez was named as the roster replacement for Yordan Alvarez due to injury.
5. George Kirby was named as the roster replacement for Shane McClanahan due to injury.
6. Austin Hays was named starter in place of Mike Trout due to injury.
7. Adolis García was named starter in place of Aaron Judge due to injury.
8. Geraldo Perdomo was named as the roster replacement for Dansby Swanson due to injury.
9. Carlos Estévez was named as the roster replacement for Emmanuel Clase due to Clase opting not to play.
10. Kodai Senga was named as the roster replacement for Marcus Stroman due to Stroman opting not to play.
11. Craig Kimbrel was named as the roster replacement for Devin Williams due to Williams opting not to play.
12. Alex Cobb was named as the roster replacement for Bryce Elder due to Elder starting on Sunday.
13. Corbin Burnes was named as the roster replacement for Spencer Strider due to Strider starting on Saturday.
14. Pablo López was named as the roster replacement for Kevin Gausman due to Gausman starting on Saturday.
15. Jordan Romano was named as the roster replacement for Framber Valdez due to Valdez starting on Saturday.

#: Indicates player would not play (replaced as per reference notes above).

== Game summary ==
=== Starting lineup ===
National League
Order	Player	Team	Position
1	Ronald Acuña Jr.	Braves	RF
2	Freddie Freeman	Dodgers	1B
3	Mookie Betts	Dodgers	CF
4	J.D. Martinez	Dodgers	DH
5	Nolan Arenado	Cardinals	3B
6	Luis Arráez	Marlins	2B
7	Sean Murphy	Braves	C
8	Corbin Carroll	Diamondbacks	LF
9	Orlando Arcia	Braves	SS
	Zac Gallen	Diamondbacks	P

American League
Order	Player	Team	Position
1	Marcus Semien	Rangers	2B
2	Shohei Ohtani	Angels	DH
3	Randy Arozarena	Rays	LF
4	Corey Seager	Rangers	SS
5	Yandy Díaz	Rays	1B
6	Adolis García	Rangers	RF
7	Austin Hays	Orioles	CF
8	Josh Jung	Rangers	3B
9	Jonah Heim	Rangers	C
	Gerrit Cole	Yankees	P

=== Line score ===
July 11, 2023 5:20 pm (PDT) T-Mobile Park in Seattle, Washington
Team	1	2	3	4	5	6	7	8	9	R	H	E
National League	0	0	0	1	0	0	0	2	0	3	9	0
American League	0	1	0	0	0	1	0	0	0	2	7	1
Starting pitchers: NL: Zac Gallen; AL: Gerrit Cole; WP: Camilo Doval (1–0) LP: Félix Bautista (0–1) Sv: Craig Kimbrel (1); Home runs: NL: Elías Díaz (1); AL: Yandy Díaz (1); Attendance: 47,159 Time: 3:03; Umpires: HP – Todd Tichenor; 1B – Quinn Wolcott; 2B – Tripp Gibson; 3B – Stu Scheurwater; LF – Ryan Blakney; RF – Ramon De Jesus; Replay Official – Jim Wolf; Boxscore

The Canadian national anthem was sung by country singer Tenille Townes. The American national anthem was performed by R&B singer Kiana Ledé. Ken Griffey Jr. and Edgar Martínez threw ceremonial first pitches.

In the bottom of the second inning, Yandy Díaz hit a solo home run to lead off the American League team at 1–0. In the top of the fourth inning, Luis Arráez hit an RBI single to score J. D. Martinez to tie the National League team at one. In the bottom of the sixth inning, Salvador Pérez scored on a sacrifice fly by Bo Bichette to put the AL team in the lead at 2–1. In the top of the seventh inning, Lourdes Gurriel Jr. hit a foul ball off Jordan Romano that was initially ruled a game-tying home run. The call was overturned upon review, but three pitches later, Gurriel singled off Michael Lorenzen after Romano exited with lower back tightness. Following a Geraldo Perdomo walk, Juan Soto popped out to third baseman José Ramírez, leaving the score 2–1 in the American League's favor. Elías Díaz hit a two-run home run in the top of the eighth inning to give the National League a 3–2 lead. After walking Kyle Tucker and Julio Rodríguez, Craig Kimbrel struck out José Ramírez to end the game. The National League won the All-Star Game for the first time since 2012.

== See also ==
- All-Star Futures Game
- 2023 Major League Baseball Home Run Derby
- List of Major League Baseball All-Star Games
- Major League Baseball All-Star Game Most Valuable Player Award
