= Elías Díaz =

Venezuelan baseball player (born 1990)

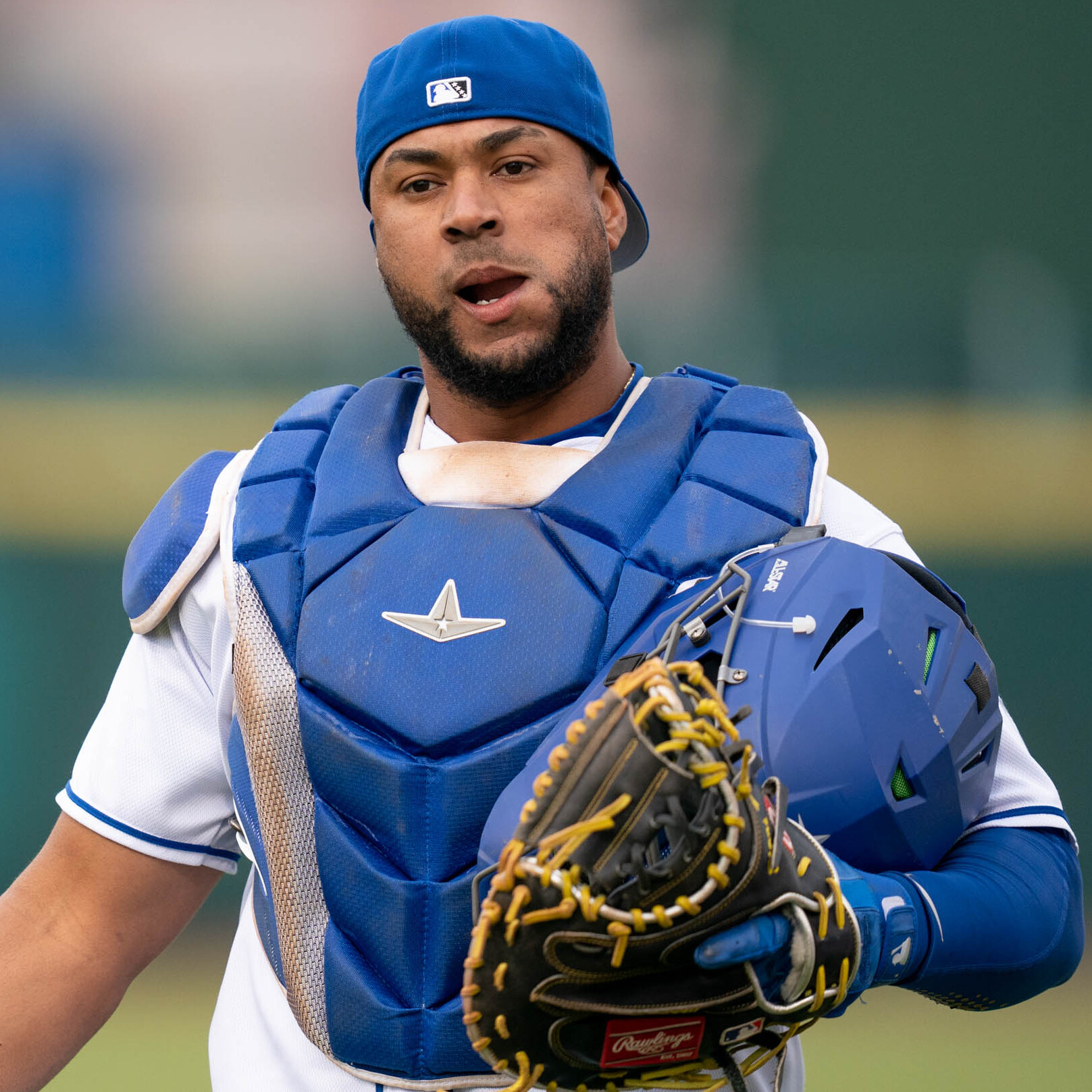
- Díaz with the Omaha Storm Chasers in 2026

Free agent
- Catcher
- Born: November 17, 1990 (age 35); Maracaibo, Venezuela
- Bats: Right Throws: Right

MLB debut
- September 12, 2015, for the Pittsburgh Pirates

MLB statistics (through 2026 season)
- Batting average: .246
- Home runs: 79
- Runs batted in: 361
- Stats at Baseball Reference

Teams
- Pittsburgh Pirates (2015–2019); Colorado Rockies (2020–2024); San Diego Padres (2024–2025); Kansas City Royals (2026); Texas Rangers (2026)

Career highlights and awards
- All-Star (2023)

Elías David Díaz Soto (born November 17, 1990) is a Venezuelan professional baseball catcher who is a free agent. He has played in Major League Baseball (MLB) for the Pittsburgh Pirates, Colorado Rockies, San Diego Padres, Kansas City Royals, and Texas Rangers. Díaz has also represented the Colombia national team.

== Professional career ==
=== Pittsburgh Pirates ===
==== Minor leagues ====
Díaz signed with the Pittsburgh Pirates as an international free agent in 2008. He made his professional debut in 2009 for the Venezuelan Summer League Pirates. From 2010 to 2013, he played for the Gulf Coast Pirates (batting .210), West Virginia Power (batting .221, and then .208 the following year) and Bradenton Marauders (batting .279).

Díaz started 2014 with the Double-A Altoona Curve. In August he was promoted to the Triple-A Indianapolis Indians after hitting .328 with Altoona, but he then batted .152/.243/.182 in Triple-A. On November 20, 2014, Díaz was added to the Pirates' 40-man roster to protect him from the Rule 5 draft.

Díaz spent most of the 2015 and 2016 seasons in Triple-A. In 2015, he was an International League All-Star and was named to the All-Star Futures Game. He also was named the best minor league catcher by Baseball America. His 2016 season was limited by injury, as he had surgery to remove bone chips from his right elbow in early May, then suffered an infection in his left leg in early September.

==== Major leagues ====
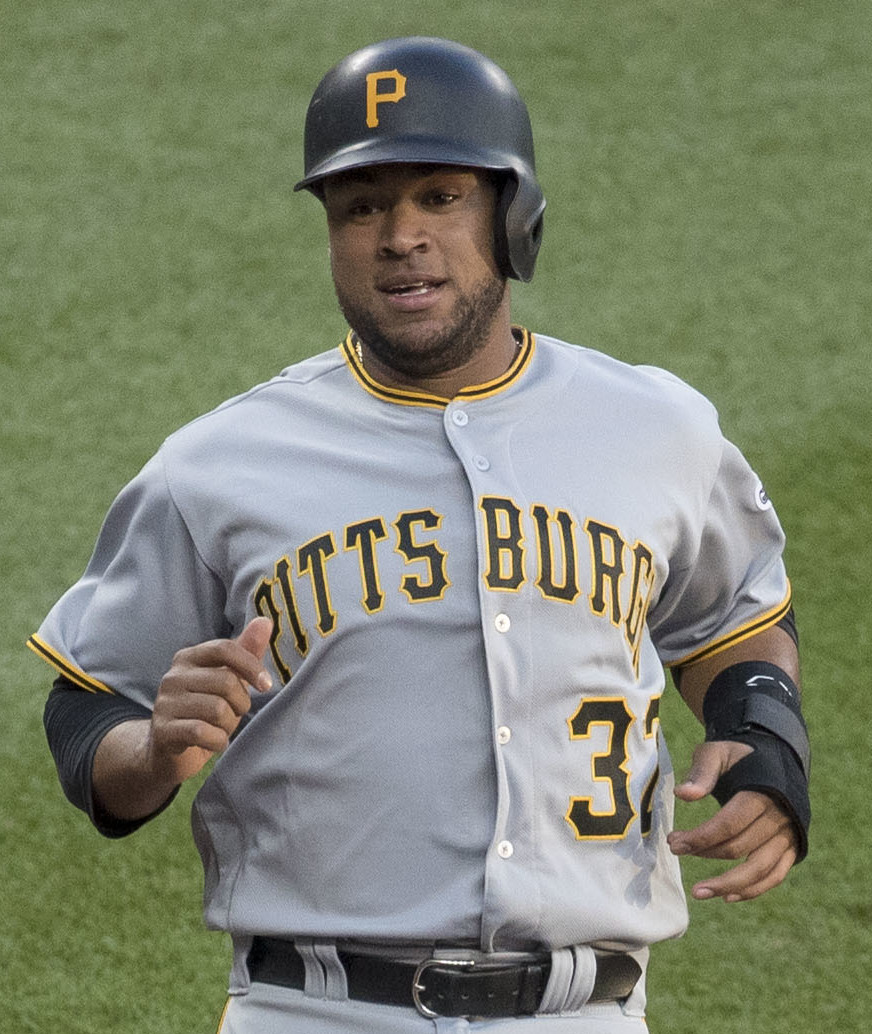
Díaz with the Pittsburgh Pirates in 2017

Díaz made his major league debut on September 12, 2015, as a pinch hitter. He went 0-for-2 as a Pirates pinch hitter in 2015, never playing defensively. He played in one game for the Pirates in 2016, going 0-for-4 on July 24. He did get his first career MLB RBI and picked off runner Carlos Ruiz at second base. He was the Pirates' primary backup to Francisco Cervelli in 2017, batting .223/.265/.314 with one home run in 200 plate appearances. He again backed up Cervelli in 2018, improving his offensive production to a .283/.339/.452 slash line with 10 home runs in 277 plate appearances.

Díaz was the Pirates' primary catcher in 2019, but his offense cratered, batting .241/.296/.307 with 2 home runs in 332 plate appearances. On December 2, 2019, Díaz was non-tendered by Pittsburgh and became a free agent.

=== Colorado Rockies ===
On January 6, 2020, Díaz signed a minor league contract with the Colorado Rockies. Díaz made the Opening Day roster for the pandemic-shortened 2020 season. Díaz batted .235/.288/.353 with two home runs in 73 plate appearances over 2020. In 2021, he batted .246/.310/.464 with 18 home runs and 44 RBI in 106 games. On November 18, 2021, Díaz signed a three-year, $14.5 million extension with the Rockies. On September 10, 2022, Diaz went 4-for-5 with two home runs and seven RBI, including a three-run walk-off home run, leading the Rockies to a 13-10 win.

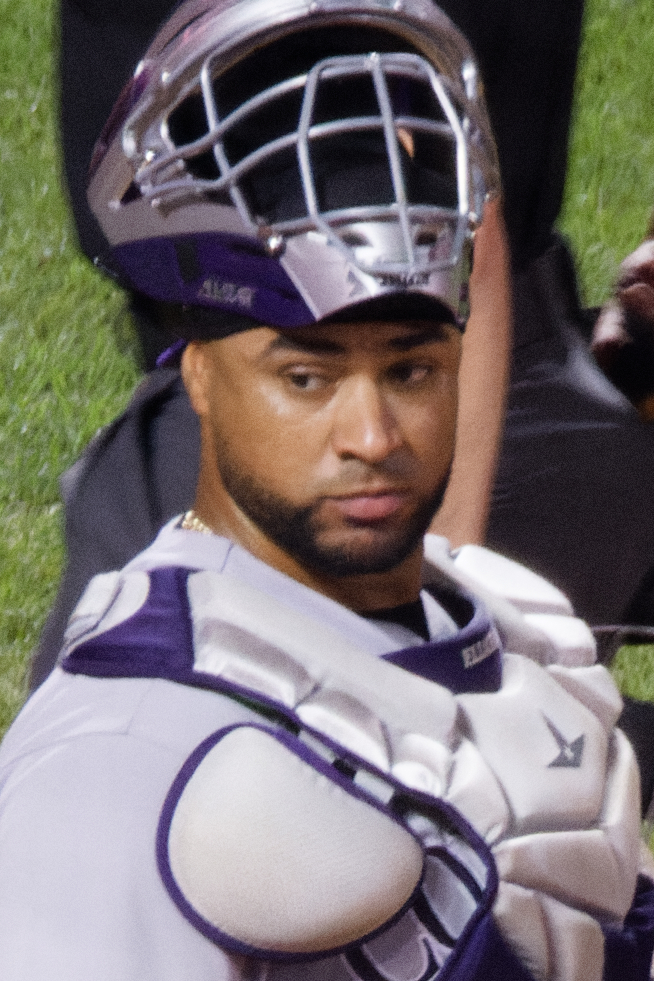
Díaz with the Rockies in 2022

In 2023, Díaz was named to the 2023 Major League Baseball All-Star Game. He hit the game-winning home run for the National League in the eighth inning and was named the game's Most Valuable Player. In 141 games for Colorado in 2023, he slashed .267/.316/.409 with 14 home runs and a career-high 72 RBI.

Díaz played in 84 games for the Rockies in 2024, hitting .270/.315/.378 with five home runs and 36 RBI. He was released by Colorado on August 16, as the team promoted catcher Drew Romo .

=== San Diego Padres ===
On August 26, 2024, Díaz signed a minor league contract with the San Diego Padres. In 4 games for the Triple-A El Paso Chihuahuas, he went 3–for–12 (.250) with one home run and six RBI. On September 1, the Padres selected Díaz's contract, adding him to their active roster. In 12 games for San Diego in 2024, Díaz batted .190/.292/.429 with one home run and three RBI. He made his postseason debut in Game 2 of the National League Division Series, striking out in his only at bat. He became a free agent after the season.

On January 28, 2025, Díaz re-signed with the Padres on a one-year, $3.5 million contract. He made 106 appearances for San Diego during the regular season, slashing .204/.270/.337 with nine home runs and 29 RBI. The Padres declined Díaz's option year on November 4, making him a free agent.

=== Kansas City Royals ===
On February 20, 2026, Díaz signed a minor league contract with the Kansas City Royals. He began the regular season with the Triple-A Omaha Storm Chasers, batting .219 across 10 contests. On April 19, the Royals selected Díaz's contract, adding him to their active roster. He made 10 appearances for Kansas City, going 5-for-22 (.227) with two home runs and five RBI. On May 22, Díaz was designated for assignment by the Royals. He cleared waivers and was sent outright to Omaha on May 26. However, Díaz elected free agency in lieu of the assignment on June 3.

=== Texas Rangers ===
On June 6, 2026, Díaz signed a major league contract with the Texas Rangers.

== International career ==
Born in Venezuela, Díaz's father was from Colombia, making him eligible to represent the Colombia national baseball team. He was slated to play with Colombia at the 2017 World Baseball Classic, but was not permitted by the Pirates organization due to injury reasons. He was named to the Colombian roster for the 2023 World Baseball Classic, where he shared catching duties with Meibrys Viloria. Díaz hit .250/.250/.375 in eight at-bats in the tournament. He hit an RBI double in the team's 10-inning win over Mexico.

== Personal life ==
Díaz is married to Katherine Delgado and has two children, Eliana and Elanie.

Díaz's parents are Ana Soto and Porfirio Díaz. His father died when he was six years old. His mother was kidnapped in Venezuela in 2022, one of several such incidents involving ballplayers' family members in Venezuela. His older brother Emison Soto played in the Boston Red Sox minor league system from 1990 to 1994 and continued to play in Mexican and American independent baseball until 2004.

== See also ==
- List of Major League Baseball players from Venezuela
