= Austin Hays =

American baseball player (born 1995)

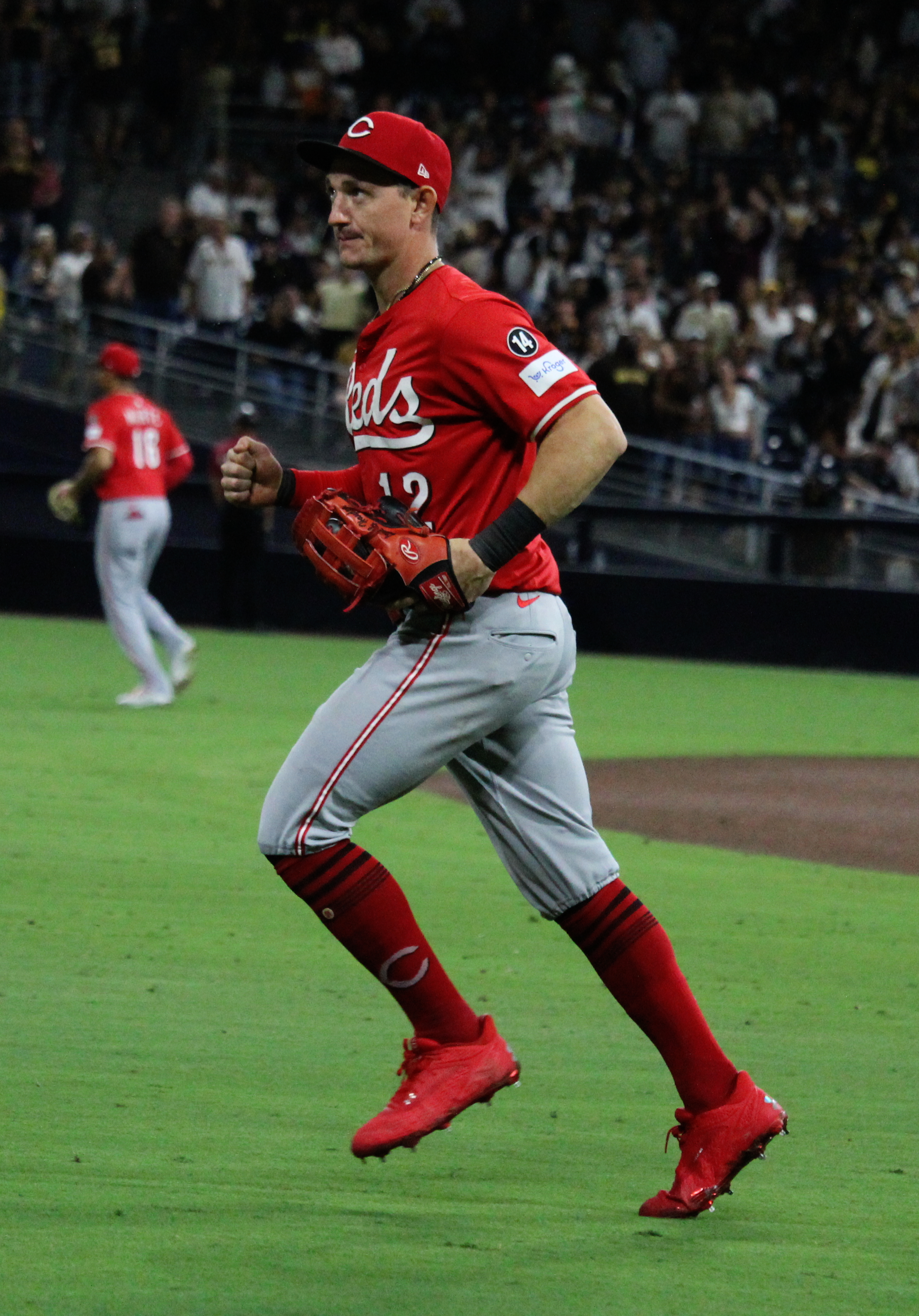
- Hays with the Cincinnati Reds in 2025

Free agent
- Outfielder
- Born: July 5, 1995 (age 31); Daytona Beach, Florida, U.S.
- Bats: Right Throws: Right

MLB debut
- September 7, 2017, for the Baltimore Orioles

MLB statistics (through 2026 season)
- Batting average: .263
- Home runs: 86
- Runs batted in: 327
- Stats at Baseball Reference

Teams
- Baltimore Orioles (2017, 2019–2024); Philadelphia Phillies (2024); Cincinnati Reds (2025); Chicago White Sox (2026); San Diego Padres (2026)

Career highlights and awards
- All-Star (2023)

Austin Charles Bryan Hays (born July 5, 1995) is an American professional baseball outfielder who is a free agent. He has played in Major League Baseball (MLB) for the Baltimore Orioles, Philadelphia Phillies, Cincinnati Reds, Chicago White Sox, and San Diego Padres. Hays made his MLB debut in 2017 with the Orioles. He was an All-Star in 2023.

== Amateur career ==
Hays was born July 5, 1995, in Daytona Beach, Florida, to parents Terrie and Chuck. As an outfielder for Spruce Creek High School in Port Orange, Florida, Hays developed his arm strength to assist on defensive plays. In 2012, Hays batted .402, including .426 with runners in scoring position, and had 26 runs batted in (RBIs) en route to winning a state championship title with Spruce Creek.

Hays attended Seminole State College of Florida, where he played college baseball for the Seminole State Raiders, and transferred to Jacksonville University, where he continued his college baseball career with the Jacksonville Dolphins. In 2015, he played collegiate summer baseball with the Hyannis Harbor Hawks of the Cape Cod Baseball League.

== Professional career ==
=== Baltimore Orioles ===
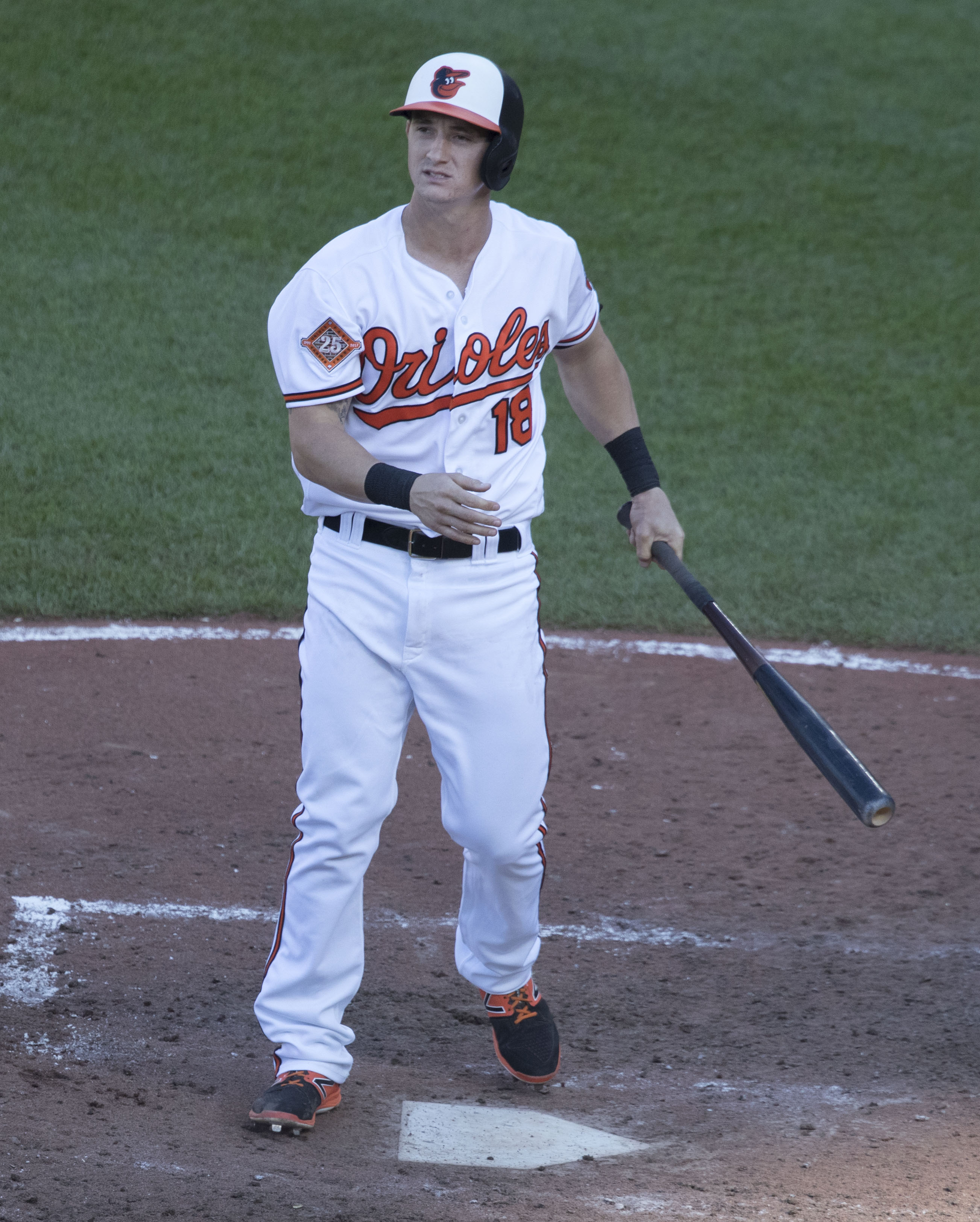
Hays in 2017

The Baltimore Orioles selected Hays in the third round of the 2016 Major League Baseball draft. Hays signed and made his professional debut with the Aberdeen Ironbirds of the Low-A New York-Penn League where he batted .336 with four home runs and 21 RBI in 38 games. He started the 2017 season with the Frederick Keys of the High-A Carolina League. On May 26, 2017, he became the first player in Frederick history to hit three home runs in one game. He received a promotion to the Bowie Baysox of the Double-A Eastern League in June 2017. In 128 games between Frederick and Bowie, he slashed .329/.365/.593 with 32 home runs and 95 RBI.

The Orioles promoted Hays to the major leagues on September 5, 2017, making him the first 2016 draftee to reach the major leagues. He made his major league debut September 7, 2017. He had his first MLB hit, followed by his first MLB home run, in a 9–3 loss against the New York Yankees on September 16. In 20 games for Baltimore during the 2017 season, he batted .217/.238/.317 in 60 at bats. He began 2018 with Bowie. He did not play in the majors in 2018, struggling with underperformance and injury.

Hays was recalled by the Orioles from the Triple-A Norfolk Tides on September 7, 2019. He was supposed to have reported to the Surprise Saguaros on September 11, the first time ever that the Arizona Fall League (AFL) season opened before October. His promotion was made possible by both MLB and the Major League Baseball Players Association (MLBPA) which, two days prior to the transaction, approved a rule change that allowed players on the 40-man roster to report to the AFL in October. In a 15-inning 11–10 loss to the Toronto Blue Jays at Rogers Centre on September 23, he became the first MLB rookie to have at least five RBIs, a stolen base and an outfield assist in the same game since the RBI became an official stat in 1920. The Orioles eventually decided not to send him to the Saguaros after he started in 15 of 20 games, batted .313 with a .958 OPS and made several spectacular defensive plays. On August 11, 2020, Hays hit a two-run inside-the-park home run against the Philadelphia Phillies to break an 8-8 tie. That would be the game's difference maker as the Orioles won the game in extra innings, 10-9.

In 2020 for the Orioles, Hays slashed .279/.328/.393 with four home runs and nine RBI; in 2021, he appeared in 131 games with Baltimore, batting .256 with 22 home runs and 71 RBI.

On June 22, 2022, Hays hit for the cycle in a game against the Washington Nationals. In August, Hays was named the Orioles' Heart & Hustle Award winner for the 2022 season. Playing in 145 games for Baltimore, he batted .250/.306/.413 with 16 home runs and 60 RBI. On January 13, 2023, Hays agreed to a one-year, $3.2 million contract with the Orioles, avoiding salary arbitration. He got five hits in a 9–8 away loss to the Boston Red Sox in the second game of the season on April 1. He had his first four-hit game of the campaign ten nights later in a 12–8 home win over the Oakland Athletics on April 11.

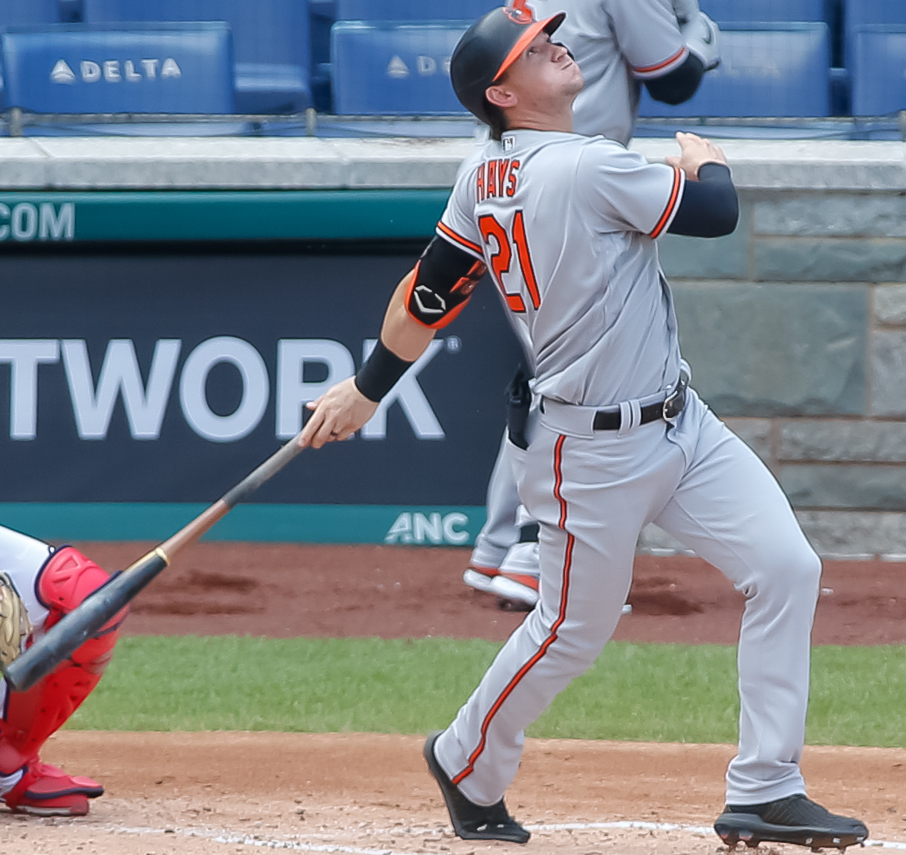
Hays batting in 2020

Hays was named to the All-Star Game in 2023 after a stellar first half that saw him hit .314/.355/.498 with 9 home runs and 36 RBI in 78 games. He was named the starting center fielder for the game, replacing Mike Trout, who withdrew due to injury. He added two more four-hit games in a pair of road victories after the All-Star break, the first was 6–1 over the Toronto Blue Jays on August 3 followed one month later by 10–3 over the Los Angeles Angels on September 6 in which he also had a season-high four RBI.

Hays was sidelined from April 22 to May 13, 2024, because of a strained left calf. Hays appeared in 63 games for the Orioles in 2024, hitting .255/.316/.395 with three home runs and 14 RBI.

=== Philadelphia Phillies ===
On July 26, 2024, Hays was traded to the Philadelphia Phillies in exchange for Seranthony Domínguez and Cristian Pache. In 22 games for the Phillies, he slashed .256/.275/.397 with two home runs, six RBI, and two stolen bases. During his time with the Phillies, a kidney infection hampered his ability to play. On November 22, Hays was non–tendered by the Phillies and became a free agent.

=== Cincinnati Reds ===
On January 30, 2025, Hays signed a one-year, $5 million contract with the Cincinnati Reds. In 103 appearances for Cincinnati, he batted .266/.315/.453 with 15 home runs, 64 RBI, and seven stolen bases. On November 5, the Reds declined Hays' 2026 option, making him a free agent.

=== Chicago White Sox ===
On February 4, 2026, Hays signed a one-year, $6 million contract with the Chicago White Sox. In 12 appearances for the team, he batted .233/.250/.326 with one home run and seven RBI. On April 7, Hays was placed on the injured list due to a right hamstring strain. He was transferred to the 60-day injured list on June 9. On August 5, Hays was designated for assignment by the White Sox. He was released by the team two days later.

=== San Diego Padres ===
On August 9, 2026, Hays signed a one-year contract with the San Diego Padres. He made his Padres debut the following night as a pinch-hitter in the eighth inning against the Houston Astros, hitting a home run off Bryan King.

== Personal life ==
Hays and his wife Samantha have two sons together. The couple met when they were in high school together at Spruce Creek.

Hays is a Christian. He became a Christian, along with his wife, in 2020.

Achievements
Preceded by Jared Walsh	Hitting for the cycle June 22, 2022	Succeeded by Nolan Arenado
