= Luis Robert Jr. =

Cuban-born baseball player (born 1997)

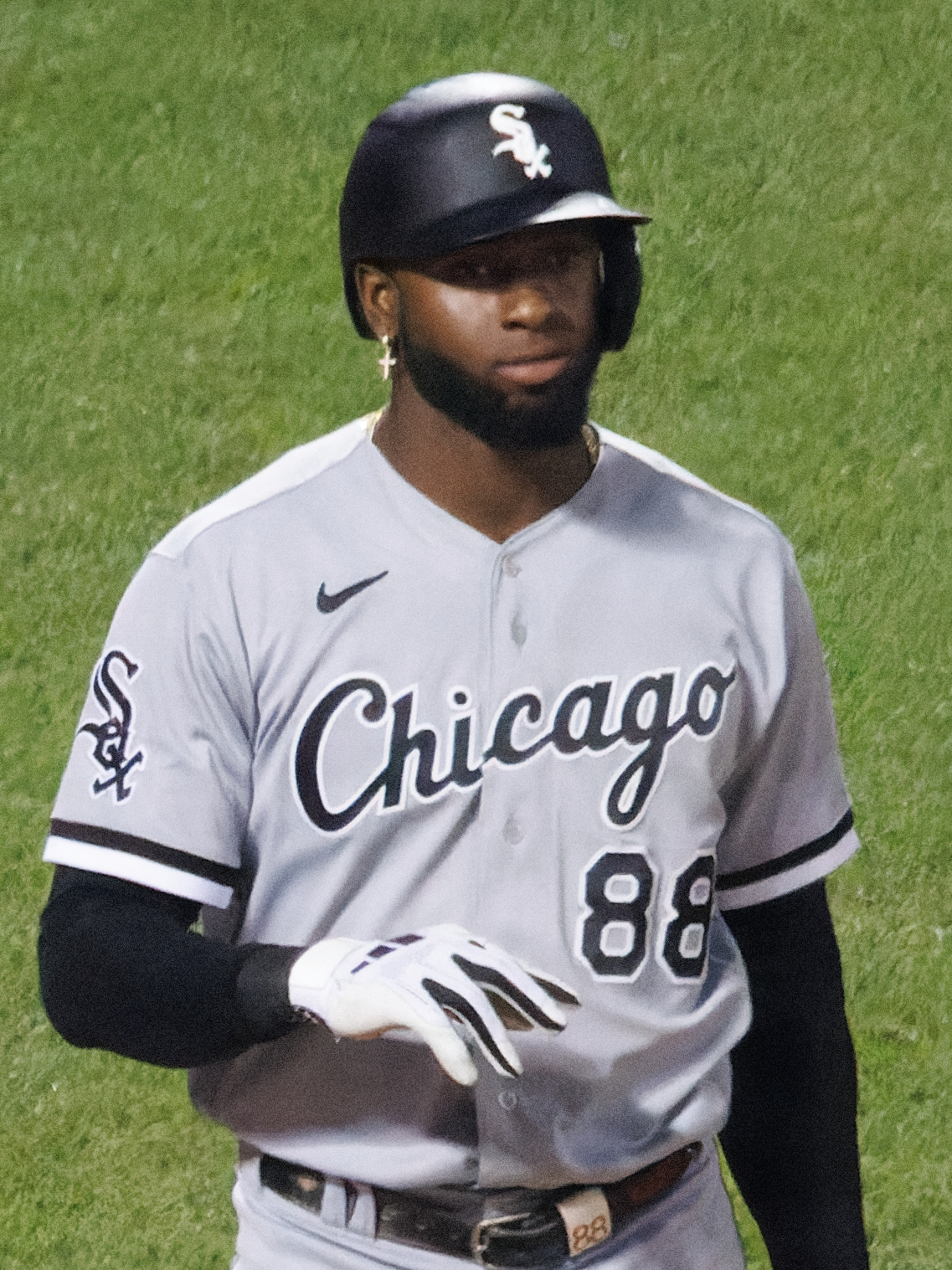
- Robert with the White Sox in 2023

Free agent
- Center fielder
- Born: August 3, 1997 (age 29); Ciego de Ávila, Cuba
- Bats: Right Throws: Right

MLB debut
- July 24, 2020, for the Chicago White Sox

MLB statistics (through 2026 season)
- Batting average: .256
- Home runs: 113
- Runs batted in: 324
- Stolen bases: 104
- Stats at Baseball Reference

Teams
- Chicago White Sox (2020–2025); New York Mets (2026); Baltimore Orioles (2026)

Career highlights and awards
- All-Star (2023); Gold Glove Award (2020); Silver Slugger Award (2023)
Medals
Men's baseball
Representing Cuba
15U Baseball World Championship
Silver medal – second place	2012 Chihuahua	Team
18U Baseball World Cup
Bronze medal – third place	2013 Taichung	Team

Luis Robert Moirán Jr. (born August 3, 1997) is a Cuban-born professional baseball center fielder who is a free agent. He has played in Major League Baseball (MLB) for the Chicago White Sox, New York Mets, and Baltimore Orioles. After defecting from Cuba in 2016, Robert signed with the White Sox in 2017. He made his MLB debut in 2020. That year, he won the Gold Glove Award. He was named an All-Star in 2023.

== Professional career ==
=== Cuban National Series ===
Robert played in the Cuban National Series for Ciego de Ávila from 2013 to 2015.

=== Chicago White Sox ===
==== Minor leagues ====
In November 2016, Robert defected from Cuba to pursue a Major League Baseball (MLB) career in the United States. On April 20, 2017, he was declared a free agent, but he was not eligible to sign with any major league club until May 20.

On May 27, 2017, Robert signed a contract with the Chicago White Sox that included a $26 million signing bonus. After signing, he reported to the Dominican Summer League White Sox and played 28 games there, posting a .310 batting average with three home runs, 14 runs batted in (RBI), 22 walks, and 12 stolen bases.

In 2018, Robert made his first start in the outfield in a spring training game and hit a two-out, go-ahead grand slam in the eighth inning, lifting the White Sox to a 14–12 victory over the Cincinnati Reds. However, Robert was placed on the injured list for two months after the game, because he had sprained a ligament in his left thumb while sliding into second base.

Robert began 2019 with the Winston-Salem Dash; he was promoted to the Birmingham Barons on April 30. Robert was named to the 2019 All-Star Futures Game. On July 11, he made his debut with the Triple–A Charlotte Knights, where he hit two home runs in his first game with seven RBI. Robert joined the 30/30 club by hitting 30 home runs and stealing 36 bases during the 2019 season.

In 2019, he scored 108 runs, the second most in the minor leagues, and he led the minors with 165 hits.

==== Rookie season and Gold Glove Award (2020) ====
On January 2, 2020, Robert agreed to a six-year, $50 million contract with the Chicago White Sox before appearing in a major league game. The contract included team options for 2026 and 2027 which, if exercised, could bring the value of the contract to $88 million. On July 24, he made his MLB debut. He hit his first MLB home run on July 26.

In August 2020, Robert batted .298/.356/.660, including seven doubles, nine home runs, 20 RBIs, and three stolen bases over 26 games. He won the American League (AL) Rookie of the Month Award, his first monthly award in the major leagues. Overall in 2020, he batted .233/.302/.436 over 202 at-bats. Robert hit his first postseason home run in Game 3 of the Wild Card Series against the Oakland Athletics off of Mike Fiers. His 487-foot home run was the longest postseason home run in White Sox history. He also won the Gold Glove Award for center field, becoming the second White Sox player in history to win the award in his rookie season. Robert also finished second in balloting for the AL Rookie of the Year Award, losing to Kyle Lewis of the Seattle Mariners.

==== 2021 ====
Robert slashed .316/.359/.461 in 25 games through May 2, when he suffered a complete tear of his right hip flexor. The injury required a rehabilitation period of three to four months before he could resume baseball activities. On May 27, he was placed on the 60-day injured list. He was activated off the injured list on August 9. Overall, Robert hit .338 with 13 home runs and 43 RBIs in 68 games in 2021.

==== 2022 ====
On July 14, 2022, in a game against the Minnesota Twins at Target Field, Robert hit his first career grand slam off of starting pitcher Sonny Gray. On September 24, Robert was placed on the IL with a sprained left wrist which ended his season after getting hit by a pitch against the Seattle Mariners. In 2022, Robert appeared in 98 games, batting .284/.319/.426 with 12 home runs and 56 RBIs.

==== 2023 ====
On February 17, 2023, Robert announced that he would utilize the "Jr." suffix in his name from then on, which would also be reflected on his uniform. During a game against the Tampa Bay Rays on April 29, Robert was benched after not hustling to first base after hitting a ground ball to the third-base side of the mound. Robert stated after the game that the lack of hustle was due his legs being tired and having a tight right hamstring. Robert also said that he did not tell anybody about his alleged pain, including the manager, so that he would be able to play in the game. Robert won the American League Player of the Week Award on June 26 after he batted .444 with a 1.111 slugging percentage in the previous six games. Robert was named to his first All-Star Game. Robert also announced he was going to be participating in the 2023 Major League Baseball Home Run Derby. Robert advanced to the semi-finals where he eventually lost to Randy Arozarena. Robert announced he wouldn't be participating in the All-Star Game due to tightness in his right calf he suffered from the Home Run Derby. Overall, in his All-Star season, Robert finished with a slash line of .264/.315/.542 in 145 games with 38 home runs, 80 RBIs, and 20 stolen bases, earning him a Silver Slugger Award and finishing 12th in MVP voting.

==== 2024 ====
On April 5, 2024, in a game against the Kansas City Royals, Robert suffered a Grade 2 flexor strain in his right hip while rounding first base in the ninth inning. He was then placed on the 10-day injured list the next day and had to miss about two months. The White Sox activated Robert from the IL on June 4 and made his return the same day against the Chicago Cubs at Wrigley Field. In his return, he went 2-for-4 with a 448-foot home run to left field off of pitcher Hayden Wesneski. In 100 games for the White Sox in 2024, Robert batted .224/.278/.379 with 14 home runs, 23 stolen bases, and 35 RBI.

==== 2025 ====
On May 2, 2025, Robert hit a solo home run to right-center field for the 500th hit of his career, putting the White Sox up 3-1 over the Houston Astros. He made 110 appearances for the White Sox, batting .223/.297/.364 with 14 home runs, 53 RBI, and 33 stolen bases. On August 27, Robert was placed on the injured list due to a Grade 2 hamstring strain.

=== New York Mets ===
On January 20, 2026, the White Sox traded Robert to the New York Mets in exchange for Luisangel Acuña and Truman Pauley. On March 28, in his second game for the Mets, Robert hit a walk-off home run in the 11th inning of a game against the Pittsburgh Pirates. On April 30, Robert was placed on the injured list due to a lumbar disc herniation. He was transferred to the 60-day injured list on May 26. Robert was activated from the injured list on July 20. Robert was placed on waivers by the Mets on August 29. Across 58 games with the Mets, Robert batted .223/.303/.399 with 10 home runs and 23 RBI.

=== Baltimore Orioles ===
On August 31, 2026, Robert was claimed off of waivers by the Baltimore Orioles.

== International career ==
Before his defection, Robert represented the Cuban national team in international youth competition, including the 2015 18U Baseball World Cup, where he was named to the all-tournament team. He also played for the national team in June 2016, as part of a goodwill tour of the Can-Am League of independent baseball. Robert was also slated to represent Cuba in the 2017 World Baseball Classic, but was removed from consideration after his defection.

Robert was named to the Cuban national team for 2023 World Baseball Classic. He, along with White Sox teammate Yoán Moncada, became the first active MLB players to play for Cuba after having defected. Robert said the situation was "a little strange, because there are some [defectors] who sadly cannot play." In the tournament, Robert batted .259/.286/.296, with seven hits and eight strikeouts in 27 at-bats.

== See also ==
- List of baseball players who defected from Cuba
- List of Chicago White Sox award winners and league leaders
- List of Major League Baseball players from Cuba
