= List of Chicago White Sox award winners and league leaders =

This is a list of award winners and league leaders for the Chicago White Sox professional baseball team.

== Awards ==
=== Most Valuable Player ===
- 1959 – Nellie Fox
- 1972 – Dick Allen
- 1993 – Frank Thomas
- 1994 – Frank Thomas
- 2020 – José Abreu

=== Cy Young ===
- 1959 – Early Wynn (MLB)
- 1983 – LaMarr Hoyt (AL)
- 1993 – Jack McDowell (AL)

=== Rolaids Relief Man Award ===
- 1990 – Bobby Thigpen

=== Mariano Rivera AL Reliever of the Year Award ===
- 2021 – Liam Hendriks

=== Rookie of the Year ===
- 1956 – Luis Aparicio
- 1963 – Gary Peters
- 1966 – Tommie Agee
- 1983 – Ron Kittle
- 1985 – Ozzie Guillén
- 2014 – José Abreu

=== Manager of the Year ===
- 1983 – Tony La Russa
- 1990 – Jeff Torborg
- 1993 – Gene Lamont
- 2000 – Jerry Manuel
- 2005 – Ozzie Guillén
- 2026 – Will Venable

=== Gold Glove Award ===
- Pitcher
  - Jim Kaat [3] (1973, Twins-White Sox, 1974–75, White Sox)
  - Mark Buehrle [3] (2009–11)
  - Jake Peavy (2012)
  - Dallas Keuchel (2021)
- Catcher
  - Sherm Lollar [3] (1957–59)
- First base
  - Jim Spencer (1977)
  - Mike Squires (1981)
- Second base
  - Nellie Fox [3] (1957, 1959–60)
  - Yolmer Sanchez (2019)
- Third base
  - Robin Ventura [5] (1991–93, 1996, 1998)
- Shortstop
  - Luis Aparicio [7] (1958–62, 1968, 1970)
  - Ozzie Guillén (1990)
- Outfield
  - Jim Landis [5] (1960–64)
  - Tommie Agee (1966)
  - Ken Berry (1970)
  - Minnie Miñoso [2] (1957, 1960)
  - Luis Robert (2020)

=== Silver Slugger Award ===
- DH
  - Frank Thomas [2] (1991, 2000)
  - Harold Baines (1989)
  - Julio Franco (1994)
- Catcher
  - Carlton Fisk [3] (1981, 1985, 1988)
- First baseman
  - Frank Thomas [2] (1993–94)
  - José Abreu [3] (2014, 2018, 2020)
- Second baseman
  - Chase Meidroth (2026)
- Third baseman
  - Joe Crede (2006)
- Shortstop
  - Alexei Ramírez [2] (2010, 2014)
  - Tim Anderson (2020)
- Outfielders
  - Albert Belle (1998)
  - Magglio Ordóñez [2] (2000, 2002)
  - Jermaine Dye (2006)
  - Carlos Quentin (2008)
  - Eloy Jimenez (2020)
  - Luis Robert Jr. (2023)

=== Edgar Martínez Award ===
- Greg Luzinski (1981, 1983)
- Harold Baines (1987, 1988)

=== MLB "This Year in Baseball Awards" ===
Note: These awards were renamed the "GIBBY Awards" (Greatness in Baseball Yearly) in 2010 and then the "Esurance MLB Awards" in 2015,

==== "GIBBY Awards" Best Rookie ====
- 2014 – Jose Abreu

=== World Series Most Valuable Player Award ===
- 2005 – Jermaine Dye

=== DHL Hometown Heroes (2006) ===
- Frank Thomas — voted by MLB fans as the most outstanding player in the history of the franchise, based on on-field performance, leadership quality and character value

=== Baseball America All-Rookie Team ===
See: Baseball America#Baseball America All-Rookie Team

- 2011 – Chris Sale (RP; one of two)

=== Topps All-Star Rookie teams ===
- 1961
  - J. C. Martin (1B)
  - Charley Smith (3B)
  - Floyd Robinson (OF)
- 1963
  - Pete Ward (3B)
  - Al Weis (SS)
  - Gary Peters (LHP)
- 1966
  - Tommie Agee (OF)
- 1967
  - Walt Williams (OF)
- 1969
  - Carlos May (OF)
- 1974
  - Bucky Dent (SS)
- 1976
  - Chet Lemon (OF)
- 1978
  - Bill Nahorodny (C)
  - Bob Molinaro (OF)
- 1979
  - Ross Baumgarten (LHP)
- 1980
  - Britt Burns (LHP)
- 1983
  - Ron Kittle (OF)
- 1985
  - Ozzie Guillén (SS)
- 1988
  - Dave Gallagher (OF)
- 1989
  - Carlos Martinez (1B)
- 1990
  - Robin Ventura (3B)
  - Scott Radinsky (LHP)
- 1995
  - Ray Durham (2B)
- 1998
  - Mike Caruso (SS)
  - Magglio Ordóñez (OF)
- 1999
  - Chris Singleton (OF)
- 2003
  - Miguel Olivo (C)
- 2005
  - Tadahito Iguchi (2B)
- 2008
  - Alexei Ramírez (2B)
- 2009
  - Chris Getz (2B)
  - Gordon Beckham (3B)
- 2012
  - Addison Reed (RHP)
- 2014
  - José Abreu (1B)
- 2015
  - Carlos Rodón (LHP)
- 2019
  - Eloy Jiménez (OF)
- 2020
  - Luis Robert (OF)

=== Babe Ruth Award (postseason MVP) ===
- 2005 – Jermaine Dye

=== Sporting News Performance of the Decade (2009) ===
- Mark Buehrle's perfect game against Tampa Bay on July 23, 2009 (only pitcher with two no-hitters in the decade, including game on April 18, 2007)

== Team award ==
- 1959 – American League championship
- 2000 – Baseball America Organization of the Year
- 2005 – William Harridge Trophy (American League champion)
- 2005 – Commissioner's Trophy (World Series)
- 2011 – Commissioner's Award for Philanthropic Excellence
- 2012 – Steve Patterson Award for Excellence in Sports Philanthropy

== Minor-league system ==
=== MiLB Overall Starter of the Year ===
- 2009 – Daniel Hudson

== Other achievements ==
=== Baseball Hall of Famers ===
See Chicago White Sox#Baseball Hall of Famers

=== Ford C. Frick Award recipients (broadcasters) ===
See Chicago White Sox#Ford C. Frick Award recipients

=== Retired numbers ===
See Chicago White Sox#Retired numbers

=== Chicagoland Sports Hall of Fame ===
White Sox in the Chicagoland Sports Hall of Fame
No.	Player	Position	Tenure	Notes
15	Dick Allen	1B/3B	1972–1974	
11	Luis Aparicio	SS	1956–1962, 1968–1970	
4, 5, 8	Luke Appling	SS	1930–1943, 1945–1950	
—	Harry Caray	Broadcaster	1971–1981	
44	Phil Cavarretta	1B/OF	1954–1955	Elected mainly on his performance with Chicago Cubs, born in Chicago
—	Grace Comiskey	Owner	1939–1956	
—	Chuck Comiskey	Owner	1956–1961	
—	Charles Comiskey	Owner	1901–1931	Born in Chicago
14, 32	Larry Doby	CF; Manager	1956–1957, 1959; 1978	Elected mainly on his performance with Cleveland Indians.
5, 7	Jimmy Dykes	3B/2B; Manager	1933–1939; 1934–1946	
22	Ed Farmer	P	1979–1981	Attended Chicago State University
2, 26	Nellie Fox	2B	1950–1963	
2, 5, 16, 24, 25, 36	Bob Kennedy	OF/3B	1939–1942, 1946–1948; 1955–1957	Born in Chicago
10, 45	Sherm Lollar	C	1952–1963	
10, 42	Al López	Manager	1957–1965, 1968–1969	
14, 16	Ted Lyons	P Manager	1923–1942, 1946; 1946–1948	
14	Bill Melton	3B	1968–1975	
9	Minnie Miñoso	LF	1951–1957, 1960–1961; 1964, 1976, 1980	
19	Billy Pierce	P	1949–1961	
—	Jerry Reinsdorf	Owner	1981–present	
29	Johnny Rigney	P	1937–1942, 1946–1947	Born in Oak Park
7, 39	Jim Rivera	OF	1952–1961	
21	Scott Sanderson	P	1994	
10	Ron Santo	3B	1974	Elected mainly on his performance with Chicago Cubs
32, 35	Bob Shaw	P	1958–1961	
5, 14	Bill Skowron	1B	1964–1967	Born in Chicago
—	Bill Veeck	Owner	1959–1981	Born in Chicago, grew up in Hinsdale
8	Pete Ward	3B/LF/1B	1963–1969	
28	Wilbur Wood	P	1967–1978	
24, 32	Early Wynn	P	1958–1962	

== See also ==
- Baseball awards
- List of MLB awards

== Footnotes ==
Awards and achievements
Preceded by New York Giants; 1905	World Series Champions; Chicago White Sox; 1906	Succeeded by Chicago Cubs; 1907
Preceded by Boston Red Sox; 1916	World Series Champions; Chicago White Sox; 1917	Succeeded by Boston Red Sox; 1918
Preceded by Boston Red Sox; 2004	World Series Champions; Chicago White Sox; 2005	Succeeded by St. Louis Cardinals; 2006

Awards and achievements
Preceded by First American League Champions	American League Champions; Chicago White Sox; 1900 and 1901	Succeeded by Philadelphia Athletics; 1902
Preceded by Philadelphia Athletics; 1905	American League Champions; Chicago White Sox; 1906	Succeeded by Detroit Tigers; 1907
Preceded by Boston Red Sox; 1916	American League Champions; Chicago White Sox; 1917	Succeeded by Boston Red Sox; 1918
Preceded by Boston Red Sox; 1918	American League Champions; Chicago White Sox; 1919	Succeeded by Cleveland Indians; 1920
Preceded by New York Yankees; 1958	American League Champions; Chicago White Sox; 1959	Succeeded by New York Yankees; 1960
Preceded by Boston Red Sox; 2004	American League Champions; Chicago White Sox; 2005	Succeeded by Detroit Tigers; 2006

Awards and achievements
Preceded by California Angels; 1982	American League West Champions; Chicago White Sox; 1983	Succeeded by Kansas City Royals; 1984
Preceded by Oakland Athletics; 1992	American League West Champions; Chicago White Sox; 1993	Succeeded by Seattle Mariners; 1995
Preceded by Cleveland Indians; 1999	American League Central Champions; Chicago White Sox; 2000	Succeeded by Cleveland Indians; 2001
Preceded by Minnesota Twins; 2004	American League Central Champions; Chicago White Sox; 2005	Succeeded by Minnesota Twins; 2006
Preceded by Cleveland Indians; 2007	American League Central Champions; Chicago White Sox; 2008	Succeeded by Incumbent; 2009
