= Intercontinental Series =

Cancelled baseball tournament

The Intercontinental Professional Baseball Series (IPBS; Spanish: Serie Intercontinental de Béisbol Profesional) was a planned international club tournament to be contested by winter league professional baseball teams, as an alternative to the Caribbean Series. The first edition was scheduled to take place in from January 26 to February 1, 2024, in Barranquilla, Colombia, but was ultimately cancelled.

The series was expected to feature a Cuban team made up of expatriate and defected players in the United States, rather than the officially-sanctioned champion of the Cuban Elite League. This caused to the Colombian government refusing to endorse the tournament, leading to its cancellation.

== Background ==
The Intercontinental Series grew out of the Latin American Series, which was held between 2013 and 2019 as the premier club tournament for winter leagues not recognized by the Caribbean Professional Baseball Confederation (CPBC). The impetus for the Latin American Series eventually faded, as the CPBC expanded the Caribbean Series by inviting the league champions from Colombia, Panama, and Curaçao. However, after three years of participation, the Colombian league was not invited to the 2024 Caribbean Series stemming from a financial dispute.

Instead, organizers in Colombia explored the idea of reviving the discontinued Latin American Series. "The idea is that the countries that had already been there [at the Latin American Series] participate, along with those from different continents. We want to bring together more countries to have this celebration, as we did with the Latin American Series," said Édinson Rentería, a Colombian baseball executive and brother of Édgar Rentería.

The tournament was criticized by Jordan Díaz, who said that Colombian baseball should seek a return to the Caribbean Series instead of "returning to the past." It was also criticized by Juan Reinaldo Pérez, president of the Baseball Federation of Cuba (FCB), who noted that the Cuban Elite League had been invited but declined to participate; Pérez said that the Intercontinental Series, while claiming to be "a league of champions," is composed of "invited teams, and teams that aren't champions of any league."

It was announced that the Cuban team would be organized by FEPCUBE, a team that boasts exiles-turned-pros from MLB, winter leagues, and Asia, all guided by top-notch coaching. It marks the first international tournament to include a team not sanctioned by the Cuban government, composed almost entirely of Cuban baseball players who escaped the Cuban regime. The team is expected to include Aroldis Chapman, Yandy Díaz, Lourdes Gurriel Jr., Yennier Canó, and other players who are all ineligible to play organized Cuban baseball.

== Cancellation ==
The Colombian Ministry of Sport distanced itself from the tournament. In a statement on January 9, it characterized the tournament as a "private, invitational event" not funded by the Colombian government or the Colombian Baseball Federation. It noted that FCB, not FEPCUBE, is the only authority recognized by both the Colombian Baseball Federation and the World Baseball Softball Confederation (WBSC).

Team Rentería USA, organizers of the Intercontinental Series, announced on January 16 that the Barranquilla tournament would be cancelled. Reportedly, the Colombian government was pressured by Cuba to withdraw support for the tournament, in return for Cuban support for Barranquilla's bid to host the 2027 Pan American Games.

== Participants ==
Country	League	First edition
Colombia	Colombian Professional Baseball League	2024
Cuba	FEPCUBE	2024
Curaçao	Curaçao Professional Baseball League	2024
Japan	Nihonkai League Baseball	2024
South Korea		2024
United States	Western League	2024
