= List of Cuban baseball champions =

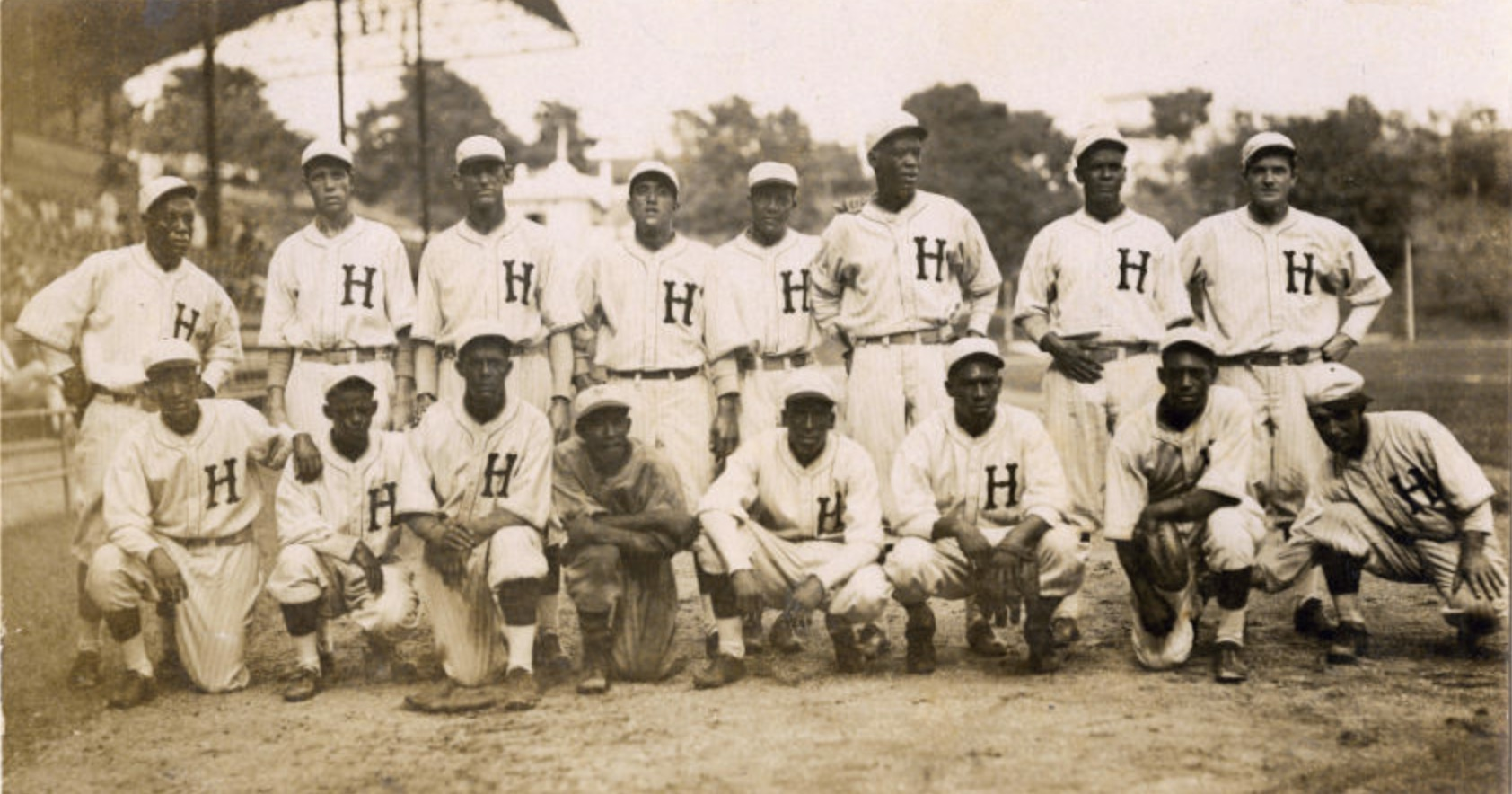
Habana, pictured in its title-winning 1928–29 season, won 30 championships over the course of its existence.

The Cuban baseball champions are the winners of the highest division in the Cuban baseball league system. Organized baseball in Cuba originated with the Cuban League in 1878, which was dissolved during the Cuban Revolution and replaced by the Cuban National Series in 1961.

Early organized Cuban baseball was dominated by teams from the Havana metropolitan area. The most successful teams were Club Habana (which won a record 30 championships, including the first tournament in 1879) and Almendares. In the modern-era of Cuban baseball, starting with the establishment of the National Series in 1961, teams from other parts of the country have enjoyed more success, although Industriales of Havana still hold the most titles (12).

For the entire history of the Cuban League and National Series up to 1985, the champion was determined by win-loss record. (Note: In the 1962–63 Cuban National Series, Industriales defeated Oriente 2–1 in a three-game series to determine the title, though it was considered a regular-season tiebreaker rather than a championship series.) The 1985–86 season was the first to incorporate a postseason, in the form of a double round-robin system between four teams; this system has been maintained, with slight changes, up to the present day.

== List of champions ==
Key
†	Champions also won the Caribbean Series that season

=== Cuban League (1878–1961) ===
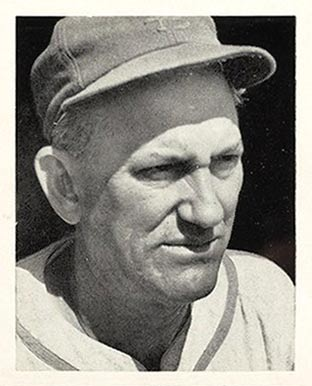
Miguel González won 14 Cuban League titles as manager of Habana

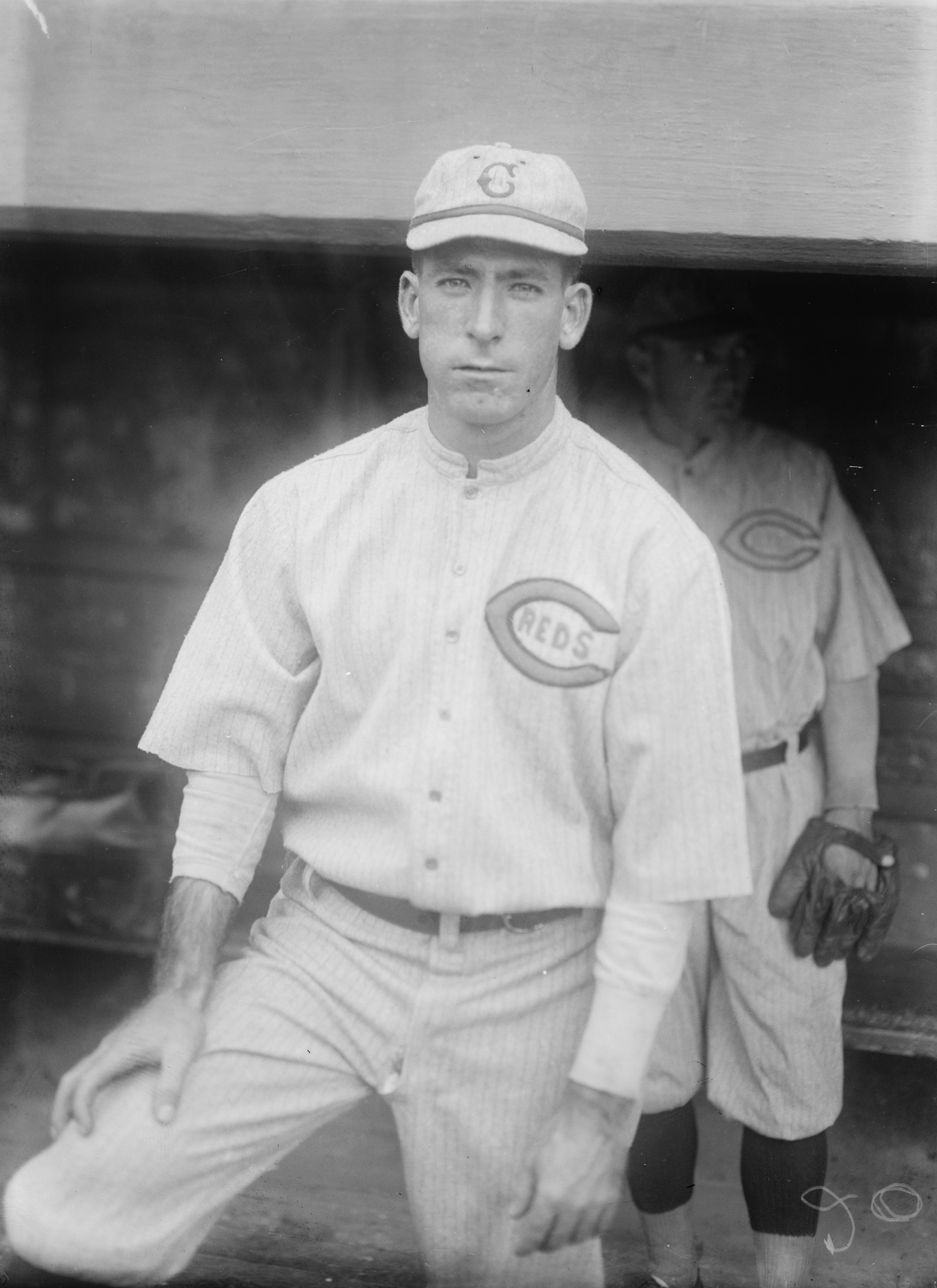
Adolfo Luque won the second-most titles (9), mainly with Almendares

Season	Champions	Record	Manager
1878–79	Habana (1)	4–0–1	Esteban Bellán
1879–80	Habana (2)	5–2	Esteban Bellán
1880–81	Not held		
1881–82	Not completed		
1882–83	Habana (3)	5–1	Esteban Bellán
1883–84	Not held		
1884–85	Habana (4)	4–3	Ricardo Mora
1885–86	Habana (5)	6–0	Francisco Saavedra
1886–87	Habana (6)	10–2	Francisco Saavedra
1887–88	Fé (1)	12–3	Antonio Utrera
1888–89	Habana (7)	16–4–1	Emilio Sabourín
1889–90	Habana (8)	14–3	Emilio Sabourín
1890–91	Fé (2)	12–6	Luis Almoina
1891–92	Habana (9)	13–7	Emilio Sabourín
1892–93	Mantanzas (1)	14–9	Luis Almoina
1893–94	Almendares (1)	17–7–1	Ramón Gutiérrez
1894–98	Not held due to the Cuban War of Independence		
1898–99	Habanista (10)	9–3	Alberto Azoy
1900	San Francisco (1)	17–10–2	Patricio Silveiro
1901	Habana (11)	16–3–1	Alberto Azoy
1902	Habana (12)	17–0–2	Alberto Azoy
1903	Habana (13)	21–13	Alberto Azoy
1904	Habana (14)	16–4	Alberto Azoy
1905	Almendares (2)	19–11–2	Abel Linares
1906	Fé (3)	15–9	Alberto Azoy
1907	Almendares (3)	17–13–1	Eugenio Santa Cruz
1908	Almendares (4)	37–8–1	Juan Sánchez
1908–09	Habana (15)	29–13–1	Luis Someillan
1910	Almendares (5)	13–3–1	Juan Sánchez
1910–11	Almendares (6)	21–6–3	Juan Sánchez
1912	Habana (16)	22–12–1	Eduardo Laborde
1913	Fé (4)	21–11	Tinti Molina
1913–14	Almendares (7)	22–11–1	Eugenio Santa Cruz
1914–15	Habana (17)	23–11	Miguel Angel González
1915–16	Almendares (8)	30–12–3	Alfredo Cabrera
1917	Orientales (1)	8–6–1	Armando Marsans
1918–19	Habana (18)	29–19	Miguel Angel González
1919–20	Almendares (9)	22–5–2	Adolfo Luque
1920–21	Habana (19)	23–10–5	Miguel Angel González
1921	Habana (20)	4–1	Miguel Angel González
1922–23	Marianao (1)	35–19–1	Merito Acosta
1923–24	Santa Clara (1)	36–11–1	Tinti Molina
1924–25	Almendares (10)	33–16–1	Joseíto Rodríguez
1925–26	Almendares (11)	34–13–2	Joseíto Rodríguez
1926–27	Habana (21)	20–11	Miguel Angel González
1926–27 (Note: In the alternate Triangal League (Spanish: Serie Triangular))	Alacranes (12)	22–15	Adolfo Luque
1927–28	Habana (22)	24–13	Miguel Angel González
1928–29	Habana (23)	43–12–1	Miguel Angel González
1929–30	Cienfuegos	33–19–2	Pelayo Chacón
1930–31 (Note: The regular Cuban League season was suspended due to poor attendance, so a separate tournament, known as the Single Championship (Spanish: Campeonato Unico) was organized.)	Almendarista (13)	9–4–1	Joseíto Rodríguez
1931–32	Almendares (14)	21–9–4	Joseíto Rodríguez
1932–33	Almendares (15)	13–9	Adolfo Luque
1932–33	Habana (24)	13–9	Miguel Angel González
1934–35	Almendares (16)	18–9–1	Adolfo Luque
1935–36	Santa Clara (2)	34–14–1	Martín Dihigo
1936–37	Marianao (2)	38–31–3	Martín Dihigo
1937–38	Santa Clara (3)	44–18–4	Lázaro Salazar
1938–39	Santa Clara (2)	34–20–2	Lázaro Salazar
1939–40	Almendares (17)	28–23–1	Adolfo Luque
1940–41	Habana (25)	31–18–5	Miguel Angel González
1941–42	Almendares (18)	25–19–4	Adolfo Luque
1942–43	Almendares (19)	28–20–1	Adolfo Luque
1943–44	Habana (26)	32–16	Miguel Angel González
1944–45	Almendares (20)	32–16–6	Reinaldo Cordeiro
1945–46	Cienfuegos (2)	37–23–4	Adolfo Luque
1946–47	Almendares (21)	42–24–2	Adolfo Luque
1947–48	Habana (27)	39–33–9	Miguel Angel González
1948–49	Almendares (22) ^{†}	47–25	Fermín Guerra
1949–50	Almendares (23)	38–34–4	Fermín Guerra
1950–51	Habana (28)	41–32–1	Miguel Angel González
1951–52	Habana (29) ^{†}	41–30–1	Miguel Angel González
1952–53	Habana (30)	43–29–1	Miguel Angel González
1953–54	Almendares (24)	44–28–1	Bobby Bragan
1954–55	Almendares (25)	44–25–2	Bobby Bragan
1955–56	Cienfuegos (3) ^{†}	37–23–4	Oscar Rodríguez
1956–57	Tigres de Marianao (3) ^{†}	40–28–1	Napoleon Reyes
1957–58	Tigres de Marianao (4) ^{†}	43–32–2	Napoleon Reyes
1958–59	Almendares (26) ^{†}	44–25–2	Clemente Carreras
1959–60	Cienfuegos (4) ^{†}	46–26–6	Antonio Castaño
1960–61	Cienfuegos (5)	35–31–1	Antonio Castaño

=== Cuban National Series (1961–2022) ===
==== Single-table era (1961–1985) ====
Season	Champions	Record	Manager
1961–62	Occidentales (1)	18–9	Fermín Guerra
1962–63	Industriales (1)	16–14	Ramón Carneado
1963–64	Industriales (2)	22–13	Ramón Carneado
1964–65	Industriales (3)	25–14	Ramón Carneado
1965–66	Industriales (4)	40–25	Ramón Carneado
1966–67	Orientales (1)	36–29	Roberto Ledo
1967–68	Habana (1)	74–25	Juan "Coco" Gómez
1968–69	Azucareros (1)	69–30	Servio Borges
1969–70	Henequeros (1)	50–16	Miguel Ángel Domínguez
1970–71	Azucareros (2)	49–16	Pedro Pérez Delgado
1971–72	Azucareros (3)	52–14	Servio Borges
1972–73	Industriales (5)	53–25	Pedro Chávez
1973–74	Habana (2)	52–26	Jorge Trigoura
1974–75	Agricultores (1)	24–15	Orlando Leroux
1975–76	Ganaderos (1)	29–9	Carlos Gómez
1976–77	Citricultores (1)	26–12	Juan Bregio
1977–78	Vegueros (1)	36–14	José Miguel Pineda
1978–79	Sancti Spíritus (1)	36–14	Candido Andrade
1979–80	Santiago de Cuba (1)	36–14	Manuel Miyar
1980–81	Vegueros (2)	36–15	José Miguel Pineda
1981–82	Vegueros (3)	36–14	Jorge Fuentes
1982–83	Villa Clara (4)	41–8	Eduardo Luis Martín
1983–84	Citricultores (2)	52–23	Tomás Soto
1984–85	Vegueros (4)	57–18	Jorge Fuentes

==== Postseason era (1986-present) ====
Season	Winning team	Manager	Record	Games	Losing team
1985–86	Industriales (6)	Pedro Chávez	37–11	6–0	Vegueros
1986–87	Vegueros (5)	Jorge Fuentes	34–14	5–1	Santiago de Cuba
1987–88	Vegueros (6)	Jorge Fuentes	39–9	5–1	Santiago de Cuba
1988–89	Santiago de Cuba (2)	Higinio Vélez	29–19	5–1	Industriales
1989–90	Henequeneros (1)	Gerardo Junco	37–11	4–2	Santiago de Cuba
1990–91	Henequeneros (2)	Gerardo Junco	33–15	6–1	Camagüey
1991–92	Industriales (7)	Jorge Trigoura	36–12	7–1	Henequeneros
1992–93	Villa Clara (5)	Pedro Jova	42–23	8–3	Pinar del Río
1993–94	Villa Clara (6)	Pedro Jova	43–22	8–5	Industriales
1994–95	Villa Clara (7)	Pedro Jova	44–18	8–2	Pinar del Río
1995–96	Industriales (8)	Pedro Medina	41–22	8–2	Villa Clara
1996–97	Pinar del Río (7)	Jorge Fuentes	50–15	8–0	Villa Clara
1997–98	Pinar del Río (8)	Jorge Fuentes	56–34	11–5	Santiago de Cuba
1998–99	Santiago de Cuba (3)	Higinio Vélez	46–44	11–7	Industriales
1999–00	Santiago de Cuba (4)	Higinio Vélez	62–28	11–0	Pinar del Río
2000–01	Santiago de Cuba (5)	Higinio Vélez	55–35	11–4	Pinar del Río
2001–02	Holguín (1)	Héctor Hernández	55–35	11–6	Sancti Spíritus
2002–03	Industriales (9)	Rey Vicente Anglada	66–23	11–2	Villa Clara
2003–04	Industriales (10)	Rey Vicente Anglada	52–38	11–4	Villa Clara
2004–05	Santiago de Cuba (6)	Antonio Pacheco	55–35	11–2	La Habana
2005–06	Industriales (11)	Rey Vicente Anglada	56–34	11–7	Santiago de Cuba
2006–07	Santiago de Cuba (7)	Antonio Pacheco	57–32	11–6	Industriales
2007–08	Santiago de Cuba (8)	Antonio Pacheco	61–29	11–0	Pinar del Río
2008–09	La Habana (1)	Esteban Lombillo	57–33	12–4	Villa Clara
2009–10	Industriales (12)	Germán Mesa	47–43	12–6	Villa Clara
2010–11	Pinar del Río (9)	Alfonso Urquiola	50–39	12–6	Ciego de Ávila
2011–12	Ciego de Ávila (1)	Roger Machado	54–42	12–6	Industriales
2012–13	Villa Clara (8)	Ramon Moret	24–21	8–2	Matanzas
2013–14	Pinar del Río (10) ^{†}	Alfonso Urquiola	52–35	8–5	Matanzas
2014–15	Ciego de Ávila (2)	Roger Machado	50–37	8–4	Isla de la Juventud
2015–16	Ciego de Ávila (3)	Roger Machado	54–32	8–3	Pinar del Río
2016–17	Granma (1)	Carlos Martí	50–40	8–3	Ciego de Ávila
2017–18	Granma (2)	Carlos Martí	49–39	8–4	Las Tunas
2018–19	Las Tunas (1)	Pablo Alberto Civil	51–39	8–2	Villa Clara
2019–20	Matanzas (1)	Armando Ferrer	52–38	7–3	Las Tunas
2020–21	Granma (3)	Carlos Martí	48–27	11–6	Matanzas
2022	Granma (4)	Carlos Martí	43–32	4–3	Matanzas
2023	Las Tunas (2)	Abeysi Pantoja	45–29	4–0	Industriales
2024	Las Tunas (3)	Abeysi Pantoja	42–28	4–1	Pinar del Río
2025–26	Matanzas (2)	Armando Ferrer	46–29	4–0	Las Tunas

== Other competitions ==
=== Selective Series (1975–1995) ===
Season	Champions	Record	Manager
1975	Oriente (1)	33–21	José Carrillo
1976	Habana (1)	34–20	Roberto Ledo
1977	Camagüeyanos (1)	36–18	Carlos Gómez
1978	Las Villas (1)	35–25	Eduardo Martín
1979	Pinar del Ríó (1)	40–20	José Pineda
1980	Pinar del Ríó (2)	39–20	José Pineda
1981	Orientales (1)	38–22	Carlos Martí
1982	Pinar del Ríó (3)	35–22	Jorge Fuentes
1983	Las Villas (2)	42–18	Eduardo Martín
1984	Pinar del Ríó (4)	28–15	Jorge Fuentes
1985	Las Villas (3)	26–19	Eduardo Martín
1986	Serranos (1)	41–22	Frangel Reynaldo
1987	Serranos (2)	42–21	Higinio Vélez
1988	Pinar del Ríó (5)	40–23	Jorge Fuentes
1989	Las Villas (4)	45–18	Abelardo Triana
1990	Ciudad Habana (2)	46–17	Servio Borges
1991	Pinar del Ríó (6)	41–22	Jorge Fuentes
1992	Serranos (3)	36–27	Higinio Vélez
1993	Orientales (2)	25–20	Frangel Reynaldo
1994	Occidentales (1)	27–18	Jorge Fuentes
1995	Orientales (3)	29–16	Higinio Vélez

=== Super League (2002–2005) ===
Season	Winning team	Manager	Record	Finals	Losing team
2002	Habaneros (1)	Armando Johnson	17–12	2–1	Centrales
2003	Centrales (1)	Víctor Mesa	13–7	2–2	Occidentales
2004	Orientales (1)	Angel Sosa	7–8	2–0	industriales
2005	Occidentales (1)	Rey Vicente Anglada	15–13	2–0	Centrales

=== Elite League (2022-present) ===
Season	Winning team	Manager	Record	Finals	Losing team
2022–23	Agricultores (Las Tunas/Granma)	Carlos Martí	30–19	4–3	Portuarios (Industriales/Mayabeque)
2023–24	Matanzas	Armando Ferrer	25–15	4–2	Artemisa
2025	Ciego de Ávila	Danny Miranda	24–16	4–0	Las Tunas
2026	Industriales	Guillermo Carmona	24–16	4–1	Las Tunas

== See also ==
- List of World Series champions
- Japan Series
- Serie del Rey

== Bibliography ==
- Figueredo, Jorge S. (2003). Cuban Baseball: A Statistical History, 1878–1961. McFarland & Company. ISBN 0-7864-1250-X.
- Peter C. Bjarkman (2006). A History of Cuban Baseball, 1864–2006. McFarland & Company. ISBN 0-7864-2829-5.
- Peter C. Bjarkman; Bill Nowlin, eds. (2016). Cuban Baseball Legends: Baseball's Alternative Universe. SABR. ISBN 978-1-943816-24-8.
