= Pedro Chávez =

Cuban baseball player

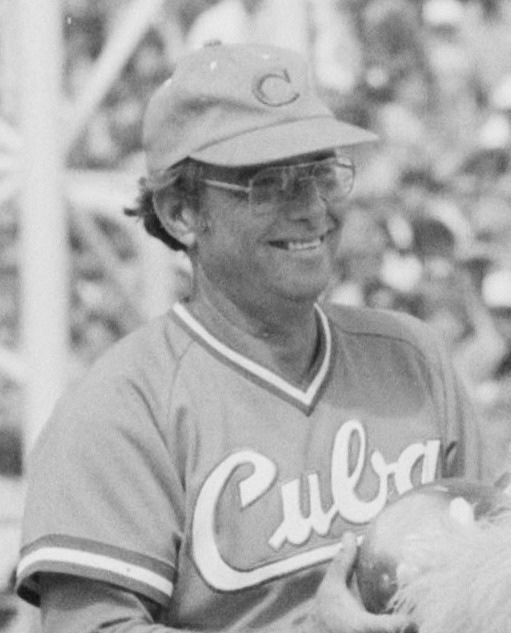
- Chávez at the 1986 Amateur World Series
- Outfielder / First baseman / Manager
- Born: June 7, 1936 (age 90); Quivicán, Cuba
- Bats: Right Throws: Right

SNB statistics
- Batting average: .287
- Home runs: 22
- Runs batted in: 192

Teams
- Occidentales (1962, 1963–64); Industriales (1962–63, 1964-1967); Habana (1967-1969)
Medals
Men's baseball
Representing Cuba
Baseball World Cup
Gold medal – first place	1961 San José	Team
Pan American Games
Gold medal – first place	1963 Sao Paulo	Team
Silver medal – second place	1967 Winnipeg	Team
Central American and Caribbean Games
Gold medal – first place	1966 San Juan	Team
International Amateur Tournament
Silver medal – second place	1968 Mexico City	Team

Pedro Chávez González (born June 7, 1936) is a Cuban former baseball player and manager. He spent most of his playing career with Industriales of the Cuban National Series (SNB). One of the league's early stars following the abolition of professional baseball in the country after the Cuban Revolution, he was a two-time batting champion and won the most valuable player in 1964. He also played with the Cuba national baseball team.

== Playing career ==
Chávez began his playing career at 16 in the Quivicán League, before playing four seasons in the top level Cuban Amateur League with the Santiago Sport Club of Santiago de las Vegas (1955), and Círculo de Artesanos (1956–1959), based in San Antonio de los Baños. He later moved to the independent Pedro Betancourt League, playing with the Araujo club managed by Andrés Fleitas, where he won the Triple Crown. During this period, Chávez was offered a contract by Tom Greenwade of Major League Baseball's New York Yankees in 1957, but declined, citing a desire to stay closer to family. In 1960 he played with Planta Eléctrica and in 1961 he managed the Aeropuerto team in the Quivicán League.

Following the Cuban Revolution, the country's professional winter league was abolished and replaced with the Cuban National Series. At age 26, Chávez debuted in the first National Series with Occidentales. The following season, he joined Industriales, of Havana, under manager Ramón Carneado, becoming part of a dynasty that won four consecutive championships between 1963 and 1966, losing to Orientales in 1967. He won the batting title in 1967 in the final game of the season, finishing with two hits against Manuel Alarcón to end with a .318 average and beat out Félix Isasi (.317). In his final season, he played with Habana, managed by Juan "Coco" Gómez.

Over the course of his National Series career, Chávez won three championships: one with Occidentales (1962), three with Industriales (1963, 1964, 1966),and one with Habana (1968). He was absent for Industriales 1965 pennant win due to playing with Occidentales for the season. He won the two National Series batting titles, in 1964 (.333) and 1967 (.318), and was named the circuit's Most Valuable Player in 1964. He also led the league in hits (78 in 1967), triples (seven in 1964), RBIs (27 in 1964), and intentional walks (10 in 1967). He finished his National Series career with a .287 batting average and 22 home runs.

Chávez made his debut with the Cuba national baseball team at the 1959 Pan American Games in Chicago. At the 1961 Amateur World Series in San José, Costa Rica, he won his first international title with Cuba. He also appeared with Cuba at the 1963 Pan American Games, the 1966 Central American and Caribbean Games in 1966 in San Juan, Puerto Rico, the 1967 Games in Winnipeg, Canada, and at the unofficial tournament held after the 1968 Olympic Games in Mexico City. Chávez always batted third or fourth for the Cuban team between 1959 and 1968.

== Managerial career ==
After his retirement as a player, he became a coach and manager in the National Series. He steered Industriales to two championships in 1973 and 1986. He also managed with Metropolitanos and with La Habana.

As manager of the Cuban national team, he led the team to two consecutive world championships, first on home soil at the 1984 Amateur World Series in Havana, then at the 1986 Amateur World Series in the Netherlands. Chávez also led Cuba to an undefeated record at the 1986 Central American and Caribbean Games in the Dominican Republic.

== Legacy ==
Stan Grossfeld referred to Chávez as "Yaz before Yaz was Yaz."
