= Rey Vicente Anglada =

Cuban baseball player

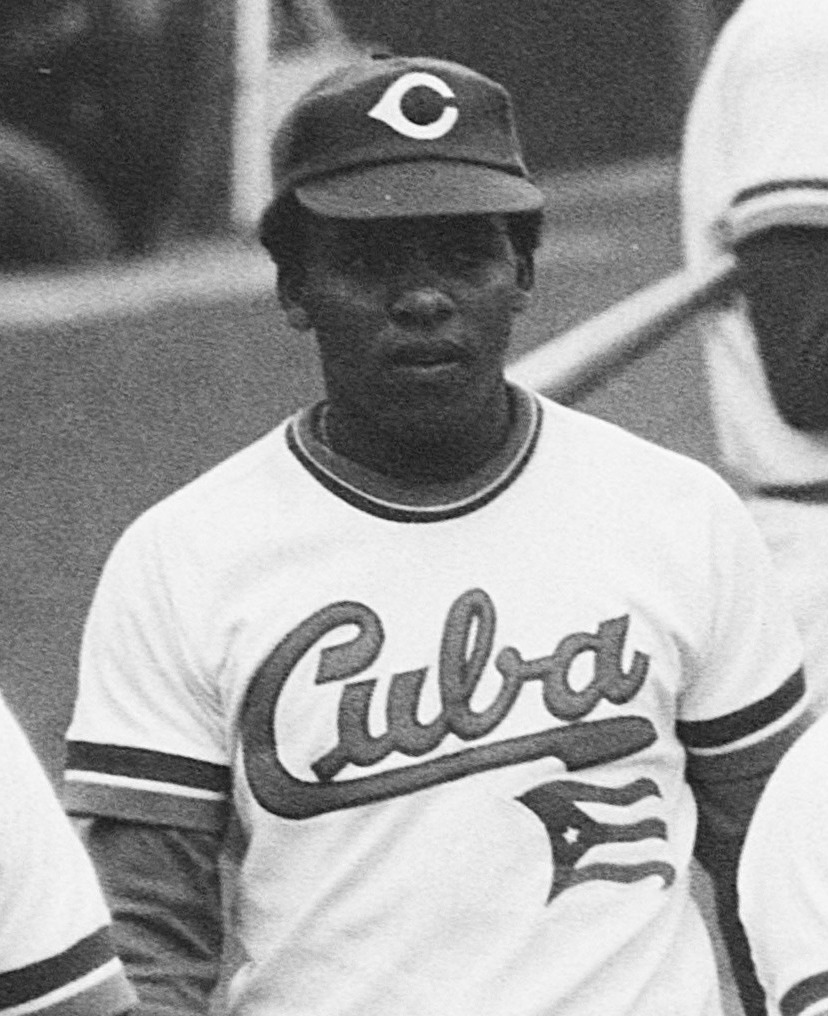
- Second baseman / Manager
- Born: January 6, 1953 (age 73); Havana, Cuba
- Bats: Right Throws: Right

SNB statistics
- Batting average: .291
- Home runs: 40
- Runs batted in: 303

Teams
- As player: Industriales (1972–1982); As manager: Industriales (2001–2007)
Medals
Men's baseball
Representing Cuba
Baseball World Cup
Gold medal – first place	1976 Havana	Team
Gold medal – first place	1978 Italy	Team
Pan American Games
Gold medal – first place	1979 San Juan	Team
Central American and Caribbean Games
Gold medal – first place	1978 Medellín	Team
Manager for Cuba
Intercontinental Cup
Gold medal – first place	2007 Taipei	Team
Pan American Games
Gold medal – first place	2007 Rio de Janeiro	Team
Central American and Caribbean Games
Gold medal – first place	2006 Cartagena	Team

Rey Vicente Anglada Ferrer (born 6 January 1953) is a Cuban former baseball player and manager. He played ten seasons in the Cuban National Series with Industriales, which he later managed to three championships in 2003, 2004, and 2006. He also played and managed the Cuba national baseball team.

== Playing career ==
Anglada debuted as a player with Industriales under manager Pedro Chávez in the 1971–72 Cuban National Series; he went on to play in ten National Series between 1972 and 1982, finishing with a .291 average, 109 doubles, 35 triples, 40 home runs, 303 runs batted in, and a slugging percentage of .398. An excellent defensive second baseman and base runner, René Arocha described him as a "spectacular" player, and said that Anglada would have been on the level of Hall-of-Famer Roberto Alomar had he played in the major leagues. During his playing career, he was reportedly offered a $150,000 contract to sign with the St. Louis Cardinals, but declined.

Anglada also played for the Cuba national baseball team that participated at the 1976 Amateur World Series in Havana, as well as the and 1978 Amateur World Series in Italy. He also participated at the 1978 Central American and Caribbean Games in Medellín, Colombia, and the 1979 Pan American Games in Puerto Rico. In Medellín he went 12-for-34 (.353) with two home runs and three walks.

In March 1982, Anglada's career was cut short when he and 16 other active players were implicated in a game-fixing scandal. Anglada vehemently denied the charges, but he was suspended by the Baseball Federation of Cuba and ultimately imprisoned for three years. After his serving his sentence, he did not return to playing baseball but instead worked as an electrician and truck driver.

== Managerial career ==
Anglada returned to baseball in 2001 when he was tapped to manage his former team, Industriales. He led the team to a championship in two consecutive years, 2003 and 2004, on both occasions defeating Villa Clara. Industriales again won the championship under Anglada in 2006, that time against Santiago de Cuba. After the 2007 season ended in a loss in the finals against Santiago, Anglada stepped down from his post as Industriales manager.

Anglada managed the Cuban national team from 2006 to 2008. While leading the national team, he won the Central American and Caribbean Games in Cartagena, as well as the 2007 Intercontinental Cup in Taipei and the 2007 Pan American Games in Rio de Janeiro.

He managed in Panama's provincial circuit, the Campeonato de Béisbol Mayor, steering Bocas del Toro in 2009, 2010, and 2017, and Colón in 2012, 2013, and 2015; during this period, he served on the coaching staff of the Panamanian youth team that competed at the 2012 18U Baseball World Championship. In 2016, he managed his first professional club, the Orientales de Granada of the Nicaraguan Professional Baseball League.

In 2019, he was again appointed to head the national team for the 2019 Pan American Games; he was slated to also manage at the 2019 WBSC Premier12, but was ultimately replaced by Miguel Borroto.

Anglada was originally announced as the manager for the El Salvador at the 2023 Central American and Caribbean Games, but he was ultimately replaced by Jorge Luis Avellan after the two sides failed to agree on contractual terms.
