= Mike Guerra =

Cuban baseball player (1912–1992)

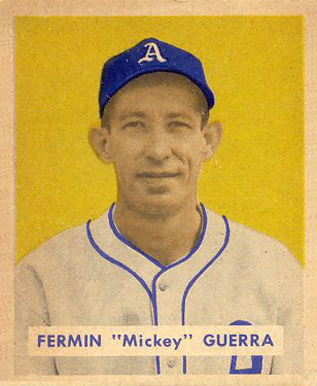
- Catcher
- Born: October 11, 1912; Havana, Cuba
- Died: October 9, 1992 (aged 79); Miami Beach, Florida, U.S.
- Batted: Right Threw: Right

MLB debut
- September 19, 1937, for the Washington Senators

Last MLB appearance
- September 23, 1951, for the Washington Senators

MLB statistics
- Batting average: .242
- Home runs: 9
- Runs batted in: 168
- Stats at Baseball Reference

Teams
- Washington Senators (1937, 1944–1946); Philadelphia Athletics (1947–1950); Boston Red Sox (1951); Washington Senators (1951)

Fermín Guerra Romero (October 11, 1912 – October 9, 1992), nicknamed "Mike" in the United States, was a Cuban professional baseball catcher who played in Major League Baseball (MLB) for the Washington Senators (1937; 1944–46; 1951), Philadelphia Athletics (1947–50) and Boston Red Sox (1951). Guerra also played Cuban Winter League baseball for two decades, 1934–55. He was listed as 5 feet 10 inches (1.78 m) tall and 155 pounds (70 kg), and threw and batted right-handed.

Guerra was born in Havana. In nine Major League seasons, he played in 565 games. In 1,581 at bats and 1,750 plate appearances; Guerra recorded 168 runs scored, 382 hits, 42 doubles, 14 triples, nine home runs, 168 runs batted in (RBI), 25 stolen bases, 131 bases on balls, a .242 batting average, .300 on-base percentage, .303 slugging percentage, 479 total bases, and 37 sacrifice hits.

Guerra managed in the first edition of the Cuban National Series in 1962, the first season to be held after the abolition of professional baseball in Cuba; his team, the Occidentales ("Westerners"), won the tournament, finishing with an 18–9 record. However, he later fell out of favor with the regime of Fidel Castro, at one point reportedly being sent to pick potatoes in Camagüey. He returned to manage in the National Series in the 1966–67 season, replacing Ramón Carneado at the helm of Industriales; despite a second-place finish, he again fell out of favor by listening to Voice of America broadcasts.

Guerra died in Miami Beach, Florida, two days before his 80th birthday.
