= Frank Montieth =

Cuban baseball player

Free agent
- Pitcher
- Born: 11 January 1985 (age 40)
- Bats: Right Throws: Right
Medals
Representing Cuba
Summer Olympics
Gold medal – first place	2004 Athens	Team
Baseball World Cup
Gold medal – first place	2005 Rotterdam	Team
Intercontinental Cup
Gold medal – first place	2006 Taichung	Team
Central American and Caribbean Games
Gold medal – first place	2006 Cartagena	Team

Frank Andy Montieth Herrera (born 11 January 1985) is a Cuban baseball pitcher.

He pitches for the Industriales of the Cuban National Series.

He has also competed extensively for the Cuban national baseball team, winning a gold medal at the 2004 Summer Olympics in Athens. Montieth bats and throws right-handed.

== Career ==
Montieth debuted in the Cuban National Series in the 2003–04 season.

He went 2–3 with 13 saves and a 2.34 ERA for the Industriales. That year, Montieth won the Cuban National Series Rookie of the Year Award, beating out Yoenis Céspedes.

During the regular season of the 2005-06 Cuban National Series, Montieth was 7–5 with a 3.13 ERA. During the three-round playoffs, he went 4–2, leading the team in wins as Industriales went on to win the title.

In 2015, he played for the Cuban national baseball team at the 2015 WBSC Premier12.

In the seasons 2016, 2017 and 2018, besides still pitching for the Industriales and Cuban national baseball team, Montieth also play in Italy in the Italian Baseball Championship Serie A Federale for Athletics Bologna.

Baseball Statistics 2016 and 2017 with Athletics Bologna – Italy – Serie A Federale League :

Year	Era	W-L	Gs	Cg	Sho	Ip	H	R	Er	Bb	So	2B	3B	Hr	Ab	B/Avg	Wp	Hbp	Bk	Sfa	Sha
2016	1.51	7–2	13	1	1	95.2	53	20	16	31	110	2	4	0	328	.162	6	7	0	0	11
2017	0.84	7–1	12	4	3	96.0	50	15	9	17	132	12	1	2	330	.152	4	1	0	0	7
