= Agustín Marquetti =

Cuban baseball player

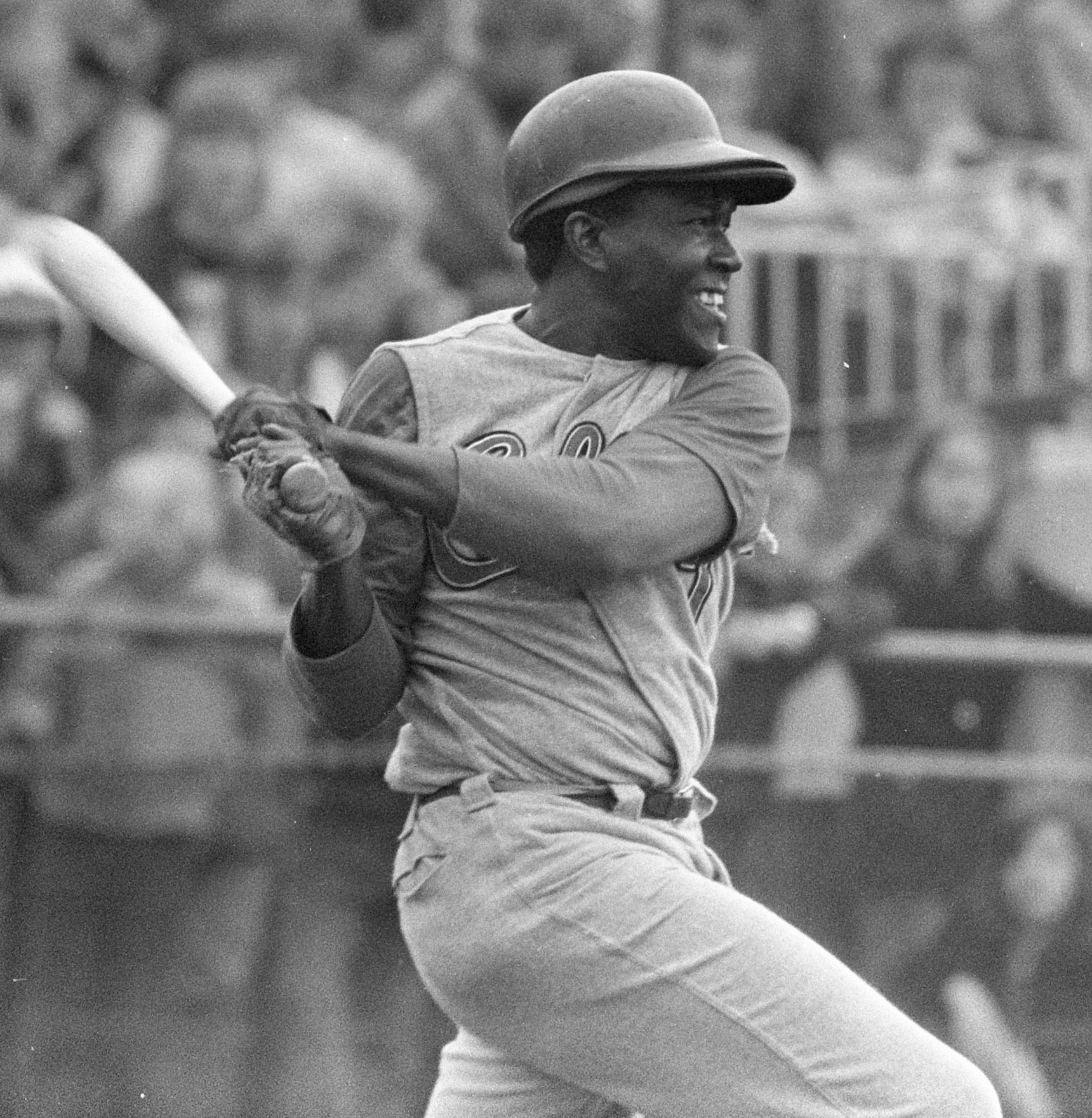
- Marquetti at the 1972 Haarlem Baseball Week
- First baseman / Outfielder
- Born: August 28, 1946 (age 79); Alquízar, Artemisa, Cuba
- Bats: Left Throws: Left

SNB statistics
- Batting average: .288
- Hits: 1,935
- Home runs: 207

Career highlights and awards
- Amateur World Series MVP (1973)
Medals
Men's baseball
Representing Cuba
Amateur World Series
| Gold medal – first place | 1969 Santo Domingo | Team |
| Gold medal – first place | 1970 Cartagena | Team |
| Gold medal – first place | 1972 Managua | Team |
| Gold medal – first place | 1973 Havana | Team |
| Gold medal – first place | 1976 Colombia | Team |
| Gold medal – first place | 1978 Italy | Team |
Intercontinental Cup
| Gold medal – first place | 1979 Havana | Team |
Pan American Games
| Gold medal – first place | 1971 Cali | Team |
| Gold medal – first place | 1975 Mexico City | Team |
| Gold medal – first place | 1979 San Juan | Team |
Central American and Caribbean Games
| Gold medal – first place | 1974 Santo Domingo | Team |
| Gold medal – first place | 1978 Medellin | Team |

Agustín Marquetti Moinelo (born August 28, 1946) is a Cuban former baseball player. He spent his 22-year career as a first baseman in the Cuban National Series (SNB) playing in Havana, mainly with Industriales.

Marquetti twice led the National Series in both home runs and runs batted in (1969 and 1972). Historian Peter C. Bjarkman described Marquetti as "the first great Cuban slugger of the modern-day era," adding that Marquetti made up half, along with his contemporary Antonio Muñoz, of Cuba's version of the M&M Boys (Roger Maris and Mickey Mantle).

== Early life ==
As a boy, Marquetti was a fan of Almendares in the Cuban Winter League. At just 15 years old, Marquetti was drafted into a militia raised against the anti-Castro invasion force at the Bay of Pigs; his military service gave him the nickname "El Miliciano." in 1964, he debuted with Havana at the 1964 national youth championship, earning a spot on the Cuban national youth team that played a series in Canada in August of that year. He was reportedly offered a contract with the Cincinnati Reds, but declined.

== Playing career ==
Debuting with Industriales in the 1965–66 Cuban National Series, Marquetti won a championship with the team in his first year. Over the course of his 22 seasons in the National Series, he posted a .288 career batting average, with 207 home runs and 1,935 hits.

Marquetti debuted with the senior Cuban national squad at the 1969 Amateur World Series in the Dominican Republic. Over the course of his international career, he hit .346 with 189 runs batted in and 31 home runs. He hit a walkoff home run against the United States in the 1972 Amateur World Series in Managua, to deliver Cuba the championship. He remained a consistent member of the national team until 1980, when he was supplanted at first base by Antonio Muñoz.

On January 19, 1986, the forty-year-old Marquetti hit a memorable walk-off home run off of Rogelio Garcia to deliver Industriales the championship over Pinar del Río in the final series of the 1985–86 Cuban National Series. As Marquetti later recounted, he had been chatting with Garcia just days earlier when the pitcher asserted his forkball was unhittable. Marquetti only managed to round second before fans mobbed the infield in celebration, an iconic image in Cuban baseball history.

== Personal life ==
Marquetti's son, also named Agustín, defected from Cuba and later played in the Detroit Tigers organization. Marquetti himself later relocated to Miami, where he opened a baseball academy with his son. However, he has since returned to visit Cuba periodically.

Marquetti said he at one time wanted to play in the Major Leagues, but that it would have been "unthinkable" to defect while playing with the national team. Discussing the recent trend of Cuban players defecting to the United States, he said that Cuban players of his generation "played with love, like you don't play there, in the Major Leagues." "I'm from that generation; this is another one, which can't think like mine ... We had the revolution in our blood. Now, people don't think that way anymore." Marquetti has expressed that defecting Cuban players should be allowed to rejoin the Cuban national team for events such as the World Baseball Classic.
