= Ramón Carneado =

Cuban baseball player (1919–1992)

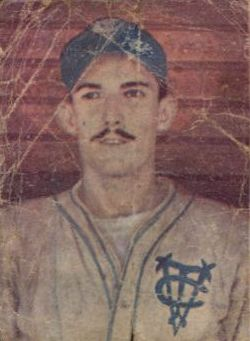
- Carneado in 1943
- Catcher / Manager
- Born: October 14, 1919; Havana, Cuba
- Died: November 23, 1992 (aged 73); Miami, Florida

Ramón Carneado (October 14, 1919 — November 23, 1992) was a Cuban baseball player and manager. He is best known as the manager of the Industriales team that won four consecutive Cuban National Series championships from 1963 to 1966.

Carneado played in the Cuban Amateur League as a catcher with the storied Vedado Tennis Club, and later with the "Caribes" of the Universidad de La Habana. He then signed a professional contract with the Tigres de Marianao of the Cuban Winter League. By the early 1950s, he had retired as a player, and went on to serve as a coach for Marianao. He served as an assistant coach for the Cuba national team under manager Clemente Carreras at the 1952 Amateur World Series in Havana. By the turn of the 1960s, he was managing Universidad, where he worked as a professor. In this capacity, he led the Cuban national collegiate team at the 1962 Latin American University Games, a one-time event held in Havana.

After Industriales failed to qualify for the first edition of the Cuban National Series, organized after professional baseball was abolished in the wake of the Cuban Revolution, Carneado took the manager job and led the team to qualify for the 1962–63 Cuban National Series. Industriales went on to finish with 16 wins and 14 losses, winning the league title. Under Carneado, the team repeated as champions in the next three seasons (1963–64, 1964–65, and 1965–66). Under Carneado, the team earned the slogan "El que le gane a los azules se muere" ("Whoever beats the Blues dies").

Despite his success at the helm of Industriales, Carneado was never appointed manager of Cuba's senior national team. After missing out on the managerial job for the 1966 Central American and Caribbean Games in Puerto Rico, the resulting controversy resulted in Carneado being removed from his position as Industriales manager. He was appointed director of baseball operations in the eastern provinces, and later returned to coach the Universidad team. He emigrated to the United States in 1984.

Carneado's four consecutives championships are unequaled in modern Cuban baseball. He is one of only two managers in the SNB to win championships in their first two seasons, the other being Abeysi Pantoja, who repeated the feat with the Leñadores de Las Tunas in 2024
