= Orlando Hernández =

Cuban baseball player (born 1965)

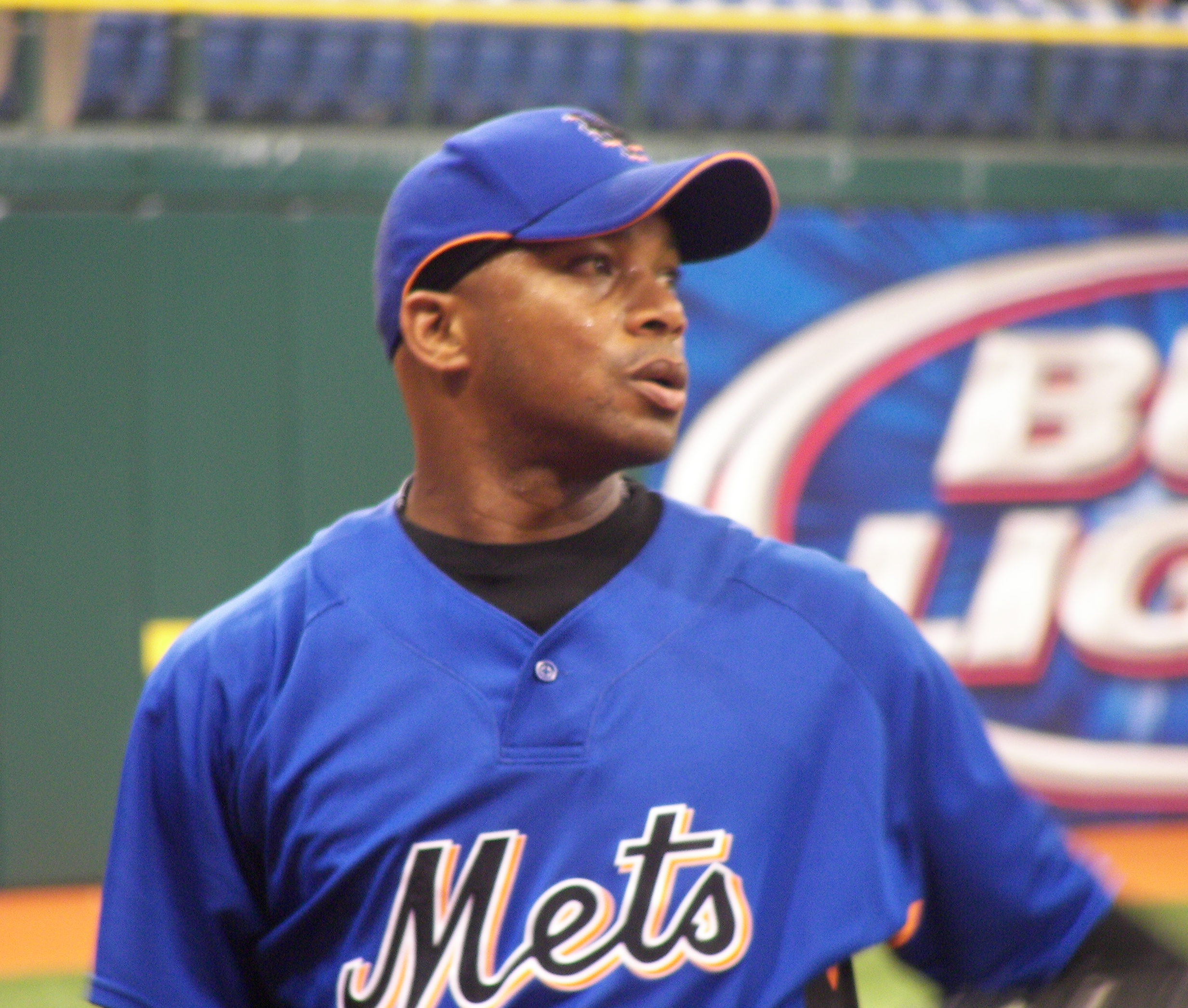
- Hernández with the New York Mets in 2007
- Pitcher
- Born: October 11, 1965 (age 61); Villa Clara, Cuba
- Batted: Right Threw: Right

MLB debut
- June 3, 1998, for the New York Yankees

Last MLB appearance
- September 30, 2007, for the New York Mets

MLB statistics
- Win–loss record: 90–65
- Earned run average: 4.13
- Strikeouts: 1,086
- Stats at Baseball Reference

Teams
- New York Yankees (1998–2002, 2004); Chicago White Sox (2005); Arizona Diamondbacks (2006); New York Mets (2006–2007)

Career highlights and awards
- 4× World Series champion (1998–2000, 2005); ALCS MVP (1999)
Medals
Men's baseball
Representing Cuba
Olympic Games
| Gold medal – first place | 1992 Barcelona | Team |
Baseball World Cup
| Gold medal – first place | 1988 Rome | Team |
| Gold medal – first place | 1990 Edmonton | Team |
| Gold medal – first place | 1994 Managua | Team |
Intercontinental Cup
| Gold medal – first place | 1993 Italy | Team |
| Gold medal – first place | 1995 Havana | Team |
Pan American Games
| Gold medal – first place | 1995 Mar del Plata | Team |
Central American and Caribbean Games
| Gold medal – first place | 1993 Ponce | Team |
Goodwill Games
| Gold medal – first place | 1990 Seattle | Team |

Orlando Hernández Pedroso (born October 11, 1965), nicknamed "El Duque" (Spanish for "The Duke"), is a Cuban-born right-handed former professional baseball pitcher. He pitched for the Industriales of the Cuban National Series, the New York Yankees, Chicago White Sox, Arizona Diamondbacks, and New York Mets of Major League Baseball, and the Cuban national baseball team in international play.

Hernández's greatest success came as a starting pitcher for the Yankees during that team's run of World Series championships in 1998, 1999, and 2000. He also won a World Series ring in 2005 with the Chicago White Sox. Hernández was the first player to win both an Olympic gold medal and the World Series.

Hernández was known for his extremely high leg kick and his frequent use of the Eephus pitch, as well as his success in the playoffs.

== Cuban career ==
Hernández played for Industriales of Havana in the Cuban National Series, helping the team win that title in 1992 and 1996. He also represented Havana in Selective Series, on teams including Ciudad Habana and Habaneros. He was 126–47 with 3.05 ERA over his ten-year career in the National Series. His career winning percentage in National and Selective Series, .728, is the league record.

Hernández was also a fixture on the Cuba national baseball team, and was part of the gold-winning Olympic team at Barcelona in 1992.

In September 1995, Hernández's half-brother, Liván Hernández, defected from Cuba. The Cuban national team left Hernández off of their roster in the 1996 Summer Olympics. Then in July 1996, Hernández was detained by Cuban state security and interrogated about his relationship to an American sports agent. Three months later, he was banned from Cuban baseball. On Christmas Day 1997, Hernández defected from Cuba, departing on a boat from the small city of Caibarién. The U.S. Coast Guard interdicted Hernández, his companion Noris Bosch, another baseball player named Alberto Hernández (no relation) and five others in Bahamian waters, delivering the entire party to Bahamian authorities in Freeport, who confined them in a detention center for illegal immigrants pending eventual repatriation to Cuba, the usual outcome of such cases. However, after lobbying by sports agent Joe Cubas and representatives of the Cuban-American National Foundation (CANF), then-Attorney General Janet Reno eventually offered both Hernándezes and Bosch a special status known as "humanitarian parole" that would allow them to enter the U.S., based on (1) what were judged to be realistic fears of persecution should they be returned to Cuba and (2) their status as exceptionally talented athletes, a class of person that — like exceptionally talented people in other professions — can qualify for special admission to the U.S. under State Department rules. However, Hernández declined this offer, eventually accepting an offer of asylum in Costa Rica. If he had immediately become a U.S. resident, he would have been subject to baseball's regular draft and could only have negotiated terms with the team that picked him. As a non-U.S. resident, however, he was able to negotiate as a free agent. After two months in Costa Rica, Hernández entered the U.S. on a visa arranged by the New York Yankees, with whom he had negotiated a four-year, $6.6 million contract.

== Major league career ==
=== New York Yankees ===
==== 1998 ====
In his first year in the Major Leagues in 1998, Hernández posted a 12–4 record with a 3.13 ERA. He was part of the Yankees' 1998 World Series-winning team that defeated the San Diego Padres. He finished in fourth place in AL Rookie of the Year voting.

==== 1999 ====
Hernández enjoyed his best year as a major league pitcher in 1999; he had a 17–9 record and set career highs in strikeouts (157) and innings pitched (214.1) as a Yankee. In one comical moment during a game against the New York Mets on June 5, 1999, Hernández fielded a ground ball by Rey Ordóñez and hurled his glove with the ball in it at first base to get the out. In the American League Championship Series, he was the starter in Game 1 and Game 5 against the Boston Red Sox. In fifteen combined innings over the two games, he allowed four runs (three earned) and was named ALCS MVP when the Yankees won the series in five games. In the 1999 World Series against the Atlanta Braves, he started Game 1 against Greg Maddux and allowed just one run on seven innings to earn the win in a series the Yankees won in a sweep.

==== 2000 ====
Hernández went 12–13 with a 4.51 ERA during the 2000 regular season. The Yankees then won their third straight World Series title, defeating the New York Mets. Over his first three postseasons from 1998 to 2000, Hernández performed well, going 8–1 with a 2.23 ERA.

==== 2001 ====
Hernández went 4–7 with a 4.85 ERA in 17 games (16 starts). The Yankees played in the World Series for the fourth year in a row, but were defeated by the Arizona Diamondbacks.

==== 2002 ====
Hernández went 8–5 with a 3.64 ERA and one save in 24 games (22 starts). With his fifth straight postseason entry, the Yankees faced the Anaheim Angels in the 2002 ALDS, but lost the series.

=== Montreal Expos ===
On January 15, 2003, Hernández was traded by the Yankees to the Montreal Expos in a three-team deal that involved the Chicago White Sox. He never appeared in a game for the Expos, missing the entire season due to a rotator cuff injury in his throwing shoulder that required surgery.

=== Second stint with Yankees ===
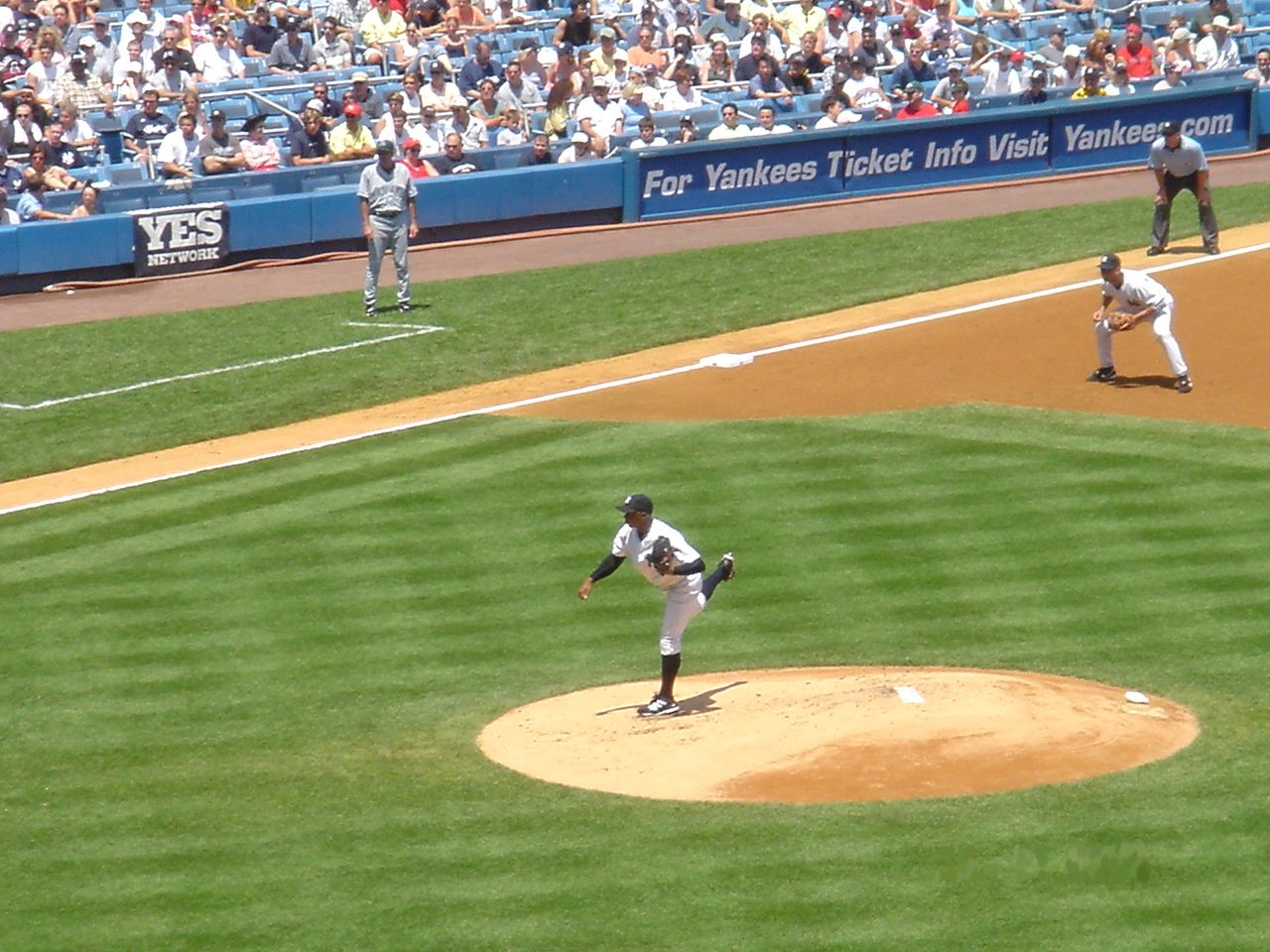
Hernández pitching for the Yankees in 2004.

Hernández signed a one-year contract to return to the New York Yankees on March 11, 2004. He missed the start of the 2004 season while recovering from his rotator cuff surgery. He started 15 games, going 8–2 with a 3.30 ERA. The Yankees reached the postseason once again, but they lost to the eventual World Series champion Boston Red Sox in the 2004 ALCS.

=== Chicago White Sox ===
In 2005, while pitching for the Chicago White Sox, Hernández went 9–9 with a 5.12 ERA and one save in 24 appearances (22 starts). He delivered a memorable performance in the sixth inning of Game 3 of the 2005 ALDS against the Red Sox. Brought on in relief with the bases loaded and no outs, Hernández induced two infield pop outs before striking out Johnny Damon without surrendering a run. The White Sox would go on to win the game, sweeping the Red Sox out of the playoffs. The White Sox reached the World Series and swept the Houston Astros to seal their first championship since 1917.

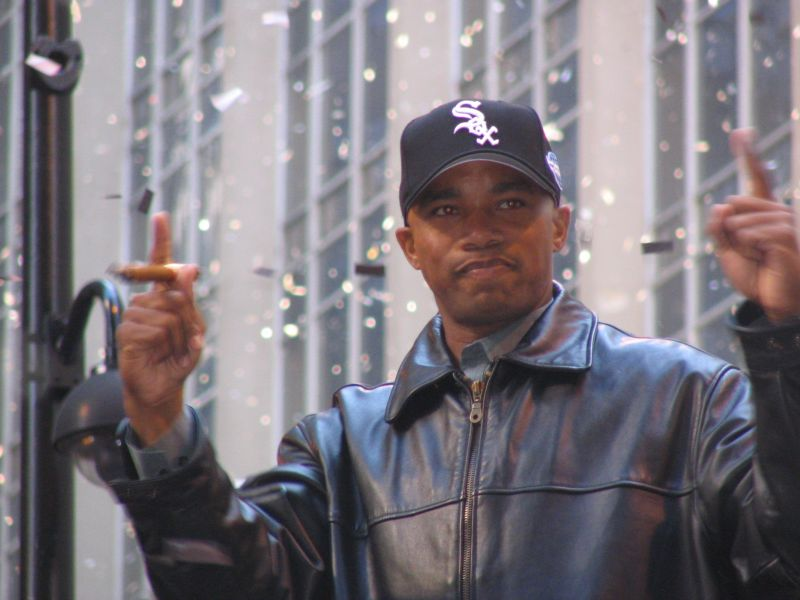
Hernández with the White Sox in 2005

=== Arizona Diamondbacks ===
After the 2005 season, Hernández was traded—along with relief pitcher Luis Vizcaíno and highly touted prospect outfielder Chris Young—to the Arizona Diamondbacks for former teammate Javier Vázquez. In nine starts, Hernández went 2–4 with a 6.11 ERA.

=== New York Mets ===
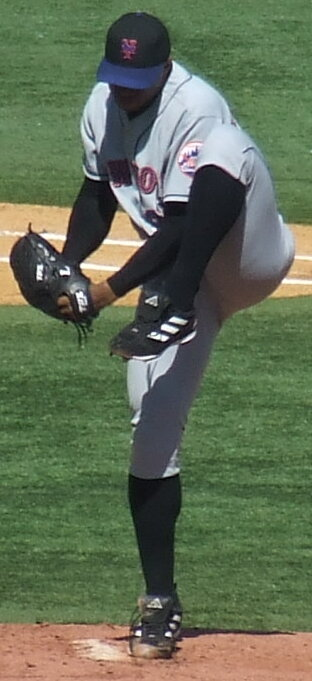
Hernández in 2006, demonstrating his distinctive leg kick

On May 24, 2006, he was dealt to the New York Mets in exchange for relief pitcher Jorge Julio. Hernández's debut season in the National League allowed him to attain some offensive feats for the first time in his career. On July 29, 2006, Hernández drove in the first two RBIs of his career. When asked when was the last time he remembered he drove in a run, Orlando said, "In Cuba." Then, on August 20, 2006, at Shea Stadium, Hernández had the first stolen base of his career.

After his trade to the Mets, Hernández went 9–7 with a 4.09 ERA in 20 starts as the Mets won the National League East. His pitching in September, going 2–2 with a 2.01 ERA, led to him being named the Mets' Game One starter in the 2006 National League Division Series. However, while running sprints in the outfield the day before the playoffs started, Hernández tore a muscle in his calf and had to be scratched from the postseason roster. He was re-signed by the Mets on November 14, 2006. Injuries limited Hernández to just 24 starts during the 2007 season, but he pitched successfully when healthy, posting a 9–5 record, a 3.72 ERA and 128 strikeouts in 147 innings. Hernández underwent foot surgery following the 2007 season and was not ready to begin the 2008 season with the Mets. He underwent a lengthy post-surgery rehabilitation program in Florida with the intent of joining the Mets in August 2008. A toe injury that required season-ending surgery in late August 2008 ended Hernández's season without him throwing a pitch for the Mets. He became a free agent at the end of the year.

=== Texas Rangers organization ===
On June 11, 2009, Hernández signed a minor league deal with the Texas Rangers. He was assigned to Triple-A Oklahoma. The Rangers informed him that they would not call him up to the major leagues because they did not believe he had the velocity or command to pitch there. Hernández was released on July 17, 2009. At the time of his release, his record with the Triple-A RedHawks was 2–0 in eight relief appearances.

=== Washington Nationals organization ===
On July 2, 2010, Hernández signed a minor league deal with the Washington Nationals, attempting a comeback. He went 2–1 with a 1.72 ERA with 21 strikeouts in 15 2/3 innings for the Rookie League Gulf Coast Nationals and the Double-A Harrisburg Senators in the Washington Nationals organization. General Manager Mike Rizzo informed Hernández that he would not receive a September call-up, and Hernández left the organization.

=== Retirement ===
Hernández officially retired from Major League Baseball on August 18, 2011. He broadcast the 2017 World Series for ESPN Deportes Radio.

== Disputed birth year ==
When Hernández signed with the Yankees in 1998, he claimed to have been born in 1969. In 1999, The Smoking Gun published his divorce decree from Cuba; the document, which had surfaced in connection with a child support case brought by his ex-wife, revealed him to have been born in 1965. The official site of Major League Baseball still gives his year of birth as 1969, while his pages on ESPN and Baseball-Reference.com list it as 1965.

== Other career highlights ==
Hernández is a two-time Cuban National Series Champion (1992 and 1996).

In June 2013, Hernández participated in the 67th annual Yankees Old-Timers' Day. It was his first appearance during Old-Timers' Day. He returned in 2014.

== See also ==
- List of baseball players who defected from Cuba
- List of baseball players who are Olympic gold medalists and World Series champions
- List of Major League Baseball players from Cuba
- List of Olympic medalists in baseball
- List of World Series starting pitchers
