= Javier Méndez (baseball) =

Cuban baseball player

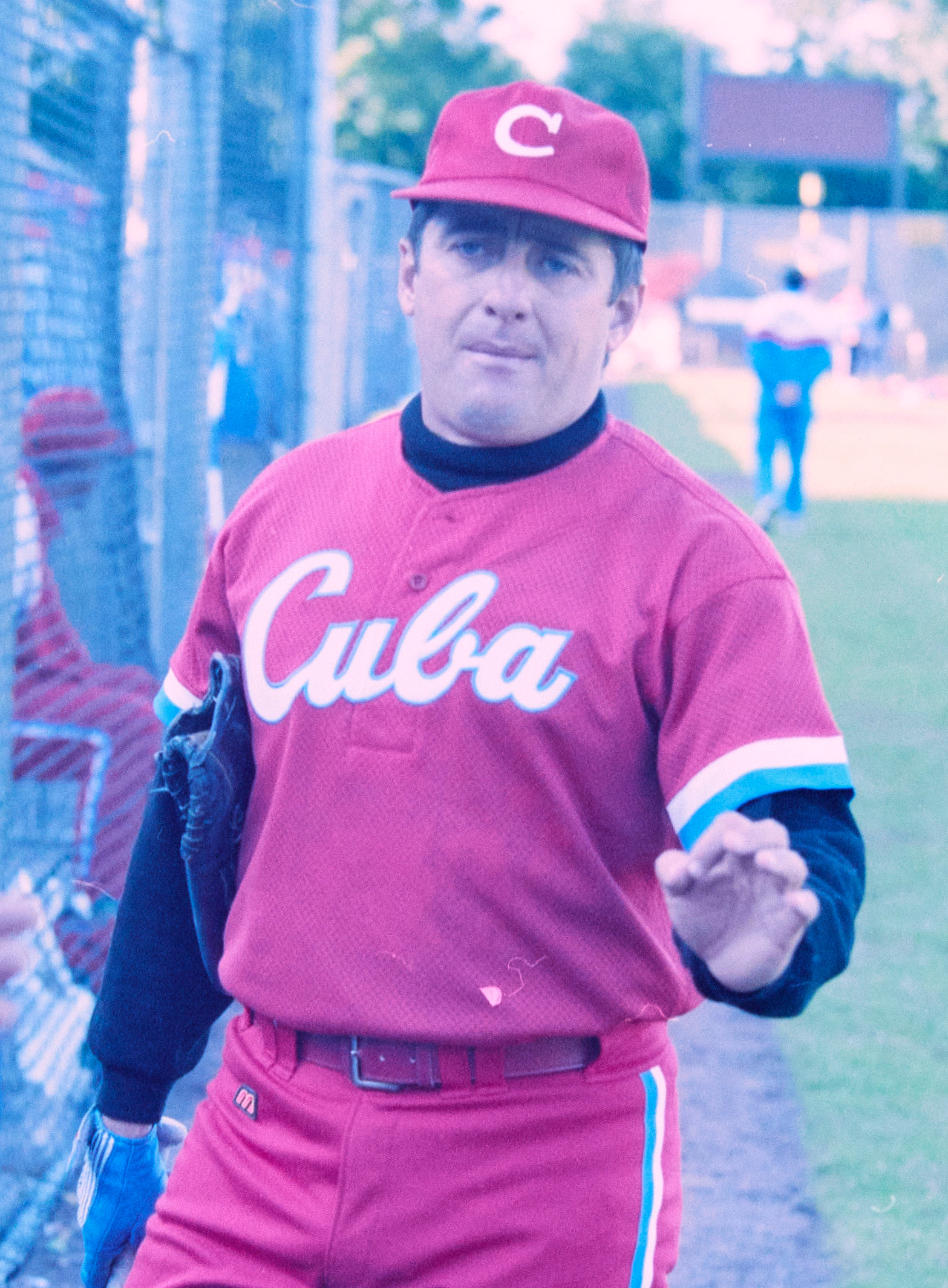
- Méndez in 1998
- Outfielder
- Born: 22 April 1964 (age 62); Santa Fe, Havana, Cuba
- Bats: Left Throws: Left
Medals
Men's baseball
Representing Cuba
Olympic Games
Silver medal – second place	2000 Sydney	Team
Baseball World Cup
Gold medal – first place	1990 Edmonton	Team
Gold medal – first place	1998 Rome	Team
Pan American Games
Gold medal – first place	1999 Winnipeg	Team
Gold medal – first place	2003 Santo Domingo	Team
Central American and Caribbean Games
Gold medal – first place	1990 Mexico City	Team
Gold medal – first place	1998 Maracaibo	Team
Goodwill Games
Gold medal – first place	1990 Seattle	Team

Javier Méndez González (born 22 April 1964) is a Cuban former baseball player and manager. He played 22 seasons in the Cuban National Series, mostly with Industriales, and was also a longtime member of the Cuba national baseball team, with which he became an Olympic silver medalist. His play as a centerfielder earned him the nickname "El Seguro".

== Career ==
Méndez debuted in the National Series with Metropolitanos in the 1981–82 season. Four seasons later, in 1985, he moved to Industriales. Hitting third, he finished the year batting .357 and won his first championship with Industriales that year. The following year, Méndez earned the batting title, hitting .408, and was awarded the Most Valuable Player Award. Méndez won three more championships with Industriales, in 1992, 1996 and 2003. In 2003, his final season, Méndez set a league record of 92 runs batted in (a record later surpassed by Alexeis Bell in 2008, with 111) and earned his second MVP award.

Cuban National Series career statistics
Seasons	AB	R	H	2B	3B	HR	RBI	BA	OBP	SLG
22	6432	1139	2104	381	41	191	1175	.327	.440	.488

== Managerial career ==
Méndez managed Industriales for two seasons, from 2015 to 2017, before resigning due to family health concerns.
