= Guillermo Carmona (baseball) =

Cuban baseball manager

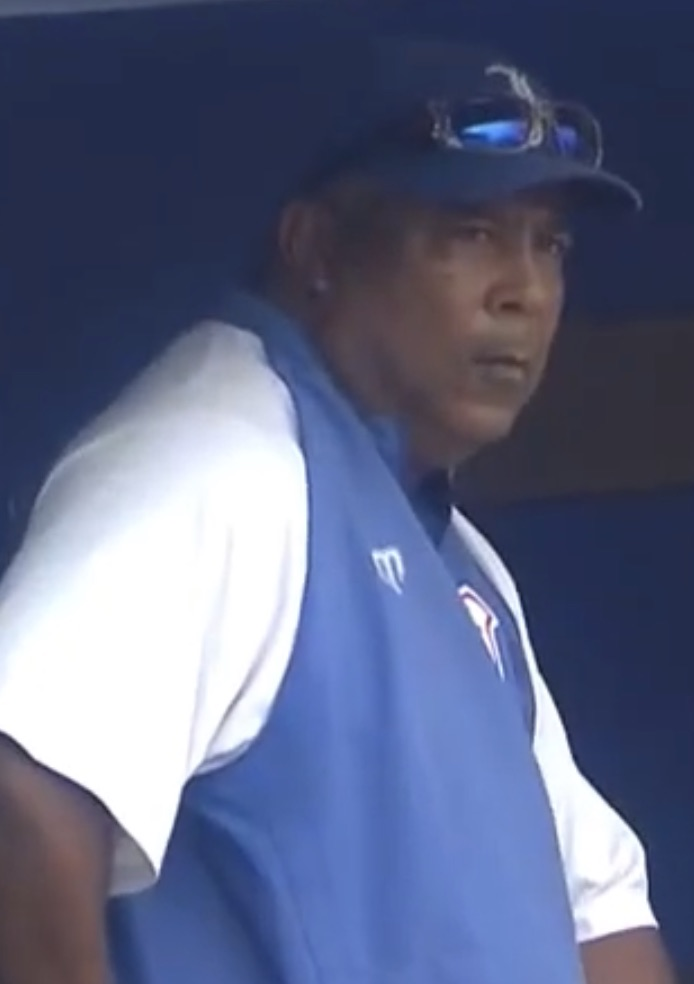
- Carmona in 2022

Industriales – No. 93
- Manager
- Born: 27 August 1961 (age 64); Havana, Cuba

Guillermo Rolando Carmona Casanova (born 27 August 1961) is a Cuban baseball manager who is the current manager of Industriales in the Cuban National Series.

Carmona got his start as manager of Metropolitanos, Havana's second team, in the 1994–95 Cuban National Series. He was the first manager of the team to qualify for a postseason berth in 1998. The following season, he became the manager of crosstown rival Industrials as a replacement for Pedro Medina; he would manage the team for three seasons between 1998 and 2001, achieving a third-place finish and losing in the 1999 final series to loss to rivals Santiago de Cuba. Carmona's first tenure with Industriales included players such as Lázaro Vargas, Germán Mesa, Juan Padilla, and Javier Mendez. In the 2000-2001 season, his last as manager, Industriales finished in eighth place.

He spent several years coaching in the Italian Baseball League, taking the reins of Novara in the 2009 season. He returned to Cuba in 2017 and was approached to return to the helm of Industriales after the departure of manager Javier Méndez due to personal issues; however, he was ultimately passed over for the position in favor of Víctor Mesa. Carmona returned to manage Industriales in the 2020 season.

After Carmona led Industriales to a title in the summer-time Cuban Elite League, he was named the head coach of the Cuba national under-23 baseball team set to play at the U-23 Baseball World Cup.
