= 2009–10 Cuban National Series =

The 49th Cuban National Series was won by Industriales over Villa Clara. Sancti Spíritus, who had the best regular season record, lost in the first round. Defending champion La Habana were eliminated in the semifinals.

== Regular season standings ==
=== West ===
Team	W	L	T	PCT.	GB
Sancti Spíritus	63	27	0	.700	-
Cienfuegos	51	39	0	.567	12
La Habana	49	40	0	.551	13½
Industriales	47	43	0	.522	16
Pinar del Río	46	43	1	.517	16½
Matanzas	33	57	0	.367	30
Isla de la Juventud	26	64	0	.289	37
Metropolitanos	22	68	0	.244	41

=== East ===
Team	W	L	T	PCT.	GB
Villa Clara	56	32	1	.637	-
Guantánamo	52	37	0	.584	4½
Ciego de Ávila	49	40	0	.551	7½
Santiago de Cuba	48	41	0	.539	8½
Las Tunas	47	43	0	.522	10
Granma	45	43	1	.511	11
Holguín	45	44	0	.506	11½
Camagüey	35	53	1	.399	21

== Playoffs ==
Quarterfinals
W1	Sancti Spíritus	1
W4	Industriales	4
West
W2	Cienfuegos	1
W3	La Habana	4
E1	Villa Clara	4
E4	Santiago de Cuba	2
East
E2	Guantánamo	0
E3	Ciego de Ávila	4

Semifinals
W4	Industriales	4
W3	La Habana	2
E1	Villa Clara	4
E3	Ciego de Ávila	1

Final
W4	Industriales	4
E1	Villa Clara	3
