= Core Four =

Group of New York Yankees players from the 1990s through the 2010s

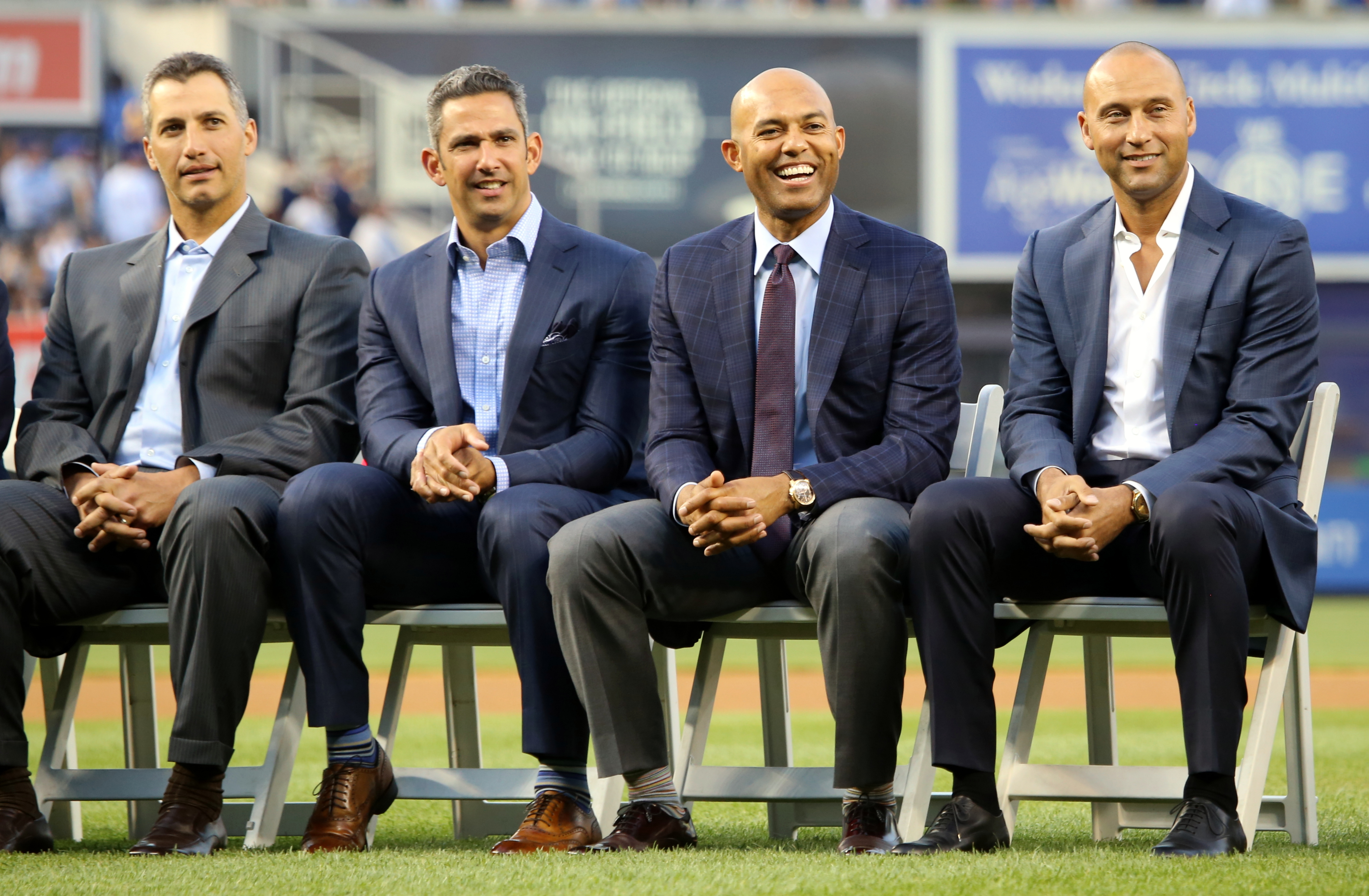
The Core Four in 2015. From left: Andy Pettitte, Jorge Posada, Mariano Rivera, and Derek Jeter.

The "Core Four" are former New York Yankees baseball players Derek Jeter, Andy Pettitte, Jorge Posada, and Mariano Rivera. Each member of the Core Four was a key contributor to the Yankees' late-1990s and early 2000s dynasty that won four World Series championships in five years, and a fifth in 2009.

Jeter, Pettitte, Posada, and Rivera were drafted or signed as amateurs by the Yankees in the early 1990s. They played together in the minor leagues and were all promoted to the major leagues in 1995. By 2007, they were the only remaining Yankees from the franchise's dynasty of the previous decade. All four players were on the Yankees' active roster in 2009 when the team won the 2009 World Series—its fifth championship in the previous 14 years. Three members of the Core Four—Jeter, Rivera and Posada—played together for 17 consecutive years (1995–2011), longer than any other similar group in the history of North American professional sports. Pettitte had a sojourn away from the team when he played for the Houston Astros for three seasons, but returned to the Yankees in 2007. He retired after the 2010 season, reducing the group to the so-called Key Three. Posada followed suit after 2011, ending his 17-year career with the Yankees. Pettitte came out of retirement prior to the 2012 season and played for two more years. Both Pettitte and Rivera retired after the 2013 season, and Jeter retired after the 2014 season.

The four members of the Core Four are now regarded as some of the greatest Yankees players of all time. All four were honored at Monument Park, while Jeter and Rivera were both inducted into the National Baseball Hall of Fame. Notably, Rivera is the only unanimous pick in the Hall of Fame's history, while Jeter fell one vote short of unanimous selection himself. Posada became eligible in 2017, but received only 3.8% of the vote and was dropped off of the ballot, although he may still be inducted by the Veterans Committee. Pettitte is currently still on the ballot, but has only accumulated 48.5% of the vote (opposed to the necessary 75% needed for induction) as of the 2026 ballot, his eighth ballot.

== Beginnings ==
Derek Jeter, Mariano Rivera, Jorge Posada, and Andy Pettitte all joined the New York Yankees organization in the early 1990s as amateurs. Rivera signed as an international free agent in February 1990. The Yankees selected Pettitte in the 22nd round and Posada in the 24th round of the 1990 Major League Baseball draft. Jeter was selected in the first round, with the sixth overall selection, of the 1992 Major League Baseball draft.

Together, the Core Four progressed through the Yankees minor league system in the early 1990s. It was during their tenure with the Oneonta Yankees of the Class A-Short Season New York-Penn League in 1991 that Posada, initially an infielder, began catching for his future major league batterymate Pettitte. The latter threw a knuckleball at the time, which Posada struggled to catch (hitting him mostly on the knee), prompting Pettitte to abandon the pitch. Promoted to the Greensboro Hornets of the Class A South Atlantic League in 1992, Posada and Pettitte met Jeter, a highly regarded prospect, who had been assigned to the team. Posada and Pettitte initially questioned the hype surrounding Jeter, but soon recognized his talent and poise. Rivera injured his elbow in 1992 and had surgery in August to repair the damage. While Rivera was pitching for Greensboro in 1993 on a strict pitch count, Jeter kept track of the count from shortstop.

The four first played together with the Class AAA Columbus Clippers of the International League in 1994. All four made their major league debuts in 1995. Both Jeter and Rivera reached the major leagues in May, but were demoted back to the minors in June and bounced around between the minors and major leagues throughout the year. Posada made his major league debut in September, and along with Pettitte and Rivera, was included on the Division Series roster.

Jeter, Posada, and Rivera played in the same MLB game for the first time on September 28, 1996. That season, Jeter, Pettitte and Rivera won their first championship together (Posada was left off that year's postseason roster).

== Individual achievements ==
=== Derek Jeter ===
Jeter became the Yankees all-time hits leader on September 11, 2009, with his 2,722nd hit, surpassing Lou Gehrig. On July 9, 2011, against the Tampa Bay Rays, he collected his 3,000th hit, becoming the 28th player to reach the milestone. Derek Jeter was the first Yankee to accomplish the feat and collect all 3,000 hits with the team, the first player to reach the milestone with a New York team, the fourth-youngest player to reach the mark, the second to do it by hitting a home run, the second to reach the mark in a five-hit game, and the first to attain the milestone playing shortstop exclusively. Furthermore, Jeter broke Rickey Henderson's franchise record for stolen bases on May 28, 2011, when he stole his 327th base against the Mariners. Jeter's third milestone in 2011 was breaking Mickey Mantle's record for most games played as a Yankee, accomplishing this on August 28, 2011 against the Orioles. In 2000, he became the only player to win both the World Series Most Valuable Player (MVP) Award and the All-Star Game MVP in the same season. His #2 was retired on May 14, 2017.

=== Andy Pettitte ===
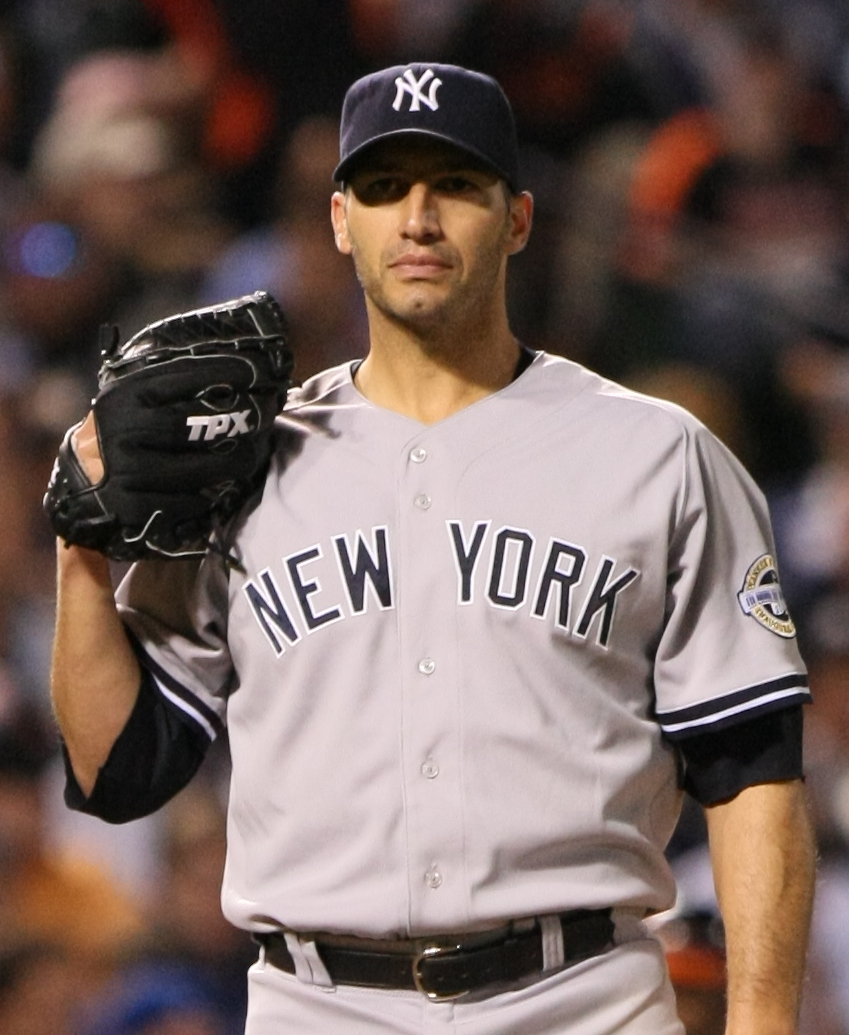
Andy Pettitte became the first of the Core Four to retire in 2011, but unretired in 2012.

Pettitte holds the all-time record for postseason victories, with 19 wins in total. Among Yankees pitchers, he ranks first in strikeouts (2,011) and third in wins (213). He was named the 2001 American League Championship Series Most Valuable Player and won the Warren Spahn Award in 2003 as the best left-handed pitcher in baseball. His #46 was retired on 23 August 2015.

=== Jorge Posada ===
Posada is only the fifth major league catcher with at least 1,500 hits, 350 doubles, 275 home runs, and 1,000 runs batted in (RBIs) in a career, and the only major league catcher to ever record a .330 batting average or better with 40 doubles, 20 home runs, and 90 RBIs in a single season. He is only the second Yankees catcher to hit 30 home runs in a season, after Yogi Berra. Among Yankee catchers, Posada is first all-time in doubles (365), walks (897), and intentional walks (74), and second in home runs (261) and extra-base hits (636). Among all Yankees players, Posada ranks sixth all-time in grand slams (10). On April 16, 2009, Posada hit the first home run at the new Yankee Stadium. His #20 was retired on August 22, 2015.

=== Mariano Rivera ===
Rivera played 19 seasons with the Yankees (1995–2013), serving as closer for 17 of them. He retired as MLB's career leader in saves (652) and games finished (952), having surpassed Trevor Hoffman in both categories in 2011. Rivera's career earned run average (ERA) (2.21) and WHIP (1.00) are the lowest of any pitcher in the live-ball era. In the postseason, he holds the MLB record for career saves (42) and ERA (0.71). He also holds records for 15 consecutive seasons with 25 or more saves, nine consecutive seasons with 30 or more saves, and 15 seasons with 30 or more saves. From 1996 through his final season in 2013, he posted an ERA under 3.00 in all but one season (2007). Selected as an All-Star 13 times, he saved a record four All-Star Games, the last coming in 2009. On May 25, 2011, he became the 15th pitcher in major league history to make 1,000 appearances, and the first to do so with a single team. His appearances total ranks as the most in American League history. On September 22, 2013, Rivera became the first active Yankee player to have his number retired by the organization; he was the last major league player to wear number 42 full-time, following its league-wide retirement in honor of Jackie Robinson.

He was elected to the Baseball Hall of Fame on January 22, 2019 with 100% of the vote, becoming the first player ever to be elected unanimously.

== Group achievements ==
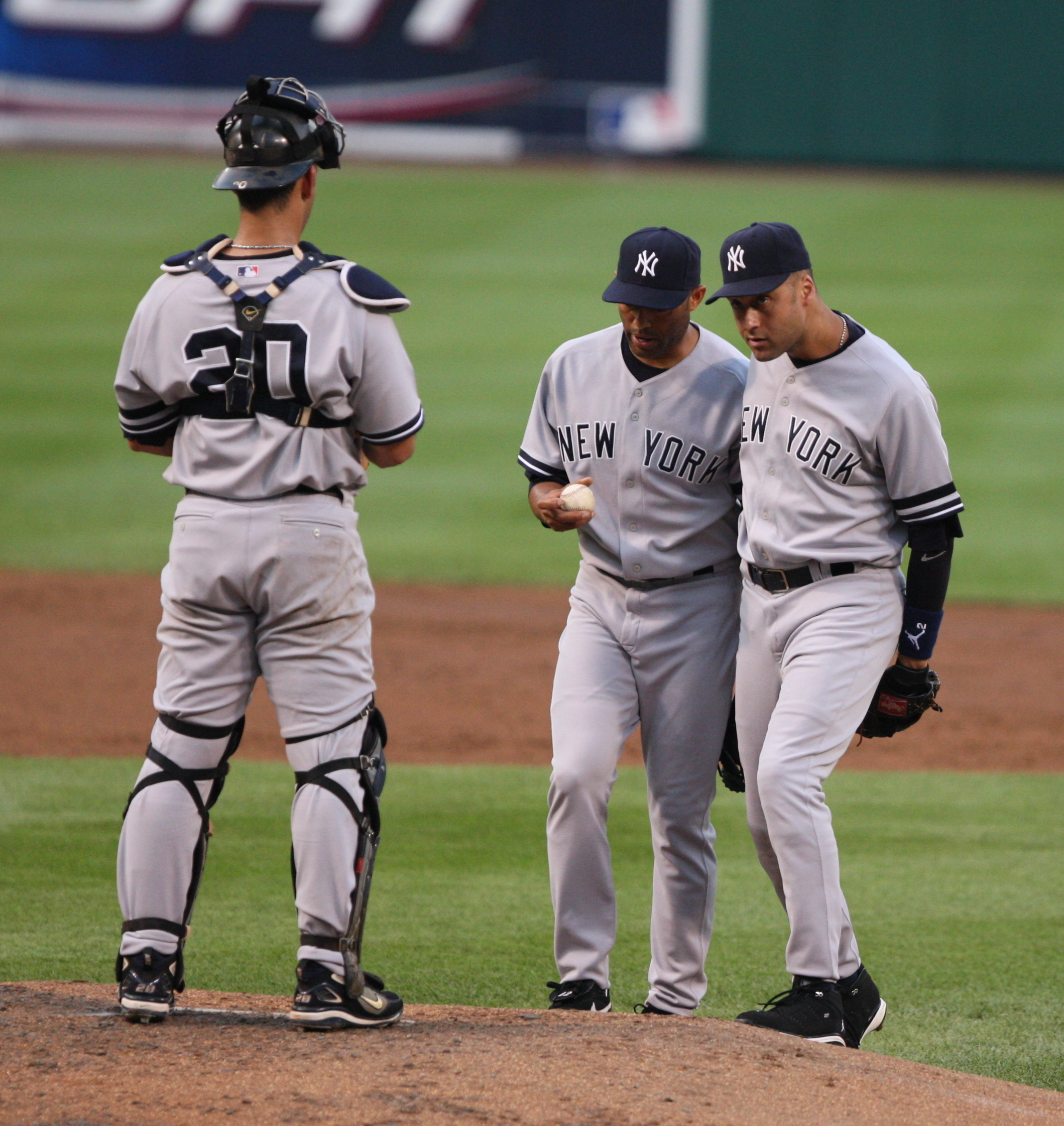
Three members of the Core Four – Posada (left), Rivera (middle), and Jeter (right) – played together for 17 consecutive years from 1995 to 2011, the longest in North American professional sports.

The Core Four won four World Series Championships together in five years. They won seven American League pennants together from 1996 to 2009.

Pettitte and Rivera hold the all-time record for most win–save combinations with 72; Bob Welch and Dennis Eckersley previously held the record with 58.

In 2010, Rivera, Jeter, and Posada became the first trio in any of the four North American major sports leagues to play together on the same team for 16 consecutive seasons. Posada and Jeter played their 1,660th game together on July 14, 2011. This broke the record for most regular-season games played together by two Yankee teammates, previously held by Lou Gehrig and Tony Lazzeri.

With the rise of free agency and trades, many sportswriters believe that it is highly unlikely that another group of players of comparable size will spend their entire careers with a single team. Buck Showalter, the Yankees manager during the Core Four's major league debuts in 1995, said, "[Y]ou won't see anything like this happen again. There are too many variables for that to ever happen again. And what you have to remember is the makeup of those guys. The common thread was their agenda. They didn't branch off. They didn't want to disappoint each other. They were guys who never wanted to let their teammates down."

== Endings ==
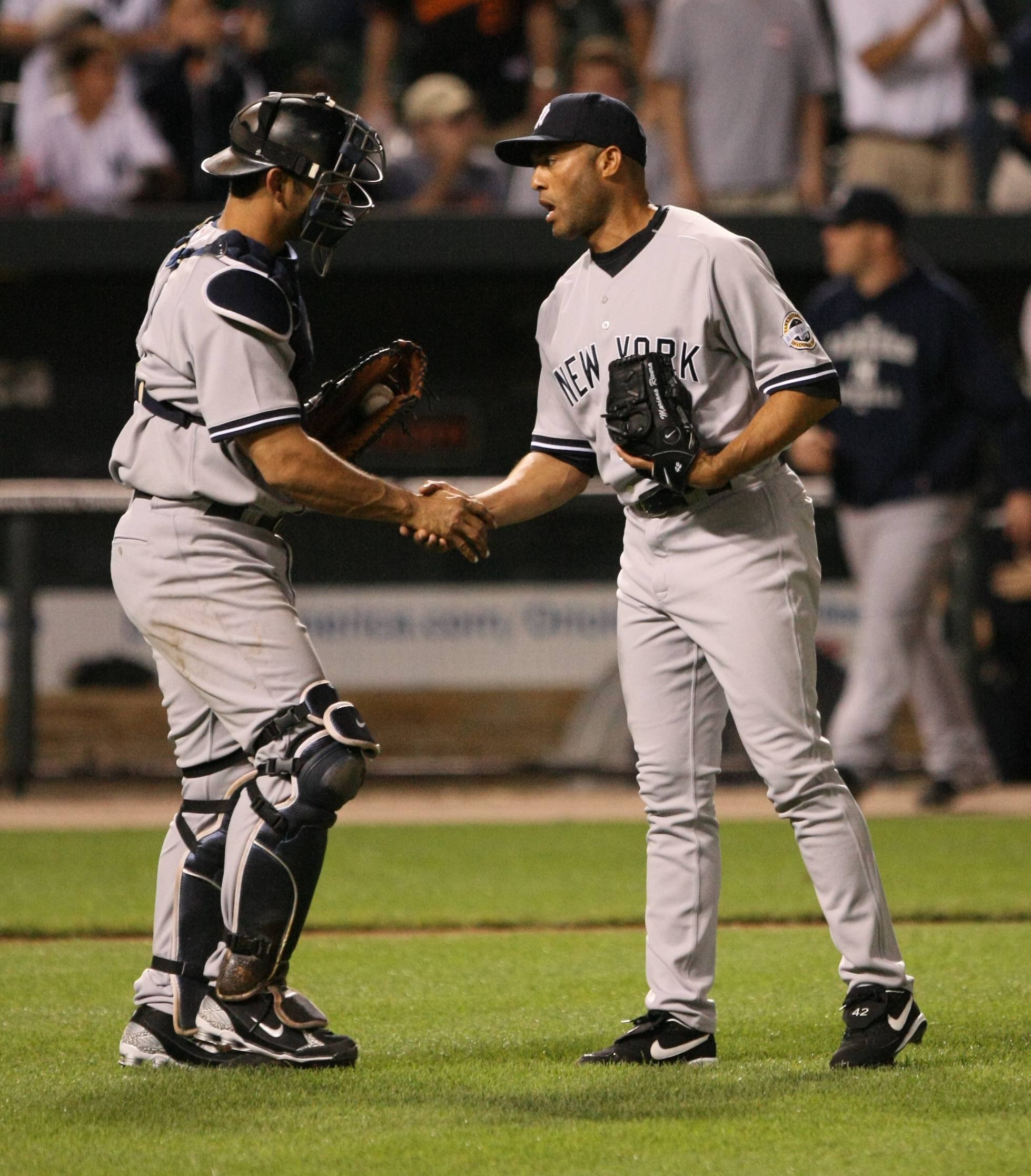
Posada (left) and Rivera (right) shaking hands after the end of a game in 2009.

Pettitte was the first player of the Core Four to retire, announcing his decision at a news conference at Yankee Stadium on February 4, 2011. He told the organization "not to count on his return" after the Yankees lost the 2010 American League Championship Series to the Texas Rangers, citing his desire to spend more time with his family. After spending the 2011 season away from baseball, he served as a guest instructor for the Yankees during 2012 spring training and insisted that he was not considering a comeback. However, he reversed his decision on his final day as instructor and rejoined the organization on March 16, signing a $2.5 million minor league contract. He pitched in both the 2012 and 2013 seasons for the Yankees before announcing his second retirement on September 20, 2013. Although he was initially not going to reveal his decision, it was at Rivera's insistence that he eventually did. The Yankees held a ceremony for Pettitte five days later on September 25, with fellow Core Four members Jeter and Rivera presenting him with a framed base from his final Yankee Stadium start, signed by all his teammates. He made his final appearance on September 28 against the Houston Astros, the only other team he had pitched for in his career. He pitched a complete game—his first since 2006—and by winning his last start, he finished the season with an 11–11 win–loss record. This preserved his records of never having a losing season throughout his 18-year career and being the only pitcher in major league history to have 15 winning seasons (with a minimum of three starts each) without recording a losing season.

The second member of the group to retire was Posada. He endured a tumultuous 2011 season that saw him lose the starting catcher job to Russell Martin, drop to 9th in the Yankee lineup after batting .165, bench himself, and then lose his spot in the lineup as the starting designated hitter altogether. Posada had several memorable performances at the end of the year. He drove in the go-ahead runs that clinched the American League East title for the Yankees and batted .429 in the 2011 American League Division Series against the Detroit Tigers. After the Yankees lost the series in Game 5, he cut short a postgame interview when he teared up, coming to the realization that it could have been his final game as a Yankee. He announced his decision to retire on January 24, 2012.

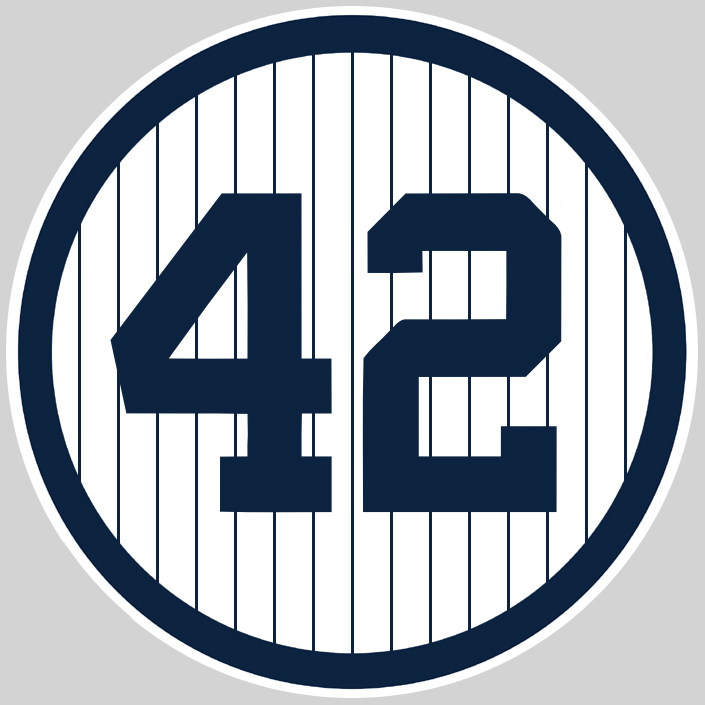
The Yankees retired Rivera's uniform number on September 22, 2013, making him the first active Yankee player to be honored in this way.

Rivera had hinted during 2012 spring training that the 2012 season would be his last, and confirmed that his decision was "irrevocable." He intended to reveal his decision at the end of the year, preferring a low-key departure instead of having a farewell tour across MLB stadiums. However, he reversed his decision after tearing his anterior cruciate ligament (ACL) and part of his meniscus while shagging fly balls on May 3, 2012. This prematurely ended his season, and though there were fears that this could potentially be a career-ending injury, he stated that he would return, declaring that he was "not going down like this."

After rehabilitating his injury through the offseason, Rivera announced on March 9 that he would retire at the end of the 2013 season. His farewell tour saw him meet the fans and unsung employees of opposing teams during his final visit to their ballparks to listen to their stories and thank them for supporting baseball. Each opposing team reciprocated the gesture by holding an on-field ceremony and honoring him with a parting gift. On September 22, a day that was declared "Mariano Rivera Day" by the Mayor of New York City Michael Bloomberg, the Yankees held their own ceremony to honor Rivera, culminating in the retiring of his uniform number into Monument Park. Many former teammates of his were in attendance, including Posada, who threw out the ceremonial first pitch to Rivera in a reversal of roles.

Jeter was the last player of the Core Four to retire, having announced on February 12, 2014 that he would retire at the end of the 2014 season.

== Career statistics with Yankees ==
External image
- The Core Four on the Cover of Sports Illustrated 6 Months After The Yankees' 2009 World Series Victory

=== Position players ===
Batting statistics
	Derek Jeter	Jorge Posada	Record note
Primary position	Shortstop	Catcher (Note: Posada also played 42 games at first base and 1 game at second during his career.)	
Games played	2,747 (1st)	1,829 (8th)	Jeter holds Yankee record
At bats	12,602 (1st)	6,092	Jeter holds Yankee record
Runs scored	1,923 (3rd)	900	
Hits	3,465 (1st)	1,664	Jeter holds Yankee record
Home runs	260 (9th)	275 (8th)	
Runs batted in	1,311 (6th)	1,065	
Batting average	.310 (7th)	.273	
Stolen bases	358 (1st)	20	Jeter holds Yankee record
Hall of Fame	Elected		

(nth) indicates rank within the top 10 among Yankee all-time leaders as of September 29, 2014

=== Pitchers ===
Pitching statistics
	Andy Pettitte	Mariano Rivera	Record note
Primary position	Starting pitcher	Relief pitcher (Note: Rivera also started 10 games (all during his 1995 rookie season).)	
Games pitched	447 (5th)	1,115 (1st)	Rivera holds AL record
Innings pitched	2,796 1/3 (3rd)	1,283 2/3	
Wins	219 (3rd)	82	
Losses	127 (3rd)	60	
Saves	0	652 (1st)	Rivera holds MLB record
Earned run average (Note: Minimum of 500 innings pitched for the Yankees.)	3.94	2.21 (2nd)	
Strikeouts	2,020 (1st)	1,173 (8th)	Pettitte holds Yankee record
Walks	889 (4th)	286	
Hall of Fame		Elected	Rivera holds election percentage record (100%)

(nth) indicates rank within the top 10 among Yankee all-time leaders as of September 29, 2014

== See also ==
- Murderers' Row
- M&M Boys
