= M&M Boys =

Baseball player duo Mickey Mantle and Roger Maris

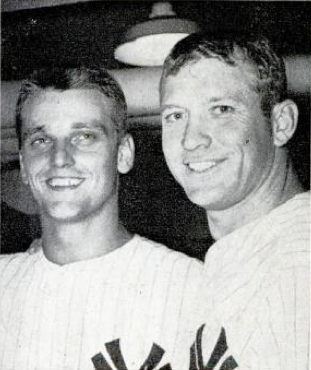
Roger Maris (left) and Mickey Mantle (right) in 1961

The "M&M Boys" were the duo of New York Yankees baseball players Mickey Mantle and Roger Maris, who were teammates from 1960 to 1966. (Note: These years marked Maris' tenure with the New York Yankees. On the other hand, Mantle played his entire career with the Yankees.) They gained prominence during the 1961 season, when Maris and Mantle, batting third and cleanup (fourth) in the Yankee lineup respectively, both challenged Babe Ruth's 34-year-old single-season record of 60 home runs. The home run lead would change hands between the two teammates numerous times throughout the summer and fueled intense scrutiny of the players by the press. Maris eventually broke the record when he hit his 61st home run on the final day of the season, while Mantle hit 54 before he was forced to pull out of the lineup in September because of an abscessed hip.

Maris' record stood for 37 years until it was broken in 1998 by Mark McGwire, who later admitted to taking performance enhancing drugs during much of his career. Maris and Mantle still hold the single-season record for combined home runs by a pair of teammates, with 115.

== Beginnings ==
Mickey Mantle joined the Yankees in 1951. Roger Maris joined the Yankees, becoming Mickey Mantle's teammate in 1960, when the Kansas City Athletics traded Maris with Kent Hadley and Joe DeMaestri in exchange for Marv Throneberry, Norm Siebern, Hank Bauer, and Don Larsen. Mantle played center field, while Maris played right field.

During the 1960 season, Mantle led the American League (AL) with 40 home runs, while Maris finished with 39. Maris led the AL with 112 runs batted in (RBI) and a .581 slugging percentage. He also had a .283 batting average, the highest of his career, and won a Gold Glove Award. Maris won the 1960 AL Most Valuable Player (MVP) Award with 72% of the vote, while Mantle finished runner-up in the vote, placing just behind Maris with 71%.

== 1961 season ==
Near the beginning of the season, New York Yankees manager Ralph Houk decided to switch Mantle and Maris around in the batting order, having Maris bat third and Mantle cleanup instead of vice versa. This is cited as an advantage for Maris, as opposition pitchers were reluctant to pitch around him, as this would result in Mantle coming up to the plate to bat. As a result, pitchers gave Maris better pitches to hit for fear of walking him. At first, the batting order switch appeared to have little effect on Maris, who hit only one home run in April. However, he gained momentum in the home run race in May and June, slugging 11 and 15 home runs, respectively. On the other hand, Mantle started off the season strong, hitting 14 home runs by the end of May and 11 homers in June. At the end of June, it became clear that both M&M Boys were on pace to challenge Babe Ruth's 1927 single-season home run record. However, their chances of breaking Ruth's record were dealt a heavy blow on July 17, when Ford Frick, the Commissioner of Baseball, ruled that a player would have to hit more than 60 home runs in 154 games (Note: The 1927 season consisted of 154 games. With the addition of the Los Angeles Angels and the Washington Senators into the American League in 1961, the number of games in a season was expanded to 162 games in order to maintain a balanced schedule.) in order to break Ruth's record. Frick, who was a good friend of Ruth and served as his ghostwriter, added that a "distinctive mark" would have to be added should the record be broken after 154 games.

With the pressure intensifying over the newfound need to break the record within the time limit, Maris passed Mantle on August 15 for the final time that year and led the home run race for the rest of the season. Maris then became the first player in history to join the 50 home run club by the end of August. At the start of September, the race for the single-season record was still extremely close, with Maris having hit 56 home runs to Mantle's 53. However, Mantle was forced to pull out of the race after succumbing to an abscess in his hip joint caused from an injection that was supposed to cure him of a flu. Though most fans supported Mantle and vociferously rooted against Maris, it was the latter player who was now left to break Ruth's record alone.

Maris had a total of 58 home runs when the Yankees' played their 154th game of the season against the Baltimore Orioles. He homered just once in the game, falling two short of setting a new and recognized single-season home run record. Ironically, Maris hit his 60th home run in fewer plate appearances (684) than Babe Ruth (689). This made Frick's ruling nonsensical, since games played "matter less" than the number of opportunities presented to a batter. On October 1, the final day of the season, only 23,154 people were in attendance at Yankee Stadium to see Maris hit his 61st home run of the season against Tracy Stallard of the Boston Red Sox. Frick's ruling back in July, coupled with the Yankees' reluctance to highlight the event, are cited as reasons for the surprisingly low attendance.

== Aftermath ==
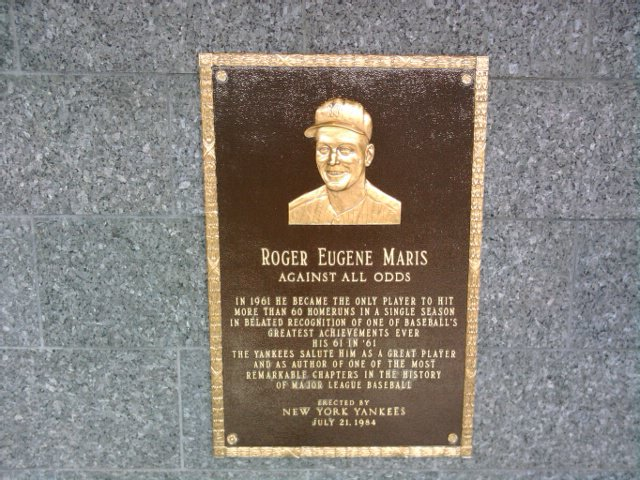
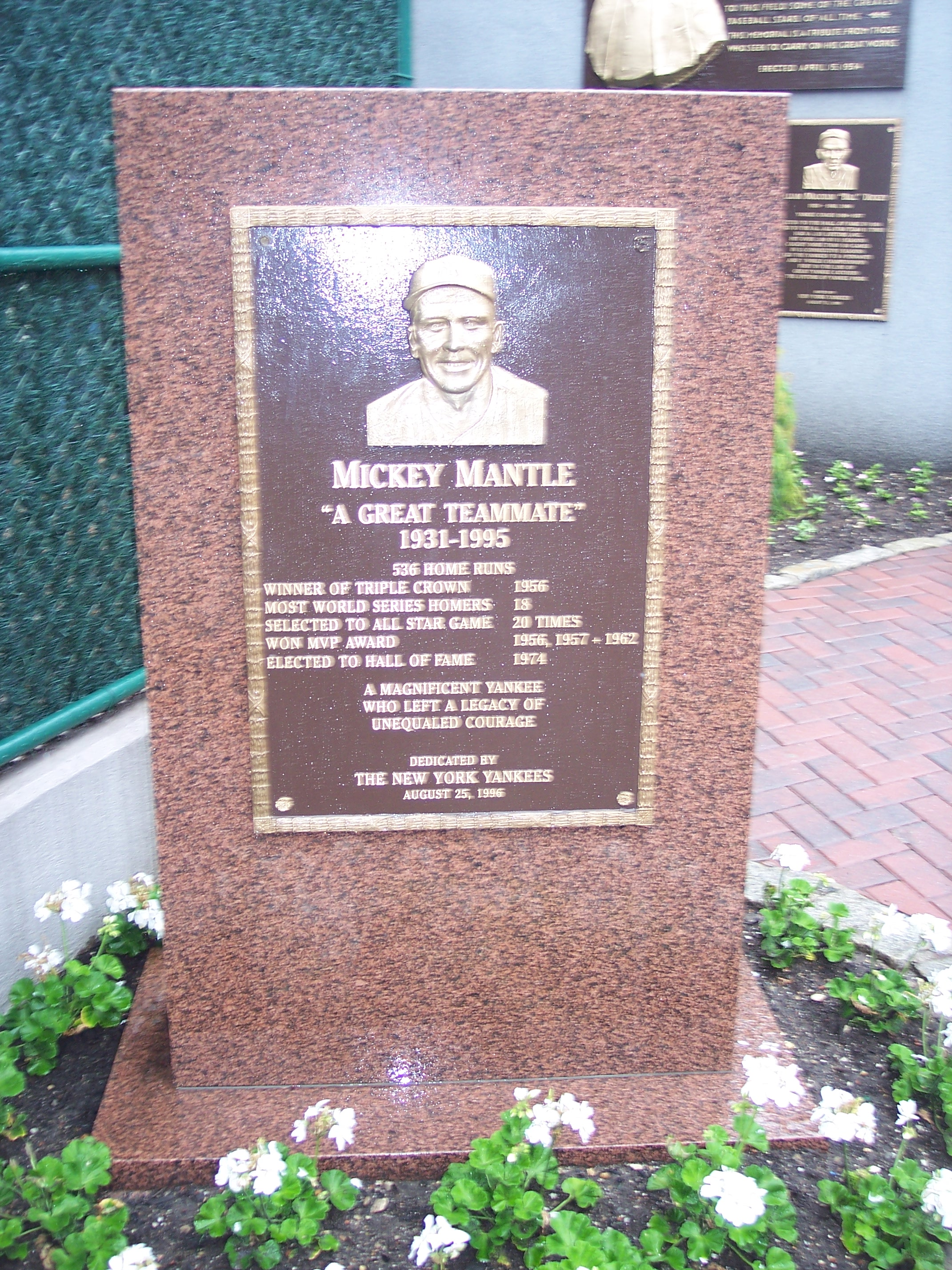
Roger Maris is honored with a plaque (left) in Monument Park, while Mickey Mantle's plaque was mounted onto a monument (right) upon his death in 1995.

Sal Durante, the man who caught Maris' 61st home run ball, offered to return it to Maris. Maris politely declined and even encouraged Durante to sell the memorabilia in order to earn some money. Durante sold the ball for $5,000 to a restaurateur, who gave the ball to Maris. Maris donated the ball to the National Baseball Hall of Fame and Museum in 1973.

Mantle returned from injury later that season, thus enabling both M&M Boys to participate in the 1961 World Series. Though Maris and Mantle's batting averages throughout the series were a mere .105 and .167, the Yankees were able to defeat the Cincinnati Reds, 4 games to 1. At the end of the season, Maris won the AL MVP Award for the second consecutive year. The voting points and percentage of votes for the M&M Boys were exactly the same as in 1960, with Maris garnering 202 points to Mantle's 198 points.

Mantle was elected to the Hall of Fame in 1974 on his first ballot appearance. On the other hand, Maris never met the 75% threshold required for induction into the Hall and was eliminated from future BBWAA voting in 1988, his 15th and final time on the ballot, where he garnered 43.1% of the vote (the highest vote percentage he received). Nevertheless, the Yankees honored both Mantle and Maris by retiring their numbers and presenting them with plaques that hang in Monument Park.

In 1991, thirty years after Maris hit 61 home runs, commissioner Fay Vincent ruled that there be only one single-season home run record and that any notation beside Maris' record (denoting that he hit 61 home runs in a 162-game season) be eliminated. Maris died six years earlier in 1985. Thus, he never knew the record was his.

== Group achievements ==
During their record-breaking season of 1961, the M&M Boys became the only teammates to join the 50 home run club in the same season, hitting a combined 115 home runs to break the single-season record for home runs by a pair of teammates. This record was previously held by Yankee sluggers Babe Ruth and Lou Gehrig, who hit 60 and 47 home runs, respectively, in 1927. In addition, Mantle and Maris combined to record 269 RBI.

== Relationship off the field ==
Contrary to popular belief, the M&M Boys were actually close friends and no hostility existed between the two of them. The two shared an apartment in Queens with fellow outfielder Bob Cerv during the 1961 season and when Mantle suffered an injury towards the end of the season, he openly rooted for Maris from his hospital bed in the latter's quest to break Ruth's single-season home run record. The stories of a feud developing between the M&M Boys during the 1961 season were inspired due to the media hype surrounding their quest to break Ruth's record.

Mantle and Maris engaged in a business partnership. The two endorsed Mantle–Maris wear, a line of clothing apparel for men and boys. They appeared in Safe at Home!, a movie released in April 1962.

== Legacy ==
The M&M Boys are viewed as one of the greatest offensive pair of teammates in the history of the game. Furthermore, the combined 115 home runs between the two during the 1961 season is considered a "bona fide untouchable" record. This is due to the fact that the likelihood of two teammates performing exceptionally well in a season is "surprisingly rare."

== 1961 statistics ==
	Roger Maris	Mickey Mantle	Leader
Position	Right fielder	Center fielder	
Position in the lineup	3	4	Maris up first
Games played	161	153	Maris
At-bats	590	514	Maris
Hits	159	163	Mantle
Home runs	61	54	Maris
Runs batted in	141	128	Maris, NYY record
Batting average	.269	.317	Mantle
On-base percentage	.372	.448	Mantle, NYY record
Slugging percentage	.620	.687	Mantle, NYY record
Baseball Hall of Fame	Not elected	Elected	Mantle

== Popular culture ==
The movie 61* was directed by avid Yankees fan Billy Crystal and released in 2001, the 40th anniversary of Maris' record-breaking season. It recounts both Mantle (portrayed by Thomas Jane) and Maris' (depicted by Barry Pepper) journey during the 1961 season in their quest to break Babe Ruth's single-season home run record of 60.

== Modern usage ==
Kevin McReynolds and Carmelo Martínez, starting outfielders for the 1984 San Diego Padres, were dubbed the "M&M Boys" after the Yankees duo. The Padres that season reached the World Series for the first time in the franchise's history, with McReynolds sharing the team lead with 20 home runs and Martinez adding 66 RBIs.

Historian Peter C. Bjarkman described Agustín Marquetti and Antonio Muñoz, who played in the Cuban National Series and with the Cuba national baseball team in the 1970s, as Cuba's version of the M&M Boys.

The usage of the nickname has resurfaced and has been utilized by broadcasters, analysts, and the print media to refer to the Minnesota Twins 3 and 4 hitting tandem of Joe Mauer and Justin Morneau, who won the American League MVP Award in 2009 and 2006, respectively. Mauer's batting prowess (uncharacteristic of a catcher) earned him three batting championships (2006, 2008 and 2009) and four Silver Slugger Awards (2006, 2008, 2009 and 2010), while his stellar defense enabled him to win three consecutive Gold Glove Awards from 2008 to 2010. This has been complemented with the power of Morneau, which has earned him a spot at the 2008 Home Run Derby (which he subsequently won) and runner-up in the 2008 American League MVP voting. The success of both Mauer and Morneau has begun to garner comparisons for the two teammates to the old Yankees tandem. However, Morneau has expressed some minor disdain for the term, feeling the comparison is being applied too soon.

Victor Martinez and J. D. Martinez starting for the 2014 Detroit Tigers were dubbed the "M&M Boys" by Tigers broadcaster Rod Allen.

== See also ==
- Murderers' Row
- Core Four
- Bash Brothers
