= 1976–77 Cuban National Series =

Baseball season in Cuba

1976–77 Cuban National Series Serie Nacional de Béisbol 1976–77
- League: Cuban National Series
- Sport: Baseball
- Number of games: 39
- Number of teams: 14

Regular season
- Champion: Citricultores (26–12)

SNB seasons
- ← 1975–76 1977–78 →

The 16th Cuban National Series was won by Citricultores, hailing from Matanzas Province. They finished with a slim lead over Vegueros from Pinar del Río Province. The length of schedule and the teams within the league again remained the same as the prior season.

== Standings ==
Team	W	L	Pct.	GB
Citricultores	26	12	.684	-
Vegueros	25	14	.641	1½
Metropolitanos	24	15	.615	2½
Ganaderos	23	16	.589	3½
Azucareros	23	16	.589	3½
Forestales	21	18	.538	5½
Agricultores	20	18	.526	6
Granjeros	20	19	.512	6½
Arroceros	20	19	.512	6½
Serranos	17	20	.459	8½
Henequeneros	14	23	.378	11½
Mineros	14	25	.358	12½
Constructores	12	27	.307	14½
Cafetaleros	11	28	.282	15½
