= Estéban Santa Cruz =

Cuban baseball player

- Outfielder
- Born: 1885; Cuba
- Bats: Unknown Throws: Unknown

Estéban Santa Cruz was a Cuban professional baseball outfielder in the Cuban League and Negro leagues. He played with several clubs from 1903 to 1910 including Almendares, Club Fé, Matanzas and the Cuban Stars (West). He was also known as Eugenio Santa Cruz.
