= 1995–96 Cuban National Series =

The 35th Cuban National Series was dominated by Villa Clara, seeking to match Industriales' record of four straight titles from the early 1960s. However, the Leones were able to defend their record by upending the Naranjas in the final.

== Standings ==
=== Group A ===
Team	W	L	Pct.	GB
Pinar del Río	41	23	.640	-
Matanzas	37	27	.578	4
Metropolitanos	32	32	.500	9
Isla de la Juventud	29	35	.453	12

=== Group B ===
Team	W	L	Pct.	GB
Industriales	41	22	.650	-
La Habana	37	27	.578	4½
Cienfuegos	28	37	.430	14
Sancti Spíritus	21	44	.323	21

=== Group C ===
Team	W	L	Pct.	GB
Villa Clara	48	17	.738	-
Camagüey	38	27	.584	10
Las Tunas	19	45	.296	28½
Ciego de Ávila	19	46	.292	29

=== Group D ===
Team	W	L	Pct.	GB
Santiago de Cuba	40	25	.615	-
Granma	33	32	.507	7
Holguín	30	35	.461	10
Guantánamo	23	42	.353	17

== Playoffs ==
Semifinals
A	Pinar del Río	0
B	Industriales	4
C	Villa Clara	4
D	Santiago de Cuba	2

Finals
B	Industriales	4
C	Villa Clara	2
