= 1972–73 Cuban National Series =

Baseball season in Cuba

1972–73 Cuban National Series Serie Nacional de Béisbol 1972–73
- League: Cuban National Series
- Sport: Baseball
- Number of games: 78
- Number of teams: 14

Regular season
- Champion: Industriales (53–25)

SNB seasons
- ← 1971–72 1973–74 →

The 12th season of the Cuban National Series saw Industriales win its fifth championship, outdistancing Habana and two-time defending champion Azucareros. The league expanded from 12 to 14 teams, with the addition of Constructores and Serranos, and increased the season length from 66 to 78 games.

== Standings ==
Team	W	L	Pct.	GB
Industriales	53	25	.679	-
Habana	50	28	.641	3
Azucareros	46	28	.621	5
Constructores	46	31	.597	6½
Camagüey	44	33	.571	8½
Oriente	42	35	.545	10½
Serranos	42	36	.538	11
Granjeros	40	38	.512	13
Vegueros	38	40	.487	15
Matanzas	34	44	.435	19
Mineros	32	45	.415	20½
Las Villas	32	46	.410	21
Pinar del Río	28	47	.373	23½
Henequeneros	13	64	.168	39½
