= 1991–92 Cuban National Series =

Baseball season in Cuba

1991–92 Cuban National Series Serie Nacional de Béisbol 1991–92
- League: Cuban National Series
- Sport: Baseball
- Duration: 29 October 1991 – 16 January 1992
- Games: 48
- Teams: 18

Eastern Zone
- Best record: Camagüey (29–19)

Western Zone
- Best record: Industriales (36–12)

Postseason
- Finals champions: Industriales
- Runners-up: Henequeneros

SNB seasons
- ← 1990–91 1992–93 →

The 31st season of the Cuban National Series again featured a four-team postseason bracket tournament, with the semifinal round increased to best-of-five series. Two-time defending champion Henequeneros of Matanzas Province advanced to the championship series, but lost to Industriales of Havana in five games. The league makeup of 18 teams, each with a 48-game schedule, was unchanged from recent seasons. This was the final time the league fielded 18 teams.

== Standings ==
=== Western Zone ===
Team	W	L	Pct.	GB
Industriales (Havana)	36	12	.750	-
Henequeneros (Matanzas)	31	17	.645	5
La Habana	31	17	.645	5
Vegueros (Pinar del Río)	30	18	.625	6
Metropolitanos (Havana)	28	20	.583	8
Cienfuegos	20	28	.416	16
Isla de la Juventud	16	32	.333	20
Forestales (Pinar del Río)	14	34	.291	22
Citricultores (Matanzas)	10	38	.208	26

=== Eastern Zone ===
Team	W	L	Pct.	GB
Camagüey	29	19	.604	-
Granma	28	20	.583	1
Holguín	27	21	.563	2
Las Tunas	26	21	.553	2.5
Santiago de Cuba	26	22	.541	3
Villa Clara	25	23	.520	4
Ciego de Ávila	21	26	.446	7.5
Guantánamo	18	30	.375	11
Sancti Spíritus	15	33	.300	14

== Playoffs ==
Semifinals
W1	Industriales	3
E2	Granma	0
E1	Camagüey	1
W2	Henequeneros	3

Finals
W1	Industriales	4
W2	Henequeneros	1

== League leaders ==
=== Western Zone ===
Batting leaders
Stat	Player	Team	Total
AVG	Omar Linares	Vegueros	.368
HR	Romelio Martínez	La Habana	19
RBI	Oscar Macías	La Habana	45
R	Luis Ignacio González	La Habana	52
H	Luis Ignacio González	La Habana	71
SB	José Estrada	Henequeneros	32

Pitching leaders
Stat	Player	Team	Total
W	Jorge Luis Valdés	Henequeneros	12
L	Justo López	Isla de la Juventud	9
ERA	Francisco Despaigne	Industriales	0.92
K	Faustino Corrales	Vegueros	100
IP	Carlos Yanes	Isla de la Juventud	103.1
SV	René Espín	Metropolitanos	6

=== Eastern Zone ===
Batting leaders
Stat	Player	Team	Total
AVG	José Lamarque	Holguín	.339
HR	Miguel Caldés	Camagüey	12
RBI	Luis Rodríguez	Holguín	41
R	Evenecer Godínez	Santiago de Cuba	35
H	Evenecer Godínez	Santiago de Cuba	62
SB	Víctor Mesa	Villa Clara	20

Pitching leaders
Stat	Player	Team	Total
W	Osvaldo Fernández	Holguín	10
L	Giorge Díaz	Guantánamo	8
L	Juan Carlos Beltrán	Guantánamo	8
ERA	Osvaldo Fernández	Holguín	1.19
K	Juan Carlos Pérez	Las Tunas	134
IP	Juan Carlos Pérez	Las Tunas	119.2
SV	Giorge Díaz	Guantánamo	3
SV	Felipe Fernández	Camagüey	3
SV	José Miguel Báez	Las Tunas	3
