= 1968–69 Cuban National Series =

Baseball season in Cuba

1968–69 Cuban National Series Serie Nacional de Béisbol 1968–69
- League: Cuban National Series
- Sport: Baseball
- Number of games: 99
- Number of teams: 12

Regular season
- Champion: Azucareros (69–30)

SNB seasons
- ← 1967–68 1969–70 →

The eighth Cuban National Series was won by Azucareros, with defending champion Habana and four-time champion Industriales finishing just a single game behind. The number of teams and length of schedule remained unchanged from the previous season.

== Standings ==
Team	W	L	Pct	GB
Azucareros	69	30	.697	-
Industriales	68	31	.687	1
Habana	68	31	.687	1
Mineros	62	37	.626	7
Granjeros	57	42	.576	12
Henequeneros	55	43	.556	13½
Las Villas	45	53	.455	23½
Pinar del Río	43	56	.434	26
Matanzas	35	64	.353	34
Oriente	33	66	.333	36
Vegueros	32	67	.323	37
Camagüey	26	73	.262	43
