= 2005–06 Cuban National Series =

The 45th season of the Cuban National Series ended with another title for Industriales. Though the Lions failed to win their division, they won close-fought series throughout the playoffs and won their 11th championship.

== Regular season standings ==
=== West ===
Group A
Team	W	L	PCT.	GB
Isla de la Juventud	54	35	.607	-
Pinar del Río	48	42	.533	6½
Matanzas	29	61	.322	25½
Metropolitanos	19	69	.216	34½

Group B
Team	W	L	PCT.	GB
Sancti Spíritus	58	32	.644	-
Industriales	56	34	.622	2
Havana Province	51	38	.573	6½
Cienfuegos	35	54	.393	22½

=== East ===
Group C
Team	W	L	PCT.	GB
Villa Clara	58	32	.644	-
Ciego de Ávila	53	37	.589	5
Las Tunas	47	43	.522	11
Camagüey	41	49	.456	17

Group D
Team	W	L	PCT.	GB
Santiago de Cuba	56	34	.622	-
Granma	51	38	.573	4½
Guantánamo	34	56	.378	22
Holguín	27	63	.300	29

== Playoffs ==
Quarterfinals
A1	Isla de la Juventud	2
B2	Industriales	3
West
B3	Havana Province	1
B1	Sancti Spíritus	3
C1	Villa Clara	2
D2	Granma	3
East
D1	Santiago de Cuba	3
C2	Ciego de Ávila	1

Semifinals
B2	Industriales	4
B1	Sancti Spíritus	3
D2	Granma	0
D1	Santiago de Cuba	4

Final
B2	Industriales	4
D1	Santiago de Cuba	2
