= 1967–68 Cuban National Series =

Baseball season in Cuba

1967–68 Cuban National Series Serie Nacional de Béisbol 1967–68
- League: Cuban National Series
- Sport: Baseball
- Number of games: 99
- Number of teams: 12

Regular season
- Champion: Habana (74–25)

SNB seasons
- ← 1966–67 1968–69 →

In the seventh season of the Cuban National Series, Habana won the title, outdistancing Industriales by five games. The season saw a significant expansion of the league, from six to 12 teams. Additionally, each team's schedule grew from 65 to 99 games.

== Standings ==
Team	W	L	Pct.	GB
Habana	74	25	.747	-
Industriales	69	30	.697	5
Azucareros	63	35	.643	10½
Mineros	61	38	.616	13
Las Villas	57	41	.582	16½
Henequeneros	52	47	.525	22
Granjeros	49	49	.500	24½
Oriente	48	51	.485	26
Camagüey	37	62	.374	37
Matanzas	36	63	.364	38
Vegueros	33	65	.337	40½
Pinar del Río	12	85	.124	61
