= 1966–67 Cuban National Series =

Baseball season in Cuba

1966–67 Cuban National Series Serie Nacional de Béisbol 1966–67
- League: Cuban National Series
- Sport: Baseball
- Number of games: 65
- Number of teams: 6

Regular season
- Champion: Orientales (36–29)

SNB seasons
- ← 1965–66 1967–68 →

In the sixth season of the Cuban National Series, Orientales dethroned four-time champion Industriales to win their only championship. Three other teams finished within three games of first place, while Las Villas and Granjeros both finished with losing records.

== Standings ==
| Team | W | L | Pct. | GB |
|---|---|---|---|---|
| Orientales | 36 | 29 | .554 | - |
| Industriales | 35 | 30 | .538 | 1 |
| Occidentales | 34 | 31 | .523 | 2 |
| Centrales | 33 | 32 | .508 | 3 |
| Las Villas | 30 | 35 | .462 | 6 |
| Granjeros | 27 | 38 | .415 | 9 |
