= 1971–72 Cuban National Series =

Baseball season in Cuba

1971–72 Cuban National Series Serie Nacional de Béisbol 1971–72
- League: Cuban National Series
- Sport: Baseball
- Number of games: 66
- Number of teams: 12

Regular season
- Best record: Azucareros & Mineros (52–14)

Tie-breaker
- Finals champions: Azucareros
- Runners-up: Mineros

SNB seasons
- ← 1970–71 1972–73 →

The 11th season of the Cuban National Series ended with a repeat champion, Azucareros. They defeated Mineros, two games to one, in a best-of-three tie-breaker after the teams tied for the best regular-season record. Mineros had a 25-game winning streak during the season, while Matanzas lost 25 in a row.

== Standings ==
Team	W	L	Pct.	GB
Azucareros	52	14	.787	-
Mineros	52	14	.787	-
Industriales	51	15	.772	1
Granjeros	49	17	.742	3
Henequeneros	40	26	.606	12
Habana	32	34	.484	20
Vegueros	29	37	.439	23
Oriente	24	42	.363	28
Camagüey	19	47	.287	33
Las Villas	18	48	.272	34
Pinar del Río	17	49	.257	35
Matanzas	13	53	.190	39

=== Tie-breaker ===
Azucareros defeated Mineros, 2–1 games
