= 2003–04 Cuban National Series =

The 43rd Cuban National Series ended with Industriales winning their record 10th title, sweeping Villa Clara in the best of seven final.

== Regular season standings ==
=== Western zone ===
Group A
| Team | W | L | PCT. | GB |
|---|---|---|---|---|
| Pinar del Río | 56 | 33 | .632 | -- |
| Isla de la Juventud | 47 | 43 | .500 | 9½ |
| Metropolitanos | 43 | 47 | .494 | 13½ |
| Matanzas | 27 | 62 | .299 | 29 |

Group B
| Team | W | L | PCT. | GB |
|---|---|---|---|---|
| Sancti Spíritus | 54 | 35 | .605 | -- |
| Industriales | 51 | 38 | .563 | 3 |
| La Habana | 38 | 51 | .442 | 16 |
| Cienfuegos | 27 | 62 | .302 | 27 |

=== Eastern zone ===
Group C
| Team | W | L | PCT. | GB |
|---|---|---|---|---|
| Villa Clara | 57 | 33 | .632 | -- |
| Ciego de Ávila | 55 | 34 | .628 | 1½ |
| Las Tunas | 44 | 46 | .471 | 13 |
| Camagüey | 38 | 52 | .437 | 19 |

Group D
| Team | W | L | PCT. | GB |
|---|---|---|---|---|
| Santiago de Cuba | 54 | 36 | .598 | -- |
| Granma | 48 | 41 | .540 | 5½ |
| Holguín | 42 | 47 | .471 | 8½ |
| Guantánamo | 34 | 55 | .384 | 19½ |

== Playoffs ==
Quarterfinals
A1 | Pinar del Río | 3
A2 | Isla de la Juventud | 0
West
B1 | Sancti Spíritus | 2
B2 | Industriales | 3
C1 | Villa Clara | 3
D2 | Granma | 0
East
D1 | Santiago de Cuba | 3
C2 | Ciego de Ávila | 0

Semifinals
A1 | Pinar del Río | 2
B2 | Industriales | 4
C1 | Villa Clara | 4
D1 | Santiago de Cuba | 3

Finals
B2 | Industriales | 4
C1 | Villa Clara | 0
