= 1962–63 Cuban National Series =

Baseball season in Cuba

1962–63 Cuban National Series Serie Nacional de Béisbol 1962–63
- League: Cuban National Series
- Sport: Baseball
- Number of games: 30
- Number of teams: 4

Regular season
- Best record: Industriales & Oriente (16–14)

Tie-breaker
- Finals champions: Industriales
- Runners-up: Oriente

SNB seasons
- ← 1961–62 1963–64 →

The second season of the Cuban National Series was a display of parity, as three of the four teams were within one game of .500. Tied at the top were Industriales and Oriente, so they played a best-of-three tie-breaker to decide the title, resulting in the first of many titles for Industriales.

== Standings ==
| Team | W | L | Pct. | GB |
|---|---|---|---|---|
| Industriales | 16 | 14 | .533 | - |
| Oriente | 16 | 14 | .533 | - |
| Occidentales | 15 | 15 | .500 | 1 |
| Azucareros | 13 | 17 | .433 | 3 |

Note: Industriales had been called Habana the previous season.

=== Tie-breaker ===
Industriales defeated Oriente, 2–1 games
