= 1963–64 Cuban National Series =

Baseball season in Cuba

1963–64 Cuban National Series Serie Nacional de Béisbol 1963–64
- League: Cuban National Series
- Sport: Baseball
- Number of games: 36
- Number of teams: 4

Regular season
- Champion: Industriales (22–13)

SNB seasons
- ← 1962–63 1964–65 →

The third Cuban National Series ended with the second straight championship for Industriales.

== Standings ==
Team	W	L	Pct.	GB
Industriales	22	13	.629	-
Occidentales	18	18	.500	4½
Azucareros	17	19	.472	5½
Orientales	14	21	.400	8

Note: Orientales had been named Oriente before this season.
