= 2002–03 Cuban National Series =

The 42nd Cuban National Series belonged to Industriales, who rode a 66-23 regular season into the playoffs, where they lost only two games before sweeping Villa Clara Naranjas in the final for their ninth title.

== Regular season standings ==
=== Western zone ===
Group A
| Team | W | L | Pct. |
|---|---|---|---|
| Pinar del Río | 56 | 34 | .622 |
| Isla de la Juventud | 41 | 48 | .461 |
| Matanzas | 41 | 49 | .456 |
| Metropolitanos | 41 | 49 | .456 |

Group B
| Team | W | L | Pct. |
|---|---|---|---|
| Industriales | 66 | 23 | .742 |
| Cienfuegos | 52 | 38 | .578 |
| La Habana | 51 | 39 | .567 |
| Sancti Spíritus | 49 | 41 | .544 |

=== Eastern zone ===
Group C
| Team | W | L | Pct. |
|---|---|---|---|
| Villa Clara | 56 | 34 | .622 |
| Camagüey | 44 | 46 | .489 |
| Ciego de Ávila | 37 | 53 | .411 |
| Las Tunas | 25 | 65 | .278 |

Group D
| Team | W | L | Pct. |
|---|---|---|---|
| Granma | 45 | 45 | .500 |
| Santiago de Cuba | 44 | 46 | .489 |
| Holguín | 43 | 47 | .478 |
| Guantánamo | 28 | 62 | .311 |

== Playoffs ==
Quarterfinals
B1 | Industriales | 3
B3 | La Habana | 1
West
A1 | Pinar del Río | 3
B2 | Cienfuegos | 2
C1 | Villa Clara | 3
D2 | Santiago de Cuba | 2
East
D1 | Granma | 3
C2 | Camagüey | 1

Semifinals
B1 | Industriales | 4
A1 | Pinar del Río | 1
C1 | Villa Clara | 4
D1 | Granma | 2

Finals
B1 | Industriales | 4
C1 | Villa Clara | 0
