= 1964–65 Cuban National Series =

Baseball season in Cuba

1964–65 Cuban National Series Serie Nacional de Béisbol 1964–65
- League: Cuban National Series
- Sport: Baseball
- Number of games: 39
- Number of teams: 4

Regular season
- Champion: Industriales (25–14)

SNB seasons
- ← 1963–64 1965–66 →

Industriales began to make a habit of Cuban National Series titles during the 1964-65 season, the fourth installment of Cuba's new post-revolutionary amateur baseball league. The team, representing Havana, won its third straight title.

== Standings ==
Team	W	L	Pct.	GB
Industriales	25	14	.641	-
Occidentales	21	18	.538	4
Granjeros	18	21	.461	7
Orientales	14	25	.359	8

Note: Granjeros had been named Azucareros prior to this season.
