= 1965–66 Cuban National Series =

Baseball season in Cuba

1965–66 Cuban National Series Serie Nacional de Béisbol 1965–66
- League: Cuban National Series
- Sport: Baseball
- Number of games: 65
- Number of teams: 6

Regular season
- Champion: Industriales (40–25)

SNB seasons
- ← 1964–65 1966–67 →

The fifth season of the Cuban National Series saw expansion both in the number of teams and the number of games played. Two new teams, Henequeneros and Centrales, were formed, and the schedule was nearly doubled, from 39 games per team to 65.

Industriales, after two years of dominating the standings, came back to the pack, as Orientales and the new Henequeneros squad were within three games of winning the title. However, Industriales were able to win their fourth straight series.

== Standings ==
Team	W	L	Pct.	GB
Industriales	40	25	.615	-
Orientales	38	27	.585	2
Henequeneros	37	28	.569	3
Occidentales	29	35	.453	10½
Granjeros	26	38	.406	13½
Centrales	23	40	.365	16
