= 1962 Cuban National Series =

Baseball season in Cuba

1961–62 Cuban National Series Serie Nacional de Béisbol 1961–62
- League: Cuban National Series
- Sport: Baseball
- Number of games: 27
- Number of teams: 4

Regular season
- Champion: Occidentales (18–9)

SNB seasons
- 1962–63 →

The inaugural season of the Cuban National Series was won by Occidentales, composed largely of players from Pinar del Río.

In 1961, the post-revolutionary government outlawed professional sports, including the Cuban League, a small professional baseball league. The Cuban baseball league system was formed, with the Cuban National Series as its top level of competition.

== Standings ==
Team	W	L	Pct.	GB
Occidentales	18	9	.667	–
Oriente	13	14	.481	5
Azucareros	13	14	.481	5
Habana	10	17	.370	8

Note: the Habana team became known as Industriales the following season.
