= Metropolitanos =

Cuban baseball team, 1974 to 2012

- Logo

Information
- League: Cuban National Series
- Location: Havana
- Ballpark: Estadio Latinoamericano
- Founded: 1962 (as Habana); 1974 (as Metropolitanos)
- Folded: 2011–12
- Nickname(s): Guerreros (Warriors), Metros
- 2011–12: 38–58 (7th, West Division)
- Manager: Juan Padilla

Current uniforms
Home	Away

The Metropolitanos were a baseball team in the Cuban National Series, based in the capital of Havana. During their existence, they were one of two teams based in the Havana, the other being the more successful Industriales.

Metropolitanos were officially established for the 1974-75 Cuban National Series, though they replaced another team, simply called Habana, which had existed since the inaugural National Series in 1962. Also known as the Guerreros (Warriors), the Metros (and before them, Habana) were ostensibly the heir to the Habana teams of the pre-revolutionary Cuban League (just as Industriales were the heir to Almendares).

== Overview ==
After professional baseball was abolished on the island during the Cuban Revolution, the baseball authorities formed two teams in Havana: Habana and Industriales. Habana, managed by formed Marianao skipper José María Fernández, defeated Industriales to qualify for the 1962 Cuban National Series as representative of the capital city. Habana was replaced by Industriales the following year, but returned with the National Series expansion of 1967–68, giving the capital two hometown squads in the same league for the first time; that season, it won the title under the management of Juan "Coco" Gomez, winning a record 74 games. Habana again won the title in the 1973–74 season, under manager Jorge Trigoura.

Metropolitanos were introduced in the 1974–75 Cuban National Series, when teams were restructured along provincial lines.

The team eventually gained a reputation as Havana's "other" club, compared to Industriales, with a diminished fan following. Metros were even treated as an unofficial farm club for its crosstown rivals, which Peter C. Bjarkman noted was unusual in a circuit where ballplayers were otherwise rarely traded or transferred; National Series officials frequently removed several promising young players from the Metropolitanos squad and sent them to Industriales. Players including René Arocha, Osvaldo Fernández, Yasser Gomez, Enrique Diaz, Yadel Martí and Antonio Scull had begun their careers with the Guerreros, only to be sent later to the Leones.

Despite this, the Metros nearly pulled off an upset to defeat Industriales in the 1999–2000 Cuban National Series playoffs, but ultimately collapsed after being up in the series 2–0. Years later, manager Eulogio Vilanova alleged that interests in the Baseball Federation of Cuba had colluded against Metros to give Industriales an unfair advantage in the series.

The Metropolitanos ceased operations at the end of the 2011–12 season.

== Notable players ==
=== Habana ===
- Pedro Chávez
- Santiago "Changa" Mederos

=== Metropolitanos ===
- Rey Vicente Anglada
- Enrique Díaz
- Rodolfo Puente
- Antonio Scull
- Rolando Verde
- Armando Capiró
- Jorge Salfrán
- Oscar Valdés
- Bombon Salazar
- Julian Villar
- Iván Correa
- Ernudis Poulot
- José Modesto Darcourt
- Rafael Gómez
- Lázaro de la Torre
- Ramón Villabrille
- Osvaldo Fernández Guerra
- Eduardo Rodríguez
- René Arocha
- Alejandro Zuaznabar
- Bárbaro Cañizares
- Javier Méndez
