= Industriales =

Baseball team in the Cuban National Series

- Logo

Information
- League: Cuban National Series (Occidental Zone)
- Location: Havana
- Ballpark: Estadio Latinoamericano
- Founded: 1961
- Nicknames: Leones ("Lions"); Azules ("Blues")
- Cuba national baseball system championships: 1963, 1964, 1965, 1966, 1973, 1986, 1992, 1996, 2003, 2004, 2006, 2010 (12)
- Former name: Habana (1962)
- Colors: Ocean blue and gray
- Manager: Guillermo Carmona

Current uniforms
Home	Away

Industriales is a baseball club in the Cuban National Series (SNB), representing the city of Havana and the surrounding province of the same name. It plays its home games at the Estadio Latinoamericano, located in the El Cerro neighborhood of Havana. Since Metropolitanos folded in 2012, Industriales have been the sole team representing the country's capital.

Industriales is one of the oldest teams in Cuban baseball, dating back to the second season of the National Series in 1962. The perceived successor to the Almendares baseball team from the professional Cuban League, it is historically the most successful team in the National Series.

The team has a strong rivalry with Santiago de Cuba, and their meetings are known as the Superclásico; the rivalry, which reflects the rivalry between the cities of Havana and Santiago de Cuba), has been compared to the Red Sox–Yankees rivalry due to its ferocity. Industriales are known as "the Lions" (Leones), "the Blues" (Azules), and "the Blue Lions" (los Leones Azules).

== History ==
The team was founded in 1961 after the end of professional baseball in Cuba. It did not participate in the inaugural National Series, but instead debuted in the second-level Regional Series; it lost to the Habana club. The next year, Industriales defeated Habana in the Serie Regional to qualify for the 1962–63 Cuban National Series, debuting on February 10, 1963 at the Estadio Latinoamericano. Its first manager was Pipo de la Noval, though he would be replaced in 1963 with Ramón Carneado. The team is frequently mentioned in Refugee by Alan Gratz as a team Ivañ wanted to play for.

The team won the Cuban National Series in 1963, 1964, 1965, 1966, 1973, 1986, 1992, 1996, 2003, 2004, 2006 and 2010. Today the team holds the record of victories in a season (96 games in Cuba) with 66 games and more National Series won in a row with 4 straight national championships (1963-1966).

== Championships ==
Season	Manager	Record	Series score	Runner-up
1962–63	Ramón Carneado	16–14	—	Oriente
1963–64	Ramón Carneado	22–13	—	Occidentales
1964–65	Ramón Carneado	25–14	—	Occidentales
1965–66	Ramón Carneado	40–25	—	Orientales
1972–73	Pedro Chávez	53–25	—	Habana
1985–86	Pedro Chávez	37–11	6–0	Vegueros
1962–63	Jorge Trigoura	36–12	7–1	Henequeneros
1995–96	Pedro Medina	41–22	8–2	Villa Clara
2002–03	Rey Vicente Anglada	66–23	11–2	Villa Clara
2003–04	Rey Vicente Anglada	52–38	11–4	Villa Clara
2005–06	Rey Vicente Anglada	56–34	11–7	Santiago de Cuba
2009–10	Germán Mesa	47–43	12–6	Villa Clara
Total championships			12	

== National Series MVPs ==
The following Industriales players have been named the National Series' most valuable player.

- 1965: Urbano González
- 1967: Pedro Chávez
- 1971: Antonio Jiménez
- 1972: Agustín Marquetti
- 1986: Lázaro Vargas
- 1987: Javier Méndez
- 1996: Jorge Fumero
- 2003: Javier Méndez
- 2020: Lisbán Correa

== Other notable players ==
- Gerardo Concepción (pitcher)
- Yasser Gomez (outfielder)
- Orlando "El Duque" Hernández (pitcher)
- Raúl López (pitcher)
- Yadel Martí (pitcher)
- Pedro Medina (catcher)
- Javier Mendez (outfielder)
- Germán Mesa (shortstop)
- Kendrys Morales (pitcher-outfielder-infielder)
- Juan Padilla (second base)
- Amauri Sanit (pitcher)
- Carlos Tabares (centerfielder)
- Yoandry Urgelles (outfielder)
- Lázaro Valle (pitcher)

== Defectors ==
A number of Industriales players have defected from Cuba, often to pursue professional baseball in other countries. These include the following:

- René Arocha
- Bárbaro Cañizares
- Gerardo Concepción
- Yunel Escobar
- Bárbaro Garbey
- Adrian Hernández
- Michel Hernández
- Orlando Hernández
- Kendrys Morales
- Vladimir Núñez
- Rey Ordóñez
- William Ortega
- Hassan Peña
- Euclides Rojas
- Rolando Viera
- Yadel Martí
- Yasser Gomez
- Odrisamer Despaigne
- Yulieski Gurriel
- Lourdes Gurriel Jr.

== Television broadcasts ==
Beginning 2016-2017, alongside the nationally aired games on Tele Rebelde, several Industriales games at home are aired currently on local TV channel Canal Habana.
