= Baseball at the 1987 Pan American Games – Men's team rosters =

The following is a list of rosters for each nation that competed in the men's baseball tournament at the 1987 Pan American Games in Indianapolis.

== Key ==
Pos.	Position
P	Pitcher
C	Catcher
IF	Infielder
OF	Outfielder

== Teams ==
=== Aruba ===
Player	Pos.	DOB and age	Team
Aldwin Acosta	IF		
Henk Arnold	P		
Henry Barrera	C		
Franklin Danies	IF		
Johannes Flanegin	P		
Timoteo Geerman	P	22 August 1967 (aged 19)	
Orvin Gonzales	P		
Robert Henriquez			
Jacobo Jansen			
Frenk Kock	P		
Rudney Lopez			
Richard Mackay	P		
Richard Orman	P	16 January 1969 (aged 18)	
Alfredo Rafine			
Michael Rasmijn			
Guillermo Raymond			
Pierre Richardson	C		
Emiliano Thiel	IF		
Felix Thiel			
Clem Wernet			

=== Canada ===
Manager

(Canada) John Haar

Player	Pos.	DOB and age	Team
Denis Boucher	P	7 March 1968 (aged 19)	
Bill Byckowski			
Rhéal Cormier	P	23 April 1967 (aged 20)	Community College of Rhode Island
Randy Curran	IF, OF	23 February 1967 (aged 20)	Kitchener Panthers
Tim Dell	P	8 April 1967 (aged 20)	Huntington University
David Diachuk			
Larry Downes	C		
Greg Duce	IF	13 May 1965 (aged 22)	Grand Canyon Antelopes
Brad Harvie	IF		Vanderbilt Commodores
Rod Heisler	P	16 January 1957 (aged 30)	
Frank Humber	P	4 July 1967 (aged 20)	Wake Forest Demon Deacons
Rick Johnston			Toronto Maple Leafs
Jim Kotkas	OF	1 November 1964 (aged 22)	Southern Utah Thunderbirds
John Leonard		20 August 1966 (aged 20)	
Alan Mauthe		30 July 1964 (aged 23)	
Harold Northcutt	P		
Barry Parisotto	P	23 November 1967 (aged 19)	
Mike Ross	P	27 October 1967 (aged 19)	
Greg Roth	IF, OF	4 September 1966 (aged 20)	Cochise College
Dennis Springenatic	P		

=== Cuba ===
Manager

(Cuba) Higinio Vélez

Player	Pos.	DOB and age	Team
Pablo Abreu	P	23 March 1967 (aged 20)	Industriales
Omar Ajete	P	31 July 1965 (aged 22)	Vegueros
Luis Casanova	OF	5 December 1956 (aged 30)	Vegueros
Juan Castro	C	31 January 1954 (aged 33)	Vegueros
Lázaro de la Torre	P	10 October 1957 (aged 29)	Industriales
Jorge García	OF	5 January 1964 (aged 23)	Avispas de Santiago de Cuba
Rogelio García	P	16 September 1955 (aged 31)	Vegueros
Giraldo González	IF	29 May 1958 (aged 29)	Vegueros
Lourdes Gourriel	OF	9 March 1957 (aged 30)	Sancti Spíritus
Orestes Kindelán	IF, OF	1 November 1964 (aged 22)	Avispas de Santiago de Cuba
Omar Linares	IF	23 October 1967 (aged 19)	Vegueros
Pedro Medina	C	19 December 1952 (aged 34)	Industriales
Víctor Mesa	OF	20 February 1960 (aged 27)	Villa Clara
Alejo O'Reilly	IF	25 February 1961 (aged 26)	Ciego de Ávila
Antonio Pacheco	IF	4 June 1964 (aged 23)	Avispas de Santiago de Cuba
Euclides Rojas	P	25 August 1967 (aged 19)	Industriales
Luis Tissert	P	10 October 1956 (aged 30)	Avispas de Santiago de Cuba
Luis Ulacia	OF	24 September 1963 (aged 23)	Camagüey
Jorge Luis Valdés	P	12 February 1961 (aged 26)	Henequeneros
Lázaro Vargas	IF	18 January 1964 (aged 23)	Industriales

=== Netherlands Antilles ===
Player	Pos.	DOB and age	Team
Renato Anasagasti	IF	18 September 1960 (aged 26)	
Omar Ansjeliena	P		
Marlon Balentien	OF		
Mervin Beauperthuy	C		
Arthur Bonevacia			
Marlyson Brigitha			
Charlton Cijntje			
Michel Daou			
Elroy Ersilia			
Rafael Jozefa			
Edmond Martina			
Rignald Martina			
Orlando Nicolina	OF		
Hyacinth Richardson			
Rudson Roberto			
Raymond Soerka			
Rupert Straker			
Swendley Kleinmoedig			
Hensley Martinus			
Norwin Moeskiet		4 March 1961 (aged 26)	

=== Nicaragua ===
Manager

(Cuba) Argelio Córdoba

Player	Pos.	DOB and age	Team
John Allen Howard	P		
Benigno Arauz			
Barney Baltodano	P		
Manuel Cerda			
Ariel Delgado	IF	13 September 1960 (aged 26)	
Cayetano García	OF	7 May 1956 (aged 31)	
Próspero González	IF	25 November 1965 (aged 21)	
Tomás Guzmán	C	14 September 1961 (aged 25)	
Carel Lampson			
Franklin López	IF	29 June 1968 (aged 19)	
Julio Medina	IF	13 December 1962 (aged 24)	
Francisco Medrano			
Félix Moya	P		
Alvaro Muñoz	OF		
Arnoldo Muñoz	IF	21 May 1954 (aged 33)	
Ramón Padilla	OF	5 March 1966 (aged 21)	
Roger Peralta			
Epifanio Pérez	P	5 October 1965 (aged 21)	
Nemesio Porras	IF	7 October 1968 (aged 18)	
Berman Suarez	IF		

=== Puerto Rico ===
Manager

(Puerto Rico) José Carradero

Player	Pos.	DOB and age	Team
Eddie Ahorrio	OF		
Edwin Cuadrado	IF		
Gilberto Escalera			
Jesus Feliciano	P	27 March 1956 (aged 31)	
Luis Fontanez	IF		
Efraín García	IF	12 July 1962 (aged 25)	
Héctor Gutierrez			
José Lorenzana	C	13 September 1959 (aged 27)	
José Meléndez	P	2 September 1965 (aged 21)	
Angel Morales	OF	8 February 1965 (aged 22)	
José Ortiz			
Edwin Perez			
Mariano Quiñones	P	2 December 1954 (aged 32)	
Luis Ramos	IF	17 November 1962 (aged 24)	
Jorge Robles			
Helson Rodriguez	OF	2 April 1962 (aged 25)	
Abimael Rosario	IF	18 February 1966 (aged 21)	
Josué Salva			
Roberto Santana	IF		
Wilfredo Vélez	P	5 April 1966 (aged 21)	

=== United States ===
Manager

(United States) Ron Fraser

Player	Pos.	DOB and age	Team
Jim Abbott	P	19 September 1967 (aged 19)	Michigan Wolverines
Cris Carpenter	P	5 April 1965 (aged 22)	Georgia Bulldogs
Mike Fiore	OF	4 May 1966 (aged 21)	Miami Hurricanes
Larry Gonzales	C	28 March 1967 (aged 20)	Hawaii Rainbow Warriors
Ty Griffin	IF	5 September 1967 (aged 19)	Georgia Tech Yellow Jackets
Donald Guillot	OF	20 June 1964 (aged 23)	UT Rio Grande Valley Vaqueros
Steve Hecht	IF	12 November 1965 (aged 21)	Oral Roberts Golden Eagles
Rick Hirtensteiner	OF	9 October 1967 (aged 19)	Pepperdine Waves
Clyde Keller	P	7 February 1967 (aged 20)	Florida State Seminoles
Larry Lamphere	IF	2 July 1966 (aged 21)	Central Michigan Chippewas
Scott Livingstone	IF	15 July 1965 (aged 22)	Texas A&M Aggies
Tino Martínez	IF	7 December 1967 (aged 19)	Tampa Spartans
Chris Nichting	P	13 May 1966 (aged 21)	Northwestern Wildcats
Gregg Olson	P	11 October 1966 (aged 20)	Auburn Tigers
Jim Poole	P	28 April 1966 (aged 21)	Georgia Tech Yellow Jackets
Scott Servais	C	4 June 1967 (aged 20)	Creighton Bluejays
Dave Silvestri	IF	29 September 1967 (aged 19)	Missouri Tigers
Joe Slusarski	P	19 December 1966 (aged 20)	New Orleans Privateers
Ed Sprague Jr.	IF	25 July 1967 (aged 20)	Stanford Cardinal
Ted Wood	OF	4 January 1967 (aged 20)	New Orleans Privateers

=== Venezuela ===
Manager

(Venezuela) Pedro Ávila

Player	Pos.	DOB and age	Team
Pedro Armas	IF		
Jesús Borjas	IF		
Carlos Burguillos	OF		
Jesús Cartagena	OF		
Miguel Castaneda			
Evencio Chacón	C	8 January 1962 (aged 25)	
Julio Figueroa	P		
Pedro Frias			
José Garcia Soto			
José Garcia Tovar			
Jesús Gonzalez			
Reinaldo Gutierrez			
Gustavo Juaregui			
Sandy León Sr.			
Jesús Lopez			
Lino Nava	OF		
Luis Prieto	P		
Juan Ramos			
Franklin Reyes	P		
Derwin Roldan			
Ery Serrano			
Luis Tirado	P		
Orlando Torres	P		
Edgar Tovar	IF		
Elis Ugueto	IF		
Everth Velásquez	P		
