= Juan Padilla (second baseman) =

Cuban baseball player

- Second baseman
- Born: 16 September 1965 (age 61); Rancho Boyeros, Havana, Cuba
- Bats: Right Throws: Right

Teams
- Industriales (1987–2000)
Medals
Men's baseball
Representing Cuba
Olympic Games
Gold medal – first place	1992 Barcelona	Team
Gold medal – first place	1996 Atlanta	Team
Baseball World Cup
Gold medal – first place	1990 Edmonton	Team
Pan American Games
Gold medal – first place	1995 Mar del Plata	Team
Gold medal – first place	1999 Winnipeg	Team
Central American and Caribbean Games
Gold medal – first place	1993 Ponce	Team
Goodwill Games
Gold medal – first place	1990 Seattle	Team

Juan Padilla Alfonso (born 16 September 1965), nicknamed "La Aspiradora Azul" (The Blue Sweeper), was a member of the Gold Medal-winning Cuban team at the Olympics in 1992 and 1996.

== Cuban leagues ==
He drove in 63 runs for the Industriales in the 1987–1988 Serie Nacional to lead the league. In 1995–1996, he homered in the last game of the finals to give the Industriales the pennant. Overall, Padilla hit .307/.363/.447 in 17 seasons in Cuba and fielded .978. Through 2009, he ranked 10th all-time in assists (4,621) and 7th in double plays (1,224). He was 12th in sacrifice flies (70) and 7th with 68 triples, right between brothers Wilfredo Sanchez and Fernando Sanchez.

For the 1990s, he hit .322, tied for 10th with Luis Ulacia in that span.

An eye injury (unrelated to baseball) ended Padilla's career after the 2000 season. He later managed the Metropolitanos for several years.

== International career ==
Juan played for the Cuban national team in over a dozen events. He played in the 1986 Amateur World Series (2 for 3) and 1986 Central American and Caribbean Games (1 for 2). In the 1988 Baseball World Cup, the 22-year-old was 1 for 6 and made one error in six chances as a backup to Antonio Pacheco at 2B and Luis Ulacia at SS. With the gold medal game tied at three in the bottom of the 9th, he pinch-ran for Orestes Kindelan and came home on a single by Lazaro Vargas off Andy Benes to give Cuba a 4-3 come-from-behind win over Team USA.

Padilla played in the 1989 Intercontinental Cup, going 0 for 2 for the champs. In the 1990 Baseball World Cup, Padilla was two for four with a double as the backup to Pacheco at second, Cuba taking Gold. In the 1991 Intercontinental Cup, Juan was Cuba's starters and hit .275/.333/.450 with 9 RBI in 11 games, tying Lazaro Junco for second on Cuba behind Luis Casanova. He tied for 4th in the event with two homers. He was named the tournament All-Star second baseman, beating out Japan's Koichi Oshima, who had better stats. He was 0 for 3 in the gold medal game and made an error but Cuba squeaked past Taiwan, 2-1.

In the 1992 Olympics, Padilla got into just one game as Pacheco's backup, going 3 for 5 with 3 RBI against Spain. The Havana native was 0 for 1 in the 1993 Intercontinental Cup as a defensive sub for Pacheco; in four games, he handled two chances without an error. He did not play in the gold medal game win versus the USA. He went 0 for 1 in the 1993 Central American and Caribbean Games.

Padilla was 0 for 1 in the 1994 Baseball World Cup, backing up Omar Linares at third base. In the 1995 Intercontinental Cup, he went 2 for 12 while backing up Pacheco. He was 1 for 4 in the 1995 Pan American Games. He played six innings in five games as a defensive sub for Pacheco in the 1996 Olympics and singled in his lone at-bat, scoring a run. He was with Cuba for game two of the 1999 Baltimore Orioles – Cuban national baseball team exhibition series.

Padilla managed Cuba in the 2004 Haarlem Baseball Week and the Ecuador national baseball team in the 2006 COPABE Olympic Qualifiers.
