= Lourdes Gourriel =

Cuban baseball player (born 1957)

Lourdes Gurriel
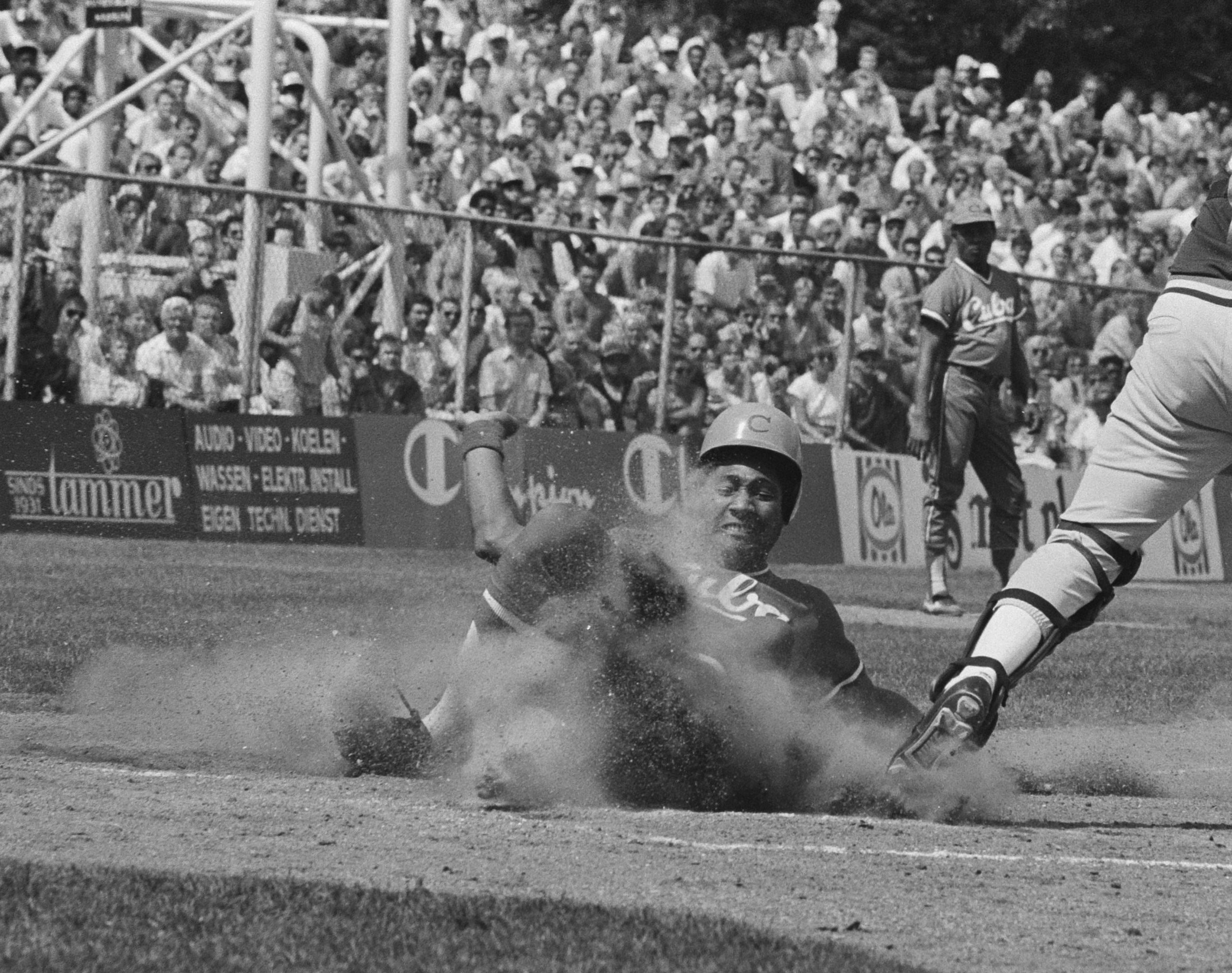
- Gurriel in 1986
- First baseman
- Born: March 9, 1957 (age 69); Sancti Spíritus, Cuba
- Bats: Right Throws: Right
- Stats at Baseball Reference

Career highlights and awards
- Baseball World Cup MVP (1994)
Medals
Men's baseball
Representing Cuba
Olympic Games
Gold medal – first place	1992 Barcelona	Team
Baseball World Cup
Gold medal – first place	1980 Tokyo	Team
Gold medal – first place	1984 Havana	Team
Gold medal – first place	1986 Amsterdam	Team
Gold medal – first place	1988 Rome	Team
Gold medal – first place	1990 Edmonton	Team
Gold medal – first place	1994 Managua	Team
Intercontinental Cup
Gold medal – first place	1979 Havana	Team
Silver medal – second place	1981 Edmonton	Team
Gold medal – first place	1983 Brussels	Team
Gold medal – first place	1985 Edmonton	Team
Gold medal – first place	1987 Havana	Team
Gold medal – first place	1989 San Juan	Team
Gold medal – first place	1993 Italy	Team
Gold medal – first place	1995 Havana	Team
Pan American Games
Gold medal – first place	1983 Caracas	Team
Gold medal – first place	1987 Indianapolis	Team
Gold medal – first place	1991 Havana	Team
Gold medal – first place	1995 Mar del Plata	Team
Central American and Caribbean Games
Silver medal – second place	1982 Havana	Team
Gold medal – first place	1986 Santiago de los Caballeros	Team
Gold medal – first place	1990 Mexico City	Team
Gold medal – first place	1993 Ponce	Team
Goodwill Games
Gold medal – first place	1990 Seattle	Team

Lourdes Gourriel Delgado (born 25 March 1957) is a Cuban former baseball player. He played his entire career in the Cuban National Series, and appeared with the Cuba national baseball team in nearly all of its international competitions from the late 1970s to mid 1990s, becoming an Olympic gold medalist.

== Domestic career ==
Gourriel played in the Cuban National Series. He won the Cuban National Series Rookie of the Year Award during the 1976-77 Cuban National Series for Azucareros. In 1978–1979, he hit 12 doubles to tie Armando Capiró and Jorge Beltrán for the Serie Nacional lead. He debuted with the Cuba national baseball team that year, hitting .294 in the 1979 Intercontinental Cup.

Gourriel led the 1979–1980 Serie Nacional with 77 hits. In the 1988 Selective Series, he hit .430 to win the batting title. In the 1989–1990 National Series, he drew 8 intentional walks to tie Alejo O'Reilly for the lead in his region.

The old-timer kept on hitting in 1993–1994, winning a National Series batting crown (.395) and also leading in doubles (19). He won the Cuban National Series Most Valuable Player Award. In the 1994–1995 Serie Nacional, Gourriel led with 18 intentional walks. He spent his final summer with the national team, hitting .464 to lead the 1995 Pan American Games.

== International career ==
In the 1980 Amateur World Series, he hit .452 to help Cuba to the gold medal and got the game-winning hit in one 5–4 game versus Team USA.

He hit .297 in the 1981 Intercontinental Cup. In the 1982 Central American and Caribbean Games, he batted .217 but tied Pedro Jose Rodriguez Sr. for the lead with six RBI. He batted .429 with a leading 4 doubles in the 1983 Intercontinental Cup and joined Eric Fox and Victor Mesa on the All-Star outfield for the tourney. He hit .526 in the 1983 Pan American Games.

During the 1984 Amateur World Series, Gourriel hit .309/.356/.636, scored 12 runs and drove in 16 to tie Barry Bonds for the lead. He also led with 7 doubles. Overall, he outproduced Bonds, his counterpart in left field. In the 1985 Intercontinental Cup, he hit .414. He then batted .524 in the 1986 Central American and Caribbean Games.

In the 1986 Amateur World Series, the left fielder hit .357, slugged .500 and scored 12 runs. The next year, he hit .321 in the 1987 Pan American Games and .327 in the 1987 Intercontinental Cup.

Gourriel dazzled in the 1988 Baseball World Cup. He hit .500/.579/1.000 to lead in slugging. He also hit two major home runs. In the last round-robin game, he came up with two on, one out and a 9–6 deficit in the 9th inning, then smashed a 3-run homer off of Joe Slusarski to tie it; Cuba would go on to beat Team USA. In the gold medal game, he hit a game-tying homer in the 9th against Jim Abbott to again ruin America's hopes. He made the tourney All-Star team, joining Luis Casanova and Daisuke Tsutsui in the outfield.

In the 1989 Intercontinental Cup, Lourdes again was in the All-Star outfield, having hit .435 and slugged .913. In the finale against Japan, he drove in four of Cuba's 8 runs. He was 5th in the tournament in average. He won the MVP award for the tourney.

He batted .429 in the 1990 Central American and Caribbean Games. In the 1990 Baseball World Cup, Gourriel hit .463/.522/.902 for the gold medalists with 12 runs and 19 RBI in 10 games. He tied Antonio Pacheco for third in homers (4), trailing Orestes Kindelan and Omar Linares. He led with 25 hits and trailed only Kindelan in RBI. He made the All-Star team as the best first baseman in the competition. He played for Cuba in the 1990 Goodwill Games when they won Gold.

During the 1991 Pan American Games, the 34-year-old veteran hit .419 and tied Kindelan and Chris Roberts for the lead with four homers. He made the All-Star team as the top first baseman.

In the 1992 Olympics, Gourriel batted .400/.439/.692 with 9 runs and 10 RBI in nine games as the #5 hitter and first baseman for the Gold Medal Cubans, including a 3 for 5 effort against Taiwan in the finals.

In the 1993 Intercontinental Cup, Gourriel hit .390/.391/.683 as the DH for the champions. He tied Linares for 4th with 16 RBI and tied for fourth with three homers. He was the tournament's All-Star DH, giving him five All-Star nods in the past five major international tourneys he had played in (excluding the Olympics, which did not name an All-Star; he would have been a likely choice at first). In the 1993 Central American and Caribbean Games, he batted .444 and led with 12 hits.

In the 1994 Baseball World Cup, the 37-year-old remained at the top of his game, winning the MVP honors after hitting .429/.488/.881 with 4 homers, 15 runs and 18 RBI in 10 games. He led the Cup in RBI, tied for the lead in triples (2), tied for third in hits and tied for fifth in home runs. He was chosen as the All-Star DH for his sixth All-Star selection in his last six major world tournaments that picked an All-Star team.

== Managerial career ==
After retiring as a player, Gourriel became a manager. He guided Centrales to a 2003 Super League title. He also managed Sancti Spiritus, for which his sons played. He coached for Cuba in the 2005 Baseball World Cup and 2009 World Baseball Classic.

Gourriel led Sancti Spíritus for 7 seasons (2000–2001 to 2006–2007) then spent two years managing in Nicaragua. He returned to his old Cuban squad in 09-10 and managed them to a 63–27 record, the league's best, before they fell in the playoffs 4 games to 1 to the Industriales, major underdogs. After a 49–41 record in 2010–2011, he was replaced by Ruperto Zamora.

== Personal life ==
He is the father of Yuli Gurriel and Lourdes Gurriel Jr. Both his sons became professional players in Major League Baseball after defecting from Cuba in February 2016.
