= Jorge Luis Valdés =

Cuban baseball player (1961–2025)

- Pitcher
- Born: 12 February 1961; Jovellanos, Matanzas Province, Cuba
- Died: 28 January 2025 (aged 63); Matanzas, Cuba
- Batted: Left Threw: Left
Medals
Men's baseball
Representing Cuba
Olympic Games
Gold medal – first place	1992 Barcelona	Team
Baseball World Cup
Gold medal – first place	1984 Havana	Team
Gold medal – first place	1986 Amsterdam	Team
Gold medal – first place	1988 Rome	Team
Gold medal – first place	1990 Edmonton	Team
Intercontinental Cup
Gold medal – first place	1983 Brussels	Team
Gold medal – first place	1985 Edmonton	Team
Gold medal – first place	1987 Havana	Team
Gold medal – first place	1989 San Juan	Team
Gold medal – first place	1993 Italy	Team
Pan American Games
Gold medal – first place	1983 Caracas	Team
Gold medal – first place	1987 Indianapolis	Team
Gold medal – first place	1991 Havana	Team
Central American and Caribbean Games
Silver medal – second place	1982 Havana	Team
Gold medal – first place	1986 Santiago de los Caballeros	Team
Gold medal – first place	1990 Mexico City	Team
Gold medal – first place	1993 Ponce	Team
Goodwill Games
Gold medal – first place	1990 Seattle	Team

Jorge Luis Valdés Berriel (12 February 1961 – 28 January 2025), nicknamed "Tati", was a Cuban baseball pitcher who was Olympic Champion with Cuba at the 1992 Summer Olympics. Valdés is considered the best left-handed pitcher in the history of the Cuban National Series.

Valdés died on 28 January 2025, at the age of 63.
