= Osvaldo Fernández =

Cuban baseball player (born 1966)

- Pitcher
- Born: November 4, 1966 (age 59); Holguín, Cuba
- Batted: Right Threw: Right

MLB debut
- April 5, 1996, for the San Francisco Giants

Last MLB appearance
- August 8, 2001, for the Cincinnati Reds

MLB statistics
- Win–loss record: 19–26
- Earned run average: 4.93
- Strikeouts: 208
- Stats at Baseball Reference

Teams
- San Francisco Giants (1996–1997); Cincinnati Reds (2000–2001)
Medals
Men's baseball
Representing Cuba
Olympic Games
Gold medal – first place	1992 Barcelona	Team
Baseball World Cup
Gold medal – first place	1990 Edmonton	Team
Gold medal – first place	1994 Managua	Team
Pan American Games
Gold medal – first place	1991 Havana	Team
Gold medal – first place	1995 Mar del Plata	Team
Central American and Caribbean Games
Gold medal – first place	1990 Mexico City	Team
Gold medal – first place	1993 Ponce	Team
Goodwill Games
Gold medal – first place	1990 Seattle	Team

Osvaldo Fernández Rodríguez (born November 4, 1966) is a Cuban former professional baseball player who pitched in Major League Baseball for the San Francisco Giants in 1996 and 1997 and Cincinnati Reds in 2000 and 2001.

He was a member of the Cuban national team that won a gold medal at the 1992 Summer Olympics in Barcelona. On July 29, 1995, Fernández defected when Cuba played the United States in Millington, Tennessee.

Before defecting, Fernández pitched for Holguín in the Cuban National Series. He signed with the Giants organization in before the 1996 season.

== See also ==
- List of baseball players who defected from Cuba
