= Baseball at the 1993 Central American and Caribbean Games =

- Dates: 20 – 29 November 1993
- Competitors: 171 from 8 nations
- Teams: 8

Medalists
| gold medal | Cuba |
| silver medal | Mexico |
| bronze medal | Puerto Rico |

Baseball was contested at the 1993 Central American and Caribbean Games in Ponce, Puerto Rico from 20 to 29 November 1993.

The tournament was contested by eight national teams in a round robin format, with the top four advancing to the semi-finals. Cuba won the gold medal, defeating Mexico in the final, with Mexico taking the silver medal and hosts Puerto Rico claiming the bronze after defeating Nicaragua in the bronze medal game.

== Participating nations ==
A total of eight countries participated. The number of athletes a nation entered is in parentheses beside the name of the country.

- Aruba (19)
- Cuba (22)
- Mexico (21)
- Netherlands Antilles (22)
- Nicaragua (21)
- Panama (22)
- Puerto Rico (22)
- Venezuela (22)

== Medal summary ==
| Event | Gold | Silver | Bronze |
|---|---|---|---|
| Men’s tournament | Cuba; Omar Ajete; Rolando Arrojo; José Raúl Delgado; José Estrada; Osvaldo Fernández; Lourdes Gourriel; Ernesto Guevara; Alberto Hernández; Orlando Hernández; Orestes Kindelán; Juan Carlos Linares; Omar Linares; Germán Mesa; Víctor Mesa; Ángel Núñez; Antonio Pacheco; Juan Padilla; Eduardo Paret; Gabriel Pierre; Ermidelio Urrutia; José Luis Valdez; Lázaro Valle | Mexico; Carlos Arizaga; Ricardo Cabello; Tomás Cazares; José Contreras; José Duarte; Cutberto Espinoza; Edmundo Gracia; Juan Huazequi; Alejandro Newman; José Núñez; Jesús Olague; Ramón Pacheco; José Rentería; Alonso Reyes; Daniel Soto; Carlos Treviño; Alberto Vargas; Erasmo Velasco; Manuel Vélez; Francisco Villa; Rolando Zúñiga | Puerto Rico; Pedro Álamo; Jorge Arazamendi; Luis Batista; Albert Bracero; Edwin Corps; Luis Cintrón; Miguel Figueroa; Efraín García; Gualberto López; Roberto López; José Lorenzana; José Mateo; Efraín Nieves; José Novedo; Rolando Pavón; Luis Ramos; Abimael Rosario; Nelson Sánchez; Rafael Santiago; Edgardo Santos; Wilfredo Vélez; Nelson Vicenty |

== Round robin ==
| Pos | Team | Pld | W | L | RF | RA | RD | PCT | GB | Qualification |
|---|---|---|---|---|---|---|---|---|---|---|
| 1 | Cuba | 7 | 7 | 0 | 60 | 3 | +57 | 1.000 | — | Advance to Knockout stage |
| 2 | Nicaragua | 7 | 5 | 2 | 28 | 24 | +4 | .714 | 2 | Advance to Knockout stage |
| 3 | Mexico | 7 | 4 | 3 | 26 | 12 | +14 | .571 | 3 | Advance to Knockout stage |
| 4 | Puerto Rico (H) | 7 | 4 | 3 | 28 | 27 | +1 | .571 | 3 | Advance to Knockout stage |
| 5 | Netherlands Antilles | 7 | 2 | 5 | 21 | 36 | −15 | .286 | 5 | |
| 6 | Panama | 7 | 2 | 5 | 10 | 27 | −17 | .286 | 5 | |
| 7 | Venezuela | 7 | 2 | 5 | 14 | 31 | −17 | .286 | 5 | |
| 8 | Aruba | 7 | 2 | 5 | 8 | 35 | −27 | .286 | 5 | |

Source: XVII Juegos Deportivos Centroamericanos y del Caribe
(H) Hosts

=== Results ===
| 20 November 1993 | Panama | 4 – 3 | Venezuela |

| 20 November 1993 | Mexico | 10 – 0 | Netherlands Antilles |

| 20 November 1993 | Cuba | 16 – 0 | Nicaragua |

| 20 November 1993 | Puerto Rico | 7 – 1 | Aruba |

| 21 November 1993 | Cuba | 1 – 0 | Mexico |

| 21 November 1993 | Nicaragua | 8 – 0 | Puerto Rico |

| 21 November 1993 | Netherlands Antilles | 4 – 3 | Venezuela |

| 21 November 1993 | Aruba | 2 – 1 | Panama |

| 22 November 1993 | Panama | 4 – 2 | Netherlands Antilles |

| 22 November 1993 | Nicaragua | 4 – 0 | Aruba |

| 22 November 1993 | Cuba | 10 – 0 | Venezuela |

| 22 November 1993 | Mexico | 6 – 3 | Puerto Rico |

| 23 November 1993 | Cuba | 10 – 0 | Aruba |

| 23 November 1993 | Nicaragua | 3 – 2 | Venezuela |

| 23 November 1993 | Mexico | 4 – 0 | Panama |

| 23 November 1993 | Puerto Rico | 6 – 1 | Netherlands Antilles |

| 24 November 1993 | Nicaragua | 7 – 2 | Netherlands Antilles |

| 24 November 1993 | Aruba | 3 – 1 | Mexico |

| 24 November 1993 | Cuba | 10 – 0 | Panama |

| 24 November 1993 | Puerto Rico | 9 – 1 | Venezuela |

| 25 November 1993 | Mexico | 4 – 3 | Nicaragua |

| 25 November 1993 | Puerto Rico | 3 – 1 | Panama |

| 25 November 1993 | Venezuela | 3 – 0 | Aruba |

| 25 November 1993 | Cuba | 4 – 3 | Netherlands Antilles |

| 26 November 1993 | Netherlands Antilles | 9 – 2 | Aruba |

| 26 November 1993 | Venezuela | 2 – 1 | Mexico |

| 26 November 1993 | Nicaragua | 3 – 0 | Panama |

| 26 November 1993 | Cuba | 9 – 0 | Puerto Rico |

== Knockout stage ==
Semi-finals
28 November
Cuba | 9
Puerto Rico | 4
28 November
Mexico | 3
Nicaragua | 1

Final
29 November
Cuba | 11
Mexico | 1
Bronze medal game
29 November
Puerto Rico | 8
Nicaragua | 1

== Statistical leaders ==
=== Batting ===
| Statistic | Player | Total |
|---|---|---|
| Batting average | (Panama) Rodolfo Aparicio | .579 |
| Runs batted in | (Nicaragua) José Padilla | 9 |
| Hits | (Cuba) Lourdes Gourriel | 12 |
| Hits | (Cuba) Omar Linares | 12 |
| Runs | (Cuba) José Estrada | 10 |
| Runs | (Cuba) Antonio Pacheco | 10 |
| Home runs | (Cuba) Antonio Pacheco | 3 |
| Home runs | (Cuba) Orestes Kindelán | 3 |
| Slugging percentage | (Cuba) Omar Linares | .857 |
| Stolen bases | (Nicaragua) Sandy Moreno | 5 |
| Stolen bases | (Panama) Rodolfo Aparicio | 5 |

=== Pitching ===
| Statistic | Name | Total |
|---|---|---|
| Wins | (Cuba) Rolando Arrojo | 2 |
| Wins | (Mexico) Juan Huazequi | 2 |
| Wins | (Puerto Rico) Rafael Santiago | 2 |
| Losses | 5 tied with (Note: Carlos Cardona, Roland Eknet, Ronnie Inecia, Edis González and José Luis Quiroz) | 2 |
| Innings pitched | (Aruba) Clem Eknet | 18.0 |
| Earned runs allowed | (Cuba) Rolando Arrojo | 0.00 |
| Earned runs allowed | (Nicaragua) Marvin Zelaya | 0.00 |
| Strikeouts | (Netherlands Antilles) Allan Halley | 16 |
