= Baseball at the 1990 Central American and Caribbean Games =

- Venue: Estadio de Béisbol Monterrey
- Dates: 21 November – 2 December 1990
- Competitors: 138 from 7 nations
- Teams: 7

Medalists
gold medal	Cuba
silver medal	Puerto Rico
bronze medal	Dominican Republic

Baseball was contested at the 1990 Central American and Caribbean Games in Monterrey, Mexico from 21 November to 2 December 1990. All of the games were played at Estadio de Béisbol Monterrey.

The tournament was contested by seven national teams in a round robin format, with the top four advancing to the semi-finals. Cuba won the gold medal, defeating Puerto Rico in the final, with Puerto Rico taking the silver medal and Dominican Republic claiming the bronze after defeating hosts Mexico in the bronze medal game.

== Participating nations ==
A total of seven countries participated. The number of athletes a nation entered is in parentheses beside the name of the country.

- Cuba (20)
- Dominican Republic (20)
- El Salvador (18)
- Guatemala (20)
- Mexico (20)
- Netherlands Antilles (20)
- Puerto Rico (20)

== Venue ==
Monterrey, Nuevo León	Baseball at the 1990 Central American and Caribbean Games is located in Mexico
Estadio de Béisbol Monterrey	Baseball at the 1990 Central American and Caribbean Games is located in Mexico

== Medal summary ==
Event	Gold	Silver	Bronze
Men's baseball	Cuba (CUB); Omar Ajete; Iván Álvarez; René Arocha; José Raúl Delgado; Osvaldo Fernández; Lourdes Gourriel; Omar Linares; Lázaro López; Javier Méndez; Germán Mesa; Víctor Mesa; Juan Carlos Millán; Antonio Pacheco; Orestes Kindelán; Pedro Rodríguez; Euclides Rojas; Luis Ulacia; Ermidelio Urrutia; Jorge Luis Valdés; Lázaro Valle	Puerto Rico (PUR); Carlos Álvarez; Jorge Aranzamendi; Jesús Feliciano; James Figueroa; Efraín García; Francisco Hernáiz; Roberto López; José Lorenzana; Luis Nieves; Efraín Nieves; Ángel Morales; Alberto Muñoz; Sigfredo Rivera; Ariel Robles; Sigfredo Rivera; Helson Rodríguez; Abimael Rosario; Josué Salva; Rafael Santiago; Wilfredo Vélez	Dominican Republic (DOM); Eddy Batista; Ramón Castillo; José Ramón Clime; Rafael Debrand; Félix Espinal; Juan Luis Genao; Epifanio González; Benjamín Heredia; Alejandro Madera; Vincio Minier; Rafael Monegro; César Morales; Aquiles Peña; Teófilo Peña; Juan Piña; Arquimedez Pozo; Freddy Soto; Alfredo Teo; José Ramón Veras; Bernardino Valera

== Round robin ==
Pos	Team	Pld	W	L	RF	RA	RD	PCT	GB	Qualification
1	Cuba	6	6	0	63	6	+57	1.000	—	Advance to Knockout stage
2	Mexico (H)	6	4	2	36	22	+14	.667	2	Advance to Knockout stage
3	Puerto Rico	6	4	2	32	23	+9	.667	2	Advance to Knockout stage
4	Dominican Republic	6	3	3	42	24	+18	.500	3	Advance to Knockout stage
5	Netherlands Antilles	6	3	3	18	32	−14	.500	3	
6	El Salvador	6	1	5	19	56	−37	.167	5	
7	Guatemala	6	0	6	5	52	−47	.000	6	

Source: XVI Juegos Deportivos Centroamericanos y del Caribe
(H) Hosts

== Knockout stage ==
Semi-finals
Cuba	10
Dominican Republic	0
Mexico	1
Puerto Rico	5

Final
Cuba	9
Puerto Rico	2
Bronze medal game
Mexico	2
Dominican Republic	3

== Statistical leaders ==
=== Batting ===
Statistic	Player	Total
Batting average	(Cuba) Orestes Kindelán	.560
Batting average	(Cuba) Antonio Pacheco	.560
Runs batted in	(Cuba) Orestes Kindelán	15
Hits	(Cuba) Orestes Kindelán	14
Hits	(Cuba) Antonio Pacheco	14
Runs	(Cuba) Orestes Kindelán	12
Home runs	(Cuba) Orestes Kindelán	6
Stolen bases	(Netherlands Antilles) Sharnol Adriana	3
Stolen bases	(Netherlands Antilles) Sherton Saturnino	3

=== Pitching ===
Statistic	Name	Total
Wins	(Mexico) Juan Huazequi	2
Wins	(Puerto Rico) Jesús Feliciano	2
Wins	(Netherlands Antilles) Reginald Martina	2
Earned runs allowed	(Netherlands Antilles) Arthur Bonevacia	0.00
Earned runs allowed	(Mexico) Juan Huazequi	0.00
Earned runs allowed	(Cuba) Jorge Luis Valdés	0.00
Innings pitched	(Netherlands Antilles) Arthur Bonevacia	18.1
