= Euclides Rojas =

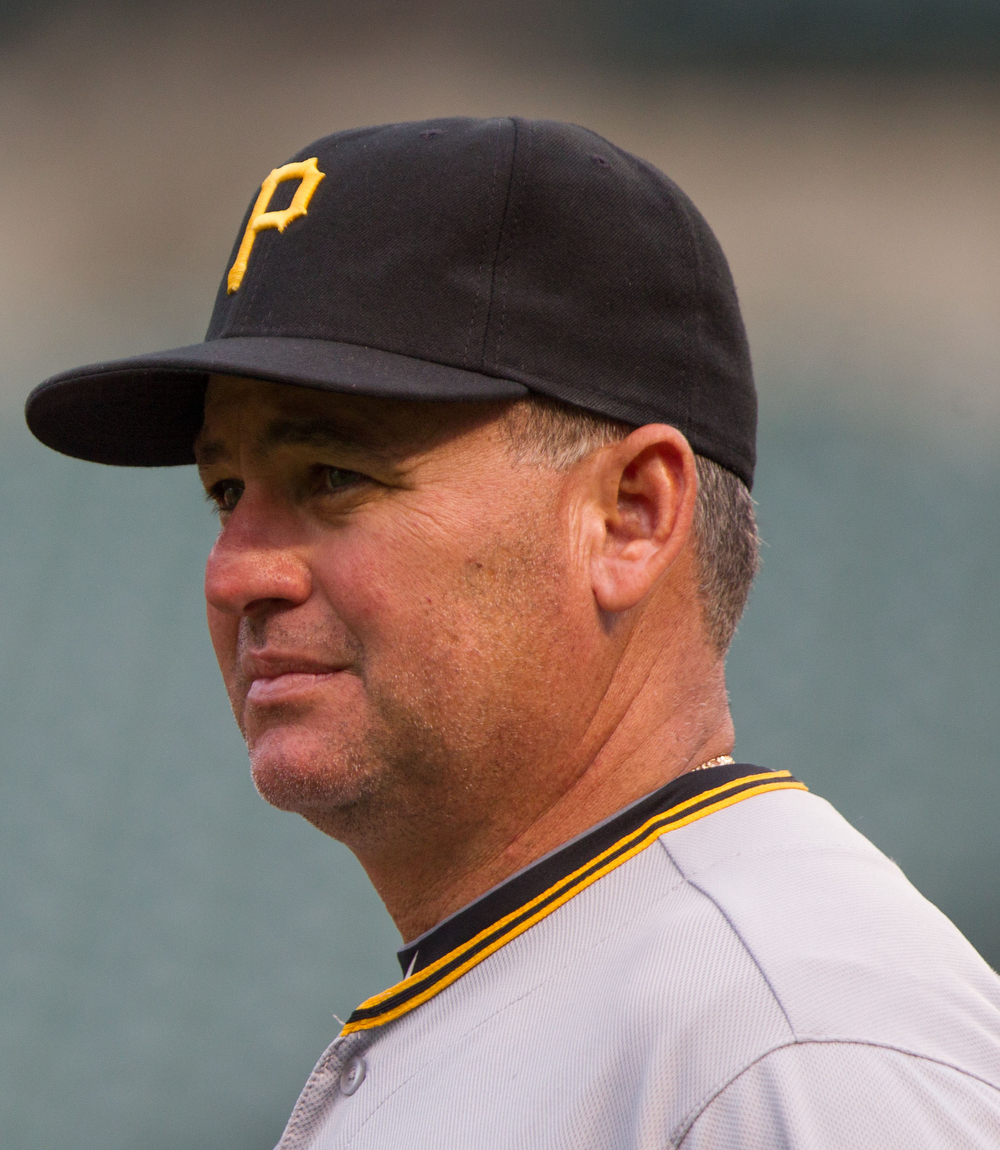
- Rojas as coach for the Pittsburgh Pirates in 2012

Detroit Tigers
- Coach
- Born: August 25, 1967 (age 59); Havana, Cuba
- Bats: Right Throws: Right
- Stats at Baseball Reference

Teams
- As coach: Florida Marlins (1999); Boston Red Sox (2003–2004); Pittsburgh Pirates (2011–2019)

Career highlights and awards
- World Series champion (2004)
Medals
Men's baseball
Representing Cuba
Baseball World Cup
| Gold medal – first place | 1988 Rome | Team |
| Gold medal – first place | 1990 Edmonton | Team |
Pan American Games
| Gold medal – first place | 1987 Indianapolis | Team |
| Gold medal – first place | 1991 Havana | Team |
Central American and Caribbean Games
| Gold medal – first place | 1990 Mexico | Team |
Goodwill Games
| Gold medal – first place | 1990 Seattle | Team |

Euclides Rojas (born August 25, 1967) is a Cuban-born coach and player development official in Major League Baseball. He was most recently the bullpen coach of the Pittsburgh Pirates.

== Career ==
Rojas was a right-handed relief pitcher in his playing days. He was the Cuban National Team's all-time leader in saves before he and 12 others left their homeland by raft in 1994, were rescued by the United States Coast Guard, and eventually emigrated to the United States. Rojas played independent league baseball in 1995 before being acquired by the Florida Marlins in his adopted city of Miami. Rojas pitched for two seasons in the Marlins' system — including service with the Triple-A Charlotte Knights for eight games — before injuries ended his active career. He won four games and lost six, appearing in 29 games with an earned run average of 4.56. He batted right-handed and stood 6 feet (1.83 m) tall and weighed 210 pounds (95 kg) as an active player.

In 1997, he became a full-time coach in the Marlins' system, a post that he held through 2001. In 1999, he was briefly a member of the Marlins' MLB coaching staff, serving as interim bullpen coach. He spent the 2002 season with the Pirates as Latin American pitching coordinator, and rejoined the Pittsburgh system in 2005.

He became a naturalized United States citizen in 2000.

Rojas spent six seasons (2005–2010) as the Pirates' Latin American field coordinator of instruction. He was the bullpen coach of the Boston Red Sox during the full seasons of 2003–2004, a period during which the Red Sox went to Game 7 of the 2003 American League Championship Series and won the 2004 American League pennant and the 2004 World Series.

Beginning in the 2022 season, he was named the Detroit Tigers' Director of Latin American Player Development.

== See also ==
- List of baseball players who defected from Cuba

Sporting positions
| Preceded by Bob Kipper | Boston Red Sox bullpen coach 2003–2004 | Succeeded by Bill Haselman |
| Preceded by Luis Dorante | Pittsburgh Pirates bullpen coach 2011–2019 | Succeeded by Justin Meccage |
