= Baseball at the 1987 Pan American Games =

- Venue: Bush Stadium; Indianapolis, Indiana, U.S.
- Competitors: 8 teams

Medalists
Gold medal	Cuba
Silver medal	United States
Bronze medal	Puerto Rico

Baseball at the 1987 Pan American Games was contested between teams representing Aruba, Canada, Cuba, Netherlands Antilles, Nicaragua, Puerto Rico, United States, and Venezuela. The 1987 edition was the 10th Pan American Games, and was hosted by Indianapolis, Indiana. The baseball competition was held at Bush Stadium, then the home ballpark of the Triple-A Indianapolis Indians.

Cuba entered the competition as the four-time defending champions, having won the gold medal in 1971, 1975, 1979, and 1983. They successfully defended their title, with the United States finishing second.

== Clash between Cuban players and anti-Castro protestors ==
Tension between Cuba and the United States had already been an issue with the selection of Indianapolis over Havana for the site of the games, and a Cuban boycott had been avoided only when Fidel Castro received a promise that the 1991 Pan American Games would be held in Havana. After the incident with a plane flying a banner urging Cuban athletes to defect in the opening ceremony, Cuban immigrants to the United States continued to use the games as a way to confront the Castro regime, using the Cuban athletes as a proxy. This games marked the first time since the Cuban Revolution that Cuban athletes had participated in the United States. At a baseball game in Bush Stadium between Cuba and the Netherlands Antilles the day after the opening ceremony, Cuban-American protestors taunted the Cuban players, threw flyers at them, and mocked them with offers of cash. A fight broke out, but only one bystander was injured and hospitalized after Indianapolis police broke up the fight by preventing the Cuban players from entering the stands. At a subsequent game against Puerto Rico, some Cuban players were able to enter the stands to chase protestors before being stopped.

== Summary ==
=== Medal table ===
Rank	Nation	Gold	Silver	Bronze	Total
1	Cuba	1	0	0	1
2	United States	0	1	0	1
3	Puerto Rico	0	0	1	1
Totals (3 entries)		1	1	1	3

=== Medalists ===
Event	Gold	Silver	Bronze
Men's	Cuba: Pablo Abreu; Omar Ajete; Luis Casanova; Juan Castro; Lázaro de la Torre; Jorge García; Rogelio García; Giraldo González; Lourdes Gourriel; Orestes Kindelán; Omar Linares; Pedro Medina; Víctor Mesa; Alejo O'Reilly; Antonio Pacheco; Euclides Rojas; Luis Tissert; Luis Ulacia; Jorge Luis Valdés; Lázaro Vargas	United States: Jim Abbott; Cris Carpenter; Mike Fiore; Larry Gonzales; Ty Griffin; Donald Guillot; Steve Hecht; Rick Hirtensteiner; Clyde Keller; Larry Lamphere; Scott Livingstone; Tino Martinez; Chris Nichting; Gregg Olson; Jim Poole; Scott Servais; Dave Silvestri; Joe Slusarski; Ed Sprague Jr.; Ted Wood	Puerto Rico: Eddie Ahorrio; Edwin Cuadrado; Gilberto Escalera; Jesús Feliciano; Luis Fontanez; Efraín García; Héctor Gutierrez; José Lorenzana; José Meléndez; Ángel Morales; José Ortiz; Edwin Pérez; Mariano Quiñones; Luis Ramos; Jorge Robles; Helson Rodriguez; Abimael Rosario; Josué Salva; Roberto Santana; Wilfredo Velez
