= Juan Padilla =

Juan Padilla may refer to:

- Juan Padilla (pitcher), Puerto Rican baseball pitcher
- Juan Padilla (second baseman), Cuban baseball second baseman
