= Lázaro Valle =

Cuban baseball player

Medal record

Representing Cuba

Men's baseball

Summer Olympics
| Silver medal – second place | 2000 Sydney | Team |

Baseball World Cup
| Gold medal – first place | 1988 Rome | Team |
| Gold medal – first place | 1990 Edmonton | Team |
| Gold medal – first place | 1994 Managua | Team |

Intercontinental Cup
| Gold medal – first place | 1989 San Juan | Team |
| Gold medal – first place | 1993 Italy | Team |
| Gold medal – first place | 1995 Havana | Team |

Central American and Caribbean Games
| Gold medal – first place | 1990 Mexico City | Team |
| Gold medal – first place | 1993 Ponce | Team |

Goodwill Games
| Gold medal – first place | 1990 Seattle | Team |

Lázaro Valle Martell (born December 18, 1962 in Old Havana, Cuba) is a former Cuban baseball player and Olympic silver medalist. He retired in 2002 to spend time with family.
