= Luis Ulacia =

Cuban baseball player

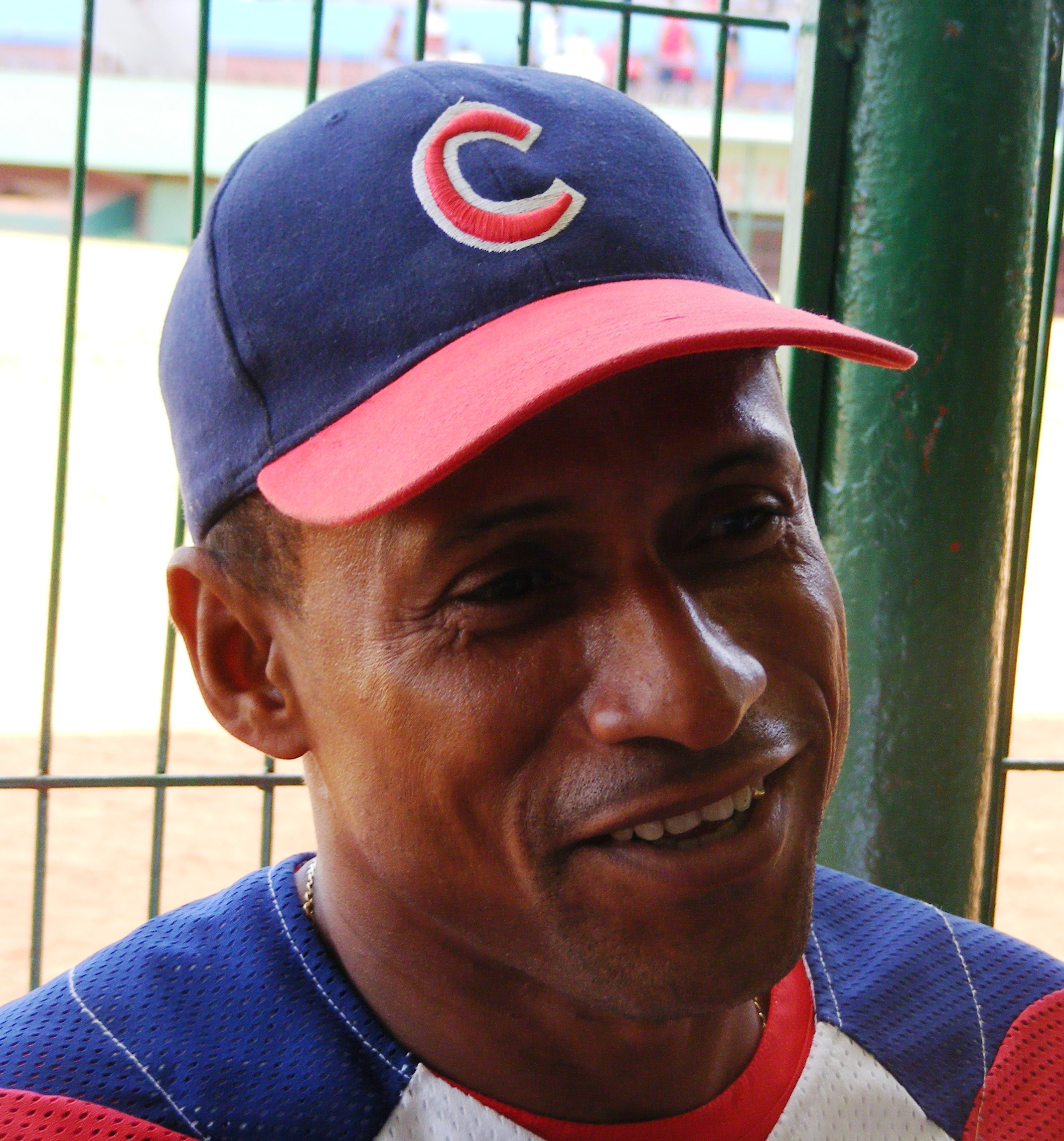
- Shortstop / Outfielder
- Born: September 24, 1963 (age 63); Havana, Cuba
- Bats: Switch Throws: Right
Medals
Men's baseball
Representing Cuba
Olympic Games
Gold medal – first place	1992 Barcelona	Team
Gold medal – first place	1996 Atlanta	Team
Silver medal – second place	2000 Sydney	Team
Baseball World Cup
Gold medal – first place	1986 Amsterdam	Team
Gold medal – first place	1988 Rome	Team
Gold medal – first place	1990 Edmonton	Team
Gold medal – first place	2001 Taipei	Team
Intercontinental Cup
Gold medal – first place	1987 Havana	Team
Gold medal – first place	1989 San Juan	Team
Silver medal – second place	1997 Barcelona	Team
Pan American Games
Gold medal – first place	1987 Indianapolis	Team
Gold medal – first place	1991 Havana	Team
Gold medal – first place	1995 Mar del Plata	Team
Gold medal – first place	1999 Winnipeg	Team
Central American and Caribbean Games
Gold medal – first place	1986 Santiago de los Caballeros	Team
Gold medal – first place	1990 Mexico City	Team
Goodwill Games
Gold medal – first place	1990 Seattle	Team

Luis Ulacia Álvarez (born September 24, 1963) is a Cuban baseball player, manager, and coach. He is an Olympic gold and silver medalist for baseball.

== Biography ==
Luis Ulacia Álvarez was born on September 24, 1963 in Havana, Cuba. His family moved to Camagüey when he was young. Ulacia learned to play baseball in Camagüey.

In 1982, Ulacia played professional baseball for Camagüey in the Cuban League. He started in professional baseball in the position of shortstop, but switched to right fielder where he excelled.

Ulacia also played for the Cuba national baseball team. He is a two-time Gold medalist for baseball, winning at the 1992 Summer Olympics in Barcelona, Spain, and the 1996 Summer Olympics in Atlanta, Georgia, US. He also won a Silver medal for baseball in Sydney, Australia during the 2000 Summer Olympics.

Ulacia played for the Cuban national team in the 1999 Baltimore Orioles–Cuba national baseball team exhibition series which took place in Havana and Baltimore, Maryland, US. He was also a member of the Cuban team that won the gold medal at the Baseball World Cup in 1986, 1988, 1990, and 2001. His team also won a gold medal at the Pan American Games in 1987, 1991, 1995, and 1999; the 1990 Goodwill Games; and the Central American and Caribbean Games in 1990 and 1993.

Ulacia retired from baseball for health reasons. He then coached baseball with the Amateur League of Japan. He returned to Puerto Rico and was the manager of Camaguey baseball team.
