= 1998 Baseball World Cup =

International Men's amateur baseball tournament

Tournament details
- Country: Italy
- Dates: 21 July – 2 August
- Teams: 16

Final positions
- Champions: Cuba (22nd title)
- Runners-up: South Korea
- Third place: Nicaragua
- Fourth place: Italy

Tournament statistics
- Games played: 68

Awards
- MVP: (Cuba) Antonio Pacheco

The 1998 Baseball World Cup (BWC) was the 33rd international Men's amateur baseball tournament. The tournament was sanctioned by the International Baseball Federation, which titled it the Amateur World Series from the 1938 tournament through the 1986 AWS. The tournament was held, for the third time, in Italy, from July 21 to August 2. The final was a repeat of the previous BWC tournament, with Cuba again defeating South Korea in the final, winning its 22nd title.

There were 16 participating countries, split into two groups, with the first four of each group qualifying for the finals.

This was the first edition of the tournament that allowed professional players to take part in the competition.

The next six competitions were also held as the BWC tournament, which was replaced in 2015 by the quadrennial WBSC Premier12.

== Stadiums ==
- Stadio Steno Borghese
- Stadio Primo Nebiolo

== First round ==
=== Pool A ===
Pos	Team	W	L	RS	RA
1	Cuba	7	0	84	10
2	Japan	6	1	46	20
3	Dominican Republic	5	2	56	35
4	Italy	3	4	33	64
5	Panama	3	4	39	36
6	China	2	5	20	38
7	Spain	2	5	35	67
8	South Africa	0	7	12	55

=== Pool B ===
Pos	Team	W	L	RS	RA
1	Australia	5	2	48	32
2	Nicaragua	5	2	69	34
3	South Korea	4	3	35	26
4	Netherlands	4	3	45	49
5	United States	4	3	38	28
6	Canada	3	4	27	31
7	Chinese Taipei	3	4	36	35
8	Russia	0	7	12	75

== Final round ==
Quarter-finals
Cuba	12
Netherlands	1
Nicaragua	12
Dominican Republic	4
Japan	5
South Korea	8
Australia	8
Italy	9

Semi-finals
Cuba	14
Nicaragua	2
South Korea	8
Italy	2

Final
Cuba	7
South Korea	1
Third place
Nicaragua	5
Italy	1

5th–8th place
Netherlands	7
Dominican Republic	3
Japan	11
Australia	6

Fifth place
Netherlands	3
Japan	9
Seventh place
Dominican Republic	2
Australia	9

== Final standings ==
Pos	Team	W	L
	Cuba	10	0
	South Korea	6	4
	Nicaragua	7	3
4	Italy	4	6
5	Japan	8	2
6	Netherlands	5	5
7	Australia	6	4
8	Dominican Republic	5	5
9	United States	4	3
10	Panama	3	4
11	Canada	3	4
12	Chinese Taipei	3	4
13	China	2	5
14	Spain	2	5
15	South Africa	0	7
16	Russia	0	7

== Awards ==
Tournament Awards
Award	Player
MVP	(Cuba) Antonio Pacheco
Leading hitter	(Cuba) Orestes Kindelán
Pitcher with best ERA	(Cuba) José Contreras
Pitcher with best win/loss average	(Japan) Eiji Yano
Most Runs batted in	(Cuba) Antonio Pacheco
Most Home runs	(Chinese Taipei) Chin-Feng Chen
Most Stolen bases	(Italy) Davide Rigoli
Most Runs scored	(Cuba) Robelquis Videaux
Outstanding defensive player	(South Korea) Hwang Woo-Gu

All Star Team
Position	Player
Pitchers	(Cuba) Yovany Aragón
Pitchers	(Netherlands) Jurlaan Lobbezoo
Catcher	(Cuba) Juan Manrique
First base	(Cuba) Loidel Chapellí
Second base	(Cuba) Antonio Pacheco
Third base	(Cuba) Omar Linares
Shortstop	(Nicaragua) Edgard López
Outfield	(Cuba) Oscar Machado
Outfield	(Chinese Taipei) Chen Chih-yuan
Outfield	(Cuba) Robelquis Videaux
Designated hitter	(Cuba) Orestes Kindelán
