= Baseball at the 1991 Pan American Games =

- Venue: Havana, Cuba
- Competitors: 9 teams

Medalists
Gold medal	Cuba
Silver medal	Puerto Rico
Bronze medal	United States

Baseball at the 1991 Pan American Games was contested between teams representing Aruba, Canada, Cuba, Dominican Republic, Mexico, Netherlands Antilles, Nicaragua, Puerto Rico, and the United States. The 1991 edition was the 11th Pan American Games, and was hosted by Havana.

Cuba entered the competition as the five-time defending champions, having won each gold medal dating back to 1971. They successfully defended their title, with Puerto Rico finishing second.

== Medal summary ==
=== Medal table ===
Rank	Nation	Gold	Silver	Bronze	Total
1	Cuba	1	0	0	1
2	Puerto Rico	0	1	0	1
3	United States	0	0	1	1
Totals (3 entries)		1	1	1	3

=== Medalists ===
Event	Gold	Silver	Bronze
Men's	Cuba: Pedro Luis Rodríguez; Alberto Hernández; José Raúl Delgado; Lourdes Gourriel; Antonio Pacheco; Omar Linares; Lázaro Vargas; Germán Mesa; Luis Ulacia; Víctor Mesa; Orestes Kindelán; Ermidelio Urrutia; Romelio Martínez; Jorge Luis Valdés; Euclides Rojas; Osvaldo Fernández Guerra; Osvaldo Fernández Rodríguez; Osvaldo Duvergel; Leonardo Tamayo; Omar Ajete	Puerto Rico: José Lorenzana; Efrain Nieves Sr.; Efraín García; Roberto Lopez; Luis Ramos; Abimael Rosario; Manuel Serrano; Ernest Martinez; Angel A. Morales; Albert Bracero; Jorge Aranzamendi; Jesus I. Feliciano; Wilfredo Velez; Francisco Hernaiz; Jimmy Figueroa; Ariel Robles; Josue Salva; Rafael Santiago; Angel Fonseca; Armando Ríos	United States: John Dettmer; Todd Greene; Jason Giambi; Chris Gomez; Jeff Granger; Jeffrey Hammonds; Charles Johnson; Todd Johnson; Rick Helling; Dan Melendez; Craig Wilson; Tony Phillips; Chris Roberts; Steve Rodriguez; Paul Shuey; Kennie Steenstra; Todd Taylor; David Tuttle; Jeff Ware; Chris Wimmer
