= Mike Fiore =

Mike Fiore may refer to:

- Mike Fiore (baseball, born 1944), first baseman in Major League Baseball
- Mike Fiore (baseball, born 1966), American amateur and professional baseball player

== See also ==
- Michele Fiore (born 1970), American politician in Nevada
