= Germán Mesa =

Cuban baseball player

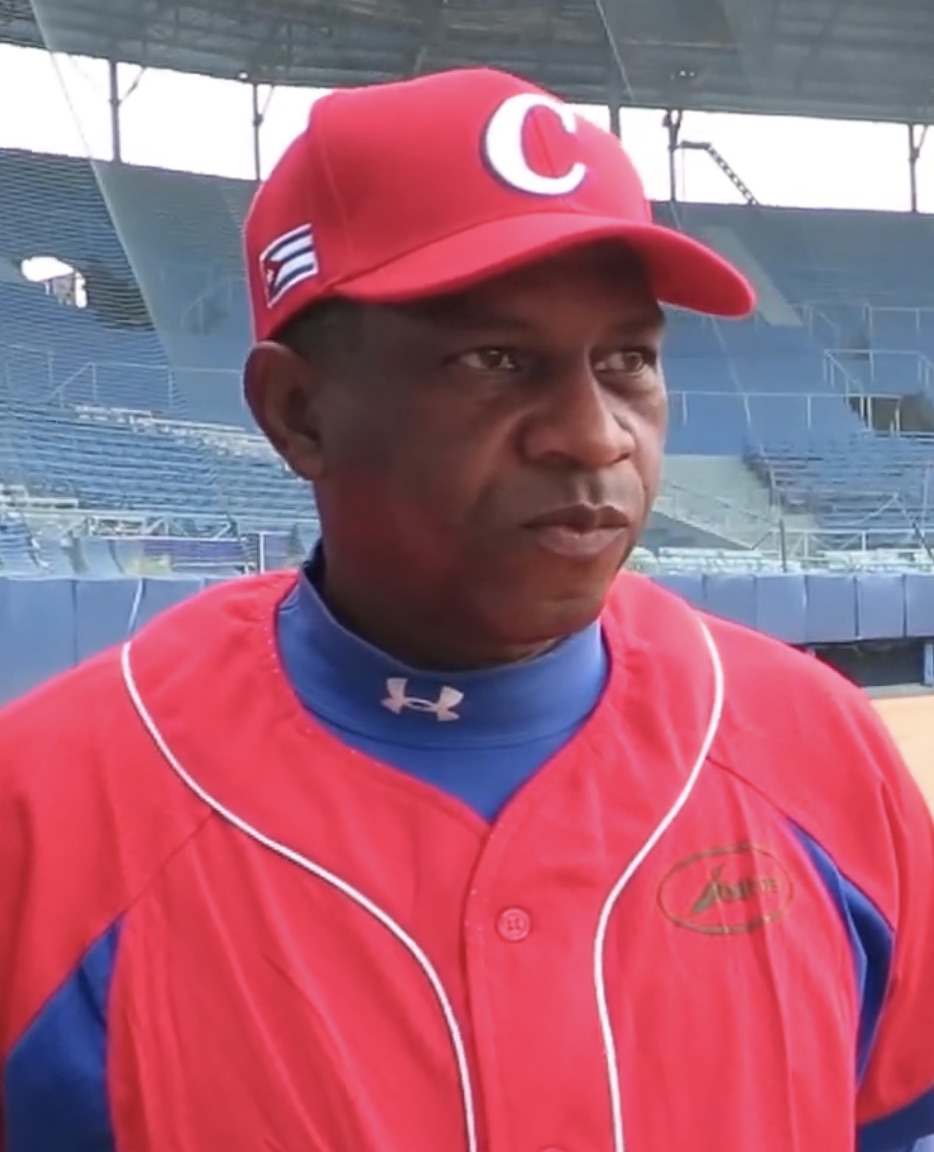
- Mesa in 2021
- Shortstop / Manager
- Born: May 12, 1967 (age 59); Havana, Cuba
- Bats: Right Throws: Right

SNB statistics
- Batting Average: .285
- Home runs: 112
- Runs batted in: 527

Teams
- Industriales (1985–2002)
Medals
Men's baseball
Representing Cuba
Olympic Games
| Gold medal – first place | 1992 Barcelona | Team |
| Silver medal – second place | 2000 Sydney | Team |
Pan American Games
| Gold medal – first place | 1991 Havana | Team |
| Gold medal – first place | 1995 Mar del Plata | Team |
| Gold medal – first place | 1999 Winnipeg | Team |
Baseball World Cup
| Gold medal – first place | 1990 Edmonton | Team |
| Gold medal – first place | 1994 Managua | Team |
Central American and Caribbean Games
| Gold medal – first place | 1990 Mexico | Team |
Goodwill Games
| Gold medal – first place | 1990 Seattle | Team |
Manager for El Salvador
Central American Games
| Bronze medal – third place | 2017 Managua | Team |

Germán Mesa Fresneda (born May 12, 1967, in Havana) is a Cuban baseball manager and former player. A shortstop who played for the Industriales of the Cuban National Series and for the Cuba national baseball team, Mesa was known as "El Imán" ("The Magnet") for his superior fielding skills, compared by international scouts to the likes of major leaguers Ozzie Smith and Omar Vizquel. He was also an exceptional hitter and base runner who led Cuban baseball in hits, triples, and stolen bases during his career. He has managed in the National Series, and was named skipper of the Cuban national team for the 2026 World Baseball Classic.

== Playing career ==
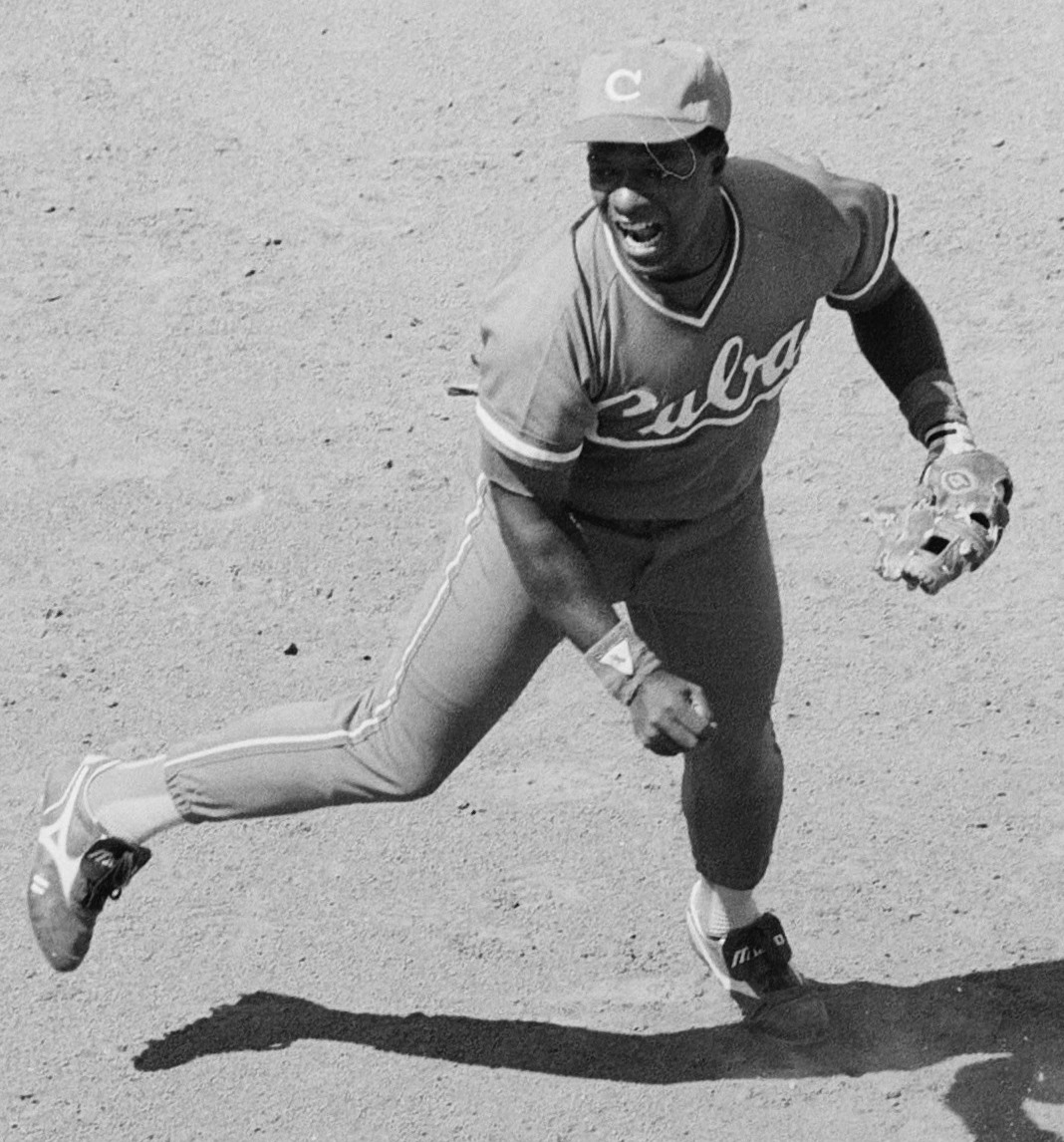
Mesa at the 1990 Haarlem Baseball Week

Mesa played his entire Cuban National Series career with Industriales. He led the league in stolen bases three times (1988, 1989, and 1991). In the Selective Series, a summer-schedule competition, he led in hits in 1988, runs in 1993, and triples in 1988.

In Olympic competition, he won a gold medal with the Cuban national team at the 1992 Barcelona Olympics. However, he was dropped from Cuba's roster before the 1996 Olympics, to be held in Atlanta, replaced at shortstop by Eduardo Paret.

In October 1996, less than two months after missing the Olympics, Mesa was banned from Cuban baseball, along with Orlando Hernández and Alberto Hernández (no relation), for allegedly taking money from an American sports agent. While the other two players defected, Mesa elected to remain in Cuba. His suspension was lifted in March 1998, and he returned to play for Industriales at the beginning of the 1998–99 Cuban National Series.

Mesa won another silver Olympic medal with Cuba at the 2000 Sydney Games. He retired in 2002, and eventually became a trainer for the national team.

== Coaching career ==
After his retirement, Mesa managed Industriales from 2008 to 2011, leading them to a championship in 2010. He has also managed in the Nicaraguan Professional Baseball League, winning three titles — two with the Gigantes de Rivas (2016, 2024) and one with the Tigres de Chinandega (2013).

Mesa managed the El Salvador national team at the 2017 Central American and Bolivarian Games. He was a bench coach with the Cuban national team at the 2023 World Baseball Classic, where the team finished fourth.

On June 18, 2025, the Baseball Federation of Cuba announced that Mesa would manage the Cuban national team at the 2026 World Baseball Classic, replacing Armando Johnson. Mesa's selection was controversial, with critics pointing to his opposition to including defectors in National Series tournaments; one commentator described his selection as "possibly the worst thing that has happened to Cuban baseball in its history." Mesa was also named Cuba's manager for the 2025 Copa América in Panama, though the tournament was ultimately cancelled. He made his debut as national team manager at the 2026 Serie de las Américas.

== Bibliography ==
- Evans, Hilary; Gjerde, Arild; Heijmans, Jeroen; Mallon, Bill; et al. "Germán Mesa". Olympics at Sports-Reference.com. Sports Reference LLC. Archived from the original on 2012-01-27.
