= Omar Ajete =

Cuban baseball player

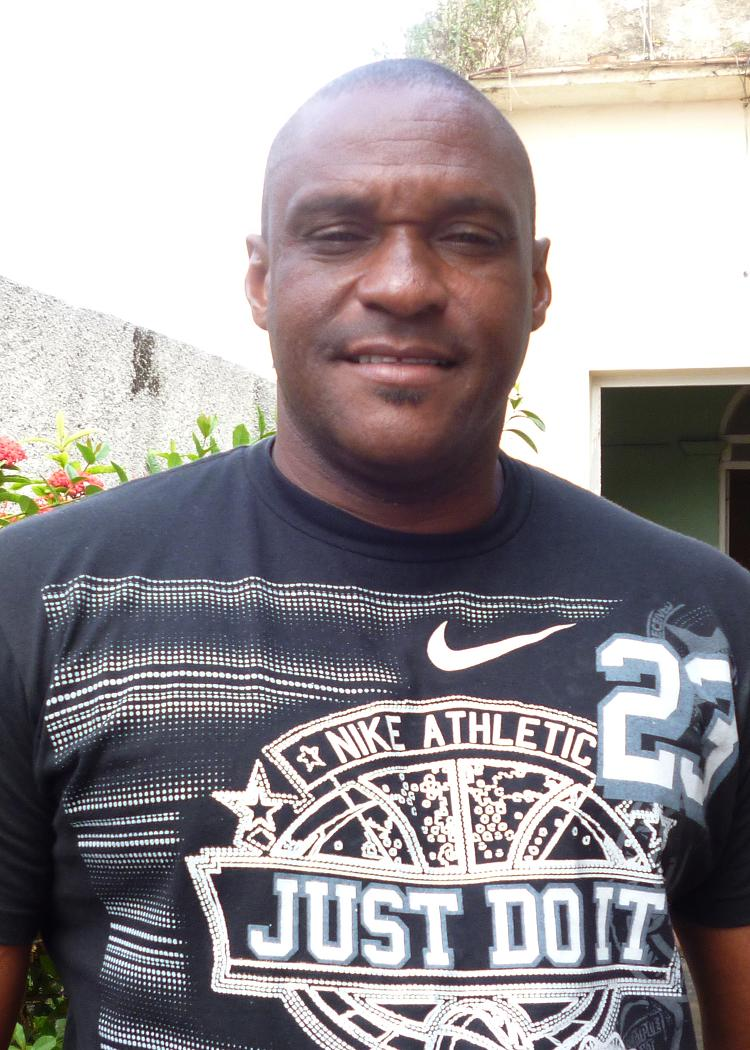
- Pitcher
- Born: July 31, 1965 (age 61); San Juan, Pinar del Río, Cuba
Medals
Men's baseball
Representing Cuba
Olympic Games
Gold medal – first place	1992 Barcelona	Team
Gold medal – first place	1996 Atlanta	Team
Silver medal – second place	2000 Sydney	Team
Pan American Games
Gold medal – first place	1987 Indianapolis	Team
Gold medal – first place	1991 Havana	Team
Gold medal – first place	1995 Mar del Plata	Team
Central American and Caribbean Games
Gold medal – first place	1990 Mexico	Team
Gold medal – first place	1993 Ponce	Team
Baseball World Cup
Gold medal – first place	1990 Edmonton	Team
Goodwill Games
Gold medal – first place	1990 Seattle	Team

Omar Ajete Iglesias (born 31 July 1965) is a Cuban former baseball pitcher who starred for Pinar del Río of the Cuban National Series, and the Cuban national team.

== Career ==
Ajete was born on 31 July 1965 in San Juan in the Cuban province of Pinar del Río. He started practicing baseball when he was 13 years old. Ajete initially played center field but switched positions and played as pitcher in a youth province championship.

Ajete, a left-handed starter, made his debut in the Cuban National Series in 1984 with the Pinar del Río team and compiled a career record of 179–96 over sixteen 90-game seasons in the National Series, from 1984 to 2001, winning four championships in 1985, 1988, 1997 and 1998. He pitched for Cuba national baseball team at the 1992, 1996 and 2000 Olympic games, earning two gold medals, in 1992 and 1996 and a silver medal in 2000. After the 2000–01 season, Ajete retired from baseball.
