= Antonio Pacheco (baseball) =

Cuban baseball player

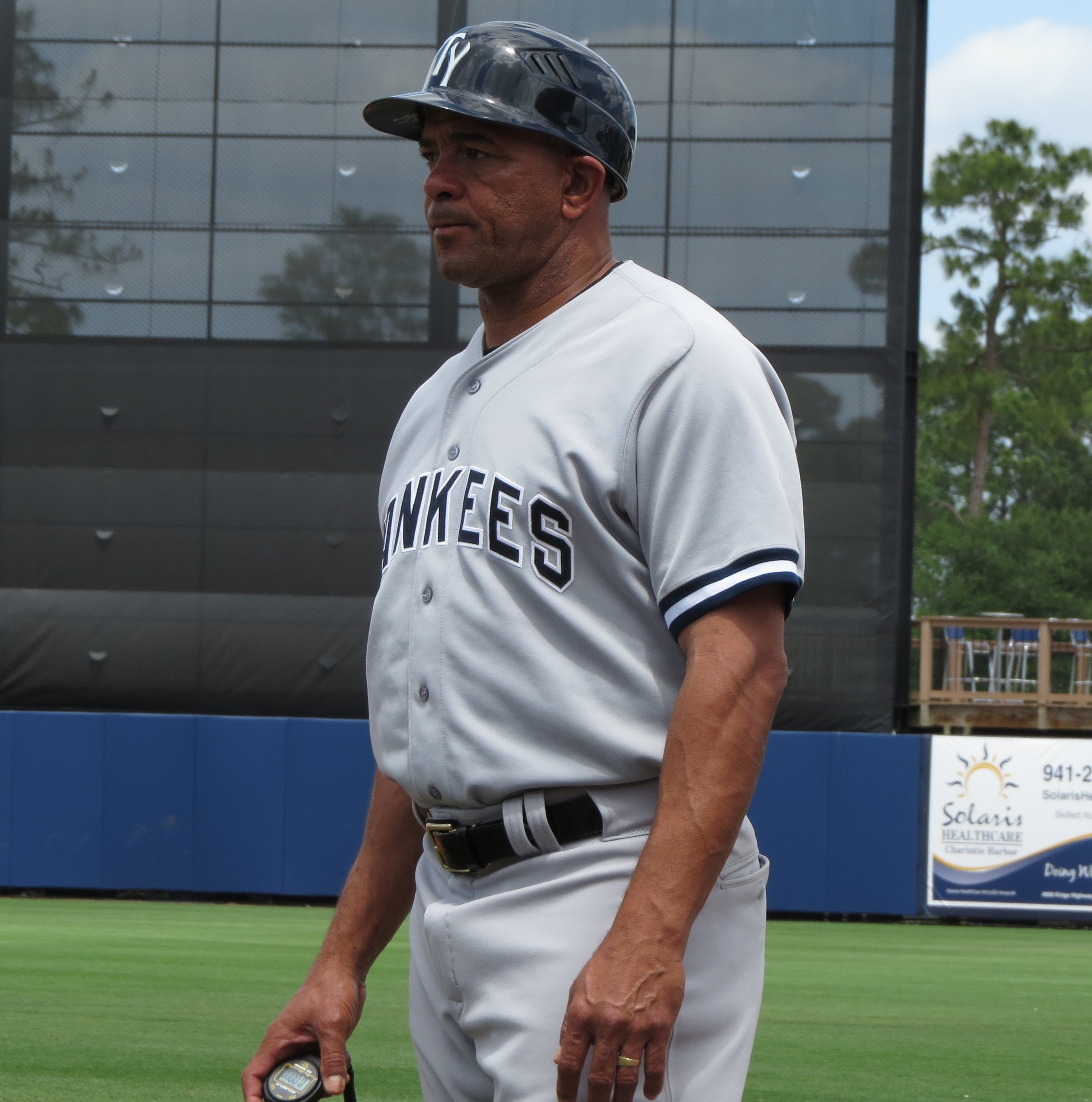
- Pacheco with the Tampa Yankees
- Infielder / Manager
- Born: 4 June 1964; Santiago, Cuba
- Bats: Right Throws: Right

Career highlights and awards
- Baseball World Cup MVP (1998)
Medals
Men's baseball
Representing Cuba
Olympic Games
Gold medal – first place	1992 Barcelona	Team
Gold medal – first place	1996 Atlanta	Team
Silver medal – second place	2000 Sydney	Team
Baseball World Cup
Gold medal – first place	1984 Havana	Team
Gold medal – first place	1986 Holland	Team
Gold medal – first place	1988 Italy	Team
Gold medal – first place	1990 Edmonton	Team
Gold medal – first place	1994 Nicaragua	Team
Gold medal – first place	1998 Italy	Team
Gold medal – first place	2001 Taipei	Team
Intercontinental Cup
Gold medal – first place	1983 Brussels	Team
Gold medal – first place	1985 Edmonton	Team
Gold medal – first place	1987 Havana	Team
Gold medal – first place	1989 San Juan	Team
Silver medal – second place	1997 Barcelona	Team
Pan American Games
Gold medal – first place	1983 Caracas	Team
Gold medal – first place	1987 Indianapolis	Team
Gold medal – first place	1991 Havana	Team
Gold medal – first place	1995 Mar del Plata	Team
Central American and Caribbean Games
Gold medal – first place	1986 Santiago de los Caballeros	Team
Gold medal – first place	1990 Mexico City	Team
Gold medal – first place	1993 Ponce	Team
Gold medal – first place	1998 Maracaibo	Team
Goodwill Games
Gold medal – first place	1990 Seattle	Team

Antonio Pacheco Massó (born 4 June 1964) is a Cuban former baseball player. He played most of his career as a second baseman with the Santiago de Cuba of the Cuban National Series, and was a frequent member of the Cuba national baseball team, as a 3 times Olympic medalist. Pacheco has been a baseball instructor in the New York Yankees farm system since 2014.

== Career ==
He played for Japanese corporate team Shidax between 2002 and 2004.

At the end of his playing career in the National Series, he had posted a career batting average of .334, and held the record for career hits (2,356, since broken). He also collected 1,304 RBI, 1,258 runs, 366 doubles, 284 home runs and 63 triples.

After his retirement as a player, Pacheco returned to manage Santiago, leading the team to an upset in the 2004–05 Cuban National Series.

He coached the Cuba national baseball team to a silver medal at the 2008 Summer Olympics.

In 2026, Pacheco was named as a defensive coach for the FCL Yankees the rookie-level affiliate of the New York Yankees.
