= Jim Poole (pitcher) =

American baseball player (1966–2023)

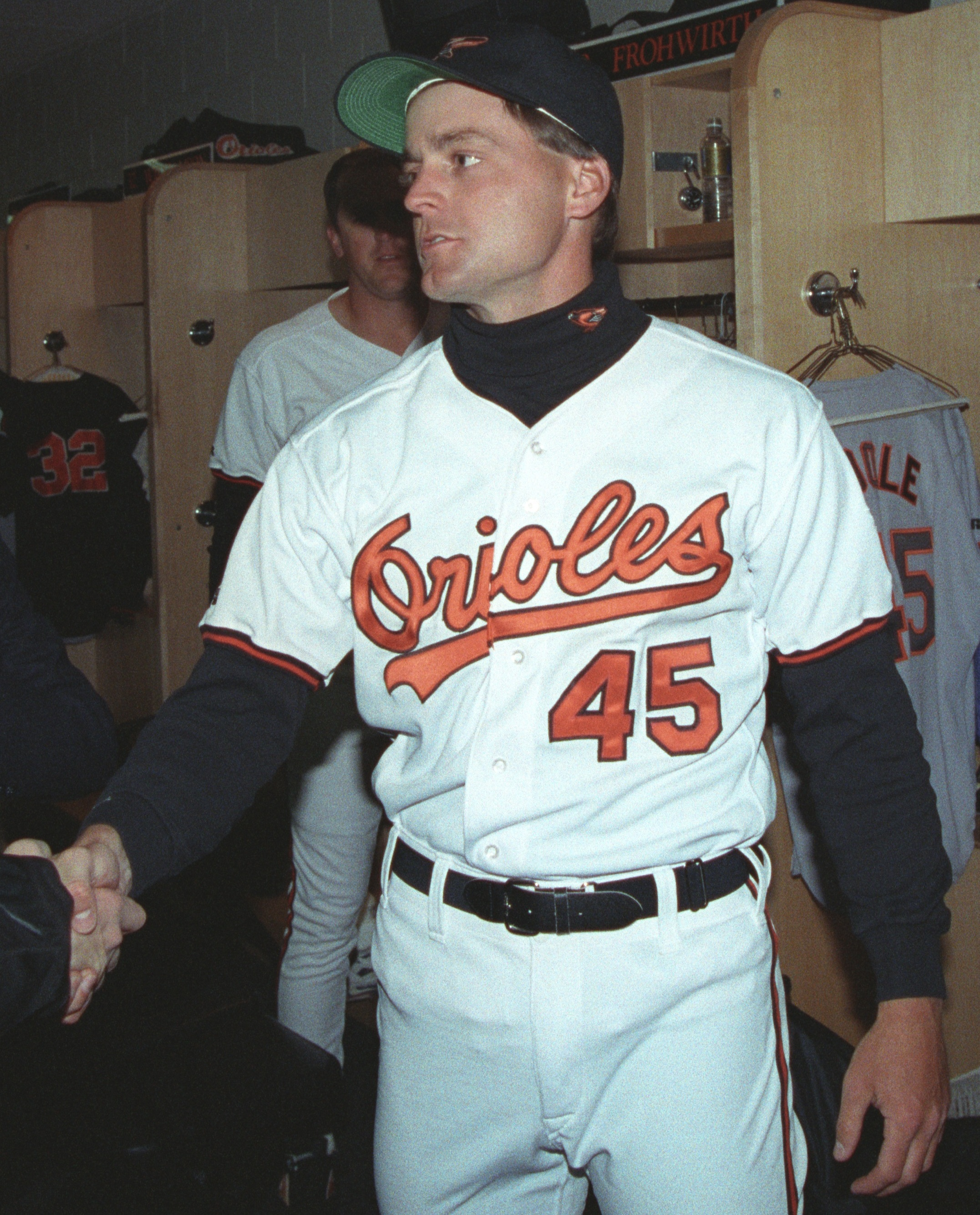
- Poole with the Baltimore Orioles in 1993
- Pitcher
- Born: April 28, 1966; Rochester, New York, U.S.
- Died: October 6, 2023 (aged 57); Alpharetta, Georgia, U.S.
- Batted: Left Threw: Left

MLB debut
- June 15, 1990, for the Los Angeles Dodgers

Last MLB appearance
- June 1, 2000, for the Montreal Expos

MLB statistics
- Win–loss record: 22–12
- Earned run average: 4.31
- Strikeouts: 256
- Stats at Baseball Reference

Teams
- Los Angeles Dodgers (1990); Texas Rangers (1991); Baltimore Orioles (1991–1994); Cleveland Indians (1995–1996); San Francisco Giants (1996–1998); Cleveland Indians (1998); Philadelphia Phillies (1999); Cleveland Indians (1999); Detroit Tigers (2000); Montreal Expos (2000)
Medals
Baseball
Representing United States
Pan American Games
Silver medal – second place	1987 Indianapolis	Team

James Richard Poole (April 28, 1966 – October 6, 2023) was an American pitcher in Major League Baseball (MLB) who was a relief pitcher from 1990 through 2000. He appeared in the 1995 World Series with the Cleveland Indians. He was a member of the United States national team which won the silver medal in baseball at the 1987 Pan American Games, and was inducted into the Georgia Tech Sports Hall of Fame in 1997.

== Early life ==
James Richard Poole was born on April 28, 1966, in Rochester, New York. He attended La Salle College High School in Wyndmoor, Pennsylvania, then pitched for the Georgia Tech baseball team from 1985 to 1988. Playing for Georgia Tech, he was part of the team which won four consecutive Atlantic Coast Conference baseball tournament championships. During four seasons, he pitched in 120 games, struck out 263 batters in 188 innings, and set the team's record for career saves with 22. He was named all-Atlantic Coast Conference honors his last two seasons.

Poole was a member of the United States national baseball team which won the silver medal in Baseball at the 1987 Pan American Games. He was drafted by the Los Angeles Dodgers in the 34th round of the 1987 Major League Baseball draft.

== Career ==
Poole played three seasons of minor league baseball with the Dodgers' farm system, including the Vero Beach Dodgers from 1988 to 1989, the Bakersfield Dodgers in 1989, and the San Antonio Missions in 1990.

Poole was traded from the Los Angeles Dodgers to the Texas Rangers for minor-league pitchers Steve Allen and David Lynch and cash on December 29. 1990. He was designated for assignment by the Rangers on May 26, 1991, and claimed off waivers by the Baltimore Orioles five days later on May 31. He was the final Orioles winning pitcher at Memorial Stadium in a 7–3 victory over the Detroit Tigers in the penultimate MLB game ever at that ballpark on October 5, 1991. He became a free agent for the first time when the Orioles declined to offer him a contract on December 23, 1994, amid a players strike. He had been the Orioles' alternate players representative and a member of the Major League Baseball Players Association's pension committee.

Poole was signed as a free agent by the Cleveland Indians on four occasions: March 18, 1995; July 22, 1998; August 26, 1999; and June 9, 2000. He appeared twice with the Indians in the 1995 World Series, both losses to the Atlanta Braves at Atlanta–Fulton County Stadium. He retired all three batters faced in the seventh inning of Game 2. He was the losing pitcher in the decisive Game 6, giving up the only run of the contest. He relieved starting pitcher Dennis Martínez with Mark Lemke at second, Chipper Jones at first and two outs in the fifth and struck out Fred McGriff on three pitches. The next batter Poole faced to start the bottom of the sixth was David Justice who, with a 1–1 count, hit a high-and inside fastball for a home run over the right-field fence. Poole said after the series-ending loss, "It was a pitch that was supposed to be down and away, and it was up and in. If I don't throw that pitch, we're still playing." Prior to the homer in the top of the sixth, he had his first MLB at bat in which he fouled out to McGriff in an unsuccessful attempt to bunt over to second Tony Peña who had led off the inning with the Indians' only hit of the game.

Poole was acquired along with cash by the San Francisco Giants from the Indians for Mark Carreon on July 9, 1996. He had pitched 26 2/3 innings in 32 games with a 4–0 record and a 3.04 earned run average (ERA) prior to the trade. The Giants addressed a need for left-handed pitchers at the time of the transaction. He played the next two seasons with the Giants, before his release in July 1998. He signed as a free agent with the Cleveland Indians for the remainder of the 1998 season. Beginning the 1999 season with the Philadelphia Phillies, he was released in August and completed the season with the Cleveland Indians. In the 2000 season, Poole appeared in 23 games combined with the Detroit Tigers and Montreal Expos.

=== Honors and awards ===
Poole was inducted into the Georgia Tech Sports Hall of Fame in 1997.

== Later life ==
Following retirement at the end of the 2000 season, Poole was a fundraiser and supporter of the Alexander Tharpe Fund for the Georgia Tech baseball program. In 2010, he began serving as the pitching coach at Johns Creek High School in Fulton County, Georgia. He subsequently worked as an advisor for the Baseball Division of BIP Wealth.

In 2021, Poole was diagnosed with amyotrophic lateral sclerosis (ALS). After his diagnosis, he worked to raise awareness for ALS with the Major League Baseball ALS board and Georgia Tech.

Poole died from ALS at age 57 on October 6, 2023, in Alpharetta, Georgia.
