= Larry Gonzales (baseball) =

American baseball player (born 1967)

- Catcher
- Born: March 28, 1967 (age 59); West Covina, California, U.S.
- Batted: Right Threw: Right

MLB debut
- June 13, 1993, for the California Angels

Last MLB appearance
- June 17, 1993, for the California Angels

MLB statistics
- Batting average: .500
- Home runs: 0
- Runs batted in: 1
- Stats at Baseball Reference

Teams
- California Angels (1993)
Medals
Baseball
Representing United States
Pan American Games
Silver medal – second place	1987 Indianapolis	Team

Lawrence Christopher Gonzales (born March 28, 1967) is an American former professional baseball player who played one season for the California Angels of Major League Baseball (MLB).

Larry grew up in West Covina (Ca) and attended Edgewood High School where he played football and baseball. He attended the University of Hawaii from 1986 thru 1988. He was a member of the 1987 USA baseball team which won a silver medal in the 1987 Pan American Games.

Larry has worked for Kingston Technology Co. (www.kingston.com) since 1996 where he is currently the Vice President of Administration.
