= Chris Nichting =

American baseball player (born 1966)

- Pitcher
- Born: May 13, 1966 (age 60); Cincinnati, Ohio, U.S.
- Batted: Right Threw: Right

MLB debut
- May 15, 1995, for the Texas Rangers

Last MLB appearance
- July 2, 2002, for the Colorado Rockies

MLB statistics
- Win–loss record: 1–4
- Earned run average: 5.22
- Strikeouts: 78
- Stats at Baseball Reference

Teams
- Texas Rangers (1995); Cleveland Indians (2000); Cincinnati Reds (2001); Colorado Rockies (2001–2002)
Medals
Baseball
Representing United States
Pan American Games
Silver medal – second place	1987 Indianapolis	Team

Christopher Thomas Nichting (born May 13, 1966) is an American former professional baseball player. A pitcher, Nichting played for the Texas Rangers, Cleveland Indians, Cincinnati Reds, and Colorado Rockies of Major League Baseball (MLB). Nichting is an alumnus of Elder High School in Cincinnati.
