= Rick Hirtensteiner =

American baseball player and coach (born 1967)

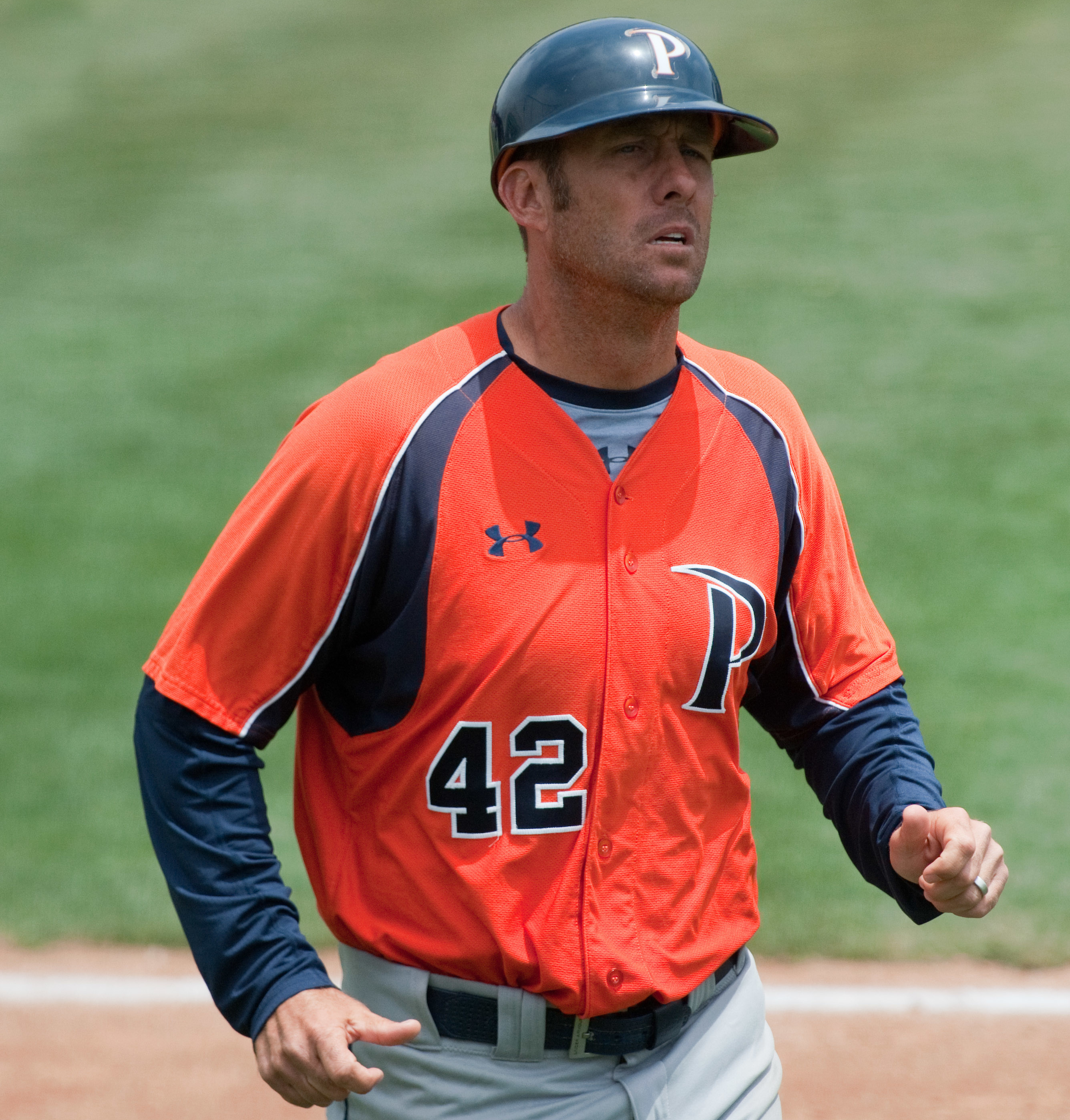
- Hirtensteiner with Pepperdine in 2010

Current position
- Title: Head coach
- Team: Oaks Christian Lions
- Record: 0–0

Biographical details
- Born: October 9, 1967 (age 59); Riverside, California, U.S.

Playing career
- 1986–1989: Pepperdine
- 1989: Bend Bucks
- 1989: Palm Springs Angels
- 1990: Quad Cities Angels
- 1991: Salt Lake City Trappers
- 1992: Harrisburg Senators
- 1993: Ottawa Lynx
- 1993: St. Paul Saints
- 1994: Brevard County Manatees
- 1994: Portland Sea Dogs
- Position: Outfielder

Coaching career (HC unless noted)
- 1996–1997: Lamar (Asst)
- 1998–2015: Pepperdine (Asst)
- 2016–2024: Pepperdine
- 2025–present: Oaks Christian School

Head coaching record
- Overall: 194–226
- Tournaments: WCC: 3–5; NCAA: 0–0

Accomplishments and honors

Championships
- West Coast (2018)

Awards
- West Coast Conference Player of the Year (1989); College Baseball All-American (1989); West Coast Conference Coach of the Year (2018)
Medal record
Baseball
Representing United States
Pan American Games
Silver medal – second place	1987 Indianapolis	Team
World Junior Baseball Championship
Silver medal – second place	1985 Albany	Team

Richard Scott Hirtensteiner (born October 9, 1967) is the head coach for the Oaks Christian School baseball team. He was previously the head coach for the Pepperdine Waves baseball team from 2016 to 2024. He previously played at Pepperdine for four years, earning All-American honors in 1989. In 1987, he represented the United States in the Pan American Games. From 1989 to 1994, he played professionally.

== Playing career ==
In 877 at-bats at Pepperdine, he hit .336 with 27 home runs and 176 RBI. In his All-American senior year, he slashed .366/.469/.620 with 12 home runs, 41 RBI and 13 steals. In the 1987 Pan American Games, he batted .409. In 1988, he played collegiate summer baseball with the Harwich Mariners of the Cape Cod Baseball League (CCBL) and was named a league all-star.

He was drafted three times, last by the California Angels in the 8th round of the 1989 Major League Baseball draft. He played in the Angels system through 1990 before joining the unaffiliated Salt Lake City Trappers in 1991. With them, he hit .356 with 11 home runs and 20 RBI in 70 games. He joined the Montreal Expos system in 1992, played briefly at Triple-A in 1993 (spending most of the year in the independent ranks) and finished his career in the Florida Marlins system in 1994.

== Coaching career ==
He later became an assistant coach at Lamar University before joining Pepperdine as an assistant. In 1998, he returned to the CCBL as an assistant coach for the Yarmouth–Dennis Red Sox He became Pepperdine's head coach in 2015.

On August 1, 2024, Hirtensteiner was named the head coach of the Oaks Christian School baseball team.

== Head coaching record ==
=== College ===
Record table
Season	Team	Overall	Conference	Standing	Postseason
Pepperdine Waves (West Coast Conference) (2016–2024)
2016	Pepperdine	29–24	16–11	4th	West Coast Tournament
2017	Pepperdine	20–32	8–19	8th	
2018	Pepperdine	31–24	17–10	1st	West Coast Tournament
2019	Pepperdine	24–24	14–13	T-6th	
2020	Pepperdine	12–3	0–0		Season canceled due to COVID-19
2021	Pepperdine	20–25	12–15	7th	
2022	Pepperdine	24–26	12–15	7th	
2023	Pepperdine	19–30	8–19	T–8th	
2024	Pepperdine	15–38	9–15	T–6th	West Coast Tournament
Pepperdine:		194–226	96–117		
Total:		194–226			
National champion Postseason invitational champion Conference regular season champion Conference regular season and conference tournament champion Division regular season champion Division regular season and conference tournament champion Conference tournament champion

=== High school ===
Record table
Season	Team	Overall	Conference	Standing	Postseason
Oaks Christian Lions () (2025–present)
2025	Oaks Christian	0–0	0–0		
Oaks Christian:		0–0	0–0		
Total:		0–0			
National champion Postseason invitational champion Conference regular season champion Conference regular season and conference tournament champion Division regular season champion Division regular season and conference tournament champion Conference tournament champion
