= Steve Hecht =

American baseball player and coach

Seattle Mariners – No. 86
- Utility player/Coach
- Born: November 12, 1965 (age 60); Palm Springs, California, U.S.
- Bats: Left Throws: Right

Teams
- As Coach: Texas Rangers (2005–2008); Seattle Mariners (2009–present)
Medals
Men's baseball
Representing United States
Pan American Games
Silver medal – second place	1987 Indianapolis	Team

Steve James Hecht (born November 12, 1965, in Palm Springs, California) is an American performance coach for the Seattle Mariners. His job is to focus on mental training. Hecht spent three years as the Texas Rangers' performance coach.

He previously played in the Minor Leagues and has a degree in psychology.

== Playing career ==
He previously played in the San Francisco Giants organization, the Montreal Expos organization, the Texas Rangers organization and the Detroit Tigers organization. He played one season at the Short-season level, two seasons at the Class-A level, four seasons at the Double-A level and six season at the Triple-A level.

In eight professional seasons he batted .273 with 721 hits, 116 doubles, 49 triples and 31 home runs in 807 games.

== Coaching career ==
=== Texas Rangers ===
In 2005 Hecht was hired as the Rangers' performance coach. His task was to focus on the players mental health. He held that position until 2009

=== Seattle Mariners ===
Hecht was hired by the Mariners in 2009 to be the performance coach. He now is a performance coach for the Baltimore Orioles since 2013 per his LinkedIn.
