= Giraldo González =

Cuban baseball player (1958–2021)

Giraldo Arango González (29 May 1958 – 28 August 2021) was a Cuban baseball player and coach.

== Biography ==
Born in Los Palacios, González made his debut in the XVIII Cuban National Series, 1978-1979, as a shortstop for Vegueros de Pinar del Río. He remained with the Vegueros for fifteen years.

He participated in national and international events such as Copa José Antonio Huelga, 1982 Central American and Caribbean Games, 1987 Pan American Games, Intercontinental Cup Baseball 1987 and others.

Giraldo González died on 28 August 2021, after contracting COVID-19. He was 63 years old.
