= Mike Fiore (baseball, born 1966) =

American baseball player (born 1966)

- Outfielder
- Born: May 4, 1966 (age 60); Atlantic City, New Jersey, U.S.
- Bats: Right Throws: Right
- Stats at Baseball Reference

Member of the National College

Baseball Hall of Fame
- Induction: 2014
Medals
Baseball
Representing the United States
Olympic Games
Gold medal – first place	1988 Seoul	Team
Pan American Games
Silver medal – second place	1987 Indianapolis	Team
Baseball World Cup
Silver medal – second place	1988 Rome	Team

Michael Thomas Fiore (born May 4, 1966) is an American amateur and professional baseball player. An outfielder, first baseman, third baseman, and designated hitter, he batted from the right side and threw with his right hand.

== Baseball career ==
=== Amateur ===
Fiore played college baseball for the University of Miami And made an immediate impact upon arrival. He helped guide the Hurricanes to a national championship victory in the 1985 College World Series as a freshman. He picked up Baseball America Freshman All-America honors after batting .330 with 46 RBIs and 11 doubles.

Fiore was the school's lone representative on the All-Tournament team at the 1986 College World Series, where Miami was eliminated in the 14th game.

In 1987, Fiore batted a staggering .423 to win the inaugural Dick Howser Trophy. He was ultimately inducted into the University of Miami Sports Hall of Fame.

As a senior in 1988, he earned first-team All-America honors from both Baseball America and the American Baseball Coaches Association (ABCA), hitting .360 with 15 home runs and 83 RBIs. Remarkably, Fiore reached the College World Series in all four seasons of his collegiate career.

He won a silver medal as a member of the United States national baseball team at the 1987 Pan American Games and remained a member of the national team in 1988, representing the United States at the 1988 Summer Olympics, where America won a gold medal (unofficial due to the competition's status as a demonstration sport), and the 1988 Baseball World Cup, where he won a silver medal and was recognized as the designated hitter on the tournament's All Star Team.

Fiore was also one of nine finalists for the Golden Spikes Award that year, which was awarded to Robin Ventura of Oklahoma State University.

Mike was inducted into the University of Miami Sports Hall of Fame in 2000.

=== Professional ===
The St. Louis Cardinals selected Fiore in the 15th round of the 1988 Major League Baseball draft, but he never reached the major leagues. He played for the class A Springfield Cardinals in 1989, the advanced class A St. Petersburg Cardinals in 1990, and the class AA Arkansas Travelers in 1991.

=== Post-playing career ===
After his retirement as a player, he worked for USA Baseball, eventually advancing to the position of general manager. He later joined the staff of sports agent Scott Boras, who had been Fiore's representative during his playing career.
