= 1994 Baseball World Cup =

32nd Baseball World Cup hosted in Nicaragua

Tournament details
- Country: Nicaragua
- Dates: 3–14 August
- Teams: 16

Final positions
- Champions: Cuba (21st title)
- Runners-up: South Korea
- Third place: Japan
- Fourth place: Nicaragua

Tournament statistics
- Games played: 64

The 1994 Baseball World Cup (BWC) was the 32nd international Men's amateur baseball tournament. The tournament was sanctioned by the International Baseball Federation, which titled it the Amateur World Series from the 1938 tournament through the 1986 AWS. The tournament was held, for the fourth time, in Nicaragua, from August 3 to 14.

Cuba defeated South Korea in the final to win its 21st title.

There were 16 participating countries, split into two groups, with the first four of each group qualifying for the finals.

The next seven competitions were also held as the BWC tournament, which was replaced in 2015 by the quadrennial WBSC Premier12.

== First round ==
=== Pool A ===
Pos	Team	W	L	RS	RA
1	Cuba	7	0	83	7
2	Nicaragua	6	1	50	33
3	Italy	4	3	51	57
4	Chinese Taipei	4	3	49	36
5	Australia	3	4	54	47
6	Colombia	2	5	30	52
7	Dominican Republic	2	5	17	31
8	France	0	7	9	80

=== Pool B ===
Pos	Team	W	L	RS	RA
1	Japan	6	1	79	17
2	South Korea	5	2	57	32
3	Panama	5	2	33	41
4	United States	4	3	48	35
5	Netherlands	3	4	24	34
6	Puerto Rico	3	4	45	57
7	Sweden	1	6	11	66
8	Canada	1	6	27	52

== Final round ==
Quarterfinals
Cuba	15
United States	2
Nicaragua	10
Panama	4
Japan	6
Chinese Taipei	5
South Korea	13
Italy	2

Semifinals
Cuba	13
Nicaragua	1
Japan	0
South Korea	9

Finals
Cuba	6
South Korea	1
Third place
Nicaragua	1
Japan	8

== Final standings ==
Pos	Team	W	L
	Cuba	10	0
	South Korea	7	3
	Japan	8	2
4	Nicaragua	7	3
5	Panama	5	3
6	Chinese Taipei	4	4
7	United States	4	4
8	Italy	4	4
9	Australia	3	4
10	Netherlands	3	4
11	Puerto Rico	3	4
12	Colombia	2	5
13	Dominican Republic	2	5
14	Sweden	1	6
15	Canada	1	6
16	France	0	7

== Statistical leaders ==
=== Batting ===
Statistic	Name	Total
AVG	(Cuba) Ermidelio Urrutia	.613
HR	(Cuba) Orestes Kindelán	6
HR	(Cuba) Antonio Pacheco	6
H	(Cuba) Omar Linares	21
RBI	(Cuba) Lourdes Gourriel	18
SB	(Nicaragua) Sandy Moreno	6

Source: IBAF

=== Pitching ===
Statistic	Name	Total
ERA	(Dominican Republic) Marcelino Santana	0.00
ERA	(Cuba) Liván Hernández	0.00
ERA	(Netherlands) Edward van Bennekom	0.00
W	(Japan) Masanori Sugiura	3
SV	(Italy) Paolo Ceccaroli	2
SO	(Japan) Masanori Sugiura	32

Source: IBAF
