= Orestes Kindelán =

Cuban baseball player

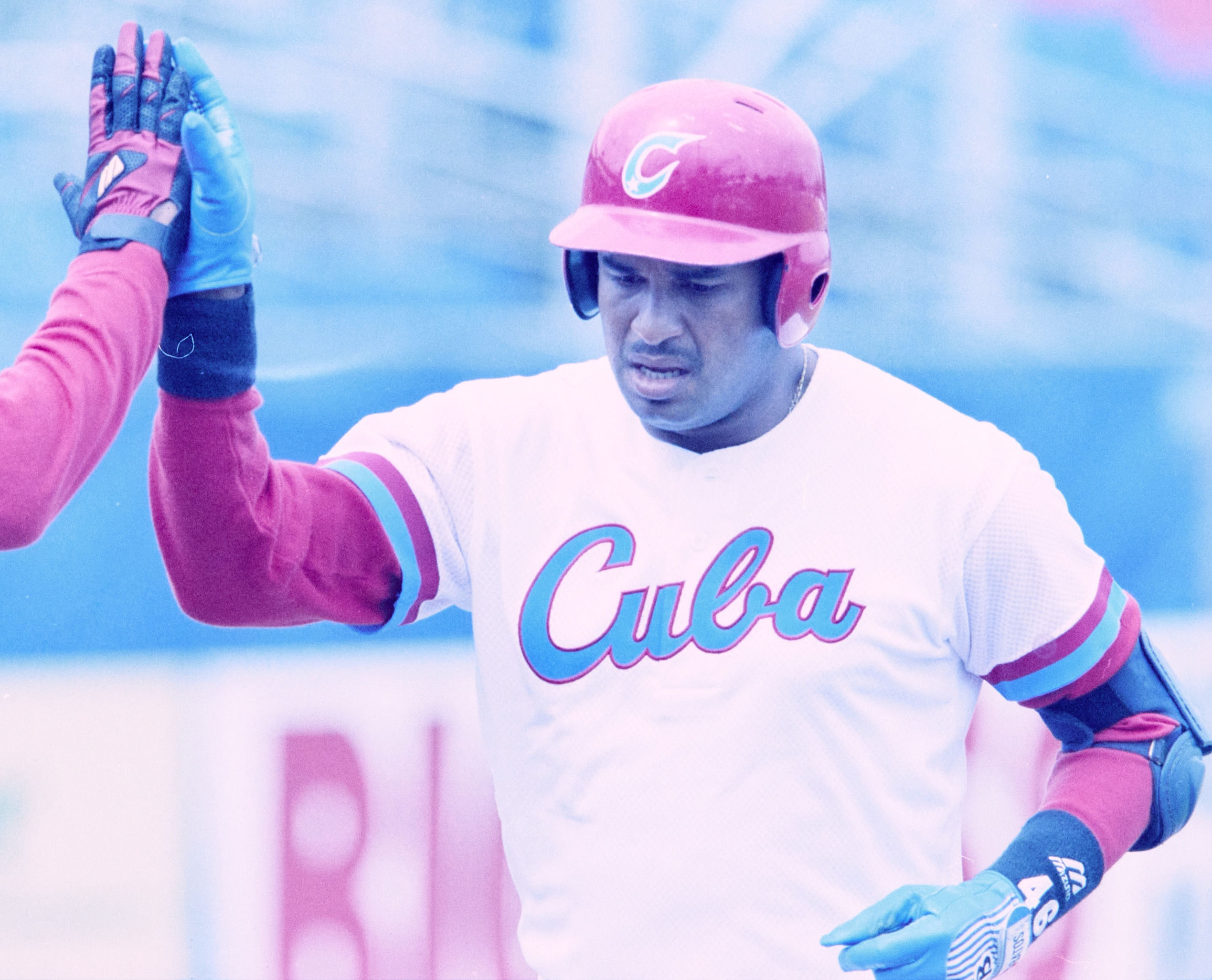
- Kindelán in 1998
- First baseman / Left fielder
- Born: November 1, 1964 (age 61); Palma Soriano, Oriente, Cuba
- Batted: Right Threw: Right

SNB debut
- August 6, 1982, for the Avispas de Oriente

Last SNB appearance
- December 18, 2002, for the Avispas de Santiago de Cuba

SNB statistics
- Hits: 2,030
- Home runs: 487
- Runs batted in: 1,511
- Stats at Baseball Reference

Teams
- Avispas de Oriente / Santiago de Cuba (1982–2002)

Career highlights and awards
- Baseball World Cup MVP (1990)

Member of the Cuban

Baseball Hall of Fame
- Induction: 2014
Medals
Men's baseball
Representing Cuba
Olympic Games
Gold medal – first place	1992 Barcelona	Team
Gold medal – first place	1996 Atlanta	Team
Silver medal – second place	2000 Sydney	Team
Pan American Games
Gold medal – first place	1987 Indianapolis	Team
Gold medal – first place	1991 Havana	Team
Gold medal – first place	1995 Mar del Plata	Team
Gold medal – first place	1999 Winnipeg	Team
Baseball World Cup
Gold medal – first place	1990 Edmonton	Team
Gold medal – first place	1994 Nicaragua	Team
Gold medal – first place	1998 Italy	Team
Gold medal – first place	2001 Taipei	Team
Intercontinental Cup
Silver medal – second place	1997 Barcelona	Team
Goodwill Games
Gold medal – first place	1990 Seattle	Team

Orestes Kindelán Olivares (born November 1, 1964) is a Cuban former professional baseball first baseman and left fielder. He spent most of his career in the Cuban National Series (SNB), playing all 21 seasons with Avispas de Oriente / Avispas de Santiago de Cuba. Nicknamed as "El Tambor Mayor" ("The Drum Major") as well as "El Cañon de Dos Rios", he was regarded as the most prolific home run hitter in the history of post-revolutionary Cuban baseball.

Kindelán starred on the Aplanadora Santiaguera ("Santiago Steamroller") team that won three consecutive SNB titles from 1999 to 2001. He was also an offensive powerhouse for the Cuban national baseball team, which won four Baseball World Cups, two Olympic gold medals, and various other international tournaments during his tenure.

== Domestic career ==
Kindelán debuted in the Cuban National Series on December 20, 1981. He played the bulk of his 21 seasons for his home province's Avispas de Santiago de Cuba. At the conclusion of the 1988–89 Cuban National Series, he became the first Cuban ballplayer to achieve the triple crown (for the eastern division of the SNB), batting .402 average with 24 home runs and 58 runs batted in.

Kindelán played for Japanese corporate team Shidax between 2002 and 2004 in the Intercity baseball tournament.

He retired as the holder of Cuban National Series records for home runs (487, with aluminium bat 17 series), runs batted in (1,511), and total bases (2,030).

== International career ==
Kindelán was a longtime member of the Cuba national baseball team. He earned two more triple crowns in international competition: at the 1990 Baseball World Cup in Canada (leading with a .588 batting average, six home runs, and 19 RBIs) and at the 1990 Central American and Caribbean Games, held in Mexico City (posting a .560 batting average, tied with Antonio Pacheco; six home runs; and 15 RBIs).

In international competition, Kindelán registered an exceptional at bats per home run rate of 7.5 (98 home runs in 735 official at-bats). At the 1996 Summer Olympics, he hit the longest home run ever recorded at Atlanta–Fulton County Stadium, a third-deck homer.

== Personal life ==
Kindelán briefly managed Santiago de Cuba for a single season in 2017–18. He currently manages the Templiers de Senart of the French Division 1 Baseball Championship. When he took over management of Senart in 2025, he became only the second Cuban, after Rolando Meriño, to coach in France.

His son, Lionard Kindelán, was also a baseball player with Santiago before leaving Cuba; he has played with Bologna in the Italian Serie A and with Samanes de Aragua in the Venezuelan Major League. Kindelán is a cousin of amateur boxer Mario Kindelán.
