= 1990 Baseball World Cup =

Tournament details
- Country: Canada
- Dates: 4–19 August
- Teams: 12

Final positions
- Champions: Cuba (20th title)
- Runners-up: Nicaragua
- Third place: South Korea
- Fourth place: Puerto Rico

Tournament statistics
- Games played: 53

Awards
- MVP: (Chinese Taipei) Kuo Lee Chien-Fu

The 1990 Baseball World Cup (BWC) was the 31st international Men's amateur baseball tournament. The tournament was sanctioned by the International Baseball Federation, which titled it the Amateur World Series from the 1938 tournament through the 1986 AWS. The tournament was held, for the only time, in Canada from August 4 to 19. Cuba defeated Nicaragua in the final to win its 20th title.

There were 12 participating countries, with all games played at the John Ducey Park in the city of Edmonton.

The next eight competitions were also held as the BWC tournament, then was replaced in 2015 by the quadrennial WBSC Premier12.

== First round ==
=== Pool A ===
Pos	Team	W	L	RS	RA
1	Cuba	5	0	70	8
2	Nicaragua	3	2	25	16
3	Japan	3	2	29	14
4	South Korea	2	3	26	39
5	Mexico	1	4	9	53
6	Italy	1	4	20	49

=== Pool B ===
Pos	Team	W	L	RS	RA
1	Puerto Rico	5	0	26	9
2	United States	4	1	66	22
3	Chinese Taipei	3	2	29	23
4	Canada	2	3	21	48
5	Netherlands	1	4	20	35
6	Venezuela	0	5	21	46

== Second round ==
=== Pool C ===
Pos	Team	W	L	RS	RA
1	Cuba	3	0	44	5
2	South Korea	2	1	17	9
3	Chinese Taipei	1	2	14	34
4	United States	0	3	11	38

=== Pool D ===
Pos	Team	W	L	RS	RA
1	Nicaragua	2	1	16	15
2	Puerto Rico	2	1	22	21
3	Japan	2	1	31	24
4	Canada	0	3	17	26

=== Pool E ===
Pos	Team	W	L	RS	RA
1	Netherlands	2	1	28	25
2	Italy	2	1	21	17
3	Mexico	1	2	19	21
4	Venezuela	1	2	12	17

== Final round ==
=== 7th place game ===
17 August 1990	United States	9 – 4	Canada	John Ducey Park, Edmonton

=== 5th place game ===
17 August 1990	Chinese Taipei	3 – 14	Japan	John Ducey Park, Edmonton

=== Bronze medal game ===
18 August 1990	Puerto Rico	4 – 7	South Korea	John Ducey Park, Edmonton

=== Final ===
18 August 1990	Nicaragua	0 – 14	Cuba	John Ducey Park, Edmonton

19 August 1990	Cuba	11 – 5	Nicaragua	John Ducey Park, Edmonton

== Final standings ==
Pos	Team	W	L
	Cuba	10	0
	Nicaragua	5	5
	South Korea	5	4
4	Puerto Rico	7	2
5	Japan	6	3
6	Chinese Taipei	4	5
7	United States	5	4
8	Canada	2	7
9	Netherlands	3	5
10	Italy	3	5
11	Mexico	2	6
12	Venezuela	1	7

== Awards ==
Tournament Awards
Award	Player
MVP	(Chinese Taipei) Kuo Lee Chien-Fu
Leading hitter	(Cuba) Orestes Kindelán
Pitcher with best ERA	(Cuba) Lázaro Valle
Pitcher with best win/loss average	(Chinese Taipei) Kuo Lee Chien-Fu
Most Runs batted in	(Cuba) Orestes Kindelán
Most Home runs	(Cuba) Orestes Kindelán
Most Stolen bases	(Japan) Masato Naito
Most Runs scored	(Cuba) Omar Linares
Outstanding defensive player	(Puerto Rico) Efraín García

All Star Team
Position	Player
Pitchers	(Cuba) Omar Ajete
Pitchers	(Chinese Taipei) Kuo Lee Chien-Fu
Catcher	(Cuba) Pedro Rodríguez
First base	(Cuba) Lourdes Gourriel
Second base	(Nicaragua) Julio Medina
Third base	(Cuba) Omar Linares
Shortstop	(Cuba) Germán Mesa
Outfield	(Japan) Shinichi Sato
Outfield	(Puerto Rico) Ángel Morales
Outfield	(Netherlands) Rikkert Faneyte
Designated hitter	(Cuba) Orestes Kindelán
