= 1990 Central American and Caribbean Games =

Sports events held in Mexico City, Mexico

Central American and Caribbean Sports Games
- Host city: Mexico City
- Country: Mexico
- Motto: The Solidarity Games; Spanish: Los Juegos de la Solidaridad
- Edition: 16th
- Nations: 29
- Athletes: 4,206
- Opening: 20 November 1990
- Closing: 3 December 1990
- Opened by: Carlos Salinas de Gortari
- Athlete's Oath: Sonia Cárdeñas; Mario González
- Torch lighter: Elsa Hayashi; Arturo Barrios
- Main venue: Olympic Stadium

The 16th Central American and Caribbean Games were held in Mexico City the capital of Mexico from November 20 to December 3, 1990, and included a total of 4,206 competitors from 29 nations, the largest the games had ever seen.

The 1990 Central American Games in Honduras had been staged in January 1990.

== Mascots ==
The mascots for the Games were two jaguars named Balam and Yutzil.

== Sports ==
- Archery
- Artistic gymnastics
- Athletics
- Badminton
- Basketball
- Boxing
- Canoeing
- Cycling
- Diving
- Equestrian
- Fencing
- Field hockey
- Football
- Handball
- Judo
- Karate
- Rhythmic gymnastics
- Racquetball
- Rowing
- Sailing
- Shooting
- Softball
- Synchronized swimming
- Swimming
- Table tennis
- Taekwondo
- Tennis
- Water polo
- Weightlifting
- Wrestling

== Medal table ==
Rank	Nation	Gold	Silver	Bronze	Total
1	Cuba	180	90	52	322
2	Mexico	114	101	84	299
3	Puerto Rico	21	47	41	109
4	Colombia	18	29	39	86
5	Venezuela	14	42	72	128
6	Dominican Republic	5	11	29	45
7	Jamaica	4	4	5	13
8	Guatemala	2	5	25	32
9	Costa Rica	1	7	11	19
10	Panama	1	2	10	13
11	Suriname	1	1	1	3
12	Trinidad and Tobago	0	5	8	13
13	Nicaragua	0	4	6	10
14	Honduras	0	4	2	6
15	Antigua and Barbuda	0	2	1	3
16	Bermuda	0	1	5	6
17	El Salvador	0	1	3	4
17	Virgin Islands	0	1	3	4
19	Guyana	0	1	2	3
20	Barbados	0	1	0	1
21	Bahamas	0	0	1	1
21	Grenada	0	0	1	1
21	Haiti	0	0	1	1
21	Netherlands Antilles	0	0	1	1
Totals (24 entries)		361	359	403	1,123
