= 1990 Goodwill Games =

International event in Seattle, US

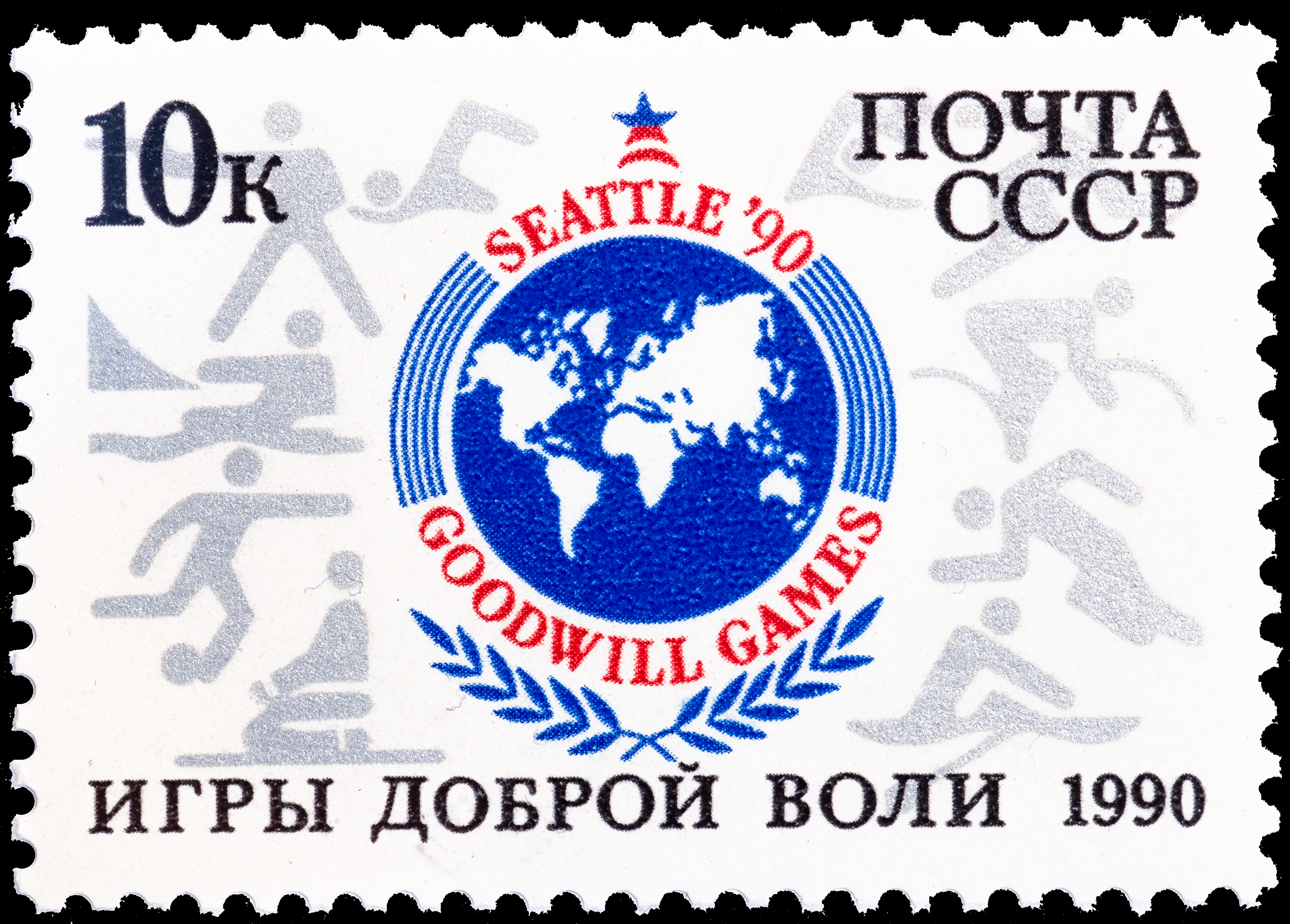
- Soviet postage stamp commemorating the 1990 Goodwill Games
- Host city: Seattle, Washington
- Country: United States
- Opening: July 20, 1990
- Closing: August 5, 1990

The 1990 Goodwill Games was the second edition of the international multi-sport event created by Ted Turner, which was held between July 20 and August 5, 1990. Following an inaugural edition in Moscow, the second games took place in Seattle, United States, highlighting the competition's role in fostering good Soviet–U.S. relations. The games were opened at the University of Washington's Husky Stadium with a speech by former U.S. President Ronald Reagan, as well as an address by Arnold Schwarzenegger and performances by the Moody Blues and Gorky Park. The top three nations in the medal table remained the same as in the previous edition: the Soviet Union won 66 gold medals and a total of 188 medals, the United States was a close runner-up with 60 gold medals and 161 medals overall, while East Germany was a distant third with 11 golds.

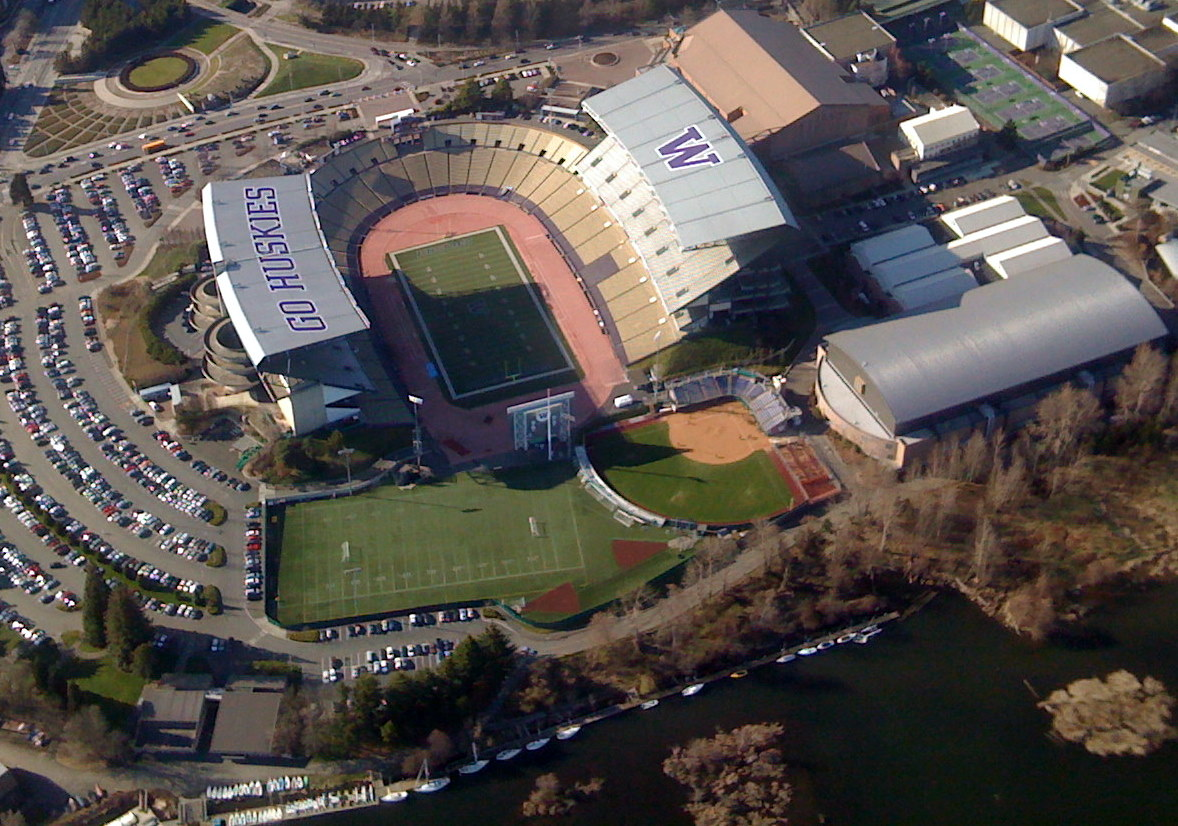
A renovated Husky Stadium hosted the opening ceremony of the second games.

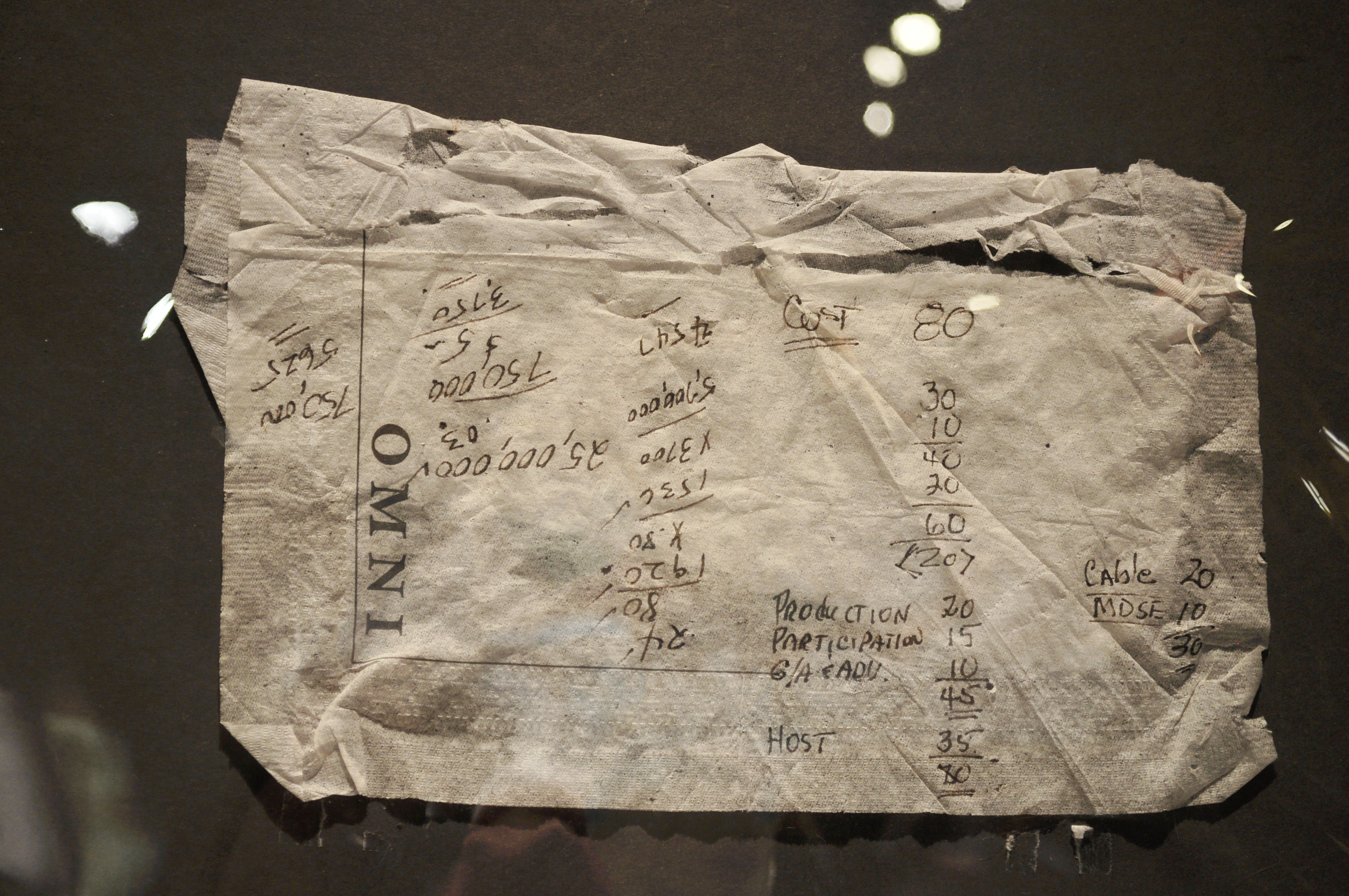
The napkin on which the preliminary financial arrangements for the Games were sketched out

The games' motto was "Uniting the World's Best", and a total of 2,312 athletes from 54 countries engaged in the 17-day program of 21 sports. Each country's contingent of athletes did not parade separately at the opening ceremony, but instead all athletes entered the stadium as one large mass (emphasizing the theme of international unity). The size of the sporting program meant that some events were held in other Washington cities, including Tacoma, Spokane, and the Tri-Cities area. A number of venues in the region were built or renovated for the Games: Federal Way gained an aquatics venue (King County Aquatic Center) through the games, while Seattle itself gained a new track for Husky Stadium and new flooring for the Edmundson Pavilion. The Seattle Space Needle had a large purpose-built gold medal hung around the structure during the Games.

The competition featured a significant cultural aspect compared to the previous edition. Around 1,400 Soviet athletes went to the US and stayed with host families in Seattle. Soviet cosmonauts also visited schools in the city and the Moscow State Circus gave a number of performances. A Goodwill Games Arts Festival was held in conjunction with the sporting event – 1,300 artists took part in the festival, which featured a performance by the Bolshoi Ballet, a museum exhibition of Soviet history, and a 2 million-dollar stage production of Leo Tolstoy's War and Peace. Similarly to the 1986 Goodwill Games, the 1990 edition of the event was not financially successful and Ted Turner personally lost $44 million as a result.

Two world records were broken during the Games: the 200-meter breaststroke mark was topped by all three medalists in the race, with American Mike Barrowman improving the record to two minutes and 11.53 seconds. Soviet athlete Nadezhda Ryashkina completed a world record of 41:56.21 in the 10 km race walk.

== Preparations ==
Seattle was awarded hosting rights for the 1990 Games by Turner on June 6, 1986, ahead of New York, Philadelphia, Chicago, and Atlanta.

== Sports ==
- Athletics
- Baseball
- Basketball
- Boxing
- Cycling
- Diving
- Figure skating
- Football
- Gymnastics
- Handball
- Ice hockey
- Judo
- Modern pentathlon
- Rowing
- Swimming
- Synchronized swimming
- Volleyball
- Water polo
- Weightlifting
- Wrestling

== Venues ==
Although the games were billed as occurring in Seattle, events took place at venues throughout Washington state:

- Cheney Stadium (baseball) in Tacoma
- Enumclaw Fair Grounds (equestrian phase, modern pentathlon) in Enumclaw, Washington
- Hec Edmundson Pavilion (volleyball) in Seattle
- Husky Stadium (athletics) in Seattle
- Weyerhaeuser King County Aquatics Center (diving, swimming, synchronized swimming, water polo) in Federal Way
- Seattle Center Coliseum (basketball) in Seattle
- Spokane Coliseum (weightlifting, rhythmic gymnastics, volleyball) in Spokane
- Tacoma Dome (figure skating, gymnastics, ice hockey final) in Tacoma
- Tri-Cities Coliseum (ice hockey, figure skating) in Kennewick
- Mount Baker Rowing and Sailing Center, Lake Washington (rowing)
- Marymoor Velodrome (track cycling) in Redmond

== Medal table ==
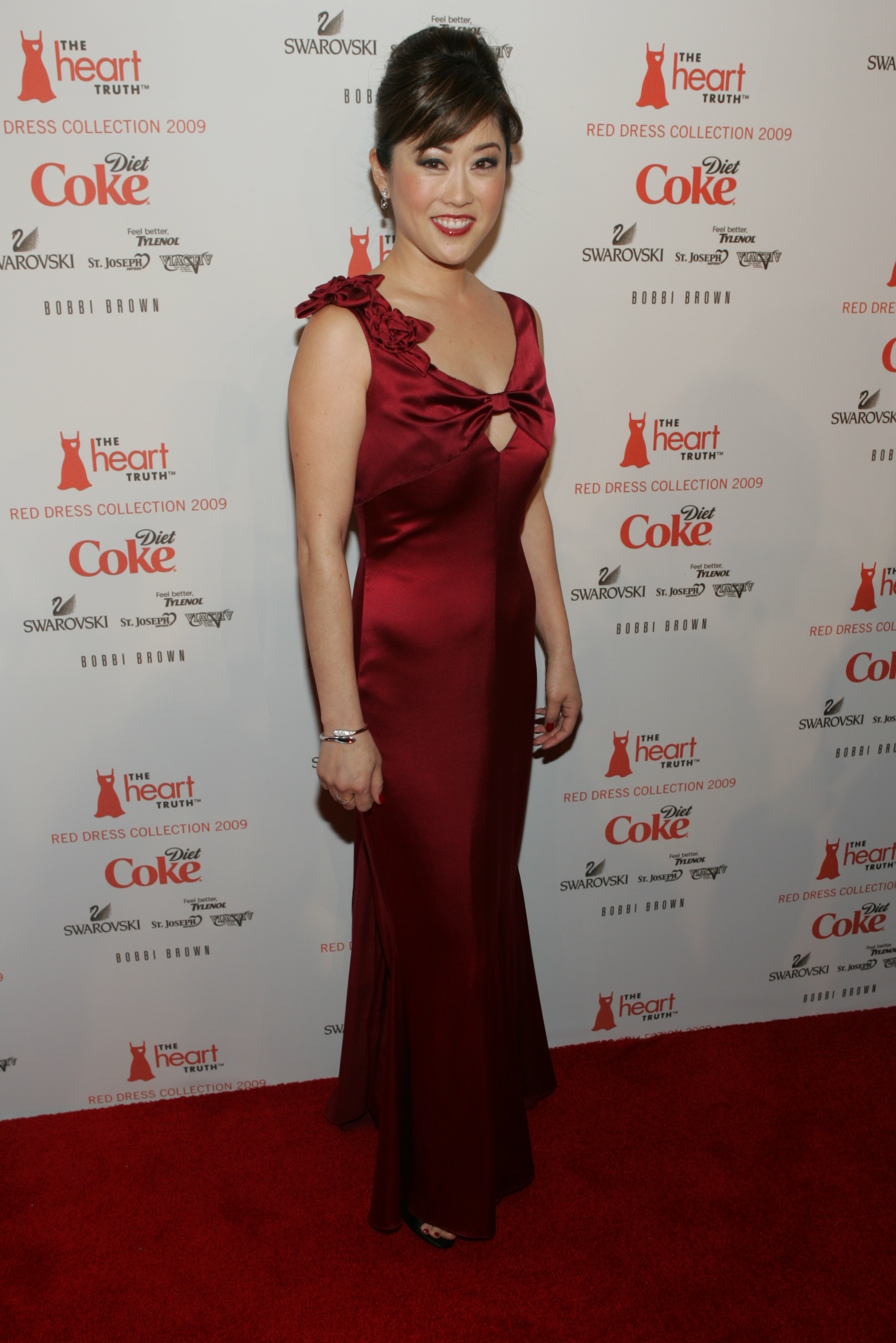
American Kristi Yamaguchi won her first major international gold medal in figure skating at the Games.

* Host nation (United States)

Rank	Nation	Gold	Silver	Bronze	Total
1	Soviet Union (URS)	66	68	54	188
2	United States (USA)*	60	53	48	161
3	East Germany (GDR)	11	8	24	43
4	Bulgaria (BUL)	8	7	9	24
5	China (CHN)	6	7	3	16
6	Cuba (CUB)	6	4	3	13
7	West Germany (FRG)	4	3	8	15
8	Canada (CAN)	4	1	6	11
9	Poland (POL)	4	1	0	5
10	South Korea (KOR)	3	2	2	7
10	Spain (ESP)	3	2	2	7
12	Romania (ROM)	2	4	2	8
13	Japan (JPN)	2	3	10	15
14	Italy (ITA)	2	2	1	5
15	Yugoslavia (YUG)	2	1	0	3
16	Hungary (HUN)	1	1	5	7
16	Netherlands (NED)	1	1	5	7
18	Jamaica (JAM)	1	1	2	4
19	Denmark (DEN)	1	1	1	3
20	Mongolia (MGL)	1	1	0	2
21	Czechoslovakia (TCH)	1	0	0	1
21	Mexico (MEX)	1	0	0	1
21	Morocco (MAR)	1	0	0	1
21	Suriname (SUR)	1	0	0	1
25	Australia (AUS)	0	4	3	7
26	Great Britain (GBR)	0	2	2	4
27	Turkey (TUR)	0	2	1	3
28	Ethiopia (ETH)	0	2	0	2
28	New Zealand (NZL)	0	2	0	2
30	Brazil (BRA)	0	1	6	7
31	Kenya (KEN)	0	1	1	2
32	Bahamas (BAH)	0	1	0	1
33	France (FRA)	0	0	1	1
33	Ireland (IRL)	0	0	1	1
33	Sweden (SWE)	0	0	1	1
33	U.S. Virgin Islands (ISV)	0	0	1	1
Totals (36 entries)		192	186	202	580

== Participation ==
A total of 54 nations were represented at the 1990 Games with a total of 2312 athletes attending the games. However, around 3500 athletes had received invitations to the games and the attendance was a marked decline from the inaugural edition.

- Australia
- Bahamas
- Brazil
- Bulgaria
- Canada
- China
- Colombia
- Ivory Coast
- Cuba
- Czechoslovakia
- Denmark
- Djibouti
- East Germany
- Egypt
- Ethiopia
- France
- Great Britain
- Hungary
- Iceland
- Ireland
- Italy
- Jamaica
- Japan
- Kenya
- Mexico
- Mongolia
- Morocco
- Netherlands
- New Zealand
- Niger
- Nigeria
- North Korea
- Norway
- Oman
- Peru
- Poland
- Portugal
- Puerto Rico
- Romania
- Somalia
- South Korea
- Soviet Union
- Spain
- Suriname
- Sweden
- Switzerland
- Taiwan
- Tanzania
- Turkey
- United States
- Venezuela
- United States Virgin Islands
- West Germany
- Yugoslavia
