= Omar Linares =

Cuban baseball player

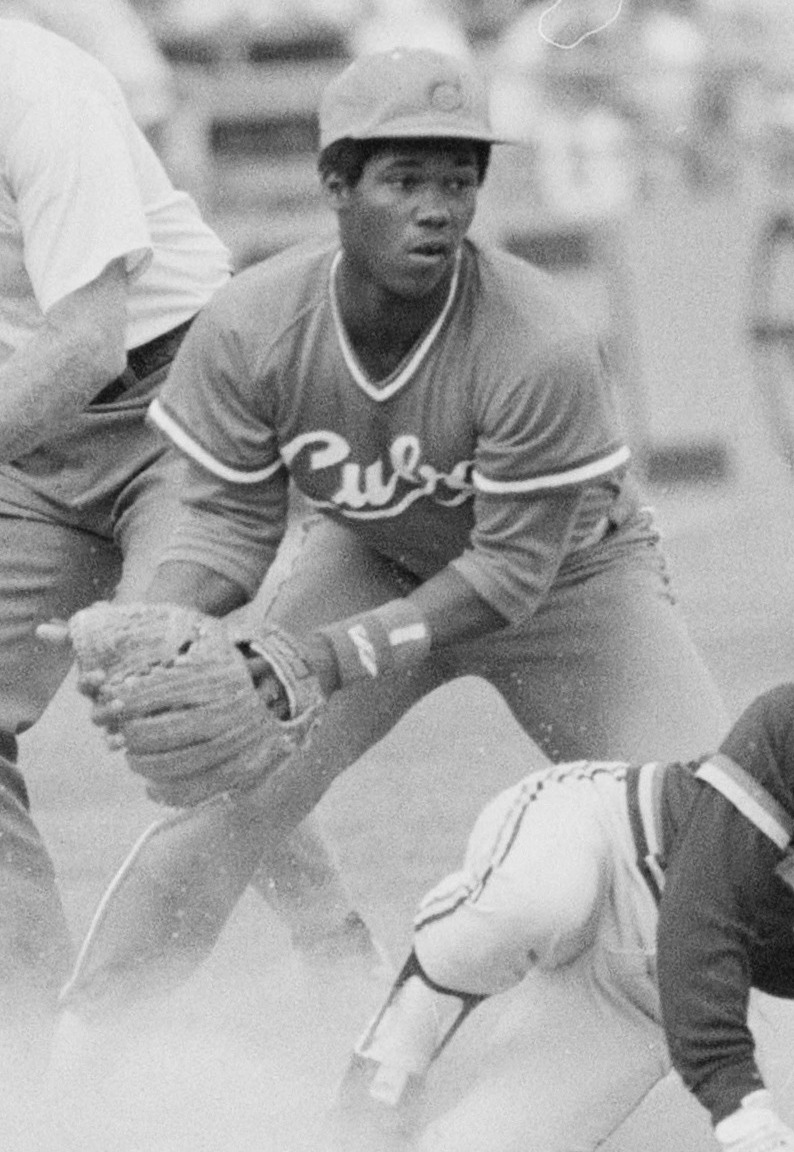
- Linares at the 1986 Amateur World Series
- Third baseman / First baseman / Coach
- Born: October 23, 1967 (age 58); San Juan y Martínez, Pinar del Río, Cuba
- Batted: Right Threw: Right

Professional debut
- SNB: 1982, for the Pinar del Río
- NPB: July 23, 2002, for the Chunichi Dragons

Last appearance
- SNB: June 16, 2002, for the Pinar del Río
- NPB: 2004, for the Chunichi Dragons

SNB statistics
- Batting average: .368
- Home runs: 404
- Runs batted in: 1,221

NPB statistics
- Batting average: .246
- Home runs: 11
- Runs batted in: 61

Teams
- Vegueros de Pinar del Río (1982–2002); Chunichi Dragons (2002–2004)

Member of the Cuban

Baseball Hall of Fame
- Induction: 2014

Omar Linares Izquierdo (born October 23, 1967) is a Cuban former professional baseball third baseman, first baseman and coach. He played for the Cuba national baseball team as well as professionally for Vegueros de Pinar del Río of the Cuban National Series (SNB) and Chunichi Dragons of Nippon Professional Baseball (NPB).

In 2009, Linares decided to become a hitting and first base coach for longtime rival team Industriales, helping them to conquer a national championship, his first as an assistant coach.

== Career in Cuba ==
Linares spent 20 seasons with Pinar del Río in Cuba's National Series, compiling a career .368 batting average, the best in the league's history, with 404 home runs (third among all-times in Cuban league), 1,547 runs batted in and 264 stolen bases. He led the National Series in batting average four times, in RBIs four times and in walks six times. At the end of his career, Linares spent three seasons with the Chunichi Dragons of Japan's Central League, retiring in 2004.

== International career ==
As a 14-year-old, Linares was the starting second baseman for the Cuba national youth team at the World Championship, where they won gold. The inclusion of Linares in the Cuba national baseball team at the age of 17, as an optional replacement of slugger Jose "Cheito" Rodriguez after his suspension by the Cuba National baseball commission, is attributed to former manager Jose Miguel Pineda. Linares was a mainstay on the national team under the guidance of Luis Giraldo Casanova during much of the 1980s and 1990s, as the starting third baseman on World Championship winning teams in 1986, 1988, 1990, 1994, 1998 and 2001. He was part of Cuba's Olympic gold medal teams in 1992 and 1996, and the silver medal team in 2000. Linares also played for the Cuba national team in their 1999 exhibition series versus the Baltimore Orioles of Major League Baseball.
