= United States national baseball team =

Information
- Country: United States
- Federation: USA Baseball
- Confederation: WBSC Americas
- Manager: Mark DeRosa (WBC); Mike Scioscia (WBSC)
- Captain: Aaron Judge
- Team Colors: Red, White, Navy, Ash Gray

WBSC ranking
- Current: 3 (26 October 2026)
- Highest: 2 (December 2012, December 2016 – March 2020, March 2023 – October 2023)
- Lowest: 5 (December 2021, September 2024 – December 2024)

Uniforms
Home	Away

Olympic Games
- Appearances: 5 (first in 1992)
- Best result: Gold (2000)

World Baseball Classic
- Appearances: 6 (first in 2006)
- Best result: (gold) 1st (2017)

WBSC Premier12
- Appearances: 3 (first in 2015)
- Best result: (silver) 2nd (2015)

World Cup
- Appearances: 24 (first in 1938)
- Best result: (gold) 1st (1973, 1974, 2007, 2009)

Intercontinental Cup
- Appearances: 16 (first in 1973)
- Best result: 1st (1975, 1981)

Pan American Games
- Appearances: 15 (first in 1951)
- Best result: 1st (1967)

Medal record

Olympic Games
Gold medal – first place	2000 Sydney	Team
Silver medal – second place	2020 Tokyo	Team
Bronze medal – third place	1996 Atlanta	Team
Bronze medal – third place	2008 Beijing	Team

World Baseball Classic
Gold medal – first place	2017 Los Angeles	
Silver medal – second place	2023 Miami	
Silver medal – second place	2026 Miami	

WBSC Premier12
Silver medal – second place	2015 Tokyo	
Bronze medal – third place	2024 Tokyo	

World Cup
Gold medal – first place	1973 Nicaragua	
Gold medal – first place	1974 United States	
Gold medal – first place	2007 Taiwan	
Gold medal – first place	2009 Italy	
Silver medal – second place	1938 United Kingdom	
Silver medal – second place	1969 Dominican Republic	
Silver medal – second place	1970 Colombia	
Silver medal – second place	1972 Nicaragua	
Silver medal – second place	1978 Italy	
Silver medal – second place	1988 Italy	
Silver medal – second place	2001 Taiwan	
Bronze medal – third place	1939 Cuba	
Bronze medal – third place	1940 Cuba	
Bronze medal – third place	1982 South Korea	
Bronze medal – third place	1984 Cuba	

Intercontinental Cup
Gold medal – first place	1975 Canada	
Gold medal – first place	1981 Canada	
Silver medal – second place	1977 Nicaragua	
Silver medal – second place	1983 Belgium	
Silver medal – second place	1987 Cuba	
Silver medal – second place	1993 Italy	
Bronze medal – third place	1973 Italy	
Bronze medal – third place	1979 Cuba	

World Games
Gold medal – first place	1981 Santa Clara	Team

Pan American Games
Gold medal – first place	1967 Winnipeg	Team
Silver medal – second place	1951 Buenos Aires	Team
Silver medal – second place	1955 Mexico City	Team
Silver medal – second place	1963 São Paulo	Team
Silver medal – second place	1971 Cali	Team
Silver medal – second place	1975 Mexico City	Team
Silver medal – second place	1987 Indianapolis	Team
Silver medal – second place	1999 Winnipeg	Team
Silver medal – second place	2003 Santo Domingo	Team
Silver medal – second place	2007 Rio de Janeiro	Team
Silver medal – second place	2011 Guadalajara	Team
Silver medal – second place	2015 Toronto	Team
Bronze medal – third place	1959 Chicago	Team
Bronze medal – third place	1983 Caracas	Team
Bronze medal – third place	1991 Havana	Team

The United States national baseball team, also known as Team USA, represents the United States in international baseball competitions. Currently ranked third in the world by the World Baseball Softball Confederation, the team won the Olympic baseball tournament in 2000 and the World Baseball Classic (WBC) in 2017.

The U.S. national team debuted at the first Baseball World Cup (originally the Amateur World Series) in 1938. They won the tournament, which was the premier level of international baseball for some periods of its existence until it was discontinued in 2011, four times. (Note: USA Baseball lists the first two wins (1973 and 1974) under the collegiate national team, and the final two (2007 and 2009) under the senior professional team.) The U.S. team has participated in every baseball tournament at the Summer Olympics, except for 2004, and won its first Olympic gold at the 2000 Olympics. The United States was an inaugural member of the WBC, making its debut in 2006. In their first three appearances in the WBC, the best finish for the Americans was fourth place in 2009. In 2017, the team won the WBC title for the first time, defeating Puerto Rico in the championship game. This breakthrough was followed up by another championship game appearance in 2023, with the team losing to Japan. The U.S. reached the championship game for a third time in a row in the 2026, but lost to Venezuela.

The U.S. team qualified for the 2020 Summer Olympics by winning the eight-team Americas Qualifying Event in June 2021. In the Olympic competition, held in Tokyo in July and August 2021, the team won the silver medal, losing to hosts Japan in the gold medal game. With baseball not featured at the 2024 Summer Olympics in Paris, Team USA will next compete in the 2028 Los Angeles Olympics.

The team is governed by USA Baseball, and its headquarters and training facilities are located in Cary, North Carolina. Along with the professional national team, the U.S. also fields collegiate, 18U, 15U, and 12U national baseball teams. The performances of all of the teams contribute to the WBSC ranking of the national team through various tournaments hosted by the World Baseball Softball Confederation.

== History ==
=== Early years ===
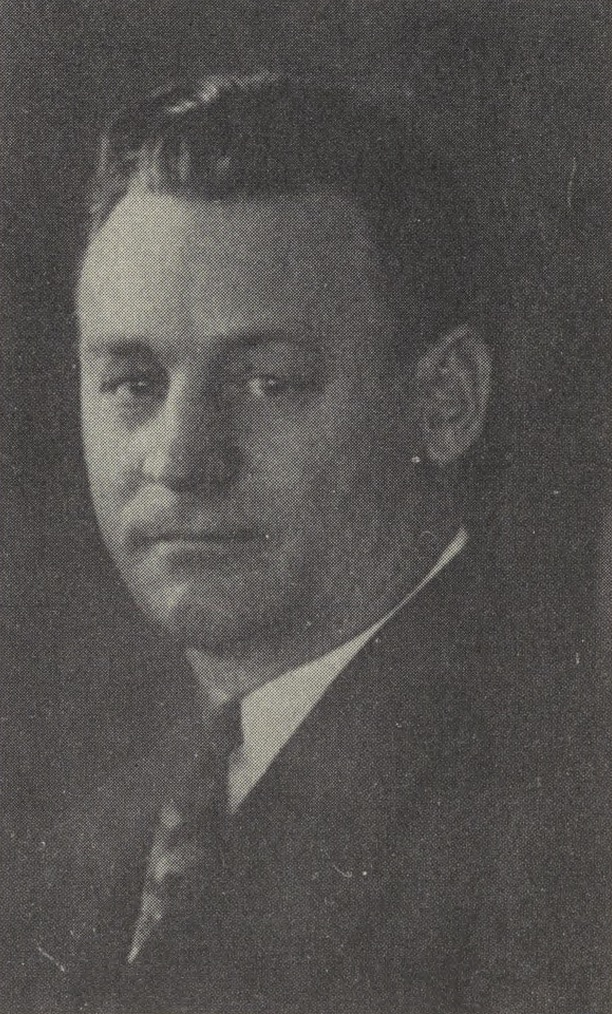
Leslie Mann in 1940

International baseball games were played informally by American teams, against Canadian clubs, as early as 1860. However, the development of a national team occurred with the early Summer Olympics, which saw baseball debut unofficially in 1904 in St. Louis (though few records exist). An ad-hoc American team, including future Major League Baseball player Jim Thorpe, competed against a Swedish team (featuring four Americans) at the 1912 Olympics in Stockholm, and a team of World War I servicemen played a Canadian team at the 1919 Inter-Allied Games in Paris.

Leslie Mann, a former major leaguer himself, is credited with the formation of the first official U.S. national team. He formed the United States Amateur Baseball Association (also known as the USA Baseball Congress) on February 19, 1931, with the hopes of sponsoring an international tournament. Mann's efforts to include baseball at the Olympics saw little success (no other country sent a team to 1936 in Berlin, and the 1940 Games in Tokyo were cancelled due to World War II), but he did hold the first Amateur World Series in 1938. The U.S. team, made out of amateur players, lost a best-of-five series to Great Britain.

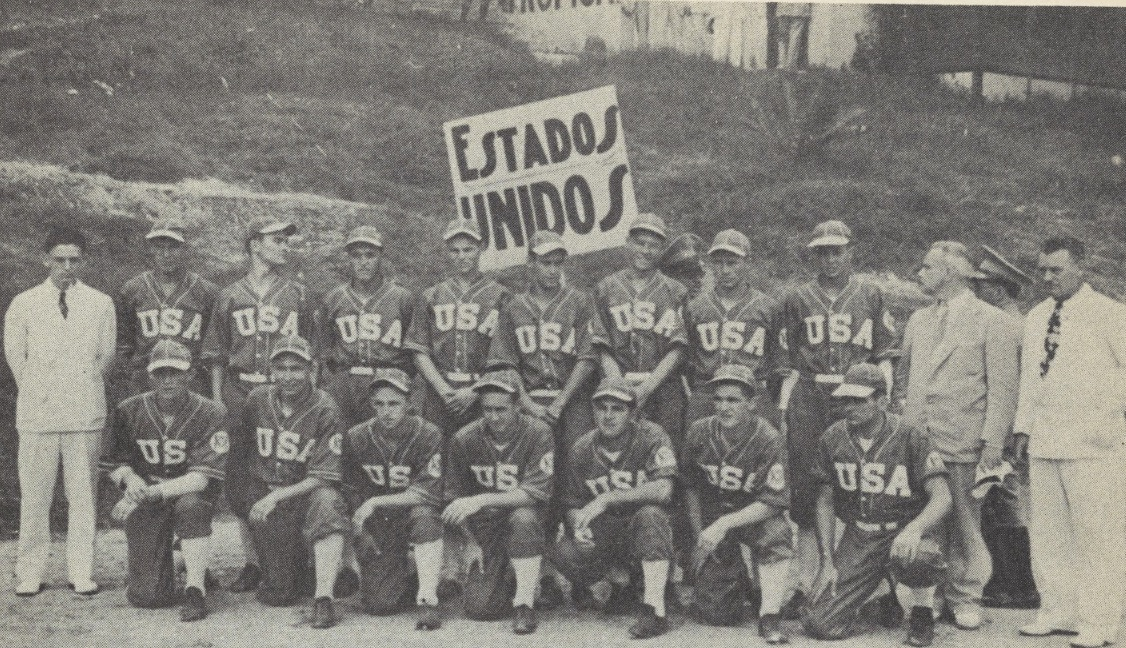
The United States team at the 1939 Amateur World Series

The USA Baseball Congress sent a national team to the Amateur World Series in 1939, 1940 (tying for a silver medal), and 1941, all held in Havana, Cuba. The United States' international participation was hampered by World War II, as well as the country's early withdrawal from the 1942 Amateur World Series due to a brawl with the Dominican Republic team and, purportedly, the influence of Dominican dictator Rafael Trujillo. After 1942, the United States was largely absent from the international baseball scene, as it did not participate in another Amateur World Series until 1969.

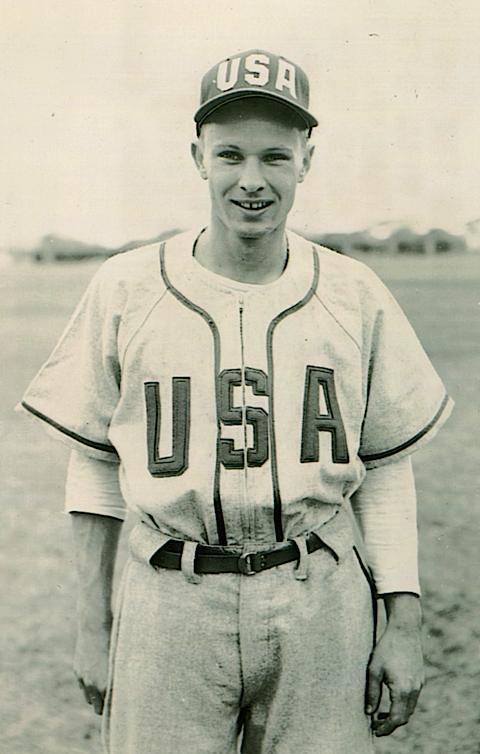
Dick Griesser, a future Collegiate All-American, on the U.S. team at the 1956 Summer Olympics

While an American team competed against Australia at the 1956 Summer Olympics in Melbourne, the next "official" participation in an international tournament (i.e. recognized by USA Baseball) was at the 1959 Pan American Games. Held at Wrigley Field and Comiskey Park in Chicago, the 1959 team was made up of collegiate players, including future Hall of Famer Lou Brock. The U.S. team made its first official appearance at the Olympics during the 1964 Tokyo Games, managed by longtime University of Southern California coach Rod Dedeaux.

The United States victory at the 1967 Pan American Games in Winnipeg, Canada spurred renewed interest in international competitions. William P. "Dutch" Fehring, president of a rejuvenated United States Baseball Federation (USBF), decided to actively participate in International Baseball Federation (FIBA) competitions. In 1968, the U.S. won a post-Olympic tournament in Mexico City. The following year, it returned to the Amateur World Series in Santo Domingo in 1969, narrowly losing the gold medal to Cuba. However, international baseball was fraught with tensions in the early 1970s; as a result of protracted disagreements with FIBA, the international governing body of baseball, the U.S. federation withdrew in 1973 and formed its own body, the World Amateur Baseball Federation (better known as FEMBA, or the Federación Mundial de Béisbol Amateur). That year, the United States won its first Amateur World Series in Nicaragua and repeated a year later in St. Petersburg, Florida in the first Amateur World Series held in the U.S. The FIBA-FEMBA split was resolved by 1975, and the U.S. and its followers rejoined the new group, AINBA.

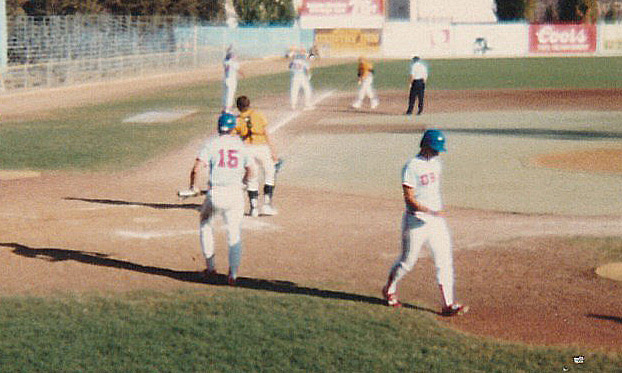
The United States at bat in the 1981 World Games

The U.S. national team won the gold medal in the first-ever World Games, held at San Jose Municipal Stadium in San Jose, California in 1981. The U.S. fielded a roster of collegiate players that included Franklin Stubbs, Oddibe McDowell, Spike Owen, John Russell, Ed Vosberg, and Pat Clements among other future major leaguers. The U.S. national team completed the tournament undefeated, securing victories over Australia, Panama, and South Korea. Over the course of these games, they outscored their opponents by a 14-run differential. Their performance resulted in a gold medal win.

=== Olympic competitions ===
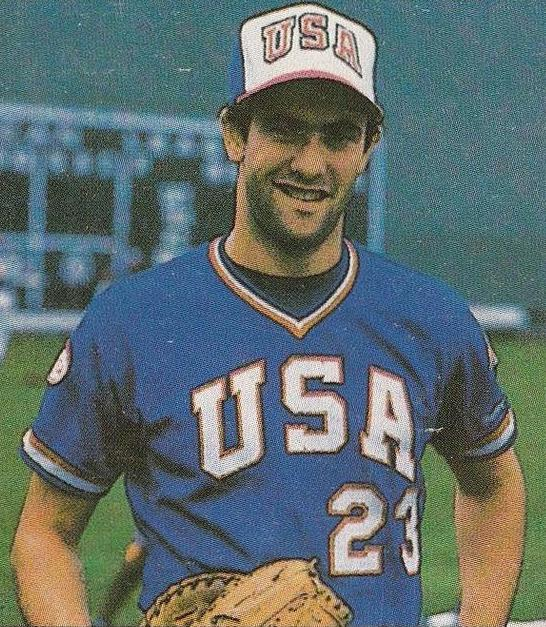
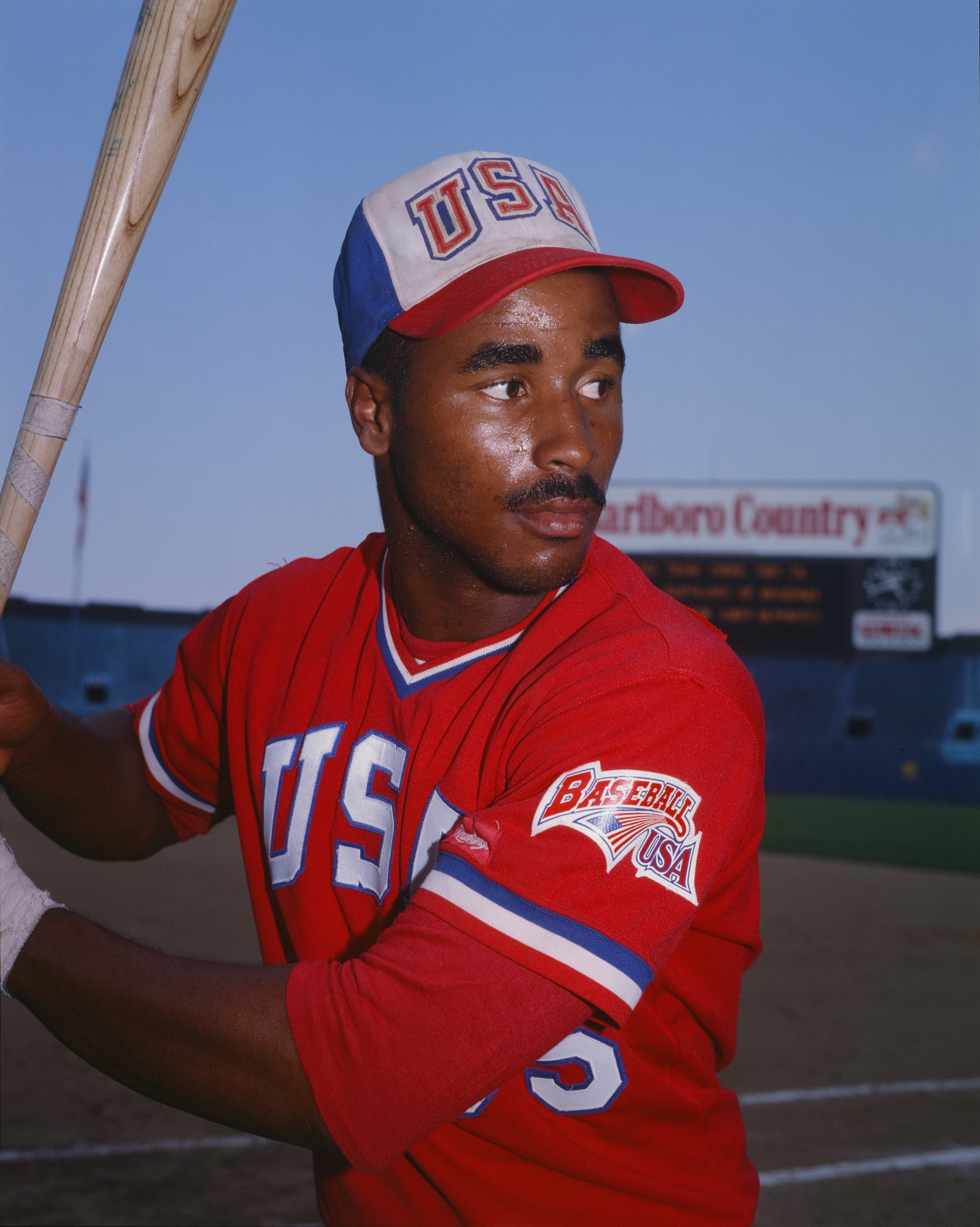
Will Clark (left) and Shane Mack (right) on the 1984 Olympic team

The 1984 Summer Olympics in Los Angeles was the first to feature a tournament in the program. Eight teams competed in the tournament held at Dodger Stadium. Cuba, after winning the gold medal at the 1983 Pan American Games, planned to participate but did not as a result of the Soviet-led boycott. The United States national team finished second, falling to Japan in the final game, 6–3. No official medals were awarded as baseball was a demonstration sport.

Baseball returned as a demonstration sport at the 1988 Summer Olympics in Seoul. Again an eight-team tournament, the United States finished first in the tournament, defeating Japan, 5–3, in the final game.

Baseball became an official medal sport beginning with the 1992 Summer Olympics in Barcelona. Competition was open only to male amateurs in 1992 and 1996. As a result, the United States and other nations where professional baseball is developed relied on college baseball players, while Cuba used their most experienced veterans, who technically were considered amateurs as they nominally held other jobs. Professional baseball players were introduced in 2000, but the situation remained largely the same. No active players from Major League Baseball (MLB) competed—as MLB declined to release its players—so Team USA utilized minor-league players and free agents, while Cuba and some other nations were still able to use their best players, as they had no commitments with MLB. Nevertheless, at the 1996 Summer Olympics in Atlanta, the United States won the bronze medal over Nicaragua after finishing with a 6–1 record in pool play and losing to Japan in the semifinals.

At the 2000 Summer Olympics, the United States had a 6–1 record in pool play, then defeated South Korea in the semifinals, followed by a stunning victory over the heavily favored Team Cuba in the gold-medal game—an upset later dubbed the "Miracle on Grass".

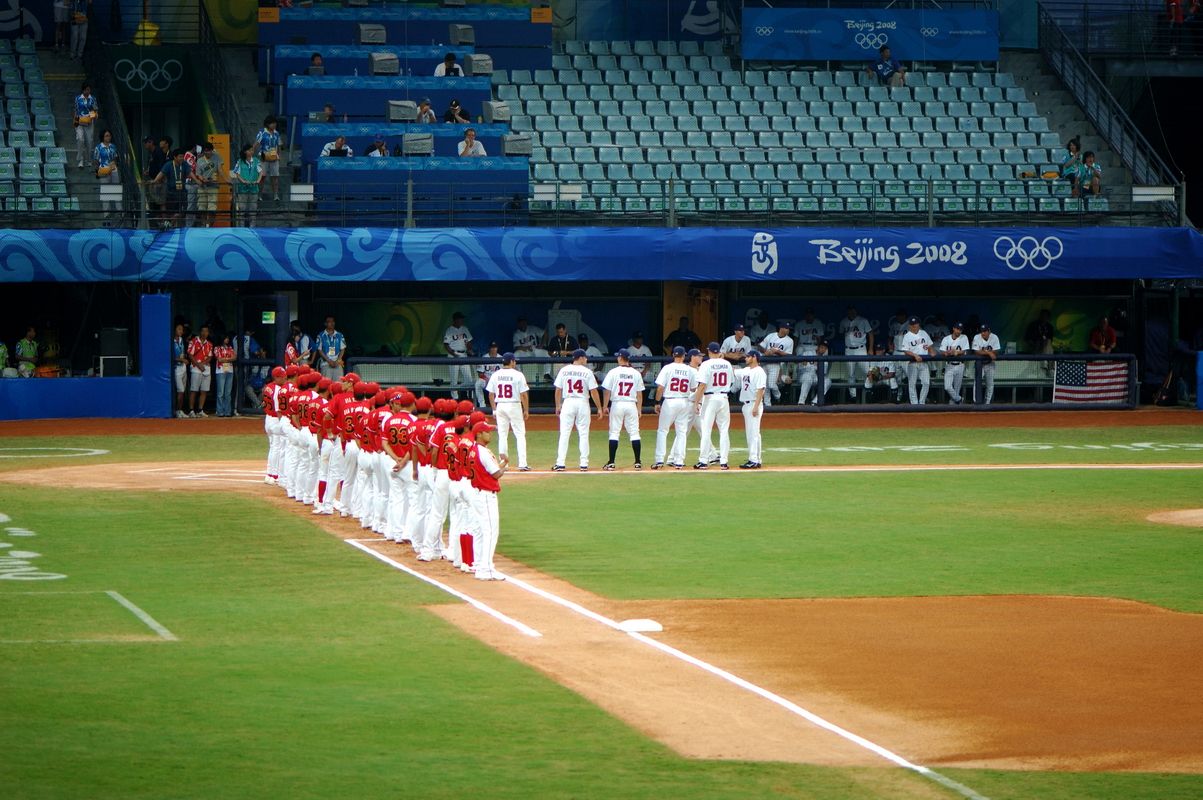
The U.S. national team (lined up on the third base side) at the 2008 Olympics

The United States did not qualify for the 2004 Summer Olympics in Athens, despite being the defending gold medalists, after losing a qualifying game to Mexico, 2–1. That qualifier was controversial due to its format (single-elimination, rather than double-elimination), scheduling, and the fact that only two slots were given to nations from the Americas, while Europe received three.

The United States qualified for the 2008 Summer Olympics by winning the American Qualifying Tournament. At the Beijing Games, the U.S. finished with a 5–2 record in pool play. The U.S. lost to Cuba in the semifinals but beat Japan in the bronze-medal match.

At the International Olympic Committee (IOC) meeting on July 8, 2005, baseball and softball were voted out of the 2012 Summer Olympics in London, becoming the first sports voted out of the Olympics since polo was eliminated from the 1936 Summer Olympics. The IOC cited the absence of the best players as the main reason for baseball being dropped from the Olympic program following the 2008 games. Baseball returned to the Olympic program for the 2020 games, held in 2021 in Tokyo. It was not a part of the 2024 games in Paris but is scheduled for the 2028 games in Los Angeles.

=== The first World Baseball Classics ===
==== 2006 ====
On January 17, 2006, the United States announced its provisional 60-man roster (52 players in all) and whittled down the squad mixed with youth and experience to 30 players on February 14, 2006. Sixteen of the 30 Major League Baseball (MLB) clubs were represented on the 2006 squad, including multiple representatives from the New York Yankees (4), Houston Astros (3), Washington Nationals (3), Atlanta Braves (2), Boston Red Sox (2), Chicago Cubs (2), Colorado Rockies (2), Houston Astros (2), and Texas Rangers (2). The fact that four Yankees were selected for the squad irked Yankees owner George Steinbrenner, who was opposed to the WBC being held in the middle of spring training to the point where, at his team's complex in Tampa, Florida, he posted a sign apologizing for their absence and mocking the tournament in the process. MLB Commissioner Bud Selig promptly ordered him to take down the sign the next day.

Manager Buck Martinez brought his 17 years of professional experience as a major league catcher and 1+ seasons as Toronto Blue Jays' (2001–2002) skipper to the U.S. team. Former big-league managers Davey Johnson and Marcel Lachemann served as hitting coach and pitching coach, respectively.

Along with fellow North American rivals Canada and Mexico, the U.S. hosted South Africa. Round One games were held at Chase Field in Phoenix, Arizona, and Scottsdale Stadium in Scottsdale, Arizona. The top two teams advanced to Angel Stadium of Anaheim in Anaheim, California. Despite a surprising loss to Canada, the United States advanced to the second round via tiebreaker. However, second-round losses to South Korea and Mexico allowed Japan to advance over the Americans via tiebreaker. Derek Jeter and Ken Griffey, Jr. were named to the All-World Baseball Classic team.

==== 2009 ====
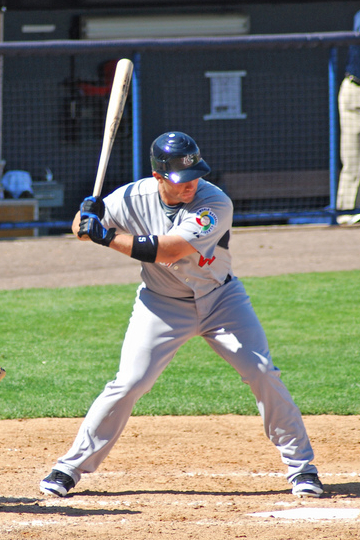
David Wright batting for Team USA at the 2009 World Baseball Classic

The United States competed in Pool C of the 2009 World Baseball Classic along with Italy, Venezuela, and host Canada. The U.S. won the pool opener against Canada by a score of 6–5 and secured advancement into Round 2 by defeating Venezuela in a 15–6 slugfest. Venezuela, however, came back to defeat the U.S. in the championship game of Pool C, 5–3.

On March 14, in their first match of Round 2 against Puerto Rico, in Miami, Florida's Dolphin Stadium, the United States was mercy ruled for the first time in international competition, losing 11–1 in seven innings. Adam Dunn and captain Derek Jeter were among the ones to voice their distaste with the severe beating. Manager Davey Johnson even stated, "I should have stayed there", referencing a wedding he was at earlier in the day.

The United States came on strong the following day against the surprising Netherlands (who had already eliminated a tournament superpower, the Dominican Republic), jumping out to a 6–0 lead in the fourth inning and winning 9–3. With Puerto Rico losing to Venezuela 2–0 the following day, the U.S. faced Puerto Rico once again in the qualifying round, with the loser being eliminated from the tournament. With Puerto Rico leading 5–3 in the 9th inning, singles by Shane Victorino and Brian Roberts and walks by Jimmy Rollins and Kevin Youkilis cut the lead to 5–4. New York Mets third baseman David Wright then looped a barely-fair single into right field that brought in Roberts and Rollins to win the game, 6–5, advancing the U.S. to the semifinals while eliminating Puerto Rico. The United States went on to lose to Japan 9–4 in the second semifinal. Rollins was named to the All-World Baseball Classic team

==== 2013 ====
The United States competed in Pool D of the 2013 World Baseball Classic, along with Italy, Canada, and Mexico. The U.S. team lost to Mexico in the first round, 5–2, but later won games against Canada and Italy, securing their place for the second round, along with Italy, in Pool 2.

On March 12, the United States beat Puerto Rico, 7–1, which then led to a face-off against the Dominican Republic on March 14. Team USA lost, 3–1, thus prompting a game against Puerto Rico once again. The next day Puerto Rico beat the Americans, 4–3, and eliminated them from the tournament. David Wright was named to the All-World Baseball Classic team

The United States came in second in the inaugural WBSC Premier12 tournament in 2015.

=== Classic success and return to the Olympics ===
==== 2017 Classic ====
Team USA won its first game over Colombia, 3–2, in 10 innings on a walk-off single by Adam Jones. Following a loss to the Dominican Republic in which it squandered a 5-run lead, the U.S. defeated Canada to reach the second round.

In the second round, the Americans won the first game by defeating Venezuela, 4–2. In the second game the U.S. was defeated by Puerto Rico, 6–5, after giving up four runs in the first inning. The U.S. then faced the Dominican Republic in a high-stakes, winner-take-all rematch, with a spot in the championship round on the line. Late in the game, with Team USA trailing, Adam Jones delivered a defining moment. Tracking a deep fly ball off the bat of his then-Orioles teammate Manny Machado, Jones leaped into the wall to make the catch, creating an iconic image in the outfield. Building on that pivotal play, Team USA responded with a late-game rally, overcoming the deficit to secure the victory and advance to the next stage.

In the championship round semifinals on March 21, the Americans defeated Japan, 2–1, to advance to their first-ever appearance in the Final. In the final on March 22, the U.S. once again faced Puerto Rico; this time, however, they ended up winning dominantly by a score of 8–0, capturing their first ever World Baseball Classic title. Following the conclusion of the tournament, Eric Hosmer, Christian Yelich, and Marcus Stroman were named to the All-World Baseball Classic team, with Stroman being named World Baseball Classic MVP.

==== 2020 Olympics ====
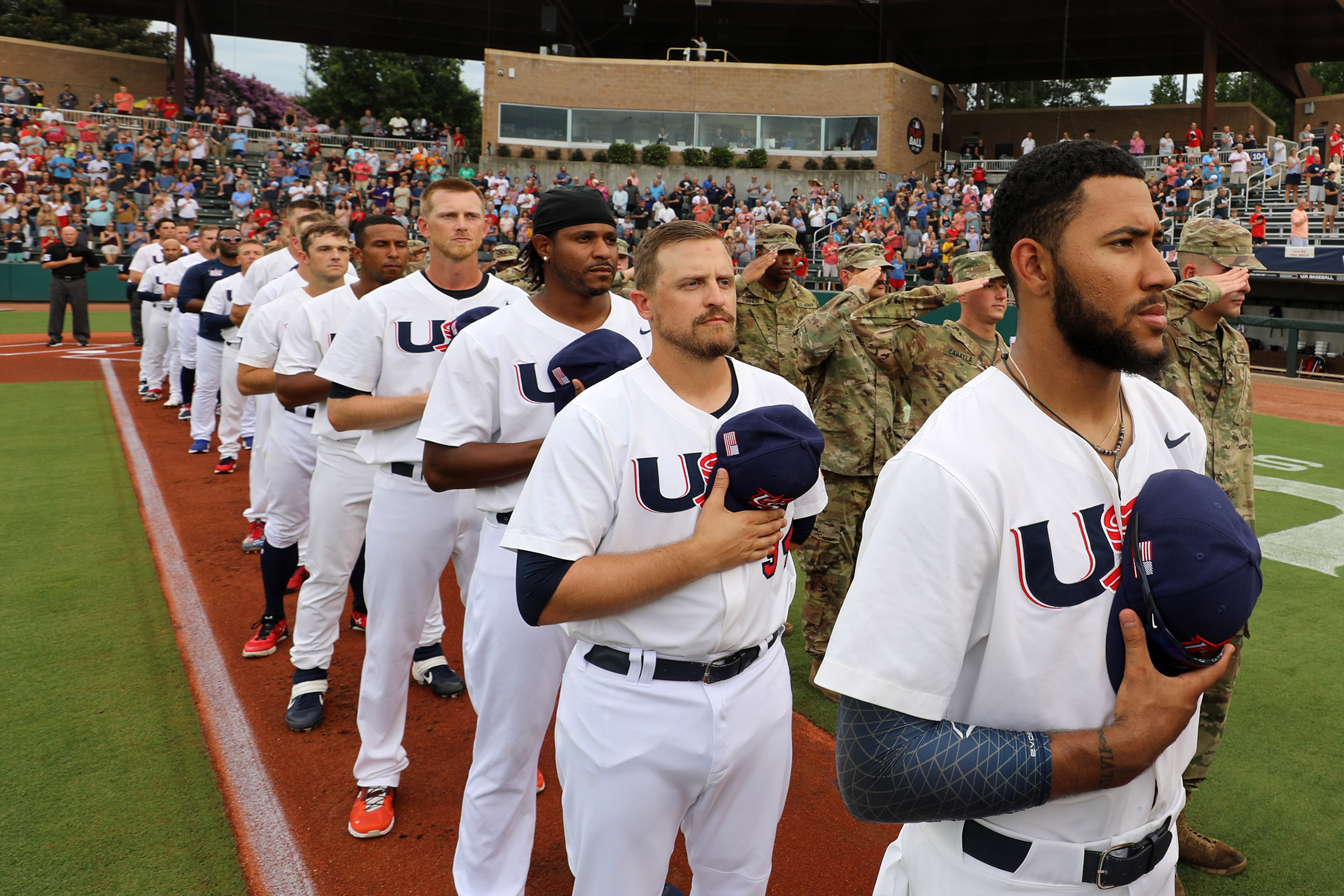
Members of the 2020 Olympic squad before a scrimmage at the USA Baseball National Training Complex in 2021

The United States came in fourth in the 12-team 2019 WBSC Premier12 tournament in November 2019, with Scott Brosius as manager. With third-place Mexico as the top finisher from the Americas in that tournament, the U.S. missed the chance to immediately qualify for the six spots open for the 2020 Olympic Games. The team subsequently qualified, with Mike Scioscia as manager, by winning the Americas Qualifying Event held from May 31 to June 5, 2021, in Florida. Luke Williams led the team in batting average (.444), runs (6), hits (8), and RBIs (6), Todd Frazier and Mark Kolozsvary led in home runs (2), and David Robertson led the team in saves (2).

At the Olympics, the team first won its three-team pool with victories over South Korea and Israel. In the modified double-elimination bracket, the team lost to hosts Japan in the second round, then defeated the Dominican Republic in the repechage and South Korea in the semifinals to advance to the gold medal game, where the team lost to Japan for the second time. Team Japan was made up of players from Nippon Professional Baseball, which paused its season for the Olympics, while Team USA fielded minor-league players and free agents with major-league experience.

==== 2023 Classic ====
At the 2023 World Baseball Classic, Team USA looked to defend their 2017 championship. Multiple-time MLB MVP Mike Trout was named team captain ahead of his first appearance in the tournament. Team USA won their first game in pool play against Great Britain by a score of 6–2. They lost their next game against Mexico by a score of 11–5, which was their only pool-play loss. The United States won their final two games against Canada and Colombia and advanced to the knockout stage.

In their quarterfinal matchup against Venezuela, the Americans were trailing 7–5 in the 8th inning when Trea Turner hit a go-ahead grand slam to win the game, 9–7, to advance to the semifinals. There, the U.S. blew out Cuba, 14–2, and advanced to the championship round for the second tournament in a row.

Team USA's championship round opponent was Japan, creating a highly anticipated matchup. The Americans jumped out to an early 1–0 lead on another Turner home run but couldn't hold on, ultimately falling to Japan, 3–2, as Shohei Ohtani struck out then-teammate Trout to end the game. Turner and Trout were named to the All-WBC team.

==== 2026 Classic ====
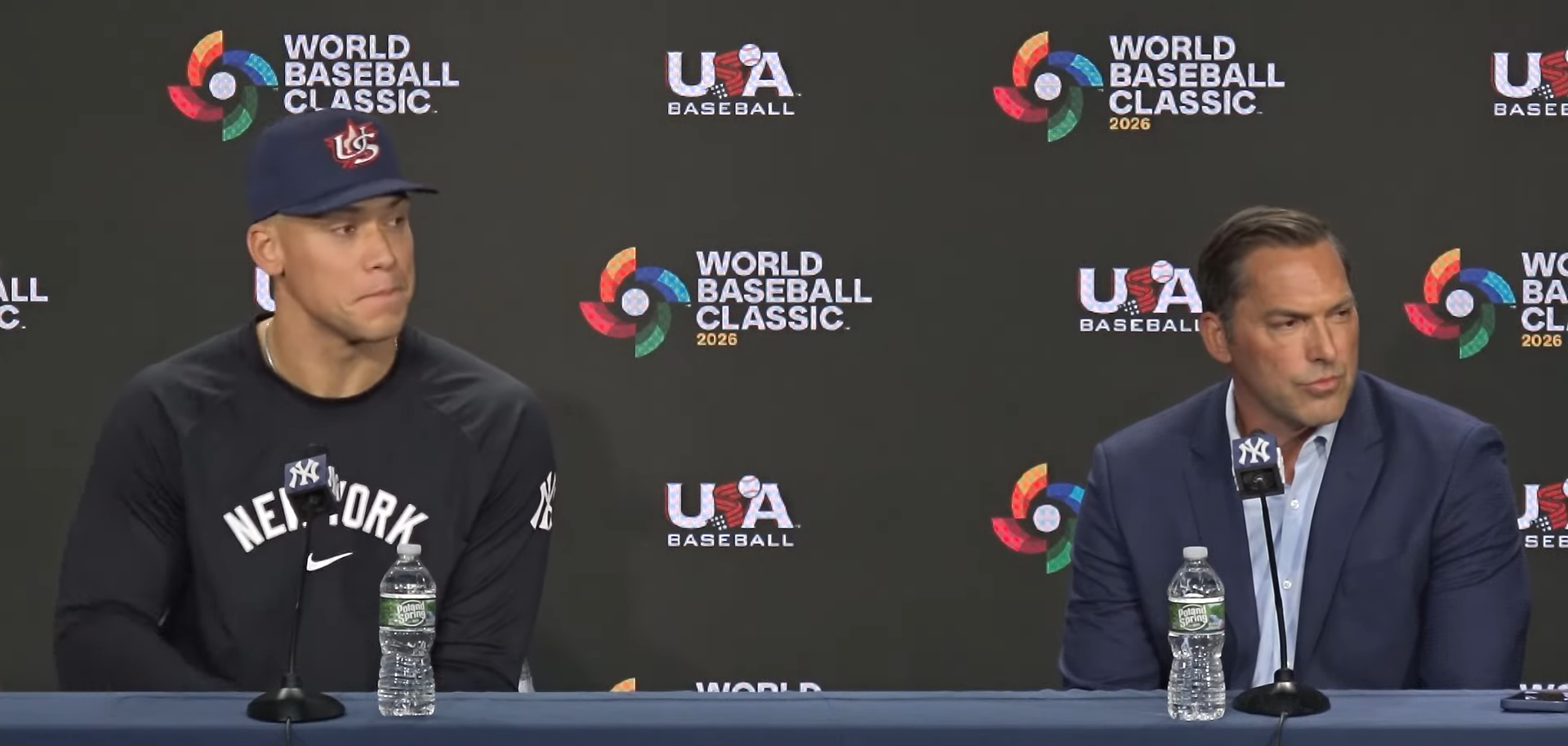
Judge (left) being announced as captain of Team USA ahead of the 2026 World Baseball Classic during a press conference with Mark DeRosa in April 2025

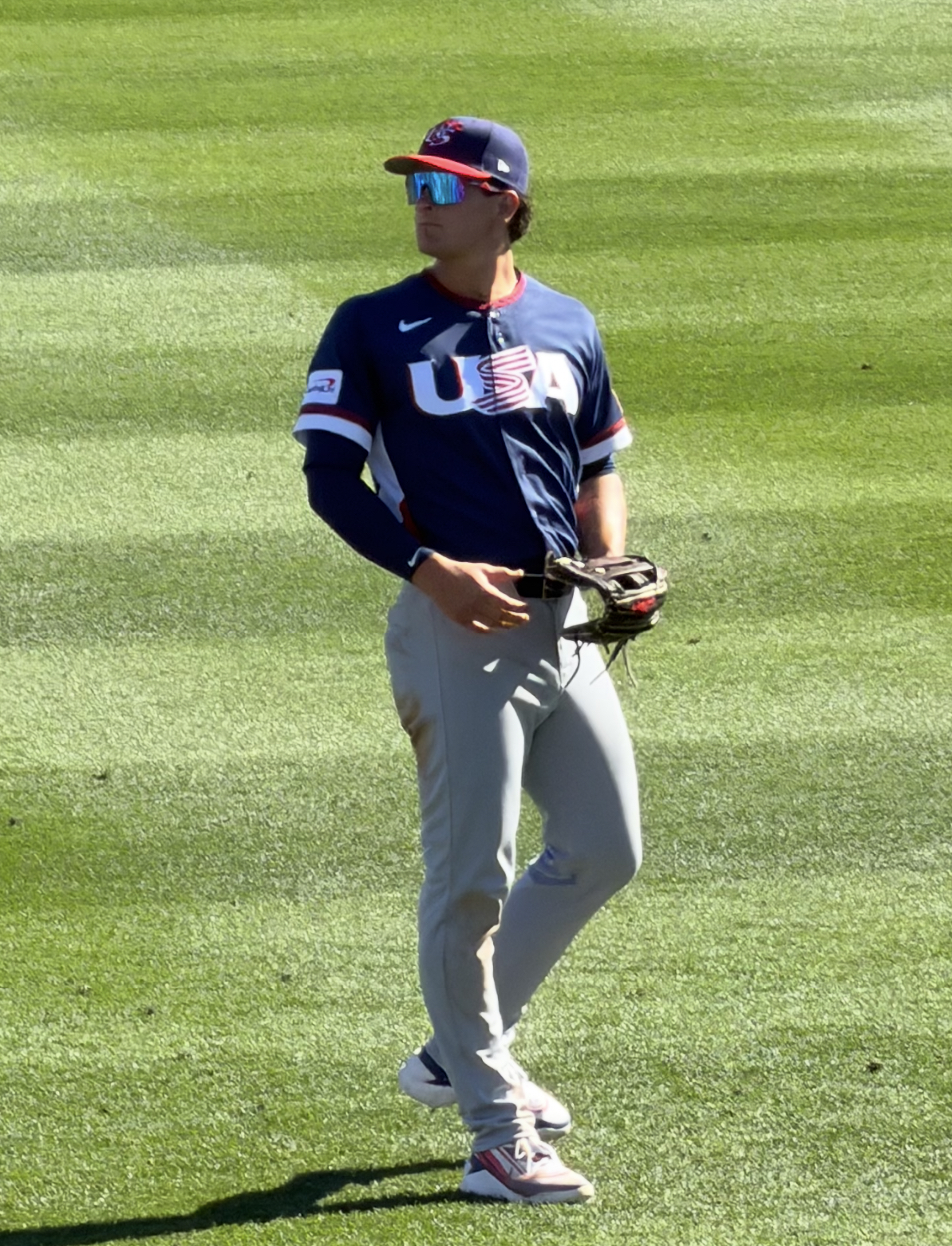
Roman Anthony during an exhibition game

Three-time AL MVP Aaron Judge was named captain of Team USA for the 2026 World Baseball Classic in April 2025. In the months leading up to the tournament, several high-profile players committed to the roster, including Paul Skenes, Tarik Skubal, Cal Raleigh, Bobby Witt Jr., and Bryce Harper.

Team USA finished second in Pool B with a 3–1 record, avenging its 2023 loss to Mexico but losing to Italy. The team went on to defeat Canada in the quarterfinals and the Dominican Republic in a highly anticipated and tightly contested semifinal.

Advancing to the championship game for a third consecutive tournament, Team USA ultimately fell to Venezuela, 3–2, in a close final. Despite entering the tournament with a highly touted offense, the lineup struggled to produce in the final.

Brice Turang, Roman Anthony, Logan Webb, and Skenes were named to the All-Tournament Team. Turang led the tournament with four doubles, while Webb and Skenes tied for the tournament lead in wins with two each.

== Current roster ==
The roster for the 2026 World Baseball Classic.

United States – 2026 World Baseball Classic roster
Players		Coaches
Pitchers: 53 David Bednar; 31 Matthew Boyd; 60 Garrett Cleavinger; 35 Clay Holmes; 48 Griffin Jax; 40 Brad Keller; 22 Clayton Kershaw; 26 Nolan McLean; 19 Mason Miller; 41 Joe Ryan; 30 Paul Skenes; 54 Tim Hill; 55 Gabe Speier; 52 Michael Wacha; 62 Logan Webb; 59 Garrett Whitlock; 44 Ryan Yarbrough	Catchers: 29 Cal Raleigh; 16 Will Smith; Infielders: 2 Alex Bregman; 5 Ernie Clement; 43 Paul Goldschmidt; 24 Bryce Harper; 11 Gunnar Henderson; 13 Brice Turang; 7 Bobby Witt Jr.; Outfielders: 3 Roman Anthony; 25 Byron Buxton; 4 Pete Crow-Armstrong; 99 Aaron Judge ^{(C)}; Designated hitters: 12 Kyle Schwarber	Manager: 9 Mark DeRosa; Coaches: 10 Michael Young (Bench); 46 Andy Pettitte (Pitching); 6 Matt Holliday (Hitting); 21 Sean Casey (Hitting); 23 George Lombard (First base); 91 Dino Ebel (Third base); 8 David Ross (Bullpen); 33 Fredi González (Assistant Manager); 32 Brian McCann (Assistant Manager); 30 active; (16 pitchers, 14 position players)

== Results and fixtures ==
The following is a list of professional baseball game results active in the latest version of the WBSC World Rankings, as well as any future matches that have been scheduled and games dating back to 2019.

Legend

Win Lose Void or postponed Fixture

=== 2019 ===
WBSC Premier12 GS	November 2	Netherlands	0–9	United States	Estadio Panamericano, Mexico
WBSC Premier12 GS	12:00 CT		Boxscore		Attendance: 3,015

WBSC Premier12 GS	November 3	Mexico	3–2	United States	Estadio Panamericano, Mexico
WBSC Premier12 GS	19:00 CT		Boxscore		Attendance: 10,123

WBSC Premier12 GS	November 4	United States	10–8	Dominican Republic	Estadio Panamericano, Mexico
WBSC Premier12 GS	19:00 CT		Boxscore		Attendance: 3,102

WBSC Premier12 SR	November 11	United States	1–5	South Korea	Tokyo Dome, Japan
WBSC Premier12 SR	19:00 JT		Boxscore		Attendance: 3,012

WBSC Premier12 SR	November 12	United States	4–3	Japan	Tokyo Dome, Japan
WBSC Premier12 SR	19:00 JT		Boxscore		Attendance: 27,827

WBSC Premier12 SR	November 13	Australia	2–1	United States	Tokyo Dome, Japan
WBSC Premier12 SR	12:00 JT		Boxscore		Attendance: 2,149

WBSC Premier12 SR	November 15	Chinese Taipei	2–3	United States	Tokyo Dome, Japan
WBSC Premier12 SR	12:00 JT		Boxscore		Attendance: 4,967

WBSC Premier12 3rd	November 17	United States	2–3 (F/10)	Mexico	Tokyo Dome, Japan
WBSC Premier12 3rd	12:00 JT		Boxscore		Attendance: 0

=== 2021 ===
2020 Summer Olympics GS	July 30	United States	8–1	Israel	Yokohama Stadium, Japan
2020 Summer Olympics GS	19:00 JT	WP: Joe Ryan; HR: Tyler Austin (1)	Boxscore	LP: Joey Wagman; HR: Danny Valencia (1)

2020 Summer Olympics GS	July 31	South Korea	2–4	United States	Yokohama Stadium, Japan
2020 Summer Olympics GS	19:00 JT	LP: Ko Young-pyo	Boxscore	WP: Nick Martinez; Sv: David Robertson (1); HR: Triston Casas (1), Nick Allen (1)

2020 Summer Olympics R2	August 2	United States	6–7 (F/10)	Japan	Yokohama Stadium, Japan
2020 Summer Olympics R2	19:00 JT	LP: Edwin Jackson; HR: Triston Casas (2)	Boxscore	WP: Ryoji Kuribayashi; HR: Seiya Suzuki (1)

2020 Summer Olympics R2R	August 4	Dominican Republic	1–3	United States	Yokohama Stadium, Japan
2020 Summer Olympics R2R	12:00 JT	LP: Denyi Reyes; HR: Charlie Valerio (1)	Boxscore	WP: Scott Kazmir; Sv: David Robertson (2); HR: Triston Casas (3), Tyler Austin (2)

2020 Summer Olympics SF	August 5	South Korea	2–7	United States	Yokohama Stadium, Japan
2020 Summer Olympics SF	19:00 JT	LP: Lee Eui-lee	Boxscore	WP: Ryder Ryan; HR: Jamie Westbrook (1)

2020 Summer Olympics Gold	August 7	United States	0–2	Japan	Yokohama Stadium, Japan
2020 Summer Olympics Gold	19:00 JT	LP: Nick Martinez	Boxscore	WP: Masato Morishita; Sv: Ryoji Kuribayashi (3); HR: Munetaka Murakami (1)

=== 2022 ===
Haarlem Week GS	July 9	United States	0–1 (F/8)	Japan	Haarlem, Netherlands
Haarlem Week GS	13:00 CET		Boxscore

Haarlem Week GS	July 10	Italy	0–9	United States	Haarlem, Netherlands
Haarlem Week GS	12:00 CET		Boxscore

Haarlem Week GS	July 11	Cuba	0–2	United States	Haarlem, Netherlands
Haarlem Week GS	19:30 CET		Boxscore

Haarlem Week GS	July 12	Netherlands	0–10 (F/6)	United States	Haarlem, Netherlands
Haarlem Week GS	19:30 CET		Boxscore

Haarlem Week GS	July 13	United States	2–3	Curaçao	Haarlem, Netherlands
Haarlem Week GS	15:30 CET		Boxscore

Haarlem Week SF	July 14	United States	2–3 (F/10)	Curaçao	Haarlem, Netherlands
Haarlem Week SF	15:30 CET		Boxscore

Haarlem Week 3rd	July 15	United States	5–1	Japan	Haarlem, Netherlands
Haarlem Week 3rd	15:30 CET		Boxscore

=== 2023 ===
World Baseball Classic GS	March 11	Great Britain	2–6	United States	Chase Field, United States
World Baseball Classic GS	19:00 MT	LP: Vance Worley (0–1); HR: Trayce Thompson (1)	Boxscore	WP: Adam Wainwright (1–0); HR: Kyle Schwarber (1)	Attendance: 39,650; Umpires: HP – Carlos Torres, 1B – Felix Tejada, 2B – Bill Miller, 3B – Jhonatan Biarreta

World Baseball Classic GS	March 12	Mexico	11–5	United States	Chase Field, United States
World Baseball Classic GS	19:00 MT	WP: Patrick Sandoval (1–0); HR: Joey Meneses (2)	Boxscore	LP: Nick Martinez (0–1); HR: Will Smith (1)	Attendance: 47,534; Umpires: HP: Alan Porter. 1B: Jairo Mendoza. 2B: Edwin Louisa. 3B: Cory Blaser.

World Baseball Classic GS	March 13	Canada	1–12 (F/7)	United States	Chase Field, United States
World Baseball Classic GS	19:00 MT	LP: Mitch Bratt (0–1); HR: Jared Young (1)	Boxscore	WP: Lance Lynn (1–0); HR: Mike Trout (1), Trea Turner (1)	Attendance: 29,621; Umpires: HP – Bill Miller, 1B – Edwin Louisa, 2B – Alan Porter, 3B – Jairo Mendoza

World Baseball Classic GS	March 15	United States	3–2	Colombia	Chase Field, United States
World Baseball Classic GS	19:00 MT	WP: Kendall Graveman (1–0); Sv: Ryan Pressly (1)	Boxscore	LP: Ruben Galindo (0–1)	Attendance: 29,856; Umpires: HP – Alan Porter, 1B – Bill Miller, 2B – Jairo Mendoza, 3B – Roberto Peralta

World Baseball Classic QF	March 18	United States	9–7	Venezuela	loanDepot Park, United States
World Baseball Classic QF	19:00 ET	WP: David Bednar (1–0); Sv: Ryan Pressly (2); HR: Kyle Tucker (1), Trea Turner (2)	Boxscore	LP: José Quijada (0–1); HR: Luis Arráez 2 (2)	Attendance: 35,792; Umpires: HP: Dan Bellino. 1B: Will Little. 2B: Atsushi Fukaya. 3B: Kun Young Park.

World Baseball Classic SF	March 19	Cuba	2–14	United States	loanDepot Park, United States
World Baseball Classic SF	19:00 ET	LP: Roenis Elías (0–1)	Boxscore	WP: Adam Wainwright (2–0); HR: Paul Goldschmidt (1), Trea Turner 2 (4), Cedric Mullins (1)	Attendance: 35,779; Umpires: HP – John Tumpane, 1B – Quinn Wolcott, 2B – Lance Barksdale, 3B – Jong Chui Park, LF – Ramiro Alfaro, RF – Edward Pinales

World Baseball Classic F	March 21	United States	2–3	Japan	loanDepot Park, United States
World Baseball Classic F	19:00 ET	LP: Merrill Kelly (0–1); HR: Trea Turner (5), Kyle Schwarber (2)	Boxscore	WP: Shōta Imanaga (1–0); Sv: Shohei Ohtani (1); HR: Munetaka Murakami (1), Kazuma Okamoto (2)	Attendance: 36,098; Umpires: HP – Lance Barksdale, 1B – John Tumpane, 2B – Edward Pinales, 3B – Ramiro Alfaro, LF – Jong Chui Park, RF – Quinn Wolcott

=== 2024 ===
WBSC Premier12 GS	November 9	Puerto Rico	1–0	United States	Tepic, Mexico
WBSC Premier12 GS	16:00 CT	WP: Raymond Burgos	Boxscore	LP: Sam Benschoter	Attendance: 7,820

WBSC Premier12 GS	November 10	Netherlands	2–12	United States	Tepic, Mexico
WBSC Premier12 GS	16:00 CT	LP: Kaj Timmermans	Boxscore	WP: Antonio Menendez	Attendance: 5,133

WBSC Premier12 GS	November 11	United States	3–5	Venezuela	Tepic, Mexico
WBSC Premier12 GS	19:00 CT	LP: Eric Adler	Boxscore	WP: Mario Sanchez	Attendance: 7,018

WBSC Premier12 GS	November 12	Panama	3–9	United States	Tepic, Mexico
WBSC Premier12 GS	19:00 CT	LP: Bryan Caceres	Boxscore	WP: Sam Benschoter	Attendance: 4,320

WBSC Premier12 GS	November 14	United States	12–2	Mexico	Zapopan, Mexico
WBSC Premier12 GS	20:00 CT	WP: Antonio Menendez	Boxscore	LP: Luis Miranda	Attendance: 9,721

WBSC Premier12 SR	November 21	United States	1–9	Japan	Tokyo, Japan
WBSC Premier12 SR	19:00 JT	LP: Darrell Thompson	Boxscore	WP: Chihiro Sumida	Attendance: 25,428

WBSC Premier12 SR	November 22	Chinese Taipei	8–2	United States	Tokyo, Japan
WBSC Premier12 SR	12:00 JT	WP: Chiang Kuo-Hao	Boxscore	LP: Sam Benschoter	Attendance: 9,472

WBSC Premier12 SR	November 23	United States	6–5	Venezuela	Tokyo, Japan
WBSC Premier12 SR	12:00 JT	WP: Zane Mills	Boxscore	LP: Enderson Franco	Attendance: 8,868

WBSC Premier12 3rd	November 24	United States	6–1	Venezuela	Tokyo, Japan
WBSC Premier12 3rd	12:00 JT	WP: Casey Lawrence	Boxscore	LP: Mario Sanchez	Attendance: 8,386

=== 2026 ===
Friendly	March 3	United States	15–1 (F/10)	San Francisco Giants	Phoenix, United States
Friendly	13:05 MST	WP: Paul Skenes (1–0); HR: Alex Bregman (1), Roman Anthony (1)	Boxscore	LP: Adrian Houser (0–1)	Attendance: 9,720; Umpires: HP – Alfonso Márquez, 1B – Adrian Johnson, 2B – Scott Barry, 3B – Brian Walsh

Friendly	March 4	United States	14–4 (F/8)	Colorado Rockies	Phoenix, United States
Friendly	13:10 MST	WP: Carson Skipper (1–0); HR: Aaron Judge (1), Alex Bregman (2), Will Smith (1), Paul Goldschmidt (1), Byron Buxton (1)	Boxscore	LP: Gabriel Hughes (0–1); HR: Mickey Moniak (1), Kyle Karros (1)	Attendance: 11,803; Umpires: HP – Dan Bellino, 1B – Chris Guccione, 2B – Scott Barry, 3B – Rob Drake

World Baseball Classic GS	March 6	United States	15–5	Brazil	Houston, United States
World Baseball Classic GS	19:00 CT	WP: Logan Webb (1−0); HR: Aaron Judge (1)	Boxscore	LP: Bo Takahashi (0−1); HR: Lucas Ramirez 2 (2), Victor Mascai (1)	Attendance: 30,825; Umpires: HP − Brennan Miller, 1B − Adrian Johnson, 2B − Cesar Quintana, 3B − Zdeněk Zidek

World Baseball Classic GS	March 7	Great Britain	1–9	United States	Houston, United States
World Baseball Classic GS	19:00 CT	HR: Nate Eaton (1)	Boxscore	WP: Clay Holmes (1−0); LP: Andre Scrubb (0−1); HR: Kyle Schwarber (1)	Attendance: 34,368; Umpires: HP - Alex Tosi, 1B - David Arrieta, 2B - Scott Barry, 3B - Robert Nunez

World Baseball Classic GS	March 9	Mexico	3–5	United States	Houston, United States
World Baseball Classic GS	19:00 CT	LP: Jesus Cruz (0–1); HR: Jarren Duran (2)	Boxscore	WP: Paul Skenes (1–0); Sv: Garrett Whitlock (1); HR: Aaron Judge (2), Roman Anthony (1)	Attendance: 41,628; Umpires: HP − Adrian Johnson, 1B − Chun Il-soo, 2B − Roberto Ortiz, 3B − David Arrieta

World Baseball Classic GS	March 10	Italy	8–6	United States	Houston, United States
World Baseball Classic GS	20:00 CT	HR: Pete Crow-Armstrong (2), Gunnar Henderson(1)	Boxscore	WP: Michael Lorenzen (1-0); Sv: Greg Weissert (2); LP: Nolan McLean (0-1); HR: Sam Antonacci (1), Jac Caglianone (1), Kyle Teel (1)	Attendance: 38,653; Umpires: HP - Roberto Ortiz, 1B - Scott Barry, 2B - Robert Nunez, 3B - Cesar Quintana

World Baseball Classic QF	March 13	United States	5–3	Canada	Houston, United States
World Baseball Classic QF	19:00 CT	WP: Logan Webb (2−0); Sv: Mason Miller (1)	Boxscore	LP: Michael Soroka (1−1); HR: Bo Naylor (1)	Attendance: 38,054; Umpires: HP − Bill Miller, 1B − Carlos Torres, 2B − Zdeněk Zidek, 3B − Jon Byrne

World Baseball Classic SF	March 15	United States	2–1	Dominican Republic	Miami, United States
World Baseball Classic SF	20:00 CT	WP: Paul Skenes (2−0); Sv: Mason Miller (2); HR: Gunnar Henderson (2), Roman Anthony (1)	Boxscore	LP: Gregory Soto (0−1); HR: Junior Caminero (3)	Attendance: 36,337; Umpires: HP − Cory Blaser, 1B − Jeremie Rehak, 2B − Dan Bellino, 3B − Delfin Colon, LF − Cuti Suárez, RF − Chris Graham

World Baseball Classic F	March 17	Venezuela	3–2	United States	Miami, United States
World Baseball Classic F	20:00 CT	WP: Andrés Machado (1–0); Sv: Daniel Palencia (3); HR: Wilyer Abreu (2)	Boxscore	LP: Garrett Whitlock (0–1); HR: Bryce Harper (1)	Attendance: 36,190; Umpires: HP: Dan Bellino, 1B: Cory Blaser, 2B: Jeremie Rehak, 3B: Chris Graham, LF: Delfin Colon, RF: Cuti Suarez

== Competitive record ==
=== World Baseball Classic ===
In 2005, Major League Baseball (MLB) announced the formation of the World Baseball Classic, a 16-nation international competition to be held in March 2006 for the first time. The tournament was the first of its kind to have the national teams of IBAF's member federations feature professional players from the major leagues around the world, including MLB.

World Baseball Classic record									Qualification record			
Year	Result	Position	Pld	W	L	RS	RA	Squad	W	L	RS	RA
(United States) 2006	Quarterfinals	8th	6	3	3	33	20	Squad	No qualifiers held			
(United States) 2009	Fourth Place	4th	8	4	4	50	54	Squad	No qualifiers held			
(United States) 2013	Quarterfinals	6th	6	3	3	28	19	Squad	Automatically qualified			
(United States) 2017	Champions	1st	8	6	2	41	21	Squad	Automatically qualified			
(United States) 2023	Runners-up	2nd	7	5	2	51	28	Squad	Automatically qualified			
(United States) 2026	Runners-up	2nd	7	5	2	44	24	Squad	Automatically qualified			
Total	1 Title	6/6	42	26	16	247	166	—	—	—	—	—

==== Record by team ====
Team	WBC Tournament						
Team	GP	W	L	Pct.	RF	RA	RD
Brazil	1	1	0	1.000	15	5	+10
Canada	6	5	1	0.833	46	21	+25
Colombia	2	2	0	1.000	6	4	+2
Cuba	1	1	0	1.000	14	2	+12
Dominican Republic	4	2	2	0.500	14	14	0
Great Britain	2	2	0	1.000	15	3	+12
Italy	2	1	1	0.500	12	10	+2
Japan	4	2	2	0.500	12	16	−4
Mexico	5	2	3	0.400	15	21	−6
Netherlands	1	1	0	1.000	9	3	+6
Puerto Rico	6	3	3	0.500	30	27	+3
South Africa	1	1	0	1.000	17	0	+17
South Korea	1	0	1	0.000	3	7	−4
Venezuela	6	3	3	0.500	39	33	+6
Total	42	26	16	0.619	247	166	+81

2006 WBC Results

March 7; 1st Round, Pool B – Game 1	Mexico	0–2	United States	United States Chase Field; Attendance: 32,727
March 7; 1st Round, Pool B – Game 1		Boxscore		United States Chase Field; Attendance: 32,727

March 8; 1st Round, Pool D – Game 3	Canada	8–6	United States	United States Chase Field; Attendance: 16,993
March 8; 1st Round, Pool D – Game 3		Boxscore		United States Chase Field; Attendance: 16,993

March 10; 1st Round, Pool D – Game 6	United States	17–0 (F/5)	South Africa	United States Scottsdale Stadium; Attendance: 11,975
March 10; 1st Round, Pool D – Game 6		Boxscore		United States Scottsdale Stadium; Attendance: 11,975

March 12; 2nd Round, Pool 1 – Game 1	Japan	3–4	United States	United States Angel Stadium of Anaheim; Attendance: 32,896
March 12; 2nd Round, Pool 1 – Game 1		Boxscore		United States Angel Stadium of Anaheim; Attendance: 32,896

March 13; 2nd Round, Pool 2 – Game 3	United States	3–7	South Korea	United States Angel Stadium of Anaheim; Attendance: 21,288
March 13; 2nd Round, Pool 2 – Game 3		Boxscore		United States Angel Stadium of Anaheim; Attendance: 21,288

March 16; 2nd Round, Pool 2 – Game 5	United States	1–2	Mexico	United States Angel Stadium of Anaheim; Attendance: 38,284
March 16; 2nd Round, Pool 2 – Game 5		Boxscore		United States Angel Stadium of Anaheim; Attendance: 38,284

2009 WBC Results

March 7; 1st Round, Pool C – Game 1	Canada	5–6	United States	Canada Rogers Centre; Attendance: 42,314
March 7; 1st Round, Pool C – Game 1		Boxscore		Canada Rogers Centre; Attendance: 42,314

March 8; 1st Round, Pool D – Game 3	United States	15–6	Venezuela	Canada Rogers Centre; Attendance: 13,094
March 8; 1st Round, Pool D – Game 3		Boxscore		Canada Rogers Centre; Attendance: 13,094

March 11; 1st Round, Pool D – Game 6	Venezuela	5–3	United States	Canada Rogers Centre; Attendance: 12,358
March 11; 1st Round, Pool D – Game 6		Boxscore		Canada Rogers Centre; Attendance: 12,358

March 14; 2nd Round, Pool 1 – Game 2	United States	1–11 (F/7)	Puerto Rico	United States Dolphin Stadium; Attendance: 30,595
March 14; 2nd Round, Pool 1 – Game 2		Boxscore		United States Dolphin Stadium; Attendance: 30,595

March 15; 2nd Round, Pool 2 – Game 3	Netherlands	3–9	United States	United States Dolphin Stadium; Attendance: 11,059
March 15; 2nd Round, Pool 2 – Game 3		Boxscore		United States Dolphin Stadium; Attendance: 11,059

March 17; 2nd Round, Pool 2 – Game 5	Puerto Rico	5–6	United States	United States Dolphin Stadium; Attendance: 13,224
March 17; 2nd Round, Pool 2 – Game 5		Boxscore		United States Dolphin Stadium; Attendance: 13,224

March 18; 2nd Round, Pool 2 – Game 6	United States	6–10	Venezuela	United States Dolphin Stadium; Attendance: 16,575
March 18; 2nd Round, Pool 2 – Game 6		Boxscore		United States Dolphin Stadium; Attendance: 16,575

March 22; Semifinals	United States	4–9	Japan	United States Dodger Stadium; Attendance: 43,630
March 22; Semifinals		Boxscore		United States Dodger Stadium; Attendance: 43,630

2013 WBC Results

March 8; 1st Round, Pool D – Game C	Mexico	5–2	United States	United States Chase Field; Attendance: 44,256
March 8; 1st Round, Pool D – Game C		Boxscore		United States Chase Field; Attendance: 44,256

March 9; 1st Round, Pool D – Game 5	Italy	2–6	United States	United States Chase Field; Attendance: 19,303
March 9; 1st Round, Pool D – Game 5		Boxscore		United States Chase Field; Attendance: 19,303

March 10; 1st Round, Pool D – Game 6	United States	9–4	Canada	United States Chase Field; Attendance: 22,425
March 10; 1st Round, Pool D – Game 6		Boxscore		United States Chase Field; Attendance: 22,425

March 14; 2nd Round, Pool 2 – Game 2	Puerto Rico	1–7	United States	United States Marlins Park; Attendance: 32,872
March 14; 2nd Round, Pool 2 – Game 2		Boxscore		United States Marlins Park; Attendance: 32,872

March 15; 2nd Round, Pool 2 – Game 4	Dominican Republic	3–1	United States	United States Marlins Park; Attendance: 34,366.
March 15; 2nd Round, Pool 2 – Game 4		Boxscore		United States Marlins Park; Attendance: 34,366.

March 16; 2nd Round, Pool 2 – Game 5	Puerto Rico	4–3	United States	United States Marlins Park; Attendance: 19,762
March 16; 2nd Round, Pool 2 – Game 5		Boxscore		United States Marlins Park; Attendance: 19,762

2017 WBC Results

March 10; 1st Round, Pool C – Game 2	Colombia	2–3	United States	United States Marlins Park; Attendance: 22,580
March 10; 1st Round, Pool C – Game 2		Boxscore		United States Marlins Park; Attendance: 22,580

March 11; 1st Round, Pool C – Game 4	United States	5–7	Dominican Republic	United States Marlins Park; Attendance: 37,446
March 11; 1st Round, Pool C – Game 4		Boxscore		United States Marlins Park; Attendance: 37,446

March 12; 1st Round, Pool C – Game 6	Canada	0–8	United States	United States Marlins Park; Attendance: 22,303
March 12; 1st Round, Pool C – Game 6		Boxscore		United States Marlins Park; Attendance: 22,303

March 15; 2nd Round, Pool F – Game 2	Venezuela	2–4	United States	United States Petco Park; Attendance: 16,635
March 15; 2nd Round, Pool F – Game 2		Boxscore		United States Petco Park; Attendance: 16,635

March 17; 2nd Round, Pool 2 – Game 4	United States	5–6	Puerto Rico	United States Petco Park; Attendance: 34,463
March 17; 2nd Round, Pool 2 – Game 4		Boxscore		United States Petco Park; Attendance: 34,463

March 18; 2nd Round, Pool 2 – Game 6	Dominican Republic	3–6	United States	United States Petco Park; Attendance: 43,002
March 18; 2nd Round, Pool 2 – Game 6		Boxscore		United States Petco Park; Attendance: 43,002

March 21; Semifinals	United States	2–1	Japan	United States Dodger Stadium; Attendance: 33,462
March 21; Semifinals		Boxscore		United States Dodger Stadium; Attendance: 33,462

March 22; Finals	United States	8–0	Puerto Rico	United States Dodger Stadium; Attendance: 51,565
March 22; Finals		Boxscore		United States Dodger Stadium; Attendance: 51,565

2023 WBC Results

March 11th 10:00 P.M. EST, 7:00 P.M. PST; Pool C, Game 1	Great Britain	2–6	United States	Chase Field, Phoenix Arizona; Attendance: 39,650
March 11th 10:00 P.M. EST, 7:00 P.M. PST; Pool C, Game 1		Boxscore		Chase Field, Phoenix Arizona; Attendance: 39,650

March 12th 10:00 P.M. EST, 7:00 P.M. PST; Pool C, Game 2	Mexico	11–5	United States	Chase Field, Phoenix Arizona; Attendance: 47,534
March 12th 10:00 P.M. EST, 7:00 P.M. PST; Pool C, Game 2		Boxscore		Chase Field, Phoenix Arizona; Attendance: 47,534

March 13th 10:00 P.M. EST, 7:00 P.M. PST; Pool C, Game 3	Canada	1–12 (F/7)	United States	Chase Field, Phoenix Arizona; Attendance: 29,621
March 13th 10:00 P.M. EST, 7:00 P.M. PST; Pool C, Game 3		Boxscore		Chase Field, Phoenix Arizona; Attendance: 29,621

March 15th 10:00 P.M. EST, 7:00 P.M. PST; Pool C, Game 4	United States	3–2	Colombia	Chase Field, Phoenix Arizona; Attendance: 29,856
March 15th 10:00 P.M. EST, 7:00 P.M. PST; Pool C, Game 4		Boxscore		Chase Field, Phoenix Arizona; Attendance: 29,856

March 18th 7:00 P.M. EST, 4:00 P.M. PST; Quarterfinals	United States	9–7	Venezuela	Marlins Park, Miami, Florida; Attendance: 35,782
March 18th 7:00 P.M. EST, 4:00 P.M. PST; Quarterfinals		Boxscore		Marlins Park, Miami, Florida; Attendance: 35,782

March 19th 7:00 P.M. EST, 4:00 P.M. PST; Semifinals	Cuba	2–14	United States	Marlins Park, Miami, Florida; Attendance: 35,779
March 19th 7:00 P.M. EST, 4:00 P.M. PST; Semifinals		Boxscore		Marlins Park, Miami, Florida; Attendance: 35,779

March 21st 7:00 P.M. EST, 4:00 P.M. PST; Finals	United States	2–3	Japan	Marlins Park, Miami, Florida; Attendance: 36,098
March 21st 7:00 P.M. EST, 4:00 P.M. PST; Finals		Boxscore		Marlins Park, Miami, Florida; Attendance: 36,098

2026 WBC Results

March 6th 19:00 CST; Pool B, Game 2	United States	15–5	Brazil	Daikin Park, Houston, Texas; Attendance: 30,825
March 6th 19:00 CST; Pool B, Game 2		Boxscore		Daikin Park, Houston, Texas; Attendance: 30,825

March 7th : 19:00 CST; Pool B, Game 4	Great Britain	1–9	United States	Daikin Park, Houston, Texas; Attendance: 34,368
March 7th : 19:00 CST; Pool B, Game 4		Boxscore		Daikin Park, Houston, Texas; Attendance: 34,368

March 9th : 19:00 CDT; Pool B, Game 8	Mexico	3–5	United States	Daikin Park, Houston, Texas; Attendance: 41,628
March 9th : 19:00 CDT; Pool B, Game 8		Boxscore		Daikin Park, Houston, Texas; Attendance: 41,628

March 10th : 20:00 CDT; Pool B, Game 9	Italy	8–6	United States	Daikin Park, Houston, Texas; Attendance: 38,653
March 10th : 20:00 CDT; Pool B, Game 9		Boxscore		Daikin Park, Houston, Texas; Attendance: 38,653

March 13th : 19:00 CDT; Quarterfinals	United States	5–3	Canada	Daikin Park, Houston, Texas; Attendance: 38,054
March 13th : 19:00 CDT; Quarterfinals		Boxscore		Daikin Park, Houston, Texas; Attendance: 38,054

March 15th : 20:00 CDT; Semifinals	United States	2–1	Dominican Republic	LoanDepot Park, Miami, Florida; Attendance: 36,337
March 15th : 20:00 CDT; Semifinals		Boxscore		LoanDepot Park, Miami, Florida; Attendance: 36,337

March 17th : 20:00 CDT; Finals	Venezuela	3–2	United States	LoanDepot Park, Miami, Florida; Attendance: 36,190
March 17th : 20:00 CDT; Finals		Boxscore		LoanDepot Park, Miami, Florida; Attendance: 36,190

=== Olympic Games ===
Summer Olympics record								Qualification record
Year	Result	Position	W	L	%	RS	RA	Method
(Sweden) 1912	Exhibition only		1	0	1.000	13	3	No qualifiers held
(Finland) 1952	Did not enter							No qualifiers held
(Australia) 1956	Exhibition only		1	0	1.000	11	5	No qualifiers held
(Japan) 1964	Exhibition only		1	0	1.000	5	2	No qualifiers held
(United States) 1984	Finals	2nd (Note: No medals awarded; tournament was a demonstration sport only)	4	1	.800	38	16	Qualified as hosts
(South Korea) 1988	Finals	1st	4	1	.800	36	20	1987 Pan American Games
(Spain) 1992	Fourth Place	4th	5	4	.556	53	39	1991 Pan American Games
(United States) 1996	Bronze medal	3rd	7	2	.778	93	41	Qualified as hosts
(Australia) 2000	Gold medal	1st	8	1	.889	49	16	1999 Pan American Games
(Greece) 2004	Did not qualify							Lost Americas Qualifying Tournament
(China) 2008	Bronze medal	3rd	6	3	.667	54	35	Won Americas Qualifying Tournament
(Japan) 2020	Silver medal	2nd	4	2	.667	28	15	Won Americas Qualifying Event
(United States) 2028	Qualified as hosts							Qualified as hosts
Total (Note: Totals only include years 1992 to 2008 and 2020, during which baseball was an official medal sport.)	1 Title	6/7	30	12	.714	277	146	

1992 USA Baseball Olympic Team

Pitchers (8):

- Willie Adams, Stanford
- Jeff Alkire (L), Miami
- Darren Dreifort, Wichita State
- Rick Greene, LSU
- Rick Helling, Stanford
- Daron Kirkreit, UC Riverside
- Ron Villone (L), UMass
- B. J. Wallace (L), Mississippi State

Pitcher / Outfielder (1):

- Chris Roberts (L), Florida State

Catchers (2):

- Charles Johnson, Miami
- Jason Varitek, Georgia Tech

Infielders (6):

- Nomar Garciaparra, Georgia Tech
- Jason Giambi, Long Beach State
- Phil Nevin, Cal State Fullerton
- Michael Tucker, Longwood
- Craig Wilson, Kansas State
- Chris Wimmer, Wichita State

Outfielders (3):

- Jeffrey Hammonds, Stanford
- Chad McConnell, Creighton
- Calvin Murray, Texas

Manager: Ron Fraser, Miami

Note: Jason Moler of Cal State Fullerton was initially named to the squad as one of the catchers, but was replaced by Varitek due to injury prior to the start of the competition.

1996 USA Baseball Olympic Team
- Chad Allen
- Kris Benson
- R. A. Dickey
- Troy Glaus
- Chad Green
- Seth Greisinger
- Kip Harkrider
- A. J. Hinch
- Jacque Jones
- Billy Koch
- Mark Kotsay
- Matt LeCroy
- Travis Lee
- Brian Loyd
- Braden Looper
- Warren Morris
- Augie Ojeda
- Jim Parque
- Jeff Weaver
- Jason Williams

Manager: Skip Bertman

2000 USA Baseball Olympic Team
- Brent Abernathy
- Kurt Ainsworth
- Pat Borders
- Sean Burroughs
- John Cotton
- Travis Dawkins
- Adam Everett
- Ryan Franklin
- Chris George
- Shane Heams
- Marcus Jensen
- Mike Kinkade
- Rick Krivda
- Doug Mientkiewicz
- Mike Neill
- Roy Oswalt
- Jon Rauch
- Anthony Sanders
- Bobby Seay
- Ben Sheets
- Brad Wilkerson
- Todd Williams
- Ernie Young
- Tim Young

Manager: Tommy Lasorda

2008 USA Baseball Olympic Team

2008 USA Baseball Olympic Team roster
Players		Coaches
Pitchers: 40 Brett Anderson; 34 Jake Arrieta; 30 Trevor Cahill *; 47 R. A. Dickey *; 45 Brian Duensing *; 39 Jonathon Niese *; 15 Brandon Knight; 21 Mike Koplove; 49 Blaine Neal; 37 Jeff Stevens; 29 Stephen Strasburg *; 35 Casey Weathers	Catchers: 6 Lou Marson; 19 Taylor Teagarden *; Infielders: 18 Brian Barden *; 17 Matthew Brown *; 2 Jason Donald; 10 Mike Hessman; 3 Jayson Nix *; 26 Terry Tiffee; Outfielders: 24 Dexter Fowler *; 7 John Gall; 44 Matthew LaPorta; 14 Nate Schierholtz *	Manager: Davey Johnson *; Bob Watson (General Manager of USA Baseball Professional Teams); Coaches: Reggie Smith (Hitting); Marcel Lachemann (Pitching); Rick Eckstein (Bench/3rd Base); Dick Cooke (Auxiliary Coach); Roly de Armas (Auxiliary Coach)

2020 USA Baseball Olympic Team

2020 USA Baseball Olympic Team roster
Players		Coaches
Pitchers: 35 Shane Baz; 48 Anthony Carter; 32 Brandon Dickson; 31 Anthony Gose; 33 Edwin Jackson; 15 Scott Kazmir; 14 Nick Martinez; 39 Scott McGough; 30 David Robertson; 40 Joe Ryan; 28 Ryder Ryan; 44 Simeon Woods Richardson	Catchers: 34 Tim Federowicz; 8 Mark Kolozsvary; Infielders: 10 Nick Allen; 2 Eddy Alvarez; 26 Triston Casas; 25 Todd Frazier; 12 Jamie Westbrook; Outfielders: 23 Tyler Austin; 5 Eric Filia; 16 Patrick Kivlehan; 7 Jack López; 24 Bubba Starling	Manager: 49 Mike Scioscia; Coaches: 13 Roly de Armas (Bullpen); 3 Darren Fenster (Third base); 17 Dave Wallace (Pitching); 1 Jerry Weinstein (Bench); 19 Ernie Young (Hitting/First base)

The team's roster for the Olympics was released on July 2, 2021.

=== WBSC Premier12 ===
The WBSC created the Premier12 tournament in 2014, following the dissolution of the Baseball World Cup. The tournament is held in every four years in November. The American roster includes professional ballplayers who are not on an MLB 40-man roster. The roster includes some MLB prospects, though the tournament conflicts with the Arizona Fall League and winter leagues.

WBSC Premier12 record
Year	Result	Position	Pld	W	L	RS	RA	Squad	Ranking
(Japan) (Taiwan) 2015	Runners-up	2nd	8	6	2	43	34	Squad	2nd
(Japan) (South Korea) (Taiwan) (Mexico) 2019	Fourth Place	4th	9	4	5	34	39	Squad	2nd
(Japan) (Taiwan) (Mexico) 2024	Third Place	3rd	9	5	4	51	36	Squad	3rd
2027	To be determined								
Total	Runners-up	3/3	25	15	11	128	109	—	

=== Baseball World Cup (1938–2011) ===
In 1988, the Amateur World Series became the International Baseball Federation's (IBAF) World Cup.

Since 1938, the U.S. has won 15 medals at the Baseball World Cup: four gold (1973, 1974, 2007, 2009), eight silver (1938, 1940, 1969, 1970, 1972, 1978, 1988, 2001), and three bronze (1939, 1982, 1984).

The U.S. was usually represented by college players in these tournaments, while Cuba used its best players.

Amateur World Series & Baseball World Cup record
Year	Result	Position	Pld	W	L	%	RS	RA	Org.
(United Kingdom) 1938	Single-table tournament	2nd	5	1	4	.200	14	20	IBF
(Cuba) 1939	Single-table tournament	3rd	6	0	6	.000	9	30	IBF
(Cuba) 1940	Single-table tournament	2nd (Note: Tied with Nicaragua)	12	9	3	.750	51	20	IBF
(Cuba) 1941	Single-table tournament	6th	8	2	6	.250			IBF
(Cuba) 1942	Single-table tournament	Withdrew	8 (Note: The United States had a 1–7 record before forfeiting its last four games)	1	11	.083			IBF
(Cuba) 1943	Did not enter								IBF
(Venezuela) 1944	Did not enter								FIBA
(Venezuela) 1945	Did not enter								FIBA
(Colombia) 1947	Did not enter								FIBA
(Nicaragua) 1948	Did not enter								FIBA
(Nicaragua) 1950	Did not enter								FIBA
(Mexico) 1951	Did not enter								FIBA
(Cuba) 1952	Did not enter								FIBA
(Venezuela) 1953	Did not enter								FIBA
(Costa Rica) 1961	Did not enter								FIBA
(Colombia) 1965	Did not enter								FIBA
(Dominican Republic) 1969	Single-table tournament	2nd	10	9	1	.900			FIBA
(Colombia) 1970	Single-table tournament	2nd	13	10	3	.769			FIBA
(Cuba) 1971	Did not enter								FIBA
(Nicaragua) 1972	Single-table tournament	2nd	15	13	2	.867			FIBA
(Cuba) 1973	Did not enter								FIBA
(Nicaragua) 1973	Single-table tournament	1st	10	10	0	1.000			FEMBA
(United States) 1974	Single-table tournament	1st	10	9	1	.900			FEMBA
(Colombia) 1976	Did not enter								AINBA
(Italy) 1978	Single-table tournament	2nd	10	9	1	.900			AINBA
(Japan) 1980	Single-table tournament	4th	11	8	3	.727			AINBA
(South Korea) 1982	Single-table tournament	3rd	9	6	3	.667			IBAF
(Cuba) 1984	Single-table tournament	3rd	12	8	4	.667			IBAF
(Netherlands) 1986	Single-table tournament	4th	11	7	4	.636			IBAF
(Italy) 1988	Finals	2nd	13	11	2	.846			IBAF
(Canada) 1990	Second round	7th	9	5	4	.556			IBAF
(Nicaragua) 1994	Quarterfinals	8th	8	4	4	.500			IBAF
(Italy) 1998	Pool stage	8th	7	4	3	.571			IBAF
(Taiwan) 2001	Finals	2nd	10	7	3	.700			IBAF
(Cuba) 2003	Fifth place game	5th	9	7	2	.778			IBAF
(Netherlands) 2005	Seventh place game	7th	11	7	4	.636			IBAF
(Taiwan) 2007	Finals	1st	10	9	1	.900			IBAF
(Italy) 2009	Finals	1st	15	14	1	.933			IBAF
(Panama) 2011	Bronze medal game (canceled)	4th	11	7	4	.636			IBAF
Total	4 Titles	24/39	249	177	80	.689	—	—	

==== 2007 ====
The U.S. was in group A of the 2007 IBAF World Cup, along with Republic of China, Japan, Mexico, Panama, Italy, Spain and South Africa. The U.S. went 6–1 to win their group, with their only loss coming on November 9, 2007 against Italy. It was the U.S.'s first loss to Italy in 21 years and the first time it ever lost to Italy with professional players, as the team consisted of minor league prospects. It was, however, their only loss. The U.S. went on to beat Korea, Netherlands, and Cuba to capture the gold.

==== 2009 ====
In Round 1 of the 2009 Baseball World Cup, the U.S. (2–1) finished second in Group E, advancing alongside first-place Venezuela (3–0). In Round 2, the U.S. was joined by the nine other first- and second-place teams from Round 1, four wild-card teams, and the two principal host teams (Italy and the Netherlands). The 16 teams were divided into Groups F and G, where the U.S. (7–0) defeated each of the other seven teams in Group G. In Round 3, the top four teams from Group F were renamed Group 1, while the top four teams from Group G were renamed Group 2. The U.S. finished first in Group 2 with a perfect 7–0 record, while Cuba finished first in Group 1 with a 5–2 record. In the Final Round, Group 1 and Group 2's fourth-place teams competed for overall seventh place, the third-place teams played for fifth place, and the second-place teams faced off for the bronze medal. In the gold-medal game, the U.S. defeated Cuba, 10–5.

Tournament awards were given to Justin Smoak (MVP) and Todd Redmond (best won/loss average (pitcher)). Smoak (first base) was also named to the tournament All-Star Team, along with Jon Weber (outfield) and Terry Tiffee (designated hitter).

=== Minor tournaments ===
==== Intercontinental Cup ====
The Intercontinental Cup was an IBAF tournament first held in 1973 in Italy, and held every other year until 1999. The U.S. sat out the last three tournaments, in 2002, 2006, and 2010.

Future big leaguers who competed with the U.S. collegiate team in the Intercontinental Cup include Joe Carter, Terry Francona, Mickey Morandini, John Olerud, and Robin Ventura.

- 1973 : 3rd
- 1975 : 1st
- 1977 : 2nd
- 1979 : 3rd
- 1981 : 1st
- 1983 : 2nd

- 1985 : 6th place
- 1987 : 2nd
- 1989 : 6th
- 1991 : Did not qualify
- 1993 : 2nd
- 1995 : Did not qualify

- 1997 : 4th
- 1999 : 4th
- 2002 : Did not qualify
- 2006 : Did not qualify
- 2010 : Did not qualify

==== Pan American Games ====
The U.S. and Cuba have been archrivals at the Pan American Games ever since the event began in 1951. The U.S. has finished second behind Cuba eight of the 12 times they have brought home the gold. Likewise, when the U.S. won the gold medal at the 1967 Pan American Games, Cuba finished second. The U.S. roster is usually composed of promising college players, while Cuba is able to send its best players.

In total, the U.S. has won one gold medal, eleven silver medals, and three bronze medals. The only games the U.S. failed to medal in were 1979 and 1995. For the 1995 games, the U.S. did not send their national team, but instead the St. John's University baseball team, who finished 0–4 against the international all-star teams.

- 1951 : 2nd
- 1955 : 2nd
- 1959 : 3rd
- 1963 : 2nd
- 1967 : 1st
- 1971 : 2nd

- 1975 : 2nd
- 1979 : 4th
- 1983 : 3rd
- 1987 : 2nd
- 1991 : 3rd
- 1995 : 10th place

- 1999 : 2nd
- 2003 : 2nd
- 2007 : 2nd
- 2011 : 2nd
- 2015 : 2nd

- 2019 : Did not enter
- 2023 : Did not enter

==== Other minor tournaments ====
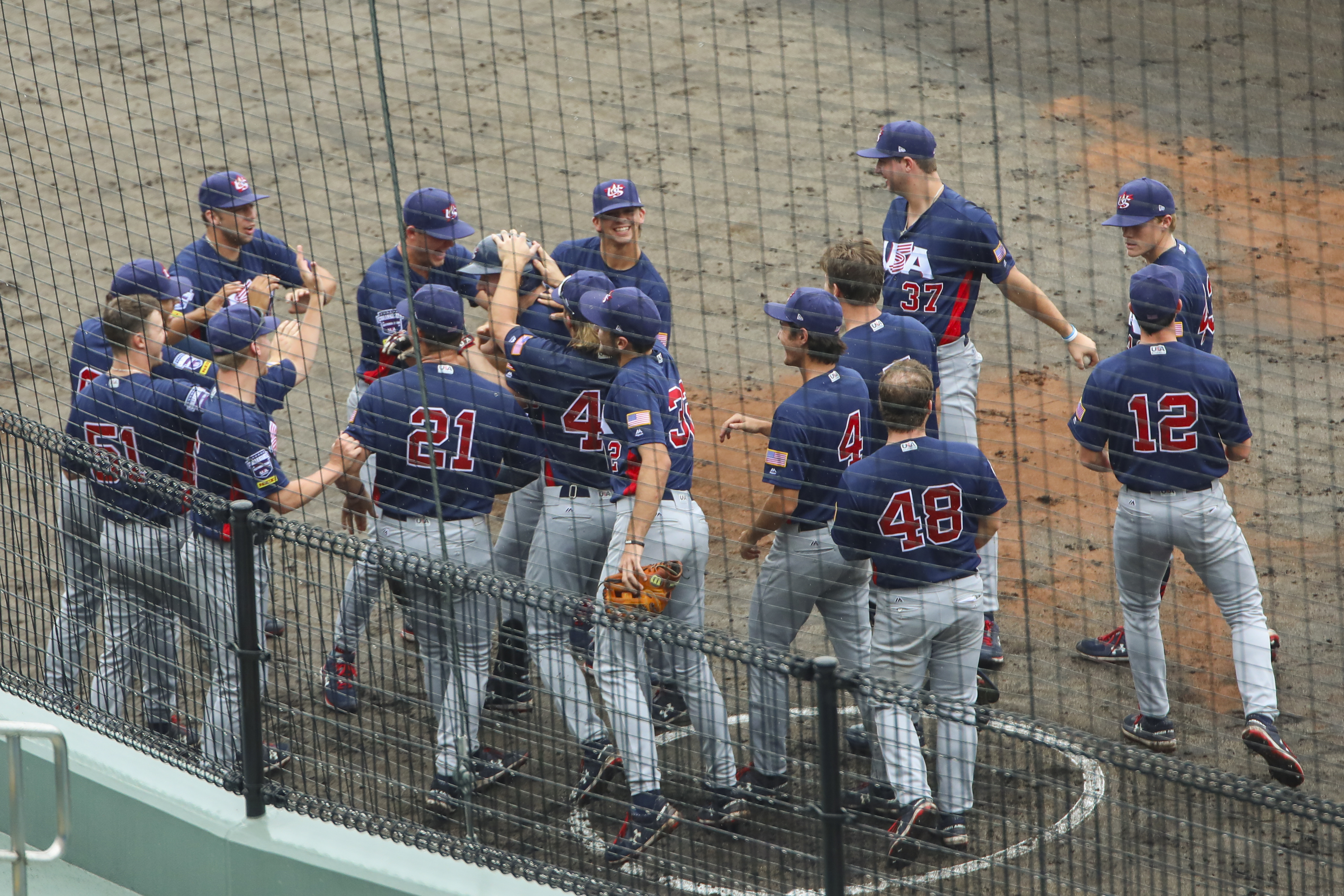
The U.S. collegiate national team celebrating during the 43rd Japan-USA Collegiate Baseball Championship Series in 2019

- Pan American Championship
  - Champions (2): 2006, 2021
  - Runners-up (2): 1998, 2002
  - Third place (2): 1985, 2010
- World Games
  - Champions: 1981
- Global World Series
  - Champions (2): 1955, 1956
- Inter-Allied Games
  - Champions: 1919
- International Amateur Tournament
  - Champions: 1968
- Haarlem Baseball Week
  - Champions (5): 1980, 2000, 2002, 2008, 2014
  - Runners-up: 2024
  - Third place (3): 2006, 2014, 2022
- World Port Tournament
  - Third place: 2009

== Managers ==
Manager	Years active	Competitions	Ref.
(United States) Leslie Mann	1935–1939	1938 Amateur World Series — Runners-up; 1939 Amateur World Series — 3rd place	
(United States) Larry Gardner	1940	1940 Amateur World Series — Runners-up	
(United States) George Lang	1941	1941 Amateur World Series — 6th place	
(United States) Joel Tierce	1942	1942 Amateur World Series — Withdrew	
(United States) Taylor Sanford	1951	1951 Pan American Games — Runners-up	
(United States) Leonard Weissinger	1956	1956 Summer Olympics — Champions	
(United States) J. Kyle Anderson	1959	1959 Pan American Games — 3rd place	
(United States) Archie Allen	1963	1963 Pan American Games — Runners-up	
(United States) Rod Dedeaux	1964–1984	1964 Summer Olympics — Champions; 1984 Summer Olympics — Runners-up	
(United States) Marty Karow	1967	1967 Pan American Games — Champions	
(United States) Danny Litwhiler	1968	1968 International Amateur Tournament — Champions	
(United States) Jack Kaiser	1969—1973	1969 Amateur World Series — Runners-up; 1973 Intercontinental Cup — 3rd place	
(United States) Jack Stallings	1970–1973	1970 Amateur World Series — Runners-up	
(United States) Bobby Winkles	1971	1971 Pan American Games — Runners-up	
(United States) Hal Smeltzly	1972	1972 Amateur World Series — Runners-up; 1975 Pan American Games — Runners-up	
(United States) Ron Fraser	1973–1992	1973 FEMBA Amateur World Series — Champions; 1987 Pan American Games — Runners-up; 1992 Summer Olympics — 4th place	
(United States) Glen Tuckett	1974	1974 FEMBA Amateur World Series — Champions	
(United States) Dick Bergquist	1975	1975 Intercontinental Cup — Champions	
(United States) Tom Chandler	1978	1978 Amateur World Series — Runners-up	
(United States) Jerry Kindall	1979	1979 Pan American Games — 4th place	
(United States) John Scolinos	1980	1980 Amateur World Series — 4th place	
(United States) Ron Maestri	1981	1981 World Games — Champions	
(United States) Bob Bennett	1983–1986	1983 Intercontinental Cup — Runners-up; 1983 Pan American Games — 3rd place 1986 Amateur World Series	
(United States) Duane Banks	1985	1985 Intercontinental Cup — 5th place	
(United States) Mark Marquess	1988	1988 Summer Olympics — Champions	
(United States) Jim Morris	1989–1990	1990 Goodwill Games — 3rd place 1990 Baseball World Cup — 7th place	
(United States) John Anderson	1993	1993 Intercontinental Cup — Runners-up	
(United States) Chuck Anderson	1994	1994 Baseball World Cup — 7th place	
(United States) Skip Bertman	1996	1996 Summer Olympics — 3rd place	
(United States) Bob Milano	1997	1997 Intercontinental Cup — 4th place	
(United States) Ron Polk	1998	1998 Baseball World Cup – 9th place	
(United States) Buddy Bell	1999	1999 Pan American Games — Runners-up	
(United States) Tommy Lasorda	2000	2000 Summer Olympics — Champions	
(United States) Terry Francona	2001	2001 Baseball World Cup – Runners-up	
(United States) Frank Robinson	2003	2004 Olympic Qualifying Tournament – Quarterfinals	
(United States) Marty Scott	2003	2003 Baseball World Cup – 5th place	
(United States) Buck Martinez	2006	2006 World Baseball Classic — 8th place	
(United States) Davey Johnson	2005–2009	2005 Baseball World Cup – 7th place 2007 Baseball World Cup — Champions; 2008 Summer Olympics – 3rd place 2009 World Baseball Classic — 4th place	
(Cuba) Eddie Rodríguez	2009	2009 Baseball World Cup – Champions	
(United States) Ernie Young	2010–2011	2010 Pan American Championship – 3rd place 2011 Pan American Games – Runners-up; 2011 Baseball World Cup – 4th place	
(United States) Joe Torre	2013	2013 World Baseball Classic — 6th place	
(United States) Jim Tracy	2015	2015 Pan American Games — Runners-up	
(United States) Willie Randolph	2015	2015 WBSC Premier12 — 4th place	
(United States) Jim Leyland	2017	2017 World Baseball Classic — Champions	
(United States) Scott Brosius	2019	2019 WBSC Premier12 — 4th place	
(United States) Mike Scioscia	2020–2024	2020 Summer Olympics — Runners-up; 2024 WBSC Premier12 — 3rd place	
(United States) Mark DeRosa	2023–present	2023 World Baseball Classic — Runners-up; 2026 World Baseball Classic — Runners-up	

== Uniforms & logos ==
The logo of USA Baseball

Logo used on team jersey

Logo used on team cap

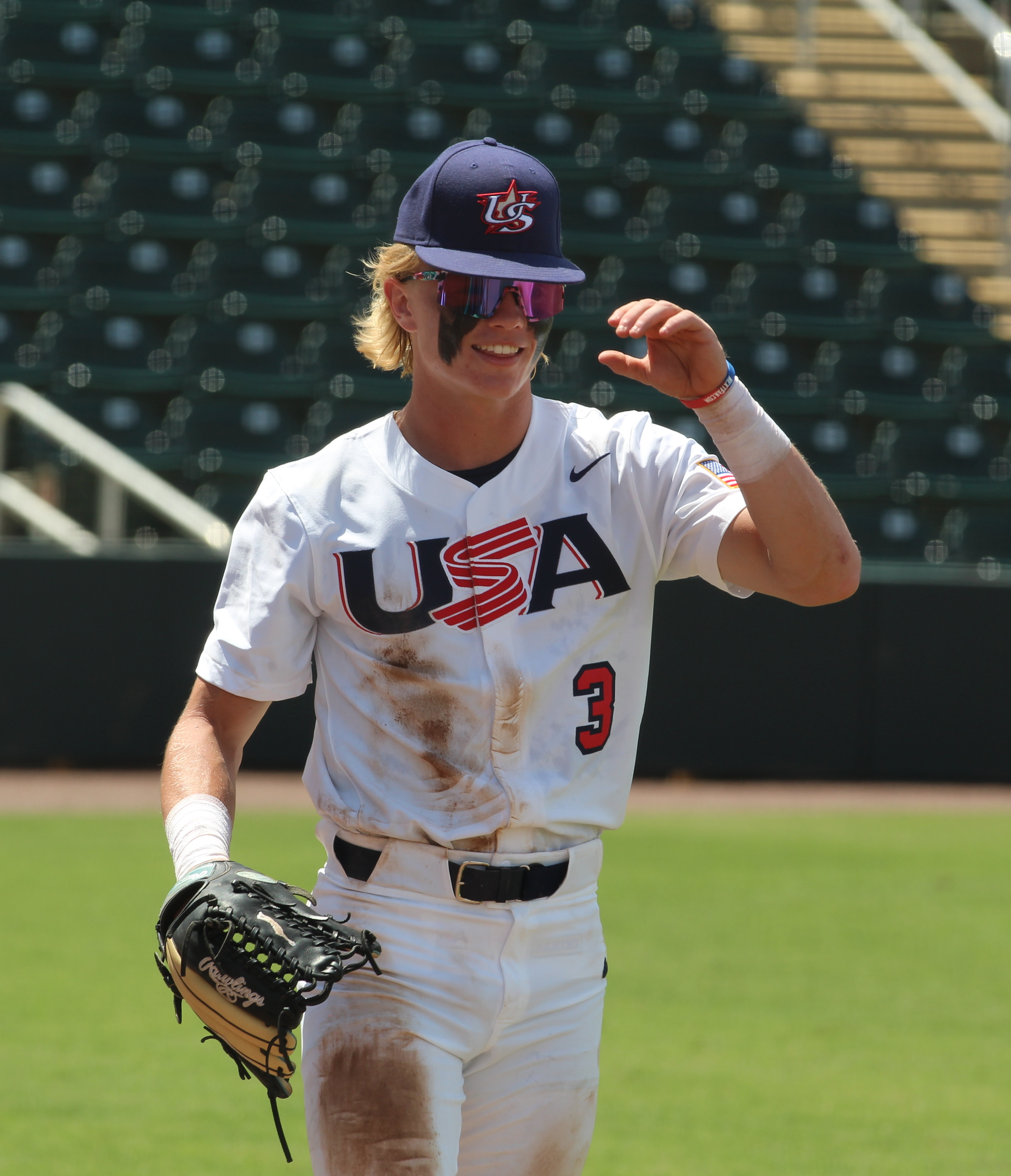
Current home uniform, worn by Max Clark

2006 WBC		2009 WBC		2013 WBC	
Home	Away	Home	Away	Home	Away

2017 WBC		2023 WBC			2026 WBC	
Home	Away	Home	Away	Alternate	Home	Away

== Collegiate National Team ==
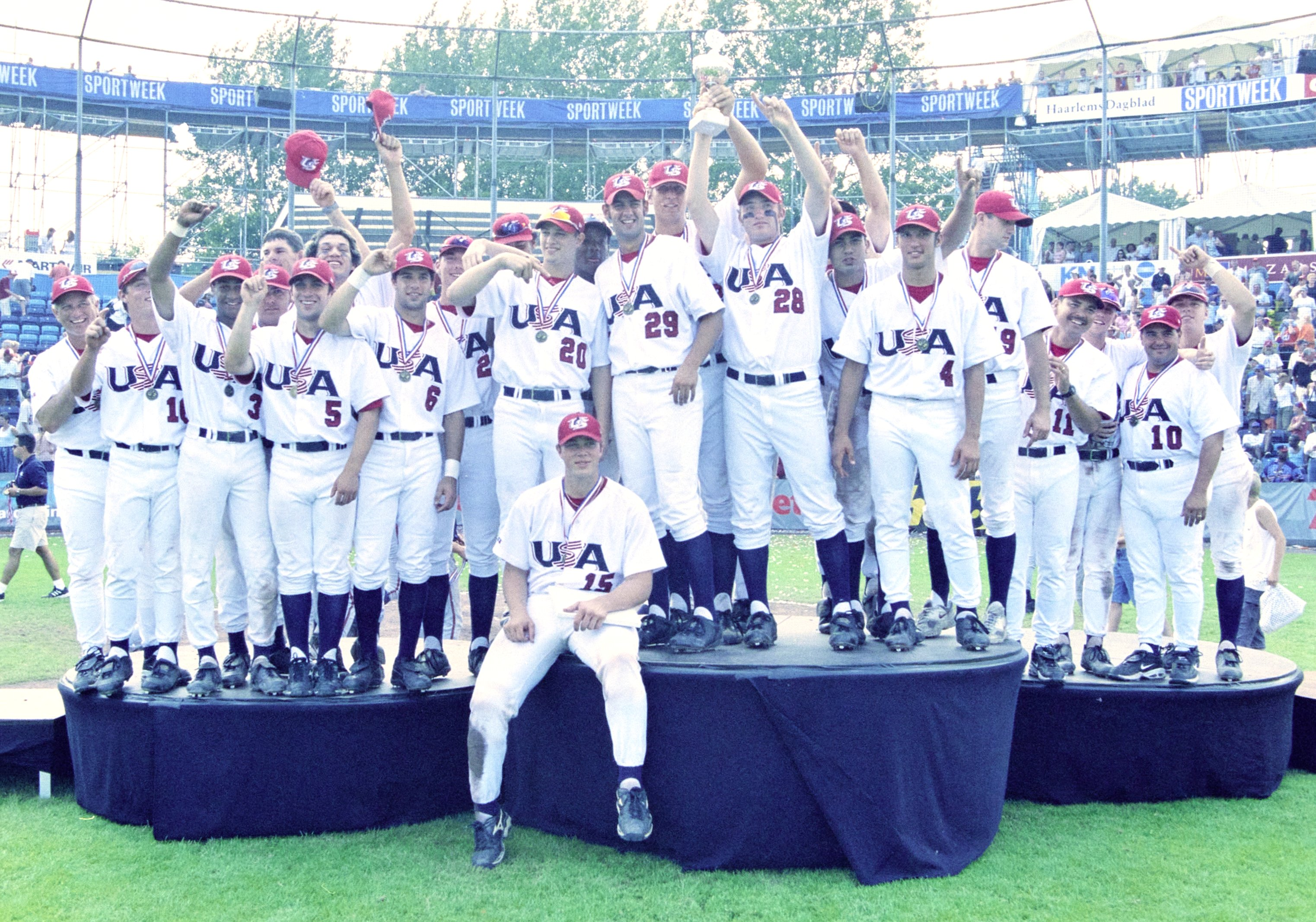
The collegiate national team celebrating its victory at the 2002 Haarlem Baseball Week

USA Baseball also fields a collegiate national team of top collegiate baseball players in the country. The team competes in exhibition games and international competitions against teams from across the world, including Canada, Japan, and the Netherlands. The collegiate team has won several international tournaments, including the 1988 Summer Olympics, 1973 and 1974 Baseball World Cup, 2009 World Baseball Challenge, and multiple Haarlem Baseball Weeks.

Players for the collegiate national team include Hall of Fame inductees Barry Larkin and Todd Helton, MLB Most Valuable Player award winners Dustin Pedroia, Ryan Howard, and Kris Bryant, and Cy Young Award winners David Price, Gerrit Cole, and Paul Skenes.

== Other national teams ==
USA Baseball also fields 18U, 15U, and 12U national baseball teams. Former national teams included 16U and 14U national teams. USA Baseball also hosts two national team development programs in the age divisions of 17U and 14U. The selection processes for these programs can be found on the official website of USA Baseball and these team programs also have their respective social media web pages.

== See also ==
- USA Baseball National Training Complex
- Major League Baseball
- Puerto Rico national baseball team
