= Alex Liddi =

Italian baseball player (born 1988)

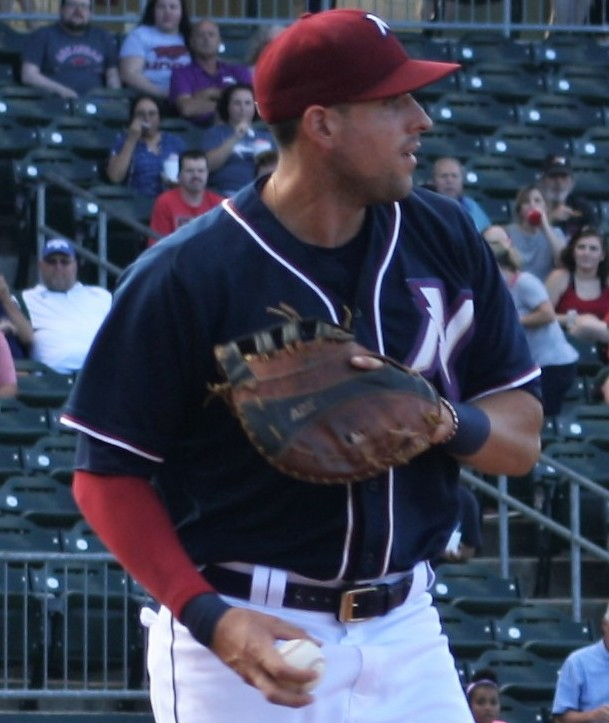
- Liddi with the Northwest Arkansas Naturals in 2018
- Third baseman / First baseman
- Born: August 14, 1988 (age 38); Sanremo, Italy
- Batted: Right Threw: Right

Professional debut
- MLB: September 7, 2011, for the Seattle Mariners
- CPBL: 2019, for the Chinatrust Brothers

Last appearance
- MLB: June 17, 2013, for the Seattle Mariners
- CPBL: 2019, for the Chinatrust Brothers

MLB statistics
- Batting average: .208
- Home runs: 6
- Runs batted in: 16

CPBL statistics
- Batting average: .244
- Home runs: 7
- Runs batted in: 20
- Stats at Baseball Reference

Teams
- Seattle Mariners (2011–2013); Chinatrust Brothers (2019)
Medals
Men's baseball
Representing Italy
European Baseball Championship
Bronze medal – third place	2016 Hoofddorp	National team

Alex Liddi (born August 14, 1988) is an Italian former professional baseball third and first baseman. He played in Major League Baseball (MLB) for the Seattle Mariners from 2011 through 2013, and in the Chinese Professional Baseball League (CPBL) for the Chinatrust Brothers in 2019. He is the first player born and raised in Italy to play in MLB and the CPBL.

== Professional career ==
=== Minor leagues ===
Liddi was signed as an undrafted free agent from Italy on September 9, 2005, by Seattle Mariners scouts Wayne Norton and Mauro Mazzotti. He began his professional career with the Peoria Mariners in 2006, getting hits in 34 of 47 games. He hit his first career home run on July 20 against the Arizona League Angels. He hit .352 in 23 games in July. He finished tied for fourth in the Arizona League with 57 hits and a .500 slugging percentage, fifth with 22 extra-base hits, and tied for ninth with a .313 batting average. Liddi led team with 13 doubles and recorded 15 multi-hit games. He had season-high eight game hitting streak, batting .469 from July 19–28. Liddi was promoted to the Single-A Wisconsin Timber Rattlers on August 24, appearing in 11 games.

In 2007, Liddi spent the entire season with Wisconsin. He led the Timber Rattlers with 28 doubles, 52 RBI, 400 at bats, 113 games played, and 154 total bases. He returned to Wisconsin in 2008, appearing in 125 games. He recorded a career-high five hits, going 5-for-5 with three runs scored and two doubles on June 14 against the Clinton LumberKings. That month, he hit .312 with 12 runs scored, five extra-base hits and nine RBI in 21 games. He hit .308 with 16 runs scored, 11 extra-base hits and 17 RBI in 29 games in August. Liddi participated in the Mariners developmental program after the season.

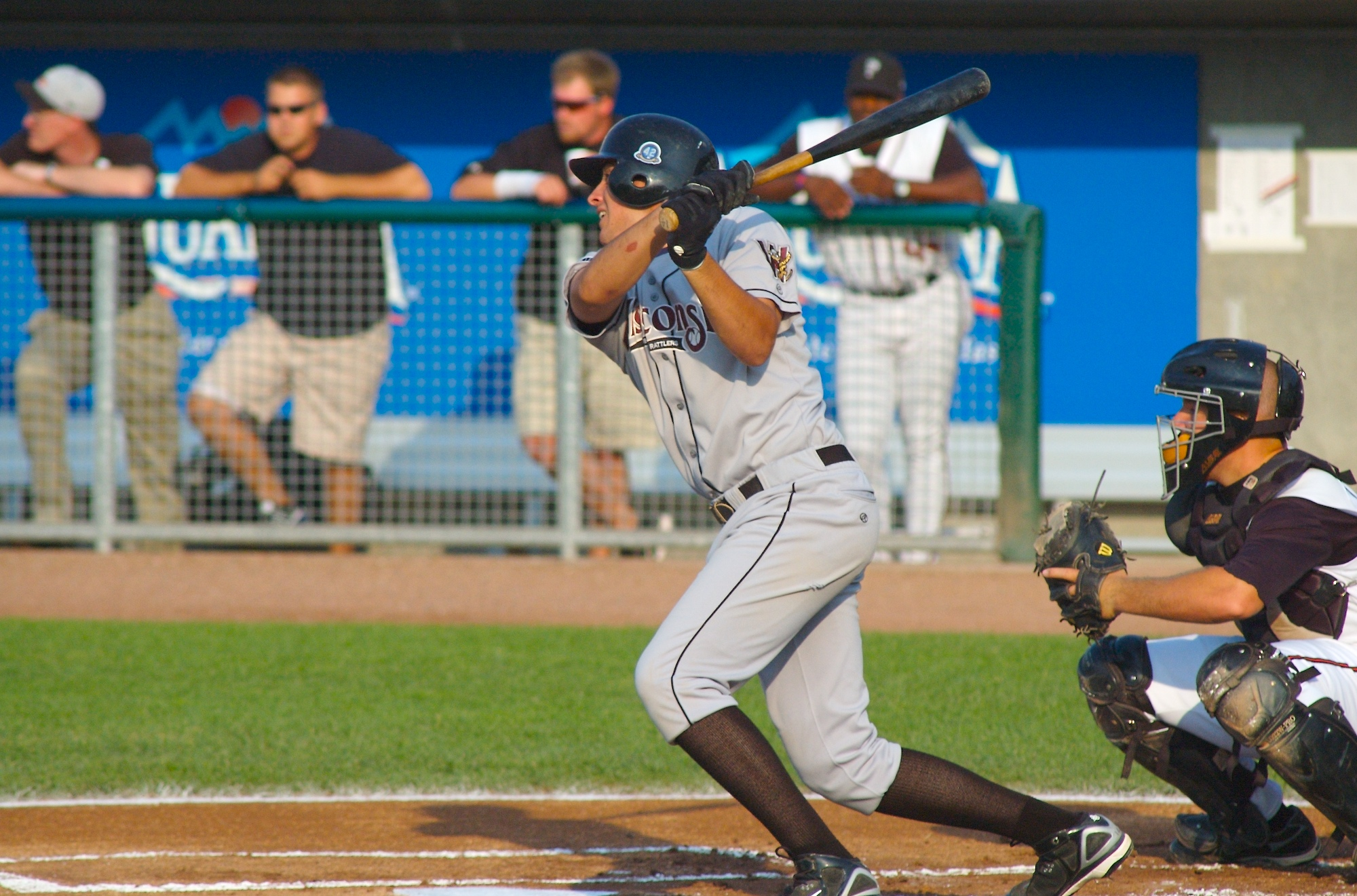
Liddi with Wisconsin in 2007

Liddi played for Italy in the 2009 World Baseball Classic prior to the start of the minor league season. He had a break-out season in 2009, batting a league-leading .345 with 23 home runs and 104 RBI in 129 games with the Single-A High Desert Mavericks. His batting average led all Mariners minor leaguers, while his 104 RBI tied with teammate Joe Dunigan for the organizational lead. Liddi shared the California League batting title with Koby Clemens. He was named the California League Most Valuable Player after ranking in the top 5 in the league in hits, doubles, on-base percentage, slugging percentage, extra-base hits, and runs scored. In June, he was one of four Mavericks on the California League All-Star Team, and in July, he participated in the All-Star Futures Game in St. Louis, Missouri. At season's end, Liddi was named the Topps California League Player of the Year. He was also named the Mariners' Minor League Player of the Year in September. Liddi was selected by MLB.com as the Mariners Organization Player of the Year.

In 2010, Liddi advanced to the Double-A West Tenn Diamond Jaxx. He was a Southern League All-Star and played in his second Futures Game. He led the league with 92 RBI and was second with 145 strikeouts. He was named the team's MVP.

==== Major leagues (2011–2013) ====
Liddi participated in his first Spring training with the Mariners in 2011. He hit grand slams in back-to-back games before being demoted to the Mariners' Triple-A affiliate, the Tacoma Rainiers, on March 12. In 8 Spring training games, Liddi hit for a .385 batting average and a .429 on-base percentage, with an OPS of .846. Liddi began the 2011 season in Tacoma. He hit .259 with 30 home runs, 104 RBI and a Pacific Coast League-leading 121 runs in Tacoma. Liddi was called up by the Mariners in September and made his MLB debut on September 7, becoming the first native Italian to play in MLB. He got his first career hit on September 9 against the Kansas City Royals. He hit his first career home run on September 19 against the Cleveland Indians. The following day, September 20, he homed against the Minnesota Twins.

Liddi made his only MLB Opening Day roster in 2012 after hitting .370 in spring training. He had a career-high 3 hits in a win over the Detroit Tigers on April 24. However, he was sent down to Triple-A in June, returning to the majors in September. He hit .224/.278/.353 with three home runs and 10 RBI in a career-high 38 games in the majors.

Liddi began 2013 as the Rainiers' Opening Day third baseman. After hitting .267 with 9 HR and 37 RBI in 50 games over the first two months, Liddi was recalled on May 29. After appearing in 8 games, he was optioned back to Tacoma. He was used as a backup at first base for Kendrys Morales and a pinch-hitter, going 1-for-17 with a double and a walk. He appeared in 9 more games with Tacoma before being designated for assignment on June 28.

=== Baltimore Orioles ===
On July 6, 2013, Seattle traded Liddi and their No. 3 international slot ($277,500) to the Baltimore Orioles in exchange for their No. 2 international slot ($351,200). He was optioned to the Triple-A Norfolk Tides, where in 49 games at first and third base, he hit .222 with 4 HR and 22 RBI. On September 6, after not earning a call-up when the rosters expanded, he was designated for assignment to make room for Chris Dickerson and was sent outright to Triple-A Norfolk two days later. After the season, Liddi became a minor league free agent.

=== Chicago White Sox ===
On November 14, 2013, Liddi signed a minor league deal with the Chicago White Sox. On May 12, 2014, Liddi was released by the White Sox after struggling to a .171/.203/.303 batting line in 22 Triple-A games.

=== Los Angeles Dodgers ===
On May 16, 2014, Liddi signed a minor league contract with the Los Angeles Dodgers organization. He played in 44 games for the Triple-A Albuquerque Isotopes and 36 for the Double-A Chattanooga Lookouts. He hit .219 for the Isotopes and .216 for the Lookouts.

=== Kansas City Royals ===
On January 10, 2015, Liddi signed a minor league deal with the Kansas City Royals. He spent the season with the Double-A Northwest Arkansas Naturals, batting .287/.324/.474 in 128 games before electing free agency on November 6.

=== Baltimore Orioles (second stint) ===
On January 12, 2016, Liddi signed with the Baltimore Orioles organization on a minor league contract. The news broke on the same day that pitcher Wei-Yin Chen signed with the Miami Marlins and Gerardo Parra signed with the Colorado Rockies, both leaving the Orioles. The Orioles released Liddi on April 1.

=== Tigres de Quintana Roo ===
On April 1, 2016, Liddi signed with the Tigres de Quintana Roo of the Mexican League. In December, a Mexican reporter tweeted that Liddi would play for a Japanese team; however, nothing was too apparent, including which team he would play for. He batted .281/.349/.538 with 23 home runs and 91 RBI in 2016 and was a Mexican League All-Star.

=== Toros de Tijuana ===
On March 28, 2017, Liddi was traded to the Toros de Tijuana from the Tigres de Quintana Roo. Liddi batted .225/.335/.399 with 17 home runs and 65 RBI and was a LMB All-Star for the second straight year.

=== Kansas City Royals (second stint) ===
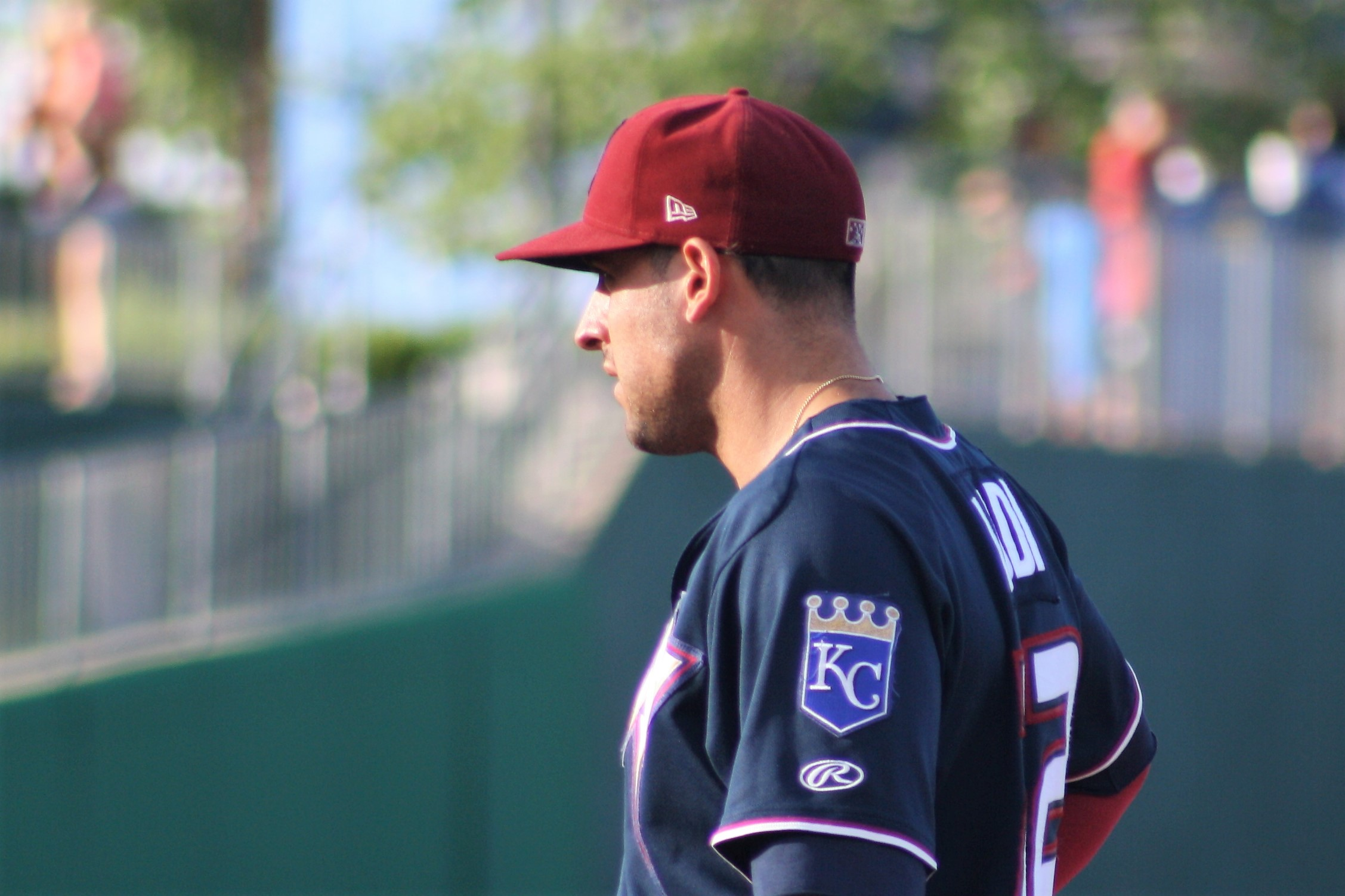
Liddi with the Naturals in 2018

On February 19, 2018, Liddi signed a minor league contract with the Kansas City Royals. He played in 107 games for the Double-A Northwest Arkansas Naturals, batting .247/.295/.484 with 23 home runs and 72 RBI. Liddi elected free agency following the season on November 2.

=== CTBC Brothers ===
On April 2, 2019, Liddi signed with the CTBC Brothers of the Chinese Professional Baseball League. In 33 games, he hit .244/.279/.487 with 7 home runs and 20 RBI. Liddi was released by the team on June 4.

=== Leones de Yucatán ===
On June 8, 2019, Liddi signed with the Leones de Yucatán of the Mexican League. Liddi batted a stellar .344/.414/.606 with 12 home runs and 66 RBI in just 59 games for Yucatán. Liddi did not play in a game in 2020 due to the cancellation of the Mexican League season because of the COVID-19 pandemic.

In 2021, Liddi slashed .315/.401/.580 with 16 home runs and 36 RBI in 63 games. Liddi was released by the club on January 11, 2022, after informing them he would be taking the season off.

=== El Águila de Veracruz ===
On February 24, 2023, Liddi signed with El Águila de Veracruz of the Mexican League. He played the entire 2023 season with the club, hitting .242/.304/.438 with 12 home runs and 35 RBI. Liddi returned to the team in 2024, and batted .211/.327/.361 with six home runs and 23 RBI over 50 games. He was released by Veracruz on June 14, 2024.

=== Leones de Yucatán (second stint) ===
On June 16, 2024, Liddi signed with the Leones de Yucatán of the Mexican League. In 11 games for Yucatán, he went 1-for-18 (.056) with two RBI. Liddi was released by the Leones on July 16.

=== Parma ===
Liddi played for two games for Parma Baseball Club of the Italian Baseball League in 2023. He returned to the team in 2024, batting .341 with 1 home run in 15 games. He was named the MVP of the Italian Baseball Series, helping Parma to its first domestic title since 2010.

On February 17, 2025, Liddi announced his retirement from professional baseball.

== International career ==
Liddi played for the Italy national team in 62 international games. He played for Italy in the 2009, 2013, and 2017 World Baseball Classic (WBC) tournaments. He batted .235/.364/.235 in the 2013 WBC, helping Italy defeat Mexico and Canada and advance to the second round.

Liddi said he enjoyed playing in the WBC:

This kind of tournament is so special because it's not about one player, it's not about one team, it's not about a city; it's about an entire country. So when you have a chance to represent your country at the highest level, it can't get any better than that, I think. So it feels like playing in the postseason

— Alex Liddi, ASAP Sports (March 7, 2013)

Liddi joined the junior national team as a 16-year-old. He hit .471 in four games at the 2007 European Baseball Championship. He hit .333 and tied for third in total bases in the 2016 European championship.

== Personal life ==
Liddi's father played baseball in high school.
