= 1973 Intercontinental Cup (baseball) =

The 1973 Intercontinental Cup was the inaugural edition of the long-running international baseball tournament. It was held in Italy.

Bruno Beneck, president of the Italian baseball federation (FIBS) was dissatisfied with the Latin American predominance of the worldwide governing body for the sport of baseball, the International Baseball Federation (FIBA). Beneck formed a splinter group called FEMBA, which organized the 1973 tournament.

The two groups merged back together in 1976 and continued to play the series.

== Final standings ==
Place	Team
Gold	Japan
Silver	Puerto Rico
Bronze	United States
4	Nicaragua
5	Canada
6	Italy
7	Taiwan
8	Argentina

Intercontinental Cup

Japan
First title
