= Mario Sanchez (baseball) =

Venezuelan baseball player (born 1994)

Mario Sánchez
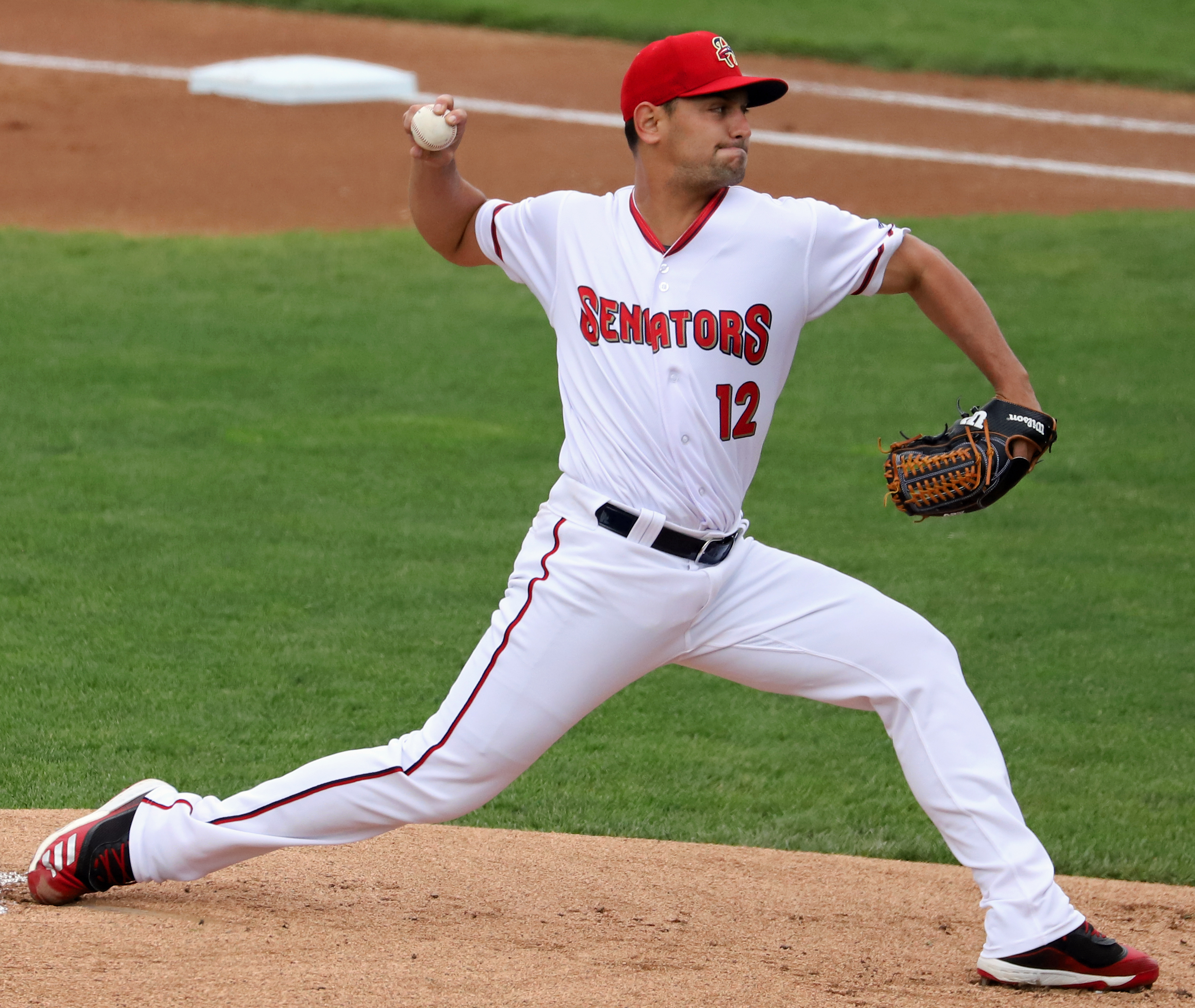
- Sanchez with the Harrisburg Senators in 2021

CTBC Brothers – No. 30
- Pitcher
- Born: October 31, 1994 (age 31); Maracaibo, Venezuela
- Bats: Right Throws: Right

Professional debut
- CPBL: April 30, 2023, for the Uni-President Lions
- KBO: July 9, 2023, for the Kia Tigers

CPBL statistics (through May 18, 2026)
- Win–loss record: 27–8
- Earned run average: 2.18
- Strikeouts: 275

KBO statistics (through 2023 season)
- Win–loss record: 4–4
- Earned run average: 5.94
- Strikeouts: 59
- Stats at Baseball Reference

Teams
- Uni-President Lions (2023); Kia Tigers (2023); Uni-President Lions (2024); CTBC Brothers (2025–present)

Mario Sánchez (born October 31, 1994) is a Venezuelan professional baseball pitcher for the CTBC Brothers of the Chinese Professional Baseball League (CPBL). He has previously played in the Chinese Professional Baseball League (CPBL) for the Uni-President Lions, and in the KBO League for the Kia Tigers.

== Career ==
=== Washington Nationals ===
On July 26, 2012, Sanchez signed with the Washington Nationals as a free agent, at the age of 17. He spent his first two professional seasons with the rookie–level Dominican Summer League Nationals, accumulating a 3.00 ERA with 64 strikeouts in 26 total games.

In 2014, Sanchez pitched in 18 games for the Low–A Auburn Doubledays, recording a 4.11 ERA with 25 strikeouts and 3 saves across 35 innings of work. He spent the 2015 season with the Single–A Hagerstown Suns, pitching to a 7–5 record and 4.86 ERA with 70 strikeouts and 2 saves in 90 2/3 innings pitched. In 2016, Sanchez made 32 appearances for the High–A Potomac Nationals, registering a 5–0 record and 3.46 ERA with 62 strikeouts in 78 innings of work.

=== Philadelphia Phillies ===
On December 12, 2016, the Nationals traded Sanchez to the Philadelphia Phillies as the player to be named later in their earlier trade for Jimmy Cordero on November 22. In 2017, he made 19 appearances for the Double–A Reading Fightin Phils, working to a 2.88 ERA with 32 strikeouts across 56 1/3 innings pitched. On July 1, 2017, Sanchez underwent Tommy John surgery, causing him to miss the remainder of the season. He made only seven appearances for the rookie–level Gulf Coast League Phillies the following season as he rehabilitated from surgery. Sanchez elected free agency following the season on November 2, 2018.

=== Washington Nationals (second stint) ===
On April 2, 2019, Sanchez signed a minor league contract to return to the Washington Nationals organization. He split the season between the Double–A Harrisburg Senators and Triple–A Fresno Grizzlies. In 27 combined games (22 starts), he accumulated a 10–7 record and 3.82 ERA with 118 strikeouts across 127 1/3 innings pitched.

Sanchez did not play in a game in 2020 due to the cancellation of the minor league season because of the COVID-19 pandemic. He spent majority of the 2021 season with Double–A Harrisburg, also appearing in two games for the Triple–A Rochester Red Wings. In 22 games (18 starts) for Harrisburg, he posted a 4–8 record and 3.98 ERA with 107 strikeouts across 106 1/3 innings of work. Sanchez elected free agency following the season on November 7, 2021.

=== Minnesota Twins ===
On January 4, 2022, Sanchez signed a minor league contract with the Minnesota Twins. In 28 games for the Triple–A St. Paul Saints, he registered a 6–4 record and 4.24 ERA with 70 strikeouts across 91 1/3 innings pitched. Sanchez elected free agency following the season on November 10.

=== Uni-President Lions ===
On January 31, 2023, Sanchez signed with the Uni-President 7-Eleven Lions of the Chinese Professional Baseball League. He helped the Lions win the half-season championship as he led the CPBL with a 1.44 earned run average and was named the league's most valuable player for June. In 10 games (9 starts), he pitched to an 8–1 record and 1.44 ERA with 42 strikeouts in 62 2/3 innings.

=== Kia Tigers ===
On July 4, 2023, Sanchez's contract was purchased for $280,000 by the Kia Tigers of the KBO League. In 12 games (11 starts) for Kia, he recorded a 5.94 ERA with 59 strikeouts across 63 2/3 innings pitched. Sanchez became a free agent following the 2023 season.

=== Uni-President Lions (second stint) ===
On December 27, 2023, Sanchez signed a contract to return to the Uni-President Lions of the Chinese Professional Baseball League. He made 26 starts for the Lions in 2024, compiling a 14-5 record and 2.49 ERA with 167 strikeouts across 159 1/3 innings pitched. Sanchez led the league in strikeouts and wins. He became a free agent following the season.

=== CTBC Brothers ===
On March 3, 2025, Sanchez signed a two-year, $1 million contract with the CTBC Brothers of the Chinese Professional Baseball League. He suffered a right shoulder injury on April 30, which later necessitated a platelet-rich plasma injection. Sanchez was released by the Brothers on June 20, having posted a 1-1 record and 1.54 ERA with 26 strikeouts over his four starts.

In 2026, Sanchez finished second in the league with 125 strikeouts and lost the opening game of the Taiwan Series to John Gant. Sanchez received criticism and threats on social media for the loss, including in replies to a pregnancy announcement he and his wife had previously posted. Sanchez faced Cristopher Crisostomo in the series-clinching Game 6.
