= Baseball at the World Games =

Baseball was introduced and only played at the 1981 World Games.

== Medalists ==
=== Men ===
Games	Gold	Silver	Bronze
1981 Santa Clara	United States (USA)	South Korea (KOR)	Australia (AUS)
