= 2013 World Baseball Classic Pool 2 =

World Baseball

Coordinates: 25°46′40.8″N 80°13′11.2″W

Pool 2 of the Second Round of the 2013 World Baseball Classic was held at Marlins Park, Miami, Florida, United States from March 12 to 16, 2013.

Pool 2 was a modified double-elimination tournament. The losers of the first two preliminary games (Games 1 and 2) matched up in a third preliminary game (Game 3), which was also an elimination game, while the winners of Games 1 and 2 faced each other in the first of two qualifier games (Game 4). The winner of the elimination game then played the loser of the non-elimination game in the second qualifier game (Game 5), which was another elimination game. The remaining two teams then played each other (in Game 6), to determine seeding for the semifinals of the championship round.

== Bracket ==
Preliminaries
DR	Italy	4
CW	Dominican Rep.	5
CR	Puerto Rico	1
DW	United States	7
Lower round 1
L1	Italy	3
L2	Puerto Rico	4

Qualifiers
W1	Dominican Rep.	3
W2	United States	1
Lower final
W3	Puerto Rico	4
L4	United States	3

Seeding
W4	Dominican Rep.	2
W5	Puerto Rico	0

Pool 2 MVP: (Dominican Republic) Robinson Canó

== Results ==
- All times are Eastern Daylight Time (UTC−04:00).

=== Dominican Republic 5, Italy 4 ===
March 12 13:00 at Marlins Park
Team	1	2	3	4	5	6	7	8	9	R	H	E
Italy	4	0	0	0	0	0	0	0	0	4	4	0
Dominican Republic	0	0	1	0	0	1	3	0	X	5	10	0
WP: Pedro Strop (2−0) LP: Pat Venditte (0−1) Sv: Fernando Rodney (3); Home runs: ITA: Chris Colabello (1); DOM: José Reyes (1), Robinson Canó (1); Attendance: 14,482 (39.4%); Umpires: HP − Ángel Hernández, 1B − Katsumi Manabe, 2B − Mark Wegner, 3B − Paul Hyham; Boxscore

=== United States 7, Puerto Rico 1 ===
March 12 20:00 at Marlins Park
Team	1	2	3	4	5	6	7	8	9	R	H	E
Puerto Rico	0	0	0	0	0	0	0	1	0	1	7	2
United States	1	0	1	0	1	0	1	3	X	7	12	0
WP: Gio González (1−0) LP: Mario Santiago (0−1); Attendance: 32,872 (89.5%); Umpires: HP − Marvin Hudson, 1B − Mark Wegner, 2B − Edgar Estivision, 3B − Katsumi Manabe; Boxscore

=== Puerto Rico 4, Italy 3 ===
March 13 19:00 at Marlins Park
Team	1	2	3	4	5	6	7	8	9	R	H	E
Italy	0	0	0	0	3	0	0	0	0	3	9	3
Puerto Rico	0	0	0	0	0	1	0	3	X	4	8	1
WP: Hiram Burgos (1−0) LP: Brian Sweeney (0−1) Sv: Fernando Cabrera (2); Attendance: 27,296 (74.3%); Umpires: HP − Mark Wegner, 1B − Paul Hyham, 2B − Marvin Hudson, 3B − Edgar Estivision; Boxscore

Italy's early lead in the 5th inning has caused team Puerto Rico to bring themselves closer to elimination until they have managed to ultimately steal the lead from the Italians when the Puerto Rican scored three additional runs from the eighth inning, as the Italian teams struggle to get ahead, only to end up earning themselves two more errors, as Puerto Rico clinched their win over Italy.

=== Dominican Republic 3, United States 1 ===
March 14 19:00 at Marlins Park
Team	1	2	3	4	5	6	7	8	9	R	H	E
Dominican Republic	0	1	0	0	0	0	0	0	2	3	9	1
United States	1	0	0	0	0	0	0	0	0	1	6	1
WP: Pedro Strop (3−0) LP: Craig Kimbrel (0−1) Sv: Fernando Rodney (4); Home runs: DOM: Hanley Ramírez (1); USA: None; Attendance: 34,366 (93.5%); Umpires: HP − Ángel Hernández, 1B − Katsumi Manabe, 2B − Marvin Hudson, 3B − Edgar Estivision; Boxscore

Tournament RBI leader and American leader David Wright sat the game out with a sore back. The game was close all the way to the 9th inning. American closer Craig Kimbrel came in for the 9th inning of the 1−1 game, to try to keep the score tied. Immediately Kimbrel gave up a lead-off double to Nelson Cruz, despite not giving up one all year with the Atlanta Braves in 2012. Erick Aybar drove Cruz in and would later score himself, on a single by José Reyes, as the Dominican Republic would maintain their undefeated record.

MLB Network announcer Tom Verducci, on seeing the jubilant reaction of the Dominican players after they took the lead in the game, said "this is beyond October."

=== Puerto Rico 4, United States 3 ===
March 15 19:00 at Marlins Park
Team	1	2	3	4	5	6	7	8	9	R	H	E
Puerto Rico	1	0	0	0	0	3	0	0	0	4	9	1
United States	0	0	0	0	0	0	1	2	0	3	8	0
WP: Nelson Figueroa (2−0) LP: Ryan Vogelsong (1−1) Sv: J. C. Romero (1); Attendance: 19,762 (53.8%); Umpires: HP − Mark Wegner, 1B − Ángel Hernández, 2B − Edgar Estivision, 3B − Paul Hyham; Boxscore

The US team (with David Wright unable to play) and the Puerto Rico team played a second time. Puerto Rico took an early lead in the first inning and stretched the lead further in the sixth inning 4-0. The US struggled to catch up, but J.C. Romero barely managed to stave off from the bases-loaded jam in the eighth inning. The Puerto Rico team defeated the US team, 4-3, so that Puerto Rico qualified as the pool's second team in the championship round, and earning their payback from a 6-5 loss in the 2009 World Baseball Classic.

=== Dominican Republic 2, Puerto Rico 0 ===
March 16 13:00 at Marlins Park
Team	1	2	3	4	5	6	7	8	9	R	H	E
Puerto Rico	0	0	0	0	0	0	0	0	0	0	3	0
Dominican Republic	0	0	0	0	1	0	0	1	X	2	6	1
WP: Wandy Rodríguez (1−0) LP: Orlando Román (0−1) Sv: Fernando Rodney (5); Home runs: PUR: None; DOM: Carlos Santana (1); Attendance: 25,846 (70.3%); Umpires: HP − Marvin Hudson, 1B − Ángel Hernández, 2B − Paul Hyham, 3B − Katsumi Manabe; Boxscore
