= Luis Casanova (baseball) =

Cuban baseball player

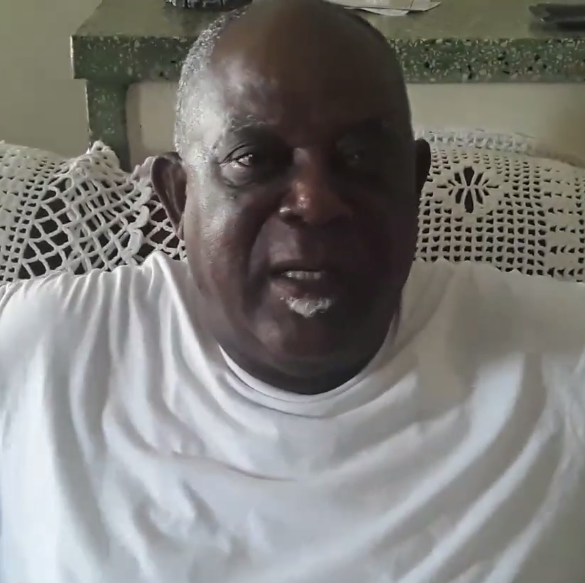
- Casanova c. 2022
- Right fielder
- Born: December 5, 1956 (age 69); Bahía Honda, Artemisa, Cuba
- Bats: Right Throws: Right

Member of the Cuban

Baseball Hall of Fame
- Induction: 2014
Medals
Men's baseball
Representing Cuba
Baseball World Cup
Gold medal – first place	1978 Italy	Team
Gold medal – first place	1980 Tokyo	Team
Gold medal – first place	1984 Havana	Team
Gold medal – first place	1986 Amsterdam	Team
Gold medal – first place	1988 Rome	Team
Gold medal – first place	1990 Edmonton	Team
Intercontinental Cup
Gold medal – first place	1979 Havana	Team
Silver medal – second place	1981 Edmonton	Team
Gold medal – first place	1983 Brussels	Team
Gold medal – first place	1985 Edmonton	Team
Gold medal – first place	1987 Havana	Team
Gold medal – first place	1991 Spain	Team
Pan American Games
Gold medal – first place	1979 San Juan	Team
Gold medal – first place	1987 Indianapolis	Team
Central American and Caribbean Games
Silver medal – second place	1978 Medellín	Team
Gold medal – first place	1986 Santiago de los Caballeros	Team
Goodwill Games
Gold medal – first place	1990 Seattle	Team
Coach for Nicaragua
Bronze medal – third place	1998 Italy	Team

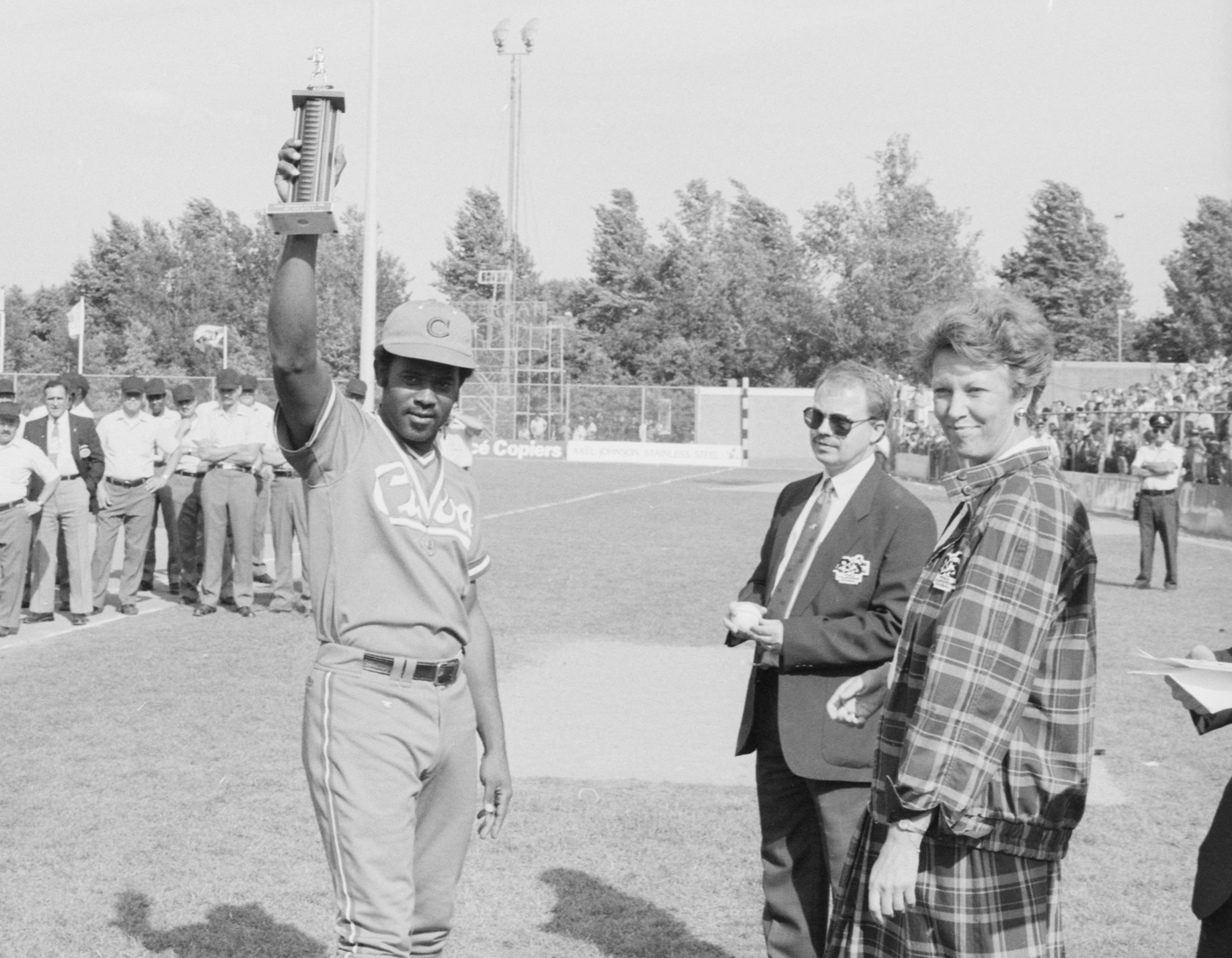
Casanova at the 1986 Amateur World Series

Luis Giraldo Casanova Castillo (born December 5, 1956) is a Cuban former professional baseball player in the Cuban National Series who had a successful career in international tournaments. Casanova's teams won many titles in Cuban league play, and he led the league in all three Triple Crown statistics (batting average, home runs, and runs batted in) at least once. He led major international tournaments in home runs seven times.

== Personal life ==
Casanova was born in Bahía Honda, Cuba. He was nicknamed El Señor Pelotero. He is the brother of Leovigildo Casanova and uncle of Reinier Casanova.

== 1970s ==
Casanova made his debut on the international stage in the 1978 Central American and Caribbean Games. The 21-year-old outfielder helped the Cuban national team win a gold medal, going 20 for 33 and tying for the most doubles (5).

In the 1978 Amateur World Series, Casanova hit .444 with 12 runs and eight RBI in ten games. He was second in the tournament in batting average behind Roberto Espino. His 3 homers tied for 4th, behind Antonio Muñoz, Tim Wallach and Ernesto Lopez. Cuba won Gold.

In the 1979 Pan American Games, Casanova had 13 hits in 35 at-bats to hit .371 and help Cuba win Gold. He tied Terry Francona for the most triples (3) and tied Francona and Agustín Marquetti for the most hits. In the 1979 Intercontinental Cup, Casanova hit .375 as Cuba cruised to victory.

Casanova had his first great season in domestic play in Cuba in the 1979-1980 Serie Nacional, leading in runs (64) and walks (57). He tied for the most sacrifice flies (5) and his 18 home runs tied Pedro José Rodríguez, Sr. for the most.

== 1980s ==
Casanova tied Antonio Muñoz for the 1980 Amateur World Series lead in home runs with seven as Cuba won Gold. In the 1981 Serie Nacional season, Casanova led the league with 9 times hit by pitch. In the Selective Series of 1981, he hit .363, leading the league in batting average. He also tied for the league lead in triples, with four. During the 1981 Intercontinental Cup, Casanova's Cuban team failed to win Gold for the first and only time of his career. He was 19 for 37 at the plate and led in average (.514), home runs (6), runs (12), hits (15) and RBI (19). Casanova won MVP honors though the USA took home the gold medal.

In the 1982 Selective Series, he led the league in runs scored with 49. He also tied for the league lead in triples, with four. It was the only year from 1978 to 1986 that Casanova did not play on the international stage, as Cuba sat out the 1982 Amateur World Series. During the 1982-1983 Serie Nacional, Casanova tied Alejo O'Reilly for the most walks, with 34.

Casanova batted .389 in a backup role in the 1983 Intercontinental Cup, as Cuba won Gold. In the 1983-1984 Serie Nacional, the 27-year-old veteran tied Lázaro Junco for the league lead in home runs, with 20. He tied for the most doubles (19) and led with 67 RBI. That won him the MVP award, the only time he took home that honor for a Serie Nacional. In the 1984 Selective Series, he hit .391, leading the league.

In the 1984 Amateur World Series, Casanova hit .364 with 6 home runs, 12 runs and 15 RBI in 13 games. He tied Pedro José Rodríguez and Roberto Bianchi for the home run lead, tied Bianchi for third in hits (20) and tied Muñoz for third in RBI. Casanova helped Cuba to Gold; among those he outslugged was American Barry Bonds. He was to appear in the 1984 Olympics, but did not because Cuba boycotted them. Casanova batted .429 in the 1985 Intercontinental Cup, which he led in home runs (6) and RBI (19).

During the 1986 Amateur World Series, Casanova hit .409 with a tournament-leading 19 RBI and six home runs to help Cuba win Gold. He tied Italy's Giuseppe Carelli for most RBI. In the 1986 Central American and Caribbean Games, the outfield superstar hit .500 and led the tournament with 16 runs scored. Cuba claimed another Gold.

Casanova made the All-Star outfield in the 1987 Intercontinental Cup as Cuba won it all. In the 1987 Pan American Games, Casanova hit .433 with four home runs and 12 runs scored to help Cuba take Gold.

In the 1988 Baseball World Cup, he led the tournament in home runs with seven while hitting .392 with 15 runs and 21 RBI in 13 games. He tied Tino Martinez for second in the tournament in RBI, behind Robin Ventura's 32. He was 4th with 20 hits. Casanova had two assists and no errors in right field. He made the tournament All-Star team, joining Lourdes Gourriel and Daisuke Tsutsui in the outfield. Though Cuba won Gold, the US's Martinez beat out Casanova for MVP honors.

== 1990s ==
In the 1990 Baseball World Cup, Casanova hit .462 with eight RBI and three home runs in five games, splitting right field action with Ermidelio Urrutia. He hit all of his home runs in a single game, becoming only the second person to hit three home runs in a Baseball World Cup game (the other was Antonio Muñoz, who did it in 1980).

In the 1991 Intercontinental Cup, Casanova tied Prospero Baca and Wei-Cheng Chen for second in the tournament in RBI, with 12, as Cuba won yet another Gold. Furthermore, he hit .364 with nine walks, ten runs and four home runs in 11 games. He was second in home runs, one behind Jose Ramon Padilla.

Casanova was a coach for Nicaragua in the 1998 Baseball World Cup.

== Cuban Series career statistics ==
Overall, Casanova hit .322 in 17 seasons in Cuba. He belted 312 homers in 5,288 AB, scored 1,144 runs, drove in 1,069 runs and drew 1,049 walks.

== 21st century ==
In the 2008-2009 Cuban National League, Casanova managed Pinar del Rio to a second-place finish, three games behind La Habana. They finished with a 54–36 record. It was Luis's managerial debut, having previously been a coach in Cuba following his playing career.
