= Víctor Mesa =

Cuban baseball player (born 1960)

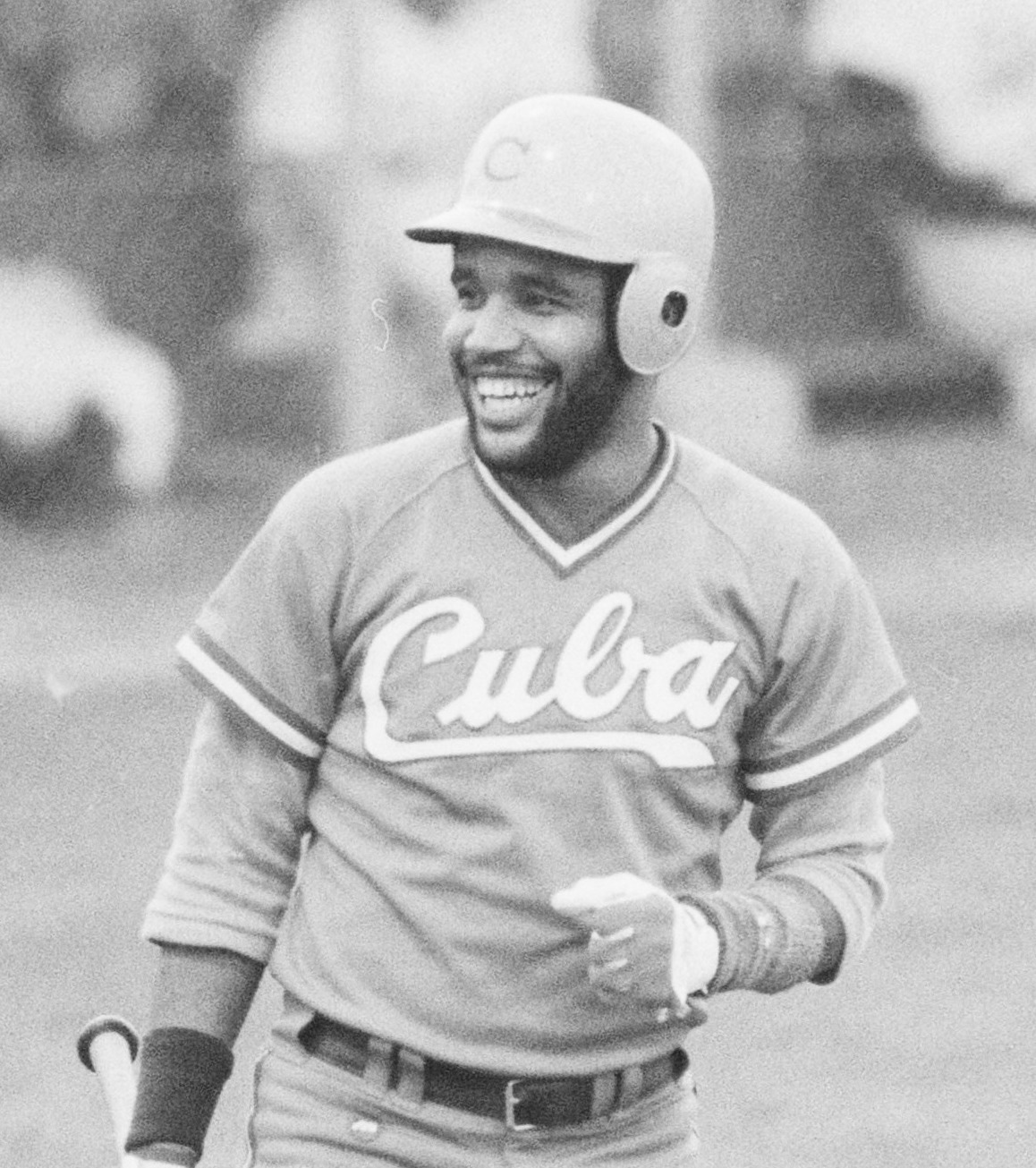
- Mesa at the 1986 Amateur World Series
- Outfielder / Manager
- Born: February 20, 1960 (age 66); Havana, Cuba
- Bats: Right Throws: Right

Career highlights and awards
- Amateur World Series MVP (1984)
Medals
Men's baseball
Representing Cuba
Olympic Games
Gold medal – first place	1992 Barcelona	Team
Baseball World Cup
Gold medal – first place	1984 Havana	Team
Gold medal – first place	1986 Amsterdam	Team
Gold medal – first place	1988 Rome	Team
Gold medal – first place	1990 Edmonton	Team
Gold medal – first place	1994 Managua	Team
Intercontinental Cup
Silver medal – second place	1981 Edmonton	Team
Gold medal – first place	1983 Brussels	Team
Gold medal – first place	1987 Havana	Team
Gold medal – first place	1989 San Juan	Team
Gold medal – first place	1993 Italy	Team
Gold medal – first place	1995 Havana	Team
Pan American Games
Gold medal – first place	1983 Caracas	Team
Gold medal – first place	1987 Indianapolis	Team
Gold medal – first place	1991 Havana	Team
Gold medal – first place	1995 Mar del Plata	Team
Central American and Caribbean Games
Silver medal – second place	1982 Havana	Team
Gold medal – first place	1986 Santiago de los Caballeros	Team
Gold medal – first place	1990 Mexico City	Team
Gold medal – first place	1993 Ponce	Team
Goodwill Games
Gold medal – first place	1990 Seattle	Team

Víctor Mesa Martínez (born February 20, 1960) is a Cuban baseball manager and former player. Nicknamed "El Loco," he played 19 seasons in the Cuban National Series from 1978 to 1996, all with Villa Clara, and was a longtime fixture of the Cuba national baseball team. He has since managed in the National Series and with the national team, including at the 2013 World Baseball Classic.

== Playing career ==
Mesa earned a reputation as an aggressive baserunner, leading the SNB in stolen bases on six occasions (1979, 1980, 1983, 1984, 1989, and 1992). He also participated in several Selective Series with Las Villas, earning eight more stolen base titles for a total of 14 over the course of his playing career. In the National Series, he posted a .318 batting average and slugged 273 home runs. His showmanship and aggressive style of play was polarizing on the field, but earned him many fans in Cuba even outside his home province of Villa Clara.

Mesa played with the Cuba national baseball team from 1981 to 1995. He was named most valuable player at the 1984 Amateur World Series, and is a one-time Olympic gold medalist for baseball, won at the 1992 Summer Olympics in Barcelona; he led all hitters at the 1992 Games in batting average (.560) and RBIs (9). Over the course of 20 appearances (Note: One Olympic Games appearance, five Baseball World Cups, four Pan American Games, four Central American Games, and six Intercontinental Cups)) at major international tournaments, he batted .365 with 30 home runs and 169 runs batted in.

== Managerial career ==
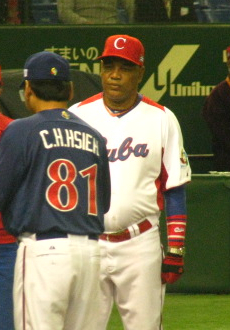
Mesa at the 2013 World Baseball Classic

After his playing career ended, Mesa managed Villa Clara from 2000 to 2008, leading it to deep playoff runs in 2001 and 2002.

Mesa also managed in Mexico, steering the Rojos del Águila de Veracruz club in the 2010 Mexican League season and the Petroleros de Minatitlán in the 2011 season. He also piloted the Cafeteros de Córdoba of the Veracruz Winter League. Mesa left Minatitlán after posting an 11–15 record.

In 2011, Mesa took the reins of Matanzas, leading the team to the finals twice, in 2013 and 2014; it lost both years, to Villa Clara and Pinar del Río, respectively. After six seasons with Matanzas, he left to manage Industriales in the 2017–18 Cuban National Series; Mesa led the team to a fourth-place finish, but resigned after he alleged he was overlooked by the Baseball Federation of Cuba for a coaching position with the national team.

== Personal life ==
His sons, Víctor Víctor Mesa and Víctor Mesa Jr., defected from Cuba in 2018. Both became professional baseball players in the Miami Marlins organization.
