= Antonio Muñoz (baseball) =

Cuban baseball player

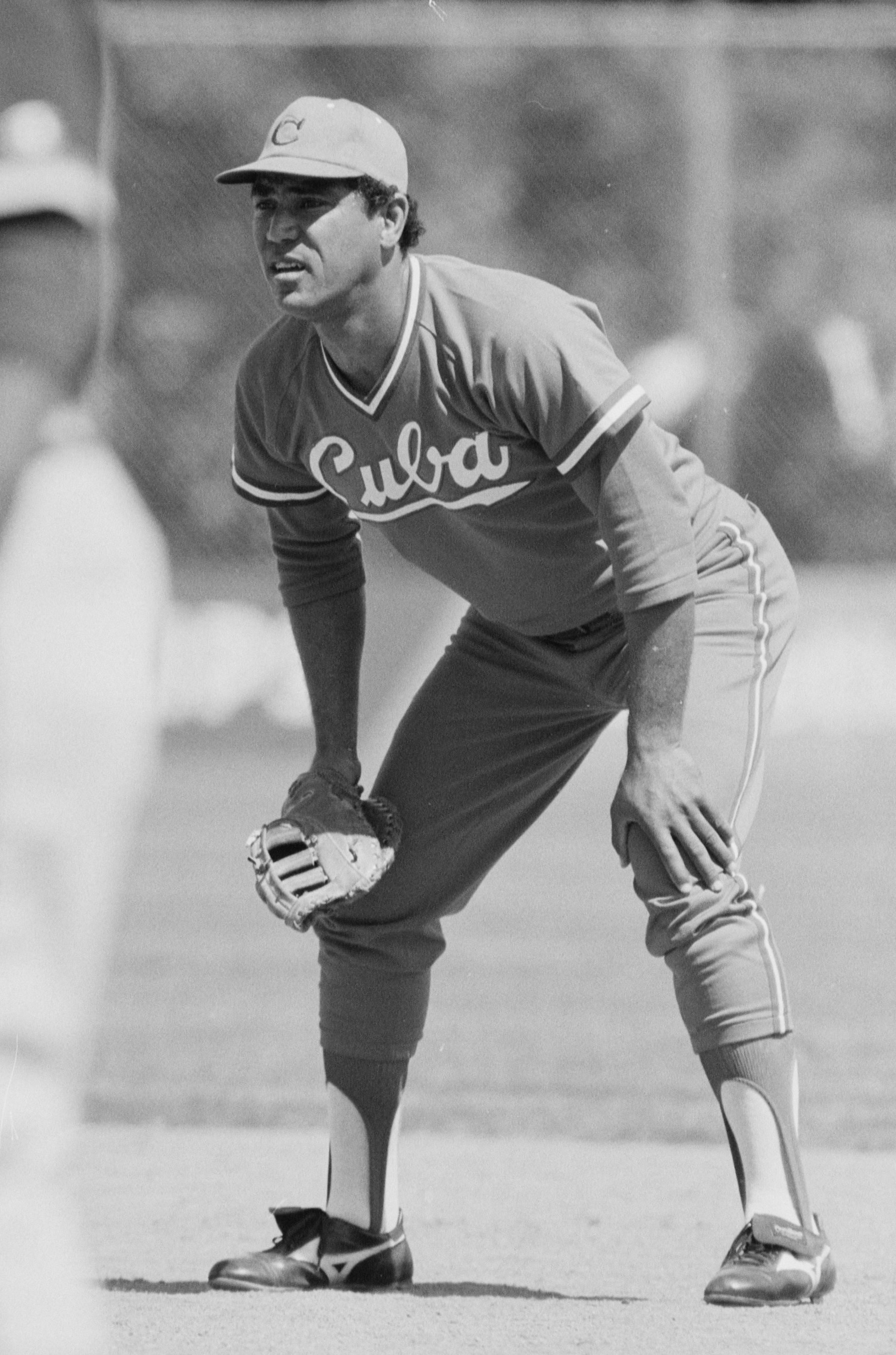
- Muñoz at the 1986 Amateur World Series
- First baseman
- Born: January 17, 1949 (age 77); Trinidad, Las Villas, Cuba
- Bats: Left Throws: Left

SNB statistics
- Batting average: .302
- Hits: 2,014
- Home runs: 355

Career highlights and awards
- 2x Amateur World Series MVP (1978, 1980)

Member of the Cuban

Baseball Hall of Fame
- Induction: 2014
Medals
Men's baseball
Representing Cuba
Amateur World Series
Gold medal – first place	1976 Colombia	Team
Gold medal – first place	1978 Italy	Team
Gold medal – first place	1978 Japan	Team
Gold medal – first place	1978 Havana	Team
Gold medal – first place	1978 Netherlands	Team
Intercontinental Cup
Gold medal – first place	1983 Antwerp	Team
Gold medal – first place	1985 Edmonton	Team
Pan American Games
Gold medal – first place	1975 Mexico City	Team
Gold medal – first place	1979 San Juan	Team
Gold medal – first place	1983 Caracas	Team
Central American and Caribbean Games
Gold medal – first place	1978 Medellin	Team
Gold medal – first place	1986 Santiago de los Caballeros	Team
Silver medal – second place	1982 Havana	Team

Antonio Nicolás Muñoz Hernández (born January 17, 1949) is a Cuban former baseball player who spent his 24-year career as a first baseman in the Cuban National Series (SNB). Known as "El Gigante del Escambray" (The Giant of Escambray), he played with Azucareros, Sancti Spíritus, and Cienfuegos in the National Series.

Muñoz won eight home run titles, and was the first player in the history of the National Series to reach 300 home runs. At the time of his retirement, he was the league's all-time leader in nine offensive statistics, including runs scored, doubles, home runs, total bases, walks and intentional walks. His career home run record stood until it was surpassed by Lazaro Junco in the 1980s. With the Cuba national baseball team, he earned two consecutive Most Valuable Player awards at the Amateur World Series in 1978 and 1980.

Muñoz was selected to the Cuban Baseball Hall of Fame in 2014, and was awarded the Hero of the Republic of Cuba by Miguel Díaz-Canel in 2024. Historian Peter C. Bjarkman described Muñoz, along with national team star Agustín Marquetti, as Cuba's version of the M&M Boys (Roger Maris and Mickey Mantle). Sports Illustrated writer Ron Fimrite described him as a "left-handed Tony Pérez." After Major League Baseball manager Preston Gómez visited Cuba in 1977, he reportedly said that the only thing he wanted to take back with him was "that big hillbilly in my suitcase," referring to Muñoz.

== Career ==
Muñoz was discovered by Cuban coach Pedro Jiménez. He debuted in the Cuban National Series in 1969 with the Azucareros team of Las Villas Province. He hit his first career home run at the Estadio Augusto César Sandino in Santa Clara on February 16, 1969. His breakthrough campaign came the following year, during the summertime Serie de los 10 Millones, leading the league in triples. In the 1973–74 season, he finished first in home runs (19), RBIs (68), runs scored (54), walks (66) and intentional walks (15), earning Most Valuable Player honors.

After Las Villas Province was divided into three separate administrative divisions, the province's Azucareros team was disbanded for the 1977–78 season, and Muñoz joined the newly established Sancti Spíritus team. He won a championship with Sancti Spíritus the following year, in 1979. He later established residency in Cienfuegos Province, to great controversy, playing for the Cienfuegos from 1980 to his retirement in 1991. He concluded his National Series career with a .302 average, 1,551 walks, 1,407 RBIs, 370 home runs, and a .535 slugging percentage.

Muñoz first appeared with the national team at the 1976 Amateur World Series held in Barranquilla, Colombia, posting a batting average of .308. At the 1978 Amateur World Series in Italy, he went 13-for-32 for a .406 average, leading the tournament in runs scored (14), home runs (8) and RBIs (18); that performance earned him Most Valuable Player honors. At the 1980 Amateur World Series in Japan, leading the field in home runs with 7 (tied with Luis Casanova) and RBIs (19), averaging .400 (18-for-45). In the final against Japan, he hit the game-winning home run off of Yukio Takemoto that earned him a second consecutive AWS MVP award. He went on to appear at the AWS in 1984 in Havana (hitting .424 with 5 home runs) and 1986 (hitting .385).
