= 1981 Intercontinental Cup (baseball) =

Tournament details
- Country: Canada
- Dates: August 6 – 16, 1981
- Teams: 8
- Defending champions: Cuba

Final positions
- Champions: United States (2nd title)
- Runners-up: Cuba
- Third place: Dominican Republic

Tournament statistics
- Best BA: (Cuba) Luis Casanova (.517)
- Most HRs: (Cuba) Luis Casanova (6)
- Most SBs: (Japan) Mitsugu Kobayashi (8)
- Best ERA: (Canada) Perry Lychak (0.66)

Awards
- MVP: (Cuba) Luis Casanova

The 1981 Intercontinental Cup was held from August 6 to August 16 in Edmonton, Alberta, Canada. Eight teams participated in the tournament, which was won by the United States national baseball team.

The participating teams included the United States, Canada, Cuba, Japan, Panama, South Korea, the Dominican Republic, and Australia.

The United States secured the championship, with Cuba finishing as the runner-up and the Dominican Republic placing third.

== Medalists ==
The following list of medalists is based on the rosters announced at the start of the tournament.

Gold	Silver	Bronze
United States Bob Batesole; Pat Clements; Mike Dotterer; Burk Goldthorn; Terry Johnson; Dan Jones; Todd Lamb; Gregg Lomnicky; Tony Mack; Oddibe McDowell; Spike Owen; Jim Paciorek; John Russell; Augie Schmidt; Howard Simmons; Dave Stenhouse; Franklin Stubbs; Mike Toothman; Ed Vosberg; Brian Wolcott	Cuba Austin Arias; Orlando Cano; Luis Casanova; Johnny Cordoba; Luis Dominguez; Lourdes Gourriel; Pedro Jova; Francisco Martinez; Victor Mendoza; Victor Mesa; Antonio Muñoz; Hector Olivera; Carmelo Pedroso; Crispin Poveda; Rodolfo Puente; Fernando Sanchez; Wilfredo Sanchez; Alfonso Urquiola	Dominican Republic Juan Caram; Ramon Castro; Junior Gelbal; Federico Javier; Francisco Jimenez; Victor Mercedes; Julio Montas; Ivan Morales; Jose Ortega; Juan Ozoria; Alfredo Paulino; Jose Pelegrin; Jose Peralta; Orlando Pina; Pablo Salas; Juan Sosa; Jony Tavarez; Pedro Taveras; Isidro Valdez

== All-Tournament Team ==
Position	Player
C	(United States) Burk Goldthorn
1B	(Dominican Republic) Victor Mercedes
2B	(Dominican Republic) Orlando Guerrero
3B	(Japan) Shinichi Tani
SS	(South Korea) Kim Jai-bok
LF	(Dominican Republic) Junior Gelbal
CF	(Cuba) Luis Casanova
RF	(Panama) Roberto Dominguez
DH	(United States) John Russell
LHP	(United States) Ed Vosberg
RHP	(South Korea) Choi Dong-won
