= 2016 U-15 Baseball World Cup =

Tournament details
- Country: Japan
- Dates: July 29 – August 7
- Teams: 12
- Defending champions: Cuba

Final positions
- Champions: Cuba (2nd title)
- Runners-up: Japan
- Third place: United States
- Fourth place: Panama

Tournament statistics
- Games played: 50
- Best BA: (Cuba) Malcom Núñez (.613)
- Most HRs: Three tied (1)
- Most SBs: (United States) Anthony Volpe (8)
- Best ERA: (Cuba) Livan Chaviano (0.00)
- Most Ks (as pitcher): (Cuba) Edgar Martínez (20)

Awards
- MVP: (Cuba) Loidel Chapelli

The 2016 U-15 Baseball World Cup or the III U-15 Baseball World Cup was an international baseball tournament held by the World Baseball Softball Confederation for players 15-year-old and younger. The 2016 edition was held in Iwaki, Japan from July 29 to August 7, 2016.

== Format ==
First round: The twelve participating nations were drawn into two groups of 6, in which single round robin will occur. The top 3 nations from each group advances to the Super Round, while the bottom 3 nations from each group advance to the consolation round.

Consolation round: The 6 nations in this round play one game against the teams they have not played yet. (example: The 4th placed team from Group A will play the bottom three teams from Group B)

Super round: The format in the super round is similar to that of the consolation round. Each team plays the top three teams from the opposing group. (example: The 1st placed team from Group B will play the top three teams from Group A) The standings for this round will include the 2 games played against the 2 other second-round qualifiers from the team's first-round group, and the 3 games played in the second round, for a total of 5 games. The 3rd and 4th-place finishers advance to the bronze-medal game, and the 1st and 2nd-place finishers advance to the gold-medal game.

Finals: The Finals consist of the Bronze Medal Game, contested by the 3rd and 4th-place finishers, and the gold-medal game, contested by the 1st and 2nd-place finishers.

== Teams ==
The following 12 teams qualified for the tournament.

Pool A	Pool B
Australia	Mexico
Colombia	New Zealand
Cuba	Panama
Czech Republic	Chinese Taipei ^{1}
Japan	United States
South Korea	Venezuela

^{1}Republic of China, commonly known as Taiwan, due to complicated relations with People's Republic of China, is recognized by the name Chinese Taipei by most of the international organizations in sports competitions. For more information, please see Cross-Strait relations.

== First round ==
- The top three teams in each pool will qualify for the second round.

Qualified for the Super Round
Qualified for the Placement Round

=== Group A ===
Teams	W	L	Pct.	GB	R	RA
Japan	5	0	1.000	—		
Cuba	3	2	.600	2.0		
Colombia	3	2	.600	2.0		
South Korea	2	3	.400	3.0		
Czech Republic	1	4	.200	4.0		
Australia	1	4	.200	4.0		

Date	Local time	Road team	Score	Home team	Inn.	Venue	Game duration	Attendance	Boxscore
Jul 29, 2016	09:00	Czech Republic	4-14	South Korea	F/7	Iwaki Green Stadium	3:05	180	Boxscore
Jul 29, 2016	13:00	Colombia	0-5	Cuba		Nambu Stadium	2:39	150	Boxscore
Jul 29, 2016	19:00	Japan	13-0	Australia	F/7	Iwaki Green Stadium	2:40	4000	Boxscore
Jul 30, 2016	13:30	Australia	0-10	Czech Republic	F/7	Taira Baseball Stadium	2:39	120	Boxscore
Jul 30, 2016	13:30	Colombia	10-5	South Korea		Iwaki Green Stadium	3:40	400	Boxscore
Jul 30, 2016	18:00	Cuba	0-4	Japan		Iwaki Green Stadium	2:30	5000	Boxscore
Jul 31, 2016	10:00	Czech Republic	4-9	Colombia		Nambu Stadium	3:00	150	Boxscore
Jul 31, 2016	13:30	South Korea	4-15	Japan	F/7	Iwaki Green Stadium	2:23	5000	Boxscore
Jul 31, 2016	15:00	Australia	3-4	Cuba		Nambu Stadium	2:42	200	Boxscore
Aug 1, 2016	10:00	Australia	0-12	Colombia	F/7	Nambu Stadium	2:22	50	Boxscore
Aug 1, 2016	13:30	Cuba	3-6	South Korea		Iwaki Green Stadium	3:05	300	Boxscore
Aug 1, 2016	18:00	Japan	15-0	Chinese Taipei	F/5	Iwaki Green Stadium	1:47	2000	Boxscore
Aug 2, 2016	09:00	South Korea	3-4	Australia		Iwaki Green Stadium	3:14	200	Boxscore
Aug 2, 2016	15:00	Czech Republic	1-11	Cuba	F/8	Nambu Stadium	2:31	300	Boxscore
Aug 2, 2016	18:00	Colombia	6-10	Japan		Iwaki Green Stadium	3:27	4000	Boxscore

=== Group B ===
Teams	W	L	Pct.	GB	R	RA
United States	5	0	1.000	—		
Panama	3	2	.600	2.0		
Venezuela	3	2	.600	2.0		
Chinese Taipei	2	3	.400	3.0		
Mexico	2	3	.400	3.0		
New Zealand	0	5	.000	5.0		

Date	Local time	Road team	Score	Home team	Inn.	Venue	Game duration	Attendance	Boxscore
Jul 29, 2016	09:00	Mexico	1-11	Venezuela	F/7	Nambu Stadium	2:52	200	Boxscore
Jul 29, 2016	12:00	New Zealand	1-16	Panama	F/6	Taira Baseball Stadium	2:14	100	Boxscore
Jul 29, 2016	13:00	Chinese Taipei	3-18	United States	F/5	Iwaki Green Stadium	2:29	240	Boxscore
Jul 30, 2016	09:00	Panama	6-4	Chinese Taipei		Iwaki Green Stadium	3:18	600	Boxscore
Jul 30, 2016	10:00	Mexico	11-3	New Zealand		Nambu Stadium	3:08	150	Boxscore
Jul 30, 2016	15:00	Venezuela	2-4	United States		Nambu Stadium	3:04	300	Boxscore
Jul 31, 2016	09:00	Mexico	8-9	Chinese Taipei		Iwaki Green Stadium	4:01	841	Boxscore
Jul 31, 2016	13:30	Venezuela	16-3	South Korea	F/7	Taira Baseball Stadium	2:55	100	Boxscore
Jul 31, 2016	18:00	United States	11-1	Panama	F/7	Iwaki Green Stadium	2:15	200	Boxscore
Aug 1, 2016	09:00	Chinese Taipei	8-10	Venezuela		Iwaki Green Stadium	3:34	500	Boxscore
Aug 1, 2016	13:30	New Zealand	1-16	United States	F/6	Taira Baseball Stadium	2:22	100	Boxscore
Aug 1, 2016	15:00	Panama	3-5	Mexico		Nambu Stadium	2:34	250	Boxscore
Aug 2, 2016	10:00	Panama	7-6	Venezuela		Nambu Stadium	3:08	200	Boxscore
Aug 2, 2016	13:30	United States	16-0	Mexico	F/6	Taira Baseball Stadium	3:38	250	Boxscore
Aug 2, 2016	13:30	New Zealand	4-10	Chinese Taipei		Iwaki Green Stadium	3:02	200	Boxscore

== Super round ==
Qualified for the Final
Qualified for the Third-place game

Teams	W	L	Pct.	GB	R	RA
Japan	4	1	.800	-		
Cuba	4	1	.800	-		
United States	3	2	.600	1.0		
Panama	2	3	.400	2.0		
Venezuela	1	4	.200	3.0		
Colombia	1	4	.200	3.0		

Date	Local time	Road team	Score	Home team	Inn.	Venue	Game duration	Attendance	Boxscore
Aug 4, 2016	09:00	Colombia	4-14	Panama	F/8	Iwaki Green Stadium	2:48	150	Boxscore
Aug 4, 2016	13:30	Cuba	11-2	United States		Iwaki Green Stadium	3:12	300	Boxscore
Aug 4, 2016	18:00	Venezuela	0-8	Japan		Iwaki Green Stadium	2:45	800	Boxscore
Aug 5, 2016	09:00	Cuba	5-2	Panama		Iwaki Green Stadium	3:02	160	Boxscore
Aug 5, 2016	15:00	Colombia	3-5	Venezuela		Nambu Stadium	2:41	150	Boxscore
Aug 5, 2016	18:00	United States	5-2	Japan		Iwaki Green Stadium	2:56	4500	Boxscore
Aug 6, 2016	09:00	Venezuela	2-4	Cuba		Iwaki Green Stadium	2:46	120	Boxscore
Aug 6, 2016	13:30	Colombia	7-5	United States	F/10	Iwaki Green Stadium	3:20	105	Boxscore
Aug 6, 2016	18:00	Panama	1-2	Japan		Iwaki Green Stadium	2:28	2000	Boxscore

== Consoltion Round ==
Teams	W	L	Pct.	GB	R	RA
Chinese Taipei	5	0	1.000	-		
South Korea	3	2	.600	2.0		
Mexico	3	2	.600	2.0		
Czech Republic	2	3	.400	3.0		
Australia	2	3	.400	3.0		
New Zealand	0	5	.000	5.0		

Date	Local time	Road team	Score	Home team	Inn.	Venue	Game duration	Attendance	Boxscore
Aug 4, 2016	10:00	New Zealand	0-10	Czech Republic	F/7	Nambu Stadium	2:06	50	Boxscore
Aug 4, 2016	13:30	Australia	2-8	Chinese Taipei		Taira Baseball Stadium	2:57	25	Boxscore
Aug 4, 2016	15:00	Mexico	4-14	South Korea	F/7	Nambu Stadium	3:13	100	Boxscore
Aug 5, 2016	10:00	Australia	25-11	New Zealand		Nambu Stadium		150	Boxscore
Aug 5, 2016	13:30	Czech Republic	4-9	Mexico		Taira Baseball Stadium	3:28	70	Boxscore
Aug 5, 2016	13:30	South Korea	4-5	Chinese Taipei		Iwaki Green Stadium	3:10	200	Boxscore
Aug 6, 2016	10:00	New Zealand	0-10	South Korea	F/7	Nambu Stadium	2:04	50	Boxscore
Aug 6, 2016	13:30	Czech Republic	0-10	Chinese Taipei	F/8	Taira Baseball Stadium	2:34	70	Boxscore
Aug 6, 2016	15:00	Australia	5-8	Mexico		Nambu Stadium	2:48	100	Boxscore

== Finals ==
=== Third-place game ===
Date	Local time	Road team	Score	Home team	Inn.	Venue	Game duration	Attendance	Boxscore
Aug 7, 2016	10:00	Panama	3-8	United States		Iwaki Green Stadium	2:50	500	Boxscore

=== Championship ===
Date	Local time	Road team	Score	Home team	Inn.	Venue	Game duration	Attendance	Boxscore
Aug 7, 2016	14:30	Cuba	9-4	Japan		Iwaki Green Stadium	2:54	3000	Boxscore

== Medalists ==
Event	Gold	Silver	Bronze
Tournament	Cuba; Randy Alonso; Marcos Betancourt; Harbin Castellanos; Daniel Castillo; Loidel Chapelli; Livan Chaviano; Franny Cobos; Sixto Echemedndía; Rolando Espinosa; Edgar Martínez; Jhonatan Martínez; Ubert Mejías; Víctor Mesa Jr. Malcom Núñez; Hansel Otamendi; Darian Palma; Andrys Perez; Andy Quesada; Osdany Rodríguez; Osiel Rodríguez	Japan; Yuma Fugo; Kaisei Hoshiko; Kotaro Hoshino; Kenji Ino; Shota Katekaru; Masaya Kitada; Daiki Kondo; Shoki Koyama; Taisei Kurosu; Takehiro Masuki; Hiroya Miyagi; Yuito Nakata; Minon Noguchi; Kanta Okada; Masaki Oyokawa; Yuki Sakurai; Ryusei Suzuki; Yumeto Taguchi; Kenshin Tsuji; Taiyo Ueda	United States; Nelson Berkwich; Coleman Brigman; Gabriel Briones; Christian Cairo; Justin Campbell; Jasiah Dixon; Cade Doughty; Sanson Faltine; Nick Gorby; Tony Jacob; Jared Jones; Ethan Long; Zachary Martinez; Joe Naranjo; Colton Olasin; Wesley Scott; Landon Sims; Anthony Volpe; Nate Wohlgemuth; Carter Young

== Final standings ==
Rk	Team	W	L
1	Cuba	7	2
Lost in Final
2	Japan	7	2
Failed to qualify for the Final
3	United States	7	2
Lost in 3rd Place Game
4	Panama	4	5
Failed to qualify for the finals
5	Venezuela	4	4
6	Colombia	4	4
Failed to qualify for the super round
7	Chinese Taipei	5	3
8	South Korea	4	4
9	Mexico	4	4
10	Czech Republic	2	6
11	Australia	2	6
12	New Zealand	0	8
