= Baseball World Cup =

International baseball competition

- Most recent season or competition: 2011 Baseball World Cup
- The John Moores Trophy awarded in 1938
- Sport: Baseball
- Founded: 1938
- Folded: 2011
- No. of teams: 16 (in 2011)
- Continent: International
- Last champion: Netherlands
- Most titles: Cuba (25 titles)

The Baseball World Cup (BWC) was an international baseball tournament for national teams around the world, sanctioned by the International Baseball Federation (IBAF). First held in 1938 as the Amateur World Series (AWS), it was, for most of its history, the highest level of international baseball competition in the world. Even after it was supplanted in this regard in 2006 by the modern World Baseball Classic (WBC), the Baseball World Cup was still considered by the IBAF to be a major world championship, along with the WBC and the Summer Olympic Games.

Early international baseball competition followed the strict Olympic rules on amateurism, prohibiting "professional" players from leagues such as Major League Baseball and its upper minor league teams. Because of this, the tournament was dominated by countries with strong traditions in amateur sports, such as Cuba, which dissolved its professional baseball league after the Cuban Revolution. The tournament was eventually opened to professionals, with minor league players competing, though the desire to use top-level, major league players spurred the creation of the World Baseball Classic.

After the 2011 tournament, the Baseball World Cup was discontinued in favor of an expanded WBC with direct qualification; the World Baseball Softball Confederation (WBSC) – successor to the IBAF – now organizes the WBC and awards its winner the title of "World Champion." Additionally, the WBSC sanctions two new tournaments: the biennial 23U Baseball World Cup (begun as the 21U Baseball World Cup in 2014) and its quadrennial, flagship tournament, the WBSC Premier12 (starting in 2015), which involves the twelve best-ranked national teams in the world.

== History ==
The Baseball World Cup was held 38 times; the final one was in 2011 in Panama. The first tournament, held in 1938, featured only two teams, but the last tournament included 22 participants; the previous two featured 16 and 18 teams (in 2007 and 2005, respectively). The World Cup was originally called the Amateur World Series, until the tournament in 1988.

The idea of a baseball competition for national teams was championed by International Baseball Federation (IBF) president Leslie Mann. After managing to include baseball as a demonstration sport at the 1936 Berlin Olympics, Mann sought to organize an international tournament in 1937 between the national teams of the United States and Japan; this plan was derailed by the outbreak of the Second Sino-Japanese War that same year. Instead, Mann wrote to John Moores, president of the British National Baseball Association (the precursor to the modern British Baseball Federation) to organize a tournament between the U.S. and Great Britain teams. The 1938 "John Moores Cup," as it was originally called, would be retroactively recognized as the first Amateur World Series.

Mann, along with Cuban sports administrator Jaime Mariné, helped turn the Amateur World Series into an annual event in 1939, this time held in Cuba. The first and second tournaments featured only two and three national teams, respectively, but seven participants were invited to the 1940 edition and the pool would only expand from there.

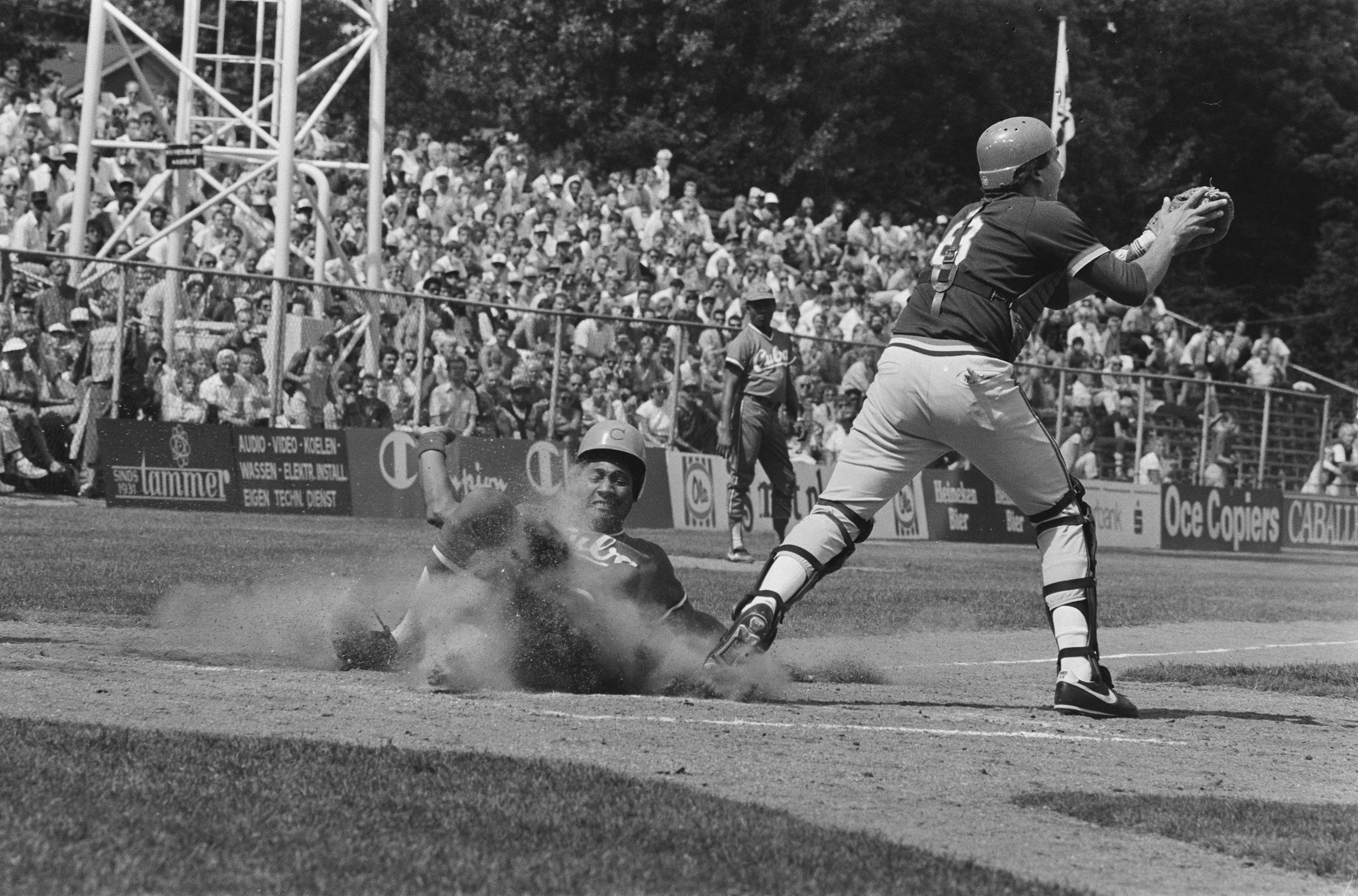
Lourdes Gurriel at the 1986 AWS

For much of its early existence, the competition was limited to the nations of Central America and the Caribbean; the United States withdrew early from the 1942 series, and would not return until 1969. The next edition, in 1970, saw two European national teams (Italy and the Netherlands) participate for the first time; in 1972, Japan became the first Asian country to participate in the global baseball tournament.

Until 1998 the competition was limited to strictly amateur players. After 1998, professional minor league players competed, but Major League Baseball did not release its players to participate. In the months leading up to the high-profile first World Baseball Classic in 2006, many commentators heralded it as a "Baseball World Cup", perhaps not realizing that a tournament of that description already existed and had for almost seventy years.

However, the 2006 World Baseball Classic was the first international baseball tournament to include active players from the top-level major leagues around the world — namely Major League Baseball and Nippon Professional Baseball — making it a closer equivalent to the world cups of other sports such as soccer, which commonly include players from the most prestigious professional leagues, than to the mostly-amateur Baseball World Cup.

== Trophy ==
The champions of the first several Amateur World Series tournaments were presented the John Moores Trophy, named in honor of John Moores, a sponsor of the British Baseball Federation and future Everton F.C. executive. Like the Stanley Cup, it was a single trophy passed from winner to winner, with the names of the world champions engraved; however, only the winners of the 1938, 1939, and 1940 editions are engraved (England and Cuba); the United States withdrew from the AWS in 1942, and the trophy was apparently not awarded after that. (Note: The John Moores Trophy does reflect two tournaments in 1950 and 1956, won by the United States and Hawaii, respectively, but these were not Amateur World Series.)

When Jaime Mariné succeeded Leslie Mann as president of the IBF during the 1940 Amateur World Series, he renamed the trophy the Copa Presidente Batista, after Fulgencio Batista, the president of Cuba. Mariné had participated in the Cuban Revolution of 1933 that brought Batista to power and had organized the dictator's Military Intelligence Service in 1935.

== Tournament results ==
Year	Final Host	Final four				Number of teams
Year	Final Host	Champions	Runners-up	3rd place	4th place	Number of teams
Amateur World Series
1938; Details	(United Kingdom); Great Britain	Great Britain	United States	–	–	2
1939; Details	Cuba	Cuba	Nicaragua	United States	–	3
1940; Details	Cuba	Cuba	Nicaragua	United States	Venezuela	7
1941; Details	Cuba	Venezuela	Cuba	Mexico	Panama	9
1942; Details	Cuba	Cuba	Dominican Republic	Venezuela	Mexico	5
1943; Details	Cuba	Cuba	Mexico	Dominican Republic	Panama	4
1944; Details	Venezuela	Venezuela	Mexico	Cuba	Panama	8
1945; Details	Venezuela	Venezuela	Colombia	Panama	Nicaragua	6
1947; Details	Colombia	Colombia	Puerto Rico	Nicaragua	Mexico	9
1948; Details	Nicaragua	Dominican Republic	Puerto Rico	Colombia	Mexico	8
1950; Details	Nicaragua	Cuba	Dominican Republic	Venezuela	Panama	12
1951; Details	Mexico	Puerto Rico	Venezuela	Cuba	Dominican Republic	11
1952; Details	Cuba	Cuba	Dominican Republic	Puerto Rico	Panama	13
1953; Details	Venezuela	Cuba	Venezuela	Nicaragua	Dominican Republic	11
1961; Details	Costa Rica	Cuba	Mexico	Venezuela	Panama	10
1965; Details	Colombia	Colombia	Mexico	Puerto Rico	Panama	9
1969; Details	Dominican Republic	Cuba	United States	Dominican Republic	Venezuela	11
1970; Details	Colombia	Cuba	United States	Puerto Rico	Colombia	12
1971; Details	Cuba	Cuba	Colombia	Nicaragua	Puerto Rico	10
1972; Details	Nicaragua	Cuba	United States	Nicaragua	Japan	16
1973; Details	Cuba	Cuba	Puerto Rico	Venezuela	Dominican Republic	8
1973; Details	Nicaragua	United States	Nicaragua	Puerto Rico	Colombia	11
1974; Details	United States	United States	Nicaragua	Colombia	Dominican Republic	9
1976; Details	Colombia	Cuba	Puerto Rico	Japan	Nicaragua	11
1978; Details	Italy	Cuba	United States	South Korea	Japan	11
1980; Details	Japan	Cuba	South Korea	Japan	United States	12
1982; Details	South Korea	South Korea	Japan	United States	Chinese Taipei	10
1984; Details	Cuba	Cuba	Chinese Taipei	United States	Japan	13
1986; Details	Netherlands	Cuba	South Korea	Chinese Taipei	United States	12
Baseball World Cup
1988; Details	Italy	Cuba	United States	Chinese Taipei	Japan	12
1990; Details	Canada	Cuba	Nicaragua	South Korea	Puerto Rico	12
1994; Details	Nicaragua	Cuba	South Korea	Japan	Nicaragua	16
1998; Details	Italy	Cuba	South Korea	Nicaragua	Italy	16
2001; Details	Taiwan	Cuba	United States	Chinese Taipei	Japan	16
2003; Details	Cuba	Cuba	Panama	Japan	Chinese Taipei	16
2005; Details	Netherlands	Cuba	South Korea	Panama	Netherlands	18
2007; Details	Taiwan	United States	Cuba	Japan	Netherlands	16
2009; Details	Italy	United States	Cuba	Canada	Puerto Rico	22
2011; Details	Panama	Netherlands	Cuba	Canada	United States	16

== Medal table ==
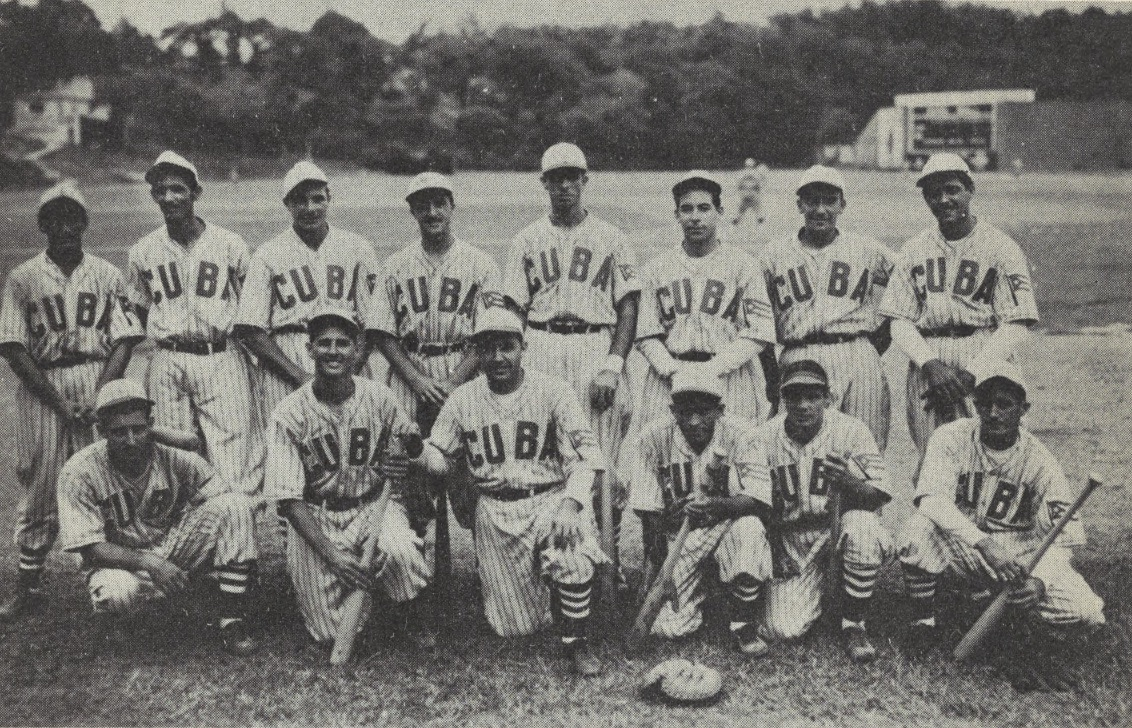
Cuba won its first world championship in 1939

Rank	Country	Gold	Silver	Bronze	Total
1	Cuba	25	4	2	31
2	United States	4	7	4	15
3	Venezuela	3	2	4	9
4	Colombia	2	2	2	6
5	South Korea	1	5	2	8
6	Puerto Rico	1	4	4	9
7	Dominican Republic	1	3	2	6
8	Great Britain	1	0	0	1
8	Netherlands	1	0	0	1
10	Nicaragua	0	5	5	10
11	Mexico	0	4	1	5
12	Japan	0	1	5	6
13	Chinese Taipei	0	1	3	4
14	Panama	0	1	2	3
15	Canada	0	0	2	2
Total		39	39	38	116

== Individual honors ==
=== Most Valuable Player ===
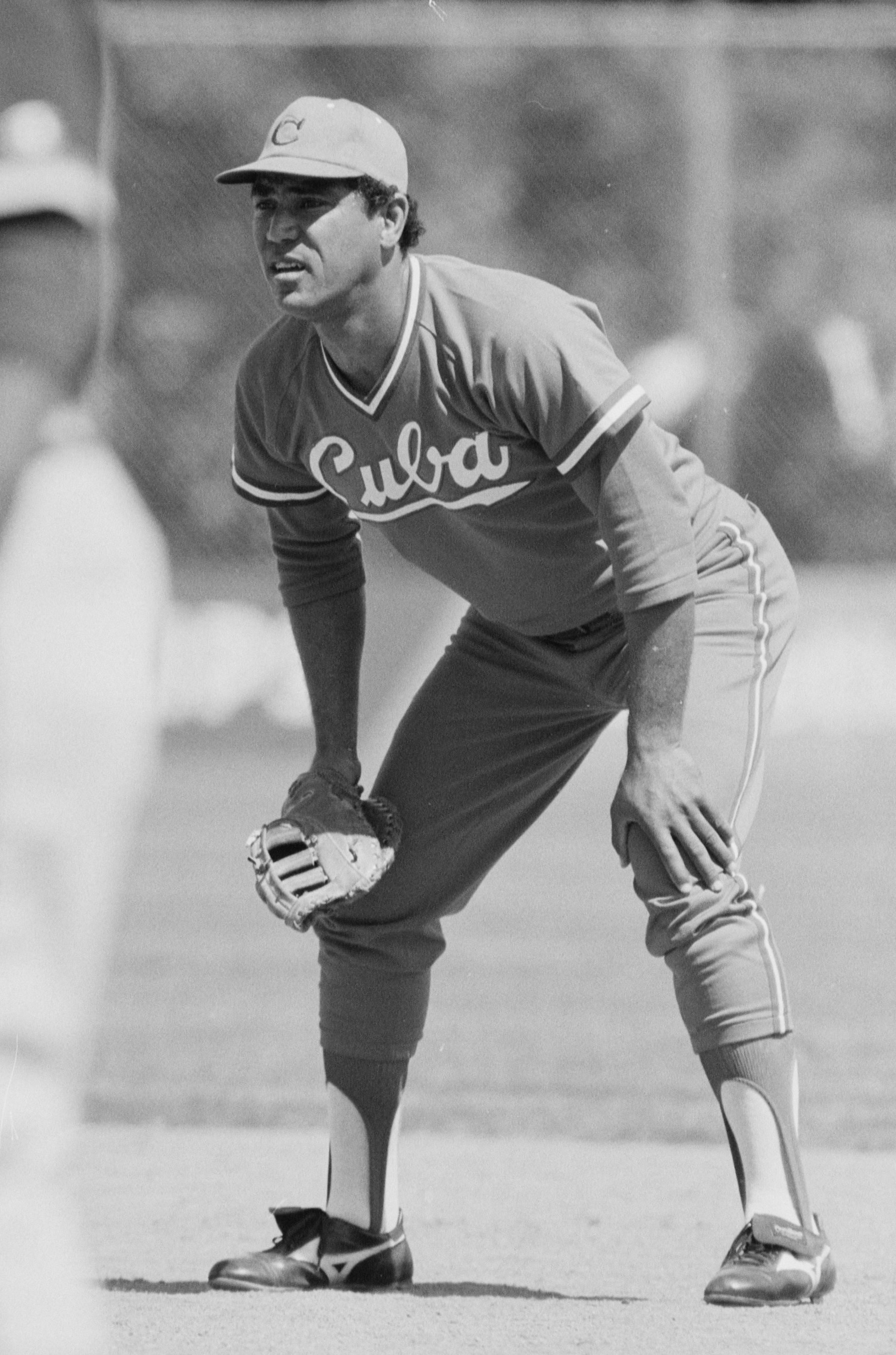
Antonio Muñoz won MVP in 1978 and 1980

Year	Player	Position	Ref.
1938	—N/a		
1939	(Cuba) Juan "Cocoliso" Torres	Outfielder	
1940	(Cuba) Conrado Marrero	Pitcher	
1941	(Venezuela) José Antonio Casanova	Shortstop	
1942	(Cuba) Andrés Fleitas	Catcher	
1943	(Cuba) Pedro Jiménez	Pitcher	
1944	—N/a		
1945	(Venezuela) Héctor Benítez	Outfielder	
1947	(Puerto Rico) Saturnino Escalera	First baseman	
1948	(Dominican Republic) Ramón del Monte	Pitcher	
1950	(Cuba) Juan Izaguirre	Infielder	
1951	—N/a		
1952	—N/a		
1953	(Venezuela) Andrés Quintero	Pitcher	
1961	—N/a		
1965	—N/a		
1969	(Cuba) Gaspar Pérez	Pitcher	
1970	(Colombia) Abel Leal	Outfielder	
1971	(Cuba) Rodolfo Puente	Infielder	
1972	—N/a		
1973 (XXI)	(Cuba) Agustín Marquetti	Infielder	
1973 (XXII)	—N/a		
1974	—N/a		
1976	—N/a		
1978	(Cuba) Antonio Muñoz	First baseman	
1980	(Cuba) Antonio Muñoz	First baseman	
1980	(South Korea) Sun Dong-yol	Pitcher	
1984	(Cuba) Víctor Mesa	Outfielder	
1986	—N/a		
1988	(United States) Tino Martinez	First baseman	
1990	(Cuba) Orestes Kindelán	First baseman	
1994	(Cuba) Lourdes Gourriel	Outfielder	
1998	(Cuba) Antonio Pacheco	Second baseman	
2001	(Cuba) Luis Ulacia	Outfielder	
2003	(Japan) Takashi Yoshiura	Outfielder	
2005	(Cuba) Eduardo Paret	Shortstop	
2007	(United States) Jayson Nix	Infielder	
2009	(United States) Justin Smoak	First baseman	
2011	(Netherlands) Curt Smith	First baseman	

== See also ==
- Women's Baseball World Cup
- Baseball awards#World
- Baseball at the Summer Olympics
- Intercontinental Cup
- International Amateur Baseball Tournament
- Global World Series
- WBSC Premier12
- World Baseball Classic
