= Ramón Peña =

Dominican baseball player (born 1962)

- Relief pitcher
- Born: May 5, 1962 (age 63); Santiago, Dominican Republic
- Batted: Right Threw: Right

MLB debut
- April 27, 1989, for the Detroit Tigers

Last MLB appearance
- August 5, 1989, for the Detroit Tigers

MLB statistics
- Win–loss record: 0–0
- Earned run average: 6.00
- Strikeouts: 12
- Stats at Baseball Reference

Teams
- Detroit Tigers (1989)
Medals
Men's baseball
Representing Dominican Republic
Pan American Games
Silver medal – second place	1979 San Juan	Team
Central American and Caribbean Games
Gold medal – first place	1982 Havana	Team

Ramón Arturo Peña Padilla (born May 5, 1962) is a Dominican former professional baseball relief pitcher who played one season for the Detroit Tigers of the Major League Baseball (MLB). He is the brother of former MLB catcher Tony Peña and the uncle of former pitcher Tony Peña Jr.

== Career ==
He was initially signed by the Pittsburgh Pirates as an amateur free agent in 1980, but was released prior to the start of the 1982 season. In 1984 he was signed by the Tigers, spending five seasons in their minor league organization before making his major league debut in 1989. Since Ramón was in the American League while Tony was playing for the St. Louis Cardinals of the National League, and since interleague play didn't begin until 1997, the two brothers never played against each other in the major leagues.

His career was much shorter and less successful than those of his two relatives. In eight career regular season games, had a lifetime earned run average of 6.00, allowing twelve earned runs in eighteen innings, as well as a WHIP of 1.89. Although he didn't earn a decision in any of his eight appearances, he didn't pitch a game in which his team earned the win. He made his major league debut on April 27, 1989 against the California Angels at Anaheim Stadium in Anaheim, California. Peña surrendered three runs on seven hits in 2 2/3 innings in a relief appearance in a 10-3 Tigers loss. Oddly, despite his rather high 6.00 earned run average, he did not surrender a home run to any of the 88 batters he faced in the major leagues.

During his five seasons in the Tigers' farm system, Peña served as a part-time closer for the Class-A Lakeland Tigers of the Florida State League, the Double-A Birmingham Barons of the Southern League, and the Triple-A Toledo Mud Hens of the International League before being recalled in 1989 to play for the Tigers. In the minor leagues, Peña had a lifetime record of 34-33, an ERA of 3.05, as well as 50 saves.

Peña served as the Tigers’ special assistant to general manager Dave Dombrowski until he was fired on May 17, 2006.

== See also ==
- Major League Baseball players from the Dominican Republic
