= 1978 Amateur World Series =

Tournament details
- Country: Italy
- Dates: 25 August – 6 September
- Teams: 11
- Defending champions: Cuba

Final positions
- Champions: Cuba (15th title)
- Runners-up: United States
- Third place: South Korea
- Fourth place: Japan

The 1978 Amateur World Series was the 25th Amateur World Series (AWS), an international men's amateur baseball tournament. The tournament was sanctioned by the International Baseball Federation (which titled it the Baseball World Cup as of the 1988 tournament). The tournament took place in Italy, only the second time outside the Americas, from 25 August to 6 September, and was won by Cuba – its 15th AWS victory.

There were 11 participating countries, including first-time participants Belgium and Australia.

== Final standings ==
Rank	Team
1	Cuba
2	United States
3	South Korea
4	Japan
5	Nicaragua
6	Italy
7	Netherlands
8	Mexico
9	Canada
10	Australia
11	Belgium

== Honors and awards ==
=== Statistical leaders ===
Batting leaders
Statistic	Name	Total
Batting average	(Nicaragua) Roberto Espino	.500
Hits	(Nicaragua) Roberto Espino (Cuba) Luis Casanova	16
Runs	(Cuba) Antonio Muñoz (United States) Tim Wallach	14
Home runs	(Cuba) Antonio Muñoz	8
Runs batted in	(Cuba) Antonio Muñoz	18
Stolen bases	(Japan) Mitsugu Kobayashi	13

Pitching leaders
Statistic	Name	Total
Wins	(South Korea) Choi Dong-won (Japan) Shigekazu Mori	4
Earned run average	(United States) Mark Thurmond	0.00
Strikeouts	(South Korea) Choi Dong-won	45

=== Awards ===
Award	Player	Ref.
Most Valuable Player	(Cuba) Antonio Muñoz	
