= Sherwin Cijntje =

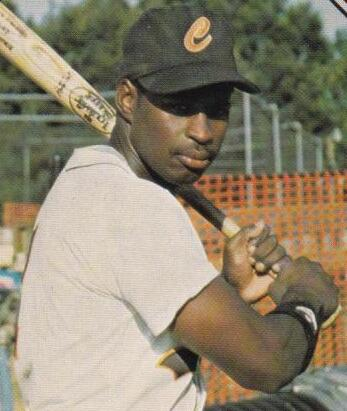
- Cijntje with the Charlotte Knights c. 1988
- Outfielder
- Born: March 2, 1964 (age 62); Curaçao
- Bats: Left Throws: Left
Medals
Men's baseball
Representing Netherlands Antilles
Central American and Caribbean Games
Bronze medal – third place	1982 Havana	Team

Sherwin P. Cijntje (SAIN-ja; born March 2, 1964) is a Curaçaoan former professional baseball outfielder who played for the Netherlands Antilles national baseball team, professionally in Minor League Baseball, and in the Dutch Honkbal Hoofdklasse.

Cijntje did not play baseball or even see baseball played in person until he was 15 years old, when a man came to his town of about 80 people and began teaching the sport.

He played for the Netherlands Antilles in the 1982 Central American and Caribbean Games. The team had a 3–3 record in the tournament winning the bronze medal.

Cijntje was the first Curaçaoan to play professional baseball in the United States. He played Minor League Baseball from 1983 to 1989 in the Baltimore Orioles system and in 1989 in the Cleveland Indians system. He played for the Bluefield Orioles in the Rookie Appalachian League in 1983 and 1984, before advancing to the Low-A Newark Orioles in 1985, the High-A Hagestown Suns in 1986, and Double-A Charlotte O's and Triple-A Rochester Red Wings in 1987. His best offensive season was 1987, when he had a .301 batting average, .781 on-base plus slugging, and 34 stolen bases combined in Charlotte and Rochester. He peaked on the basepaths stealing 51 bases in 1986, when he was Carolina League All-Star.

In September 1987, Cijntje was added to Baltimore's 40-man roster, becoming the first player from the Netherlands Antilles to be added to an MLB roster. Going into the 1988 season, he was ranked as the Oriole's #7 prospect by Baseball America.

In 1988, Cijntje again split time between Rochester and Charlotte, with his offensive production plummeting. He hit a combined .247 with 27 steals. In 1989, he played 27 games in Rochester and 57 games in Hagerstown, now a Double-A team, before moving on to Cleveland's system, playing 17 games Double-A Canton–Akron to finish his affiliated career. Overall, he hit .270 with 588 hits and 184 stolen bases in 642 minor league games.

Cijntje later played in the Dutch Hoofdklasse. He led the league with a .386 batting average in 1991 and was third in the league in stolen bases for Kinheim in 1997. After retiring, he was the first base coach for the Amsterdam Pirates in 2022 and 2023.
