= Tim Wallach =

American baseball player and coach (born 1957)

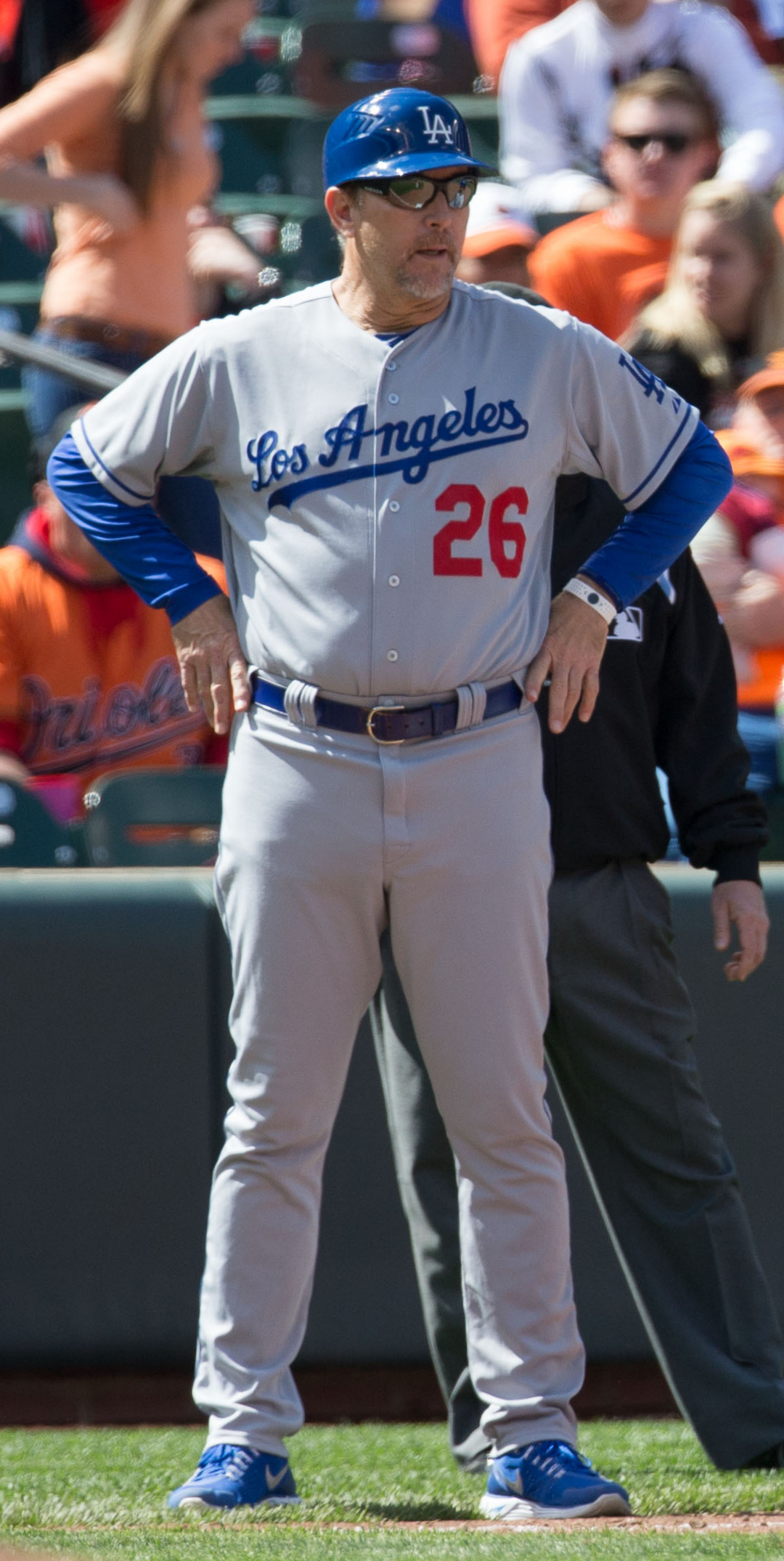
- Wallach as a coach with the Los Angeles Dodgers
- Third baseman
- Born: September 14, 1957 (age 68); Huntington Park, California, U.S.
- Batted: Right Threw: Right

MLB debut
- September 6, 1980, for the Montreal Expos

Last MLB appearance
- September 29, 1996, for the Los Angeles Dodgers

MLB statistics
- Batting average: .257
- Hits: 2,085
- Home runs: 260
- Runs batted in: 1,125
- Stats at Baseball Reference

Teams
- As player: Montreal Expos (1980–1992); Los Angeles Dodgers (1993–1995); California Angels (1996); Los Angeles Dodgers (1996); As coach: Los Angeles Dodgers (2004–2005, 2010–2015); Miami Marlins (2016–2019)

Career highlights and awards
- 5× All-Star (1984, 1985, 1987, 1989, 1990); 3× Gold Glove Award (1985, 1988, 1990); 2× Silver Slugger Award (1985, 1987); Golden Spikes Award (1979); Montreal Expos Hall of Fame

Member of the Canadian

Baseball Hall of Fame
- Induction: 2014
Medals
Men's baseball
Representing United States
Amateur World Series
Silver medal – second place	1978 Italy	Team

Timothy Charles Wallach (born September 14, 1957), nicknamed "Eli", is an American former professional baseball player and coach. He played seventeen seasons in Major League Baseball (MLB) as a third baseman, most notably for the Montreal Expos from 1980 to 1992. A five-time All-Star, Wallach excelled as an offensive and as a defensive player, winning 2 Silver Slugger Awards and 3 Gold Glove Awards. In addition to the Expos, he also played for the Los Angeles Dodgers and California Angels and coached for the Dodgers and Miami Marlins.

== Early life ==
Wallach was born on September 14, 1957, in Huntington Park, California, a working-class suburb of Los Angeles. He grew up in Tustin in Orange County, and attended University High School in neighboring Irvine. There he played on the school's lower-level baseball team during his freshman and sophomore years before being promoted to the varsity team for his last two years. Wallach was not drafted by a major league team out of high school. He enrolled at Saddleback College and transferred to California State University, Fullerton to play college baseball for the Cal State Fullerton Titans.

Wallach played for the United States national baseball team in the 1978 Amateur World Series. His stat-line in the series was .395/.455/.763, while having 14 runs and runs batted in (RBIs), both being the second-most in the series. The United States finished second to Cuba in the tournament. Wallach led the Titans to its first Division I title at the College World Series in Omaha in 1979, was named to the all-tournament team, and won the Golden Spikes Award. He was an All-American and named the Sporting News College Player of the Year.

== Career ==
=== Montreal Expos (1980–1992) ===
Wallach, in the foreground, playing third base for the Expos against the St. Louis Cardinals in 1991

Wallach made his major league debut at the age of 22 on September 6, 1980, against the San Francisco Giants after replacing Ron LeFlore at left field. In his first plate appearance in the top of the 5th inning, he was walked, but in his second plate appearance in the 8th, he hit a home run. Wallach and Brett Pill (September 6, 2011) are the only two players from Cal State Fullerton to hit a home run in their first at bat. Wallach appeared in four other games in that season. He appeared in 71 games in the following season, hitting .236 with 4 home runs and 13 RBIs in 71 games. He appeared in the Expos' only postseason run while in Montreal, appearing in five games. In Game 1 of the 1981 National League Division Series, he went 1-for-2 with a double and a walk while scoring a run. In the other four games that he appeared in, he went hitless.

1982 was Wallach's first full-time season, when he hit .268 with 28 home runs, 31 doubles, and 97 RBIs in 158 games. He slightly regressed the following year, hitting .269 with 33 doubles, 19 home runs, and 70 RBIs in 156 games. Wallach earned his first All-Star Game honors in 1984 and 1985; in the latter season he earned his first Gold Glove and the Silver Slugger awards. He regressed a bit the next season, playing in 134 games while having 112 hits, 22 doubles, 18 home runs and 71 RBIs with a .233 batting average, although he led the league in being hit by pitch with 10.

In 1987, Wallach was named to the All-Star Game again while winning his second Silver Slugger Award and finishing fourth in Most Valuable Player voting, doing so in 153 games while setting career highs with a .298 batting average, 123 RBIs and 42 doubles, with the latter leading the major leagues. He regressed a bit the next season, hitting .257 with 32 doubles, 12 home runs and 69 RBIs in 159 games, although he did win his second Gold Glove. He rebounded in 1989, being named to the All-Star Game, playing in 154 games and hitting .277 with 13 home runs, 77 RBIs and a league-leading 42 doubles. He continued his success in 1990, earning his fifth and final All-Star Game appearance, playing in a career high 161 games and hitting .296 with 37 doubles, 21 home runs and 98 RBIs, as well as winning the Gold Glove for the third and final time. He was named team captain prior to the 1991 season, being the first team captain in franchise history. He regressed in production in his final two seasons with the Expos, playing in 301 combined games while having a total of 250 hits, 51 doubles, 22 home runs and 132 RBIs while hitting under .230 both seasons. On December 24, 1992, he was traded to the Los Angeles Dodgers for Tim Barker.

=== Later career (1993–1996) ===
Wallach played in 133 games for the Dodgers, getting 106 hits (his lowest since having 112 in 1986), with 19 doubles, 12 home runs and 62 RBIs with a .222 batting average. In the strike shortened 1994 season, he played in 113 games (out of 114 that the Dodgers played), having 116 hits, 21 doubles and 23 home runs (his highest since having 21 in 1990) with 78 RBIs and a .280 batting average. He finished 18th in MVP voting. He played in just 97 games for the Dodgers in 1995, having 87 hits (his lowest since having 50 in 1981) with 22 doubles, nine home runs and 38 RBIs and a .266 batting average. He appeared in the team's postseason run, playing in each game of the NLDS. He went 1-for-12, with no RBIs as the Dodgers were swept in three. After the season ended, he signed as a free agent with the California Angels. He played in 57 games with the team, having 45 hits, seven doubles, eight home runs and 20 RBIs with 47 strikeouts on a .237 batting average. He was granted free agency on July 19, 1996, signing with the Dodgers six days later. He played in 45 games while having 37 hits, three doubles, four home runs and 22 RBIs on a .228 batting average. He appeared in the postseason run, appearing in each game of the NLDS against the Atlanta Braves. He went 0-for-11 as they were swept. In his final regular season game on September 29, 1996, he went 1-for-4. In his final at bat (done in the 10th inning), he hit a single off Dario Veras of the San Diego Padres.

== Career statistics and achievements ==
In 8,099 career at-bats, Wallach had 2,085 hits. He batted .257 with 260 home runs and 1,125 RBIs. Wallach had 908 career runs scored. Wallach holds the Expos and Nationals team record for most games played. He held the team records for most runs batted in and hits until in 2017 Ryan Zimmerman surpassed Wallach's runs batted in total and in 2018 Zimmerman surpassed Wallach's hits total. Wallach was one of the last Major League Baseball players to wear a flapless batting helmet, after Tim Raines and Gary Gaetti and equal with Ozzie Smith.

Wallach won three Gold Glove awards for defensive excellence and two Silver Slugger awards for offensive excellence. He was named to five All-Star teams. Wallach spent the majority of his career with the Expos, forming a potent lineup with teammates Tim Raines, Gary Carter and Andre Dawson. He was voted the Montreal Expos Player of the Year in 1987, 1989 and 1990. Bill James has referred to Wallach as a "poor man's Brooks Robinson", largely because of his defensive skills.

On June 21, 2014, Tim Wallach was inducted into the Canadian Baseball Hall of Fame in St. Marys, Ontario, along with former Montreal Expos play-by-play announcer Dave Van Horne and former Montreal Expos general manager Murray Cook.

== Coaching career ==
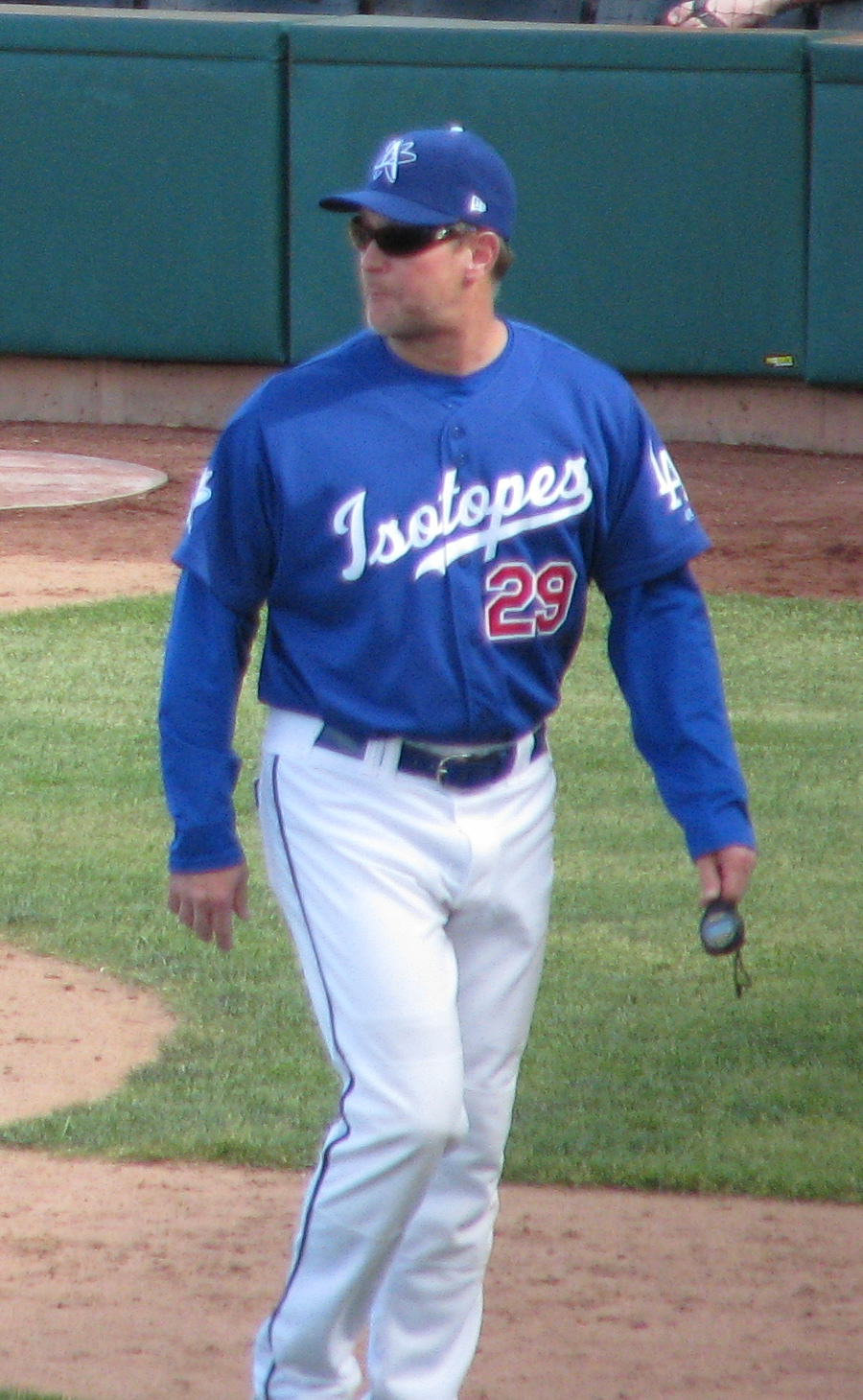
Wallach as manager of the Albuquerque Isotopes, Triple-A affiliates of the Dodgers, in 2010

In 2004 and 2005, Wallach was the hitting coach of the Los Angeles Dodgers. When Grady Little became the manager and replaced Jim Tracy in December 2005, Wallach remained hitting coach until he was replaced by Eddie Murray. On January 12, 2009, he was named the manager for the Triple-A Albuquerque Isotopes in the Dodgers organization. He led the Isotopes into the playoffs with a franchise record 80 wins and was named as Pacific Coast League Manager of the Year.

On November 22, 2010, he was named the new third base coach for the Los Angeles Dodgers. In late 2013, Wallach interviewed for managerial jobs with the Detroit Tigers and Seattle Mariners. When he missed out on those jobs, the Dodgers announced that he would be promoted to bench coach for the 2014 season.

On December 4, 2015, he was announced as the new bench coach for the Miami Marlins, a position he held through the conclusion of the 2019 season.

== Personal life ==
Wallach has three sons (Matt, Brett and Chad) with his wife, Lori. Matt was drafted by the Dodgers in the 22nd round of the 2007 MLB draft as a catcher out of California State University Fullerton. Brett was drafted by the Dodgers as a pitcher in the 3rd round of the 2009 MLB draft out of Orange Coast College and then traded to the Chicago Cubs in 2010. Chad was a catcher for California State University Fullerton who was selected by the Miami Marlins in the 5th round of the 2013 MLB draft and was traded to the Cincinnati Reds in 2014. Chad was named Miami Marlins Minor League Player of the Month for June 2014 and was the starting catcher for the South Atlantic League Northern Division All-Stars in June 2014 as a member of the Greensboro Grasshoppers. On August 25, 2017, Chad was called up by the Reds.

Wallach's nickname, "Eli", is in reference to actor Eli Wallach.

== See also ==
- List of Major League Baseball career home run leaders
- List of Major League Baseball career hits leaders
- List of Major League Baseball career doubles leaders
- List of Major League Baseball career runs batted in leaders
- List of Major League Baseball annual doubles leaders
- List of Major League Baseball players with a home run in their first major league at bat
- List of second-generation Major League Baseball players

Awards and achievements
Preceded by Dale Murphy	National League Player of the Month; May, 1982	Succeeded by Al Oliver
Sporting positions
Preceded by George Hendrick	Los Angeles Dodgers hitting coach 2004-2005	Succeeded by Eddie Murray
Preceded by Larry Bowa	Los Angeles Dodgers third base coach 2011-2013	Succeeded by Lorenzo Bundy
Preceded by Trey Hillman	Los Angeles Dodgers bench coach 2014-2015	Succeeded by Bob Geren
Preceded by Mike Goff	Miami Marlins bench coach 2016-2019	Succeeded by James Rowson
