= Víctor Mesa Jr. =

Cuban-American baseball player (born 2001)

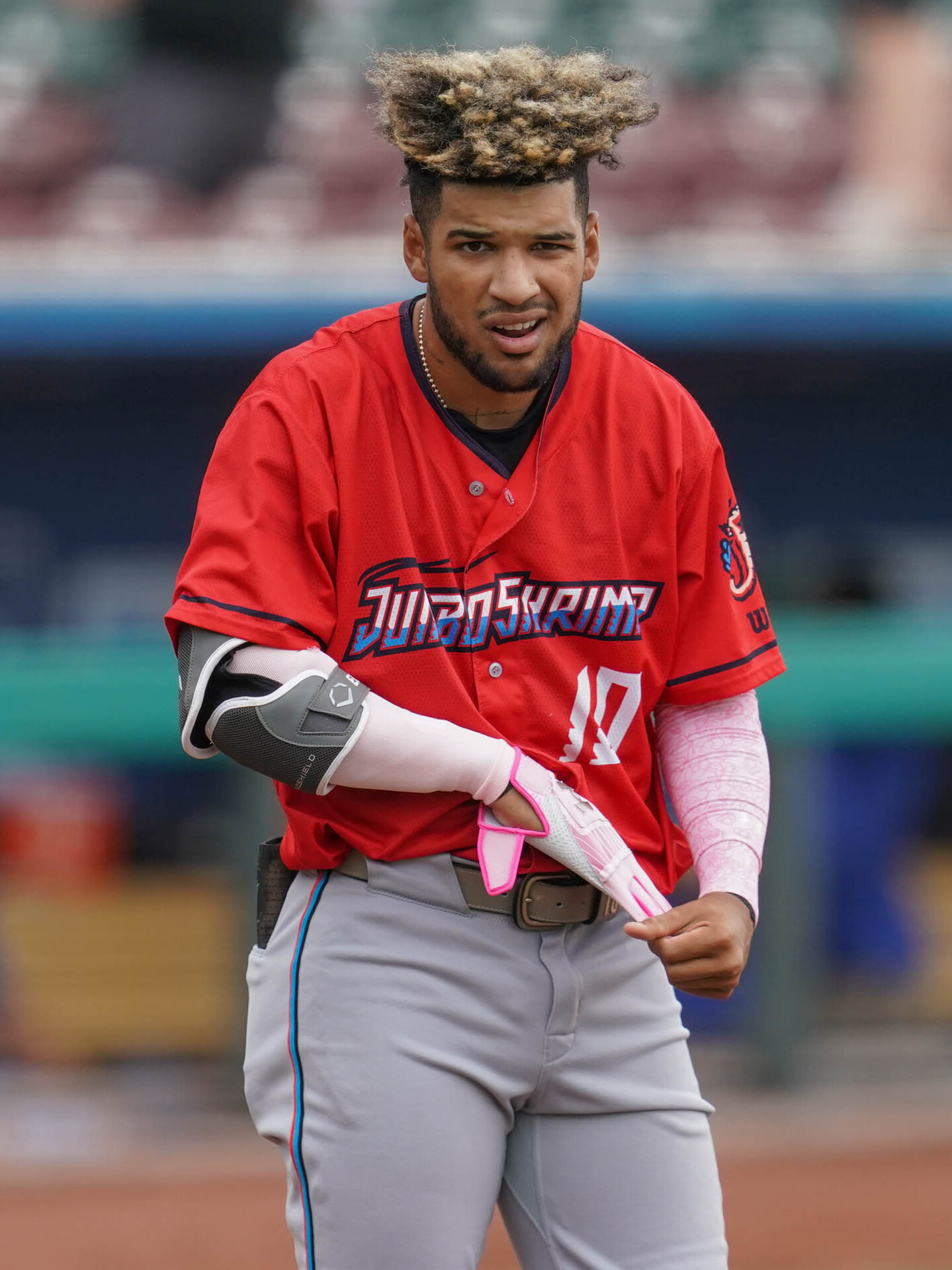
- Mesa with the Jacksonville Jumbo Shrimp in 2024

Tampa Bay Rays – No. 25
- Outfielder
- Born: September 8, 2001 (age 25); Havana, Cuba
- Bats: Left Throws: Left

MLB debut
- May 26, 2025, for the Miami Marlins

MLB statistics (through 2026 season)
- Batting average: .251
- Home runs: 15
- Runs batted in: 40
- Stats at Baseball Reference

Teams
- Miami Marlins (2025); Tampa Bay Rays (2026–present)
Medals
Men's baseball
Representing Cuba
U-15 Baseball World Cup
Gold medal – first place	2016 Iwaki	Team

Víctor Mesa Jr. (born September 8, 2001) is a Cuban-American professional baseball outfielder for the Tampa Bay Rays of Major League Baseball (MLB). He has previously played in MLB for the Miami Marlins.

== Early life ==
Mesa is the son of Víctor Mesa, a longtime player and manager in the Cuban National Series, and the younger brother of Víctor Víctor Mesa. He played for the Cuba national under-18 baseball team. Mesa and his brother defected from Cuba in 2018.

== Career ==
=== Miami Marlins ===
After they were declared free agents, both Mesa brothers signed with the Marlins on October 22, 2018. Mesa received a $1 million signing bonus.

Mesa made his professional debut in 2019 with the Gulf Coast League Marlins, batting .284/.366/.398 with one home run, 24 runs batted in (RBI), and seven stolen bases over 47 games played. Mesa did not play in a game in 2020 due to the cancellation of the minor league season because of the COVID-19 pandemic. In 2021, for the Single-A Jupiter Hammerheads, Mesa batted .266/.317/.402 with five home runs, 71 RBI, and 12 stolen bases in 112 games. In 2022, he played in 121 games for the High-A Beloit Snappers, batting .244/.323/.346 with five home runs, 50 RBI, and 10 stolen bases.

On April 18, 2023, while playing for the Double-A Pensacola Blue Wahoos, Mesa hit for the cycle in a game against the Birmingham Barons. In 123 games for Pensacola, he batted .242/.308/.412 with career-highs in home runs (18), RBI (76), and stolen bases (16).

On November 14, 2023, the Marlins added Mesa to their 40-man roster to protect him from the Rule 5 draft. He was optioned to the Triple-A Jacksonville Jumbo Shrimp to begin the 2024 season. In 83 appearances split between Jupiter and Jacksonville, Mesa slashed .255/.318/.423 with 13 home runs, 51 RBI, and five stolen bases.

The Marlins optioned to Triple-A Jacksonville to begin the 2025 season. On May 26, 2025, Mesa was promoted to the major leagues for the first time. He made his major league debut that day and recorded his first hit the next day. On September 8, his 24th birthday, Mesa hit his first career home run off of Shinnosuke Ogasawara of the Washington Nationals. In 16 appearances for Miami during his rookie campaign, Mesa batted .188/.297/.344 with one home run and six RBI.

On February 3, 2026, Mesa was designated for assignment by the Marlins.

=== Tampa Bay Rays ===
Mesa in Game 2 of the 2026 World Series

On February 6, 2026, the Marlins traded Mesa to the Tampa Bay Rays in exchange for Angel Brachi. He was optioned to the Triple-A Durham Bulls to begin the regular season. The Rays promoted him to the major leagues on May 24 following an injury to Jonny DeLuca. On July 19, he hit an inside–the–park home run off of Sonny Gray of the Boston Red Sox. Mesa was named the American League Player of the Week for the week ending September 12, after he had a .636 on-base percentage. During the 3rd and final game of the American League Divisional Series against the New York Yankees, Mesa hit his first home run in the postseason, a go-ahead two-run home run off Max Fried of the Yankees which became the deciding runs and allowed the Rays to advance to the 2026 ALCS.

In Game 1 of the 2026 World Series, Mesa had a miscue on a base-stealing attempt in the fifth inning, leading to an out in an eventual 3–2 loss. He started the first three games of the Series before being benched for Games 4 and 5 due to pitching matchups. The Rays subsequently lost the Series to the Milwaukee Brewers in five games. Mesa made appearances in all five games, recording two hits and two walks, with three strikeouts over twelve plate appearances.

== Personal life ==
Mesa became a United States citizen in February 2024.
