= Baseball at the 1982 Central American and Caribbean Games =

- Venue: Estadio Latinoamericano
- Dates: 8 – 16 August 1982
- Nations: 7
- Teams: 7

Medalists
gold medal	Dominican Republic
silver medal	Cuba
bronze medal	Netherlands Antilles; Panama

Baseball was contested at the 1982 Central American and Caribbean Games in Havana, Cuba from 8 to 16 August 1982. All of the games were played at the Estadio Latinoamericano.

The tournament was contested by seven national teams in a round robin format. Dominican Republic finished first with a 5–1 record, winning the gold medal. Hosts Cuba finished second with a 4–2 record, winning the silver medal. Both Netherlands Antilles and Panama finished third with a 3–3 record and were awarded the bronze medal.

== Participating nations ==
A total of seven countries participated.

- Cuba
- Dominican Republic
- Netherlands Antilles
- Nicaragua
- Panama
- Puerto Rico
- Venezuela

== Venue ==
Havana, Cuba	Baseball at the 1982 Central American and Caribbean Games is located in Cuba
Estadio Latinoamericano	Baseball at the 1982 Central American and Caribbean Games is located in Cuba

== Medalists ==
Event	Gold	Silver	Bronze
Men's baseball	Dominican Republic (DOM); Miguel Adame; José Cabrejas; Iván Crispín; Enrique Cruz; Marino Cruz; Julio Domínguez; Félix Fermín; Wilfredo Fernández; Ángel Franco; Junior Gelbal; Pedro Gómez; Beato López; Orlando Guerrero; Mario Marte; Ulises Martínez; Víctor Mercedes; Jony Olivo; Juan Ortiz; Ramón Peña; Juan Rivas	Cuba (CUB); Agustín Arias; Juan Baró; Juan Castro; Lázaro de la Torre; Octavio Gálvez; Giraldo González; Lourdes Gourriel; Fernando Hernández; Wilfredo Hernández; Alfonso Ilivanes; Pedro Jova; Lázaro Junco; Pedro Medina; Víctor Mesa; Antonio Muñoz; Félix Pino; Pedro Rodríguez; Fernando Sánchez; Jorge Luis Valdés; Braudilio Vinent	Netherlands Antilles (AHO); Renato Amastagasti; Robby Arambatzis; Marlon Balentin; Sherwin Cijntje; Eithel de Caster; Philip Elmage; Regino Irausquin; Rafael Jozefa; Adelbert Kelboom; Gerrit Kruithof; Marlon Louisa; Nelson Orman; Rudsel Paulina; Rudson Roberto; Carlos Rudolph; Perry Sprock; Ramses Sprock; Ronald Stewart; Félix Thiel; Robert Tromp
Men's baseball	Dominican Republic (DOM); Miguel Adame; José Cabrejas; Iván Crispín; Enrique Cruz; Marino Cruz; Julio Domínguez; Félix Fermín; Wilfredo Fernández; Ángel Franco; Junior Gelbal; Pedro Gómez; Beato López; Orlando Guerrero; Mario Marte; Ulises Martínez; Víctor Mercedes; Jony Olivo; Juan Ortiz; Ramón Peña; Juan Rivas	Cuba (CUB); Agustín Arias; Juan Baró; Juan Castro; Lázaro de la Torre; Octavio Gálvez; Giraldo González; Lourdes Gourriel; Fernando Hernández; Wilfredo Hernández; Alfonso Ilivanes; Pedro Jova; Lázaro Junco; Pedro Medina; Víctor Mesa; Antonio Muñoz; Félix Pino; Pedro Rodríguez; Fernando Sánchez; Jorge Luis Valdés; Braudilio Vinent	Panama (PAN); Orlando Cano; Franklyn Castillo; Johny Córdova; Azael Domínguez; Tito Espino; Vicente Foster; Rodrigo Luque; Víctor Mendoza; Porfirio Monroy; Ronaldo Montero; Luis Muñoz; Julio Murillo; Franklyn Pérez; Crispín Poveda; Rodrigo Orozco; Benjamín Salamín; Enrique Serracín; Pablo Vigil; Rigoberto Weeks

== Round robin ==
Pos	Team	Pld	W	L	RF	RA	RD	PCT	GB
1	Dominican Republic	6	5	1	22	16	+6	.833	—
2	Cuba (H)	6	4	2	32	12	+20	.667	1
3	Netherlands Antilles	6	3	3	19	28	−9	.500	2
4	Panama	6	3	3	15	17	−2	.500	2
5	Venezuela	6	2	4	27	30	−3	.333	3
6	Nicaragua	6	2	4	19	24	−5	.333	3
7	Puerto Rico	6	2	4	24	31	−7	.333	3

Source: Centro Caribe Sports
(H) Hosts

=== Results ===
8 August 1982	Venezuela	5 – 6	Netherlands Antilles	Estadio Latinoamericano, Havana

8 August 1982	Nicaragua	4 – 10	Puerto Rico	Estadio Latinoamericano, Havana

8 August 1982	Panama	2 – 1	Cuba	Estadio Latinoamericano, Havana

9 August 1982	Nicaragua	6 – 0	Venezuela	Estadio Latinoamericano, Havana

9 August 1982	Puerto Rico	7 – 8	Netherlands Antilles	Estadio Latinoamericano, Havana

9 August 1982	Panama	3 – 6	Dominican Republic	Estadio Latinoamericano, Havana

11 August 1982	Puerto Rico	0 – 5	Panama	Estadio Latinoamericano, Havana

11 August 1982	Dominican Republic	5 – 3	Nicaragua	Estadio Latinoamericano, Havana

11 August 1982	Cuba	10 – 0	Netherlands Antilles	Estadio Latinoamericano, Havana

12 August 1982	Netherlands Antilles	1 – 3	Dominican Republic	Estadio Latinoamericano, Havana

12 August 1982	Panama	0 – 4	Venezuela	Estadio Latinoamericano, Havana

12 August 1982	Cuba	5 – 2	Nicaragua	Estadio Latinoamericano, Havana

14 August 1982	Netherlands Antilles	2 – 0	Nicaragua	Estadio Latinoamericano, Havana

14 August 1982	Dominican Republic	2 – 1	Puerto Rico	Estadio Latinoamericano, Havana

14 August 1982	Venezuela	4 – 10	Cuba	Estadio Latinoamericano, Havana

15 August 1982	Netherlands Antilles	2 – 3	Panama	Estadio Latinoamericano, Havana

15 August 1982	Dominican Republic	5 – 4	Venezuela	Estadio Latinoamericano, Havana

15 August 1982	Puerto Rico	3 – 2	Cuba	Estadio Latinoamericano, Havana

16 August 1982	Nicaragua	4 – 2	Panama	Estadio Latinoamericano, Havana

16 August 1982	Venezuela	10 – 3	Puerto Rico	Estadio Latinoamericano, Havana

16 August 1982	Cuba	4 – 1	Dominican Republic	Estadio Latinoamericano, Havana

== Statistical leaders ==
=== Batting ===
Statistic	Player	Total
Batting average	(Venezuela) Jesús Cartagena	.524
Hits	(Venezuela) Jesús Cartagena	11
Runs	(Venezuela) Henry Valbuena	6
Runs	(Cuba) Antonio Muñoz	6
Home runs	(Cuba) Pedro Rodríguez	2
Home runs	(Puerto Rico) Rubén Machado	2
Home runs	(Nicaragua) Apolinar Cruz	2
Stolen bases	(Dominican Republic) Orlando Guerrero	5

=== Pitching ===
Statistic	Name	Total
Wins	5 tied with (Note: Orlando Torres, Braudilio Vinent, Lázaro de la Torre, Mariano Quiñones. Jony Olivo)	2
Losses	(Venezuela) Evelio Ovalles	3
Innings pitched	(Venezuela) Orlando Torres	16.0
Innings pitched	(Puerto Rico) Mariano Quiñones	16.0
Earned runs allowed	(Cuba) Lázaro de la Torre	0.00
Strikeouts	(Nicaragua) Roger López	13
