= Víctor Víctor Mesa =

Cuban baseball player (born 1996)

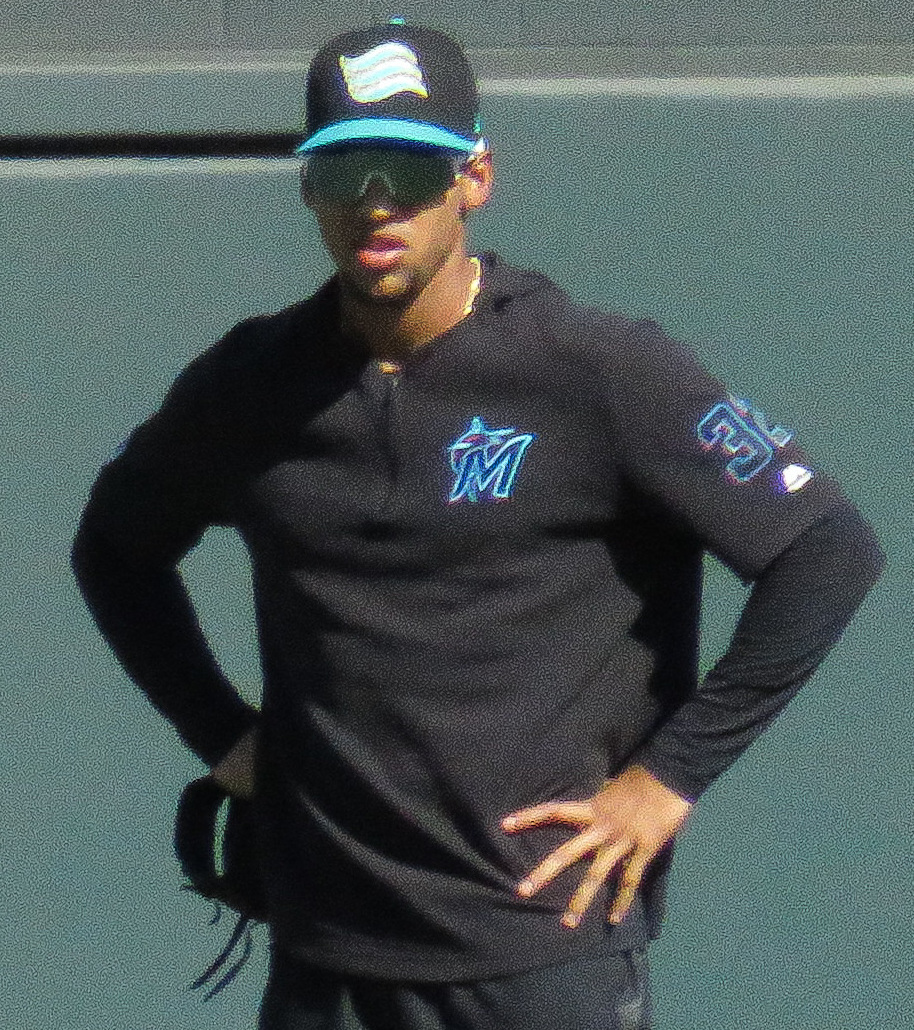
- Mesa in the Arizona Fall League in 2019

Miami Marlins
- Outfielder
- Born: July 20, 1996 (age 30); Santa Clara, Cuba
- Bats: Right Throws: Right
- Stats at Baseball Reference
Medals
Men's baseball
Representing Cuba
18U Baseball World Cup
Bronze medal – third place	2013 Taichung	Team

Víctor Víctor Mesa Ríos (born July 20, 1996) is a Cuban professional baseball outfielder in the Miami Marlins organization.

== Career ==
Mesa played in the Cuban National Series for Matanzas from 2012 through 2017, and for Industriales in the 2017–18 season. Mesa played for the Cuban national team at the 2017 World Baseball Classic. Mesa and his younger brother, Víctor Mesa Jr., defected from Cuba in 2018.

On October 22, 2018, Mesa and his brother Víctor Jr. signed with the Miami Marlins. Mesa received a $5.25 million signing bonus. He began 2019 with the Jupiter Hammerheads, and was promoted to the Jacksonville Jumbo Shrimp on July 30. Between the two levels, Mesa hit a combined .235/.274/.263 with no home runs and 29 runs batted in. Following the 2019 season Mesa played for the Salt River Rafters of the Arizona Fall League. Mesa did not play in a game in 2020 due to the cancellation of the minor league season because of the COVID-19 pandemic.

Mesa returned to action in 2021, playing in 72 games split between the High-A Beloit Snappers and Double-A Pensacola Blue Wahoos. On the year, he batted .249/.321/.345 with 4 home runs, 27 RBI, and 11 stolen bases. Mesa began the 2022 season with Pensacola, and was promoted to the Triple-A Jacksonville Jumbo Shrimp in August after hitting .228/.295/.296 with 2 home runs, 22 RBI, and 26 stolen bases in 54 games.

Mesa began the 2023 season with Double–A Pensacola, but was promoted to Triple–A Jacksonville after one game. In 12 games for the Jumbo Shrimp, he hit .206/.270/.294 with one home run, five RBI, and two stolen bases. On July 10, 2023, it was reported that Mesa had left the team prior to a series against the Gwinnett Stripers, following a disagreement with the coaching staff. His last appearance had come on June 16. He was not expected to report to minor league spring training in 2024 according to reporting in the Miami Herald.

As of 2026, Mesa had not been officially released by the Marlins per his profile on MLB.com, nor had he recorded any professional stats since 2023, thereby leaving his roster status uncertain.

== Personal life ==
His father, Víctor Mesa, was the manager of Cuba at the 2013 World Baseball Classic and is a former player. His brother Víctor Mesa Jr. is also a professional outfielder.
