= Iwaki Green Stadium =

Stadium in Iwaki, Fukushima, Japan

Coordinates: 37°01′05″N 140°51′38″E

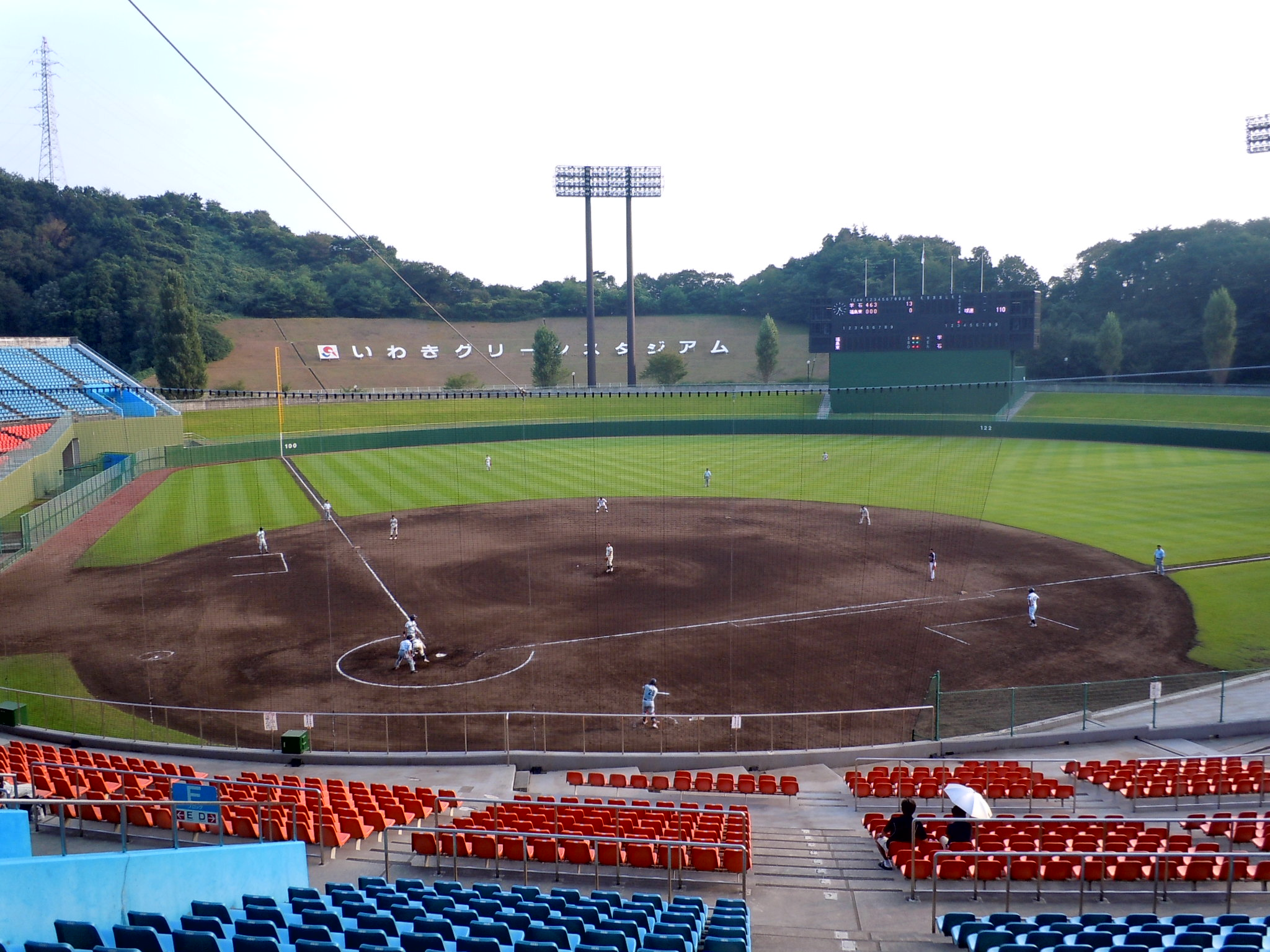
- Interactive map of Iwaki Green Stadium
- Location: Iwaki, Fukushima, Japan
- Owner: Iwaki City
- Operator: Iwaki City
- Capacity: 30,000
- Field size: Left Field - 100m Center Field - 122m Right Field – 100m

Construction
- Opened: April 1995

Iwaki Green Stadium (いわきグリーンスタジアム, Iwaki Guriin Sutajiamu) is a stadium in Iwaki, Fukushima, Japan. It opened in 1995 and has a seating capacity of 30,000 people. Its design was based on that of Chiba Marine Stadium, and it is primarily used as a baseball venue. The stadium hosts various baseball and softball events, including those for high schools, universities and amateur leagues, and one-two professional baseball games per year and was the venue for the NPB All-Star Game in 2013.
