= 1986 Amateur World Series =

Tournament details
- Country: Netherlands
- Teams: 12
- Defending champions: Cuba

Final positions
- Champions: Cuba (17th title)
- Runners-up: South Korea
- Third place: Chinese Taipei
- Fourth place: United States

The 1986 Amateur World Series was the 29th Amateur World Series (AWS), an international men's amateur baseball tournament. The tournament was sanctioned by the International Baseball Federation (IBAF). The tournament took place for the first time in the Netherlands, from July 19 to August 2, and was won by Cuba – its 18th AWS victory.

There were 12 participating countries.

This was the last time the IBAF titled it as the AWS; the next ten competitions were held under the name Baseball World Cup, then was replaced in 2015 by the quadrennial WBSC Premier12.

== Final standings ==
| Pos | Team | W | L |
|---|---|---|---|
| Gold medal | Cuba | 10 | 1 |
| Silver medal | South Korea | 8 | 3 |
| Bronze medal | Chinese Taipei | 8 | 3 |
| 4 | United States | 7 | 4 |
| 5 | Japan | 6 | 5 |
| 6 | Italy | 6 | 5 |
| 7 | Venezuela | 5 | 6 |
| 8 | Puerto Rico | 5 | 6 |
| 9 | Netherlands | 5 | 6 |
| 10 | Colombia | 3 | 8 |
| 11 | Netherlands Antilles | 2 | 9 |
| 12 | Belgium | 1 | 10 |

== Honors and awards ==
=== Statistical leaders ===
Batting leaders
| Statistic | Name | Total |
|---|---|---|
| Batting average | (Italy) Giuseppe Carelli | .478 |
| Hits | (Italy) Giuseppe Carelli | 22 |
| Runs | (Italy) Roberto Bianchi | 18 |
| Home runs | (Cuba) Luis Casanova | 6 |
| Runs batted in | (Cuba) Luis Casanova | |
| Stolen bases | (Puerto Rico) Roberto Santana | 6 |

Pitching leaders
| Statistic | Name | Total |
|---|---|---|
| Wins | (South Korea) Park Dong-hee | 3 |
| Earned run average | (Chinese Taipei) Ming-Shan Kang | 0.35 |

=== All-Star team ===
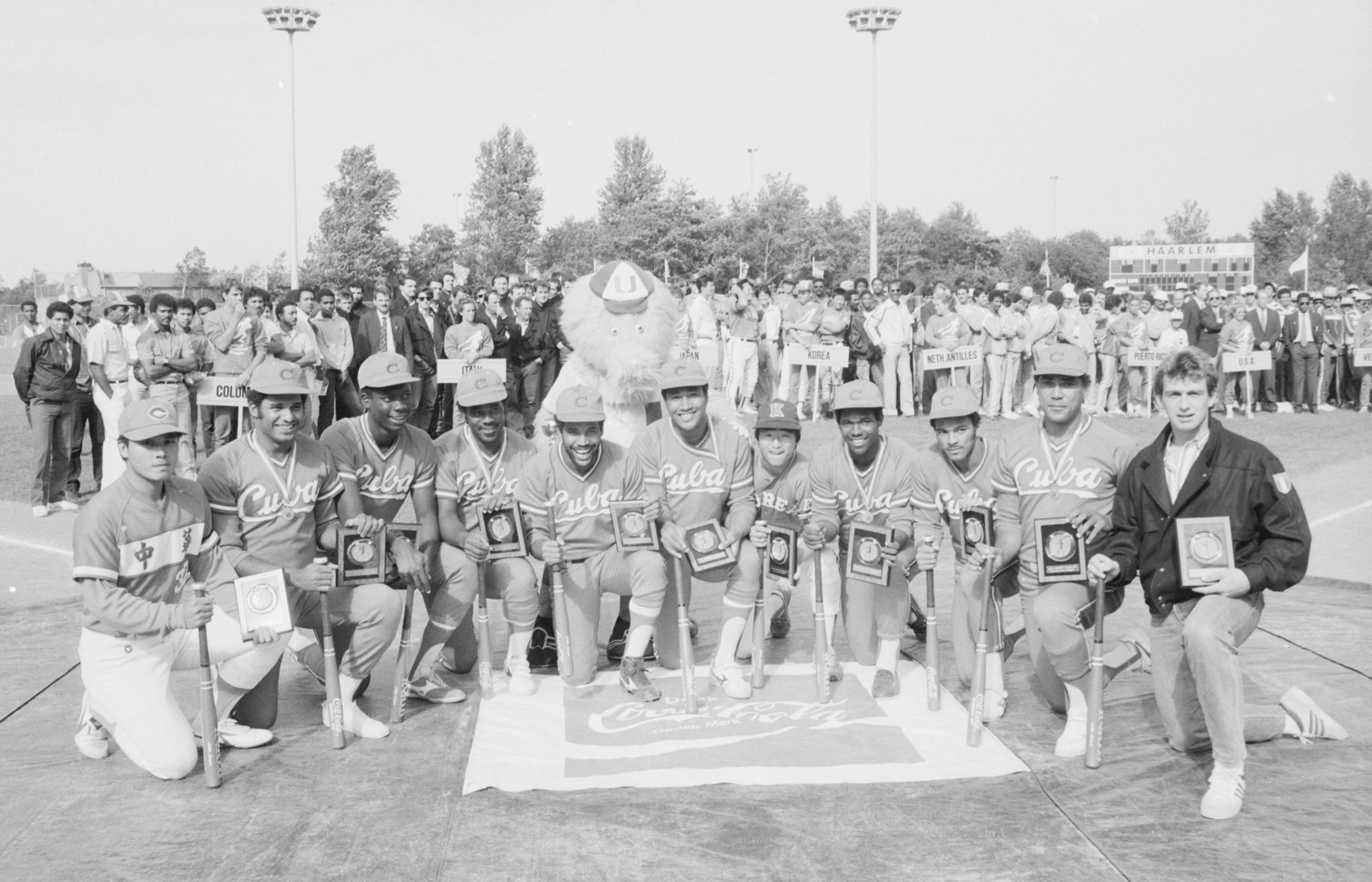
The 1986 all-star team, from left to right: Kang, Kindelan, Abreu, Casanova, Mesa, Gourriel, Ryu, Linares, Pacheco, Muñoz, Bianchi

| Position | Player |
|---|---|
| C | (Italy) Roberto Bianchi |
| 1B | (Cuba) Antonio Muñoz |
| 2B | (Cuba) Antonio Pacheco |
| 3B | (Cuba) Omar Linares |
| SS | (South Korea) Chung-il Ryu |
| OF | (Cuba) Lourdes Gourriel |
| OF | (Cuba) Víctor Mesa |
| OF | (Cuba) Luis Casanova |
| DH | (Cuba) Orestes Kindelán |
| P | (Cuba) Pablo Abreu (LHP) |
| P | (Chinese Taipei) Ming-Shan Kang (RHP) |
