= Baseball at the 1986 Central American and Caribbean Games =

Baseball was contested at the 1986 Central American and Caribbean Games in Santiago de los Caballeros, Dominican Republic.

| Event | Gold | Silver | Bronze |
|---|---|---|---|
| Men's baseball | Cuba (CUB) | Netherlands Antilles (AHO) | Venezuela (VEN) |
