= 1980 Amateur World Series =

US amateur baseball tournament

Tournament details
- Country: Japan
- Teams: 12
- Defending champions: Cuba

Final positions
- Champions: Cuba (15th title)
- Runners-up: South Korea
- Third place: Japan
- Fourth place: United States

The 1980 Amateur World Series was the 26th Amateur World Series (AWS), an international men's amateur baseball tournament. The tournament was sanctioned by the International Baseball Federation (which titled it the Baseball World Cup as of the 1988 tournament). The tournament took place in Japan, the first time outside the Americas or Europe, from August 22 to September 5, and was won by Cuba – its 16th AWS victory.

There were 12 participating countries.

== Standings ==
Pos	Team	P	W	L
1	Cuba	11	11	0
2	South Korea	11	9	2
3	Japan	11	9	2
4	United States	11	8	3
5	Canada	11	6	5
6	Italy	11	5	6
7	Venezuela	11	4	7
8	Puerto Rico	11	4	7
9	Colombia	11	4	7
10	Australia	11	4	7
11	Mexico	11	1	10
12	Netherlands	11	1	10
