= 1984 Amateur World Series =

Tournament details
- Country: Cuba
- Teams: 13
- Defending champions: Cuba

Final positions
- Champions: Cuba (16th title)
- Runners-up: Chinese Taipei
- Third place: United States
- Fourth place: Japan

Awards
- MVP: (Cuba) Víctor Mesa

The 1984 Amateur World Series was the 28th Amateur World Series (AWS), an international men's amateur baseball tournament. The tournament was sanctioned by the International Baseball Federation (which titled it the Baseball World Cup as of the 1988 tournament). The tournament took place, for the ninth time, in Cuba, from October 14 to 28, and was won by host Cuba – its 17th AWS victory.

There were 13 participating countries, including first-time participant Netherlands Antilles.

Víctor Mesa was named the Series MVP.

== Standings ==
Pos	Team
	Cuba
	Chinese Taipei
	United States
4	Japan
5	South Korea
6	Panama
7	Nicaragua
8	Puerto Rico
9	Venezuela
10	Netherlands Antilles
11	Italy
12	Dominican Republic
13	Netherlands
