= 1988 Baseball World Cup =

Tournament details
- Country: Italy
- Dates: 23 August – 7 September
- Teams: 12

Final positions
- Champions: Cuba (19th title)
- Runners-up: United States
- Third place: Chinese Taipei
- Fourth place: Japan

Tournament statistics
- Games played: 70

The 1988 Baseball World Cup (BWC) was the 30th international Men's amateur baseball tournament. The tournament was sanctioned by the International Baseball Federation, which titled it the Amateur World Series from the 1938 tournament through the 1986 AWS. The tournament took place, for the second time, in Italy, from August 23 to September 7, and was won by Cuba – its 19th overall victory (their first under the BWC name).

There were 12 participating countries.

The next nine competitions were also held as the BWC tournament, then was replaced in 2015 by the quadrennial WBSC Premier12.

== First round ==
=== Standings ===
Pos	Team	W	L	RS	RA
1	Cuba	11	0	112	35
2	United States	10	1	120	22
3	Chinese Taipei	8	3	77	32
4	Japan	7	4	65	29
5	Canada	7	4	73	72
6	Puerto Rico	6	5	77	46
7	Nicaragua	5	6	46	61
8	South Korea	5	6	59	47
9	Italy	4	7	51	70
10	Netherlands	2	9	49	93
11	Netherlands Antilles	1	10	44	115
12	Spain	0	11	9	160

== Final round ==
Semifinals
Cuba	7
Japan	3
United States	6
Chinese Taipei	3

Final
Cuba	4
United States	3
Third place
Japan	2
Chinese Taipei	4

== Final standings ==
Pos	Team	W	L
	Cuba	13	0
	United States	11	2
	Chinese Taipei	9	4
4	Japan	7	6
5	Canada	7	4
6	Puerto Rico	6	5
7	Nicaragua	5	6
8	South Korea	5	6
9	Italy	4	7
10	Netherlands	2	9
11	Netherlands Antilles	1	10
12	Spain	0	11

== Awards ==
Tournament Awards
Award	Player
Leading hitter	(Cuba) Antonio Pacheco
Pitcher with best ERA	(United States) Ben McDonald
Pitcher with best win/loss average	(Japan) Takehiro Ishii
Most Runs batted in	(United States) Robin Ventura
Most Home runs	(Cuba) Luis Casanova
Most Stolen bases	(Nicaragua) Julio Medina
Most Stolen bases	(Japan) Kenji Tomashino
Most Runs scored	(United States) Ty Griffin
Most Runs scored	(Cuba) Omar Linares

All Star Team
Position	Player
Pitchers	(Japan) Takehiro Ishii
Pitchers	(United States) Jim Abbott
Catcher	(Cuba) Pedro Rodríguez
First base	(United States) Tino Martinez
Second base	(Cuba) Antonio Pacheco
Third base	(United States) Robin Ventura
Shortstop	(Canada) Matt Stairs
Outfield	(Cuba) Luis Casanova
Outfield	(Cuba) Lourdes Gourriel
Outfield	(Japan) Daisuke Tsutsui
Designated hitter	(United States) Mike Fiore
