= Mainieri =

Mainieri is a surname. Notable people with the surname include:

- Demie Mainieri (1928–2019), American football coach
- Mike Mainieri (born 1938), American jazz musician
- Paul Mainieri (born 1957), American baseball player and coach
