= Jaime Bubela =

American baseball player (born 1978)

- Outfielder
- Born: June 6, 1978 (age 48); Houston, Texas, U.S.
- Batted: Left Threw: Right

MLB debut
- September 15, 2005, for the Seattle Mariners

Last MLB appearance
- October 2, 2005, for the Seattle Mariners

MLB statistics
- Batting average: .105
- Home runs: 0
- Runs batted in: 0
- Stats at Baseball Reference

Teams
- Seattle Mariners (2005)

Jaime Lee Bubela (born June 6, 1978) is an American former Major League Baseball outfielder who played in 11 games for the Seattle Mariners in 2005.

Bubela attended Cypress Falls High School in Houston, Texas. He began college at Blinn College, then transferred to Baylor University. In 1999, he played collegiate summer baseball with the Wareham Gatemen of the Cape Cod Baseball League, where he was named a league all-star and won the league's Thurman Munson Award for leading all hitters with a .370 batting average. He was named to the first-team All-Big 12 team in 2000 with the Baylor Bears.

Bubela was drafted in the 7th round of the 2000 Major League Baseball draft by the Seattle Mariners. In 2005, he batted .292 and stole 40 bases for Double-A San Antonio. This earned him a September call-up to the Mariners. He made his major league debut on September 15 and he had his first MLB hit on September 29. Mariners trainer Rick Griffin and veterans Dan Wilson and Jamie Moyer pranked Bubela after the hit, presenting him with a ball with incorrect information that they said was the ball from his first hit. After a second hit on October 1, Bubela played in his final major league game on October 2. He did not play professionally after that season.
