= Brian McNichol =

American baseball player (born 1974)

- Pitcher
- Born: May 20, 1974 (age 51); Fairfax, Virginia, U.S.
- Batted: Left Threw: Left

MLB debut
- September 7, 1999, for the Chicago Cubs

Last MLB appearance
- September 30, 1999, for the Chicago Cubs

MLB statistics
- Win–loss record: 0–2
- Earned run average: 6.75
- Strikeouts: 12
- Stats at Baseball Reference

Teams
- Chicago Cubs (1999)

Brian David McNichol (born May 20, 1974) is an American former professional baseball pitcher. McNichol played for the Chicago Cubs of Major League Baseball (MLB) in 1999.

McNichol played collegiate baseball for James Madison University, where he compiled an 18–7 win-loss record between 1993 and 1995. In 1994, he played collegiate summer baseball with the Wareham Gatemen of the Cape Cod Baseball League.
