= Ian Bedell =

American baseball player (born 1999)

Free agent
- Pitcher
- Born: September 5, 1999 (age 26); Davenport, Iowa, U.S.
- Bats: Right Throws: Right
- Stats at Baseball Reference

Ian McAllister Bedell (born September 5, 1999) is an American professional baseball pitcher who is a free agent.

== Amateur career ==
Bedell attended Central High School in Davenport, Iowa, where he played baseball. As a sophomore in 2016, he went 7–1 with a 1.70 ERA over 53 2/3 innings. After reclassifying and graduating early, he enrolled at the University of Missouri to play college baseball.

As a freshman at Missouri in 2018, Bedell pitched to a 6.17 ERA over 11 2/3 innings. As a sophomore in 2019, he made 18 appearances and went 3–1 with a 1.56 ERA and 36 strikeouts over 40 1/3 innings. That summer, he played in the Cape Cod Baseball League for the Wareham Gatemen where he was 4–0 with a 0.59 ERA over 30 2/3 innings, was named a league All-Star, and won the league's Outstanding Pitcher award. Bedell moved into the starting rotation for the 2020 season, starting four games and pitching to a 3.70 ERA before the season was cancelled due to the COVID-19 pandemic.

== Professional career ==
Bedell was selected by the St. Louis Cardinals in the fourth round with the 122nd overall pick of the shortened 2020 Major League Baseball draft. He signed for $800,000. Bedell did not appear for the organization during the regular season as a result of the cancellation of the minor league season due to the COVID-19 pandemic.

Bedell made his professional debut in the 2021 with the Peoria Chiefs. He pitched 2 2/3 innings before undergoing Tommy John surgery. Bedell returned to play in August 2022 and spent the season rehabbing with the Florida Complex League Cardinals and Palm Beach Cardinals, totaling a 3.18 ERA over 5 2/3 innings. Bedell returned to Peoria for the 2023 season. Over 27 games (19 starts), he went 4–2 with a 2.44 ERA and 106 strikeouts over 96 innings and was named the Midwest League Pitcher of the Year. Bedell was assigned to the Springfield Cardinals to open the 2024 season. In mid-June, he was promoted to the Memphis Redbirds. Over 21 games (19 starts) between both affiliates, Bedell posted a 3-4 record and 4.85 ERA. Bedell returned to Memphis to open the 2025 season and spent time on the injured list during the season. Bedell started 14 games for Memphis and went 0-5 with a 7.96 ERA over 52 innings.

Bedell made 11 appearances (including one start) for Memphis in 2026, but struggled to an 11.78 ERA with 19 strikeouts and one save across 18 1/3 innings pitched. He was released by the Cardinals organization on July 22, 2026.
