= Bryant Packard =

American baseball player (born 1997)

- Outfielder
- Born: October 6, 1997 (age 28); Seattle, Washington, U.S.
- Bats: Left Throws: Right

Bryant Thomas Packard (born October 6, 1997) is an American former baseball outfielder. He was a consensus All-American in 2018. He was later in the Detroit Tigers organization.

== Biography ==
Packard attended East Carolina University from 2017 to 2019. After featuring in a supporting role as a freshman, he had a breakout sophomore year batting .406 with a .462 OBP. He hit 14 home runs with 50 RBIs and was named to seven All-American teams, including five as a first-team selection. He was the AAC Conference Player of the Year and a unanimous selection to the All-AAC First Team. He was named on the preseason Golden Spikes Award watchlist entering his junior year. He would hit .358 as a junior with a .444 OBP, aided by walking nine times more as a junior than a sophomore. He would hit seven home runs, a career-high 19 doubles, and finished with 40 RBIs. In 2018, he played collegiate summer baseball with the Wareham Gatemen of the Cape Cod Baseball League, where he was named a league all-star.

Packard was taken in the fifth round of the 2019 MLB Draft. He would start his career in the Detroit Tigers system with A-Short Season Connecticut Tigers. Over 11 games, he would hit .351 with a .432 OBP, walking six times compared to just nine strikeouts. He would then join the Single-A West Michigan Whitecaps where he would continue his ascent. After hitting .309 with a .404 OBP, along with three home runs and 12 RBIs, in 23 games, he would end his 2019 season with the A-Advanced Lakeland Flying Tigers. Packard spent five games with Lakeland ending with a pair of hits and a pair of RBIs. Ahead of the 2020 season, which was set to be his first full professional campaign, he was named the Tigers' #17 prospect according to MLB.com He did not play a minor league game in 2020 due to the cancellation of the minor league season caused by the COVID-19 pandemic. He was released on July 21, 2023.
