= Phil Devey =

Canadian former baseball pitcher

- Pitcher
- Born: May 31, 1977 (age 48); St. Jerome, Quebec, Canada
- Bats: Left Throws: Left
- Stats at Baseball Reference

Phil Devey (born May 31, 1977) is a Canadian former professional baseball pitcher who played internationally for Team Canada in the 2004 Summer Olympics.

== Amateur career ==
Devey graduated from the University of Louisiana at Lafayette (then known as the University of Southwestern Louisiana). In 1998, he played collegiate summer baseball with the Wareham Gatemen of the Cape Cod Baseball League, where he was named a league all-star and received the league's Outstanding Pitcher award.

== Professional career ==
Devey was selected in the 5th round of the 1999 MLB draft by the Los Angeles Dodgers, and played in the Dodgers system at Yakima, San Bernardino, Vero Beach, Jacksonville and Las Vegas from 1999 to 2003.

Devey played with San Antonio of the Texas League in 2004, the AA affiliate of the Seattle Mariners, then in 2005 with both the Portland Sea Dogs, the AA affiliate of the Boston Red Sox, and the AA affiliate of the Philadelphia Phillies, the Reading Phillies, both of the Eastern League.

== International career ==
Devey was a member of Team Canada in the 2004 Summer Olympics. The team finished in fourth place, and Devey pitched six scoreless innings against Australia in an 11-0 round-robin win.
