= Matt Rogelstad =

- Infielder
- Born: September 13, 1982 (age 44); New Westminster, British Columbia, Canada
- Bats: Left Throws: Right
- Stats at Baseball Reference

Matt Rogelstad OLY (born September 13, 1982) is a Canadian former professional baseball player who played internationally for the Canadian national team at the 2008 Olympics.

== High school and college career ==
A native of New Westminster, British Columbia, Rogelstad played multiple seasons for the Coquitlam Reds of the B.C. Premier Baseball League while in high school. He played for the Canadian National Junior Team at the 1999 and 2000 World Junior Baseball Championships.

Rogelstad went on to play one year of college baseball, where he hit .279 for the Southeastern Louisiana University Lions. After the 2002 season, he played collegiate summer baseball for the Wareham Gatemen of the Cape Cod Baseball League where he was named a league all-star, then transferred to Arkansas State University, where he batted .341 in 2003. His five strikeouts in only 208 at-bats was the lowest rate in NCAA Division I, and earned him the NCAA Statistics Service "Toughest to Strike Out" award.

== Professional career ==
Rogelstad signed as an undrafted free agent with the Seattle Mariners on June 17, 2003.

=== 2005 ===
Rogelstad played for Team Canada at the 2005 Baseball World Cup in the Netherlands.

=== 2006 ===
Rogelstad played for Team Canada at the 2006 World Baseball Classic. He only appearance of the tournament came during the 9th inning of an 11-8 victory against South Africa, where he pinch-ran for Pierre-Luc Laforest.

=== 2007 ===
On March 26, 2007, the Mariners sold his contract to the Washington Nationals. He played the 2007 season for the Class A Advanced Potomac Nationals, where his .302 batting average ranked him third among all Carolina League hitters. After Potomac's season was complete, Rogelstad would go on to represent Canada at the 2007 Baseball World Cup in Taiwan. He was named the Canadian Team MVP after hitting .485 with seven RBI in seven games.

=== 2008 ===
Rogelstad was part of Canada's qualification for a berth at the 2008 Olympics. He hit .360 with 9 runs and 8 RBIs in 7 games while serving as Canada's primary third baseman during the 2008 Olympic Qualification Tournament. His success during Olympic qualifying did not carry over to the Olympic tournament, where he went 2 for 25 with 8 strikeouts.

Rogelstad had a moderately successful 2008 season for the Potomac Nationals, where he hit .272 and had 39 runs batted in. His performance earned him a promotion to the Class AA Harrisburg Senators in early July 2008.

=== 2011 ===
In the winter of 2011, as Rogelstad goes for a degree in accounting at York College of Pennsylvania, he is recruited by the Quick Six (now Falloons) hockey club, which consists of other students from York College. He goes on to help the team to a championship chipping in 9 goals and 15 assists in his 14 games played that season. He even suited up as goalie one game.

In the fall, Falloons hockey is off to a strong season to defend their title. Rogelstad had his best game yet of the season on December 7, netting 4 goals and 2 assists in a 7-6 winning effort over the Lancaster Chiefs.
