= Wareham Gatemen =

Collegiate summer baseball team in Massachusetts

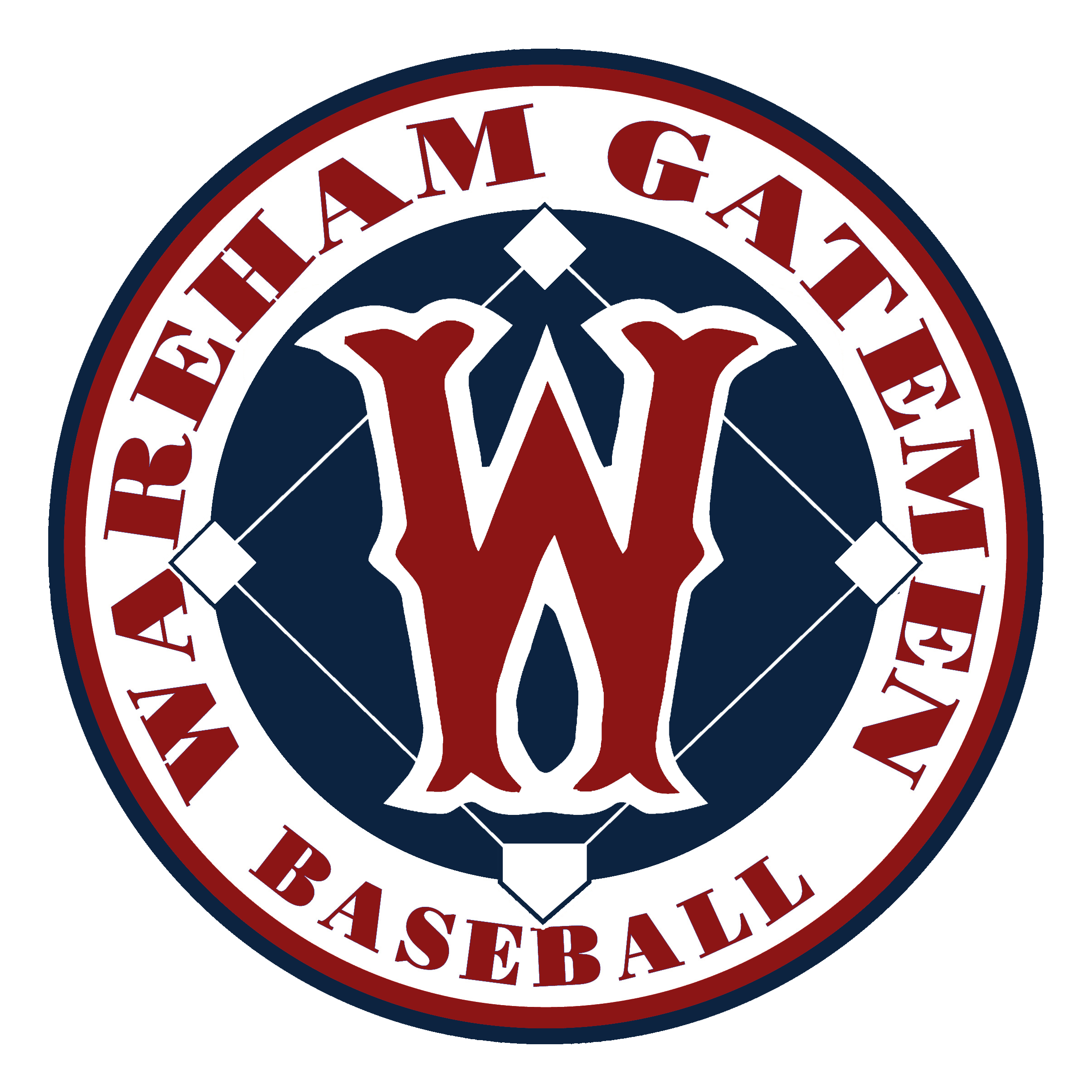
- Logo

Information
- League: Cape Cod Baseball League (West Division)
- Location: Wareham, Massachusetts
- Ballpark: Clem Spillane Field
- League championships: 1930, 1976, 1988, 1994, 1997, 2001, 2002, 2012, 2018
- Colors: Red, Blue
- President: Matt Merrick
- General manager: Jay Spinale
- Manager: Ryan Smyth
- Website: www.capecodleague.com/wareham/

The Wareham Gatemen are a collegiate summer baseball team based in Wareham, Massachusetts. The team is a member of the Cape Cod Baseball League (CCBL) and plays in the league's West Division. The Gatemen play their home games at Clem Spillane Field in Wareham.

The Gatemen most recently won the CCBL championship in 2018 when they defeated the Chatham Anglers two games to none to win the best of three championship series. The title was the eighth in team history, including back-to-back championships in 2001–2002. Since the club's inception, over 100 players have gone on to play in Major League Baseball.

== History ==
=== Pre-modern era ===
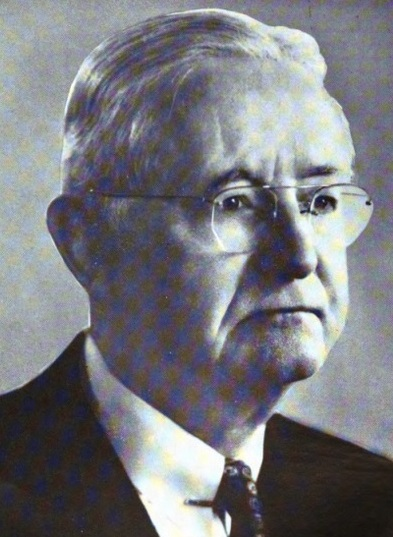
US congressman Charles L. Gifford was on hand to celebrate Wareham's 1930 Cape League champs.

==== The early Cape League era (1923–1939) ====
In 1923, the Cape Cod Baseball League was formed and included four teams: Chatham, Falmouth, Hyannis and Osterville. This early Cape Cod League operated through the 1939 season and disbanded in 1940, due in large part to the difficulty of securing ongoing funding during the Great Depression.

Wareham was the first new team added to the league, joining for the 1927 season to bring the number of teams to five. In Wareham's inaugural 1927 season, the team was led by player-manager and CCBL Hall of Famer Danny Silva. Silva had played briefly for the Washington Senators in 1919, and after his playing days became a longtime umpire in the CCBL. In the early 1960s when a knowledgeable and universally respected figure was needed to unify the newly reorganized Cape League, Silva was chosen and served as the first commissioner of the league's modern era, a position he held from 1962 to 1968. Silva's 1927 Wareham team finished with a respectable 17–18 record, good for third among the five clubs. Wareham was forced to drop out of the league for the 1929 season due to lack of funds, then returned to the league in 1930 and remained in the league through the 1932 season.

Wareham won the Cape League championship in 1930, finishing two games ahead of Chatham to take the pennant. The town celebrated its champions in grand style with a "motor parade" through downtown Wareham led by the town band, followed by a banquet given by the town's chamber of commerce. Dignitaries including United States Representative Charles L. Gifford and Massachusetts Senator Donald W. Nicholson were on hand to pay tribute to the Wareham nine.

Wareham's player-manager in 1930 and 1931 was Georgetown University pitcher Harry Noznesky. Noznesky had played for Falmouth in 1928 and 1929, and brought several key players with him to Wareham from the 1929 pennant-winning Falmouth team, such as ex-Falmouth all-CCBL catcher Gene Connell of the University of Pennsylvania, who went on to catch for the Philadelphia Phillies. Upon leading Wareham to the 1930 Cape League title, it was noted that Noznesky "has the college connections to select the best players obtainable and is also on friendly terms with managers and officials of several big-league teams who turn over likely looking prospects to him." Another of the first Wareham players to go on to play major league baseball was pitcher Al Blanche, a Somerville, Massachusetts native who played for Wareham in 1931, and went on to play for the major league Boston Braves. 1932 Wareham twirler Emil "Bud" Roy went on to play briefly for Connie Mack's Philadelphia Athletics.

==== The Upper and Lower Cape League era (1946–1962) ====
After a hiatus during the years of World War II, the Cape League was reconstituted in 1946. Wareham first fielded a team in the new league in 1952. In June of that year, the league's Barnstable Barons had impulsively withdrawn from the league after a disputed forfeit ruling, and the league voted to admit Wareham to replace Barnstable for the second half of the season. Wareham has been a member of the Cape League ever since.

Wareham made a deep playoff run in 1957, beginning with a first round defeat of Otis Air Force Base, two games to one in the Upper Cape playoffs. In the series, Wareham rode the stellar pitching of Tom Eccleston, who threw a two-hit shutout in Game 2, and Bruce Reed, who gave up just five hits and helped himself with a homer in the decisive Game 3 victory. The win sent Wareham to the Upper Cape finals against the heavily favored Cotuit Kettleers. Led by the hitting of brothers Bruce and Glenn Reed, Wareham routed Cotuit, 14–2, in Game 1 at Lowell Park, then with Bruce on the mound at home in Game 2, Wareham completed the sweep with a 3–0 shutout of the Kettleers. The win was Wareham's only Upper Cape Division championship of the era. Wareham went on to face the Lower Cape champion Orleans Red Sox in the Cape League finals, but Orleans prevailed in two straight.

=== Modern era (1963–present) ===
==== The 1960s and Wareham's "Mr. Baseball" ====
In 1963, the CCBL was reorganized and became officially sanctioned by the NCAA. The league would no longer be characterized by "town teams" who fielded mainly Cape Cod residents, but would now be a formal collegiate league. Teams began to recruit college players and coaches from an increasingly wide geographic radius.

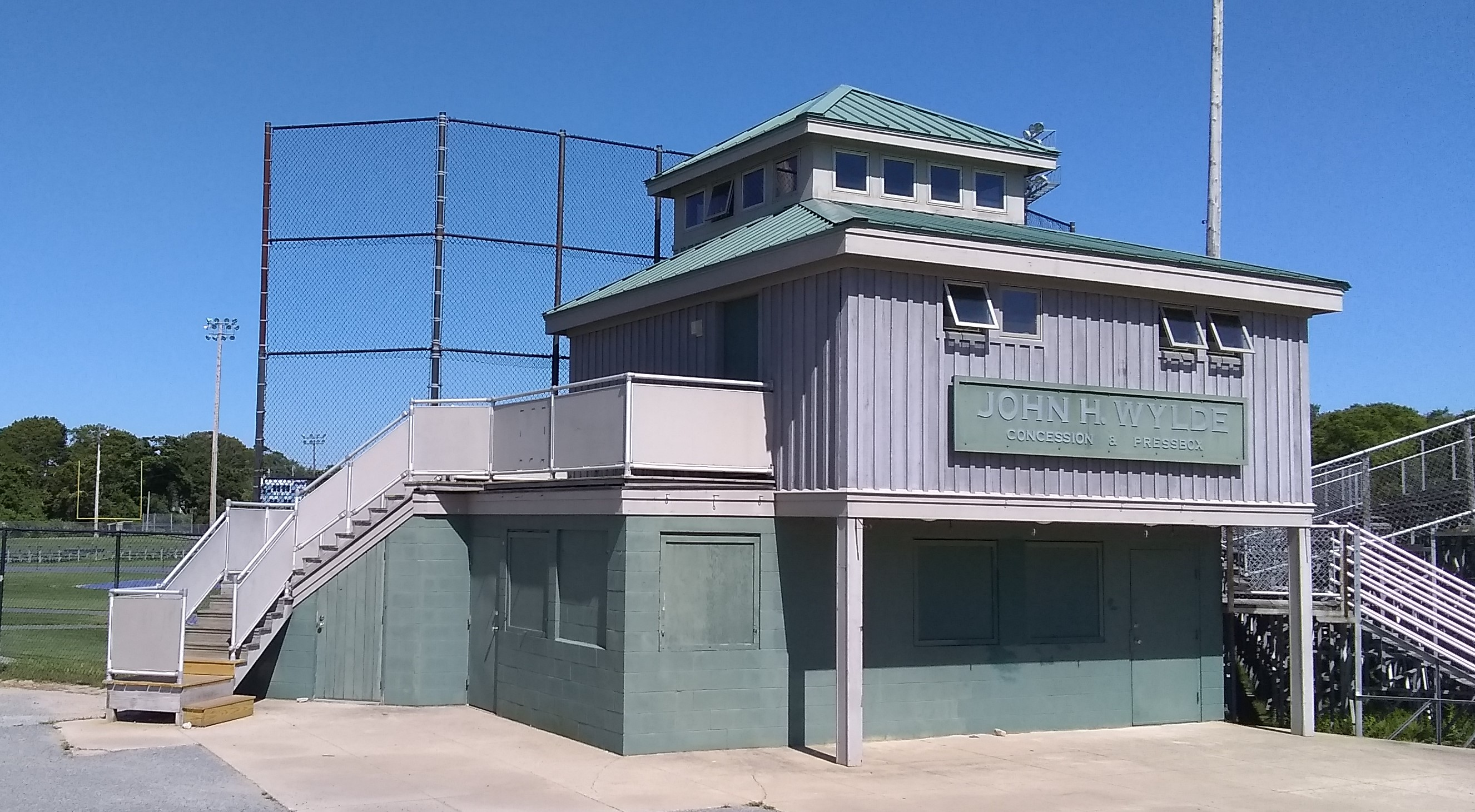
Clem Spillane Field, home of the Gatemen

The league was originally composed of ten teams, which were divided into Upper Cape and Lower Cape divisions. Wareham joined Falmouth, Cotuit, Bourne and Sagamore in the Upper Cape Division. Wareham's team was skippered by Wareham's "Mr. Baseball", CCBL Hall of Famer Steve Robbins. Robbins had played baseball for Wareham High School and later in the Wareham Twilight League, and served at various times as the field manager, general manager, and league representative for the Gatemen.

Wareham qualified for the playoffs in 1963, and defeated the Bourne Canalmen in the first round series before being bounced by Cotuit. In 1965, Clem Spillane Field hosted the CCBL All-Star Game, which was won by the Upper Cape Division, 10–9.

CCBL Hall of Famer Jim Prete joined the Gatemen in 1966. Prete, a '66 graduate of Bourne High School where he was a star infielder, hit .319 for the Gatemen on the season. Prete returned to Wareham in 1967, but played for Bourne in the 1968 season, and missed the 1969 season due to injury. He returned to the Gatemen in 1970, when he had his best year, batting .336 and being named the league's MVP.

==== The 1970s and Wareham's first modern era title ====
In the early 1970s, Wareham was piloted by CCBL Hall of Famer Ed Lyons. Lyons managed four different Cape League franchises over his long career, and retired as the league's all-time winningest manager. In six years with Wareham, Lyons' teams finished atop the league in first place twice, and qualified for the playoffs four times. Lyons' 1971 Wareham team featured league MVP Joe Barkauskas and the league's Outstanding Pitcher, Bob Majczan. Wareham again boasted the league MVP in 1973 and 1974 with Steve Newell and Phil Welch, making it four years out of five that Gatemen took home the award. Newell, an outfielder from the University of Massachusetts Amherst, batted .340 and led the CCBL with 11 homers in 1973. He was inducted into the CCBL Hall of Fame in 2017.

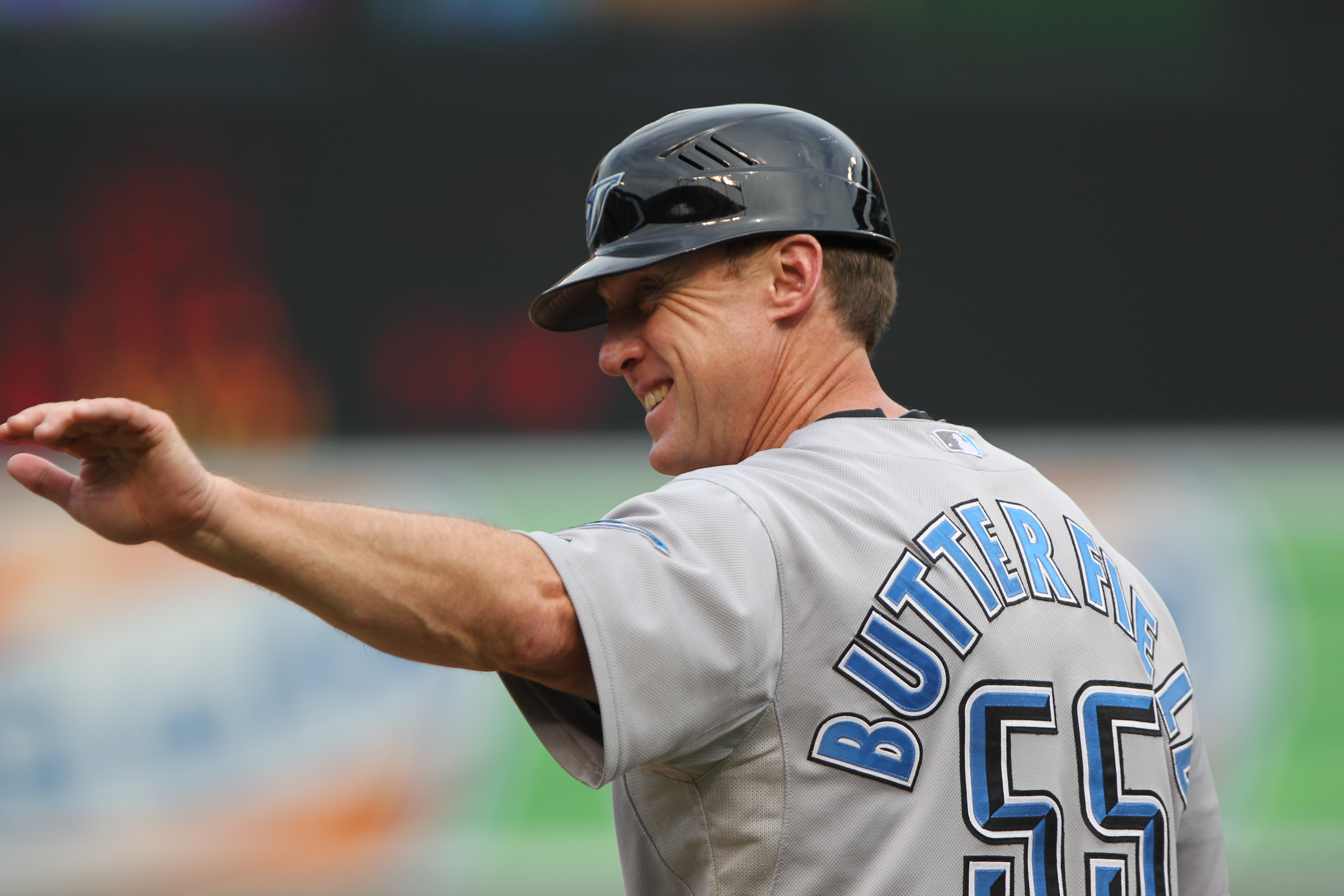
Bangor, Maine native Brian Butterfield had a key RBI in Wareham's 1976 championship series victory.

CCBL Hall of Fame skipper Bill Livesey took the helm at Wareham in 1976. Livesey had previously managed Falmouth to five league titles, including four consecutively from 1968 to 1971, and he promptly brought his winning ways to Wareham. The 1976 Gatemen featured future major leaguers Joe Lefebvre and CCBL Outstanding Pro Prospect Bobby Sprowl. Wareham finished third in the league, and disposed of second place Cotuit in a two-game semi-final series sweep, putting an end to defending champ Cotuit's run of four consecutive titles.

In the best-of-five title series, the Gatemen faced first place Chatham, who had posted an impressive 30–11–1 record in the regular season. Chatham took the opener, 3–2, in ten innings, but Wareham answered in Game 2 as Bangor, Maine native Brian Butterfield came through with a key RBI to propel the Gatemen to victory and even the series. The Gatemen sent Sprowl to the mound for Game 3 and came away with a 4–3 victory, but could only manage three hits in Game 4 as Chatham shut out the Gatemen, 5–0, to knot the series again. Wareham took the exciting back-and-forth Game 5, with Sprowl coming on in relief on short rest to close out the A's and secure Wareham's first CCBL title of the modern era.

==== The 1980s and another championship squad ====
CCBL Hall of Famer John Morris starred for Wareham in 1981. The league MVP batted .410 with a .527 on-base percentage and 17 stolen bases, and set a league record with 50 runs scored. The Gatemen featured the CCBL's Outstanding Pitcher in 1983 and 1984 in Dennis Livingston, the winning pitcher of the 1983 CCBL All-Star Game at Fenway Park, and 1984 recipient Bill Cunningham. The 1984 Gatemen were skippered by a young Mike Roberts, who went on to manage Cotuit throughout the 2000s and 2010s. Behind the play of future major league all-star and World Series champion Walt Weiss, who set a CCBL record with 19 doubles on the season, Roberts led the Gatemen to the league title series where they were downed by Cotuit. In 1986, Wareham again boasted the league's Outstanding Pitcher, future major league all-star Jack Armstrong, who was the winning pitcher at the CCBL All-Star Game at Shea Stadium.

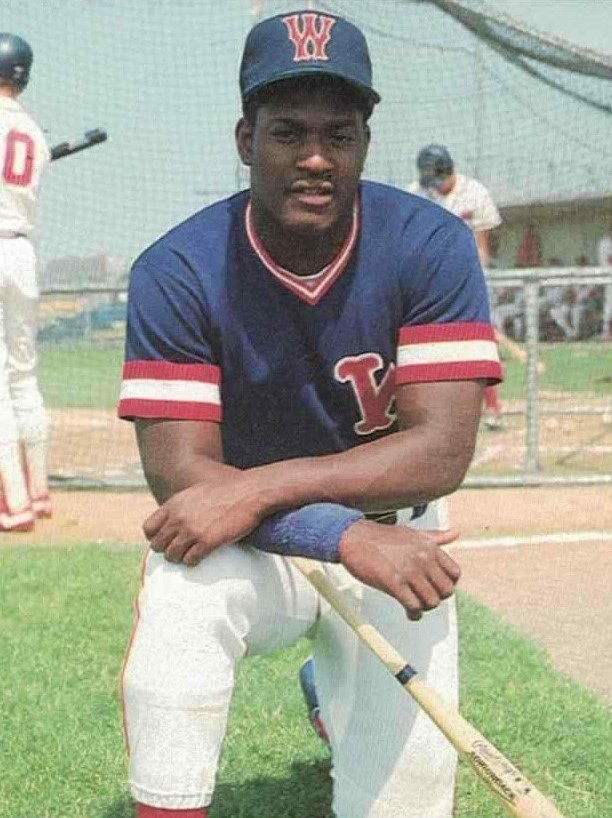
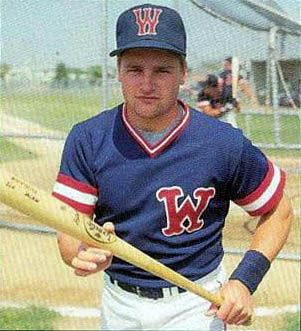
CCBL Hall of Famers Mo Vaughn and Chuck Knoblauch powered the 1988 champion Gatemen.

The 1988 CCBL season boasted perhaps the greatest single-season aggregation of future major league talent in league history. Manager Stan Meek's Gatemen had more than their share of the talent, and rode it to another league title. In addition to CCBL Hall of Famer John Thoden, who posted a 9–1 record and was the league's Outstanding Pitcher, Wareham featured future major league all-star infielder Chuck Knoblauch and future Boston Red Sox fan favorite and American League MVP slugger Mo Vaughn. Amid the glut of high-level prospects in the league that year, Knoblauch was judged tops, receiving the Outstanding Pro Prospect Award. Knoblauch batted .361, and he and Vaughn tied for the league lead in doubles with 17. Vaughn and Knoblauch went on to be inducted to the CCBL Hall of Fame as part of the hall's inaugural and second classes respectively.

The Gatemen finished the 1988 regular season with the league's top record, and disposed of Hyannis in the semi-final playoffs. The title series was a match-up of the Gatemen and the Orleans Cardinals. Orleans starred future Baseball Hall of Famer Frank Thomas, a powerful long-ball hitter who had slammed three home runs in one game at Wareham in the regular season. Wareham took Game 1 at home, 5–3, but the Cardinals took Game 2 by the same score at Eldredge Park to set up the decisive game. In the finale, Thoden tossed a complete game four-hitter at Clem Spillane Field, Rich Samplinski knocked in the go-ahead run, and the Gatemen overcame two potentially disastrous fielding errors in the ninth to edge out the Cards and claim the crown by a tally of 3–2. Thoden shared playoff MVP honors with Vaughn, who went 11-for-20 at the plate in the postseason.

==== The 1990s: A long streak of success ====
Wareham made the playoffs every year from 1990 to 2002, a 13-year streak that remains the league record. During the streak, Wareham reached the championship series seven times, winning four times, including back-to-back championships in 2001 and 2002.

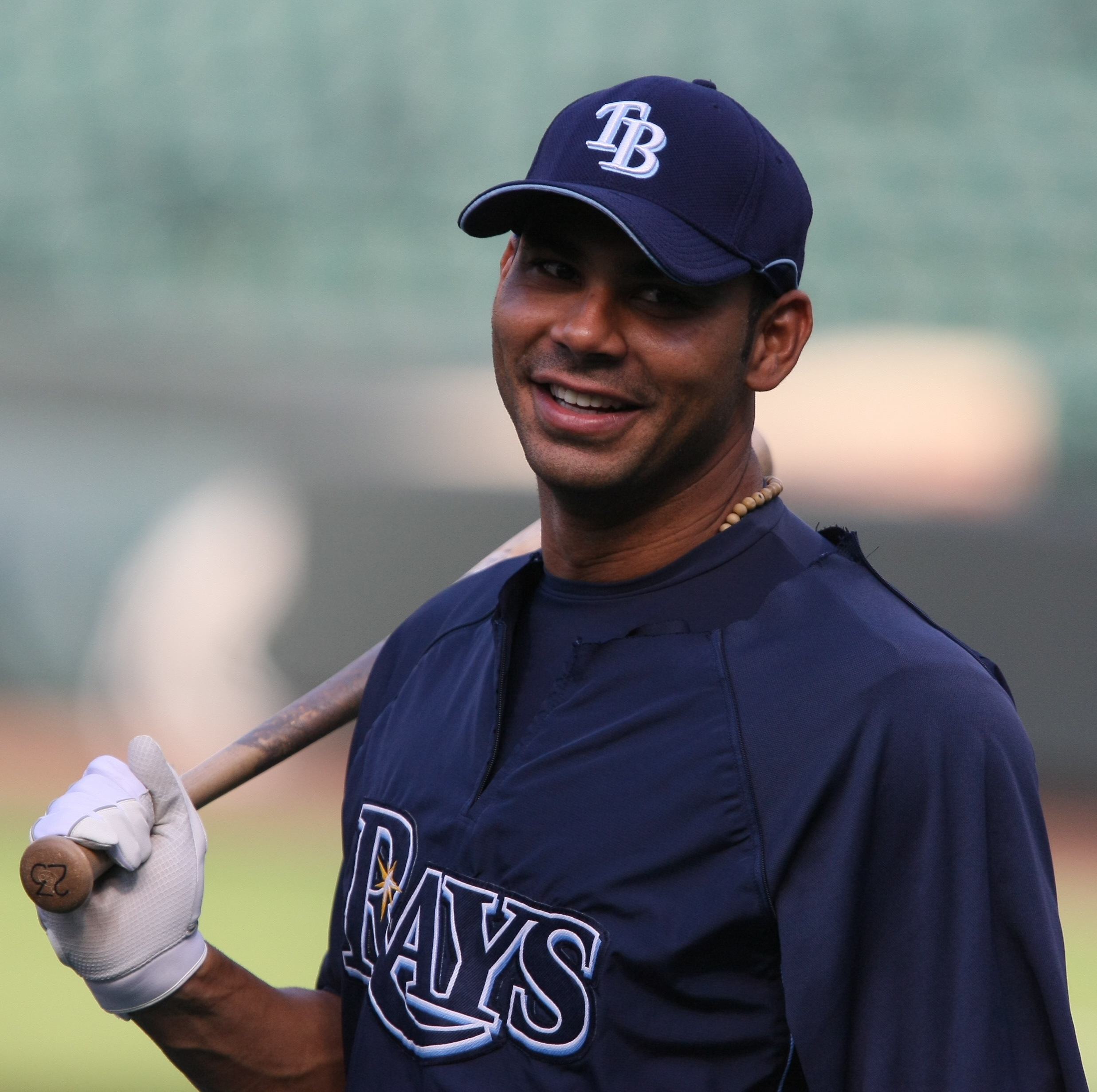
CCBL Hall of Famer Carlos Peña was league MVP for the 1997 CCBL champion Gatemen.

In 1990, the Gatemen reached the CCBL finals, but were ousted by the Yarmouth-Dennis Red Sox. Wareham was led by the league's Outstanding Pro Prospect, Doug Glanville, and CCBL Hall of Famer Mark Smith, who led the league with a .408 average and hit six homers on his way to being named league MVP. For the Red Sox, it was their second consecutive title under CCBL Hall of Fame manager Don Reed. After defeating the Gatemen for the 1990 title, Reed switched sides and became Wareham's field boss in 1991. Reed continued to pilot the Gatemen through 1999, winning another pair of league titles to match his two with Y-D.

Reed's first title with Wareham came in 1994. The Gatemen earned a spot in the finals by defeating Falmouth in the semi-final series via consecutive shutouts, 1–0 and 2–0. Wareham faced Brewster in the championship series, and continued its shutout streak in Game 1 at Clem Spillane Field by blanking the Whitecaps, 7–0, behind a complete game gem by Brian McNichol. Brewster put up a better fight in Game 2 and the teams went into the 13th inning knotted at 3–3. Wareham put across two runs in the top of the frame and allowed just one in the bottom to escape with the 5–4 victory and complete the title series sweep.

Reed's boys were champs again in 1997, led by CCBL Hall of Fame slugger Carlos Peña. The sure-handed first baseman won the league MVP and Sportsmanship awards, and led the CCBL in homers (8) and RBI (33) while batting .318. The team also featured future major league all-star and Cy Young Award winner Barry Zito. The Gatemen finished the regular season first in the West Division, and after a two-game semi-finals sweep of Bourne, faced Harwich for the title. In the championship series, Wareham took Game 1 at home, 9–4. The Gatemen completed the title sweep in Game 2 at Whitehouse Field by a tally of 6–2, with playoff MVP Kevin Hodge's three-run blast in the sixth sealing the victory.

Other notable 1990s Gatemen included Roy Marsh, who set a league record with 48 stolen bases, and was West Division All-Star Game MVP for Wareham in 1993. Wareham's 1996 team boasted league MVP and CCBL Hall of Famer Kevin Nicholson, saves co-leader Clint Chrysler, and CCBL Hall of Famer Lance Berkman, who led the league in batting with a .352 mark. The 1998 Gatemen featured a pair of star moundsmen in CCBL Hall of Famer Ben Sheets and the co-winner of the league's Outstanding Pitcher Award, Phil Devey.

==== The 2000s: back-to-back titles and the passing of a Wareham legend ====
In 2000, skipper Mike Roberts, who had managed the team sixteen years earlier, returned to Wareham and led the team to a first-place finish in the West Division. Roberts' squad starred league MVP Mike Fontenot, Harvard fireballer Ben Crockett, who was co-recipient of the league's Outstanding Pitcher Award, CCBL Hall of Fame hurler Pat Pinkman, returning for a second season in Wareham after winning the 1999 Outstanding Pitcher Award, and ace reliever Jonathan Gonzalez, who posted a microscopic 0.43 ERA. As in 1984, Roberts' second stint with the team lasted only a year, as Cooper Farris took over in 2001 and piloted the club for 14 years, the team's all-time longest-tenured manager.

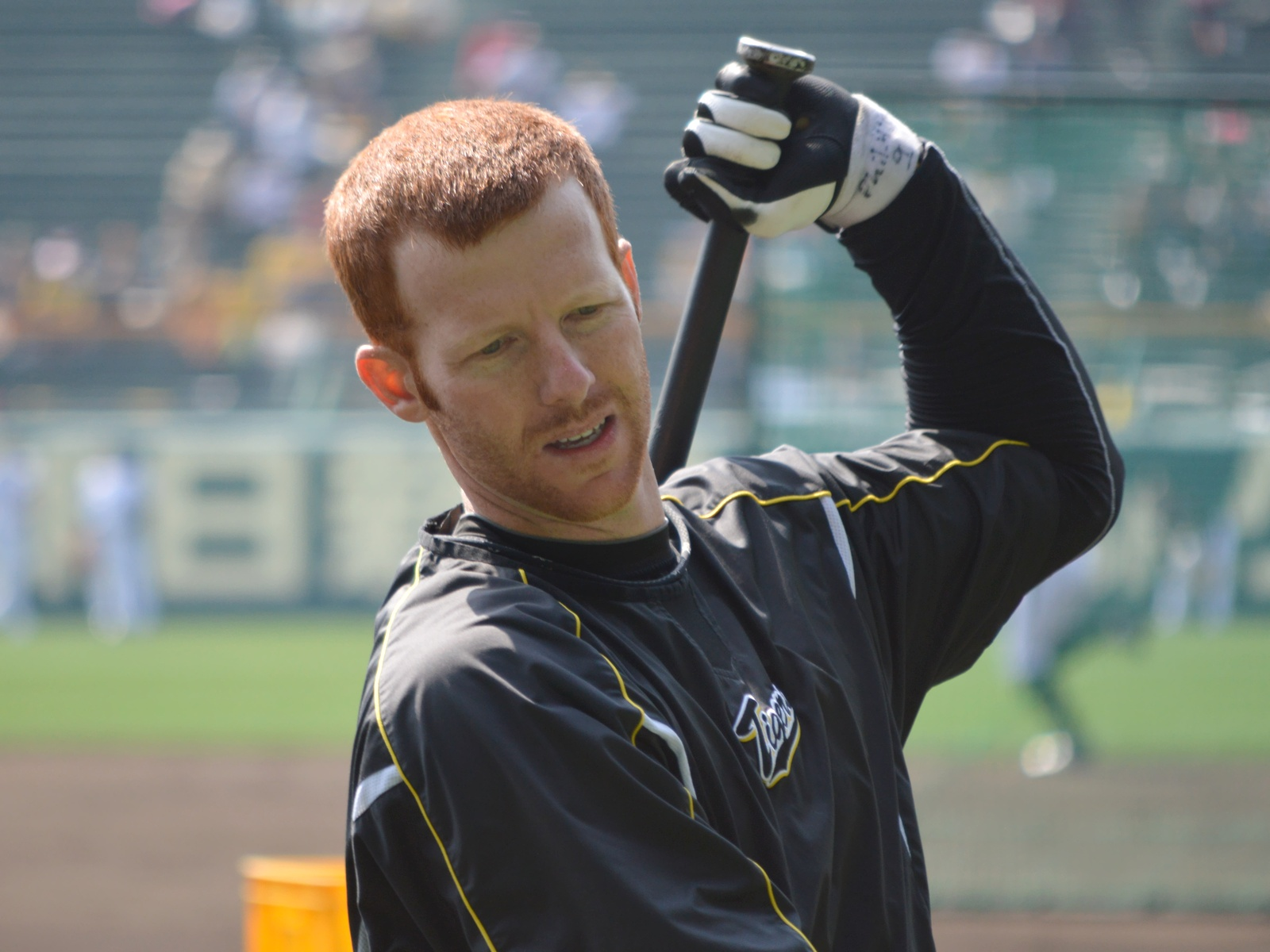
CCBL Hall of Famer Matt Murton starred on Wareham's back-to-back title clubs in 2001 and 2002.

In his first year with the team, Farris' Gatemen club was loaded with talent, and finished the 2001 regular season in first place atop the West Division. The team featured league MVP and CCBL Hall of Famer Matt Murton, and the league batting champ, Eric Reed (.365), who also swiped 22 bags on the season. The Gatemen dominated on the mound as well, boasting the CCBL Outstanding Pitcher Chris Leonard, who posted a 6–0 record with an 0.98 ERA. Ben Crockett, who returned from the 2000 club, was the inaugural winner of the league's Outstanding New England Player Award, recording 74 strikeouts and a 1.67 ERA. The Gatemen defeated Bourne in the semi-final playoff series, and went on to face Chatham for the title.

Game 1 of the 2001 finals at Clem Spillane Field featured no shortage of controversy. A's skipper John Schiffner and shortstop Drew Meyer were tossed in the fifth by CCBL Hall of Fame umpire Nick Zibelli in the aftermath of a disputed fair ball call on Murton's long fly down the left field line. The Gatemen prevailed, 8–3, and headed to Chatham for Game 2 eyeing a sweep, but Chatham stifled the Wareham offense and knotted the series with a 2–1 victory. The decisive Game 3 in Wareham went to the ninth even at 3–3. Gatemen closer and CCBL Hall of Famer Pat Neshek set down the A's in order in the top half of the frame. In the home half, Keith Butler led off with a single and advanced to third on a sacrifice bunt and ground out. With two down and two strikes, Gatemen shortstop Paul Henry chopped a spinner along the third base line that A's pitcher Zane Carlson bobbled as Butler slid home with the series-winning run. Wareham second baseman Aaron Hill, who batted .400 in the postseason, took home playoff MVP honors.

Farris' 2002 Gatemen returned 2001 MVP Murton, who was out with a broken hand during the first half of the season. He returned to hit .400 in 16 games in the second half, and also won the league's All-Star Game Home Run Derby. In the playoffs, Wareham disposed of Cotuit in the semi-final series and met Orleans in the championship round. The star of Game 1 was 6-foot-4 Gatemen righty Kevin Guyette, who tossed a five-hit complete game and allowed just one run in Wareham's 5–1 victory at Eldredge Park. The late-inning fireworks in Game 2 began when Cards manager Carmen Carcone and pitching coach Kelly Nicholson were tossed in the eighth for arguing a balk call. The game went to the bottom of the ninth with the Cardinals clutching a slim 2–1 lead. It looked as though the series would be headed back to Orleans for Game 3 after the first two Gatemen made outs, but Murton poked a single that started a championship rally. Murton moved to third on a David Murphy single, and came home on an Orleans error to tie the score. With the Clem Spillane crowd in a frenzy, Brown University's Matt Kutler promptly thumped the game-winner off the left-field fence, bringing in Murphy and securing Wareham's second consecutive league crown. For his title-clinching poke, Kutler was named playoff MVP.

Wareham's 2003 team featured pitchers Wade Townsend, the league's Outstanding Pro Prospect, and CCBL Hall of Famer Jeremy Sowers, who posted a 1.20 ERA with 64 strikeouts in 67.1 innings. Along with their wealth of pitching, the 2003 Gatemen boasted the league's hits leader in CCBL Hall of Fame third baseman Warner Jones. Jones returned to Wareham in 2004 and led the league again in hits, as well as in doubles and extra-base hits. CCBL Hall of Fame closer Justin Masterson went 3–1 for the 2005 Gatemen, recording 10 saves with a 1.15 ERA and 39 strikeouts in 31.1 innings. The team experienced a playoff drought from 2003 to 2009, qualifying for postseason play only once in seven seasons when the 2006 team reached the finals and was downed by Y-D.

Longtime Gatemen President and General Manager John Wylde died in February 2009 after a battle with liver cancer. The Cape Cod Baseball League Hall of Famer was the force behind the Gatemen for 25 years. In the early 80s, the Wareham Gatemen franchise was in financial trouble with very little local support and was on the verge of collapse. Wylde stepped in as president and General Manager and turned the Gatemen into a model franchise. On June 13, 2008, the Cape Cod Baseball League and the Wareham Gatemen honored him during special ceremonies. In 2007, Wylde was inducted into the Cape Cod Baseball League's Hall of Fame.

==== Two more titles highlight the 2010s ====
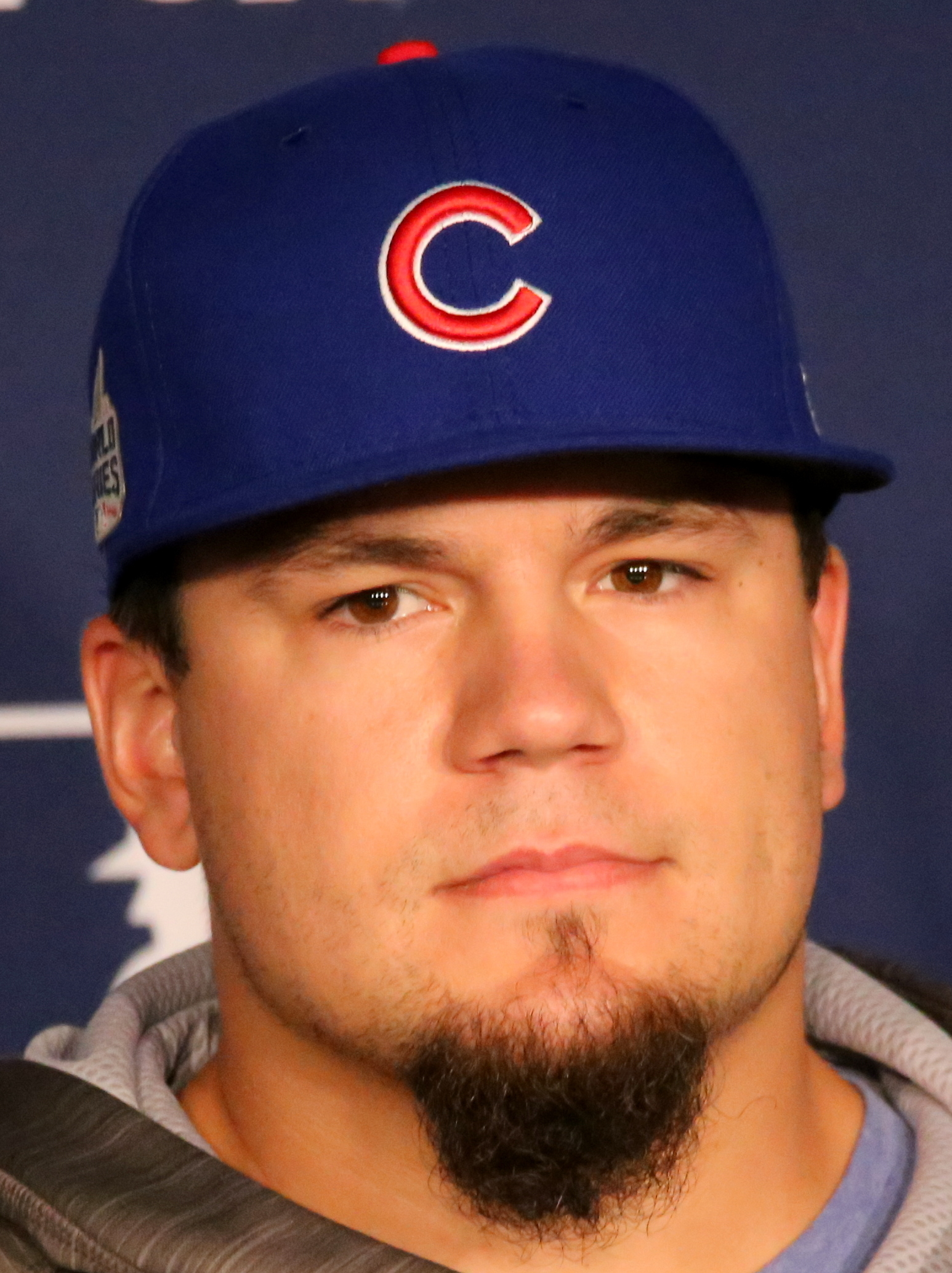
CCBL Hall of Famer Kyle Schwarber was playoff MVP of Wareham's 2012 CCBL championship squad.

The 2012 Gatemen won only seven of their 22 home games, but finished second in the West Division. The team starred CCBL Hall of Fame slugger Tyler Horan, a Middleborough, Massachusetts native who crushed 16 homers in the regular season, tying the CCBL wood bat record, and took home the league's Outstanding New England Player Award. In the postseason, Wareham swept Falmouth in the first round, then swept Bourne in the West Division final. In the championship, the Gatemen met Y-D in a rematch of the 2006 title series. The Gatemen took Game 1 in Yarmouth by a score of 5–4 on a go-ahead ninth inning home run by catcher Tyler Ross. Y-D pitching shut down Wareham's attack in Game 2 at Spillane Field, and the Red Sox emerged with a 5–1 win to even the series. The decisive Game 3 at Y-D was an all-time classic. The Red Sox looked to be closing in on a championship, leading 5–2 as the game moved to the final frame, but CCBL Hall of Famer Kyle Schwarber had other ideas. Schwarber smashed a homer in the ninth and the Gatemen pushed across two more to tie the game. With the Red Sox crowd in stunned disbelief, Schwarber came up again in the tenth and belted a two-run dinger as Wareham struck for three more runs to go ahead, 8–5. Y-D managed a solo homer in the bottom of the tenth to make it 8–6, but Wareham held on to claim the crown with Schwarber taking home playoff MVP honors.

Clem Spillane Field hosted the CCBL All-Star Game festivities in 2015, and the hosts took home top honors as Gatemen Logan Sowers was home run derby champ, and hurler Ian Hamilton was named West Division co-MVP in the West's tight 1–0 loss. Wareham boasted the league's batting champ in three consecutive years from 2015 to 2017. CCBL Hall of Famer Andrew Calica's lofty .425 mark in 2015 is among the tops in league history. Cole Freeman took the crown in 2016, and Tanner Dodson in 2017.

In 2018, the Gatemen won their first 4 games and never lost more than two games in a row, finishing the regular season atop the West Division for the first time since 2001. In the postseason, Wareham swept Cotuit in the first-round series and did the same to Falmouth in the semi-final round. In the championship, the Gatemen faced off against East Division champion Chatham. Game 1 at Spillane Field was a back-and-forth battle between aces Ryan Garcia for Wareham and Austin Bergner for Chatham, but the Anglers' defense faltered and was responsible for three unearned Wareham runs that propelled the Gatemen to a 5–3 victory. Game 2 at Veterans Field was played in two parts due to a Chatham fog-out, but Wareham's timely hitting and a clutch home run robbery by Gatemen right fielder Isaac Collins led Wareham to the title-clinching 9–3 victory. Third baseman Austin Shenton hit .522 with three home runs and 12 RBI to claim postseason MVP honors, and the video of Collins' grab made national headlines and was the top play on ESPN's SportsCenter. The crown was Wareham's eighth in the modern era, and the team was the first to sweep the CCBL postseason since the playoffs expanded to three rounds.

The 2019 Gatemen featured the league's Outstanding Pitcher, Ian Bedell, who posted an 0.58 ERA in 30.2 innings, striking out 36 while walking only two. Bedell was the West Division All-Star Game starter, but it was Gatemen teammate Matt McLain who took home All-Star Game MVP honors for the West, having hit a homer and single with three RBIs.

==== The 2020s ====
The 2020 CCBL season was cancelled due to the coronavirus pandemic. CCBL Hall of Famer Harvey Shapiro took the helm as the club's field manager in 2022, and in 2023 was succeeded by Ryan Smyth, who had been a longtime assistant coach with Brewster.

== CCBL Hall of Fame inductees ==
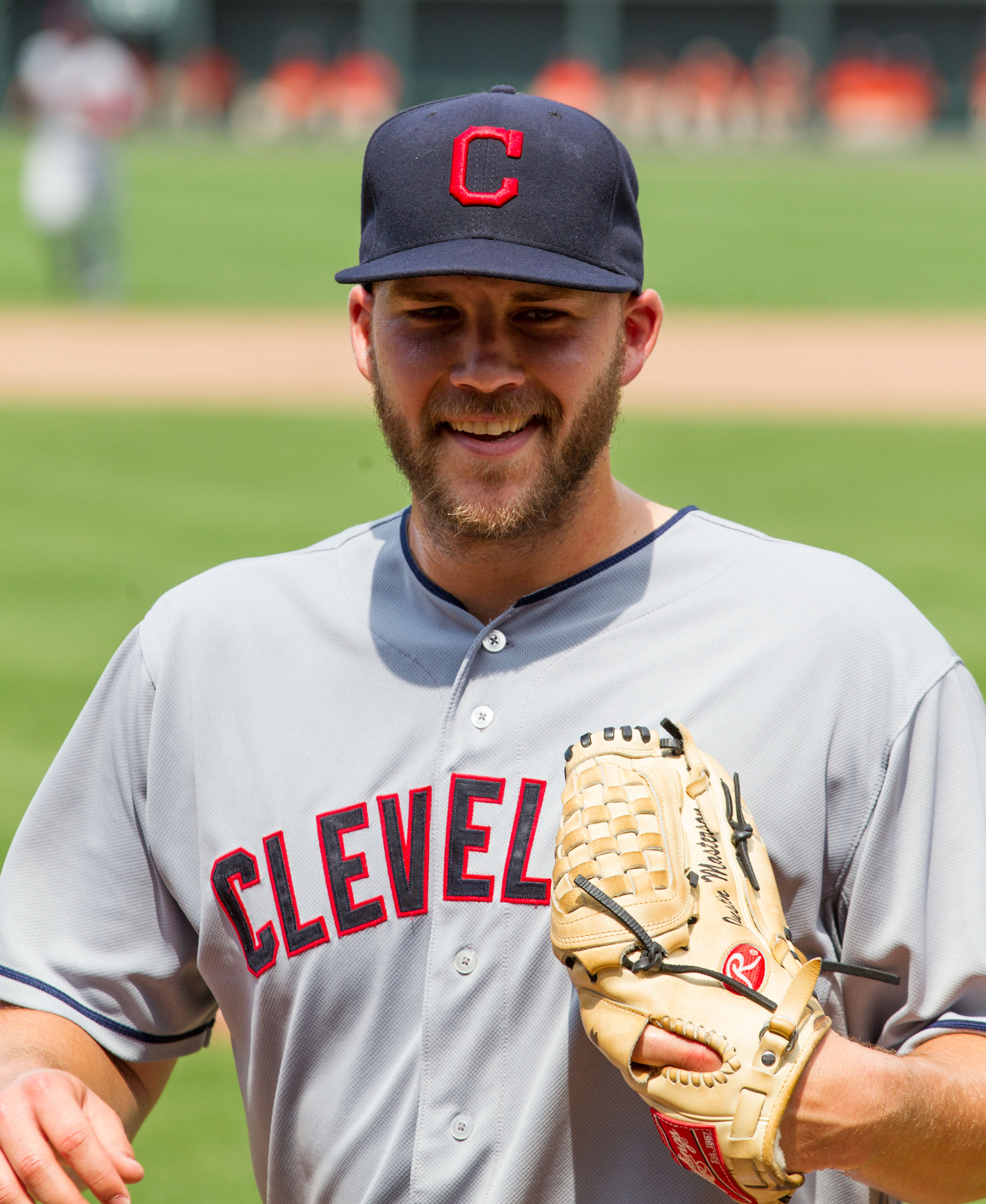
CCBL Hall of Famer Justin Masterson

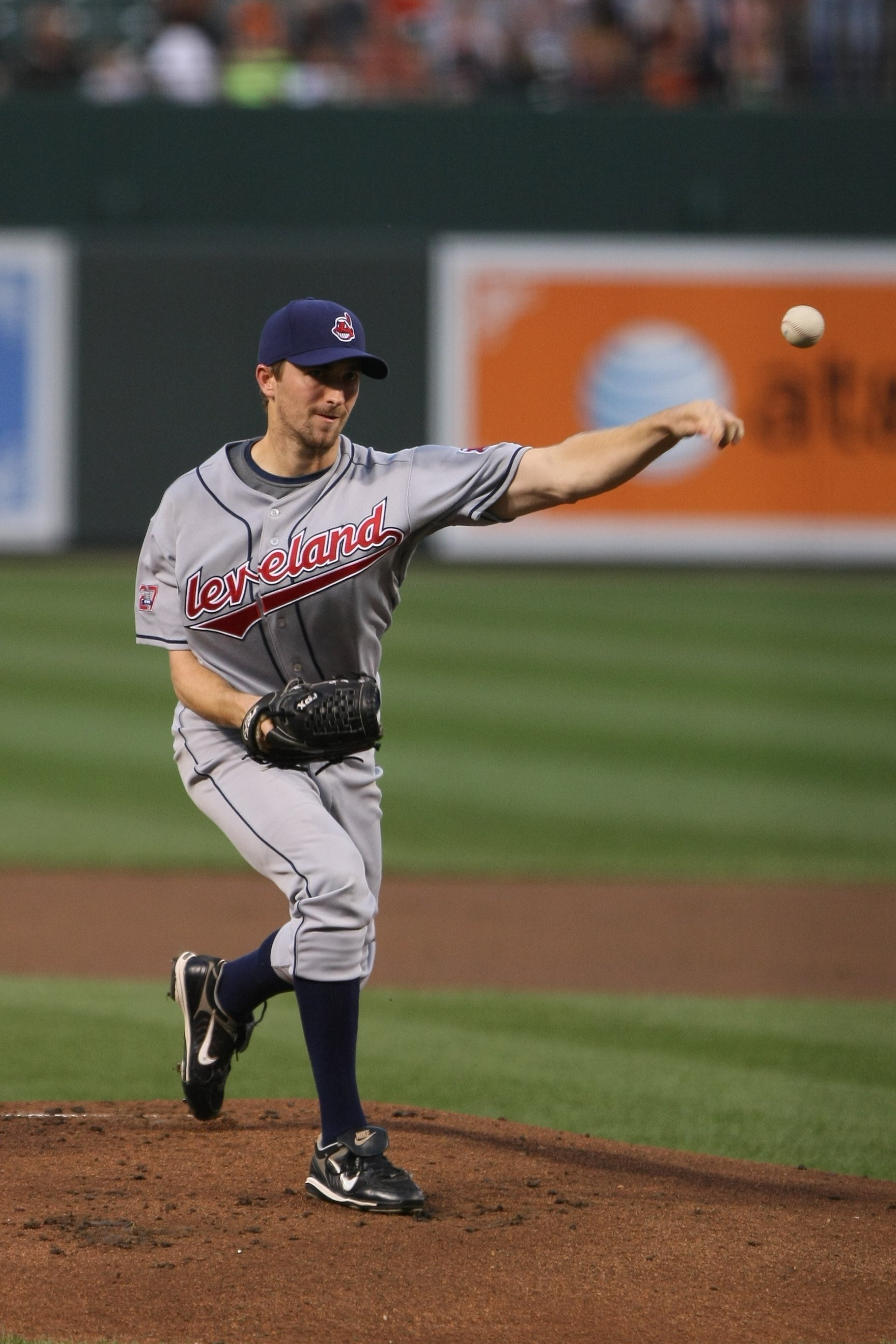
CCBL Hall of Famer Jeremy Sowers

The CCBL Hall of Fame and Museum is a history museum and hall of fame honoring past players, coaches, and others who have made outstanding contributions to the CCBL. Below are the inductees who spent all or part of their time in the Cape League with Wareham.

Year Inducted	Ref.	Name	Position
2000		Ed Lyons	Manager
2000		Mo Vaughn	Player
2001		Chuck Knoblauch	Player
2002		Bill Livesey	Manager
2003		Carlos Pena	Player
2004		Don Reed	Manager
2005		John Thoden	Player
2006		Jim Hubbard	Executive
2007		John Wylde	Executive
2007		John Morris	Player
2008		Matt Murton	Player
2008		Ben Sheets	Player
2009		Mark Angelo	Player
2010		Steve Robbins	Player / Manager / Executive
2011		Mark Smith	Player
2013		Jim Prete	Player
2016		Warner Jones	Player
2017		Steve Newell	Player
2017		Justin Masterson	Player
2017		Jeremy Sowers	Player
2019		Kyle Schwarber	Player
2020		Tyler Horan	Player
2020		Harvey Shapiro	Manager
2023		Lance Berkman	Player
2024		Andrew Calica	Player
2024		Pat Neshek	Player
2025		Pat Pinkman	Player
2026		Kevin Nicholson	Player

== Notable alumni ==
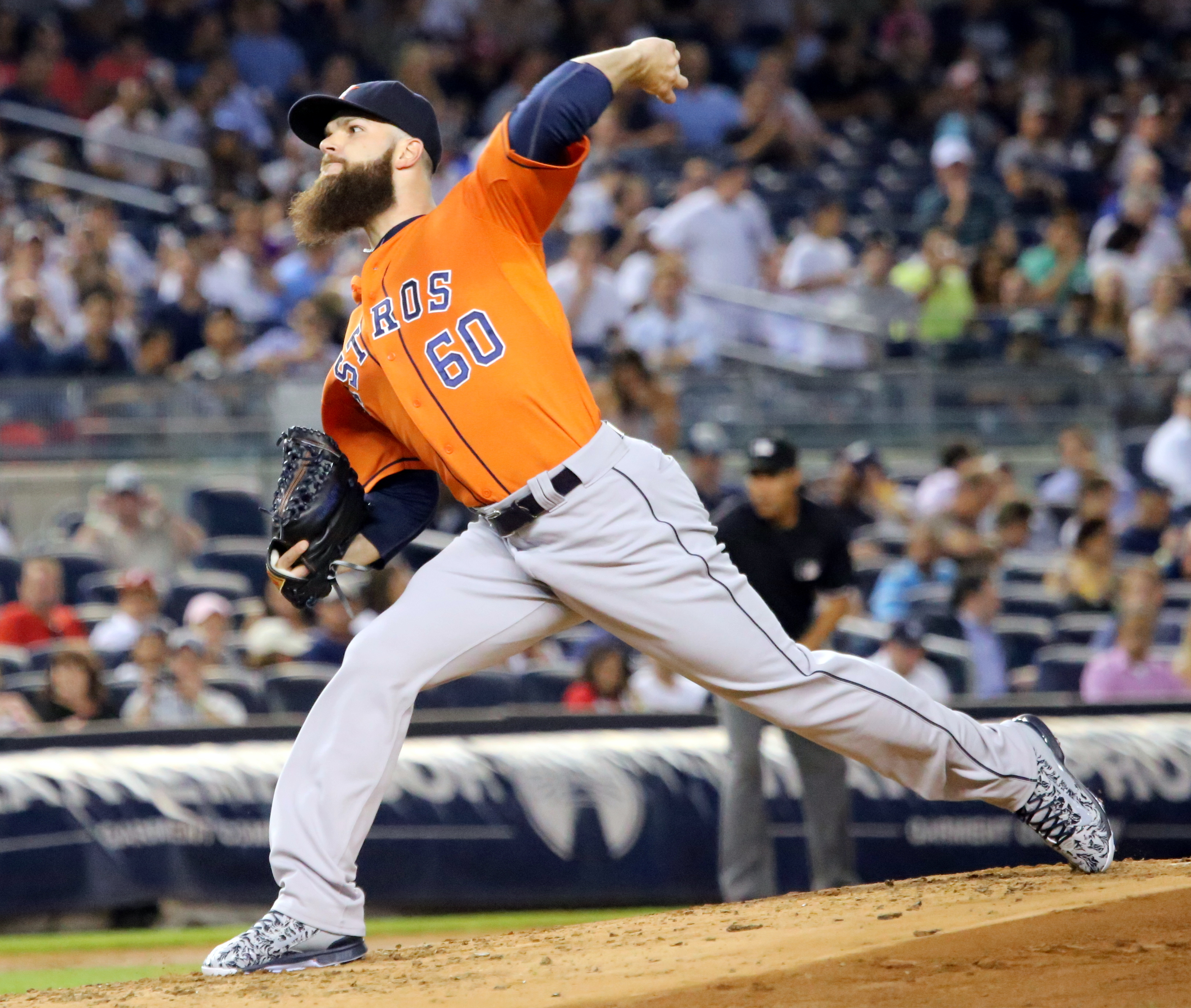
Dallas Keuchel

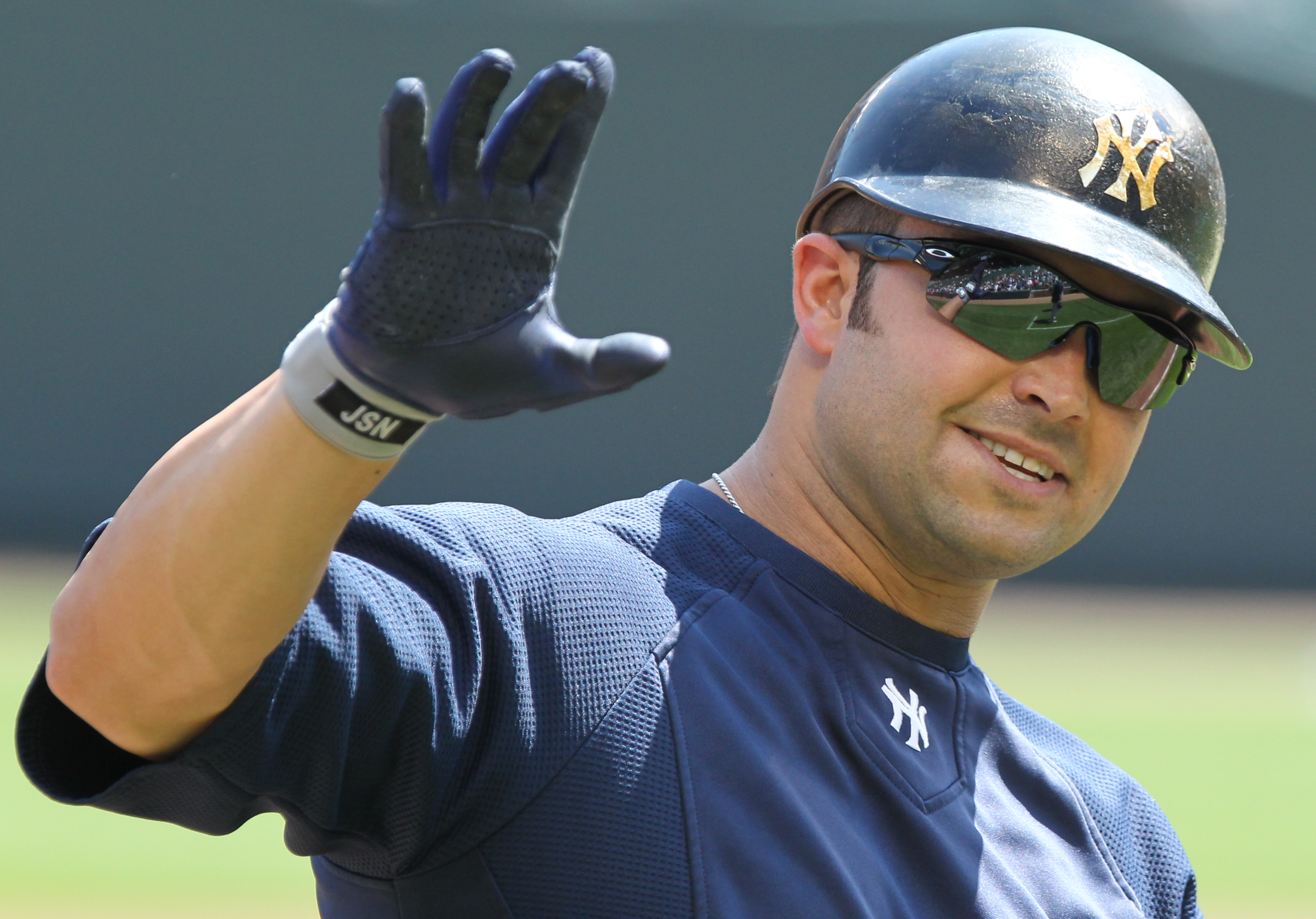
Nick Swisher

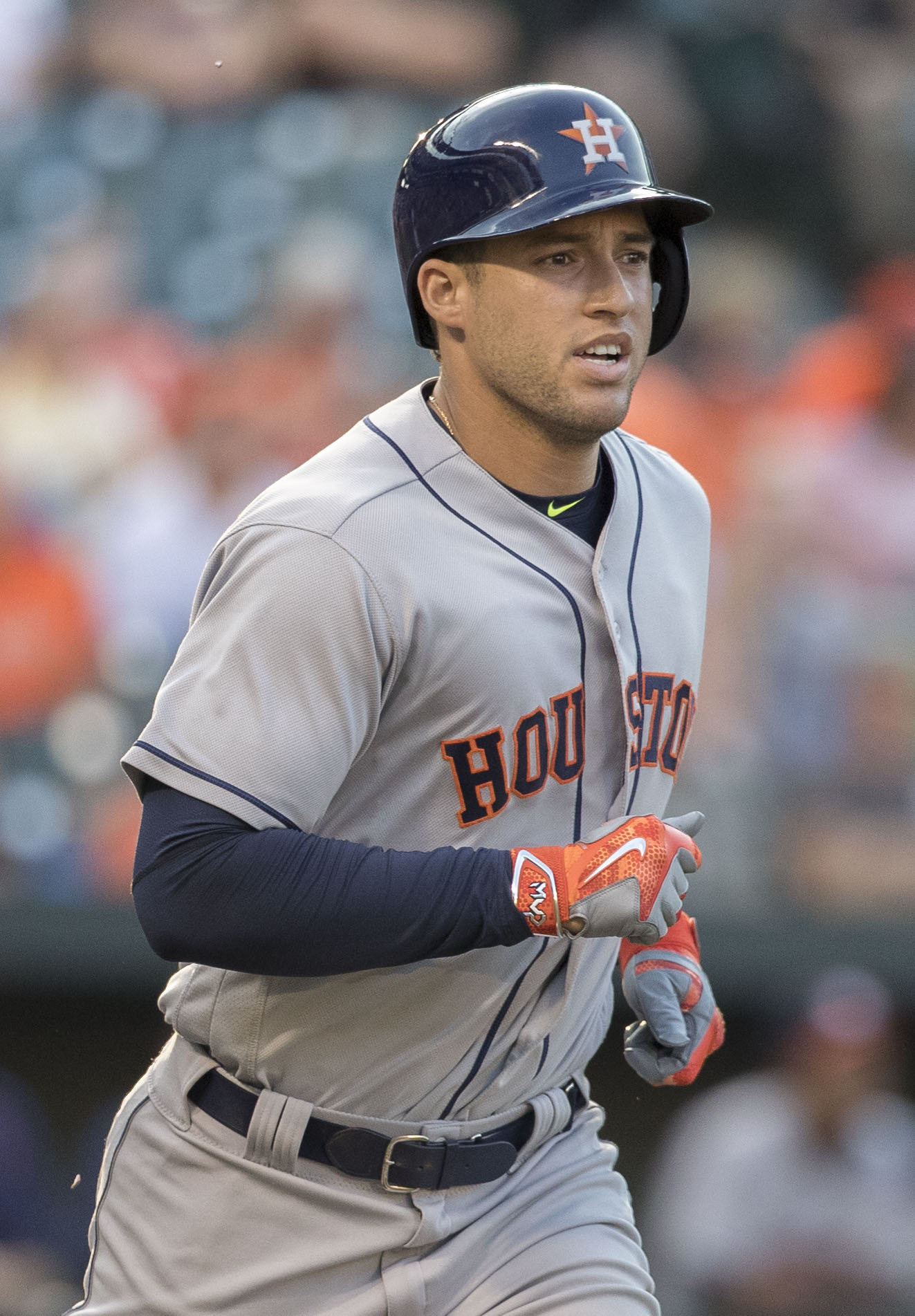
George Springer

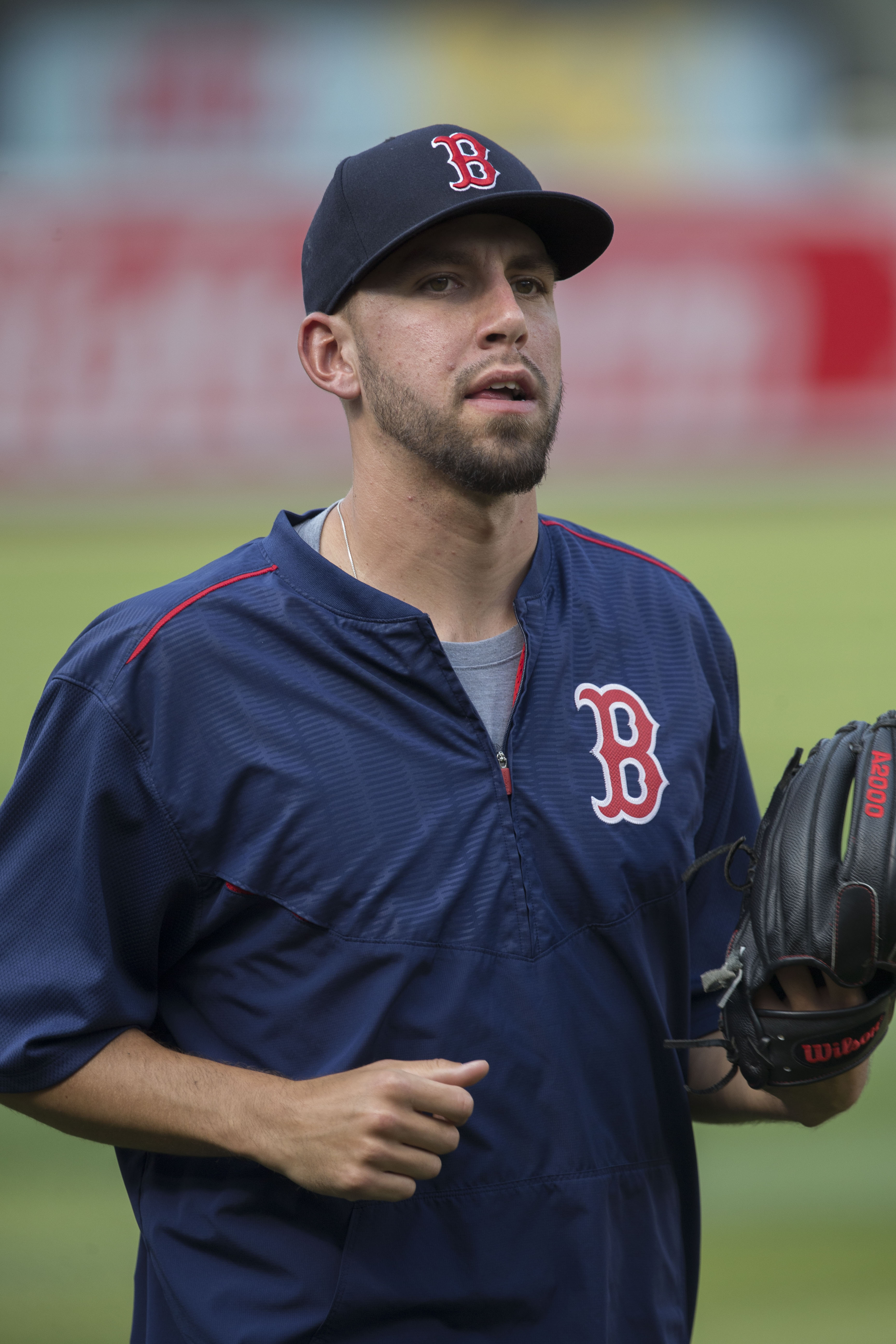
Matt Barnes

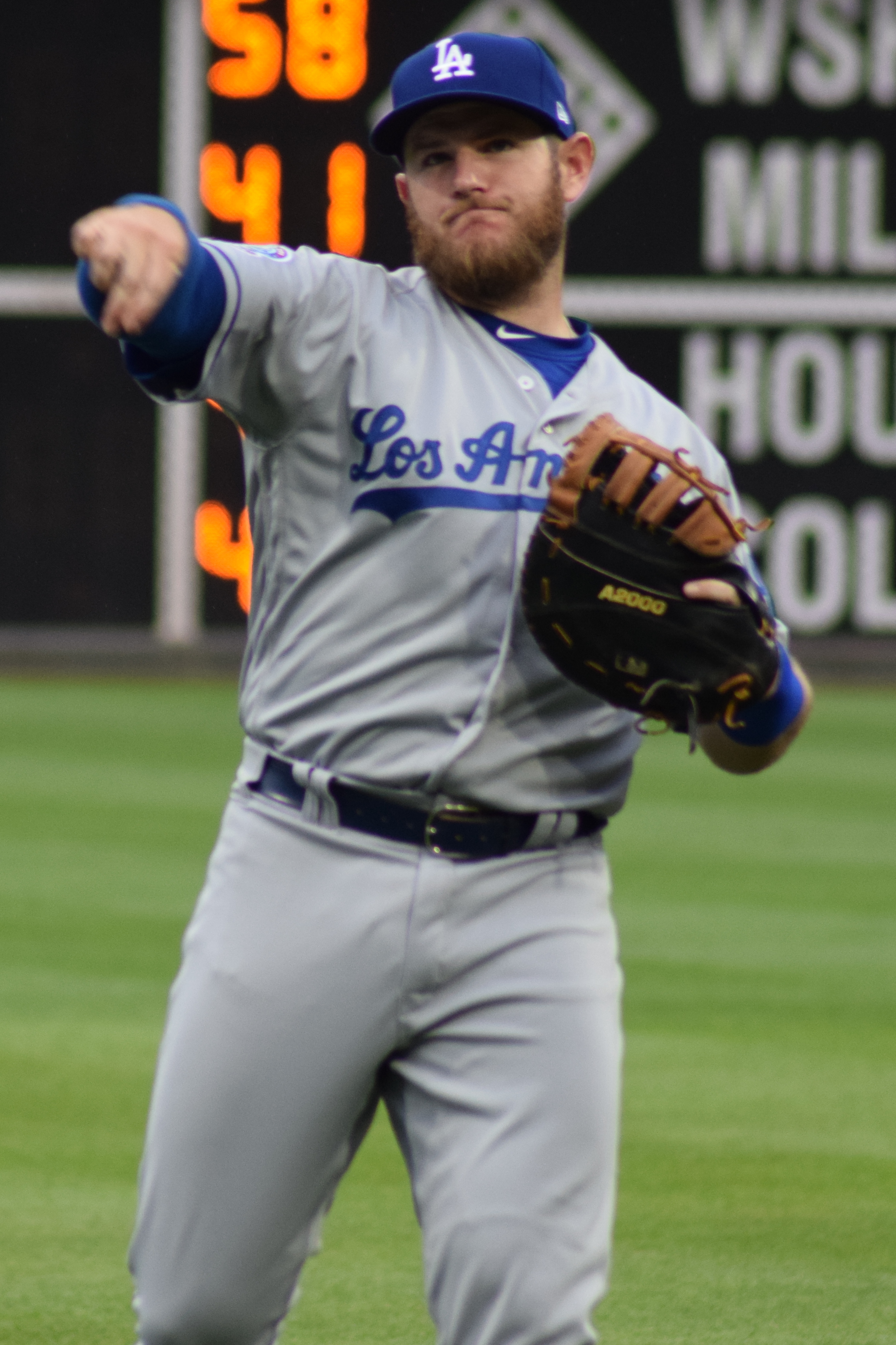
Max Muncy

- Armando Alvarez 2015
- Brian Anderson 1991–1992
- Marlon Anderson 1994
- Max Anderson 2022
- Shaun Anderson 2015
- Jeff Andra 1996
- John Andreoli 2010–2011
- Jack Armstrong 1985–1986
- Barrett Astin 2011–2012
- Scott Atchison 1996
- Mark Bailey 1981
- Darren Baker 2019
- Paul Bako 1992
- Scott Bankhead 1982–1983
- Travis Banwart 2006
- Daniel Bard 2005
- Matt Barnes 2009–2010
- Joey Bart 2016
- Lance Berkman 1996
- Tanner Bibee 2019
- Larry Bigbie 1998
- Bruce Billings 2005
- Al Blanche 1931
- Matt Blank 1996
- Jeremy Bleich 2006–2007
- Brett Boretti 1992–1993
- John Bormann 2014
- Jed Bradley 2010
- Jack Brannigan 2021
- Troy Brohawn 1993
- Jaime Bubela 1999
- Randy Bush 1979
- Todd Butler 1986
- Brian Butterfield 1976
- Willie Calhoun 2014
- Paul Carey 1987
- Cade Cavalli 2018
- Brendan Cellucci 2018–2019
- Chris Clapinski 1990–1991
- Stan Clarke 1980
- Brad Clontz 1991
- Kyle Cody 2014
- Isaac Collins 2018
- Brett Conine 2016–2017
- Gene Connell 1930
- Lance Cormier 2000
- Tom Cosgrove 2016
- Darron Cox 1988
- Jimmy Crooks 2021
- José Cuas 2014
- Pat Daneker 1995–1996
- Chase Davis 2022
- Ike Davis 2007
- Tommy Davis 1993
- Blake Dean 2007
- Adrian Del Castillo 2019
- Rich DeLucia 1984
- Phil Devey 1998
- Alex Dickerson 2009–2010
- Derek Dietrich 2009
- Tanner Dodson 2017
- Oliver Dunn 2018
- Jarren Duran 2017
- Ed Easley 2005
- Scott Effross 2014
- Brett Eibner 2008–2009
- Bryce Elder 2019
- John Ely 2006
- Matt Erickson 1996
- Jorge Fábregas 1989
- Jim Farr 1976–1977
- Luke Farrell 2011
- Johnny Field 2011
- Nelson Figueroa 1994
- Jake Fishman 2016
- Richard Fitts 2021
- Mike Fontenot 2000
- Mike Frank 1995
- Robert Garcia 2016
- Frank German 2017
- Doug Glanville 1990
- Robbie Glendinning 2016
- Tom Grant 1978
- Kendall Graveman 2012
- Cole Green 2009
- Charlie Greene 1990
- Jeremy Griffiths 1998
- Justin Hagenman 2017
- Jerry Hairston Jr. 1997
- Ian Hamilton 2015
- Hogan Harris 2016
- KJ Harrison 2016
- Shawn Haviland 2005–2006
- Mike Henneman 1983
- Aaron Hill 2001
- Jonathan Holder 2012
- Mike Hollimon 2003
- Justin Holmes 2003
- Craig House 1998
- Zac Houston 2015
- Chris Howard 1985
- Kevin Howard 2000
- J. P. Howell 2003
- Bobby Hughes 1991
- Pete Incaviglia 1983
- Jim Jarvis 2021
- Daulton Jefferies 2015
- Jake Kalish 2014
- Anthony Kay 2014–2015
- Sean Kazmar 2003
- Dallas Keuchel 2007–2008
- Dean Kiekhefer 2009
- John Kiely 1987
- Kevin King 1988
- Andrew Knizner 2014–2015
- Chuck Knoblauch 1988
- Ryan Kreidler 2018
- Matt Krook 2015
- Steven Kwan 2017
- Ryan LaMarre 2009
- Matt Langwell 2007
- Andy LaRoche 2003
- Jalal Leach 1989
- Wade LeBlanc 2005
- Joe Lefebvre 1976–1977
- Jake Lemmerman 2008–2009
- Adam Lind 2003
- Trey Lipscomb 2019
- Brandon Lockridge 2017
- Easton Lucas 2018
- Willie MacIver 2017
- David MacKinnon 2015
- Paul Mainieri 1978
- Mark Manfredi 2023
- Jim Mann 1993
- Nick Margevicius 2016
- John Marzano 1982
- Justin Masterson 2005
- Adam Mazur 2021
- L. J. Mazzilli 2010–2011
- Allen McDill 1991
- Collin McHugh 2007
- Andrew McKirahan 2010
- Matt McLain 2019
- Brian McNichol 1994
- Spencer Miles 2021
- Wade Miley 2007
- Drew Millas 2018
- Matt Miller 1994–1995
- Casey Mize 2016
- Dustan Mohr 1996
- McKinley Moore 2018
- Yohandy Morales 2021
- John Morris 1981
- Scott Mullen 1995
- Max Muncy 2010–2011
- David Murphy 2001–2002
- Tommy Murphy 1999
- Matt Murton 2001–2002
- Samy Natera Jr. 2021
- Pat Neshek 2001
- Sean Newcomb 2012–2013
- Kevin Nicholson 1996
- Mike Nickeas 2002
- Andy Oliver 2007
- Daniel Palka 2011–2012
- Mike Parisi 2002
- Jeff Parrett 1982
- Carlos Peña 1997
- Lance Pendleton 2003
- Brandon Pfaadt 2019
- Josh Phegley 2007
- Jeff Pickler 1997
- Chris Pittaro 1980
- Zach Plesac 2015
- Jeff Plympton 1985
- John Poff 1972–1973
- Tristan Pompey 2017
- Zach Pop 2016
- Luke Putkonen 2006
- Brian Raabe 1989
- Jack Ralston 2018
- Corey Ray 2014
- Robert Ray 2004
- Eric Reed 2001
- Robert Refsnyder 2011
- Mike Remlinger 1987
- Griffin Roberts 2017
- Kramer Robertson 2014–2015
- Joe Rock 2019
- Alan Roden 2022
- Matt Rogelstad 2002
- Landen Roupp 2019
- Emil "Bud" Roy 1932
- Matt Ruebel 1988
- Nick Rumbelow 2012
- Kevin Russo 2005
- Blake Sabol 2017
- Kyle Schwarber 2012–2013
- Gary Scott 1987
- Mike Seander 2008
- Bob Sebra 1981
- Ben Sheets 1998
- Gavin Sheets 2016
- Austin Shenton 2018
- Danny Silva 1927
- Tony Sipp 2003
- Paul Skenes 2021
- Ethan Small 2016
- Mark Smith 1990
- Earl Snyder 1996
- Jeremy Sowers 2002–2003
- Scott Spiezio 1992
- Shea Spitzbarth 2015
- George Springer 2009–2010
- Bobby Sprowl 1976
- Steve Stanicek 1981
- Denny Stark 1995
- Nick Stavinoha 2003
- Chad Stevens 2019
- Brock Stewart 2013
- Bryson Stott 2018
- Colby Suggs 2012
- Brendan Summerhill 2024
- B. J. Surhoff 1983
- Brent Suter 2011
- Matt Svanson 2021
- Bill Swaggerty 1978
- Nick Swisher 2000
- Brian Tallet 1997–1998
- Mickey Tettleton 1980
- Bob Tewksbury 1979–1980
- Duane Theiss 1974
- Ryan Theriot 2000
- Wade Townsend 2003
- Tommy Troy 2021
- Spencer Turnbull 2013
- Andrew Vaughn 2018
- Mo Vaughn 1987–1988
- Konner Wade 2011–2012
- Ken Waldichuk 2018
- Andrew Walters 2021
- Matt Watson 1998
- Walt Weiss 1984
- Mike Welch 1992
- Derek West 2018
- Cameron Weston 2022
- Kevin Whelan 2004
- Brendan White 2018
- Weston Wilson 2015
- Robbie Wine 1982
- Jack Winkler 2019
- Grant Wolfram 2017
- Brad Woodall 1990
- Stephen Woods Jr. 2015
- Brandon Workman 2008–2009
- Noah Zavolas 2017
- Lance Zawadzki 2005
- Barry Zito 1997–1998
- Tyler Zombro 2015

== Yearly results ==
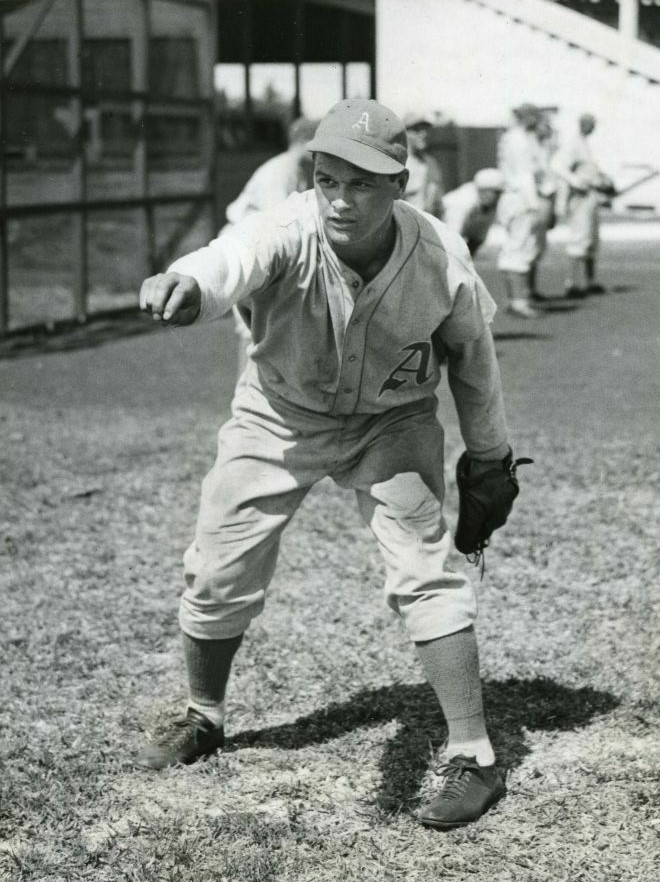
Bud Roy pitched for Wareham in 1932, and for the Philadelphia Athletics the following season.

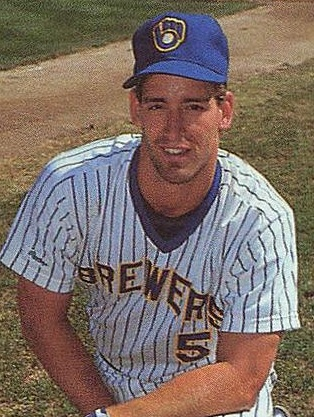
B. J. Surhoff of the 1983 Wareham Gatemen was selected first overall in the 1985 MLB draft.

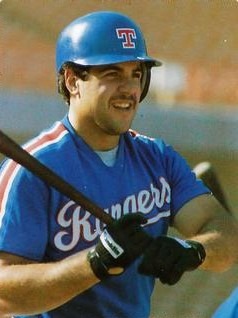
1983 Gateman Pete Incaviglia

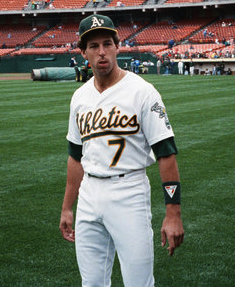
1984 Gateman Walt Weiss hit a CCBL record 19 doubles.

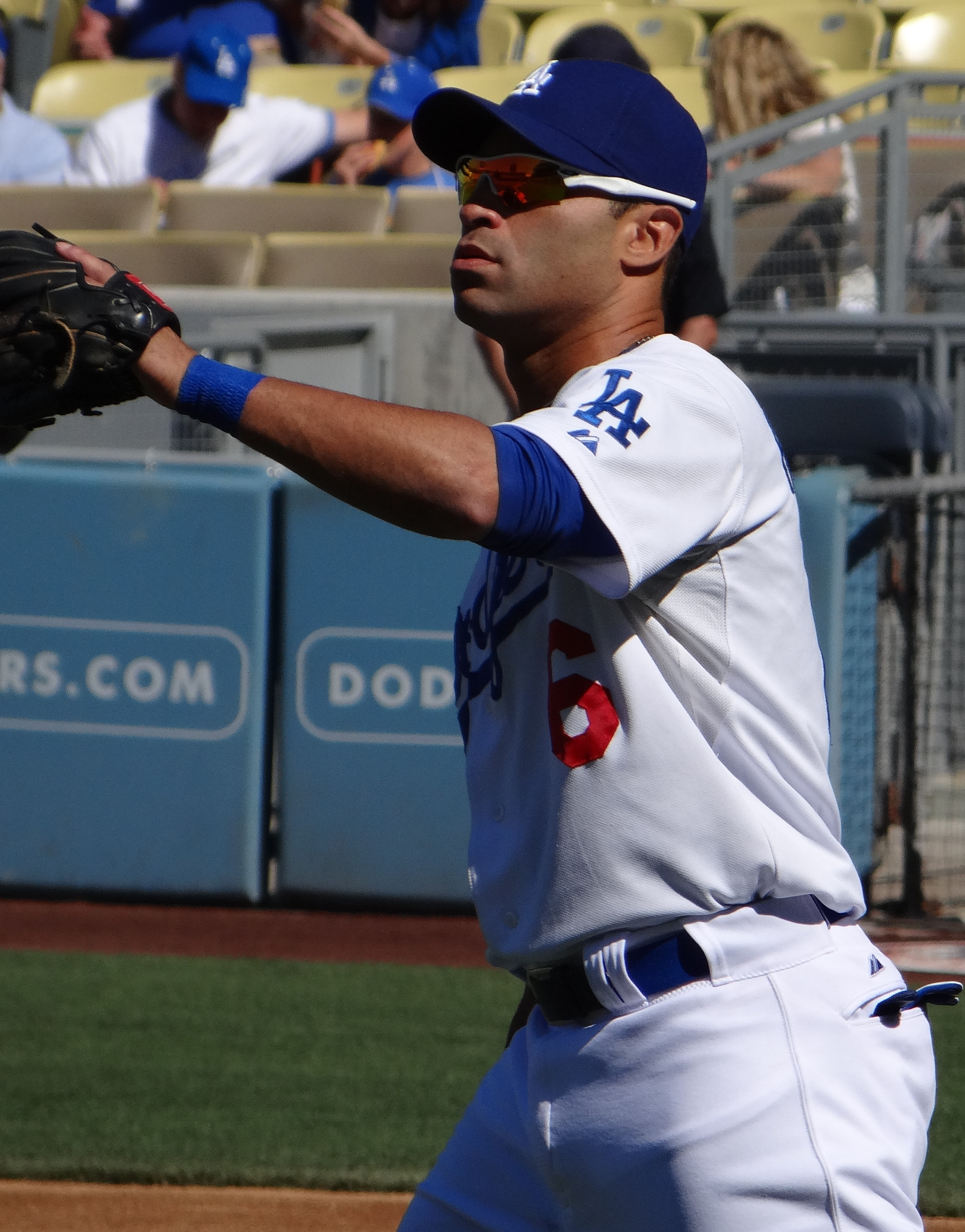
Jerry Hairston Jr. won a CCBL title with Wareham in 1997

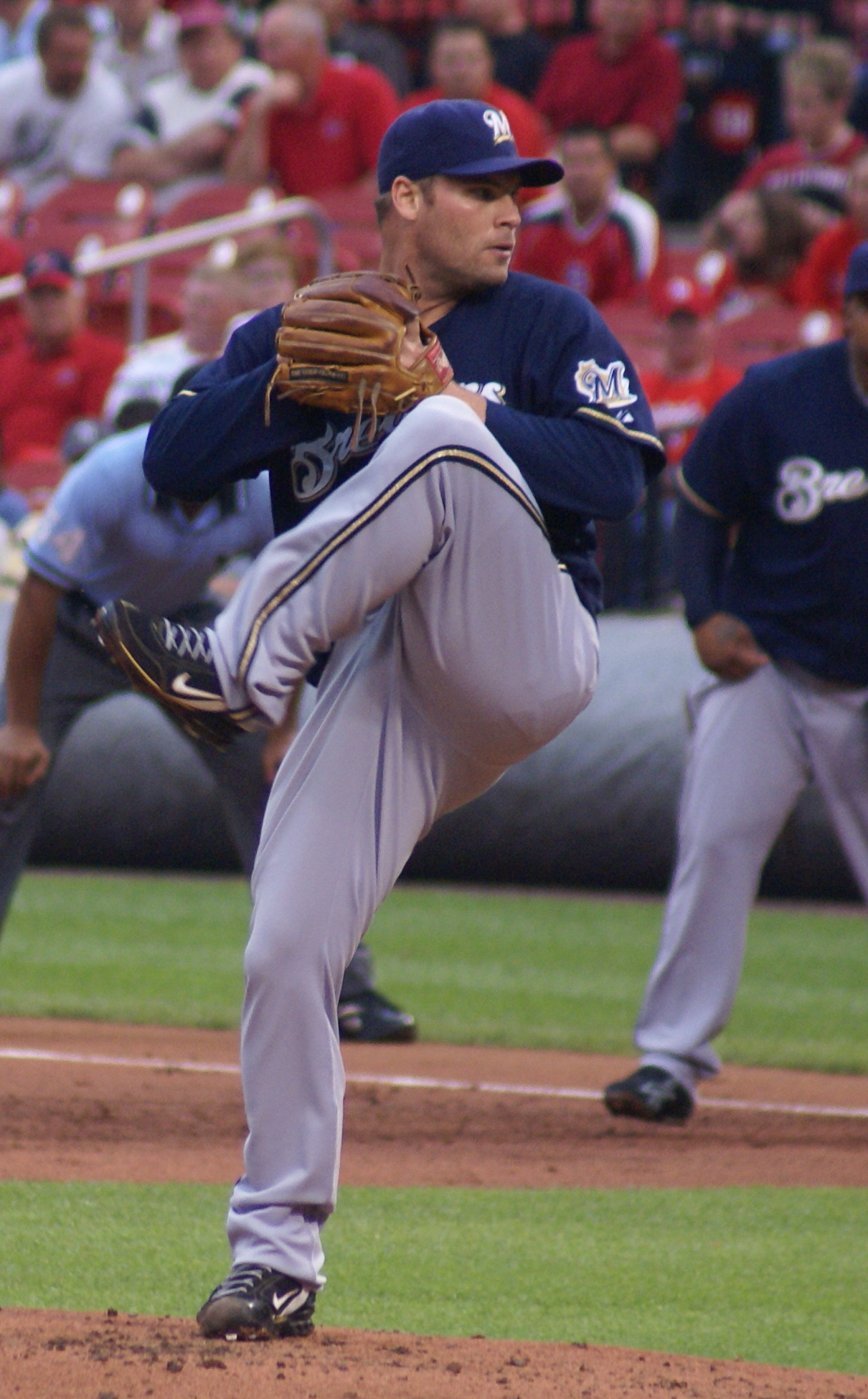
CCBL Hall of Famer Ben Sheets was a 1998 Gateman

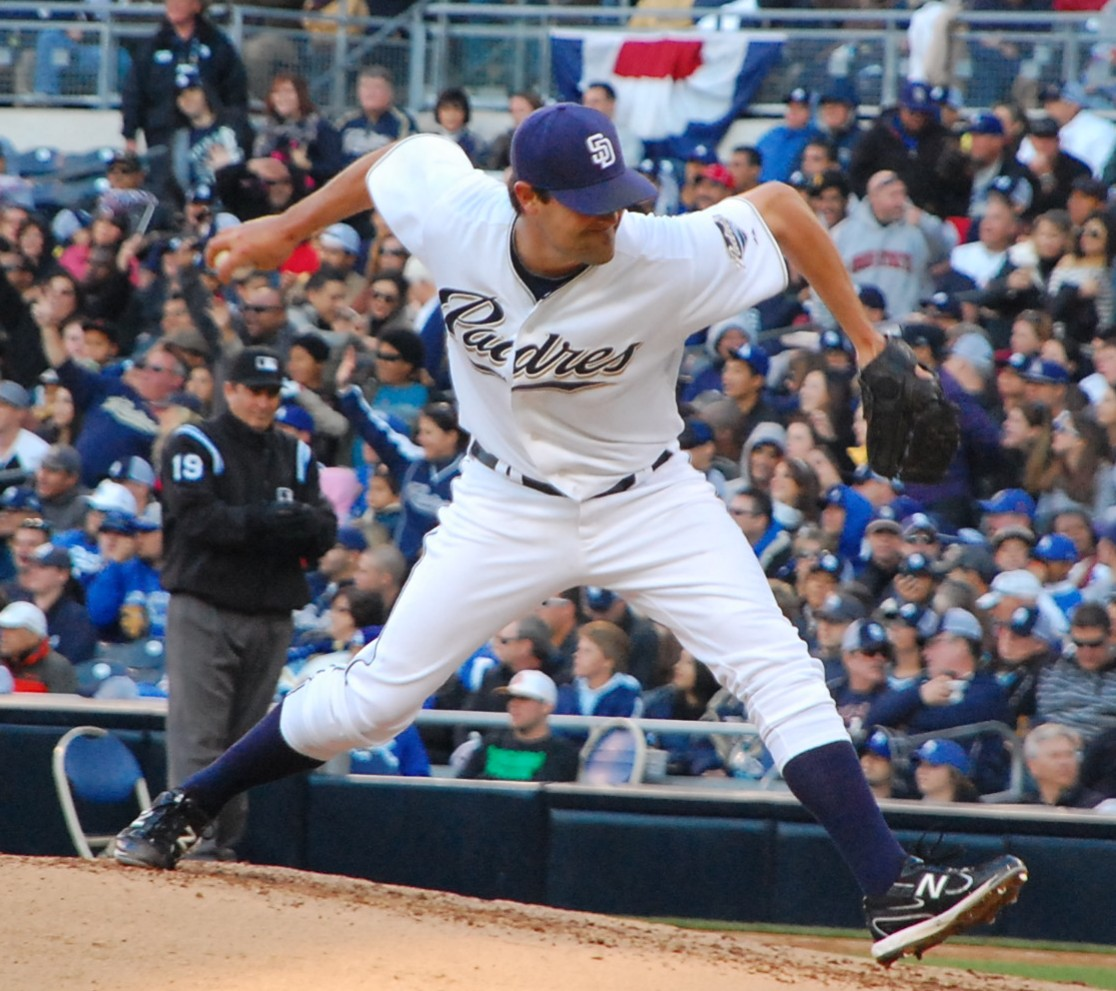
CCBL Hall of Famer Pat Neshek of the 2001 CCBL champion Gatemen

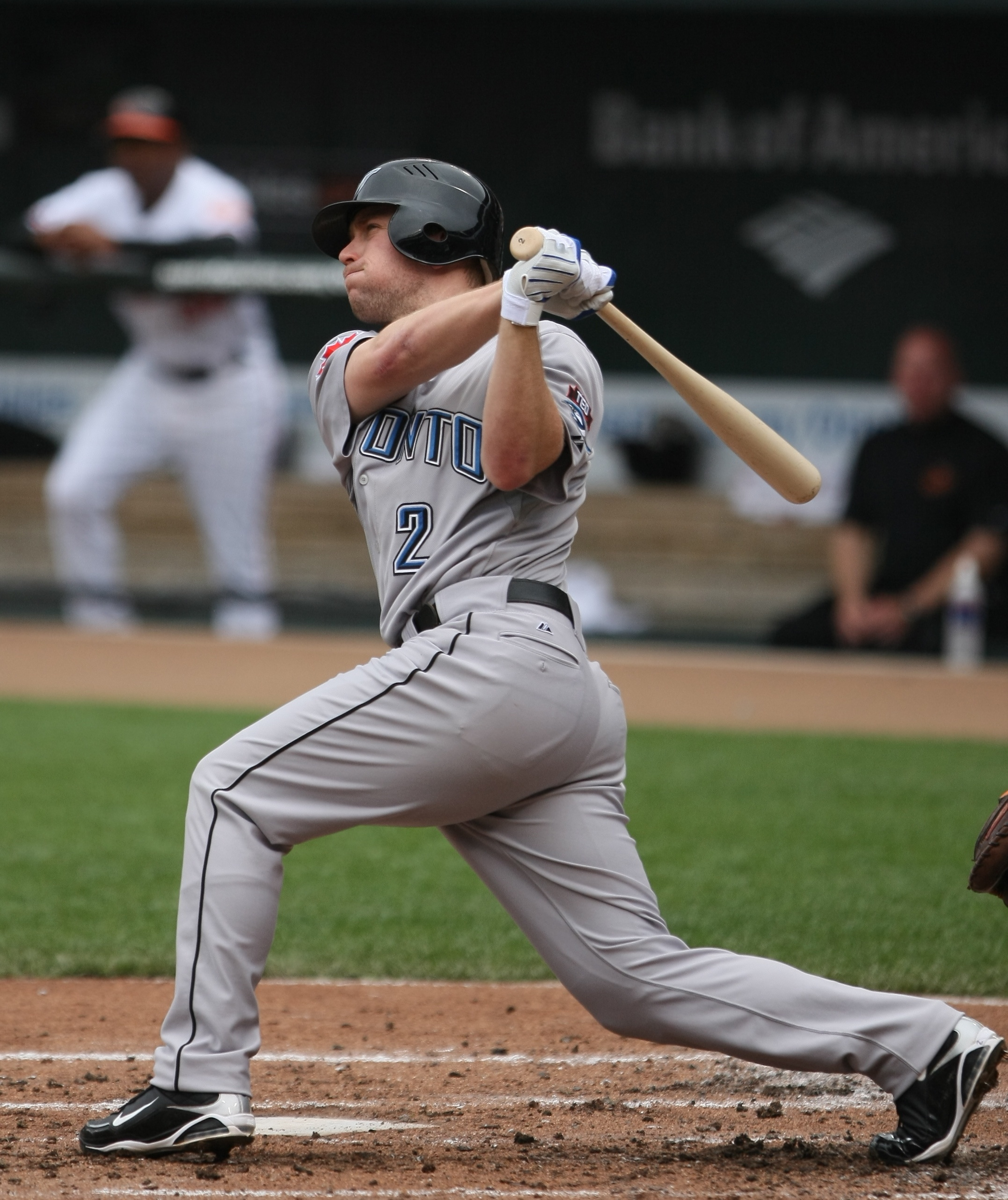
Aaron Hill was playoff MVP for the 2001 CCBL champion Gatemen

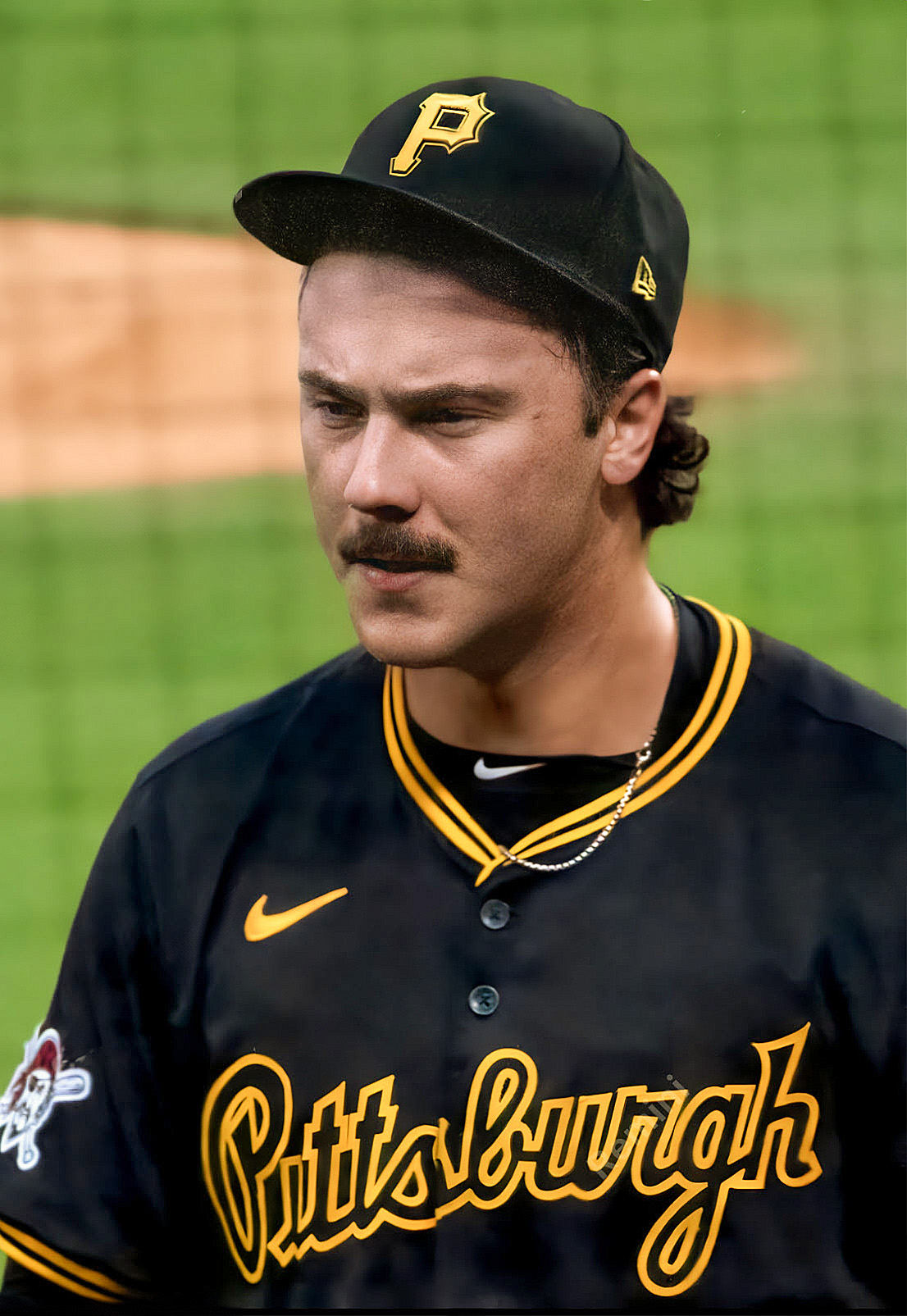
Paul Skenes of the 2021 Wareham Gatemen was selected first overall in the 2023 MLB draft.

=== Results by season, 1927–1932 ===
Year	Won	Lost	Regular Season Finish	Postseason*	Manager	Ref
1927	17	18	3rd League		Danny Silva	
1928	18	26	6th League			
1929	Did not play					
1930	29	15	1st League	Won championship	Harry Noznesky	
1931	23	24	3rd League		Harry Noznesky	
1932	13	21	4th League			

* There were no postseason playoffs during the period 1927–1932. The regular season pennant winner was simply crowned as the league champion.

=== Results by season, 1952–1962 ===
Year	Won	Lost	Regular Season Finish*	Postseason	Manager	Ref
1952						
1953	13	23	T-3rd Upper Cape Division (A); 7th Upper Cape Division (B)		Steve Robbins	
1954	9	20	4th Upper Cape Division (A); 5th Upper Cape Division (B)		Steve Robbins	
1955	22	17	2nd Upper Cape Division (A); 4th Upper Cape Division (B)		Steve Robbins	
1956	23	12	2nd Upper Cape Division	Lost round 1 (Sagamore)	Steve Robbins	
1957	13	17	4th Upper Cape Division	Won round 1 (Otis AFB); Won semi-finals (Cotuit); Lost championship (Orleans)	Steve Robbins	
1958	13	11	2nd Upper Cape Division (A); 3rd Upper Cape Division (B)		Steve Robbins	
1959	16	13	2nd Upper Cape Division (A); 5th Upper Cape Division (B)		Steve Robbins	
1960	13	15	4th Upper Cape Division	Lost round 1 (Cotuit)	Steve Robbins	
1961	12	18	5th Upper Cape Division		Steve Robbins	
1962	16	14	2nd Upper Cape Division (T)	Lost round 1 (Sagamore)	Steve Robbins	

* Regular seasons split into first and second halves are designated as (A) and (B).

=== Results by season, 1963–present ===
Year	Won	Lost	Tied	Regular Season Finish	Postseason	Manager
1963	13	19	0	3rd Upper Cape Division	Won round 1 (Bourne); Lost semi-finals (Cotuit)	Steve Robbins
1964	15	18	0	3rd Upper Cape Division		Steve Robbins
1965	4	28	0	4th Upper Cape Division		Steve Robbins
1966	11	23	0	4th Upper Cape Division		Steve Robbins
1967	12	27	0	3rd Upper Cape Division (T)		Steve Robbins
1968	18	22	0	3rd Upper Cape Division		Bill Thurston
1969	18	26	0	3rd Upper Cape Division		Bill Thurston
1970	25	16	0	1st League (T)	Lost semi-finals (Orleans)	Ed Lyons
1971	23	17	2	3rd League	Lost semi-finals (Orleans)	Ed Lyons
1972	14	26	2	8th League		Ed Lyons
1973	21	19	2	3rd League	Lost semi-finals (Cotuit)	Ed Lyons
1974	23	14	5	1st League	Lost semi-finals (Cotuit)	Ed Lyons
1975	18	23	1	5th League		Ed Lyons
1976	21	18	2	3rd League	Won semi-finals (Cotuit); Won championship (Chatham)	Bill Livesey
1977	20	20	0	4th League	Lost semi-finals (Cotuit)	Bill Livesey
1978	20	22	0	5th League		Demie Mainieri
1979	17	25	0	7th League		Jack Gillis
1980	20	20	2	4th League	Lost semi-finals (Chatham)	Joe Arnold
1981	27	13	2	1st League	Lost semi-finals (Cotuit)	Joe Arnold
1982	29	11	1	1st League	Lost semi-finals (Chatham)	Joe Arnold
1983	26	15	1	2nd League	Lost semi-finals (Harwich)	Joe Arnold
1984	22	17	3	4th League	Won semi-finals (Harwich); Lost championship (Cotuit)	Mike Roberts
1985	19	22	1	5th League		Mark Scalf
1986	22	18	2	3rd League	Lost semi-finals (Cotuit)	Stan Meek
1987	17	25	0	6th League (T)		Bob Pearson
1988	29	13	2	1st West Division	Won semi-finals (Hyannis); Won championship (Orleans)	Stan Meek
1989	21	22	1	4th West Division		Jim Fleming
1990	24	19	1	1st West Division	Won semi-finals (Cotuit); Lost championship (Y-D)	Jim Fleming
1991	30	14	0	1st West Division	Lost semi-finals (Hyannis)	Don Reed
1992	22	20	1	2nd West Division	Lost semi-finals (Cotuit)	Don Reed
1993	25	17	2	1st West Division	Won semi-finals (Hyannis); Lost championship (Orleans)	Don Reed
1994	25	17	1	2nd West Division	Won semi-finals (Falmouth); Won championship (Brewster)	Don Reed
1995	28	15	1	2nd West Division	Lost semi-finals (Cotuit)	Don Reed
1996	29	15	0	1st West Division	Lost semi-finals (Falmouth)	Don Reed
1997	28	16	0	1st West Division	Won semi-finals (Bourne); Won championship (Harwich)	Don Reed
1998	25	18	1	1st West Division	Won semi-finals (Bourne); Lost championship (Chatham)	Don Reed
1999	24	18	2	2nd West Division	Lost semi-finals (Cotuit)	Don Reed
2000	27	16	1	1st West Division	Lost semi-finals (Hyannis)	Mike Roberts
2001	25	18	1	1st West Division	Won semi-finals (Bourne); Won championship (Chatham)	Cooper Farris
2002	23	21	0	2nd West Division	Won semi-finals (Cotuit); Won championship (Orleans)	Cooper Farris
2003	17	25	1	4th West Division		Cooper Farris
2004	20	24	0	4th West Division		Cooper Farris
2005	21	21	2	4th West Division		John Brickley
2006	24	19	1	2nd West Division	Won semi-finals (Cotuit); Lost championship (Y-D)	Cooper Farris
2007	15	29	0	4th West Division		Cooper Farris
2008	17	26	1	5th West Division		Cooper Farris
2009	19	19	6	4th West Division		Cooper Farris
2010	19	24	1	4th West Division	Won round 1 (Bourne); Lost semi-finals (Cotuit)	Cooper Farris
2011	23	21	0	2nd West Division	Won round 1 (Bourne); Lost semi-finals (Falmouth)	Cooper Farris
2012	21	23	0	2nd West Division	Won round 1 (Falmouth); Won semi-finals (Bourne); Won championship (Y-D)	Cooper Farris
2013	9	33	1	5th West Division		Cooper Farris
2014	14	28	2	5th West Division		Cooper Farris
2015	17	25	2	3rd West Division	Lost round 1 (Bourne)	Cooper Farris
2016	25	15	4	2nd West Division	Lost round 1 (Bourne)	Jerry Weinstein
2017	18	25	1	4th West Division	Won round 1 (Falmouth); Lost semi-finals (Bourne)	Don Sneddon
2018	25	17	2	1st West Division	Won round 1 (Cotuit); Won semi-finals (Falmouth); Won championship (Chatham)	Don Sneddon
2019	24	18	2	2nd West Division	Lost round 1 (Cotuit)	Jerry Weinstein
2020	Season cancelled due to coronavirus pandemic					
2021	14	18	5	3rd West Division		Don Sneddon
2022	13	24	7	5th West Division		Harvey Shapiro
2023	15	27	2	5th West Division		Ryan Smyth
2024	22	17	1	2nd West Division (T)	Lost round 1 (Cotuit)	Ryan Smyth
2025	20	20	0	2nd West Division	Lost round 1 (Cotuit)	Ryan Smyth
2026	14	26	0	5th West Division		Ryan Smyth

== League award winners ==
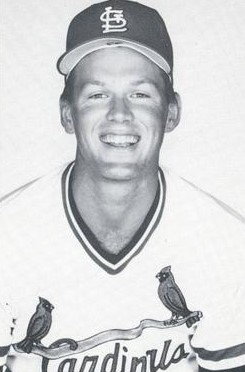
CCBL Hall of Famer John Morris was league MVP in 1981

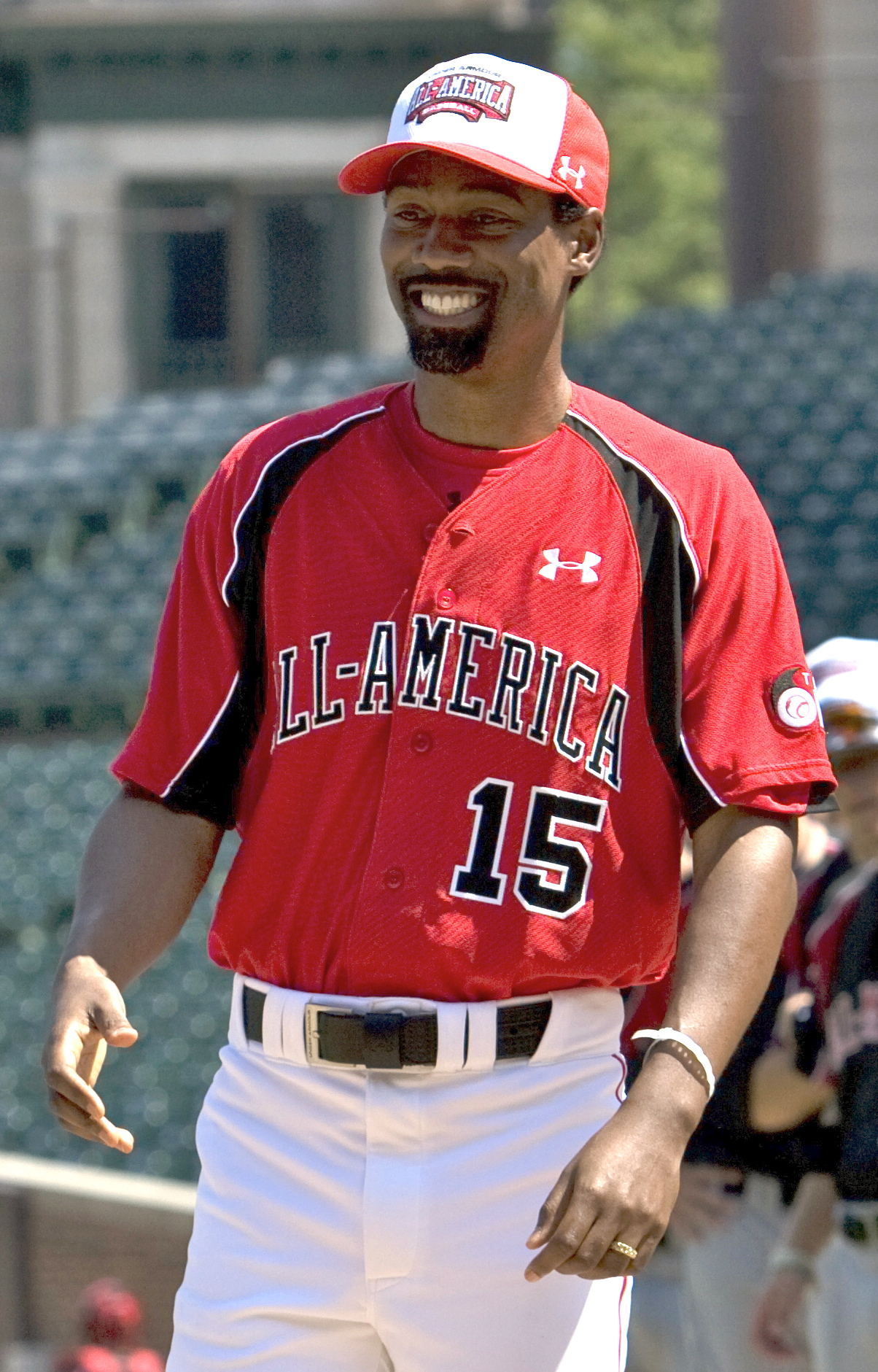
1990 Gateman Doug Glanville was the CCBL Outstanding Pro Prospect

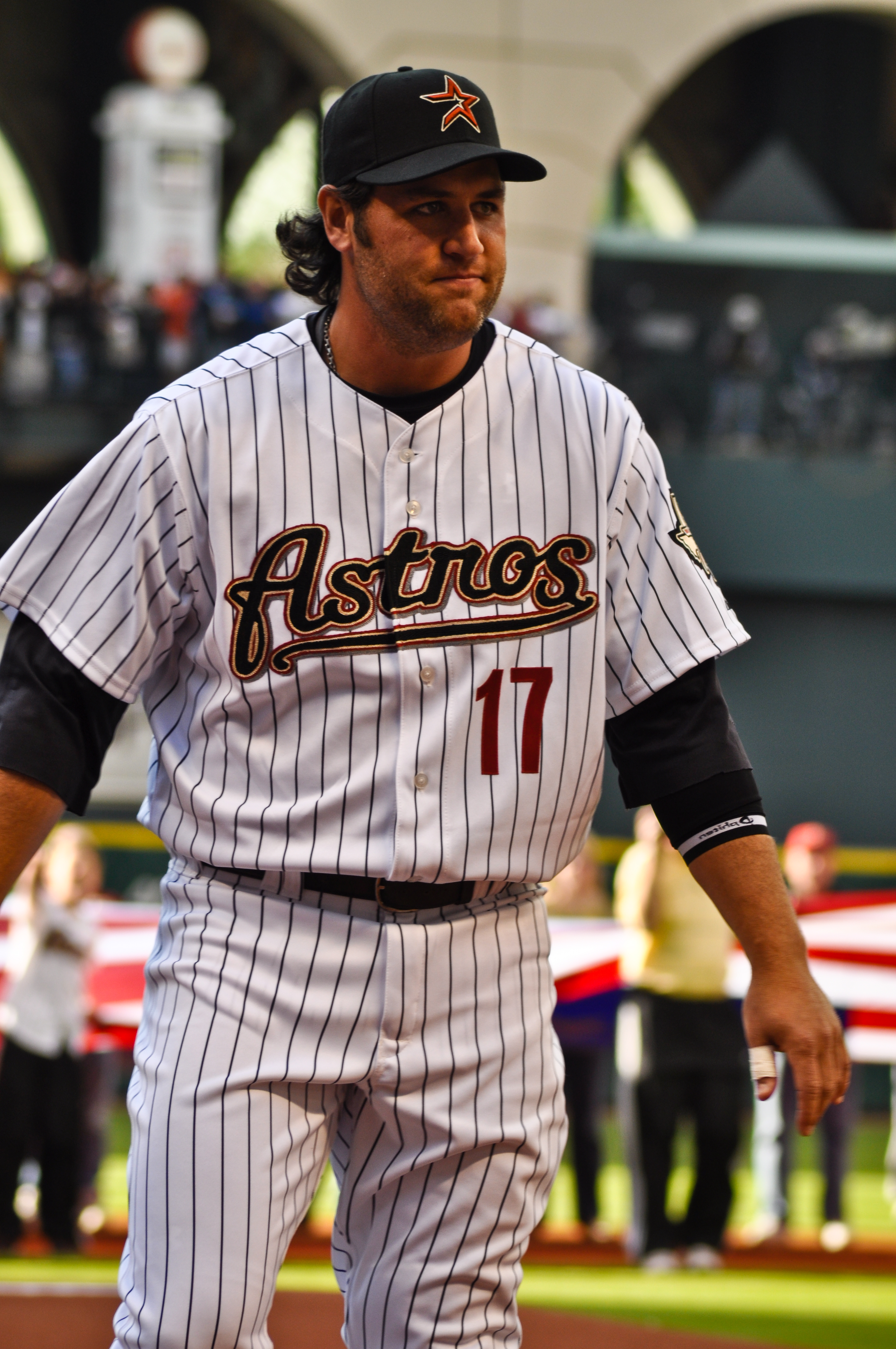
CCBL Hall of Famer Lance Berkman wore the league batting crown in 1996

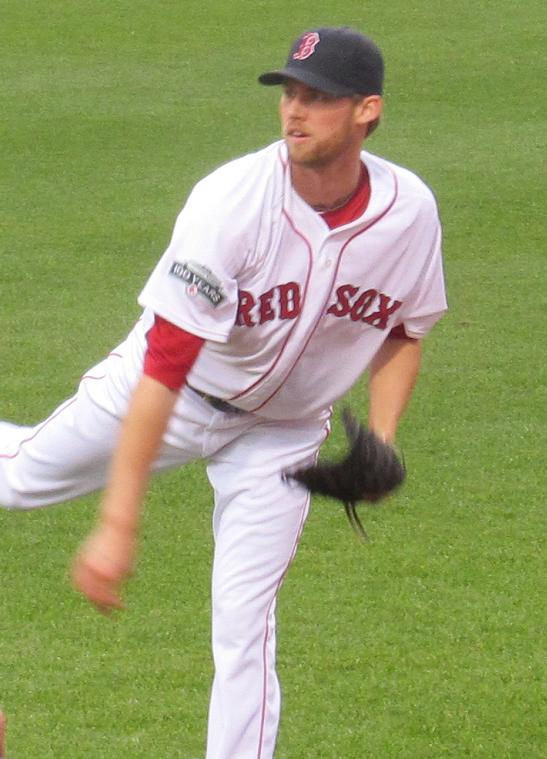
Wareham's Daniel Bard was West Division MVP of the 2005 CCBL all star game

The Pat Sorenti MVP Award
Year	Player
1970	Jim Prete
1971	Joe Barkauskas
1973	Steve Newell
1974	Phil Welch
1981	John Morris
1990	Mark Smith
1996	Kevin Nicholson
1997	Carlos Pena
2000	Mike Fontenot
2001	Matt Murton

The Robert A. McNeece Outstanding Pro Prospect Award
Year	Player
1976	Bobby Sprowl*
1988	Chuck Knoblauch
1990	Doug Glanville
2003	Wade Townsend

The BFC Whitehouse Outstanding Pitcher Award
Year	Player
1971	Bob Majczan
1975	Jerry Hoffman
1977	Karl Steffen
1983	Dennis Livingston
1984	Bill Cunningham
1986	Jack Armstrong
1988	John Thoden
1998	Phil Devey*
1999	Pat Pinkman*
2000	Ben Crockett*
2001	Chris Leonard
2019	Ian Bedell

The Russ Ford Outstanding Relief Pitcher Award
Year	Player
1991	Brad Clontz
1996	Clint Chrysler*
2004	Kevin Whelan

The Daniel J. Silva Sportsmanship Award
Year	Player
1974	Jim Foxwell
1979	John McDonald*
1981	Gary Melillo*
1985	Dan Arendas*
1987	Mike Hensley
1994	Karl Thompson
1997	Carlos Pena
2005	Joel Collins

The Manny Robello 10th Player Award
Year	Player
1991	Jack Stanczak
2024	Yohann Dessureault

The John J. Claffey Outstanding New England Player Award
Year	Player
2001	Ben Crockett
2012	Tyler Horan

The Thurman Munson Award for Batting Champion
Year	Player
1988	Chuck Knoblauch (.361)
1990	Mark Smith (.408)
1991	Mike Hickey (.366)
1996	Lance Berkman (.352)
1999	Jaime Bubela (.370)
2001	Eric Reed (.365)
2015	Andrew Calica (.425)
2016	Cole Freeman (.374)
2017	Tanner Dodson (.350)

All-Star Game MVP Award
Year	Player
1986	Jack Armstrong
1990	Mark Smith
1993	Roy Marsh
1996	Kevin Nicholson
2001	Matt Murton
2005	Daniel Bard
2010	Zach Wilson
2011	Konner Wade
2012	Daniel Palka
2015	Ian Hamilton*
2019	Matt McLain

All-Star Home Run Hitting Contest Champion
Year	Player
2002	Matt Murton
2007	Luke Murton
2015	Logan Sowers

The Star of Stars Playoff MVP Award
Year	Player
1988	John Thoden*
1988	Mo Vaughn*
1994	Chris Boni
1997	Kevin Hodge
2001	Aaron Hill
2002	Matt Kutler
2012	Kyle Schwarber
2018	Austin Shenton

(*) - Indicates co-recipient

== All-Star Game selections ==
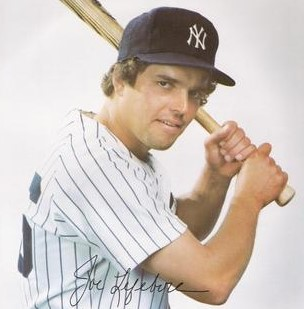
Joe Lefebvre was an all-star on Wareham's 1976 league championship club.

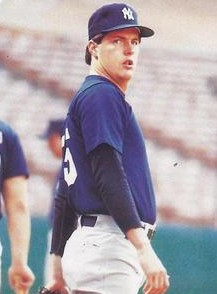
1979 Gateman all-star Bob Tewksbury

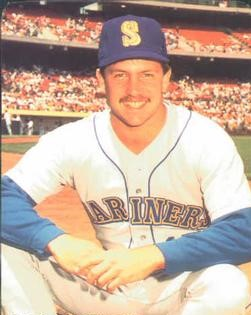
1982 and 1983 CCBL all-star Scott Bankhead

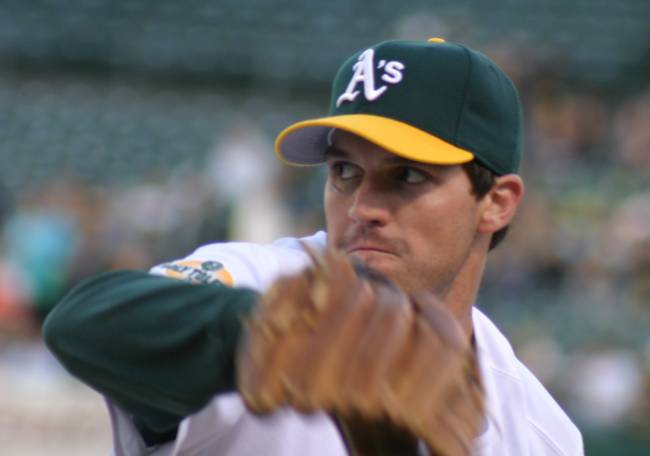
Barry Zito pitched for the 1997 CCBL champion Gatemen, and was a league all-star in 1998.

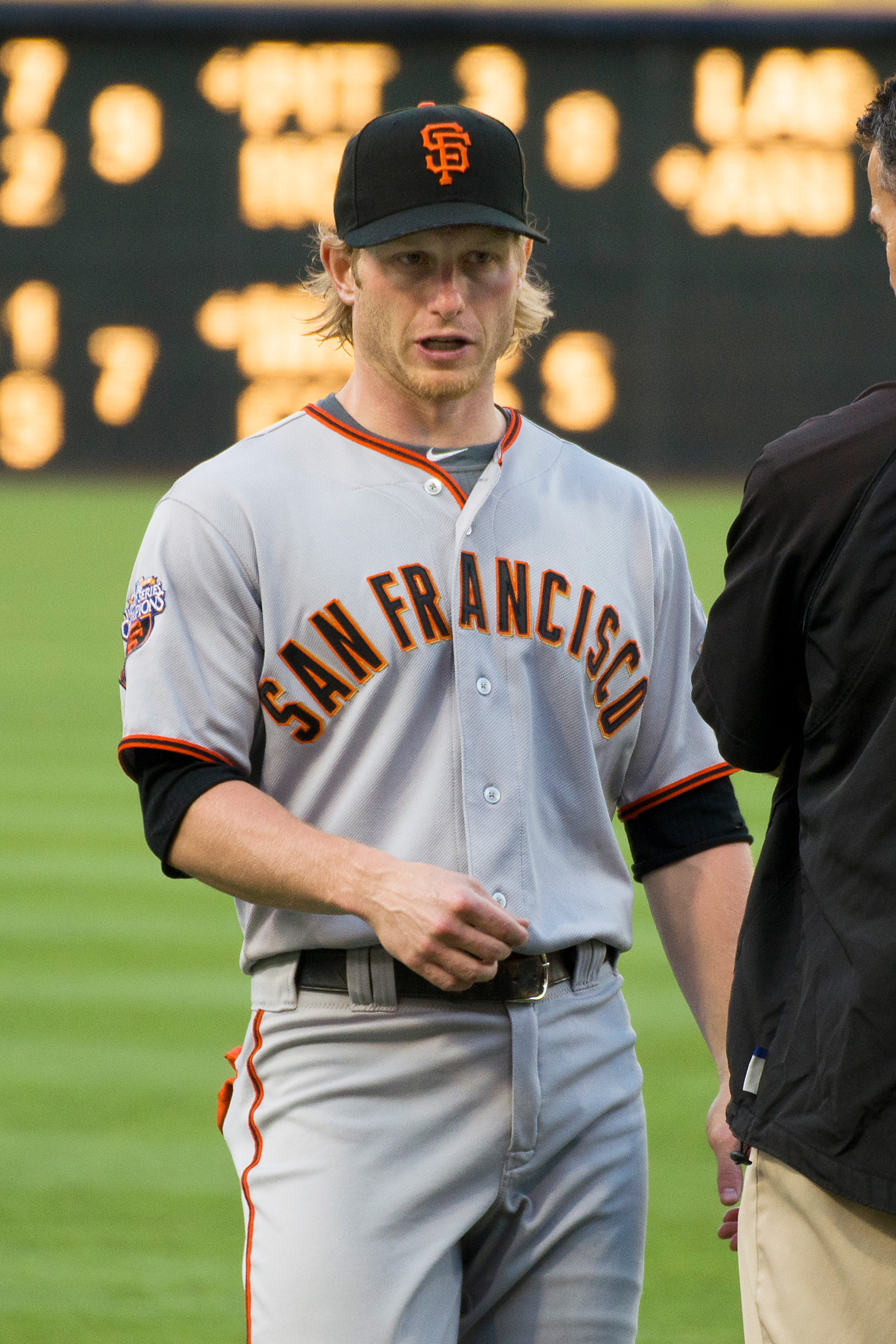
Gateman Mike Fontenot was an all-star and the league MVP in 2000.

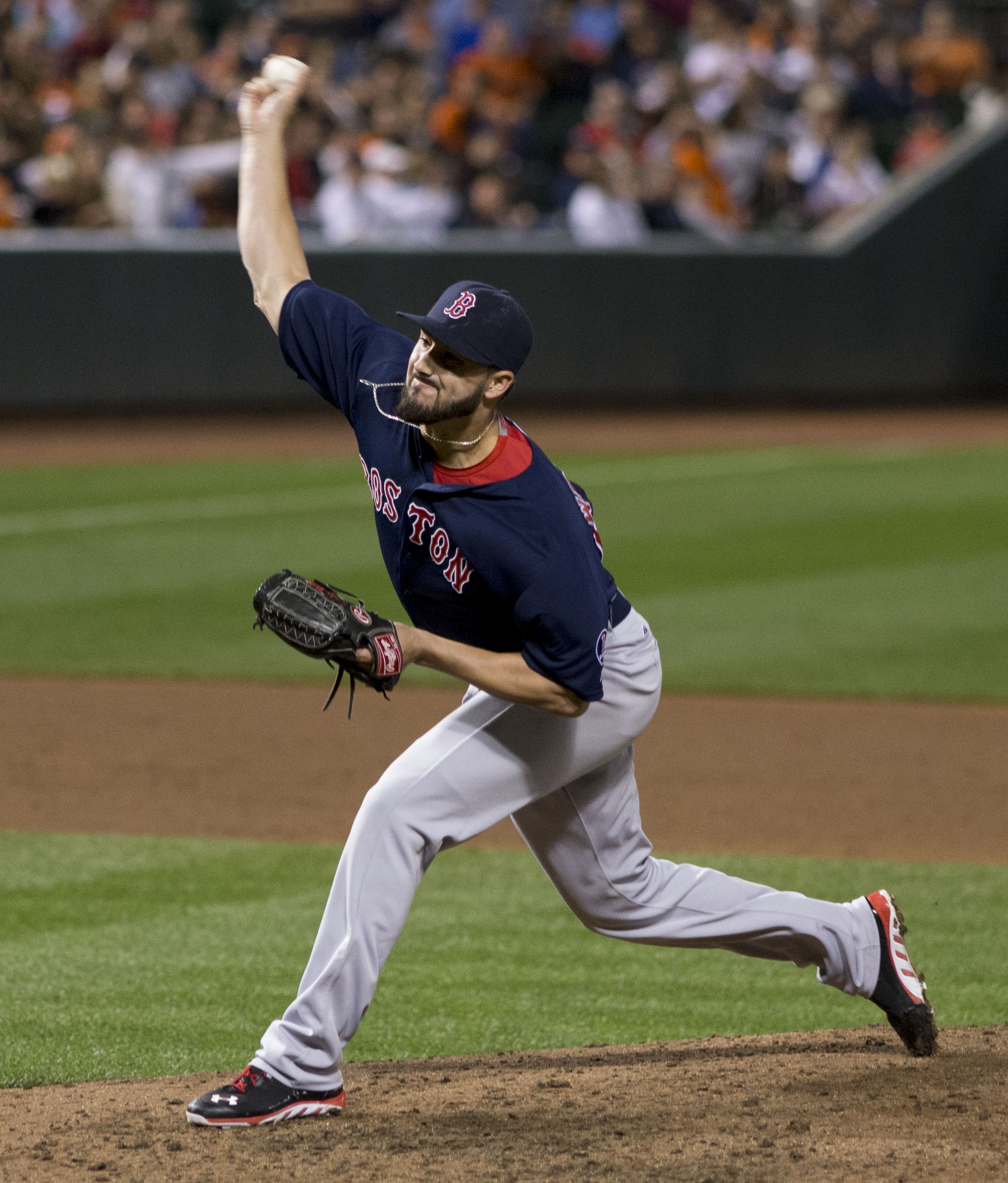
Brandon Workman was a Gatemen all-star in 2008 and 2009.

Year	Players	Ref
1963	Gerald Cunniff, Richie Braley	
1964	Don Gagner, William Contreras, Andrew Gomes, Edwin Monteiro	
1965	Gerald Cuniff	
1966	Jim Prete, Ted Mareno, Ed Waters	
1967	Jim Prete, Ted Mareno	
1968	Bob Jones, Tom Collins, Dave Cichon, Ed Bravo	
1969	Bob Jones, Barry Roderick, Ed Mahoney, Rick Konik, Gary Caffrey	
1970	Jim Prete, Atlas Jones	
1971	Gene Kryzk, Tom Boettcher, Joe Barkauskas, Joe Chiaramonte, Bob Majczan	
1972	Roswell Brayton	
1973	Lin Hamilton, Steve Newell, Terry Farmer	
1974	Jim Foxwell	
1975	Ed Rose	
1976	Bobby Sprowl, Mike Pustay, Greg Biercevicz, Joe Lefebvre, Tom Bonfield, John Long	
1977	Bob Hamilton, George Ravinas, Karl Steffen, Dave Bertulli	
1978	Ron Dixon, Paul Mainieri	
1979	Bob Tewksbury, Jim D'Aloia	
1980	Bob Gendron, John Weller	
1981	Kurt Kaull, Scott Tabor, Gerry Melillo, John Morris, Steve Stanicek, Ron Sismondo, Steve Gehrke	
1982	Dennis Livingston, Scott Bankhead, Kurt Kaull, Robbie Wine, Mike Lopez, Dave Dyrek, Carey Ross, Jeff Parrett	
1983	Dennis Livingston, Scott Bankhead, Don Samra, Jay Searcy, Bill Cunningham	
1984	Walt Weiss, Jay Nieporte	
1985	Dan Arendas	
1986	Billy Rapp, Jack Armstrong	
1987	Brian Johnson, Brian Cisarik, Jay Knoblauh	
1988	Darron Cox, John Thoden, Pat Leinen, Mo Vaughn, Jody Hurst, Chuck Knoblauch	
1989	Brian Raabe, Jalal Leach, Bob Baxter, Jim Richardson, Tim Flannelly	
1990	Doug Glanville, Brad Woodall, Tom Carter, Brett Jenkins, Mark Smith	
1991	Wes Weger, Michael Moore, Mike Hickey, Casey Whitten, Brad Clontz, Aaron Dorlarque	
1992	Aaron Iatarola, Scott Brocail, Scott Speizio	
1993	Troy Brohawn, Tommy Davis, Roy Marsh, Rich Hills, Brett Boretti, Steve Stapleton	
1994	Karl Thompson, Jared Janke, Marty Crawford, Kevan Cannon, Nelson Figueroa, Tony Eannacony	
1995	Reggie Davis, Travis Young, Pat Daneker, Jeff Sebring	
1996	Brian Benefield, Kevin Nicholson, Justin Fry, Clint Chrysler	
1997	David Noyce, Carlos Peña, Kevin Hodge, Ned French	
1998	Shawn Stevenson, Phil Devey, Ben Sheets, Barry Zito	
1999	Casey Lambert, Jaime Bubela, Phil Hartig, Pat Pinkman, Scott Walter, Logan Dale, Brion Treadway	
2000	Tyler Parker, Ben Crockett, Mike Fontenot, Ryan Theriot, Mike Prochaska	
2001	Tyler Parker, Ben Crockett, Aaron Hill, Eric Reed, Chris Leonard, Matt Murton	
2002	David Murphy, Matt Rogelstad, David Sanders, Kevin Guyette, Matt Murton	
2003	Warner Jones, Andy LaRoche, Jeremy Sowers, Jon Armitage	
2004	Warner Jones, Chris Gutierrez, Robert Ray, Mark McCormack, Kevin Whelan	
2005	Joel Collins, Lance Salsgiver, Daniel Bard, Whit Robbins, Justin Masterson, John Lalor, Wade LeBlanc, Josh Copeland	
2006	Joel Collins, Jeremy Bleich, Travis Banwart, Connor Graham, Steffan Wilson	
2007	Josh Phegley, Wade Miley, Chris Hicks, Luke Murton, Blake Dean	
2008	Brandon Workman, Raynor Campbell, Dallas Keuchel, Blake Dean	
2009	Brandon Workman, Derek Dietrich, Jack Armstrong, Eric Pfisterer, Brett Eibner	
2010	Tyler Bream, Zach Wilson, Tony Caldwell, Max Perlman, Jed Bradley, Jake Davies	
2011	Konner Wade, Max Muncy, John Andreoli, Daniel Palka	
2012	Konner Wade, Daniel Palka, Mott Hyde, Tyler Ross, Colby Suggs, Nick Rumbelow, Tyler Horan	
2013	Tino Lipson, Ethan Gross, Cole Sturgeon, Bradley Roney	
2014	Kramer Robertson, Chris Chinea, Kyle Cody, Keaton Aldridge, Scott Effross, Kyri Washington	
2015	Nick Cieri, Andrew Calica, Blake Fox, David MacKinnon, Charlie Warren, Evan Hill, Ian Hamilton, Logan Sowers	
2016	Cole Freeman, Robert Metz, Joey Bart, Gunner Leger, Colton Shaver	
2017	Justin Montgomery, Willie MacIver, Tanner Dodson, Kyle Kasser, John Toppa, Griffin Roberts, Tristan Pompey	
2018	Austin Shenton, Sahid Valenzuela, Jeremy Ydens, Ryan Garcia, Easton Lucas, Bryant Packard	
2019	Dallas Beaver, Jacob Teter, Braiden Ward, Ian Bedell, Trent Palmer, Darren Baker, Benjamin Sems, Matt McLain	
2020	Season cancelled due to coronavirus pandemic	
2021	Jimmy Crooks, Owen Diodati, Tommy Troy, Hunter Schilperoort, Garrett Schmeltz	
2022	Hogan Windish, Ryan Campos, Max Anderson, Kellum Clark, Michael Sansone, Grayson Moore	
2023	Bobby Boser, Garen Caulfield, Jake Faherty, Grant Hussey, Will Koger, Nick McLain, Rene Lastres	
2024	Yohann Dessureault, Jacob Faulkner, Triston Gray, Tate McGuire, Tony Pluta, Brendan Summerhill, Sam White, Reese Chapman, Nate Earley	
2025	Kaleb Applebey, Josh Butler, Hunter Carns, Chase Krewson, Colby Turner, Easton Breyfogle	
2026	Ethan Baiotto, Mark Brissey, Levi Clark, RJ Hamilton, Coen Niclai	

Italics - Indicates All-Star Game Home Run Hitting Contest participant (1988 to present)

== No-hit games ==
Year	Pitcher	Opponent	Score	Location	Notes	Ref
1959	Bruce Reed	Barnstable	4–0			
1961	Johnny Coburn	Maritime	6–0	Clem Spillane Field		
1964	Don Gagner	Otis AFB	24–0	Otis AFB		

== Managerial history ==
Manager	Seasons	Total Seasons	Championship Seasons
Steve Robbins	1953–1967	15	
Bill Thurston	1968–1969	2	
Ed Lyons	1970–1975	6	
Bill Livesey	1976–1977	2	1976
Demie Mainieri	1978	1	
Jack Gillis	1979	1	
Joe Arnold	1980–1983	4	
Mark Scalf	1985	1	
Bob Pearson	1987	1	
Stan Meek	1986; 1988	2	1988
Jim Fleming	1989–1990	2	
Don Reed	1991–1999	9	1994, 1997
Mike Roberts	1984; 2000	2	
John Brickley	2005	1	
Cooper Farris	2001–2004; 2006–2015	14	2001, 2002, 2012
Jerry Weinstein	2016; 2019	2	
Don Sneddon	2017–2018; 2021	3	2018
Harvey Shapiro	2022	1	
Ryan Smyth	2023–2026	4	

== Media ==
All 40 Gatemen games, in addition to any preseason and postseason games, are broadcast online on YouTube and Cape League TV, which can be accessed through the Gatemen's website. All home games feature live video/audio broadcasts, while away games consist of only live audio. The Gatemen play-by-play broadcasters for the 2024 season are Ethan Eibe and Kyle Marchak.

The New Bedford Standard Times ("SouthCoastToday"), The Cape Cod Times and Wareham Week (warehamweektoday.com) cover the Wareham Gatemen regularly.

== See also ==
- Wareham Gatemen players
