= Demie Mainieri =

American baseball coach (1928–2019)

Biographical details
- Born: October 21, 1928
- Died: March 13, 2019 (aged 90)

Accomplishments and honors

Awards
- NJCAA Hall of Fame (1983)
- College Baseball Hall of Fame; Inducted in 2014

Demie J. Mainieri (October 21, 1928 – March 13, 2019) was an American college baseball head coach who was the first junior college coach to win 1,000 career games.

== Biography ==
Mainieri was from Jersey City, New Jersey and attended Lincoln High School. He graduated from West Virginia University in 1963 with a Ph.D. in education and administration. He served as an assistant coach in college football at Columbia University under head coach Lou Little.

Mainieri served as the head coach of the college baseball team at Miami Dade Community College for thirty years, starting in 1960. He was named athletic director in 1963. Mainieri became the first junior college coach to win 1,000 career games. Mainieri won 1,012 games at Miami-Dade.

In 1978, Mainieri skippered the Wareham Gatemen of the Cape Cod Baseball League.

Mainieri's son, Paul Mainieri, was the head coach for the LSU Tigers baseball team from 2007 until his retirement at the conclusion of the 2021 season.

Mainieri was inducted into the NJCAA Hall of Fame in 1983. In 2014, Mainieri was elected into the National College Baseball Hall of Fame.

On March 13, 2019, Mainieri died at the age of 90.
