= Australia national baseball team at the Summer Olympics =

The Australia national baseball team was the third nation, after the United States and Sweden, to participate in baseball at the Summer Olympics, making their first appearance at the 1956 Games in Melbourne, and again as part of its demonstration at the 1988 Games in Seoul.

Since baseball was first included as a medal sport at the 1992 Games in Barcelona, Australia has participated in three of the five tournaments. The best result achieved was in the 2004 Games in Athens, where Australia lost the gold medal match to Cuba to receive silver. Their medal tally puts them at 5th, equal to Chinese Taipei. (Note: The 5th placed ranking is based both on the most medals received in total, and on the most gold medals, then silver, then bronze.)

Australia is the only country to have hosted an Olympic baseball tournament as a medal sport, won an Olympic medal, and done so in separate years: hosted in 2000, won silver in 2004. Australia is also one of only two countries—the other being the United States—to have hosted baseball events as both a non-medal and medal sport.

== Summer Olympics record ==
Summer Olympics record								Qualification
Year	Round	Position	W	L	%	RS	RA	Qualification
(Australia) 1956	Exhibition only		0	1	.000	5	11	No qualifiers held
(South Korea) 1988	Preliminary	5th (tie)	1	2	.333	10	20	Invited (Note: Cuba originally qualified but withdrew as a result of its boycott; Nicaragua, Mexico and Italy had senior rights, but were unable to field a team on short notice.)
(Spain) 1992	Did not qualify							Did not qualify
(United States) 1996	Preliminary	7th	2	5	.286	47	86	Oceania Baseball Championship; defeated Africa Cup Champion
(Australia) 2000	Preliminary	7th	2	5	.286	30	41	Qualified as hosts
(Greece) 2004	Finals	2nd	5	4	.556	52	36	Oceania Baseball Championship; defeated Africa Cup Champion
(China) 2008	Did not qualify							Did not qualify
(Japan) 2020	Did not qualify							Withdrew from qualifying tournament
Total (Note: Totals only include years 1992 to 2008, during which baseball was an official medal sport.)	Finals	3/6	9	14	.391	129	163	

== Melbourne, 1956 ==
In 1956, two demonstration sports were allowed: a sport from the host nation and a foreign sport—Australian rules football and baseball respectively. Rather than the tournaments that would be played at future Games while still a demonstration sport, a single match was played against a team representing the United States selected from the U.S. Far East Command, on 1 December 1956, at the Melbourne Cricket Ground.

Though many of the 114,000 people who attended were believed to be attending in anticipation of the athletics events to be held that afternoon, until an exhibition game played at the Los Angeles Memorial Coliseum in 2008 between the Los Angeles Dodgers and the Boston Red Sox, it had the largest attendance for a baseball game ever. Even with this distinctive home-ground advantage, the Australians were unable to win, losing 11–5 in six innings.

1956 Olympic Results

1 December 12:30 (UTC+11) at (Australia) Melbourne Cricket Ground
Team	1	2	3	4	5	6	R
United States	2	0	4	0	2	3	11
Australia	0	1	0	0	1	3	5
Home runs: (United States) : Vane Sutton (1) (Australia) : Norman White (1); Attendance: 114,000; Boxscore

== Seoul, 1988 ==
1988 was the last time that baseball was included as an Olympic sport without medal status, and was the second time that Australia participated at the Olympic level. Though not originally included in the eight team tournament, Australia joined Canada, Chinese Taipei, Japan, the Netherlands, Puerto Rico, South Korea and the United States after Cuba chose to boycott the Games. Australia was pooled with Canada, South Korea and the United States, but failed to qualify for the finals.

1988 Olympic Results

19 September at (South Korea) Jamsil Baseball Stadium
Team	1	2	3	4	5	6	7	8	9	R	H
Canada	0	0	3	0	0	0	3	0	0	6	12
Australia	2	0	2	3	0	0	0	0	X	7	10
Boxscore

21 September at (South Korea) Jamsil Baseball Stadium (F/7)
Team	1	2	3	4	5	6	7	8	9	R	H
Australia	0	0	0	0	0	0	2			2	3
United States	2	0	1	0	1	0	8			12	15
Boxscore

23 September at (South Korea) Jamsil Baseball Stadium (F/10)
Team	1	2	3	4	5	6	7	8	9	X	R	H
Australia	0	0	1	0	0	0	0	0	0	0	1	6
South Korea	0	1	0	0	0	0	0	0	0	0	2	7
Boxscore

== Atlanta, 1996 ==
Prior to the Games proper, Australia had to qualify to compete in the baseball tournament. After the host nation automatically qualifying, two spots were available each to European, American and Asian teams, while the final spot was available to the winner of a playoff between the Oceania Champions and the African Champions. Australia won this contest, depriving South Africa of its first opportunity to compete in Olympic baseball.

Australia became the tenth nation to compete for an Olympic medal in baseball, when they played Cuba in the opening game of their 1996 campaign. This game set the record for the most runs scored in an Olympic baseball match—a record that stood through to the final Olympic tournament in 2008 Beijing Games in Beijing—with the two teams combining to score 27 runs, Cuba winning 19–8. The previous record was set at the 1992 Barcelona Games, when Chinese Taipei defeated hosts Spain 20–0.

After losing their first two mercy rule shortened games to Cuba and the Netherlands, Australia recorded their first victory against defending bronze-medalists Japan. Australia won only one of their remaining four games (against South Korea), which included two more mercy-rule losses to the United States and Nicaragua. They finished the preliminary stage seventh, ahead of South Korea.

Though it has been equaled since, the loss to Cuba in the first game remains the largest defeat Australia has suffered in Olympic baseball.

1996 Olympic Results

20 July at (United States) Atlanta–Fulton County Stadium (F/8)
Team	1	2	3	4	5	6	7	8	9	R	H	E
Cuba	2	0	3	3	0	8	0	3		19	20	2
Australia	0	4	0	4	0	0	0	0		8	12	5
WP: Eliecer Montes de Oca (1–0) LP: Michael Nakamura (0–1) Sv: José Contreras (1); Boxscore

22 July at (United States) Atlanta–Fulton County Stadium (F/8)
Team	1	2	3	4	5	6	7	8	9	R	H	E
Netherlands	8	2	0	0	0	4	0	2		16	18	1
Australia	0	2	0	0	0	4	0	0		6	7	2
WP: Rob Cordemans (1–0) LP: Simon Sheldon-Collins (0–1); Boxscore

23 July at (United States) Atlanta–Fulton County Stadium
Team	1	2	3	4	5	6	7	8	9	R	H	E
Australia	0	1	0	0	1	7	0	0	0	9	14	0
Japan	2	0	0	0	0	1	0	0	3	6	11	3
WP: Jeff Williams (1–0) LP: Takeo Kawamura (0–1) Sv: Andrew McNally (1); Boxscore

25 July at (United States) Atlanta–Fulton County Stadium
Team	1	2	3	4	5	6	7	8	9	R	H	E
Italy	3	2	2	2	2	0	0	1	0	12	15	3
Australia	0	2	1	2	1	0	0	2	0	8	12	3
WP: Roberto Cabalisti (2–0) LP: Michael Nakamura (0–2) Sv: Paolo Ceccaroli (1); Boxscore

27 July at (United States) Atlanta–Fulton County Stadium (F/7)
Team	1	2	3	4	5	6	7	8	9	R	H	E
Australia	1	2	2	0	0	0	0			5	9	1
United States	7	0	2	6	0	0	X			15	13	0
WP: Seth Greisinger (2–0) LP: Andrew McNally (0–1); Boxscore

28 July at (United States) Atlanta–Fulton County Stadium (F/8)
Team	1	2	3	4	5	6	7	8	9	R	H	E
Australia	0	0	0	0	0	0	0	0		0	5	2
Nicaragua	0	3	1	1	0	0	0	5		10	13	0
WP: Jose Luis Quiroz (2–0) LP: Jeff Williams (1–1); Boxscore

30 July at (United States) Atlanta–Fulton County Stadium
Team	1	2	3	4	5	6	7	8	9	R	H	E
Australia	0	0	0	8	0	0	1	2	0	11	14	2
South Korea	2	2	3	0	0	0	1	0	0	8	10	3
WP: Shane Tonkin (1–0) LP: Jeon Seung-Nam (0–2); Boxscore

== Sydney, 2000 ==
Having hosted and won gold in the 1999 Intercontinental Cup ten months prior, with only one loss in the whole competition—including two victories over powerhouse Cuba—there were great expectations for Australia to perform in front of home crowds again in the 2000 Sydney Olympics. Despite virtually the same line-up of teams (South Africa qualified for the Games while Chinese Taipei did not) Australia could only manage two victories during the round-robin phase against South Korea and South Africa.

The loss to the United States in Australia's final game of the tournament equalled the largest loss they'd suffered in Olympic competition four years previously at the hands of Cuba.

2000 Olympic Results

17 September 19:30 (UTC+11) at (Australia) Sydney Baseball Stadium
Team	1	2	3	4	5	6	7	8	9	R	H	E
Netherlands	0	0	4	0	0	2	0	0	0	6	11	2
Australia	0	1	0	0	0	2	0	1	0	4	8	2
WP: Jurriaan Lobbezoo (1–0) LP: Shayne Bennett (0–1) Sv: Ferenc Jongejan (1); Home runs: (Netherlands) : Sharnol Adriana (1) (Australia) : Glenn Reeves (1), Paul Gonzalez (1); Attendance: 13,762; Boxscore

18 September 12:30 (UTC+11) at (Australia) Sydney Baseball Stadium
Team	1	2	3	4	5	6	7	8	9	R	H	E
Australia	1	1	0	0	0	0	1	2	0	5	11	0
South Korea	1	1	0	1	0	0	0	0	0	3	7	0
WP: Craig Anderson (1–0) LP: Song Jin-Woo (0–1) Sv: Grant Balfour (1); Attendance: 13,281; Boxscore

19 September 12:30 (UTC+11) at (Australia) Sydney Baseball Stadium
Team	1	2	3	4	5	6	7	8	9	R	H	E
Japan	1	0	0	0	2	4	0	0	0	7	10	1
Australia	0	0	3	0	0	0	0	0	0	3	6	0
WP: Tomohiro Kuroki (1–0) LP: Mark Ettles (0–1); Home runs: (Japan) : Yoshinori Okihara (1) (Australia) : Dave Nilsson (1); Attendance: 13,903; Boxscore

20 September 18:30 (UTC+11) at (Australia) Blacktown Olympic Park
Team	1	2	3	4	5	6	7	8	9	R	H	E
Australia	1	0	0	0	0	4	0	4	1	10	10	2
South Africa	0	0	0	1	0	2	0	1	0	4	8	0
WP: Adrian Meagher (1–0) LP: Glen Morris (0–1); Home runs: (Australia) : Paul Gonzalez (2) (South Africa) : Jason Cook (1); Attendance: 3,459; Boxscore

22 September 12:30 (UTC+11) at (Australia) Sydney Baseball Stadium
Team	1	2	3	4	5	6	7	8	9	R	H	E
Australia	0	0	0	0	0	0	0	0	0	0	3	1
Cuba	0	0	1	0	0	0	0	0	X	1	9	0
WP: José Contreras (1–0) LP: Shayne Bennett (0–2); Attendance: 14,036; Boxscore

23 September 18:30 (UTC+11) at (Australia) Blacktown Olympic Park (F/12)
Team	1	2	3	4	5	6	7	8	9	X	R	H	E
Italy	0	0	1	0	0	0	2	1	2	2	8	16	2
Australia	0	0	0	0	1	4	0	1	0	1	7	10	2
WP: Marc Cerbone (1–0) LP: Craig Anderson (1–1) Sv: Fabio Betto (1); Home runs: (Italy) : Christopher Madonna (1), Luigi Carrozza (1) (Australia) : Grant McDonald (1); Attendance: 3,562; Boxscore

24 September 19:30 (UTC+11) at (Australia) Sydney Baseball Stadium (F/7)
Team	1	2	3	4	5	6	7	8	9	R	H	E
United States	0	4	1	5	0	1	1			12	14	0
Australia	0	0	0	1	0	0	0			1	7	2
WP: Kurt Ainsworth (2–0) LP: Mark Hutton (0–1); Home runs: (United States) : Marcus Jensen (1) (Australia) : None; Attendance: 14,018; Boxscore

== Athens, 2004 ==
=== Qualifying ===
As had been the case in the previous Olympics, Oceania and Africa teams first had to become champions of their respective continents before facing in a deciding series to determine the last of eight spots available. For the third successive Olympic Games, South Africa represented Africa, having won the gold medal at the 2003 All-Africa Games. Australia was scheduled to compete against Guam in the 2004 Oceania Baseball Championship, with the winner advancing to the playoff against South Africa. Three days before the best-of-five-game series was due to start, Guam withdrew from the tournament, resulting in Australia's win by default.

Australia hosted the best-of-five-game series against South Africa at Blacktown Olympic Park, one of two venues for the 2000 Games. Australia swept the series 3–0 to advance to the main Olympic tournament in Athens. Australian short stop Glenn Williams was named the series Most Valuable Player.

2004 Olympic Games – Africa v Oceania Qualifying Results

5 February 2004 19:30 (UTC+11) at (Australia) Blacktown Olympic Park – Game 1
Team	1	2	3	4	5	6	7	8	9	R	H	E
Australia	0	0	0	0	1	3	2	0	2	8	10	1
South Africa	0	0	0	0	1	0	0	0	0	1	4	2
WP: Chris Oxspring (1–0) LP: Barry Armitage (0–1); Home runs: (Australia) : Dave Nilsson (1), Trent Durrington (1), Glenn Williams (1) (South Africa) : None; Boxscore

6 February 2004 19:30 (UTC+11) at (Australia) Blacktown Olympic Park – Game 2
Team	1	2	3	4	5	6	7	8	9	R	H	E
South Africa	0	0	0	0	0	1	0	3	0	4	8	2
Australia	0	0	0	3	0	0	3	0	X	6	4	2
WP: Simon Beresford (1–0) LP: Carl Michaels (0–1) Sv: PJ Bevis (1); Home runs: (South Africa) : None (Australia) : Ben Wigmore (1); Boxscore

7 February 2004 19:30 (UTC+11) at (Australia) Blacktown Olympic Park (F/7) – Game 3
Team	1	2	3	4	5	6	7	8	9	R	H	E
Australia	2	7	0	0	2	0	2			13	11	1
South Africa	1	0	0	0	0	0	0			1	4	2
WP: John Stephens (1–0) LP: Matthew Dancer (0–1); Attendance: 1,965; Boxscore

=== The Games ===
==== Preliminary phase ====
Despite losing the first two games against Cuba and South Korea, Australia won their next four games to secure a position in the semi-finals, including a record setting 22–2 demolition of Netherlands. No other team before or since has scored more than 20 runs in an Olympic baseball game, and only one other time has a team won by a margin of 20. (Chinese Taipei in 1992 beat Spain 20–0, and Cuba in 1996 beat Italy 20–6.) Olympic baseball operated with a mercy rule that would stop a game after seven (or eight) innings if one team was leading by ten or more runs, making it more difficult to post such large victories. Canada defeated Australia in their final round-robin game 11–0, making it the third time Australia had been beaten by a margin of 11 runs in as many tournaments.

2004 Olympic Games – Preliminary Results

15 August 10:30 (UTC+3) at (Greece) Helliniko Baseball Centre – Game 1
Team	1	2	3	4	5	6	7	8	9	R	H	E
Australia	0	0	0	0	0	0	0	0	1	1	5	3
Cuba	1	0	1	0	0	1	1	0	0	4	10	1
WP: Adiel Palma (1–0) LP: Craig Anderson (0–1) Sv: Jonder Martínez (1); Home runs: (Australia) : None (Cuba) : Michel Enríquez (1); Boxscore

16 August 10:30 (UTC+3) at (Greece) Helliniko Baseball Centre – Game 5
Team	1	2	3	4	5	6	7	8	9	R	H	E
Chinese Taipei	0	0	2	0	0	0	0	1	0	3	8	2
Australia	0	0	0	0	0	0	0	0	0	0	5	1
WP: Chien-Ming Wang (1–0) LP: John Stephens (0–1) Sv: Chin-Hui Tsao (1); Boxscore

17 August 18:30 (UTC+3) at (Greece) Helliniko Baseball Centre – Game 11
Team	1	2	3	4	5	6	7	8	9	R	H	E
Australia	0	0	0	0	0	0	2	4	0	6	12	0
Italy	0	0	0	0	0	0	0	0	0	0	1	1
WP: Chris Oxspring (1–0) LP: Michael Marchesano (0–1); Boxscore

18 August 11:30 (UTC+3) at (Greece) Helliniko Baseball Centre – Game 14
Team	1	2	3	4	5	6	7	8	9	R	H	E
Australia	0	0	0	3	0	0	3	3	0	9	15	1
Japan	0	0	0	1	3	0	0	0	0	4	9	1
WP: Ryan Rowland-Smith (1–0) LP: Daisuke Miura (0–1) Sv: Jeff Williams (1); Home runs: (Australia) : Dave Nilsson (1) (Japan) : Kosuke Fukudome (2); Boxscore

20 August 18:30 (UTC+3) at (Greece) Helliniko Baseball Centre – Game 19
Team	1	2	3	4	5	6	7	8	9	R	H	E
Greece	3	1	0	0	0	1	0	1	0	6	14	0
Australia	0	0	3	0	0	2	5	1	X	11	10	0
WP: Ryan Rowland-Smith (2–0) LP: Sean Spencer (0–1); Home runs: (Greece) : Peter Maestrales (1), James Kavourias (1) (Australia) : Brett Roneberg 2 (2), Paul Gonzales (1), Brendan Kingman (1); Boxscore

21 August 18:30 (UTC+3) at (Greece) Helliniko Baseball Centre (F/7) – Game 23
Team	1	2	3	4	5	6	7	8	9	R	H	E
Australia	9	5	5	1	0	0	0			22	17	2
Netherlands	0	1	0	0	1	0	0			2	4	1
WP: Craig Lewis (1–0) LP: Calvin Maduro (0–2); Home runs: (Australia) : Brett Roneberg (3), Gavin Fingleson (1), Rodney van Buizen (1), Glenn Williams (1) (Netherlands) : Yurrendel de Caster (3), Ralph Milliard (1); Boxscore

22 August 19:30 (UTC+3) at (Greece) Helliniko Baseball Centre – Game 28
Team	1	2	3	4	5	6	7	8	9	R	H	E
Canada	0	0	3	2	0	0	0	0	6	11	12	0
Australia	0	0	0	0	0	0	0	0	0	0	4	2
WP: Phil Devey (1–0) LP: Adrian Burnside (0–1); Home runs: (Canada) : Ryan Radmanovich (1), Jeremy Ware (1) (Australia) : None; Boxscore

==== Final phase ====
In the semis, Australia faced Japan. In pool play Australia had won relatively comfortably 9–4, though it took a much more hard-fought effort to clinch their first medal: they won 1–0. This set up a rematch of the very first match of the tournament to decide the gold medal, between Australia and Cuba. As in their previous three encounters, Cuba won to take gold, leaving Australia to claim silver in their best Olympic result, and their best result to date in a major international tournament. (The IBAF includes the Baseball World Cup, World Baseball Classic and Olympic Games as major world championships, while the Intercontinental Cup is considered a minor world championship.)

2004 Olympic Games – Finals Results

24 August 11:30 (UTC+3) at (Greece) Helliniko Baseball Centre – Semi-final
Team	1	2	3	4	5	6	7	8	9	R	H	E
Australia	0	0	0	0	0	1	0	0	0	1	5	2
Japan	0	0	0	0	0	0	0	0	0	0	5	0
WP: Chris Oxspring (2–0) LP: Daisuke Matsuzaka (1–1) Sv: Jeff Williams (2); Boxscore

25 August 20:00 (UTC+3) at (Greece) Helliniko Baseball Centre – Gold Medal Game
Team	1	2	3	4	5	6	7	8	9	R	H	E
Cuba	0	0	0	2	0	4	0	0	0	6	13	1
Australia	0	0	0	0	1	0	0	1	0	2	7	0
WP: Adiel Palma (3–0) LP: John Stephens (0–2) Sv: Danny Betancourt (2); Home runs: (Cuba) : Frederich Cepeda (2) (Australia) : Paul Gonzalez (2); Boxscore

== Beijing, 2008 ==
The 2008 Olympic Games baseball tournament saw the introduction of an expanded qualification phase. At prior Games, the host nation automatically qualified along with the top two teams from the Americas, Europe and Asia, and the eighth team being determined by a playoff between the best team from Oceania and from Africa. In an attempt to make the qualification a fairer representation of the top baseball nations, this was adjusted to include:

- the host nation
- the top 2 teams from an Americas qualifying tournament
- the top team from the 2007 European Baseball Championship
- the top team from the 2007 Asian Baseball Championship
- the top 3 teams from the Final Olympic Qualifying Tournament, consisting of:
  - the 3rd & 4th placed American teams
  - the 2nd & 3rd placed European teams (in actuality, the 2nd placed Great Britain withdrew, and were replaced by 4th placed Germany)
  - the 2nd & 3rd placed Asian teams
  - the top team from an Oceania qualifying tournament
  - the top team from an African qualifying tournament

Despite the change to the qualification structure, there were concerns raised by Australia and Canada about the timing of the tournament. As the tournament was scheduled for March, many of the players who would have otherwise been selected for the Australian, Canadian, and Mexican teams were unavailable due to commitments in the American Major League system. Though the Minor League players were eligible to play both in the qualifying tournament and the main Olympic competition, many were unavailable either due to the Major League clubs denying individuals permission, or players on the cusp of promotion to Major League teams choosing to remain in spring training camp.

When New Zealand withdrew from the 2007 Oceania Baseball Championship—intended to be a five-game series between the two nations—Australia was automatically awarded the Oceania berth in the Final Olympic Qualifying Tournament.

=== Warm-up ===
A series of exhibition games were scheduled, both to give match practice to the players, and also to serve as selection trials for the tournament itself. Two games were played against the New South Wales Patriots—a state side—in Sydney. As some of the players in the Australian team would likely come from the Patriots, New South Wales selected its team first for the two games. Given the lack of match practice at the international level, an additional series was organised, with Australia hosting Canada in what was originally going to be a four-game series. However five games were held, two in Brisbane and three on the Gold Coast. The Patriots won their series 1–0, and Canada won theirs 3–1, with one game drawn after 9 innings in each series.

2008 Olympic Games – Exhibition/Warm-up Results

22 February; Exhibition – Game 1	Australia	7–9	NSW Patriots	(Australia) Blacktown Olympic Park
22 February; Exhibition – Game 1		Boxscore		(Australia) Blacktown Olympic Park

23 February; Exhibition – Game 2	NSW Patriots	3–3	Australia	(Australia) Blacktown Olympic Park
23 February; Exhibition – Game 2		Boxscore		(Australia) Blacktown Olympic Park

28 February; Exhibition – Game 1	Australia	5–3	Canada	(Australia) John Murray Field; Attendance: 200
28 February; Exhibition – Game 1		Boxscore		(Australia) John Murray Field; Attendance: 200

29 February; Exhibition – Game 2	Canada	10–1	Australia	(Australia) John Murray Field; Attendance: 450
29 February; Exhibition – Game 2		Boxscore		(Australia) John Murray Field; Attendance: 450

1 March; Exhibition – Game 3	Australia	8–8	Canada	(Australia) Palm Meadows; Attendance: 950
1 March; Exhibition – Game 3		Boxscore		(Australia) Palm Meadows; Attendance: 950

2 March; Exhibition – Game 4	Canada	9–5	Australia	(Australia) Palm Meadows; Attendance: 400
2 March; Exhibition – Game 4		Boxscore		(Australia) Palm Meadows; Attendance: 400

3 March; Exhibition – Game 5	Australia	1–4	Canada	(Australia) Palm Meadows; Attendance: 30
3 March; Exhibition – Game 5		Boxscore		(Australia) Palm Meadows; Attendance: 30

=== Qualifying ===
Four days after the exhibition series on home soil, Australia competed in a round-robin format against Canada, Chinese Taipei, Germany, Mexico, South Africa, South Korea and Spain. Australia failed to qualify for the Olympic Games, finishing the tournament in 5th position. Their largest defeat in the tournament proved to be the decisive game for them, despite being only their second: had Australia beaten South Korea, rather than losing to them 16–2 in a mercy rule shortened game, Australia would have finished the tournament in 3rd, South Korea in 4th and Mexico 5th. This is particularly interesting, given that South Korea went on to win gold at Beijing.

2008 Olympic Games – Final Qualifying Tournament Results

7 March 19:35 (UTC+8) at (Taiwan) Douliou Baseball Stadium – Game 4
Team	1	2	3	4	5	6	7	8	9	R	H	E
Australia	0	1	1	2	0	0	0	0	0	4	7	1
Germany	1	0	0	0	0	0	0	0	0	1	6	0
WP: (Australia) Paul Mildren (1–0) LP: (Germany) Tim Henkenjohann (0–1) Sv: (Australia) Scott Mitchinson (1); Boxscore

8 March 19:35 (UTC+8) at (Taiwan) Taichung Intercontinental Baseball Stadium – Game 7 (F/7)
Team	1	2	3	4	5	6	7	8	9	R	H	E
Australia	1	0	0	0	1	0	0			2	10	0
South Korea	4	2	4	6	0	0	X			16	13	0
WP: (South Korea) Hyun-Jin Ryu (1–0) LP: (Australia) Greg Wiltshire (0–1); Home runs: (Australia) : None (South Korea) : Seung-Yeop Lee (1); Boxscore

9 March 15:35 (UTC+8) at (Taiwan) Douliou Baseball Stadium – Game 10
Team	1	2	3	4	5	6	7	8	9	R	H	E
Canada	0	1	0	0	0	0	2	2	0	5	8	3
Australia	0	0	4	0	4	0	0	2	X	10	13	1
WP: (Australia) Steven Kent (1–0) LP: (Canada) Brooks McNiven (0–1) Sv: (Australia) Adam Bright (1); Home runs: (Canada) : Jimmy van Ostrand (1), Matt Rogelstad (1), Ryan Radmanovich (1) (Australia) : None; Boxscore

10 March 21:35 (UTC+8) at (Taiwan) Douliou Baseball Stadium – Game 16
Team	1	2	3	4	5	6	7	8	9	R	H	E
Mexico	1	0	0	0	2	0	0	3	1	7	11	1
Australia	0	0	0	1	0	2	0	1	0	4	11	1
WP: (Mexico) Jose Silva (1–0) LP: (Australia) Adam Bright (0–1) Sv: (Mexico) Rafael Diaz (1); Boxscore

12 March 21:35 (UTC+8) at (Taiwan) Douliou Baseball Stadium – Game 20
Team	1	2	3	4	5	6	7	8	9	R	H	E
Australia	0	0	0	0	0	0	0	0	0	0	4	2
Chinese Taipei	0	4	0	0	0	0	1	0	X	5	7	1
WP: (Chinese Taipei) Chien-Fu Yang (2–0) LP: (Australia) Paul Mildren (1–1); Boxscore

13 March 15:35 (UTC+8) at (Taiwan) Taichung Intercontinental Baseball Stadium – Game 21
Team	1	2	3	4	5	6	7	8	9	R	H	E
Spain	0	0	0	0	0	0	0	0	0	0	1	2
Australia	3	3	0	3	0	0	0	0	X	9	14	0
WP: (Australia) Chris Mowday (1–0) LP: (Spain) Yoel Hernandez (0–2); Home runs: (Spain) : None (Australia) : Ben Risinger (1); Boxscore

14 March 15:35 (UTC+8) at (Taiwan) Douliou Baseball Stadium – Game 26
Team	1	2	3	4	5	6	7	8	9	R	H	E
Australia	4	0	3	2	0	0	3	1	0	13	14	4
South Africa	0	7	0	1	1	0	0	0	2	11	14	1
WP: (Australia) Bradley Tippett (1–0) LP: (South Africa) Kevin Townend (0–1); Home runs: (Australia) : Luke Hughes (1) (South Africa) : None; Boxscore

== Overall record ==
Australian Olympic Baseball Record by opponent
Opponent	Tournaments met	W–L record	Largest victory		Largest defeat		Current streak
Opponent	Tournaments met	W–L record	Score	Tournament	Score	Tournament	Current streak
Canada	3	2–1	10–5	Taiwan 2008 FQ	11–0	Greece 2004	W1
Chinese Taipei	2	0–2	–		5–0	Taiwan 2008 FQ	L2
Cuba	3	0–4	–		19–8 (F/8)	United States 1996	L4
Germany	1	1–0	4–1	Taiwan 2008 FQ	–		W1
Greece	1	1–0	11–6	Greece 2004	–		W1
Italy	3	1–2	6–0	Greece 2004	12–8	United States 1996	W1
Japan	3	3–1	9–4	Greece 2004	7–3	Australia 2000	W2
Mexico	1	0–1	–		7–4	Taiwan 2008 FQ	L1
Netherlands	3	1–2	22–2 (F/7)	Greece 2004	16–6 (F/8)	United States 1996	W1
Nicaragua	1	0–1	–		10–0 (F/8)	United States 1996	L1
South Africa	2	2–0	10–4	Australia 2000	–		W2
South Korea	4	2–2	11–8	United States 1996	16–2 (F/7)	Taiwan 2008 FQ	L1
Spain	1	1–0	9–0	Taiwan 2008 FQ	–		W1
United States	4	0–4	–		12–1 (F/7)	Australia 2000	L4
Overall	6	14–20	Against NED		Against KOR		W2
Overall	6	14–20	22–2 (F/7)	Greece 2004	16–2 (F/7)	Taiwan 2008 FQ	W2

== See also ==
- Australian Baseball Federation
- Australia national baseball team
- Baseball at the Summer Olympics

== Bibliography ==
- Cava, Pete (Summer 1992). "Baseball in the Olympics" (PDF). The ISOH Journal. 1 (1). International Society of Olympic Historians: 7–15. Archived (PDF) from the original on 7 September 2008.
- The Official Report of the Organizing Committee for the Games of the XVI Olympiad Melbourne 1956 (PDF). Melbourne, Australia: W. M. Houston, Government Printer. 1958. pp. 714–5. Archived (PDF) from the original on 12 September 2008 – via LA84 Foundation Digital Library.
- The Official Report of the Organizing Committee for the Games of the XXIVth Olympiad Seoul 1988 (PDF). Vol. 2: Competition Summary and Results. Seoul, South Korea: Korea Textbook. 20 September 1988. pp. 709–14 – via LA84 Foundation Digital Library.
- Romà Cuyàs, ed. (1992). Official Report of the Games of the XXV Olympiad Barcelona 1992 (PDF). Vol. 5: The Results. Barcelona, Spain: COOB'92 S.A. p. 91. ISBN 84-7868-283-X. Archived (PDF) from the original on 4 August 2010 – via LA84 Foundation Digital Library.
- The Atlanta Committee for the Olympic Games (1997). The Official Report of the Centennial Olympic Games (PDF). Atlanta, United States: Peachtree Publishers.
  - Official Report of the Centennial Olympic Games (PDF). Vol. 2. Atlanta: Peachtree. p. 320 – via LA84 Foundation Digital Library.
  - Official Report of the Centennial Olympic Games (PDF). Vol. 3: The competition Results. Atlanta: Peachtree. pp. 115–126 – via LA84 Foundation Digital Library.
- Sydney Organising Committee for the Olympic Games (2001). Official Report of the XXVII Olympiad (PDF). Canberra, Australia: Paragon Printers Australasia.
  - Official report of the XXVII Olympiad (PDF). Vol. 2: Celebrating the Games. Canberra, Australia: Paragon Printers Australasia. 2001. pp. 176–9. ISBN 0-9579616-0-X. Archived (PDF) from the original on 27 March 2009 – via LA84 Foundation Digital Library.
  - Official Results of the 2000 Olympic Games: Baseball. Canberra, Australia: Paragon Printers Australasia. 2001. ISBN 0-9579616-1-8 – via LA84 Foundation Digital Library.
