= List of Nippon Professional Baseball players (F) =

The following is a list of Nippon Professional Baseball players with the last name starting with F, retired or active.

== F ==
Name	Debut	Final Game	Position	Teams	Ref
Juan Feliciano					
Pedro Feliciano					
Jared Fernandez					
José Fernández					
Tony Fernández					
Cecil Fielder					
Pat Flury					
Will Flynt					
Lew Ford					
Esterlin Franco					
Julio Franco					
Matt Franco					
Micah Franklin					
Willie Fraser					
Yoshiyuki Fuchiwaki					
Akihito Fujii					
Atsushi Fujii					
Hiromi Fujii					
Isamu Fujii					
Masao Fujii					
Masashi Fujii					
Shugo Fujii					
Tsubasa Fujii					
Yasuo Fujii					
Kyuji Fujikawa					
Atsushi Fujimoto					
Hideo Fujimoto					
Hiroshi Fujimoto born 1963					
Hiroshi Fujimoto born 1976					
Sadayoshi Fujimoto					
Daisuke Fujimura					
Fumio Fujimura					
Yoshiaki Fujioka					
Daisuke Fujisaki					
Hironori Fujisaki					
Seigoh Fujishima					
Hiromasa Fujita					
Kazuya Fujita					
Masahiro Fujita					
Motoshi Fujita					
Shōzō Fujita					
Soichi Fujita born 1914					
Soichi Fujita born 1972					
Taira Fujita					
Taiyo Fujita					
Jiro Fujitate					
Koki Fujiwara					
Ryohei Fujiwara					
Toru Fujiwara					
Ryosuke Fukamachi					
Kazuho Fukasawa					
Takuya Fukata					
Ryohji Fukatani					
Kazuki Fukuchi					
Nobumasa Fukuda					
Satoshi Fukuda					
Shin'ichi Fukuda					
Shuhei Fukuda					
Kosuke Fukudome					
Junichi Fukuhara					
Shinobu Fukuhara					
Keiji Fukui					
Tsuyoshi Fukui					
Masakazu Fukukawa					
Kazuo Fukumori					
Makoto Fukumoto					
Yutaka Fukumoto					
Akihito Fukuoh					
Junichi Fukura					
Toru Fukura					
Hiroki Fukutome					
Kazuya Fukuura					
Ryutaro Fukuyama					
Takahiro Fukuzawa					
Yoichi Fukuzawa					
Satoshi Funaki					
Yasushi Funayama					
J. J. Furmaniak					
Shinichi Furukawa					
Yuuichi Furukawa					
Yuuki Furukawa					
Katsuaki Furuki					
Shigeyuki Furuki					
Kenji Furukubo					
Katsuyuki Furumizo					
Yasutaka Furusato					
Jun Furusawa					
Atsuya Furuta					
Takuya Furuya					
Tsuyoshi Furuya					
Ryouhei Fusejima					
Mike Fyhrie					
