= Rob Derksen =

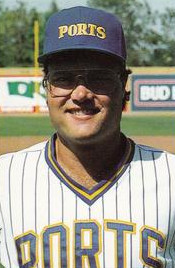
- Derksen with the Stockton Ports in 1988
- Pitcher / Coach
- Born: January 12, 1960; Milwaukee, Wisconsin, U.S.
- Died: June 16, 2004 (aged 44); New York City, New York, U.S.
- Batted: Right Threw: Right
- Stats at Baseball Reference

Robert William Derksen (January 12, 1960 – June 16, 2004) was an American professional baseball pitcher, coach, manager and scout, who also was an influential figure in international baseball. Derksen was the head coach of the 1996 Australia Olympic baseball team, the 2000 Guam national baseball team, and, at the time of his death, the 2004 Greece Olympic baseball team.

Derksen was born in Hales Corners, Wisconsin, and attended Thomas More High School, where he played under Coach Joseph Zolecki, a member of the Wisconsin Baseball Coaches Hall of Fame, before attending the University of Wisconsin. Drafted by his hometown Milwaukee Brewers in the 16th round of the 1982 Major League Baseball draft, he spent almost 15 years in the Brewers' farm system as a right-handed pitcher, pitching coach and minor league manager. A right-handed batter, Derksen stood 5 ft 11 in (1.80 m) tall and weighed 185 lb (84 kg). He compiled a won/lost mark of 11–6 with an earned run average of 3.18 in all or parts of five seasons at the Class A level, but by his fourth playing season, 1985, Derksen had become a part-time pitcher and a full-time pitching coach.

He later managed in the Milwaukee system with the Beloit Snappers of the Class A Midwest League (1990–1991), then returned to working as a pitching coach for the Brewers' Double-A El Paso Diablos affiliate. After the 1996 Summer Olympics, he joined the Boston Red Sox for one season (1997) as manager of their Sarasota Red Sox farm in the Class A Florida State League. His managerial record was 205–205, an even .500. Later in his career, in between Olympic and international baseball assignments, he was a scout for the Baltimore Orioles.

Derksen died from a heart attack at age 44 in New York City. When he was stricken, he was on a scouting trip to Long Island for the Greek Olympic team eight weeks prior to the 2004 Summer Games. According to ESPN.com, more than 600 attended his funeral and children from his youth league team were his pallbearers. "He was so good for baseball", pitcher A. J. Brack, a member of the 2004 Greek Olympic Team, said. "He loved the game, and he just wanted it to do well."

== See also ==
- Baseball at the 1996 Summer Olympics
