= Flury =

Flury is a surname. Notable people with the surname include:

- Alfred Flury (born 1914), Swiss boxer
- Jacques Flury (1932–1965), Swiss weightlifter
- Jasmine Flury (born 1993), Swiss alpine skier
- Pat Flury (born 1973), American baseball player
- Urs Joseph Flury (born 1941), Swiss musician

== See also ==
- Flury Koch (born 1945), Swiss cross-country skier
