= Shinya Miyamoto =

Japanese baseball player (born 1970)

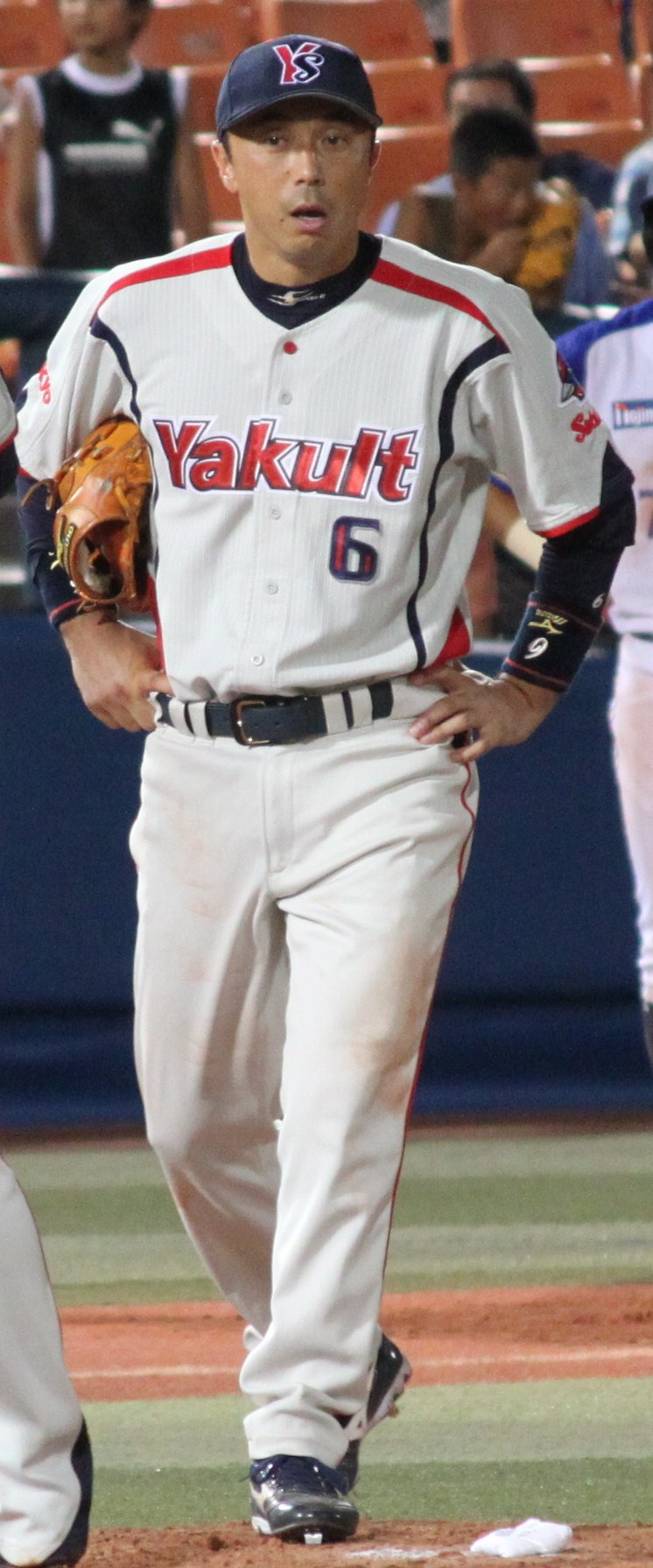
- Miyamoto with the Tokyo Yakult Swallows
- Infielder/Coach
- Born: November 5, 1970 (age 55); Suita, Osaka, Japan
- Batted: Right Threw: Right

NPB debut
- April 11, 1995, for the Yakult Swallows

Last appearance
- 2013, for the Tokyo Yakult Swallows

NPB statistics
- Batting average: .282
- Hits: 2,133
- Home runs: 62
- Runs batted in: 578
- Sacrifice bunts: 408
- Stats at Baseball Reference

Teams
- As player: Yakult Swallows/Tokyo Yakult Swallows (1995–2013); As coach: Tokyo Yakult Swallows (2009–2013, 2018–2019)

Career highlights and awards
- 8× Golden Glove Award winner (1997, 1999–2003, 2009–2010); 5× NPB All-Star (2002–2003, 2007–2009)
Medals
Representing Japan
Men's baseball
Olympic Games
Bronze medal – third place	Athens 2004	Team competition
World Baseball Classic
Gold medal – first place	2006 San Diego	Team

Shinya Miyamoto (宮本 慎也, Miyamoto Shin'ya; born November 5, 1970) is a former professional baseball player from Suita, Osaka, Japan. He played shortstop.

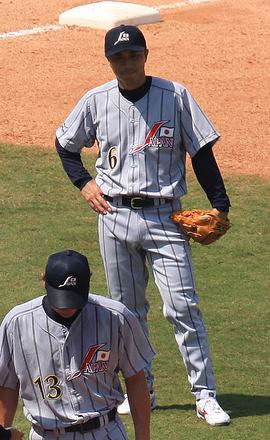
Miyamoto playing for Japan in the 2008 Summer Olympics.

He was chosen as the captain of the Japanese olympic baseball team for the 2004 and 2008 Summer Olympics, and won a bronze medal in 2004. He was also part of the 2006 World Baseball Classic Japanese baseball team.

== See also ==
- List of Nippon Professional Baseball career hits leaders
