= 2009 World Baseball Classic =

International baseball competition in 2009

Tournament details
- Countries: Canada; Japan; Mexico; Puerto Rico; United States
- Dates: March 5–23, 2009
- Teams: 16

Final positions
- Champions: Japan (2nd title)
- Runners-up: South Korea
- Third place: Venezuela
- Fourth place: United States

Tournament statistics
- Games played: 39
- Attendance: 801,408 (20,549 per game)

Awards
- MVP: (Japan) Daisuke Matsuzaka

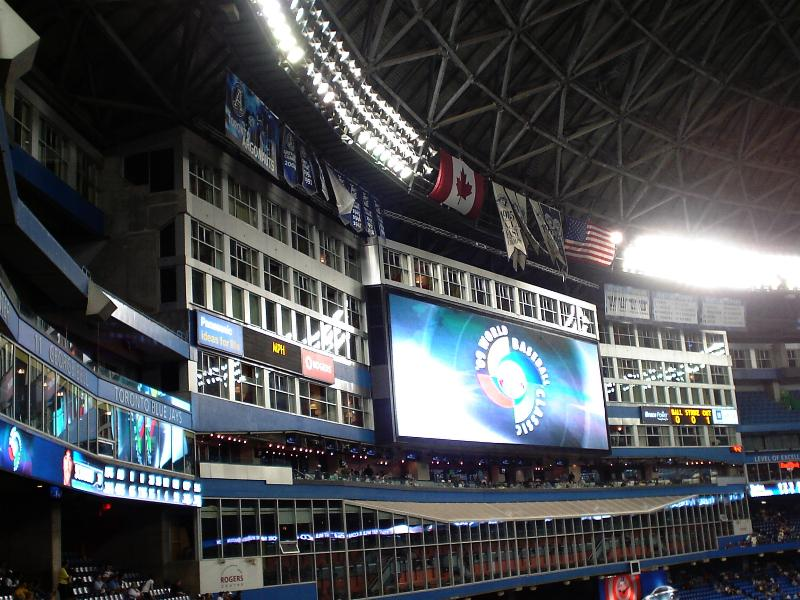
Jumbotron ad for the 2009 WBC at Rogers Centre

The 2009 World Baseball Classic (WBC) was an international baseball competition. It began on March 5 and finished March 23.

Unlike in 2006, when the round-robin format of the first two rounds led to some eliminations being decided by run-difference tiebreakers, the first two rounds of the 2009 edition were modified double-elimination format. The modification was that the final game of each bracket was winner-take-all, even if won by the team emerging from the loser's bracket, although that game only affected seeding, as two teams always advanced from each bracket.

The biggest surprise in the first round was the Netherlands, which twice defeated the Dominican Republic in Pool D to advance. The second round saw the two Pool A teams (South Korea and Japan) defeat the two Pool B teams (Cuba and Mexico) while the two Pool C teams (Venezuela and the United States) defeated the two Pool D teams (Puerto Rico and the Netherlands). South Korea and Japan then advanced to the final game, playing each other for the fifth time in the tournament (split 2–2 up to that time), and Japan emerged victorious for the second straight Classic, winning the final game 5–3 in 10 innings.

For the second straight Classic, Daisuke Matsuzaka was named the Most Valuable Player of the tournament.

== Format ==
As was the case for the 2006 tournament, the sixteen teams were split into four pools of four teams each. Whereas previously the teams played in round-robin competition in the first two rounds, this time they took part in a double-elimination format, similar to the U.S. College World Series sponsored by the NCAA. Under the new format, teams were only guaranteed to play two games. This change was made to eliminate the complicated tiebreaking procedures, which were required for one of the pools in each of the first two rounds in 2006.

After the first round, the tournament was held in the U.S. The top two teams from each of the four pools—seeded from the final game in their respective pools—went to the second round, with the teams from Pools A and B meeting at Petco Park in San Diego for Pool 1, and the teams in Pools C and D playing at Dolphin Stadium in Miami Gardens for Pool 2. Again, both pools made use of double-elimination to determine the teams qualifying for the semifinals. In another change from 2006, the four qualifying teams crossed over for the semifinals, with the winner of each pool playing against the runner-up from the other pool. The championship round process was otherwise unchanged, with each semifinal being a single elimination match, the victors meeting in the final to determine the tournament champion. All three championship round games were held at Dodger Stadium in Los Angeles.

In the final, the team with the higher winning percentage of games in the tournament were to be the home team. If the teams competing in the final had identical winning percentages in the tournament, then World Baseball Classic, Inc. (WBCI) would conduct a coin flip or draw to determine the home team.

== Rosters ==
Each participating national federation had a deadline of January 19, 2009, to submit a 45-man provisional roster. Final rosters of 28 players, which was required to include a minimum of 13 pitchers and two catchers, were submitted on February 24. If a player on the submitted roster was unable to play, usually due to injury, he could be substituted at any time before the start of the tournament. While rosters could not be changed during a round of competition, a team that advanced to a later round could change its roster for the later round.

== Venues ==
Seven stadiums were used during the tournament:

Pool A	Pool B	Pool C	Pool D
Tokyo, Japan	Mexico City, Mexico	Toronto, Canada	San Juan, Puerto Rico
Tokyo Dome	Foro Sol	Rogers Centre	Hiram Bithorn Stadium
Capacity: 42,000	Capacity: 26,000	Capacity: 49,539	Capacity: 18,264

Pool 1	Pool 2	Championship
San Diego, United States	Miami Gardens, United States	Los Angeles, United States
Petco Park	Dolphin Stadium	Dodger Stadium
Capacity: 42,685	Capacity: 38,560	Capacity: 56,000

== Pools composition ==
The 16 teams that participated in the 2006 World Baseball Classic were all invited back for the 2009 tournament. The World Baseball Classic, Inc. (WBCI) changed the members of each pool as compared with the 2006 Classic, however, except for Pool A. There was no official qualifying competition.

Note: Numbers in parentheses indicate positions in the IBAF World Rankings at the time of the tournament.

Pool A	Pool B	Pool C	Pool D
China (14)	Australia (10)	Canada (7)	Dominican Republic (17)
Chinese Taipei (5)	Cuba (1)	Italy (13)	Netherlands (6)
Japan (4)	Mexico (8)	United States (2)	Panama (9)
South Korea (3)	South Africa (20)	Venezuela (15)	Puerto Rico (11)

== First round ==
=== Pool A ===
Preliminaries
–	China	0
–	Japan	4
–	Chinese Taipei	0
–	South Korea	9
Lower round 1
L1	China	4
L2	Chinese Taipei	1

Qualifiers
W1	Japan	14
W2	South Korea	2
Lower final
W3	China	0
L4	South Korea	14

Seeding
W4	Japan	0
W5	South Korea	1

Date	Local time	Road team	Score	Home team	Inn.	Venue	Game duration	Attendance	Boxscore
Mar 5, 2009	18:30	China	0–4	Japan		Tokyo Dome	2:55	43,428	Boxscore
Mar 6, 2009	18:30	Chinese Taipei	0–9	South Korea		Tokyo Dome	2:48	12,704	Boxscore
Mar 7, 2009	12:30	Chinese Taipei	1–4	China		Tokyo Dome	2:51	12,890	Boxscore
Mar 7, 2009	19:00	Japan	14–2	South Korea	7	Tokyo Dome	2:48	45,640	Boxscore
Mar 8, 2009	18:30	China	0–14	South Korea	7	Tokyo Dome	2:13	12,571	Boxscore
Mar 9, 2009	18:30	South Korea	1–0	Japan		Tokyo Dome	3:02	42,879	Boxscore

=== Pool B ===
Preliminaries
–	South Africa	1
–	Cuba	8
–	Australia	17
–	Mexico	7
Lower round 1
L1	South Africa	3
L2	Mexico	14

Qualifiers
W1	Cuba	5
W2	Australia	4
Lower final
W3	Mexico	16
L4	Australia	1

Seeding
W4	Cuba	16
W5	Mexico	4

Date	Local time	Road team	Score	Home team	Inn.	Venue	Game duration	Attendance	Boxscore
Mar 8, 2009	12:00	South Africa	1–8	Cuba		Foro Sol	2:37	11,270	Boxscore
Mar 8, 2009	19:00	Australia	17–7	Mexico	8	Foro Sol	3:43	20,821	Boxscore
Mar 9, 2009	20:00	Mexico	14–3	South Africa		Foro Sol	3:33	10,311	Boxscore
Mar 10, 2009	20:00	Cuba	5–4	Australia		Foro Sol	3:29	13,396	Boxscore
Mar 11, 2009	20:00	Mexico	16–1	Australia	6	Foro Sol	2:31	16,718	Boxscore
Mar 12, 2009	19:00	Mexico	4–16	Cuba	7	Foro Sol	3:33	20,149	Boxscore

=== Pool C ===
Preliminaries
–	Canada	5
–	United States	6
–	Italy	0
–	Venezuela	7
Lower round 1
L1	Canada	2
L2	Italy	6

Qualifiers
W1	United States	15
W2	Venezuela	6
Lower final
W4	Italy	1
L3	Venezuela	10

Seeding
W3	United States	3
W5	Venezuela	5

Date	Local time	Road team	Score	Home team	Inn.	Venue	Game duration	Attendance	Boxscore
Mar 7, 2009	14:00	Canada	5–6	United States		Rogers Centre	2:55	42,314	Boxscore
Mar 7, 2009	20:00	Italy	0–7	Venezuela		Rogers Centre	3:00	13,272	Boxscore
Mar 8, 2009	20:00	United States	15–6	Venezuela		Rogers Centre	3:39	13,094	Boxscore
Mar 9, 2009	18:30	Italy	6–2	Canada		Rogers Centre	3:36	12,411	Boxscore
Mar 10, 2009	17:00	Italy	1–10	Venezuela		Rogers Centre	3:04	10,450	Boxscore
Mar 11, 2009	18:30	Venezuela	5–3	United States		Rogers Centre	3:08	12,358	Boxscore

=== Pool D ===
Preliminaries
–	Netherlands	3
–	Dominican Rep.	2
–	Panama	0
–	Puerto Rico	7
Lower round 1
L1	Dominican Rep.	9
L2	Panama	0

Qualifiers
W1	Netherlands	1
W2	Puerto Rico	3
Lower final
W3	Dominican Rep.	1
L4	Netherlands	2

Seeding
W4	Puerto Rico	5
W5	Netherlands	0

Date	Local time	Road team	Score	Home team	Inn.	Venue	Game duration	Attendance	Boxscore
Mar 7, 2009	12:00	Netherlands	3–2	Dominican Republic		Hiram Bithorn Stadium	3:01	9,335	Boxscore
Mar 7, 2009	18:00	Panama	0–7	Puerto Rico		Hiram Bithorn Stadium	2:57	17,348	Boxscore
Mar 8, 2009	16:30	Panama	0–9	Dominican Republic		Hiram Bithorn Stadium	2:46	9,221	Boxscore
Mar 9, 2009	18:30	Netherlands	1–3	Puerto Rico		Hiram Bithorn Stadium	3:11	19,479	Boxscore
Mar 10, 2009	18:30	Dominican Republic	1–2	Netherlands	11	Hiram Bithorn Stadium	3:38	11,814	Boxscore
Mar 11, 2009	17:30	Netherlands	0–5	Puerto Rico		Hiram Bithorn Stadium	2:55	19,501	Boxscore

== Second round ==
=== Pool 1 ===
Preliminaries
AR	Japan	6
BW	Cuba	0
BR	Mexico	2
AW	South Korea	8
Lower round 1
L1	Cuba	7
L2	Mexico	4

Qualifiers
W1	Japan	1
W2	South Korea	4
Lower final
W3	Cuba	0
L4	Japan	5

Seeding
W4	South Korea	2
W5	Japan	6

Date	Local time	Road team	Score	Home team	Inn.	Venue	Game duration	Attendance	Boxscore
Mar 15, 2009	13:00	Japan	6–0	Cuba		Petco Park	3:33	20,179	Boxscore
Mar 15, 2009	20:00	Mexico	2–8	South Korea		Petco Park	3:43	22,337	Boxscore
Mar 16, 2009	20:00	Cuba	7–4	Mexico		Petco Park	3:09	9,329	Boxscore
Mar 17, 2009	20:00	Japan	1–4	South Korea		Petco Park	3:21	15,332	Boxscore
Mar 18, 2009	20:00	Japan	5–0	Cuba		Petco Park	3:26	9,774	Boxscore
Mar 19, 2009	18:00	Japan	6–2	South Korea		Petco Park	3:42	14,832	Boxscore

=== Pool 2 ===
Preliminaries
DR	Netherlands	1
CW	Venezuela	3
CR	United States	1
DW	Puerto Rico	11
Lower round 1
L1	Netherlands	3
L2	United States	9

Qualifiers
W1	Venezuela	2
W2	Puerto Rico	0
Lower final
W3	United States	6
L4	Puerto Rico	5

Seeding
W4	Venezuela	10
W5	United States	6

Date	Local time	Road team	Score	Home team	Inn.	Venue	Game duration	Attendance	Boxscore
Mar 14, 2009	13:00	Netherlands	1–3	Venezuela		Dolphin Stadium	2:22	17,345	Boxscore
Mar 14, 2009	20:00	United States	1–11	Puerto Rico	7	Dolphin Stadium	2:15	30,595	Boxscore
Mar 15, 2009	19:30	Netherlands	3–9	United States		Dolphin Stadium	3:14	11,059	Boxscore
Mar 16, 2009	20:00	Venezuela	2–0	Puerto Rico		Dolphin Stadium	3:23	25,599	Boxscore
Mar 17, 2009	19:00	Puerto Rico	5–6	United States		Dolphin Stadium	3:54	13,224	Boxscore
Mar 18, 2009	19:00	United States	6–10	Venezuela		Dolphin Stadium	3:32	16,575	Boxscore

== Championship round ==
Semifinals
1R	South Korea	10
2W	Venezuela	2
2R	United States	4
1W	Japan	9

Final
SF1W	South Korea	3
SF2W	Japan	5

=== Semifinals ===
Date	Local time	Road team	Score	Home team	Inn.	Venue	Game duration	Attendance	Boxscore
Mar 21, 2009	18:00	South Korea	10–2	Venezuela		Dodger Stadium	3:22	43,378	Boxscore
Mar 22, 2009	17:00	United States	4–9	Japan		Dodger Stadium	3:15	43,630	Boxscore

=== Final ===
Date	Local time	Road team	Score	Home team	Inn.	Venue	Game duration	Attendance	Boxscore
Mar 23, 2009	18:00	Japan	5–3	South Korea	10	Dodger Stadium	4:00	54,846	Boxscore

== Final standings ==
Organizer WBCI has no interest in the final standings and did not compute. So, it was calculated by IBAF for the IBAF Men's Baseball World Rankings.

In the final standings, ties were to be broken in the following order of priority:

1. The team allowing the fewest runs per nine innings (RA/9) in all games;
2. The team allowing the fewest earned runs per nine innings (ERA) in all games;
3. The team with the highest batting average (AVG) in all games;

Rk	Team	W	L	Tiebreaker
1	Japan	7	2	–
Lost in Final
2	South Korea	6	3	–
Lost in Semifinals
3	Venezuela	6	2	–
4	United States	4	4	–
Eliminated in Second Round
5	Puerto Rico	4	2	1.75 RA/9
6	Cuba	4	2	4.15 RA/9
7	Netherlands	2	4	3.98 RA/9
8	Mexico	2	4	10.10 RA/9
Eliminated in First Round
9	Dominican Republic	1	2	1.57 RA/9
10	Italy	1	2	6.84 RA/9
11	China	1	2	7.43 RA/9
12	Australia	1	2	10.96 RA/9
13	Canada	0	2	6.35 RA/9
14	Chinese Taipei	0	2	7.31 RA/9
15	Panama	0	2	9.00 RA/9
16	South Africa	0	2	11.65 RA/9

2009 World Baseball Classic champions

Japan
Second title

== Attendance ==
801,408 (avg. 20,549; pct. 54.5%)

=== First round ===
453,374 (avg. 18,891; pct. 55.6%)

- Pool A – 170,112 (avg. 28,352; pct. 67.5%)
- Pool B – 92,665 (avg. 15,444; pct. 59.4%)
- Pool C – 103,899 (avg. 17,317; pct. 35.0%)
- Pool D – 86,698 (avg. 14,450; pct. 79.1%)

=== Second round ===
206,180 (avg. 17,182; pct. 42.3%)

- Pool 1 – 91,783 (avg. 15,297; pct. 35.8%)
- Pool 2 – 114,397 (avg. 19,066; pct. 49.4%)

=== Championship round ===
141,854 (avg. 47,285; pct. 84.4%)

- Semifinals – 87,008 (avg. 43,504; pct. 77.7%)
- Final – 54,846 (avg. 54,846; pct. 97.9%)

== 2009 All-World Baseball Classic team ==
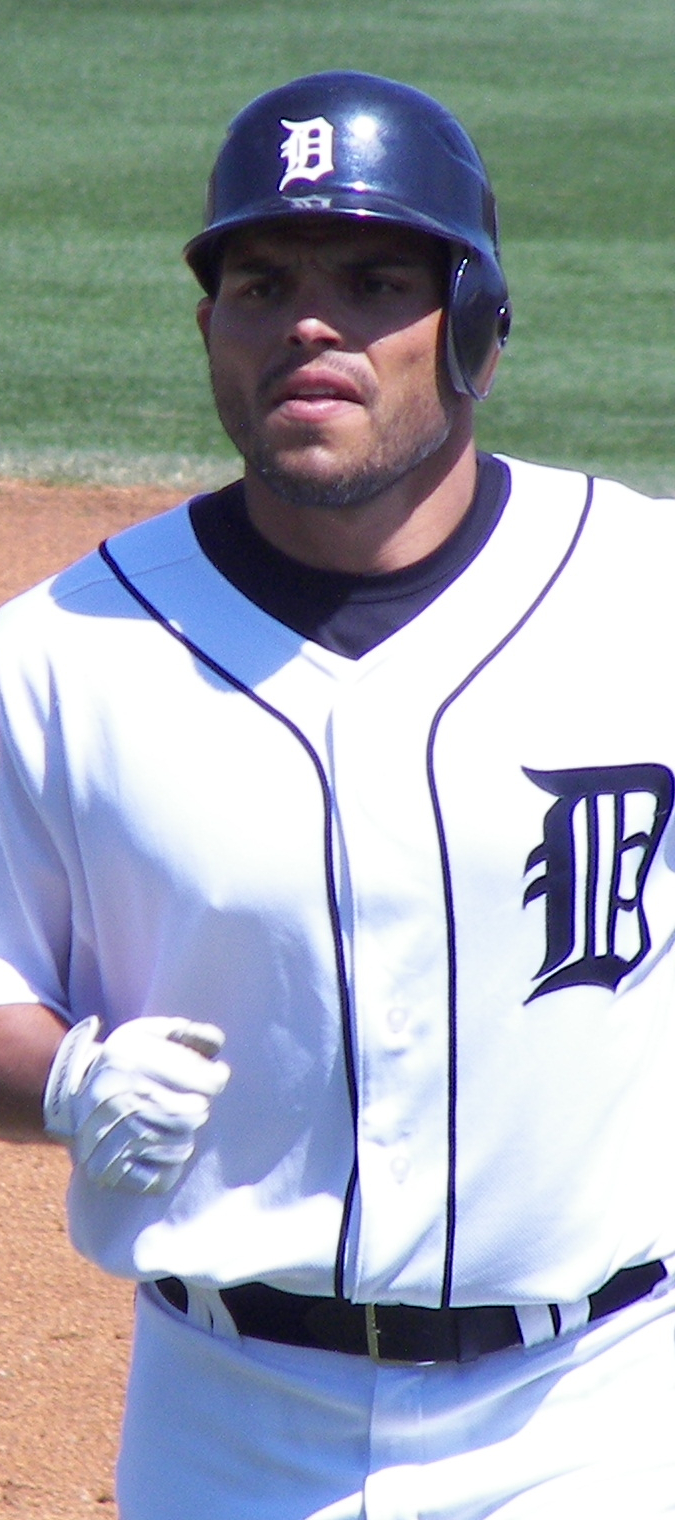
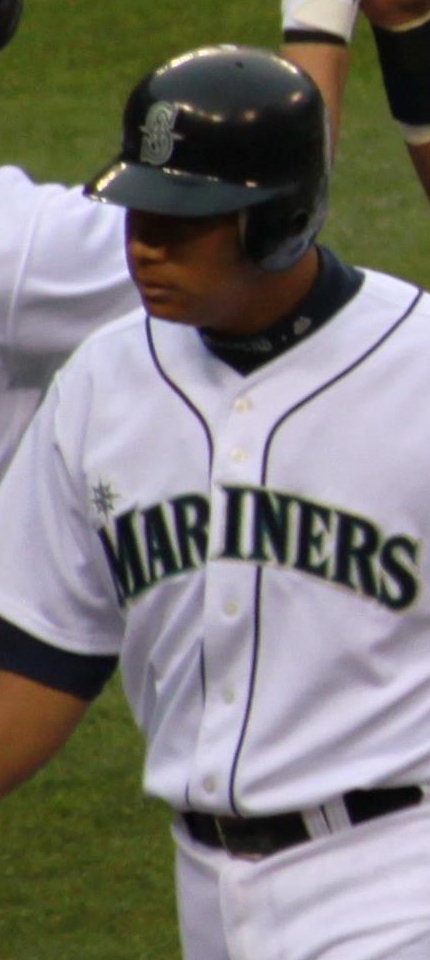
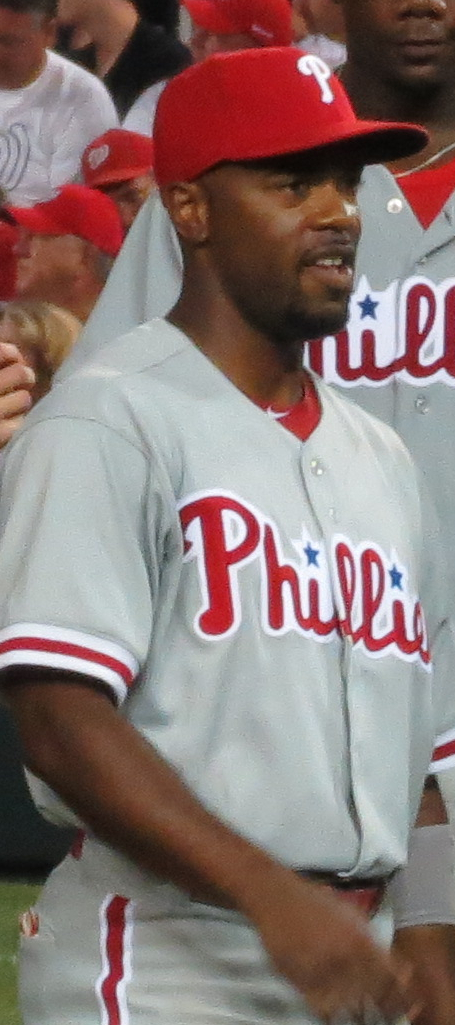
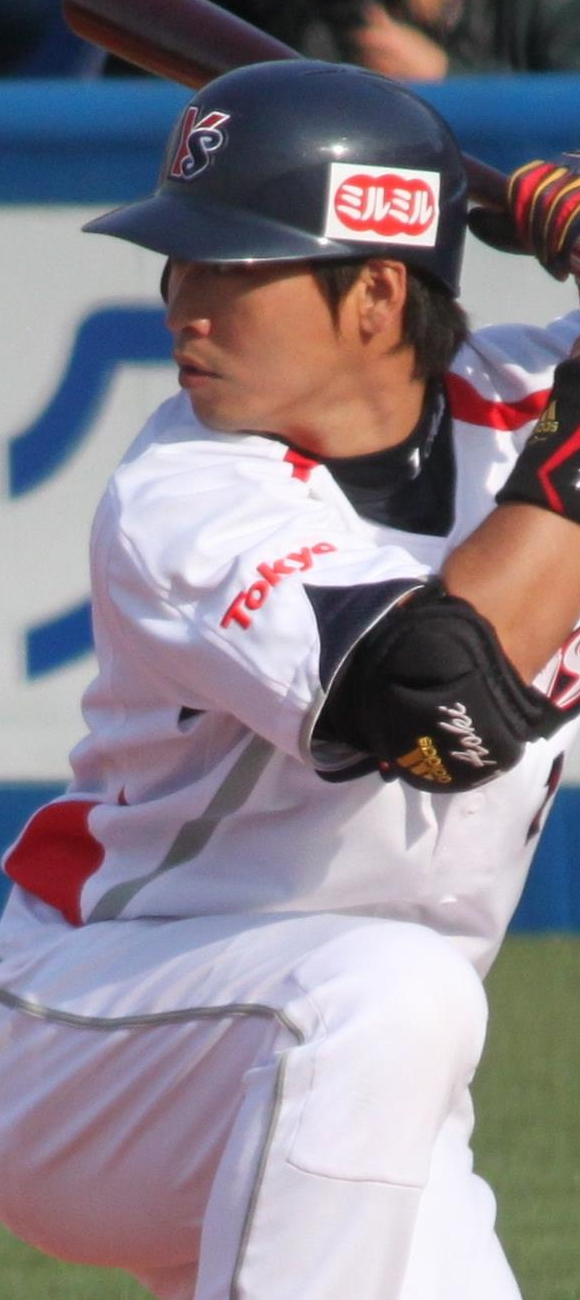
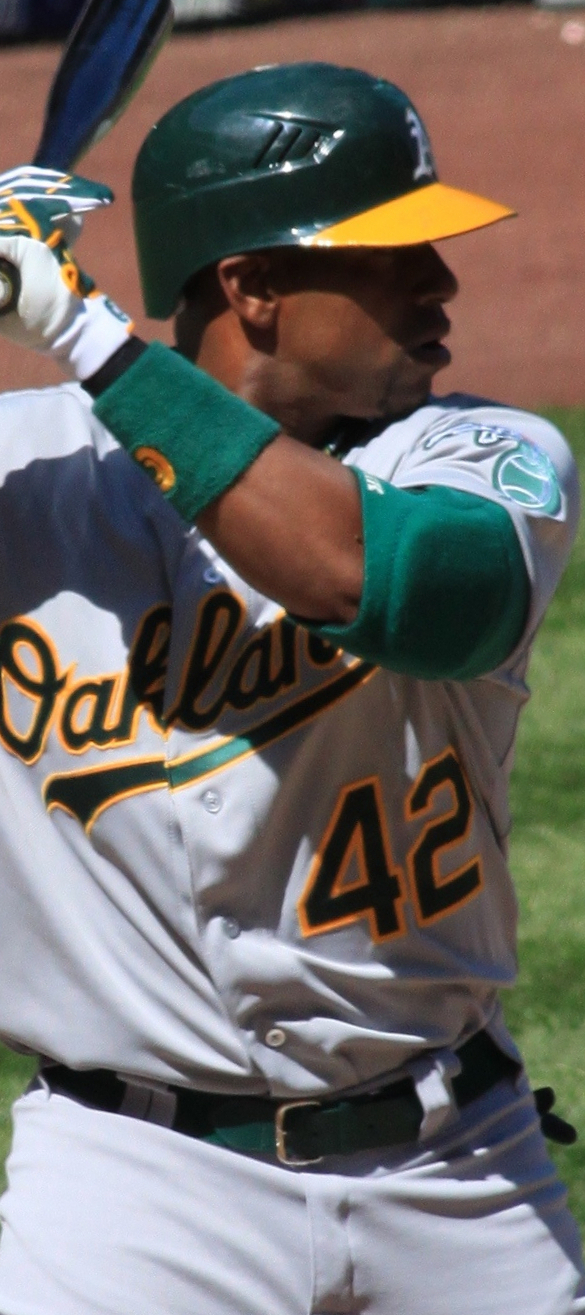
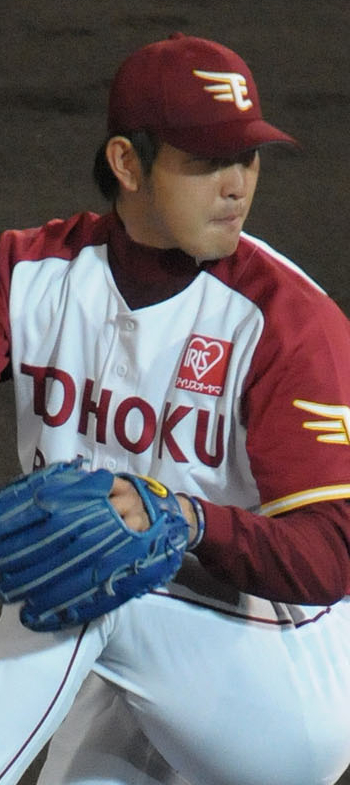
Players named to the All-WBC Team (from left to right);
Catcher – Iván Rodríguez of Puerto Rico
Second baseman – José López of Venezuela
Shortstop – Jimmy Rollins of the United States
Outfielder – Norichika Aoki of Japan
Outfielder – Yoenis Céspedes of Cuba
Pitcher – Hisashi Iwakuma of Japan

Note: The tournament Most Valuable Player was Daisuke Matsuzaka.

Position	Player
C	(Puerto Rico) Iván Rodríguez
1B	(South Korea) Tae-kyun Kim
2B	(Venezuela) José López
3B	(South Korea) Bum-ho Lee
SS	(United States) Jimmy Rollins
OF	(Japan) Norichika Aoki
OF	(Cuba) Frederich Cepeda
OF	(Cuba) Yoenis Céspedes
DH	(South Korea) Hyun-soo Kim
P	(South Korea) Jung-keun Bong
P	(Japan) Hisashi Iwakuma
P	(Japan) Daisuke Matsuzaka

== Statistics leaders ==
=== Batting ===
Statistic	Name	Total/Avg
Batting average*	(Australia) Brett Roneberg	.714
Hits	(Japan) Norichika Aoki (Cuba) Frederich Cepeda (Japan) Ichiro Suzuki	12
Runs	(United States) Adam Dunn (South Korea) Tae-kyun Kim (United States) Kevin Youkilis	9
Home runs	7 Players	3
RBI	(South Korea) Tae-kyun Kim	11
Walks	(United States) Adam Dunn	9
Strikeouts	(United States) Adam Dunn (Japan) Michihiro Ogasawara	10
Stolen bases	(Japan) Yasuyuki Kataoka (United States) Jimmy Rollins	4
On-base percentage*	(Canada) Jason Bay	.778
Slugging percentage*	(Australia) Brett Roneberg	1.286
OPS*	(Australia) Brett Roneberg	2.036

* Minimum 2.7 plate appearances per game

=== Pitching ===
Statistic	Name	Total/Avg
Wins	(Japan) Daisuke Matsuzaka	3
Losses	(United States) Jeremy Guthrie	2
Saves	(Venezuela) Francisco Rodríguez	3
Innings pitched	(Japan) Hisashi Iwakuma	20.0
Hits allowed	(United States) Roy Oswalt	17
Runs allowed	(United States) Jeremy Guthrie	10
Earned runs allowed	(South Korea) Kwang-hyun Kim	8
ERA*	(Venezuela) Enrique González	0.00**
Walks	5 Players	6
Strikeouts	(Japan) Yu Darvish	20
WHIP*	(Dominican Republic) Rafael Pérez	0.00

* Minimum 0.8 innings pitched per game
** González is tied with 17 others with a 0.00 ERA but he pitched the most innings with 9.2

== Additional rules ==
As was the case for the 2006 Classic, several rules were announced for the 2009 tournament that modified the existing rules for international baseball set out by the IBAF.

Once again there were limits on the number of pitches thrown in a game, though the limits themselves were changed from the previous tournament:

- 70 pitches in First Round (up from 65 in 2006)
- 85 pitches in Second Round (up from 80 in 2006)
- 100 pitches in Championship Round (up from 95 in 2006)

If a pitcher reached his limit during an at bat, he was allowed to finish pitching to the batter, but was removed from the game at the end of the at bat.

A 30–pitch outing needed to be followed by one day off, and a 50–pitch outing by four days off. No one would be allowed to pitch on three consecutive days. As the championship round was played over three consecutive days, a so-called "pitcher rest equalization" rule was added: a pitcher making 30 or more pitches in a semifinal was ineligible to pitch in the final. This negated an advantage the winners of the first semifinal would have had in the final.

A mercy rule came into effect when one team led by either fifteen runs after five innings, or ten runs after seven innings in the first two rounds.

Instant replay was also available to umpires during the tournament. As was introduced in Major League Baseball during the 2008 season, replays were only used to adjudicate on home run decisions, to determine whether the ball was fair or foul, over the fence or not, and the impact of fan interference.

An alternative version of the IBAF's extra inning rule was also introduced. If after 12 innings the score was still tied, each half inning thereafter would have started with runners on second and first base. The runners would have been the eighth and ninth hitters due in that inning respectively. For example, if the number five hitter was due to lead off the inning, the number three hitter would have been on second base, and the number four hitter on first base. However, this rule was never actually employed in this year's Classic, as the two extra-inning games in the tournament ended prior to a 13th inning.

All base coaches were required to wear protective helmets, in the aftermath of the death of Mike Coolbaugh and participating teams were required to announce the next day's starting pitcher. Additionally, a modified early termination rule was in effect for the first two rounds; had a team been ahead by 15 or more runs after five innings or ten or more runs after seven or eight innings, the game ended at that point.

== Prize money ==
USD 14,000,000

=== By final standings ===
- Champions – USD 2,700,000
- Runners-up – USD 1,700,000
- Semifinalists – USD 1,200,000 (x 2 teams)
- Eliminated in Second Round – USD 700,000 (x 4 teams)
- Eliminated in First Round – USD 300,000 (x 8 teams)

=== Bonus for pool winners ===
- First Round – USD 300,000 (x 4 teams)
- Second Round – USD 400,000 (x 2 teams)

== Media coverage ==
In the United States, ESPN and the MLB Network shared the rights, with ESPN broadcasting 23 of the games, including the Finals, while MLB Network showed the remaining 16. Spanish language telecasts in the U.S. were handled by ESPN Deportes telecasting all games. Internationally, it was broadcast to 167 countries by ESPN International.

In Canada, Rogers Sportsnet aired all 39 games.

In the Dominican Republic, CDN (Cadena de Noticias) and CDN2 broadcast all games live (except for games played in Tokyo, shown on tape delay)

In Japan, J Sports broadcast all 39 games. TV Asahi (Round 1) and TBS (Round 2 and Finals) broadcast all games featuring Japan. For all games featuring Japan, they gained viewing ratings of at least 20%. The final game gained ratings in the range 30-45%.

== Video games ==
World Baseball Classic 2009 has licensed three video games, all only released in Japan: Pro Yakyuu Spirits 6, Baseball Heroes 2009 and Jikkyou Pawafuru Major League 2009
