= 2004 Americas Olympic Baseball Qualifying Tournament =

Two spots in the Baseball at the 2004 Summer Olympics were available to baseball teams of the Pan American Baseball Confederation. To decide which teams would qualify, a tournament was held in 2003 in Panama, from 30 October to 10 November in the Estadio Nacional de Panamá and the Estadio Juan Demóstenes Arosemena in Panama City and the Estadio José Antonio Remón Cantera in Aguadulce. The tournament was won by Cuba, with Canada also qualifying for the Olympics.

Notably, the United States team did not qualify, after losing to Mexico in the quarterfinals. This elicited shock in the American media as the USA were the defending gold medalists. The major reason for defeat was the scheduling of the tournament, which meant the Americans could not even use minor league players.

== Withdrawals ==
Although the tournament was originally scheduled to include 13 teams, four withdrew before their first game: Venezuela, the Dominican Republic, Aruba and the Bahamas. As the Bahamas were a last-minute withdrawal, the tournament structure was left unbalanced, with one group larger than the other.

== Preliminary round ==
=== Group A ===
Pos	Team	Pld	W	L	RF	RA	RD	PCT	GB	Qualification
1	Cuba	3	3	0	16	8	+8	1.000	—	Advance to Final round
2	Canada	3	2	1	18	14	+4	.667	1	Advance to Final round
3	Puerto Rico	3	1	2	12	13	−1	.333	2	Advance to Final round
4	Mexico	3	0	3	7	18	−11	.000	3	Advance to Final round

Source: International Baseball Federation

31 October 2003; 15:00 (UTC–5)	Canada	8 – 5 (F/11)	Puerto Rico	Estadio Nacional de Panamá, Panama City
31 October 2003; 15:00 (UTC–5)		Boxscore		Estadio Nacional de Panamá, Panama City

1 November 2003; 20:00 (UTC–5)	Mexico	1 – 5	Puerto Rico	Estadio Nacional de Panamá, Panama City
1 November 2003; 20:00 (UTC–5)		Boxscore		Estadio Nacional de Panamá, Panama City

2 November 2003; 20:00 (UTC–5)	Puerto Rico	2 – 4	Cuba	Estadio Nacional de Panamá, Panama City
2 November 2003; 20:00 (UTC–5)		Boxscore		Estadio Nacional de Panamá, Panama City

3 November 2003; 14:00 (UTC–5)	Mexico	4 – 5 (F/13)	Cuba	Estadio Juan Demóstenes Arosemena, Panama City
3 November 2003; 14:00 (UTC–5)		Boxscore		Estadio Juan Demóstenes Arosemena, Panama City

4 November 2003; 20:00 (UTC–5)	Canada	8 – 2	Mexico	Estadio Nacional de Panamá, Panama City
4 November 2003; 20:00 (UTC–5)		Boxscore		Estadio Nacional de Panamá, Panama City

5 November 2003; 15:00 (UTC–5)	Cuba	7 – 2	Canada	Estadio Nacional de Panamá, Panama City
5 November 2003; 15:00 (UTC–5)		Boxscore		Estadio Nacional de Panamá, Panama City

=== Group B ===
Pos	Team	Pld	W	L	RF	RA	RD	PCT	GB	Qualification
1	United States	3	3	0	20	0	+20	1.000	—	Advance to Final round
2	Panama (H)	4	3	1	28	9	+19	.750	0.5	Advance to Final round
3	Colombia	4	2	2	11	23	−12	.500	1.5	Advance to Final round
4	Brazil	3	1	2	8	16	−8	.333	2	Advance to Final round
5	Nicaragua	4	0	4	8	27	−19	.000	3.5	

Source: International Baseball Federation
(H) Hosts

30 October 2003; 20:00 (UTC–5)	Colombia	0 – 6	Panama	Estadio Nacional de Panamá, Panama City
30 October 2003; 20:00 (UTC–5)		Boxscore		Estadio Nacional de Panamá, Panama City

31 October 2003; 10:00 (UTC–5)	United States	7 – 0	Nicaragua	Estadio Nacional de Panamá, Panama City
31 October 2003; 10:00 (UTC–5)		Boxscore		Estadio Nacional de Panamá, Panama City

2 November 2003; 11:00 (UTC–5)	Brazil	4 – 5	Colombia	Estadio Juan Demóstenes Arosemena, Panama City
2 November 2003; 11:00 (UTC–5)		Boxscore		Estadio Juan Demóstenes Arosemena, Panama City

2 November 2003; 15:00 (UTC–5)	Panama	11 – 5	Nicaragua	Estadio José Antonio Remón Cantera, Aguadulce
2 November 2003; 15:00 (UTC–5)		Boxscore		Estadio José Antonio Remón Cantera, Aguadulce

3 November 2003; 20:00 (UTC–5)	Panama	11 – 1 (F/7)	Brazil	Estadio Nacional de Panamá, Panama City
3 November 2003; 20:00 (UTC–5)		Boxscore		Estadio Nacional de Panamá, Panama City

4 November 2003; 10:00 (UTC–5)	Colombia	0 – 10 (F/7)	United States	Estadio Nacional de Panamá, Panama City
4 November 2003; 10:00 (UTC–5)		Boxscore		Estadio Nacional de Panamá, Panama City

4 November 2003; 14:00 (UTC–5)	Nicaragua	0 – 3	Brazil	Estadio Juan Demóstenes Arosemena, Panama City
4 November 2003; 14:00 (UTC–5)		Boxscore		Estadio Juan Demóstenes Arosemena, Panama City

5 November 2003; 10:00 (UTC–5)	Nicaragua	3 – 6	Colombia	Estadio Juan Demóstenes Arosemena, Panama City
5 November 2003; 10:00 (UTC–5)		Boxscore		Estadio Juan Demóstenes Arosemena, Panama City

5 November 2003; 20:00 (UTC–5)	United States	3 – 0	Panama	Estadio Nacional de Panamá, Panama City
5 November 2003; 20:00 (UTC–5)		Boxscore		Estadio Nacional de Panamá, Panama City

Note: The game between the United States and Brazil was delayed due to weather. Before it could be played it became irrelevant to the standings, and was therefore cancelled.

== Final round ==
Quarterfinals
A1	Cuba	5
B4	Brazil	0
B2	Panama	3
A3	Puerto Rico	5
B1	United States	1
A4	Mexico	2
A2	Canada	14
B3	Colombia	6

Semifinals
A1	Cuba	10
A3	Puerto Rico	0
A4	Mexico	1
A2	Canada	11

Finals
A1	Cuba	5
A2	Canada	0
Third place
A3	Puerto Rico	1
A4	Mexico	10
