= Baseball at the 2004 Summer Olympics =

Baseball at the Games of the XXVIII Olympiad
- Venue: Helliniko Olympic Complex
- Dates: 15–25 August 2004
- Teams: 8

Medalists
1st place, gold medalist(s)		Cuba
2nd place, silver medalist(s)		Australia
3rd place, bronze medalist(s)		Japan

Baseball at the 2004 Summer Olympics was held on two separate diamonds within the Helliniko Olympic Complex, from 15 to 25 August. For the second time in Olympic competition, professional baseball players were eligible to participate, though no active players from Major League Baseball were available.

The competition consisted of a preliminary round with each team playing all the other teams once, for a total of seven games. The top four teams at the end of this round advanced to the medals round. The medals round consisted of two semifinal games with the winners advancing to the gold medal game. The losing teams of the semifinals would play in the bronze medal game.

== Medalists ==
Gold	Silver	Bronze
Cuba; Eduardo Paret; Ariel Pestano; Michel Enríquez; Yoandry Urgellés; Danny Betancourt; Adiel Palma; Norge Luis Vera; Alexei Ramírez; Vicyohandri Odelín; Frederich Cepeda; Antonio Scull; Luis Borroto; Frank Montieth; Yorelvis Charles; Yulieski Gourriel; Norberto González; Osmani Urrutia; Eriel Sánchez; Carlos Tabares; Jonder Martínez; Roger Machado; Danny Miranda; Manuel Vega; Pedro Luis Lazo Manager: Higinio Vélez	Australia; Jeff Williams; Gavin Fingleson; Brett Tamburrino; Rodney van Buizen; Andrew Utting; Trent Oeltjen; Nick Kimpton; Ryan Rowland-Smith; Dave Nilsson; Ben Wigmore; Brett Roneberg; Glenn Williams; Rich Thompson; Wayne Ough; Brendan Kingman; Paul Gonzalez; Tom Brice; Craig Lewis; Graeme Lloyd; John Stephens; Craig Anderson; Chris Oxspring; Phil Stockman; Adrian Burnside Manager: Jon Deeble	Japan; Kosuke Fukudome; Michihiro Ogasawara; Norihiro Nakamura; Shinya Miyamoto; Makoto Kaneko; Kenji Johjima; Yoshitomo Tani; Naoyuki Shimizu; Hitoki Iwase; Hiroki Kuroda; Yuya Ando; Daisuke Miura; Daisuke Matsuzaka; Koji Uehara; Hisashi Iwakuma; Tsuyoshi Wada; Arihito Muramatsu; Yoshinobu Takahashi; Atsushi Fujimoto; Takuya Kimura; Masahide Kobayashi; Kazuhiro Wada; Ryoji Aikawa; Hirotoshi Ishii Manager: Kiyoshi Nakahata

== Team squads ==
Team	Qualification criteria	Appearance
Australia	Winner of Oceania Champion vs Africa Champion (South Africa)	3rd
Canada	Second place at Americas Olympic Qualifying Tournament in Panama	1st
Chinese Taipei	Second place at Asian Championship	2nd
Cuba	First place at Americas Olympic Qualifying Tournament in Panama	4th
Greece	Automatic as host nation of the Olympics	1st
Italy	First place at European Olympic Qualification Tournament	4th
Japan	First place at Asian Championship	4th
Netherlands	Second place at European Olympic Qualification Tournament	3rd

== Controversy ==
Despite being the defending gold medalists, the United States did not make it to Athens after losing a qualifying game to Mexico, 1–0. The Americas Tournament, which decided which two teams from North America, South America and the Caribbean went to Athens, was single-elimination, when almost all other baseball tournaments are double-elimination. Canada eventually defeated Mexico to advance to the Olympics. The qualifying rounds were also scheduled in such a way that the United States could not even use minor-leaguers and had to rely on collegians instead. Many American ballplayers made it to Athens anyway, as members of the nascent Greek team, which featured only one player actually born in Greece.

Others took issue with the fact that three of the eight slots in the Olympics (including the hosts) were European, while the Americas and Asia (with much stronger baseball nations) got only two slots apiece. The absence of such teams as the USA, Mexico, the Dominican Republic and South Korea led to much media discussion.

The 2008 tournament changed the qualifying procedure; the United States qualified, as did Cuba and the host country, China.

== Bracket ==
Semifinals
Australia	1
Japan	0
Canada	5
Cuba	8

Gold Medal Match
Cuba	6
Australia	2
Bronze Medal Match
Japan	11
Canada	2

== Results ==
=== Preliminary round ===
The top four teams (Japan, Cuba, Canada and Australia) advanced to the semifinals. To determine the seed ranking of teams tied in the standings, the result of the two teams' game against each other was used. Japan therefore received first place due to the win over Cuba. In the semi-finals, Japan (#1) played Australia (#4) and Cuba (#2) played Canada (#3). The higher ranked team in each game was the home team.

Pos	Team	Pld	W	L	RF	RA	RD	PCT	GB	Qualification
1	Japan	7	6	1	49	20	+29	.857 (Note: Japan defeated Cuba 6–3.)	—	Advance to knockout round
2	Cuba	7	6	1	41	17	+24	.857	—	Advance to knockout round
3	Canada	7	5	2	39	17	+22	.714	1	Advance to knockout round
4	Australia	7	4	3	49	30	+19	.571	2	Advance to knockout round
5	Chinese Taipei	7	3	4	24	28	−4	.429	3	
6	Netherlands	7	2	5	29	55	−26	.286	4	
7	Greece (H)	7	1	6	24	49	−25	.143 (Note: Greece defeated Italy 12–7.)	5	
8	Italy	7	1	6	19	58	−39	.143	5	

(H) Hosts
Notes:

August 15

Team	1	2	3	4	5	6	7	8	9	R	H	E
Australia	0	0	0	0	0	0	0	0	1	1	5	3
Cuba	1	0	1	0	0	1	1	0	x	4	10	1
WP: Adiel Palma (1–0) LP: Craig Anderson (0–1) Sv: Jonder Martínez (1S); Home runs: AUS: None; CUB: Michel Enríquez in 1st, 1 RBI; Osmani Urrutia in 6th, 1 RBI

Team	1	2	3	4	5	6	7	8	9	R	H	E
Chinese Taipei	0	0	0	0	0	0	0	0	0	0	6	4
Canada	0	2	0	1	0	0	2	2	x	7	9	1
WP: Mike Johnson (1–0) LP: Chang Chih-Chia (0–1)

Team	1	2	3	4	5	6	7	R	H	E
Japan	2	0	3	1	1	4	1	12	13	0
Italy	0	0	0	0	0	0	0	0	4	0
WP: Koji Uehara (1–0) LP: Anthony Massimino (0–1); Home runs: JPN: Norihiro Nakamura in 3rd, 2 RBIs; K. Fukudome in 4th, 1 RBI; ITA: None

Team	1	2	3	4	5	6	7	8	9	R	H	E
Netherlands	0	0	0	6	0	0	0	0	5	11	13	1
Greece	0	0	0	0	0	0	0	0	0	0	2	2
WP: Calvin Maduro (1–0) LP: Clinton Zavaras (0–1); Home runs: NED: Yurendell DeCaster in 4th, 3 RBIs; R. Balentien in 9th, 2 RBIs; GRE: None

August 16

Team	1	2	3	4	5	6	7	8	9	R	H	E
Chinese Taipei	0	0	2	0	0	0	0	1	0	3	8	2
Australia	0	0	0	0	0	0	0	0	0	0	5	1
WP: Wang Chien-Ming (1–0) LP: John Stephens (0–1) Sv: Tsao Chin-Hui (1S)

Team	1	2	3	4	5	6	7	8	9	R	H	E
Netherlands	1	2	0	0	0	0	0	0	0	3	4	1
Japan	1	1	0	0	2	0	0	4	x	8	11	1
WP: Hiroki Kuroda (1–0) LP: Diego Markwell (0–1); Home runs: NED: None; JPN: A. Fujimoto in 8th, 2 RBIs

Team	1	2	3	4	5	6	7	8	9	R	H	E
Italy	1	0	0	1	0	0	0	0	1	3	9	4
Canada	2	7	0	0	0	0	0	0	x	9	6	0
WP: Jason Dickson (1–0) LP: David Rollandini (0–1); Home runs: ITA: None; CAN: P. L. Laforest in 2nd, 3 RBIs

Team	1	2	3	4	5	6	7	8	9	R	H	E
Greece	0	0	0	1	0	0	0	0	3	4	3	1
Cuba	1	1	0	0	0	1	2	0	x	5	10	1
WP: Norge Luis Vera (1–0) LP: Jared Theodorakos (0–1) Sv: Pedro Luis Lazo (1S); Home runs: GRE: None; CUB: Frederich Cepeda in 2nd, 1 RBI; Michel Enríquez in 6th, 1 RBI; Ariel Pestano in 7th, 2 RBIs

August 17

Team	1	2	3	4	5	6	7	8	9	R	H	E
Canada	0	1	0	1	2	1	0	0	0	7	11	0
Netherlands	0	0	0	0	0	0	0	0	0	0	3	0
WP: Shawn Hill (1–0) LP: Patrick Beljaards (0–1); Home runs: CAN: P. Orr in 2nd, 3 RBIs; P. L. Laforest in 3rd, 1 RBI; R. Clapp in 4th, 1 RBI; NED: None

Team	1	2	3	4	5	6	7	8	9	R	H	E
Australia	0	0	0	0	0	0	2	4	0	6	12	0
Italy	0	0	0	0	0	0	0	0	0	0	1	1
WP: Chris Oxspring (1–0) LP: Michael Marchesano (0–1)

Team	1	2	3	4	5	6	7	8	9	R	H	E
Greece	0	0	0	0	0	0	1	0	0	1	3	1
Chinese Taipei	0	0	1	1	0	0	5	0	x	7	9	0
WP: Pan Wei-lun (1–0) LP: Peter Soteropoulos (0–1); Home runs: GRE: C. A. Harris in 7th, 1 RBI; TPE: Chen C. Y. in 3rd, 1 RBI

Team	1	2	3	4	5	6	7	8	9	R	H	E
Japan	0	2	0	2	0	0	1	0	1	6	12	2
Cuba	0	0	0	0	0	0	0	0	3	3	7	2
WP: Daisuke Matsuzaka (1–0) LP: Vicyohandri Odelín (0–1) Sv: Hirotoshi Ishii (1S); Home runs: JPN: Kenji Johjima in 4th, 1 RBI; Norihiro Nakamura in 4th, 1 RBI; Kazuhiro Wada in 2nd, 2 RBIs; CUB: None

August 18

Team	1	2	3	4	5	6	7	8	9	R	H	E
Italy	0	1	0	1	2	1	0	0	0	4	8	1
Netherlands	2	0	1	0	0	3	2	2	x	10	14	1
WP: Patrick de Lange (1–0) LP: Kaseygarret Olenberger (0–1); Home runs: ITA: J. Ramos Gizzi in 4th, 1 RBI; NED: S. Adriana in 3rd, 1 RBI

Team	1	2	3	4	5	6	7	8	9	R	H	E
Canada	1	0	0	0	0	0	1	0	0	2	5	0
Greece	0	0	0	0	0	0	0	0	0	0	4	3
WP: Paul Spoljaric (1–0) LP: Meleti Ross Melehes (0–1) Sv: Aaron Myette

Team	1	2	3	4	5	6	7	8	9	R	H	E
Australia	0	0	0	3	0	0	3	3	0	9	15	1
Japan	0	0	0	1	3	0	0	0	0	4	9	1
WP: Ryan Rowland-Smith (1–0) LP: Daisuke Miura (0–1) Sv: Jeff Williams (1S); Home runs: AUS: D. Nilsson in 8th, 1 RBI; JPN: K. Fukudome in 5th, 3 RBIs

Team	1	2	3	4	5	6	7	8	9	R	H	E
Cuba	0	1	2	0	0	0	0	5	2	10	15	1
Chinese Taipei	0	0	0	0	0	0	0	1	1	2	6	1
WP: Luis Borroto (1–0) LP: Tu Chang-wei (0–1) Sv: Danny Betancourt (1S); Home runs: CUB: Eriel Sánchez in 2nd, 1 RBI; TPE: None

August 20

Team	1	2	3	4	5	6	7	8	9	R	H	E
Italy	0	0	1	1	0	1	0	0	2	5	7	0
Chinese Taipei	0	0	1	0	2	0	1	0	0	4	8	0
WP: Peter Nyari (1–0) LP: Yang Chien-Fu (0–1); Home runs: ITA: M. Chiarini in 4th, 1 RBI; J. Buccheri in 6th, 1 RBI; C. Liverziani in 9th, 2 RBIs; TPE: Peng C. M. in 7th, 1 RBI

Team	1	2	3	4	5	6	7	8	9	R	H	E
Greece	3	1	0	0	0	1	0	1	0	6	14	0
Australia	0	0	3	0	0	2	5	1	x	11	10	0
WP: Ryan Rowland-Smith (2–0) LP: Sean Spencer (0–1); Home runs: GRE: Peter Maestrales in 2nd, 1 RBI; J. Kavourias in 8th, 1 RBI; AUS: B. Roneberg in 3rd; P. Gonzalez in 3rd, 2 RBIs; G. Roneberg in 6th, 1 RBI; 1 RBI; B. Kingman in 7th, 3 RBIs

Team	1	2	3	4	5	6	7	8	9	R	H	E
Canada	0	0	0	0	0	0	0	0	1	1	5	1
Japan	2	1	1	3	1	0	0	1	x	9	11	0
WP: Tsuyoshi Wada (1–0) LP: Mike Johnson (1–1); Home runs: CAN: None; JPN: Y. Takahashi in 1st, 2 RBIs; Y. Tani in 2nd, 1 RBI; Kazuhiro Wada in 4th, 2 RBIs

Team	1	2	3	4	5	6	7	8	9	R	H	E
Netherlands	0	0	0	0	0	0	0	1	1	2	5	0
Cuba	0	0	5	0	4	0	0	0	x	9	12	0
WP: Adiel Palma (1–0) LP: Eelco Jansen (0–1); Home runs: NED: Evert-Jan 't Hoen in 8th, 1 RBI; Yurendell DeCaster 9th, 1 RBI; CUB: None

August 21

Team	1	2	3	4	5	6	7	8	9	R	H	E
Chinese Taipei	0	0	3	0	0	0	0	0	0	3	10	1
Japan	0	0	0	0	0	3	0	0	1	4	10	0
WP: Hiroki Kuroda (2–0) LP: Tsao Chin-Hui (0–1–1); Home runs: TPE: Chen C. F. in 3rd, 3 RBIs; JPN: Y. Takahashi in 7th, 2 RBIs

Team	1	2	3	4	5	6	7	R	H	E
Australia	9	5	5	1	0	2	0	22	17	2
Netherlands	0	1	0	0	1	0	0	2	4	1
WP: Craig Lewis (1–0) LP: Calvin Maduro (0–2); Home runs: AUS: B. Roneberg in 1st, 2 RBIs; R. van Buizen in 3rd, 4 RBIs; G. Fingleson in 2nd, 3 RBIs; G. Williams in 6th, 2 RBIs; NED: Yurendell DeCaster in 2nd, 1 RBI; R. Millard in 5th, 1 RBI

Team	1	2	3	4	5	6	7	8	9	R	H	E
Cuba	0	3	0	0	1	0	0	1	0	5	10	0
Canada	0	0	0	0	0	0	2	0	0	2	7	1
WP: Norberto González (1–0) LP: Jason Dickson (1–1) Sv: Pedro Luis Lazo (2S); Home runs: CUB: Antonio Scull in 2nd, 2 RBIs; CAN: None

Team	1	2	3	4	5	6	7	8	9	R	H	E
Greece	0	0	0	2	2	2	4	0	2	12	14	3
Italy	0	1	4	0	1	1	0	0	0	7	14	1
WP: Panagiotis Sikaras (1–0) LP: W. E. Lucena (0–1); Home runs: GRE: C. Bellinger in 6th, 1 RBI; N. Markakis in 7th, 3 RBIs; C. A. Harris in 9th, 1 RBI; ITA: J. Ramos Gizzi in 2nd, 1 RBI

August 22

Team	1	2	3	4	5	6	7	8	9	R	H	E
Chinese Taipei	0	1	0	1	0	1	2	0	0	5	9	1
Netherlands	0	0	0	1	0	0	0	0	0	1	1	6
WP: Pan Wei-lun (2–0) LP: Patrick de Lange (1–1); Home runs: TPE: None; NED: E. Kingsale in 4th, 1 RBI

Team	1	2	3	4	5	6	7	8	9	R	H	E
Cuba	0	3	1	0	0	0	0	1	0	5	11	0
Italy	0	0	0	0	0	0	0	0	0	0	2	1
WP: Luis Borroto (2–0) LP: Michael Marchesano (0–2)

Team	1	2	3	4	5	6	7	8	9	R	H	E
Japan	0	1	0	0	0	1	4	0	0	6	13	0
Greece	0	0	0	0	0	0	1	0	0	1	4	1
WP: Naoyuki Shimizu (1–0) LP: Meleti Ross Melehes (0–2); Home runs: JPN: K. Fukudome in 7th, 2 RBIs; Y. Takahashi in 7th, 2 RBIs; GRE: E. D. Pappas in 7th, 1 RBI

Team	1	2	3	4	5	6	7	8	9	R	H	E
Canada	0	0	3	2	0	0	0	0	6	11	12	0
Australia	0	0	0	0	0	0	0	0	0	0	4	2
WP: Phil Devey (1–0) LP: Adrian Burnside (0–1); Home runs: CAN: J. Ware in 9th, 3 RBIs; R. Radmanovich in 4th, 2 RBIs; AUS: None

=== Semifinals ===
Team	1	2	3	4	5	6	7	8	9	R	H	E
Australia	0	0	0	0	0	1	0	0	0	1	5	2
Japan	0	0	0	0	0	0	0	0	0	0	5	0
WP: Chris Oxspring (2–0) LP: Daisuke Matsuzaka (1–1) Sv: Jeff Williams (2S)

Team	1	2	3	4	5	6	7	8	9	R	H	E
Canada	0	0	1	0	2	0	0	0	2	5	9	1
Cuba	2	0	0	0	0	0	0	6	x	8	13	2
WP: Danny Betancourt (1–0–1) LP: Chris Begg (0–1) Sv: Norberto González (1–0–1); Home runs: CAN: R. Radmanovich in 9th, 1 RBI; CUB: None

=== Bronze medal match ===
Team	1	2	3	4	5	6	7	8	9	R	H	E
Japan	2	0	4	1	0	0	0	4	0	11	13	0
Canada	0	0	0	1	1	0	0	0	0	2	5	0
WP: Tsuyoshi Wada (2–0) LP: Mike Johnson (1–2); Home runs: JPN: Kenji Johjima in 1st, 2 RBIs; CAN: J. Ware in 5th, 1 RBI

=== Final ===
Team	1	2	3	4	5	6	7	8	9	R	H	E
Cuba	0	0	0	2	0	4	0	0	0	6	13	1
Australia	0	0	0	0	1	0	0	1	0	2	7	0
WP: Adiel Palma (3–0) LP: John Stephens (0–2) Sv: Danny Betancourt (1–0–2); Home runs: CUB: Frederich Cepeda in 4th, 2 RBIs; AUS: Paul Gonzalez in 5th, 1 RBI

== Final standing ==
Place	Team
Gold	Cuba
Silver	Australia
Bronze	Japan
4.	Canada
5.	Chinese Taipei
6.	Netherlands
7.	Greece
8.	Italy

2004 Olympic champions

Cuba
3rd title

== Statistical leaders ==
=== Batting ===
Statistic	Name	Total/Avg
Batting average*	(Japan) Shinya Miyamoto	.440
Hits	(Japan) Shinya Miyamoto	11
Hits	(Australia) Glenn Williams	11
Runs	(Japan) Atsushi Fujimoto	7
Runs	(Japan) Kosuke Fukudome	7
Runs	(Japan) Yoshinobu Takahashi	7
Doubles	(Italy) Jim Buccheri	4
Triples	9 tied with	1
Home runs	(Netherlands) Yurendell DeCaster	3
Home runs	(Australia) Brett Roneberg	3
Runs batted in	(Australia) Gavin Fingleson	9
Runs batted in	(Cuba) Ariel Pestano	9
Runs batted in	(Australia) Rodney Van Buizen	9
Walks	(Chinese Taipei) Cheng-Min Peng	7
Stolen bases	(Chinese Taipei) Cheng-Min Peng	3
On-base percentage*	(Canada) Pete Laforest	.542
Slugging percentage*	(Canada) Pete Laforest	.778
OPS*	(Canada) Pete Laforest	1.320

* Minimum 2.7 plate appearances per team game

=== Pitching ===
Statistic	Name	Total/Avg
Wins	(Japan) Hiroki Kuroda	2
Wins	(Cuba) Adiel Palma	2
Wins	(Australia) Ryan Rowland-Smith	2
Saves	(Cuba) Pedro Lazo	2
Innings pitched	(Chinese Taipei) Chien-Ming Wang	13.2
Earned run average*	9 tied with	0.00
Strikeouts	(Chinese Taipei) Chang Chih-chia	18
Walks allowed*	(Canada) Chris Begg	0
Walks allowed*	(Cuba) Norberto González	0
Walks allowed*	(Japan) Hirotoshi Ishii	0
BAA*	(Australia) Chris Oxspring	.042

* Minimum 0.8 innings pitched per team game

== See also ==
- Softball at the 2004 Summer Olympics
