= Takuya Kimura (baseball) =

Japanese baseball player

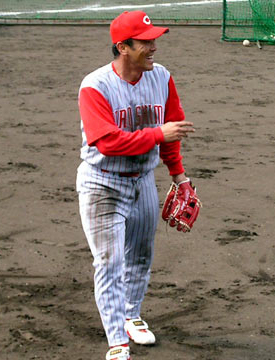
- Utility player
- Born: April 15, 1972; Miyazaki, Miyazaki, Japan
- Died: April 7, 2010 (aged 37); Hiroshima, Japan
- Batted: Switch Threw: Right

Nippon Professional Baseball debut
- 1992, for the Nippon-Ham Fighters

Last appearance
- 2009, for the Yomiuri Giants

Nippon Professional Baseball statistics (through 2009)
- Batting average: .262
- Home runs: 53
- RBI: 280

Teams
- Nippon-Ham Fighters (1992–1994); Hiroshima Toyo Carp (1995–2005); Yomiuri Giants (2006–2009)

Career highlights and awards
- 2009 Japan Series champion

Olympic medal record

Men's Baseball
Bronze medal – third place	2004 Athens	Team competition

Takuya Kimura (木村 拓也, Kimura Takuya; April 15, 1972 – April 7, 2010) was a Japanese baseball player for the Yomiuri Giants. He previously played for the Hiroshima Toyo Carp before being traded to the Giants in 2006. He played for the Giants through the 2009 season before retiring as a player, returning to the Giants for 2010 in a coaching capacity.

Kimura was born in Miyazaki, Miyazaki, Japan. He joined the Nippon-Ham Fighters from outside the amateur draft in 1990 after graduating from high school, and went on to become the leading utility player in Japanese baseball. His solid hitting, speed, and strong arm made him a valuable offensive and defensive player. He played games at every single position except pitcher, catching four games in the 1999 season. He played first base for one game in 1998. He was registered as an outfielder, but played more games in the infield in recent years. In 2004, he was recruited for the Athens Olympics for his skills as a utility player.

He had the same name as Takuya Kimura of the popular Japanese pop group, SMAP. He once made an appearance on the television show SMAP×SMAP, hosted by his namesake.

On April 2, 2010, at Hiroshima's Mazda Stadium preceding a game against the Hiroshima Toyo Carp, Kimura was hitting practice knocks to infielders when he suddenly collapsed and was rushed to hospital in a coma. He was diagnosed with subarachnoid hemorrhage and died in Hiroshima, Japan, on April 7, 2010. He died at age 37.
