= Rodney van Buizen =

American baseball player

Medal record

Representing Australia

Men's Baseball

Olympic Games
Silver medal – second place	2004 Athens	Team competition

Rodney van Buizen (born 25 September 1980) is an Australian former professional baseball player.

== Career ==
In 2004, he was part of the Australian Olympic baseball team, who achieved a silver medal in the baseball tournament at the Athens Olympics. He was equal third in the competition for runs batted in. Van Buizen continues to participate in baseball as a player with the Manly Eagles in the Sydney Major League.
