= Adiel Palma =

Cuban baseball player

- Pitcher
- Born: August 20, 1970 (age 56); Cuba
- Bats: Left Throws: Left
Medals
Men's baseball
Representing Cuba
World Baseball Classic
Silver medal – second place	2006 San Diego	Team
Olympic Games
Gold medal – first place	2004 Athens	Team
Silver medal – second place	2008 Beijing	Team
Baseball World Cup
Gold medal – first place	2003 Havana	Team
Gold medal – first place	2005 Rotterdam	Team
Silver medal – second place	2007 Taipei	Team
Pan American Games
Gold medal – first place	2003 Santo Domingo	Team
Gold medal – first place	2007 Rio de Janeiro	Team
Central American and Caribbean Games
Gold medal – first place	2006 Cartagena	Team

Adiel Palma López (born August 20, 1970) is a Cuban left-handed pitcher for the Cuban national baseball team and Cienfuegos of the Cuban National Series. Palma was on the gold medal-winning Cuban team at the 2004 Summer Olympics and the silver medal-winning team at the 2006 World Baseball Classic.

During the 2005-06 Cuban National Series, Palma was only 5–9 with a 5.02 ERA, but did strike out 109 batters in only 123 2/3 innings. He has currently been living in Italy for several years, as a baseball coach for a team in Nettuno (Rome).
