= Danny Betancourt =

Cuban baseball player

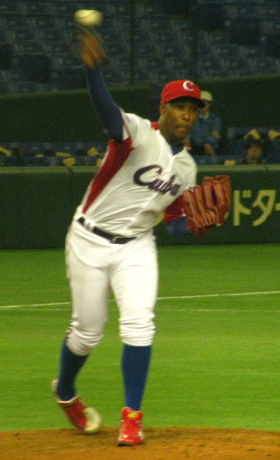
- Betancourt pitching for the Cuba national team in 2013 World Baseball Classic

Personal information
- Born: May 27, 1981 (age 45)
Medal record
Men's baseball
Representing Cuba
Summer Olympics
Gold medal – first place	2004 Athens	Team
Baseball World Cup
Gold medal – first place	2005 Rotterdam	Team

Danny Betancourt Chacón (born May 27, 1981 in Santiago de Cuba, Cuba) is a right-handed Olympian baseball pitcher who has played for Santiago de Cuba in the Cuban National Series, as well as the Cuba national baseball team. He was on the Cuba national baseball team that brought home a gold medal from 2004 Summer Olympics, in Athens.
