= Brett Roneberg =

Australian professional baseball player

- Outfield
- Born: 5 February 1979 (age 47); Melbourne, Australia
- Bats: Left Throws: Left
- Stats at Baseball Reference
Medals
Representing Australia
Men's Baseball
Olympic Games
Silver medal – second place	Athens 2004	Team competition

Brett Roneberg (born 5 February 1979 in Sandringham, Victoria) is an Australian former professional baseball player.

== Career ==
Roneberg spent 11 seasons playing Minor League Baseball, most recently in 2007 was with the Pittsburgh Pirates organization, playing for their Double-A affiliate, the Altoona Curve.

His most productive season in the minors came in 2001, when he posted a combined batting average of .287 with 16 home runs and 82 RBI in 137 games for Class A+ Brevard County Manatees and Double-A Class Portland Sea Dogs.

Roneberg represented Australia at the 2000 Summer Olympics and batted for a .333 average. In 2004 he was part of the Australian Olympic baseball team, which achieved a silver medal in the baseball tournament at the Athens Olympics. Again he batted well with a .360 average.

In the 2009 World Baseball Classic, Roneberg led the tournament in average (.714), slugging percentage (1.286), and on-base plus slugging (2.036).

In between, Roneberg played winter ball with the Leones del Caracas and Pastora de los Llanos clubs of the Venezuelan Professional Baseball League in parts of two seasons spanning 2004–2006.

== Baseball retirement ==
After retiring from playing professional baseball, Roneberg now plays in a small baseball league in Cairns called CBL [Cairns Baseball League] as a breakthrough Bandits player.
