= Atsushi Fujimoto =

Japanese baseball player (born 1977)

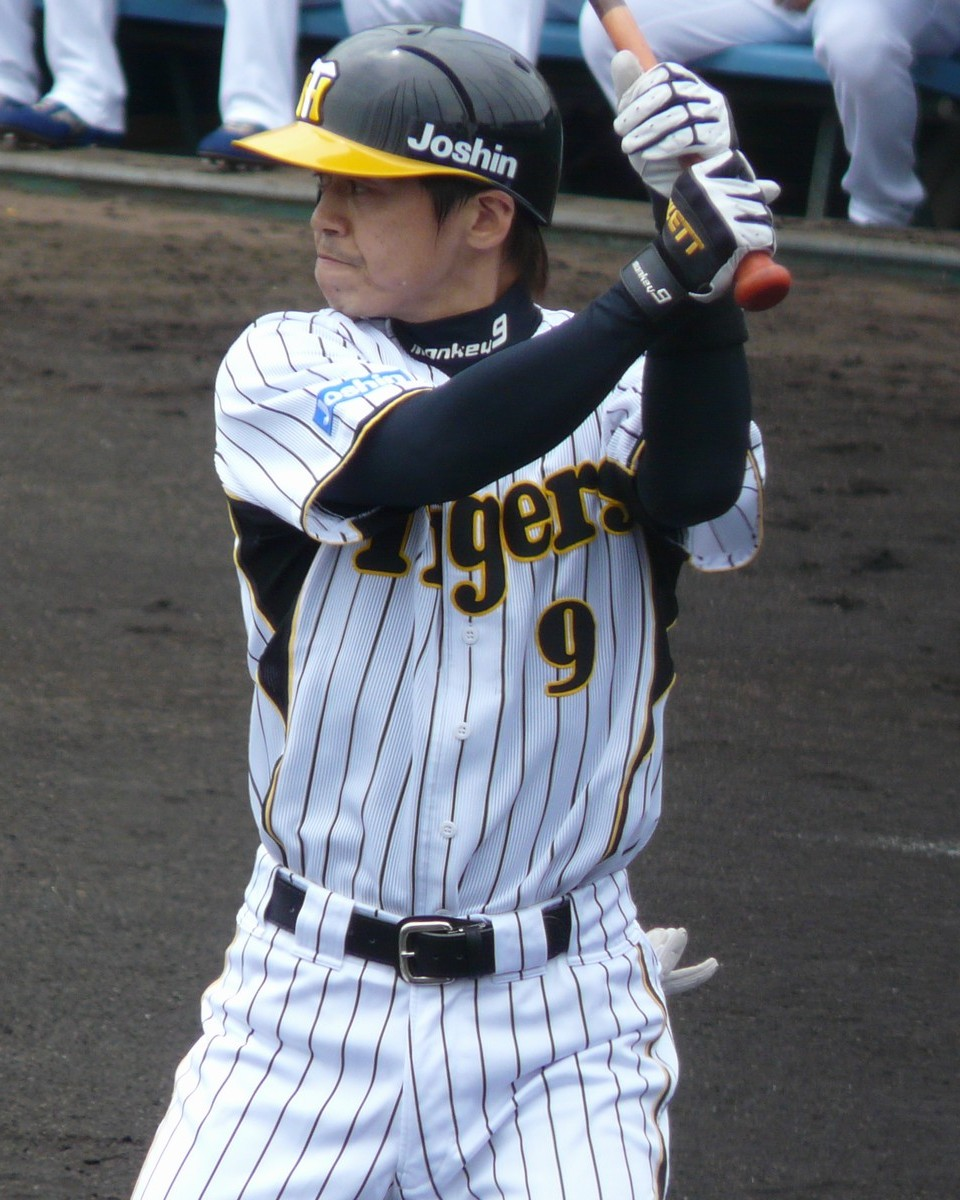

Hanshin Tigers – No. 74
- Infielder / Coach
- Born: October 4, 1977 (age 48); Akashi, Hyōgo, Japan
- Batted: Left Threw: Right

NPB debut
- April 14, 2001, for the Hanshin Tigers

Last NPB appearance
- September 24, 2013, for the Tokyo Yakult Swallows

NPB statistics (through 2013 season)
- Batting average: .251
- Run batted in: 208
- Hits: 519
- Stats at Baseball Reference

Teams
- As player: Hanshin Tigers (2001–2009); Tokyo Yakult Swallows (2010–2013); As coach: Hanshin Tigers (2015–present)
Medals
Men's baseball
Representing Japan
Olympics
Bronze medal – third place	Athens 2004	Team competition

Atsushi Fujimoto (藤本 敦士, Fujimoto Atsushi; born October 4, 1977) is a former professional baseball player from Akashi, Hyōgo, Japan. After a nine-year career for the Hanshin Tigers, Fujimoto finished his career with the Tokyo Yakult Swallows before retiring at the end of the 2013 season. On 6 November 2014 it was announced that Fujimoto will return to Hanshin as an infield and baserunning coach for the farm team.

He joined the Japanese Olympic baseball team for the 2004 Summer Olympics, and won a bronze medal. He played in every inning of every game in the olympic tournament for the Japanese team.
