= Craig Lewis (baseball) =

Australian baseball player

Olympic medal record

Men's Baseball

Representing Australia
Silver medal – second place	2004 Athens	Team competition

Craig Edward Lewis (born 30 December 1976) is an Australian former baseball player.

In 2004, he was part of the Australian Olympic baseball team, who achieved a silver medal in the baseball tournament at the Athens Olympics.
