= Adrian Burnside =

Australian former baseball player

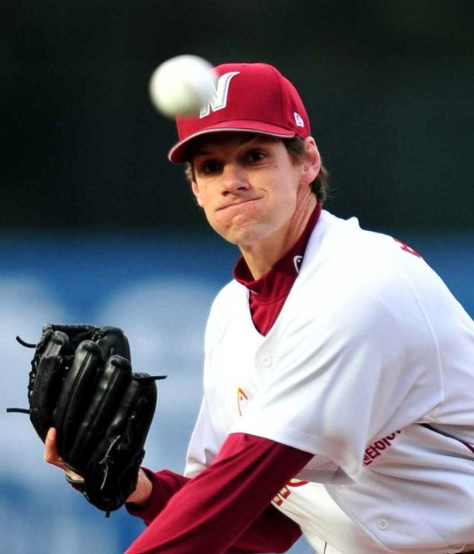
- Pitcher
- Born: 15 March 1977 (age 48); Alice Springs, Northern Territory, Australia
- Batted: Right Threw: Left

Professional debut
- NPB: 26 May, 2008, for the Yomiuri Giants
- KBO: 30 March, 2010, for the Nexen Heroes
- CPBL: 25 March, 2011, for the Lamigo Monkeys

Last appearance
- NPB: 11 October, 2008, for the Yomiuri Giants
- KBO: 17 September, 2010, for the Nexen Heroes
- CPBL: 2011, for the Lamigo Monkeys

NPB statistics
- Win–loss record: 5–3
- Earned run average: 3.48
- Strikeouts: 47
- Stats at Baseball Reference

Teams
- Yomiuri Giants (2008 – 2009); Nexen Heroes (2010); Lamigo Monkeys (2011)
Medals
Men's baseball
Representing Australia
Olympics
Silver medal – second place	Athens 2004	Team

Adrian Mark Burnside (born 15 March 1977) is an Australian former baseball player born in Alice Springs.

He was a member of the Australian Olympic baseball team, which achieved a silver medal in the baseball tournament at the 2004 Summer Olympics in Athens. He later played for the Lamigo Monkeys in the Chinese Professional Baseball League in Taiwan.

== Early years ==
In 1995, Burnside was selected for the Australian national junior baseball team to compete in the World Junior Baseball Championship held in Cape Cod, Massachusetts. There he helped his team to win its fifth bronze medal, racking up three wins.

== Minor league career ==
During his Minor league baseball career he played under the Los Angeles Dodgers at Rookie, A-A and AA level, Pittsburgh Pirates at AA level, Detroit Tigers AA and AAA level, Toronto Blue Jays at AAA level, and the San Diego Padres at AA and AAA level.
