= Ryosuke Fukamachi =

Japanese baseball player (born 1984)

- Pitcher
- Born: October 25, 1984 (age 41); Nagoya, Aichi, Japan
- Bats: Right Throws: Right

debut
- April 14, 2007, for the Yomiuri Giants

Career statistics (through 2008)
- Win–loss: 0–0
- ERA: 54.00
- Strikeouts: 0

Teams
- Yomiuri Giants (2007–2008)

Ryosuke Fukamachi (born October 25, 1984) appeared in one game for the Yomiuri Giants of Nippon Professional Baseball in 2007, allowing two earned runs and posting a 54.00 ERA in 1/3 of an inning. He batted and threw right handed, attended Chukyodai Chukyo High School and then Chukyo University. He was born in Nagoya, Aichi, Japan.
