= Michel Enríquez =

Cuban baseball player (born 1979)

- Infielder / Coach
- Born: 11 February 1979 (age 47); Nueva Gerona, Isla de la Juventud, Cuba
- Bats: Right Throws: Right

Teams
- Isla de la Juventud (1998–2019)
Medals
Men's baseball
Representing Cuba
World Baseball Classic
Silver medal – second place	2006 San Diego	Team
Olympic Games
Gold medal – first place	2004 Athens	Team
Silver medal – second place	2008 Beijing	Team
Baseball World Cup
Gold medal – first place	2001 Taipei	Team
Gold medal – first place	2003 Havana	Team
Gold medal – first place	2005 Rotterdam	Team
Silver medal – second place	2009 Nettuno	Team
Intercontinental Cup
Silver medal – second place	1999 Sydney	Team
Gold medal – first place	2002 Havana	Team
Gold medal – first place	2006 Taichung	Team
Gold medal – first place	2010 Taichung	Team
Pan American Games
Gold medal – first place	1999 Winnipeg	Team
Gold medal – first place	2003 Santo Domingo	Team
Bronze medal – third place	2011 Guadalajara	Team
Central American and Caribbean Games
Gold medal – first place	2006 Cartagena	Team

Michel Enríquez Tamayo (born 11 February 1979) is a Cuban former professional baseball infielder who most recently served as the hitting coach for Caliente de Durango of the Mexican League.

== Biography and career ==
Enríquez was born on 11 February 1979 in Nueva Gerona, Isla de la Juventud. He played third base for Isla de la Juventud in the Cuban National Series. He led the league in batting average and slugging percentage in the 2005-06 season, at .447 and .690, respectively. Enríquez is a roster fixture at third base for the Cuban national baseball team.

He holds National Series records for hits (152) and doubles (35) in a season (1999, 90 games), and was part of Cuba's gold medal-winning team at the 2004 Summer Olympics and the second place team at the 2006 World Baseball Classic. He has one brother and one sister.

Enríquez was left off of Cuba's roster for the 2000 Olympics, with some speculating fear of defection and others opining that it was due to Enríquez's youth (still just 21 years old) and lack of experience in international tournaments relative to some of the other available options. He hit .353/.451/.595 in the 2000-2001 Serie Nacional.

On 13 June 2013, Enríquez signed with the Piratas de Campeche of the Mexican League. In seven appearances for Campeche, he batted .240/.321/.240 with two RBI and three walks. Enríquez was released by the Piratas on June 24.

In 2017, while playing for Vegueros de Pinar del Río, Enríquez collected his 2000th professional hit.

Enríquez has worked as a coach for several Mexican teams: Algodoneros de Unión Laguna in the Mexican Baseball League (LMB) and Cañeros de Los Mochis and Águilas de Mexicali in the Mexican Pacific League. He left Unión Laguna after the 2024 season.

On May 25, 2025, Enríquez joined the Caliente de Durango of the Mexican League as the team's hitting coach. On June 11, 2026, Enríquez was fired by the team.
