= Masakazu Fukukawa =

Japanese baseball player and coach (born 1976)

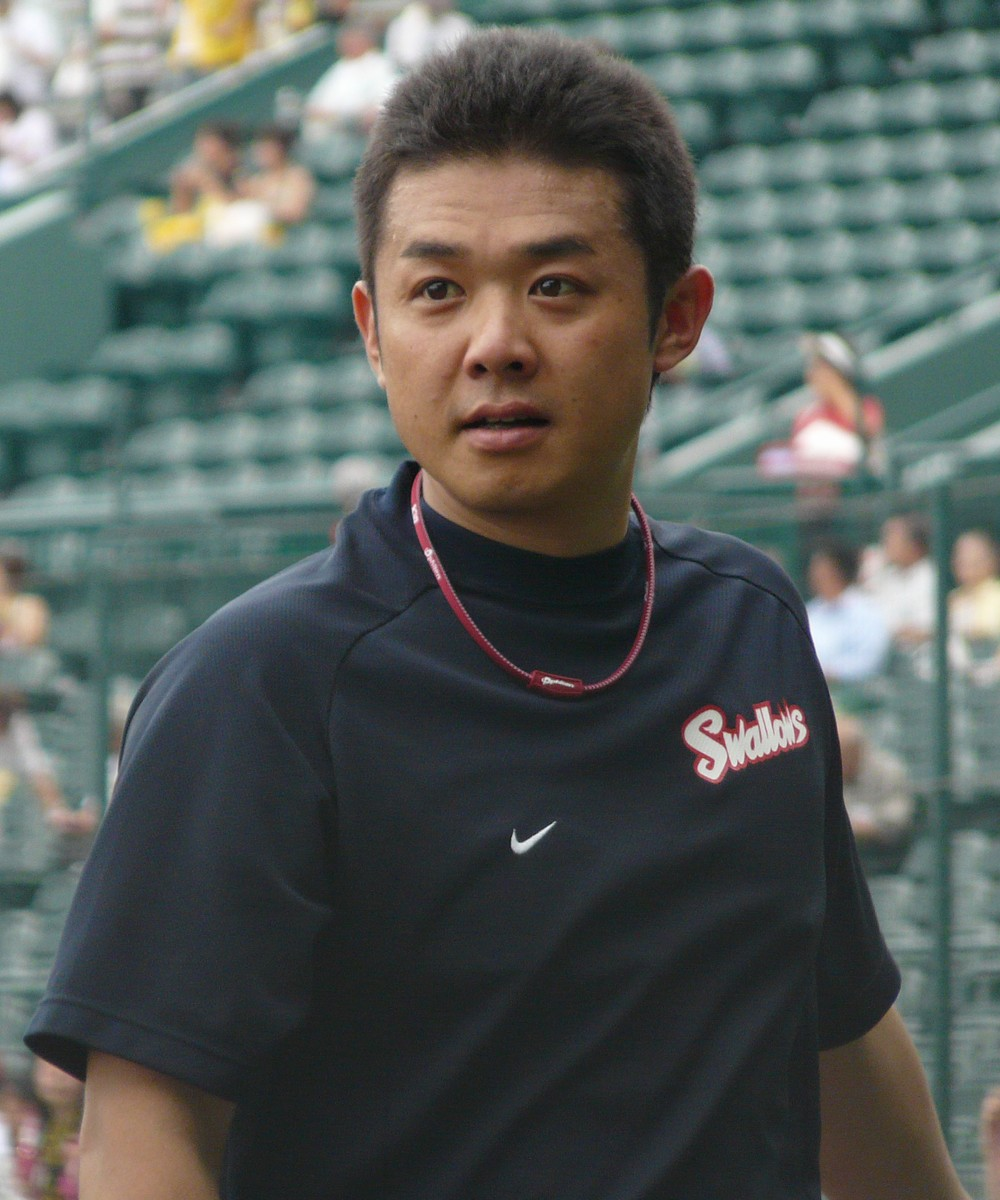

Orix Buffaloes – No. 79
- Catcher / Coach
- Born: July 31, 1957; Osaka, Osaka, Japan
- Batted: Right Threw: Right

NPB debut
- April 5, 2003, for the Yakult Swallows

Last appearance
- September 22, 2012, for the Tokyo Yakult Swallows

NPB statistics
- Batting average: .212
- Hits: 136
- Home runs: 19
- Runs batted in: 86
- Stolen base: 2

Teams
- As player: Yakult Swallows/Tokyo Yakult Swallows (2002–2012); As coach: Tokyo Yakult Swallows (2019–2024); Orix Buffaloes (2025–present)
- Last updated on: January 3 2025

Masakazu Fukukawa (福川 将和, Fukukawa Masakazu; born December 29, 1976) is a Japanese former Nippon Professional Baseball catcher.
