= Frederich Cepeda =

Cuban baseball player (born 1980)

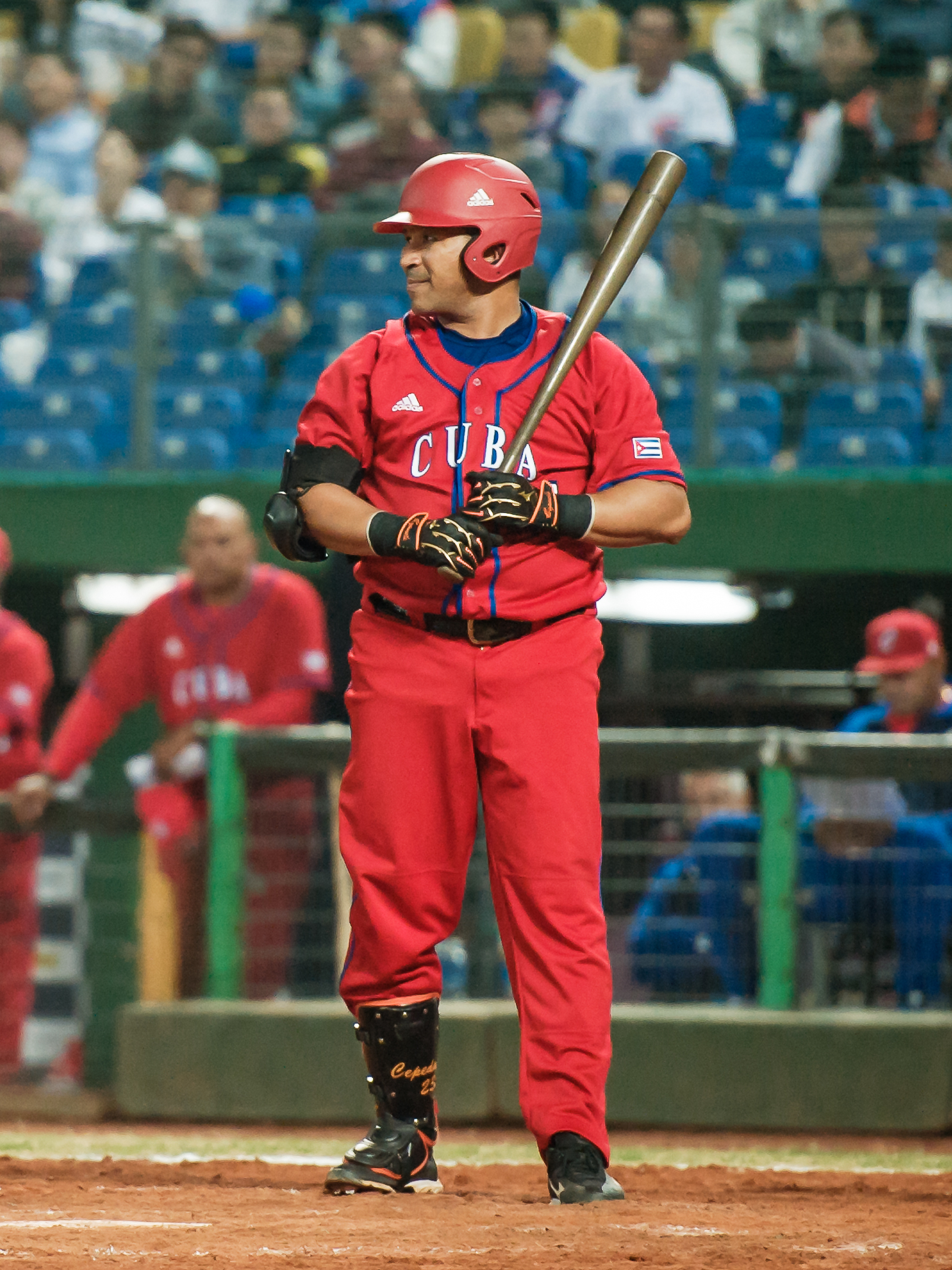
- Cepeda in 2017

Gallos de Sancti Spíritus – No. 24
- Outfielder
- Born: 13 April 1980 (age 45); Trinidad, Sancti Spíritus Province, Cuba
- Bats: Switch Throws: Right

CNS debut
- 27 April, 1998, for the Gallos de Sancti Spiritus

CNS statistics (through 2024)
- Batting average: .335
- Home runs: 307
- Runs batted in: 1,207
- Stats at Baseball Reference

Teams
- Gallos de Sancti Spíritus (1998–2015, 2016–present); Cazadores de Artemisa (2013-2014); Vegueros de Pinar del Rio (2017); Industriales de La Habana (2019)

Career highlights and awards
- All-World Baseball Classic Team (2009)
Medals
Men's baseball
Representing Cuba
World Baseball Classic
Silver medal – second place	2006 Puerto Rico	Team
Olympic Games
Gold medal – first place	2004 Athens	Team
Silver medal – second place	2008 Beijing	Team
Baseball World Cup
Gold medal – first place	2003 Havana	Team
Gold medal – first place	2005 Rotterdam	Team
Silver medal – second place	2007 Taipei	Team
Silver medal – second place	2009 Nettuno	Team
Intercontinental Cup
Gold medal – first place	2002 Havana	Team
Gold medal – first place	2006 Taichung	Team
Pan American Games
Gold medal – first place	2003 Santo Domingo	Team
Gold medal – first place	2007 Rio Janeiro	Team
Bronze medal – third place	2011 Guadalajara	Team
Bronze medal – third place	2015 Toronto	Team
Central American and Caribbean Games
Gold medal – first place	2006 Cartagena	Team
Gold medal – first place	2014 Veracruz	Team
Silver medal – second place	2018 Barranquilla	Team

Frederich Cepeda Cruz (born 8 April 1980) is a Cuban professional baseball outfielder for the Gallos de Sancti Spiritus of the Cuban National Series. He also played in Nippon Professional Baseball (NPB) for the Yomiuri Giants.

== Career ==
=== Yomiuri Giants ===
Cepeda signed with the Yomiuri Giants of Nippon Professional Baseball on 19 April 2014. In parts of 2 seasons with Yomiuri, Cepeda slashed .163/.319/.326 with 6 home runs and 19 RBI.

=== Toros de Tijuana ===
On 13 August 2018, Cepeda signed with the Toros de Tijuana of the Mexican League. Cepeda did not play in a game in 2020 due to the cancellation of the Mexican League season because of the COVID-19 pandemic. On February 12, 2021, Cepeda was traded to El Águila de Veracruz of the Mexican League, a new expansion team. However, the contract was later voided due to monetary concerns and Cepeda became a free agent.

== International career ==
Cepeda previously played for the Cuban national baseball team and Sancti Spíritus of the Cuban National Series. Cepeda was part of the Cuban team that won the gold medal at the 2004 Summer Olympics and second place at the 2006 World Baseball Classic and 2008 Summer Olympics. He was selected as part of the All Stars at the 2009 World Baseball Classic where he had a .500 batting average with 3 homers in 6 games and 24 at-bats.

Cepeda won with his national team, the gold medal of the 2014 Central American and Caribbean Games in Veracruz, Mexico.
