= Andrew McNally (baseball) =

Australian baseball player (born 1973)

Personal information
- Born: 3 December 1973 (age 52) Perth, Western Australia, Australia

Sport
- Country: Australia
- Sport: Baseball

Andrew James McNally (born 3 December 1973) is an Australian baseball player. He represented Australia at the 1996 Summer Olympics.
