= Paul Gonzalez =

American baseball executive (born 1969)

Medal record

Representing Australia

Men's baseball

Olympic Games
Silver medal – second place	Athens 2004	Team competition

Paul Gonzalez (born April 22, 1969) is an American baseball executive and former professional player. Currently the general manager of the Brisbane Bandits, he has played professional baseball in the United States, Japan, Italy and Australia. He also won a silver medal with the Australia national baseball team at the 2004 Olympics.

== Playing career ==
A native of Fort Worth, Texas, Gonzalez attended Texas Christian University. In 1989, he played collegiate summer baseball with the Yarmouth–Dennis Red Sox of the Cape Cod Baseball League and was named a league all-star.

Gonzalez was picked up in the 1990 amateur draft by the San Diego Padres and played for a variety of minor league teams including the High Desert Mavericks, Wichita Wranglers, Las Vegas Stars, Prince William Cannons, Abilene Prairie Dogs and the Birmingham Barons.

Gonzalez played in the Australian Baseball League and the International Baseball League of Australia for the Brisbane Bandits from 1992 until 1998 and Melbourne Monarchs in the 1998–1999 season. In total he made 227 appearances, boasting 48 home-runs and 168 RBI's, giving him a batting average of .304 and slugging .567.

In 2002 Gonzalez led the Claxton Shield and Queensland Rams batting with an average of .476 and slugging .857.

By 1999, he played for Orix BlueWave in Japan. In 2004, he was part of the Australian Olympic baseball team, which achieved a silver medal in the baseball tournament at the Athens Olympics.
