= John Stephens (2000s pitcher) =

Australian baseball player (born 1979)

- Pitcher
- Born: 15 November 1979 (age 46); Sydney, Australia
- Batted: Right Threw: Right

MLB debut
- 30 July, 2002, for the Baltimore Orioles

Last MLB appearance
- 29 September, 2002, for the Baltimore Orioles

MLB statistics
- Win–loss record: 2–5
- Earned run average: 6.09
- Strikeouts: 56
- Stats at Baseball Reference

Teams
- Baltimore Orioles (2002)

Member of the Australian

Baseball Hall of Fame
- Induction: 2017
Medals
Men's baseball
Representing Australia
Silver medal – second place	Athens 2004	Team

John M. Stephens (born 15 November 1979) is an Australian former professional baseball player. He pitched part of the 2002 season for the Baltimore Orioles, and last pitched in 2006 for the Reading Phillies. He also pitched for several years with the Australian national team, winning an Olympic silver medal in 2004. Stephens was a right-handed pitcher with a listed height of 6'1" and a listed weight of 204 pounds.

== Baseball career ==
=== Professional career ===
Stephens signed with the Baltimore Orioles as an amateur free agent on 3 July 1996. He was regarded as a top international prospect, but while fielding a bunt during a game in 1998, he sustained a neck injury which resulted in nerve damage to his shoulder. The injury sapped most of the velocity from his fastball, leaving him with a top speed between 82 and 86 miles per hour. By relying more heavily on his curveball and focusing on throwing strikes, Stephens was able to overcome this obstacle and re-establish himself as a prospect. His 217 strikeouts with the Delmarva Shorebirds in 1999 were the highest total in the entire minor leagues. He also set a Delmarva record by striking out 17 batters in a 5 June game against Charleston, and at the end of the year the Orioles honored him with the Jim Palmer Prize, an award given annually to the best pitcher in Baltimore's farm system.

Stephens was even more dominant in 2001. Playing for the Bowie Baysox, he was named the Eastern League Pitcher of the Year and Eastern League Player of the Month for June. He also made the league's All-Star team, pitching an inning of scoreless relief during the game. His 1.84 ERA led the league, he compiled a streak of 33 consecutive scoreless innings, and on 31 July he pitched a seven-inning no-hitter against the Harrisburg Senators. At the end of the season, the Orioles awarded him the Palmer Prize for the second time.

Stephens started the 2002 season with the class AAA Rochester Red Wings. Continued success brought him a spot on the World roster for the All-Star Futures Game, and on 30 July 2002, he made his major league debut with the Orioles, starting a game against the Tampa Bay Devil Rays. Stephens spent the remainder of the season in the Orioles' rotation, finishing the year with two wins, five losses, and a 6.09 ERA in 65 innings pitched. He maintained a strong strikeout rate after his promotion to the majors, but his performance was damaged by the 13 home runs he allowed. His performance may have been affected by complications related to a broken foot, which was not properly diagnosed until August. At the end of the year, the Orioles awarded him the Palmer Prize for the third time in four years.

Stephens struggled during spring training in 2003, and he was optioned back to Rochester after he failed to make the Orioles' 25-man roster. He went to camp with Baltimore again the next year, and on 8 April the Boston Red Sox claimed him on waivers and optioned him to Pawtucket. He pitched for Pawtucket in 2004, was cut by the Red Sox during spring training in 2005, then bounced between three AAA teams during the 2005 season. He returned to the Orioles system as a minor league free agent in 2006, but was released at midseason, before signing with the Phillies.

=== Amateur competition ===
As an Australian, Stephens has been called upon to represent his nation in several international competitions. He pitched for Australia during the 2004 Summer Olympics, in which Australia won a silver medal, its first for baseball in Olympic history. He was also a member of the Australian team in the 2006 World Baseball Classic.

== See also ==
- List of players from Australia in Major League Baseball
