= Esterlin Franco =

Esterlin Franco Hernandez (Sterling Franco) is a former baseball player in Japan. Esterlin was born in 1980 in the Dominican Republic. Esterlin went undrafted in the MLB draft. He played in the Hiroshima Carp in the Central League.
