= Chang Chih-chia =

Taiwanese baseball player (1980–2024)

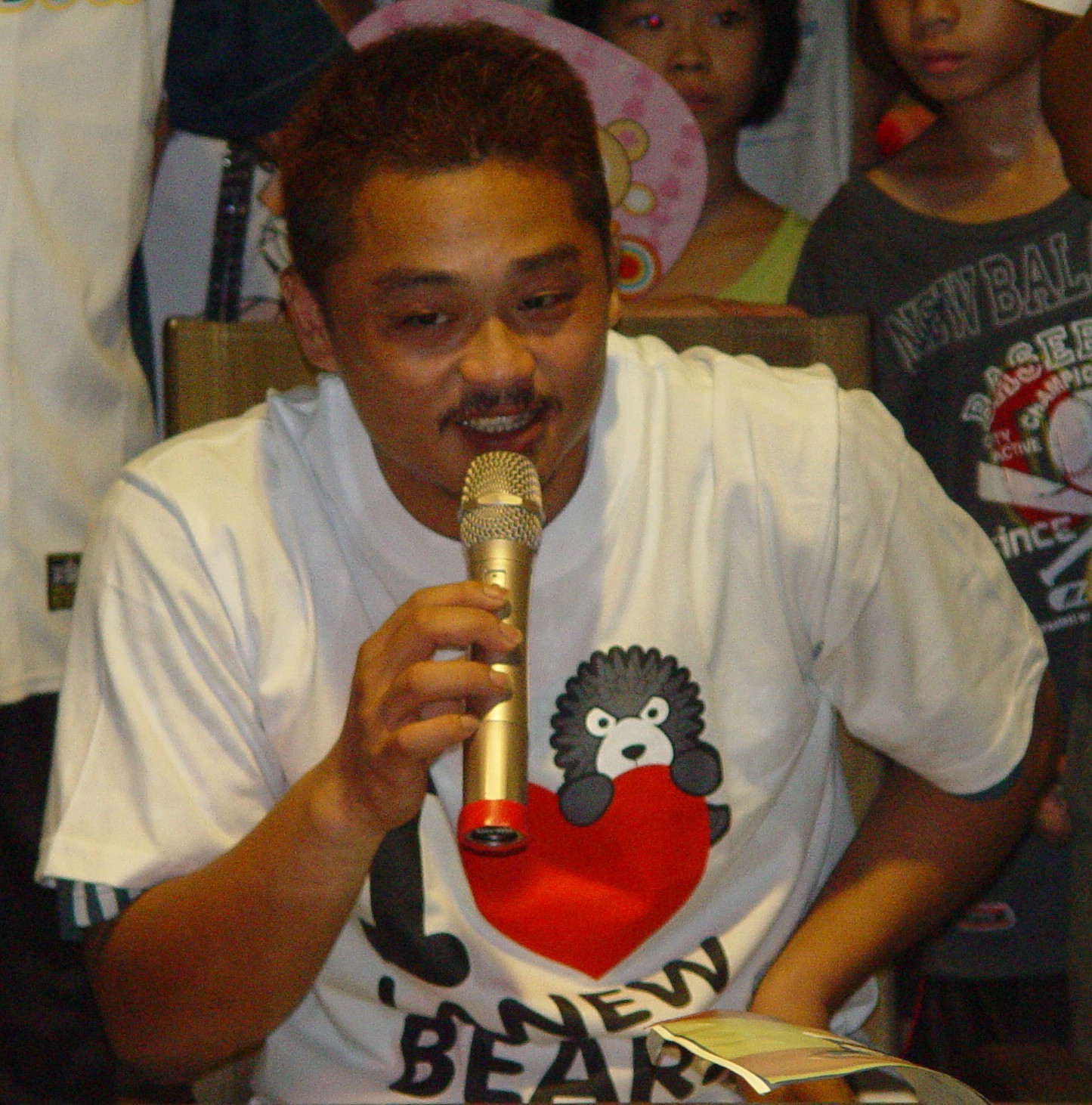
- Chang in 2009
- Pitcher
- Born: 6 May 1980; Xihu, Changhua, Taiwan
- Died: 1 January 2024 (aged 43); Shenzhen, Guangdong, China
- Batted: Right Threw: Right

NPB statistics
- Win–loss record: 26–19
- Earned run average: 3.81
- Strikeouts: 352

CPBL statistics
- Win–loss record: 13–13
- Earned run average: 4.14
- Strikeouts: 154
- Stats at Baseball Reference

Teams
- Seibu Lions (2002–2004); La New Bears (2008–2009)

Chang Chih-chia (Chinese: 張誌家; pinyin: Zhāng Zhìjiā; 6 May 1980 – 1 January 2024) was a Taiwanese baseball player who competed in the 2004 Summer Olympics and in the 2008 Summer Olympics.

== Career ==
Chang pitched professionally with the Seibu Lions of Nippon Professional Baseball and the La New Bears of the Chinese Professional Baseball League. Chang signed with the Seibu Lions after pitching in the 2001 Baseball World Cup, during which he pitched to a 4–0 win–loss record, a 0.36 ERA and 26 strikeouts in 25 1/3 innings. Chang's NPB contract included a signing bonus of ¥120 million (US$845,885), the largest signing bonus given to a Taiwanese NPB player. Chang pitched for the Lions from 2002 to 2004, and produced a 26–19 record, 352 strikeouts and a 3.81 ERA. During the 2002 NPB season, Chang set a league record by recording strikeouts in 28 consecutive innings. This record was later broken by Dennis Sarfate in 2015. Chang made his final NBP appearances in the 2004 season, and spent the rest of his Japanese baseball career in the minor leagues for injury rehabilitation, and was subsequently released in 2006. After recovering from his injuries, Chang returned to Taiwan to pitch for the Chinese Professional Baseball League's La New Bears from 2008 to 2009. He was linked to the 2009 Chinese Professional Baseball League scandal, and banned from the league later that season. Match-fixing allegations resulted in legal action against Chang. In 2014, the Taiwan High Court commuted Chang's four-month prison sentence to a NT$120,000 fine.

== Personal life ==
Following the end of his baseball career, Chang found work in Taichung as a chef, and also played golf. Chang died in Shenzhen, China, where he was playing softball, of a heart attack on 1 January 2024. He was 43.
