= Pat Flury =

American baseball player

- Pitcher
- Born: March 14, 1973 (age 52); Reno, Nevada, U.S.
- Batted: Right Threw: Right

NPB debut
- August 2, 2002, for the Nippon Ham Fighters

Last NPB appearance
- September 28, 2002, for the Nippon Ham Fighters

NPB statistics
- Win–loss record: 0–0
- Earned run average: 3.46
- Strikeouts: 19

Teams
- Nippon Ham Fighters (2002)

Patrick Shannon Flury (born March 14, 1973) is an American former professional baseball player who played in Nippon Professional Baseball and Minor League Baseball. He also played minor league ball under the Florida Marlins. He played with the Nippon Ham Fighters for the Pacific League. He coached for the Nevada Wolf Pack baseball team.
