= Michael Marchesano =

Italian baseball player (born 1975)

Mike Marchesano
- Pitcher
- Born: 23 September 1975 (age 50); Fort Wayne, Indiana, U.S.
- Bats: Right Throws: Right

CPBL statistics
- Win–loss record: 1–2
- Earned run average: 3.86
- Strikeouts: 17
- Stats at Baseball Reference

Teams
- Macoto Gida (2003)

Michael Patrick Marchesano (born 23 September 1975) is an Italian baseball player who competed in the 2004 Summer Olympics.

Marchesano participated in the 2003 Baseball World Cup in Cuba. He appeared in two games, pitching 12.2 innings with a 0.71 ERA, recording 11 strikeouts, earning a win against Russia and taking a loss against Chinese Taipei.
