= Baseball at the 2004 Summer Olympics – Team squads =

Below are the team squads for the Baseball at the 2004 Summer Olympics which took place in the Helliniko Olympic Complex, from August 15 to August 25.

The club listed is the club the player was with in 2004.

== Australia ==
Manager: 24 – Jon Deeble.

Coaches: 2 – Tony Harris, 33 – Paul Elliott, 34 – Philip Dale.

Pos.	No.	Player	Date of birth (age)	Bats	Throws	Club
P	3	Jeff Williams	6 June 1972 (aged 32)			(Japan) Hanshin Tigers
IF	4	Gavin Fingleson	5 August 1976 (aged 28)			(United States) New Haven County Cutters
OF	5	Brett Tamburrino	10 November 1981 (aged 22)			(United States) Fort Myers Miracle
IF	6	Rodney van Buizen	25 September 1981 (aged 22)			(United States) Vero Beach Dodgers
C	7	Andrew Utting	9 September 1977 (aged 26)			(Australia) Surfers Paradise
OF	8	Trent Oeltjen	28 February 1983 (aged 21)			(United States) Swing of the Quad Cities
OF	10	Nick Kimpton	27 October 1983 (aged 20)			(United States) Rancho Cucamonga Quakes
P	11	Ryan Rowland-Smith	26 January 1983 (aged 21)			(United States) Inland Empire 66ers
C	14	David Nilsson	14 December 1969 (aged 34)			(Australia) Redcliffe Padres
C	16	Ben Wigmore	17 January 1982 (aged 22)			(Australia) Kensington Cardinals
OF	17	Brett Roneberg	5 February 1979 (aged 25)			(United States) Pawtucket Red Sox
IF	18	Glenn Williams	18 July 1977 (aged 27)			(United States) Syracuse Sky Chiefs
P	19	Richard Thompson	1 July 1984 (aged 20)			(United States) Rancho Cucamonga Quakes
P	20	Wayne Ough	27 November 1973 (aged 30)			(United States) Binghamton Mets
IF	22	Brendan Kingman	22 May 1973 (aged 31)			(United States) Brockton Rox
IF	23	Paul Gonzalez	22 April 1969 (aged 35)			(Australia) Redcliffe Padres
OF	25	Thomas Brice	24 August 1981 (aged 22)			(United States) Kannapolis Intimidators
OF	26	Craig Lewis	30 December 1976 (aged 27)			(United States) Brockton Rox
P	27	Graeme Lloyd	9 April 1967 (aged 37)			
P	28	John Stephens	15 November 1979 (aged 24)			(United States) Pawtucket Red Sox
P	31	Craig Anderson	30 October 1980 (aged 23)			(United States) Tacoma Rainiers
P	35	Chris Oxspring	13 May 1977 (aged 27)			(United States) Portland Beavers
P	39	Phil Stockman	25 January 1980 (aged 24)			(United States) Tucson Sidewinders
P	40	Adrian Burnside	15 March 1977 (aged 27)			(United States) Toledo Mud Hens

== Canada ==
Manager: 12 – Ernie Whitt

Coaches: 42 – Denis Boucher, 7 – Marty Lehn, 10 – Greg Hamilton, 21 – Tim Leiper.

Pos.	No.	Player	Date of birth (age)	Bats	Throws	Club
OF	2	Rob Ducey	May 24, 1965 (aged 39)			
IF	4	Peter Orr	June 8, 1979 (aged 25)			(United States) Richmond Braves
IF	11	Richard Clapp	February 24, 1973 (aged 31)			(United States) Syracuse Sky Chiefs
P	13	Phil Devey	May 31, 1977 (aged 27)			(United States) Long Island Ducks
P	14	Thomas Whitty	September 6, 1981 (aged 22)			(United States) Durham Bulls
IF	16	Kevin Nicholson	March 29, 1976 (aged 28)			(United States) Altoona Curve
IF	17	Danny Klassen	September 22, 1975 (aged 28)			(United States) Toledo Mud Hens
OF	19	Adam Stern	February 12, 1980 (aged 24)			(United States) Greenville Braves
IF	20	Todd Betts	June 24, 1973 (aged 31)			(United States) Columbus Clippers
P	24	Shawn Hill	April 28, 1981 (aged 23)			(United States) Harrisburg Senators
P	25	Mike Johnson	October 3, 1975 (aged 28)			(Canada) Edmonton Trappers
OF	26	Jeremy Ware	October 23, 1975 (aged 28)			(United States) Harrisburg Senators
OF	27	Jeff Guiel	January 12, 1974 (aged 30)			(United States) Syracuse Sky Chiefs
C	28	Andy Stewart	December 5, 1970 (aged 33)			
P	29	Jason Dickson	March 30, 1973 (aged 31)			(United States) Omaha Royals
C	30	Pierre-Luc Laforest	January 27, 1978 (aged 26)			(United States) Durham Bulls
P	31	Aaron Myette	September 26, 1977 (aged 26)			(United States) Louisville Bats
P	32	Mike Kusiewicz	November 1, 1976 (aged 27)			(United States) Indianapolis Indians
IF	33	Simon Pond	October 27, 1976 (aged 27)			(United States) Syracuse Sky Chiefs
P	34	Chris Begg	July 8, 1974 (aged 30)			(United States) San Jose Giants
OF	35	Ryan Radmanovich	August 9, 1971 (aged 33)			(United States) Somerset Patriots
P	36	Paul Spoljaric	September 24, 1970 (aged 33)			
P	37	Éric Cyr	February 11, 1979 (aged 25)			(United States) Salt Lake Stingers
P	38	John Ogiltree	June 3, 1978 (aged 26)			(United States) New Hampshire Fisher Cats
P	40	Chris Mears	January 20, 1978 (aged 26)			(United States) Toledo Mud Hens

== Chinese Taipei ==
Manager: 85 – Hsu Sheng Ming (Chinatrust Whales).

Coaches: 29 – Lee Lai-Fa(National Training Team), 4 – Lin I-Tseng (Brother Elephants), 80 – Mitsujiro Sakai, 81 – Yang Shien-Ming (Fubon Bull).

Pos.	No.	Player	Date of birth (age)	Bats	Throws	Club
P	1	Wang Chien-Ming	March 31, 1981 (aged 23)			(United States) Trenton Thunder
IF	6	Tsai Feng-An	November 20, 1975 (aged 28)			(Taiwan) Brother Elephants
IF	13	Yung-Chi Chen	July 13, 1983 (aged 21)			(United States) Everett AquaSox
IF	17	Huang Chung-Yi	October 12, 1967 (aged 36)			(Taiwan) Sinon Bulls
P	18	Pan Wei-Lun	March 5, 1982 (aged 22)			(Taiwan) Uni-President Lions
P	19	Lin Ying-Chieh	May 1, 1981 (aged 23)			(Taiwan) Macoto Cobras
OF	23	Peng Cheng-Min	August 6, 1978 (aged 26)			(Taiwan) Brother Elephants
OF	24	Lin Wei-Chu	January 22, 1979 (aged 25)			(Japan) Hanshin Tigers
P	25	Tu Chang-Wei	May 11, 1982 (aged 22)			(Taiwan) Chinese Culture University
C	27	Yeh Chun-Chang	January 28, 1978 (aged 26)			(Taiwan) Sinon Bulls
IF	31	Cheng Chang-Ming	January 28, 1978 (aged 26)			(Taiwan) Chinatrust Whales
P	32	Huang Chun-Chung	April 25, 1982 (aged 22)			(United States) Boston Red Sox minor league restricted list
C	34	Kao Chih-kang	February 7, 1981 (aged 23)			Taiwan Cooperative Bank baseball team
P	46	Yang Chien-Fu	April 22, 1979 (aged 25)			(Taiwan) Sinon Bulls
IF	49	Chang Tai-Shan	October 31, 1976 (aged 27)			(Taiwan) Sinon Bulls
OF	50	Chen Chih-yuan	October 27, 1976 (aged 27)			(Taiwan) Brother Elephants
OF	52	Chen Chin-Feng	October 28, 1977 (aged 26)			(United States) Las Vegas 51s
P	54	Chen Wei-Yin	July 12, 1985 (aged 19)			(Japan) Chunichi Dragons
IF	55	Hsieh Chia-Shian	April 8, 1976 (aged 28)			(Taiwan) Macoto Cobras
P	56	Keng Po-Hsuan	October 15, 1984 (aged 19)			(Taiwan) Fubon Bull
P	71	Tsao Chin-Hui	June 2, 1981 (aged 23)			(United States) Colorado Springs Sky Sox
IF	88	Cheng Chao-Hang	February 14, 1977 (aged 27)			(Taiwan) Sinon Bulls
P	91	Lin En-Yu	March 25, 1981 (aged 23)			(Taiwan) National Training Team
P	99	Chang Chih-Chia	May 6, 1980 (aged 24)			(Japan) Seibu Lions

== Cuba ==
Manager: 39 – Higinio Vélez

Coach: 22 – Carlos Pérez Cepero, 30 – Pedro José Delgado Pérez, 34 – José Sánchez Elosegui, 41 – Francisco Laza Escaurrido Chapelle

Pos.	No.	Player	Date of birth (age)	Bats	Throws	Club
IF	2	Eduardo Paret	October 23, 1972 (aged 31)			(Cuba) Centrales
C	8	Ariel Pestano	January 31, 1974 (aged 30)			(Cuba) Centrales
IF	10	Yulieski Gourriel	June 9, 1984 (aged 20)			(Cuba) Centrales
IF	12	Michel Enríquez	February 11, 1979 (aged 25)			(Cuba) Occidentales
OF	14	Yoandri Urgelles	July 28, 1981 (aged 23)			(Cuba) Industriales
P	15	Danny Betancourt	May 25, 1981 (aged 23)			(Cuba) Orientales
P	16	Adiel Palma	August 20, 1970 (aged 33)			(Cuba) Centrales
P	20	Norge Luis Vera	August 3, 1971 (aged 33)			(Cuba) Orientales
OF	21	Alexei Ramírez	September 22, 1981 (aged 22)			(Cuba) Occidentales
P	23	Vicyohandri Odelín	February 26, 1980 (aged 24)			(Cuba) Orientales
OF	24	Frederich Cepeda	April 8, 1980 (aged 24)			(Cuba) Centrales
IF	25	Antonio Scull	September 10, 1985 (aged 18)			(Cuba) Industriales
P	26	Luis Borroto	August 24, 1982 (aged 21)			(Cuba) Centrales
P	28	Frank Montieth	January 11, 1985 (aged 19)			(Cuba) Industriales
IF	31	Yorelvis Charles	September 25, 1978 (aged 25)			(Cuba) Centrales
P	32	Norberto González	October 10, 1979 (aged 24)			(Cuba) Centrales
OF	46	Osmani Urrutia	June 28, 1979 (aged 25)			(Cuba) Orientales
IF	55	Eriel Sánchez	May 17, 1975 (aged 29)			(Cuba) Orientales
OF	56	Carlos Tabares	July 8, 1974 (aged 30)			(Cuba) Industriales
P	58	Jonder Martínez	June 22, 1978 (aged 26)			(Cuba) Occidentales
C	61	Roger Machado	March 31, 1974 (aged 30)			(Cuba) Occidentales
IF	74	Danny Miranda	November 12, 1978 (aged 25)			(Cuba) Occidentales
P	91	Manuel Vega	August 9, 1975 (aged 29)			(Cuba) Orientales
P	99	Pedro Luis Lazo	April 15, 1973 (aged 31)			(Cuba) Occidentales

== Greece ==
Manager: 27 – Jack Rhodes.

Coaches: 1 – Mike Riskas, 14 – Ioannis Kazanas, 42 – Scott Demtral.

Pos.	No.	Player	Date of birth (age)	Bats	Throws	Club
C	2	Dimitrios Douros	June 3, 1980 (aged 24)			(Greece) Marousi 2004
IF	3	Clay Bellinger	November 18, 1968 (aged 35)			(Canada) Ottawa Lynx
C	5	Mike Koutsantonakis	February 9, 1979 (aged 25)			(United States) Wichita Wranglers
C	6	George Kottaras	May 10, 1983 (aged 21)			(United States) Fort Wayne Wizards
OF	7	Cory Harris	December 7, 1979 (aged 24)			(United States) Delmarva Shorebirds
IF	8	Erik Pappas	April 25, 1966 (aged 38)			(United States) Oklahoma City 89ers
IF	10	Chris Demetral	December 8, 1969 (aged 34)			(United States) Oklahoma City 89ers (rtd)
P	13	Meleti Ross Melehes	January 7, 1977 (aged 27)			(Canada) London Werewolves (rtd)
IF	15	Peter Maestrales	July 4, 1979 (aged 25)			(United States) Newark Bears
P	17	Sean Spencer	May 29, 1975 (aged 29)			(United States) Bowie Baysox
OF	18	Bobby Kingsbury	August 30, 1980 (aged 23)			(United States) Hickory Crawdads
OF	21	Nick Markakis	November 17, 1983 (aged 20)			(United States) Delmarva Shorebirds
OF	23	Peter Rasmusen	October 30, 1980 (aged 23)			
P	24	Jared Theodorakos	March 15, 1981 (aged 23)			(United States) Helena Brewers
IF	26	Nicholas Theodorou	June 7, 1975 (aged 29)			(United States) Las Vegas 51s
OF	29	Jim Kavourias	October 4, 1979 (aged 24)			(United States) Jupiter Hammerheads
IF	31	Vasili Spanos	February 25, 1981 (aged 23)			(United States) Kane County Cougars
P	33	Laurence Heisler	February 13, 1969 (aged 35)			(United States) Spartanburg Phillies
P	34	Christoforos Robinson	August 18, 1972 (aged 31)			(Greece) Spartakos Glyfadas
OF	35	Scott Raymond	November 19, 1982 (aged 21)			(Canada) Barrie Baycats
P	37	Alex Cremidan	January 15, 1981 (aged 23)			(United States) South Bend Silver Hawks
P	39	Peter Soteropoulos	June 19, 1972 (aged 32)			(United States) Peoria Chiefs
P	41	Pete Sykaras	May 5, 1979 (aged 25)			(United States) El Paso Diablos
P	47	Clint Zavaras	January 4, 1967 (aged 37)			(Canada) Calgary Cannons

== Italy ==
Manager: 30 – Giampiero Faraone.

Coaches: 8 – Claudio Corradi, 12 – Manuel Cortina, 27 – Salvatore Varriale.

Pos.	No.	Player	Date of birth (age)	Bats	Throws	Club
IF	1	Igor Schiavetti	January 23, 1976 (aged 28)			(Italy) Danesi Nettuno
OF	2	David Francia	April 16, 1975 (aged 29)			(Italy) Prink Grosseto
OF	3	Jim Buccheri	November 12, 1968 (aged 35)			(Italy) AS Rimini
IF	5	Giovanni Pantaleoni	March 16, 1978 (aged 26)			(Italy) Italeri Bologna
C	6	Vincent Parisi	February 7, 1978 (aged 26)			(Italy) T&A San Marino
C	9	Luca Bischeri	June 12, 1979 (aged 25)			(Italy) La Gardenia Grosseto
IF	11	Seth La Fera	September 28, 1975 (aged 28)			(Italy) Telemarket Rimini
P	15	William Lucena	October 1, 1981 (aged 22)			(Italy) GB Ricandi Modena
P	16	Anthony Massimino	August 20, 1979 (aged 24)			(Italy) Cus Parma
OF	21	Daniele Frignani	June 29, 1977 (aged 27)			(Italy) Italieri Fortitudo Bologna
IF	22	Giuseppe Mazzanti	April 5, 1983 (aged 21)			(Italy) Danesi Nettuno
P	23	Carlo Richetti	August 23, 1983 (aged 20)			(Italy) Colavita Anzio
P	28	Fabio Milano	August 2, 1977 (aged 27)			(Italy) Fortitudo Bologna
P	29	Kasey Olemberger	March 18, 1978 (aged 26)			(Italy) Ceci E Negri Parma
OF	32	Francesco Casolari	October 4, 1965 (aged 38)			(Italy) La Gardenia Grosseto
IF	34	Davide Dallospedale	September 12, 1977 (aged 26)			(Italy) Italieri Fortitudo Bologna
P	36	Michael Marchesano	September 23, 1975 (aged 28)			(Italy) Telemarket Rimini
P	37	Peter Nyari	September 4, 1971 (aged 32)			(Italy) Cus Parma
P	40	David Rollandini	February 6, 1979 (aged 25)			(Italy) BBC ORIOLES
IF	41	Jairo Ramos Gizzi	July 21, 1971 (aged 33)			(Italy) La Gardenia Grosseto
IF	42	Claudio Liverziani	March 4, 1975 (aged 29)			(Italy) Italeri Fortitudo Bologna
P	43	Riccardo De Santis	January 4, 1980 (aged 24)			(Italy) La Gardenia Grosseto
OF	45	Mario Chiarini	January 7, 1981 (aged 23)			(Italy) Telemarket Rimini
C	72	Marcello Malagoli	July 14, 1973 (aged 31)			(Italy) GB Ricandi Modena

== Japan ==
Manager: 33 – Kiyoshi Nakahata.

Coaches: 31 – Yutaka Takagi, 32 – Yutaka Ohno.

Pos.	No.	Player	Date of birth (age)	Bats	Throws	Club
OF	1	Kosuke Fukudome	April 26, 1972 (aged 32)			(Japan) Chunichi Dragons
IF	2	Michihiro Ogasawara	October 25, 1973 (aged 30)			(Japan) Hokkaido Nippon Ham Fighters
IF	5	Norihiro Nakamura	July 24, 1973 (aged 31)			(Japan) Osaka Kintetsu Buffaloes
IF	6	Shinya Miyamoto	November 5, 1970 (aged 33)			(Japan) Yakult Swallows
IF	8	Makoto Kaneko	November 8, 1975 (aged 28)			(Japan) Hokkaido Nippon Ham Fighters
C	9	Kenji Johjima	June 8, 1976 (aged 28)			(Japan) Fukuoka Daiei Hawks
OF	10	Yoshitomo Tani	February 9, 1973 (aged 31)			(Japan) Orix BlueWave
P	11	Naoyuki Shimizu	November 24, 1975 (aged 28)			(Japan) Chiba Lotte Marines
P	13	Hitoki Iwase	November 8, 1974 (aged 29)			(Japan) Chunichi Dragons
P	15	Hiroki Kuroda	February 15, 1975 (aged 29)			(Japan) Hiroshima Toyo Carp
P	16	Yuya Ando	December 27, 1977 (aged 26)			(Japan) Hanshin Tigers
P	17	Daisuke Miura	December 25, 1973 (aged 30)			(Japan) Yokohama BayStars
P	18	Daisuke Matsuzaka	September 13, 1980 (aged 23)			(Japan) Seibu Lions
P	19	Koji Uehara	April 3, 1975 (aged 29)			(Japan) Yomiuri Giants
P	20	Hisashi Iwakuma	April 12, 1981 (aged 23)			(Japan) Osaka Kintetsu Buffaloes
P	21	Tsuyoshi Wada	February 21, 1981 (aged 23)			(Japan) Fukuoka Daiei Hawks
OF	23	Arihito Muramatsu	December 12, 1972 (aged 31)			(Japan) Orix BlueWave
OF	24	Yoshinobu Takahashi	April 3, 1975 (aged 29)			(Japan) Yomiuri Giants
IF	25	Atsushi Fujimoto	October 4, 1977 (aged 26)			(Japan) Hanshin Tigers
OF	27	Takuya Kimura	April 15, 1972 (aged 32)			(Japan) Hiroshima Toyo Carp
P	30	Masahide Kobayashi	May 24, 1974 (aged 30)			(Japan) Chiba Lotte Marines
OF	55	Kazuhiro Wada	June 19, 1972 (aged 32)			(Japan) Seibu Lions
C	59	Ryoji Aikawa	July 11, 1976 (aged 28)			(Japan) Yokohama BayStars
P	61	Hirotoshi Ishii	September 14, 1977 (aged 26)			(Japan) Yakult Swallows

== Netherlands ==
Manager: 6 – Robert Eenhoorn.

Coaches: 17 – Eric de Bruin, 30 – Davey Johnson, 32 – Hensley Meulens.

Pos.	No.	Player	Date of birth (age)	Bats	Throws	Club
IF	2	Yurendell de Caster	September 27, 1979 (aged 24)			(United States) Altoona Curve
P	3	Robin van Doornspeek	February 25, 1981 (aged 23)			(Netherlands) Minolta Pioniers
IF	4	Ivanon Coffie	May 16, 1977 (aged 27)			(United States) Houston Astros
P	5	Ferenc Jongejan	October 20, 1978 (aged 25)			(United States) Daytona Cubs
IF	7	Ralph Milliard	December 30, 1973 (aged 30)			(Netherlands) Mr Cocker HCAW
IF	9	Evert-Jan 't Hoen	November 8, 1975 (aged 28)			(Netherlands) DOOR Neptunus
IF	12	Sharnol Adriana	November 13, 1970 (aged 33)			(Mexico) Cafeteros de Córdoba
P	14	Dave Draijer	September 30, 1973 (aged 30)			(Netherlands) Mr Cocker HCAW
C	15	Maikel Benner	March 24, 1980 (aged 24)			(Netherlands) DOOR Neptunus
P	16	Patrick Beljaards	March 4, 1978 (aged 26)			(Netherlands) DPA Kinheim
OF	18	Dirk van 't Klooster	April 23, 1976 (aged 28)			(Netherlands) DOOR Neptunus
P	19	Rob Cordemans	October 31, 1974 (aged 29)			(Netherlands) DOOR Neptunus
P	20	Eelco Jansen	May 14, 1969 (aged 35)			(Netherlands) DOOR Neptunus
OF	21	Eugene Kingsale	August 20, 1976 (aged 27)			(United States) San Diego Padres
P	22	Patrick de Lange	January 21, 1976 (aged 28)			(Netherlands) Mr Cocker HCAW
OF	23	Johnny Balentina	August 8, 1971 (aged 33)			(Netherlands) DPA Kinheim
C	24	Sidney de Jong	April 14, 1979 (aged 25)			(Netherlands) Mr Cocker HCAW
OF	28	Harvey Monte	October 8, 1981 (aged 22)			(Netherlands) DOOR Neptunus
IF	30	Raily Legito	July 26, 1978 (aged 26)			(Netherlands) DOOR Neptunus
P	31	Alexander Smit	October 2, 1985 (aged 18)			(United States) Elizabethton Twins
C	33	Chairon Isenia	January 23, 1979 (aged 25)			(United States) Montgomery Biscuits
OF	34	Calvin Maduro	September 5, 1974 (aged 29)			(Netherlands) Mr Cocker HCAW
P	35	Diego Markwell	August 8, 1980 (aged 24)			(United States) New Haven Ravens
OF	37	Wladimir Balentien	July 2, 1984 (aged 20)			(United States) Seattle Mariners
