= 2003 European Olympic Baseball Qualifying Tournament =

Tournament details
- Country: Netherlands
- Venue(s): 3 (in 3 host cities)
- Dates: 23–26 July
- Teams: 6

The 2003 European Olympic Baseball Qualifying Tournament was held in the Netherlands from 23 to 27 July 2003. It was organized by the Confederation of European Baseball (CEB) and served as the European qualifier for the baseball tournament of the 2004 Summer Olympics in Athens. It awarded two berths, contested between the top six teams from the 2003 European Baseball Championship (except for Greece that had already qualified as hosts): Netherlands, Spain, Sweden, Italy, Czech Republic and France.

Italy and the Netherlands, the top two teams in the tournament, qualified for the Olympics.

== Participating teams ==
- Netherlands – 2003 European Baseball Championship winners
- Spain – 2003 European Baseball Championship third place
- Sweden – 2003 European Baseball Championship fourth place
- Italy – 2003 European Baseball Championship fifth place
- Czech Republic – 2003 European Baseball Championship sixth place
- France – 2003 European Baseball Championship seventh place

=== Rosters ===
Netherlands

Netherlands roster – 2003 European Olympic Baseball Qualifying Tournament
Players		Coaches
Pitchers: 16 Patrick Beljaards; 25 David Bergman; 19 Rob Cordemans; 22 Patrick de Lange; 3 Robin van Doornspeek; 14 Dave Draijer; 20 Eelco Jansen; 29 Roger Kops; 21 Alexander Smit	Catchers: 15 Maikel Benner; 24 Sidney de Jong; 33 Chairon Isenia; Infielders: 11 Yurendell DeCaster; 9 Evert-Jan 't Hoen; 26 Percy Isenia; 30 Raily Legito; 2 Vince Rooi; 5 Jeroen Sluijter; Outfielders: 12 Sharnol Adriana; 7 Bryan Engelhardt; 34 Stijn Gabriels; 18 Dirk van 't Klooster; 28 Harvey Monte; 8 Danny Rombley	Manager: 35 Davey Johnson; Coaches: 17 Eric de Bruin (coach); 10 Steve Janssen (coach); 32 Hensley Meulens (coach); 44 Ben Thyssen (coach); Roster

Spain

Spain roster – 2003 European Olympic Baseball Qualifying Tournament
Players		Coaches
Pitchers: 12 Raúl Arrondo; 20 Pedro Belmonte; 24 Sandel Cuevas; 28 Xavier Civit; 29 Fernando Gutiérrez; 3 Alberto Magallón; 15 Manuel Olivera; 5 René Reyes; 23 Carlos Ros; 2 José Taveras; 16 Jorge Vallès	Catchers: 21 Miguel Mora; 22 Juan Rodríguez; Infielders: 14 Miguel Erroz; 6 Jacobo Garrido; 13 Asnel Llanes; 10 Jorge Miqueleiz; 4 Néstor Pérez; 1 Javier Zabalza; Outfielders: 17 José Arrondo; 19 Juan García; 8 Félix Isasi; 9 Sebastián Tesouro; 7 David Zabalza	Manager: 30 Ramiro Toruño; Coaches: 22 Jorge Alcauzar (coach); 25 Juan Damborenea (coach); 26 Juan García (coach); Roster

Sweden

Sweden roster – 2003 European Olympic Baseball Qualifying Tournament
Players		Coaches
Pitchers: 18 Magnus Höglund; 49 Matt Jones; 72 Karl Knutsson; 43 David Leander; 29 Rickard Leander; 35 Rickard Ljung; 45 Richard Reimer; 62 Johan Tisell; 30 Petter Vesterlund	Catchers: 34 Mikael Andersson; 51 Peter Elfving; 52 Björn Johannesen; 48 Magnus Pilegård; Infielders: 42 Petter Diurlin; 33 Magnus Jönsson; 47 Doug Skiles; 27 Elias Sölveling; Outfielders: 53 Håkan Börjes; 60 Philip Gaijzler; 46 Per Lindgren	Manager: 44 Peter Schöön; Coaches: 61 Peter Ekwall (coach); 71 Jim Sasko (coach); 50 Leon Shades (coach); Roster

Italy

Italy roster – 2003 European Olympic Baseball Qualifying Tournament
Players		Coaches
Pitchers: 7 Ilo Bartolucci; 6 Antonio Bova; 25 Silvio Censale; 43 Riccardo De Santis; 15 William Lucena; 41 Luca Martignoni; 36 Fabio Milano; 40 Matteo Nava; 16 Peter Nyari; 29 Kasey Olenberger	Catchers: 12 Marcello Malagoli; 44 Vincent Parisi; Infielders: 9 Luca Bischeri; 34 Davide Dallospedale; 19 Francesco Imperiali; 11 Seth La Fera; 5 Giovanni Pantaleoni; 23 Jairo Ramos Gizzi; 1 Igor Schiavetti; 2 Andrea Sgnaolin; Outfielders: 45 Mario Chiarini; 3 Robert Fontana; 21 Daniele Frignani; 42 Claudio Liverziani	Manager: 30 Giampiero Faraone; Coaches: 8 Claudio Corradi (coach); 12 José Manuel Cortina (coach); 4 Sergio Morville (coach); 32 Antonio Muñoz (coach); 27 Salvatore Varriale (coach); Roster

Czech Republic

Czech Republic roster – 2003 European Olympic Baseball Qualifying Tournament
Players		Coaches
Pitchers: 24 Pavel Budský; 31 Lukaš Cama; 32 Jan Drábek; 26 Aleš Kepyta; 27 Aleš Kocman; 43 Zdeněk Kocman; 36 Leoš Kubát; 14 Michal Kočí; 46 Petr Minařík; 23 Petr Pacas; 10 Radek Procházka; 37 Robert Rondný; 42 Jakub Vančura	Catchers: 29 Michal Breg; 25 Martin Střítecký; Infielders: 20 Petr Baroch; 28 Jan Chudoba; 7 Michal Müller; 14 Tomáš Ovesný; 5 Pavel Procházka; 17 David Winkler; Outfielders: 15 Karel Hrušovský; 40 Ivo Kučera; 22 Tomáš Přibyl; 39 Martin Veselý	Manager: 3 Rick Jaques; Coaches: 18 Glen Godwin (coach); 19 Jaroslav Krejčíř (coach); 1 Aleš Navrátil (coach); 12 Thomas Randolph (coach); Roster

France

France roster – 2003 European Olympic Baseball Qualifying Tournament
Players		Coaches
Pitchers: 17 Patrice Briones; 12 Simon Colboc; 19 Nicolas Dubaut; 7 Guillaume Gisbert; 1 Thomas Langloys; 30 Maxime Leblanc; 4 Rémy Lejeune; 10 Samuel Meurant; 6 Anthony Piquet; 23 Boris Rothermundt; 18 Robin Roy	Catchers: 26 Jamel Boutagra; 11 Jérôme Dussart; 16 Pierrick Lemestre; 13 Boris Marche; Infielders: 9 Vincent Ferreira; 14 Christophe Goniot; 2 Sébastien Hervé; 20 Jean-Baptiste Meunier; 21 David Meurant; Outfielders: 24 Gaspard Fessy; 8 Fermin Neme; 27 Fabien Proust; 25 Jérôme Rousseau	Manager: Guillaume Coste; Coaches: Bill Arce (coach); Brad Doss (coach); Stéphane Dumont (coach); Andy Sallee (coach); Pierre Vieillot (coach); Roster

== Round robin ==
Pos	Team	Pld	W	L	RF	RA	RD	PCT	GB	Qualification
1	Italy	5	5	0	37	5	+32	1.000	—	Qualification to the 2004 Summer Olympics
2	Netherlands (H)	5	4	1	40	16	+24	.800	1	Qualification to the 2004 Summer Olympics
3	Czech Republic	5	3	2	30	24	+6	.600	2	
4	Spain	5	2	3	35	50	−15	.400	3	
5	France	5	1	4	28	39	−11	.200	4	
6	Sweden	5	0	5	16	52	−36	.000	5	

Source: European Baseball Confederation
(H) Hosts

23 July 2003; 13:00 (UTC+2)	Sweden	2 – 11	France	Neptunus Familiestadion, Rotterdam
23 July 2003; 13:00 (UTC+2)		Boxscore		Neptunus Familiestadion, Rotterdam

23 July 2003; 13:00 (UTC+2)	Italy	2 – 0	Spain	Pim Mulier Stadion, Haarlem
23 July 2003; 13:00 (UTC+2)		Boxscore		Pim Mulier Stadion, Haarlem

23 July 2003; 19:00 (UTC+2)	Czech Republic	4 – 6	Netherlands	Neptunus Familiestadion, Rotterdam
23 July 2003; 19:00 (UTC+2)		Boxscore		Neptunus Familiestadion, Rotterdam

24 July 2003; 13:00 (UTC+2)	Spain	3 – 8	Czech Republic	Pim Mulier Stadion, Haarlem
24 July 2003; 13:00 (UTC+2)		Boxscore		Pim Mulier Stadion, Haarlem

24 July 2003; 13:00 (UTC+2)	France	0 – 10 (F/7)	Italy	Neptunus Familiestadion, Rotterdam
24 July 2003; 13:00 (UTC+2)		Boxscore		Neptunus Familiestadion, Rotterdam

24 July 2003; 19:00 (UTC+2)	Netherlands	11 – 2	Sweden	Neptunus Familiestadion, Rotterdam
24 July 2003; 19:00 (UTC+2)		Boxscore		Neptunus Familiestadion, Rotterdam

25 July 2003; 13:00 (UTC+2)	Sweden	2 – 10	Czech Republic	Pim Mulier Stadion, Haarlem
25 July 2003; 13:00 (UTC+2)		Boxscore		Pim Mulier Stadion, Haarlem

25 July 2003; 13:00 (UTC+2)	Spain	16 – 15	France	Neptunus Familiestadion, Rotterdam
25 July 2003; 13:00 (UTC+2)		Boxscore		Neptunus Familiestadion, Rotterdam

25 July 2003; 20:30 (UTC+2)	Netherlands	3 – 4	Italy	Pim Mulier Stadion, Haarlem
25 July 2003; 20:30 (UTC+2)		Boxscore		Pim Mulier Stadion, Haarlem

26 July 2003; 13:00 (UTC+2)	Sweden	1 – 10	Italy	Neptunus Familiestadion, Rotterdam
26 July 2003; 13:00 (UTC+2)		Boxscore		Neptunus Familiestadion, Rotterdam

26 July 2003; 13:00 (UTC+2)	Netherlands	16 – 6 (F/7)	Spain	Pim Mulier Stadion, Haarlem
26 July 2003; 13:00 (UTC+2)		Boxscore		Pim Mulier Stadion, Haarlem

26 July 2003; 19:00 (UTC+2)	Czech Republic	7 – 2	France	Pim Mulier Stadion, Haarlem
26 July 2003; 19:00 (UTC+2)		Boxscore		Pim Mulier Stadion, Haarlem

27 July 2003; 12:30 (UTC+2)	France	0 – 4	Netherlands	Pim Mulier Stadion, Haarlem
27 July 2003; 12:30 (UTC+2)		Boxscore		Pim Mulier Stadion, Haarlem

27 July 2003; 13:00 (UTC+2)	Spain	10 – 9 (F/16)	Sweden	Neptunus Familiestadion, Rotterdam
27 July 2003; 13:00 (UTC+2)		Boxscore		Neptunus Familiestadion, Rotterdam

27 July 2003; 16:30 (UTC+2)	Italy	11 – 1 (F/7)	Czech Republic	Pim Mulier Stadion, Haarlem
27 July 2003; 16:30 (UTC+2)		Boxscore		Pim Mulier Stadion, Haarlem
