= David Bergman (baseball) =

Dutch baseball player (born 1981)

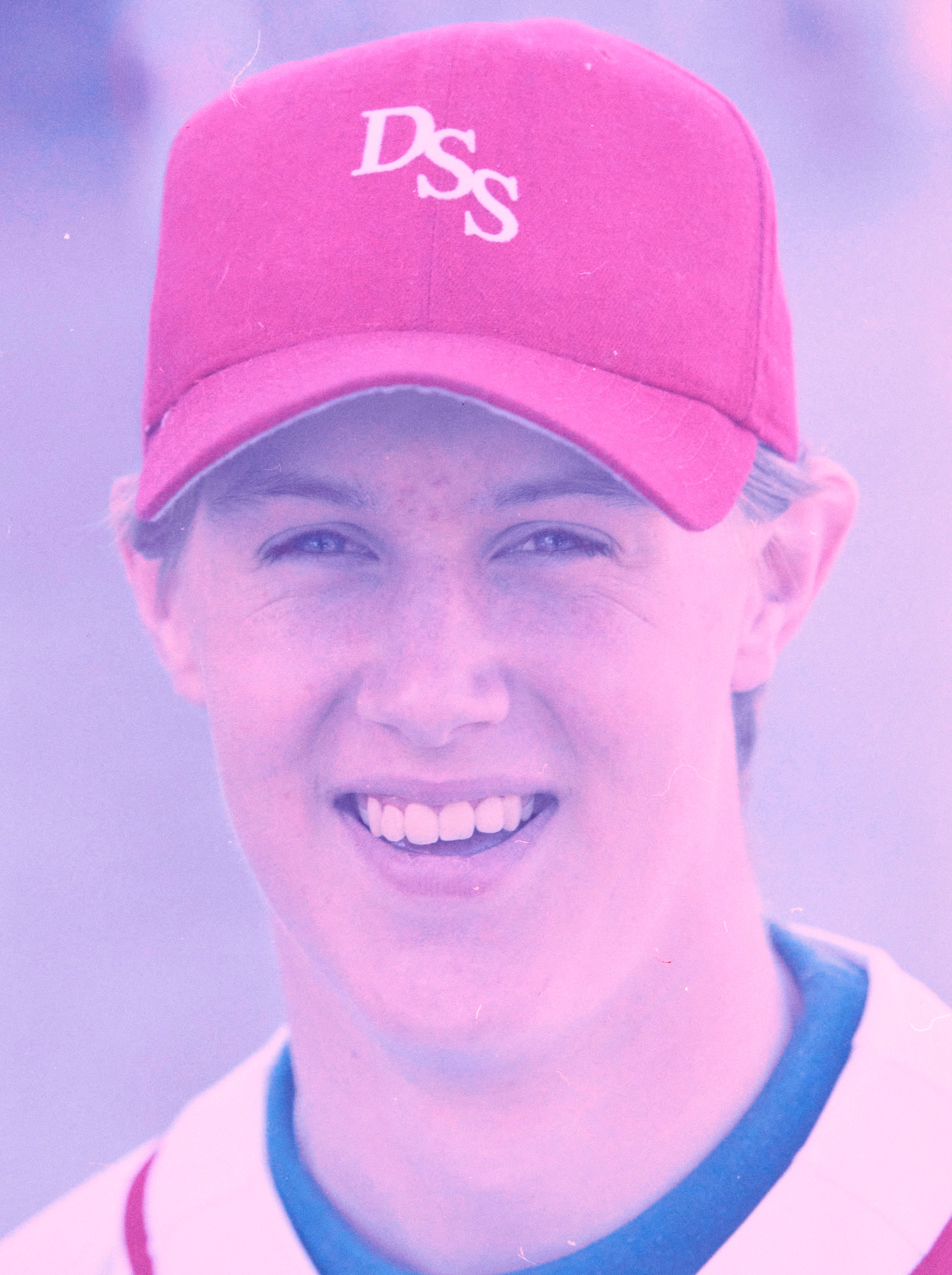
- Bergman in 1998
- Pitcher
- Born: 16 August 1981 (age 45); Haarlem, Netherlands
- Bats: Right Throws: Right
- Stats at Baseball Reference
Medals
Men's baseball
Representing Netherlands
Baseball World Cup
Gold medal – first place	2011 Panama City	National team
Intercontinental Cup
Silver medal – second place	2010 Taichung	National team
European Baseball Championship
Gold medal – first place	2003 Netherlands	National team
Gold medal – first place	2007 Montjuïc	National team
Silver medal – second place	2010 Stuttgart	National team
Gold medal – first place	2014 Brno	National team
France International Baseball Tournament
Gold medal – first place	2014 Sénart	National team

David Franciscus Johan Bergman (born 16 August 1981) is a Dutch former professional baseball player. He pitched for the Netherlands national team in the 2008 Summer Olympics, 2006, 2009, and 2013 World Baseball Classics, and other tournaments. He also played in the Honkbal Hoofdklasse, the top Dutch league, for Pioniers and Kinheim.

== Career ==
Bergman started his career at Haarlem Nicols and later at DSS. He was first selected for the Netherlands youth team in 1997, playing for the team for three years and winning three consecutive European youth championships. In 1999, he won the Roel de Mon Award, a trophy for the best junior pitcher in the country. A year later, he won the 2000 Triple Crown Tournament in Belgium with the Dutch national B-team.

Bergman was first selected for the Dutch national team in 2003. There, he joined fellow Pioniers pitchers Robin van Doornspeek and Roger Kops. That year, Bergman took part in the World Port Tournament, European Baseball Championships, and 2004 Olympics qualification tournament. With Pioniers, he won the 2003 European Cup Winners' Cup and the 2004 European Super Cup.

Bergman did not make the 2004 Olympics team, but he rejoined the national squad for the 2005 European championships in the Czech Republic, where they won the title. After the European title, Bergman and the Dutch team finished fourth in the 2005 World Cup, held in the Netherlands. Bergman won one of his two games and finished with a 1.00 earned run average.

Bergman was part of the Dutch squad for the 2006 World Baseball Classic (WBC) in Puerto Rico. He pitched 1 1/3 innings in a loss to host Puerto Rico, allowing one run and four hits. Later that year, he took part in the Dutch squad that played at the European Baseball Series, Haarlem Baseball Week, and Intercontintental Cup, where the Netherlands finished second.

2006 was also one of Bergman's best years in the Dutch league. In his first season with Kinheim, he went 12–2. Kinheim were regular season champions and defeated Pioniers in the Holland Series.

Bergman pitched 7 shutout innings in the 2007 European championship to qualify the Dutch for the 2008 Olympics. At the Olympics, he earned a save in a win over China but was 0–1 with a 13.52 ERA.

Bergman took part in the 2009 WBC. He allowed three runs in five innings of relief over three games. Bergman was on the 2011 World Cup-champion team, which received the knighthood in the order of Orange-Nassau.

In 2012, Kinheim finished fourth in the Hoofdklasse regular season yet made it to the Holland Series where they won the national title by defeating Neptunus in a 4–0 sweep. Bergman got 13 strikeouts in 8 innings in the decisive Game 4 and was named the series MVP.

Bergman pitched in the 2013 WBC. He took the loss in a seeding game against Japan after allowing 7 runs in 1 2/3 inning. That July, he earned his 100th win in the Hoofdklasse, the 12th pitcher to reach that milestone.

Bergman retired from the national team in October 2014. He continued to pitch in the Dutch league through 2016.

Kinheim retired Bergman's uniform number 47.
