= Malagoli =

Malagoli is an Italian surname. Notable people with the surname include:

- Giovanni Malagoli (1856–1926), Italian painter
- Marcello Malagoli (born 1973), Italian baseball player
