= 2024 Japan Series =

Nippon Professional Baseball's championship series

Team (Wins)	Managers	Season
Yokohama DeNA BayStars (4)	Daisuke Miura	71–69–3 (.507), 8 GB
Fukuoka SoftBank Hawks (2)	Hiroki Kokubo	91–49–3 (.650), 13½ GA
- Dates: October 26 – November 3, 2024
- Venue(s): Yokohama Stadium (DeNA); Mizuho PayPay Dome (SoftBank)
- MVP: Masayuki Kuwahara (DeNA)
- FSA: Kenta Imamiya (SoftBank)
- Umpires: Hideto Fuke, Shinichiro Hara, Masaharu Kasahara Katsumi Manabe, Kazuaki Nako, Naoto Shikita, Tetsuo Yamaji

Broadcast
- Television: TBS, NHK-BS, Fuji TV, TV Asahi, TVer, U-Next, Abema
- TV announcers: Koji Akiyama, Norichika Aoki, Keisuke Hatsuta, Kimiyasu Kudo, Hiromi Makihara, Masatoshi Namba, Etsuo Nitta, Hirotoshi Sakanashi, Kazuhiro Sasaki, Tomoya Satozaki, Toshiya Sugiuchi, Daiki Tanaka, Seiichi Uchikawa

The 2024 Japan Series (日本シリーズ, Nippon Shiriizu) was the championship series of Nippon Professional Baseball (NPB) for the 2024 season. The 75th edition of the Japan Series, it was a best-of-seven playoff between the Yokohama DeNA BayStars of the Central League (CL) and the Fukuoka SoftBank Hawks of the Pacific League (PL). The series began on October 26 and ended on November 3 with the BayStars winning in six games. It was the BayStars' first Japan Series appearance and win since 2017 and 1998 respectively, and the Hawks' first Japan Series appearance since 2020.

The Hawks were the best team in NPB all season and won the PL title, which advanced them directly to the final stage of the PL Climax Series where they swept the Hokkaido Nippon-Ham Fighters to advance to the Japan Series. The BayStars finished the regular season third in the CL, allowing them to face off against the Hanshin Tigers in the first stage of the CL Climax Series. After sweeping the Tigers in two games, DeNA took the CL-winning Yomiuri Giants to an ultimate Game 6 in the final stage and won to clinch their Japan Series berth.

SoftBank won the first two games of the series and extended their record consecutive Japan Series win streak to fourteen games. DeNA broke the streak, however, and won the next four games. In that stretch, they kept the Hawks scoreless for 29 consecutive innings, a Japan Series record. DeNA's win has been called one of the biggest upsets in Japan Series history. The championship was their first in 26 years and their third overall. Masayuki Kuwahara was named the Japan Series Most Valuable Player.

== Background ==
The Fukuoka SoftBank Hawks clinched their first Pacific League (PL) championship in four years and 20th overall on September 23. Hiroki Kokubo led the Hawks to the pennant in his first year as the team's manager. SoftBank led the league for the majority of the season, never relinquishing first place after taking the top spot on April 4th. SoftBank won their final game of the season, allowing Kokubo to break the record for most wins in single regular season by a first-year manager. The 91-win season was only the thirteenth time a team won 90 or more games in Nippon Professional Baseball (NPB) history and the first since they won 94 games in 2017. Several Hawks players earned end-of-season PL superlatives. On offense, Hotaka Yamakawa finished the season with 34 home runs and 99 runs batted in, the most by a wide margin. Kensuke Kondo's .314 batting average earned him the PL batting title and the PL MVP award, and Ukyo Shuto stole the most bases. Among pitchers, Liván Moinelo had the best earned run average (ERA) among PL starting pitchers with a 1.88 ERA in his first season as a starter and Kohei Arihara ended the season tied for the most wins, with 14.

As winners of the Pacific League, SoftBank advanced directly to the final stage of the PL Climax Series where they hosted the Hokkaido Nippon-Ham Fighters, the PL runner-up and eventual winner of the first stage. SoftBank began the best-of-six series with a one-win advantage and swept the next three games against Nippon-Ham to advance to the Japan Series.

In the Central League (CL), the Hiroshima Toyo Carp were narrowly in first place at the end of August. They had a disastrous September, however, losing 20 of 25 games, and quickly dropped in the rankings. As the season came to a close, Hiroshima continued to lose. A fourth Carp loss in a row on October 2 confirmed that the Yokohama DeNA BayStars would clinch third place and their third straight trip to the Climax Series. First-year team captain Shugo Maki and eventual 2024 batting champion Tyler Austin powered the DeNA offense, while ace Katsuki Azuma led the pitching staff with thirteen wins. From the start of the season, Azuma won eight straight games, helping the BayStars reach second place by the end of June. A month later, however, the team was in the midst of a nine-game losing streak and found themselves knocked down to fourth. Still in fourth and outside of Climax Series qualification on August 27, Maki introduced the motto "determined to win" to the team. The BayStars immediately went on a five-game win streak and finished the next month with a September record of 11–9–1. This push along with Hiroshima's fall secured DeNA a playoff appearance. They finished the season eight games behind the pennant-winning Yomiuri Giants.

As third-place finishers, the BayStars were the road team for all games played in the CL Climax Series. In the first stage, a best-of-three series, they defeated the second-place Hanshin Tigers in two games at Koshien Stadium. The sweep advanced DeNA to the final stage, where they faced off against the CL-champion Yomiuri Giants at the Tokyo Dome. The BayStars won the first three games of the series, giving them five straight Climax Series wins. The Giants won the second two games, however, with the one game advantage afforded to the league winner, the series was tied at three games a piece going into the final Game 6. DeNA won the game and series with a come-from-behind win and clinched their first Japan Series berth since 2017.

First stage
Central League
2	Hanshin Tigers	0
3	Yokohama DeNA BayStars	2
Pacific League
2	Hokkaido Nippon-Ham Fighters	2
3	Chiba Lotte Marines	1

Final stage
1	Yomiuri Giants	3
3	Yokohama DeNA BayStars	4
1	Fukuoka SoftBank Hawks	4
2	Hokkaido Nippon-Ham Fighters	0

Japan Series
CL3	Yokohama DeNA BayStars	4
PL1	Fukuoka SoftBank Hawks	2

== Series notes ==
2024 Japan Series managers

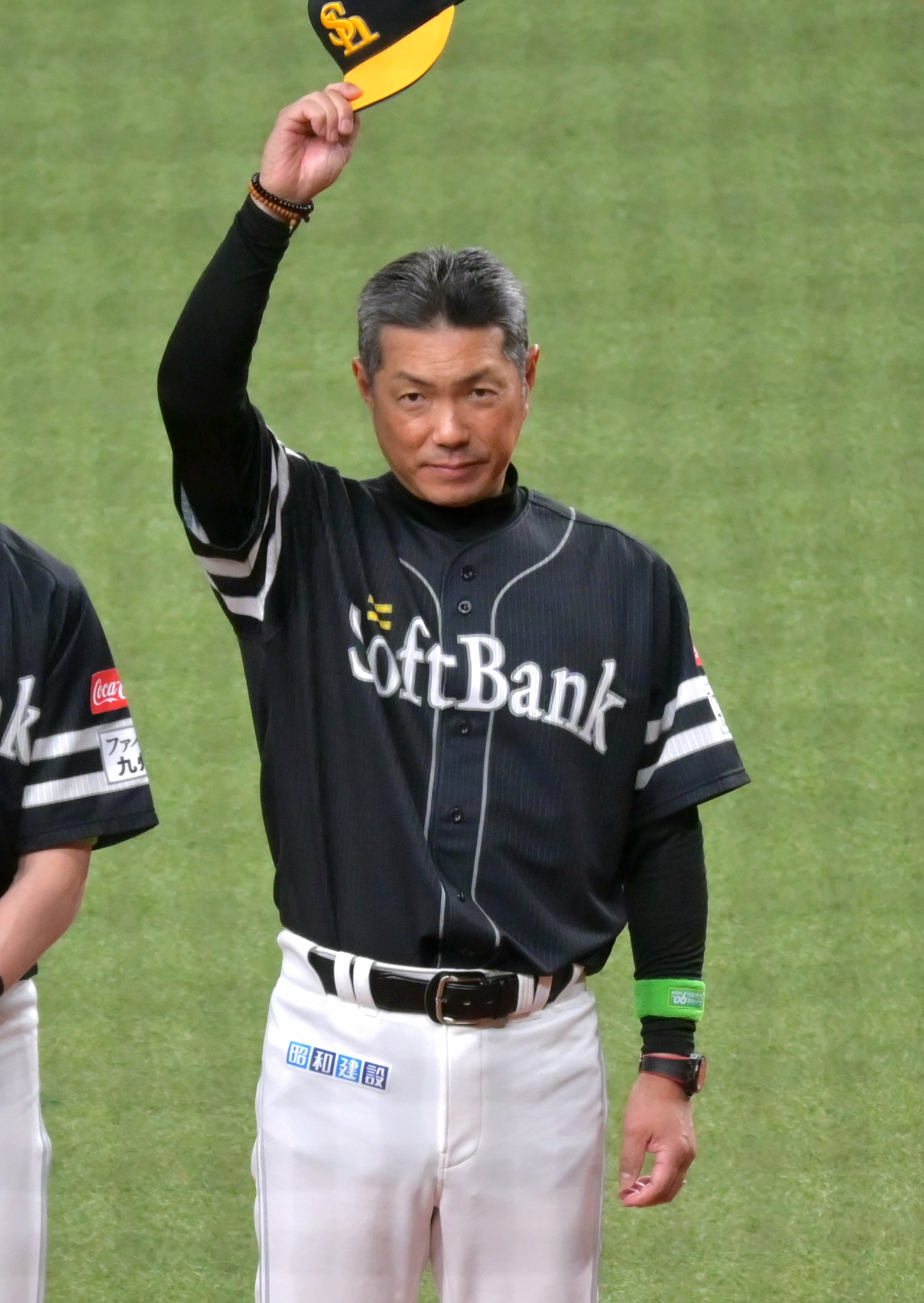
Hiroki Kokubo, SoftBank

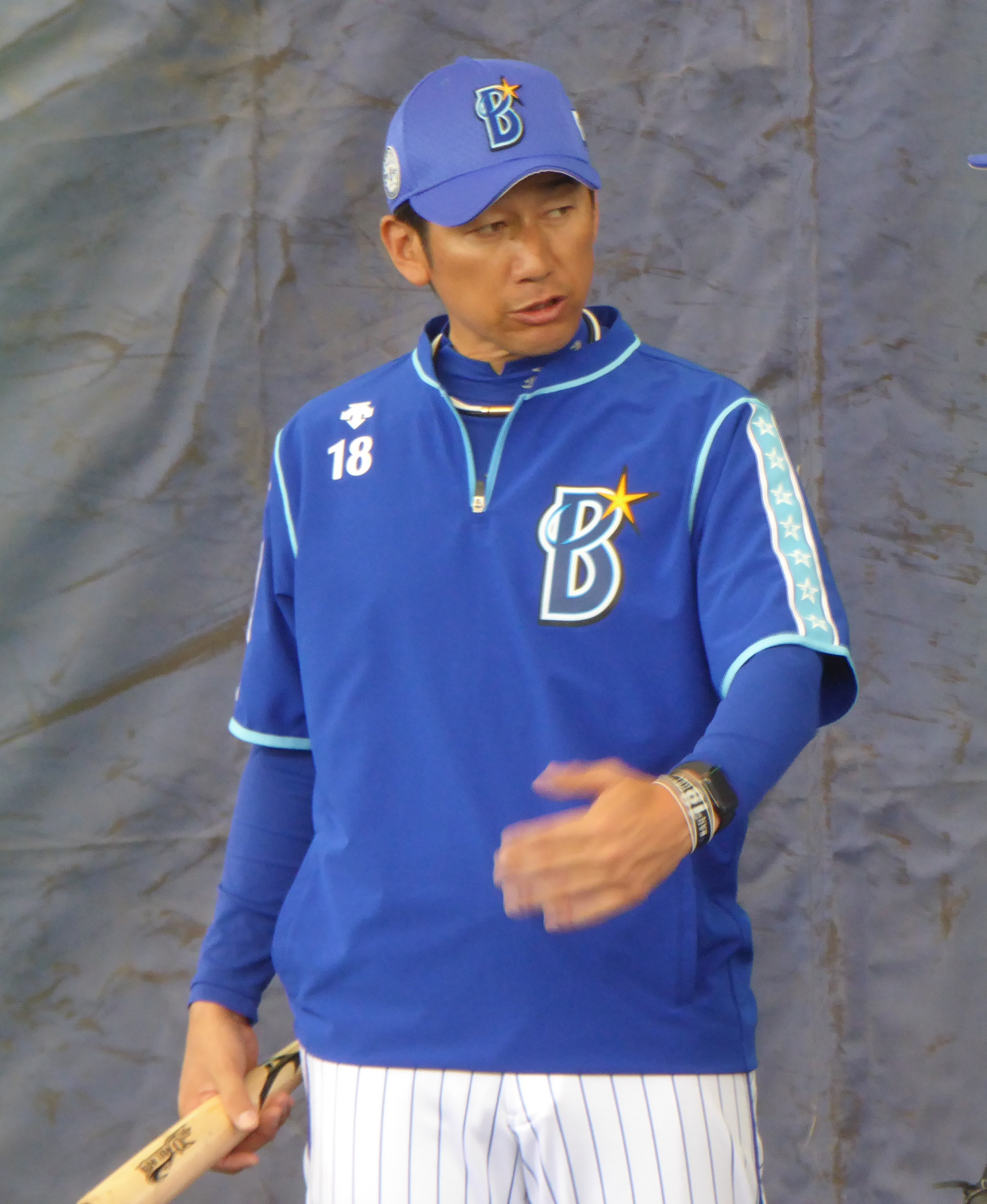
Daisuke Miura, DeNA

SoftBank is considered to be a current NPB dynasty, winning seven of the ten Japan Series from 2011 to 2020. This series was their first Japan Series appearance since 2020, one they finished in a four-game sweep to earn their eleventh championship. Including the 2020 series, the Hawks won their last twelve straight Japan Series games coming into Game 1 of this season's championship series.

DeNA's last appearance in the Japan Series was seven years ago in the 2017 Japan Series, a series they lost to SoftBank that shared many parallels to the 2024 rematch. BayStars manager Daisuke Miura was a starting pitcher for the team the last time that they won the title 26 years ago in 1998, only their second championship. That season also marks the last time the BayStars won the league pennant, an NPB-record 28 years.

In their only regular season meeting during interleague play in June, SoftBank won the series 2–1. Both teams led their respective leagues in runs scored, but while the Hawks led the PL in pitching and defense, the BayStars led both leagues in errors and were fifth worst of the six teams in the CL in runs allowed. Along with the 2010 Japan Series champion Chiba Lotte Marines and the 2017 BayStars, DeNA is only the third team in NPB history to advance through the Climax Series as a third seed and only the ninth team to reach the Japan Series without the placing first in the regular season. They finished the regular season only two games above .500, for a final winning percentage of .507, the lowest of any Japan Series team. Conversely, the Hawks finished the season with a record of 91–49–3, 42 games above .500 and a .650 winning percentage. The difference between the two teams' winning percentages is the largest in Japan Series history.

Home field advantage for the Japan Series alternates between the Pacific and Central leagues every year. For this series, it was the CL's turn to hold the advantage, so home field was awarded to the BayStars. The designated hitter rule was only in effect for games three, four, and five played at Mizuho PayPay Dome, as the CL has not adopted the rule. Sumitomo Mitsui Banking Corporation (SMBC) sponsored the event for the eleventh consecutive year and held the naming rights for the series, with its full title being "SMBC Nippon Series 2024".

== Summary ==
DeNA won the series, 4–2.

Game	Date	Score	Location	Time	Attendance
1	October 26	Fukuoka SoftBank Hawks – 5, Yokohama DeNA BayStars – 3	Yokohama Stadium	3:46	33,147
2	October 27	Fukuoka SoftBank Hawks – 6, Yokohama DeNA BayStars – 3	Yokohama Stadium	3:20	32,953
3	October 29	Yokohama DeNA BayStars – 4, Fukuoka SoftBank Hawks – 1	Mizuho PayPay Dome Fukuoka	3:37	36,736
4	October 30	Yokohama DeNA BayStars – 5, Fukuoka SoftBank Hawks – 0	Mizuho PayPay Dome Fukuoka	3:19	36,623
5	October 31	Yokohama DeNA BayStars – 7, Fukuoka SoftBank Hawks – 0	Mizuho PayPay Dome Fukuoka	3:38	36,636
6	November 3 (Note: Game 6 was scheduled to be played on November 2, but was postponed due to rain.)	Fukuoka SoftBank Hawks – 2, Yokohama DeNA BayStars – 11	Yokohama Stadium	3:11	33,136

== Game summaries ==
=== Game 1 ===
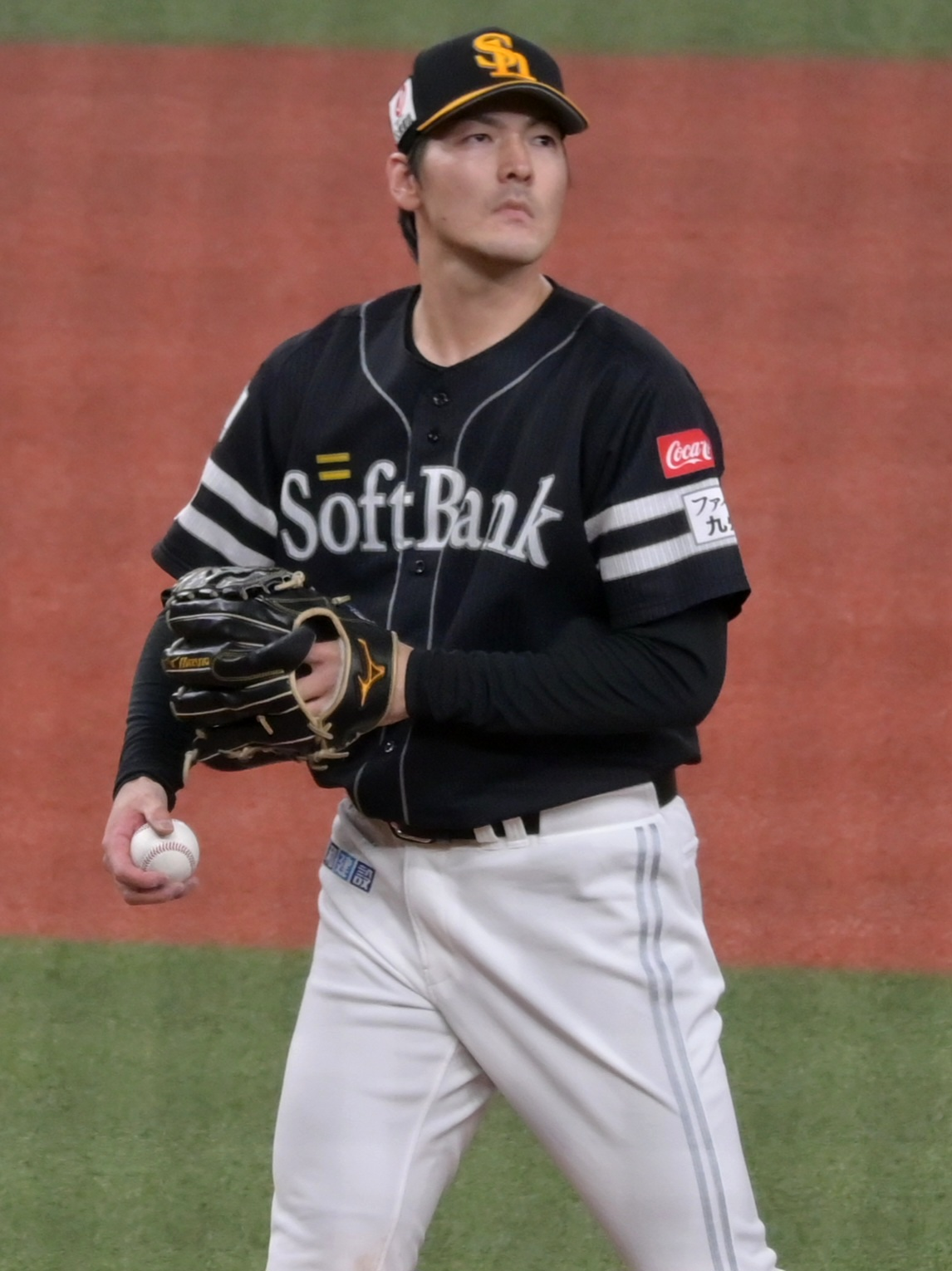
Kohei Arihara pitched seven scoreless innings and had two RBIs in Game 1.

Saturday, October 26, 2024, 6:33 pm (JST) at Yokohama Stadium in Yokohama, Kanagawa Prefecture
Team	1	2	3	4	5	6	7	8	9	R	H	E
SoftBank	0	2	0	0	0	0	0	0	3	5	9	1
DeNA	0	0	0	0	0	0	0	0	3	3	9	1
WP: Kohei Arihara (1–0) LP: Andre Jackson (0–1); Attendance: 33,147; Boxscore

Before the start of Game 1, Nobuteru Maeda of the band Tube sang the Japanese national anthem, and Hall of Famer Hiroshi Gondoh, the former BayStars manager that led the team to its last Japan Series championship in 1998, threw out the ceremonial first pitch. The BayStars' starting pitcher was Andre Jackson, while the Hawks used Arihara. The game was the first home contest in nine games for the BayStars dating back to the start of the CL Climax Series. Arihara pitched seven scoreless innings for the Hawks, allowing four hits and two walks while striking out four batters. Playing in a CL ballpark with the designated hitter rule not in effect also meant that Arihara would bat. In the second inning, Jackson issued a one-out walk followed by a Taisei Makihara double. With runners at second and third bases, DeNA opted to intentionally walk the next batter to load the bases and instead pitch to the inexperienced Arihara. The pitcher, however, hit a ground ball single to score the runner from third, and Makihara also scored when the player fielding the ball bobbled it, giving the Hawks a 2–0 lead. The two runs batted in (RBI) were the first of Arihara's professional career. Jackson's next strike to end the inning was the first of five straight strike outs, tying a Japan Series record. In his 4 2/3-inning start, Jackson struck out a total of nine batters, issued four walks and allowed two runs on three hits.

In the ninth inning, two SoftBank singles put runners at first and second bases and Kenta Imamiya hit a double to score both. A throwing error on the play allowed him to advance to third base. Ryoya Kurihara then hit a single to score Imamiya and extend the Hawks' lead to 5–0. These extra three runs would prove important when DeNA scored their first runs of the series in bottom of the inning. Tyler Austin lead the inning off with a double off of Hawks closer Roberto Osuna. Koki Kajiwara and Keito Mori then drove in two runs with consecutive hits to bring the BayStars within three. Later in the inning, a throwing error by Osuna allowed DeNA to score one more run. The next at bat, Shugo Maki flew out with the potential tying runs on base to end the game 5–3. The win extended the Hawks' record consecutive Japan Series win streak to thirteen games.

=== Game 2 ===
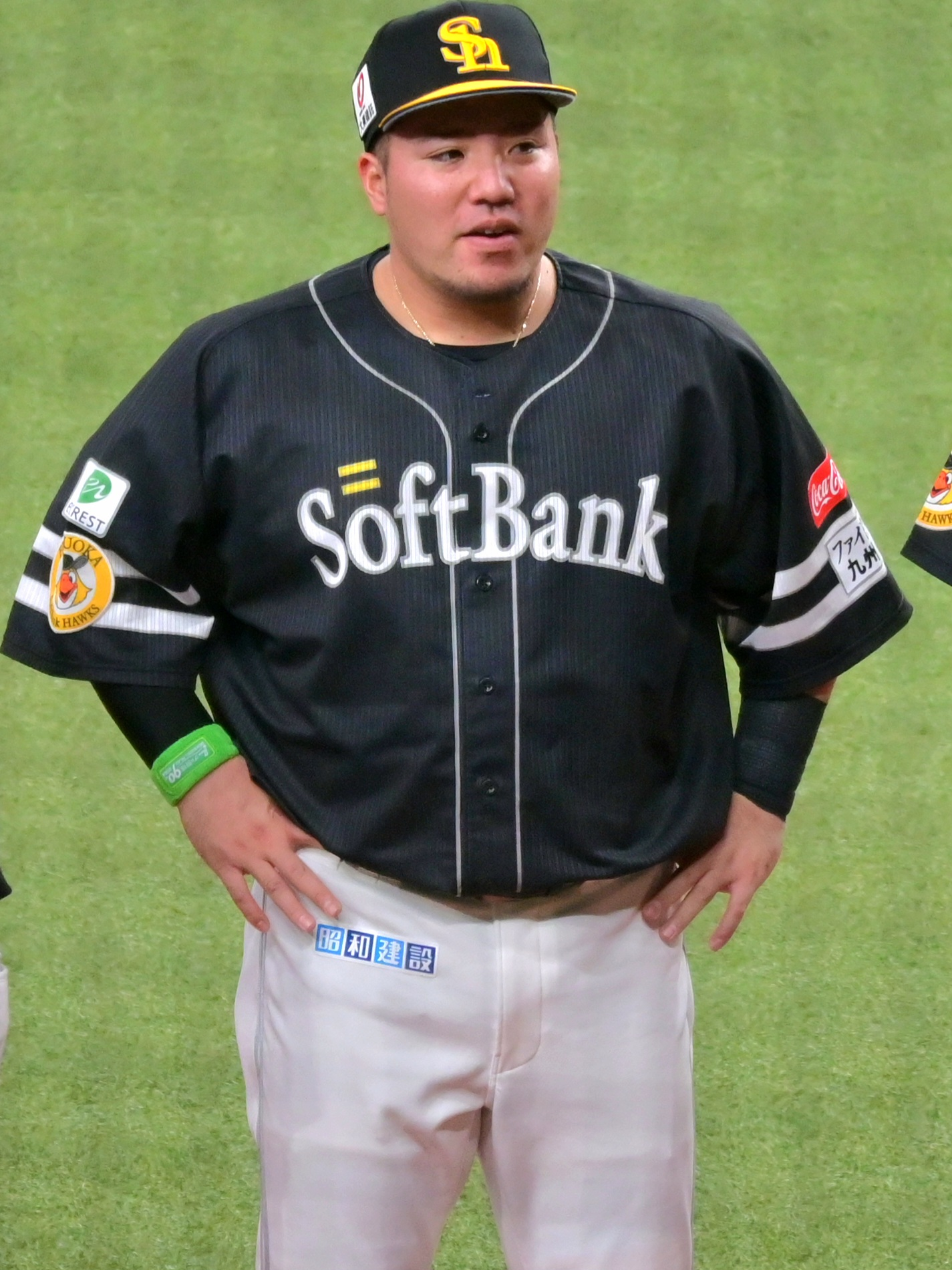
Hotaka Yamakawa had three hits, including a two-run home run, in Game 2.

Sunday, October 27, 2024, 6:03 pm (JST) at Yokohama Stadium in Yokohama, Kanagawa Prefecture
Team	1	2	3	4	5	6	7	8	9	R	H	E
SoftBank	2	0	3	1	0	0	0	0	0	6	9	0
DeNA	0	0	0	0	2	0	1	0	0	3	9	1
WP: Liván Moinelo (1–0) LP: Shinichi Ohnuki (0–1) Sv: Roberto Osuna (1); Home runs: SOF: Hotaka Yamakawa (1); DNA: None; Attendance: 32,953; Boxscore

Wheelchair tennis player Yui Kamiji threw out the ceremonial first pitch. Game 2 featured starting pitchers Liván Moinelo for SoftBank and Shinichi Ohnuki for DeNA. Austin, one of the BayStars' most important offensive players, did not play after being hit in the left foot by a ball in Game 1. In the top of the first inning, all three outs were swinging strikeouts by Ohnuki, however he gave up three hits, including a two-run home run by Hotaka Yamakawa to give the Hawks an early 2–0 lead. Ohnuki was replaced in the third inning after Makihara singled to drive in two more runs. Takuya Kai added one more run to their lead via a sacrifice fly before the end of the inning to extend their lead to 5–0. Ukyo Shuto then reached second on a double and scored on a Yamakawa RBI single the next inning to make it 6–0. After that, BayStars pitchers prevented all of the remaining 16 Hawks batters from reaching base.

Moinelo kept the BayStars scoreless until he started to struggle in the fifth inning. In the inning, DeNA was able to get two men on base starting with a batted ball that hit the Hawks pitcher. Masayuki Kuwahara then hit a double to score both runners. Moinelo continued to pitch into the seventh inning until he was removed from the game after giving up two consecutive singles that ultimately allowed Maki to drive in DeNA's third run via a double. Unlike the previous game, Hawks closer Osuna retired the last three BayStars' batters in the ninth inning to earn himself save and the Hawks the win, their 14th consecutive win in the Japan Series.

=== Game 3 ===
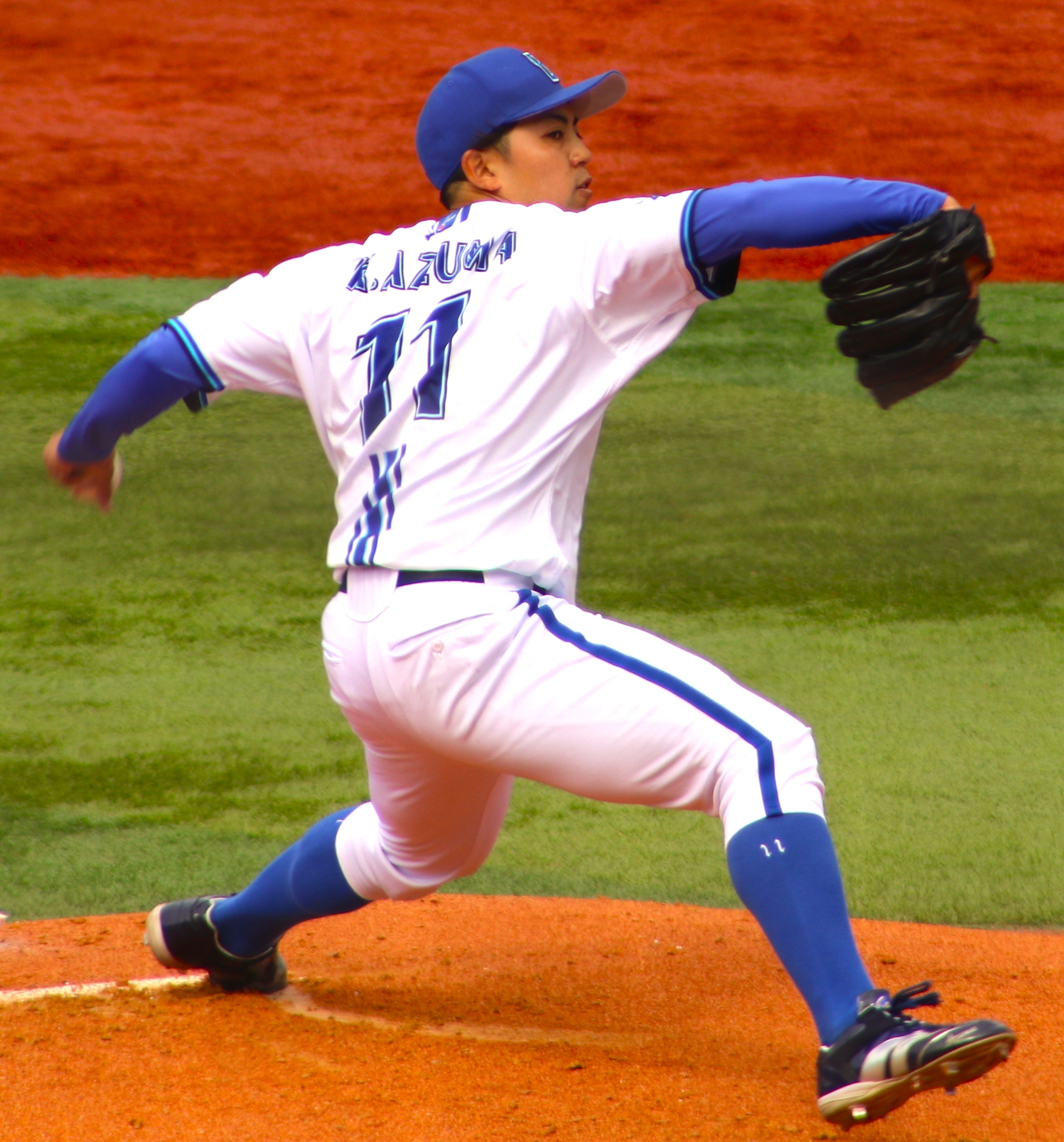
Pitcher Katsuki Azuma allowed only one run in seven innings to earn the Game 3 win.

Tuesday, October 29, 2024, 6:34 pm (JST) at Mizuho PayPay Dome in Fukuoka, Fukuoka Prefecture
Team	1	2	3	4	5	6	7	8	9	R	H	E
DeNA	1	0	0	0	2	0	0	1	0	4	6	0
SoftBank	1	0	0	0	0	0	0	0	0	1	10	0
WP: Katsuki Azuma (1–0) LP: Ryosuke Ohtsu (0–1) Sv: Kohei Morihara (1); Home runs: DNA: Masayuki Kuwahara (1); SOF: None; Attendance: 36,736; Boxscore

Game 3's national anthem was sung by Atagi of the musical trio Awesome City Club and the ceremonial first pitch was thrown out by Olympic gold medalist breakdancer Ami Yuasa. SoftBank started pitcher Carter Stewart Jr., while DeNA started Katsuki Azuma. It was the first game the BayStars' ace pitched in since hurting his hamstring running the bases during the first stage of the CL Climax Series. DeNA targeted Game 3, the first game played at a PL ballpark, for his return because the designated hitter rule meant Azuma would not bat or run the bases. Additionally, both teams' designated hitters returned to the lineups after missing games because of injuries. SoftBank's Kensuke Kondo, who had been sidelined with a sprained ankle, made his first appearance in the series, and DeNA's Austin returned after missing the previous game because of a bruised foot sustained in Game 1.

The BayStars opened the game with a leadoff double by Kuwahara in the first inning and, after a sacrifice bunt advanced him to third base, a ground out allowed him to score. The resulting 1–0 lead was DeNA's first of the series. In the bottom half of the inning, the Hawks tied the game with the help of sloppy defensive play from the BayStars. It would prove to be their only run of the game, however, as Azuma pitched seventh innings, allowing only one run on ten hits while striking out four and walking none. SoftBank relief pitcher Ryosuke Ohtsu came into the game in the fifth inning and immediately gave up a solo home run to Kuwahara. Following the home run, DeNA loaded the bases with no outs and Yoshitomo Tsutsugo hit a sacrifice fly to increase the lead to 3–1. Yasutaka Tobashira's double in the eighth inning brought the final score to 4–1, giving the BayStars their first win of the series and ending the Hawks' 14-game Japan Series winning streak.

=== Game 4 ===
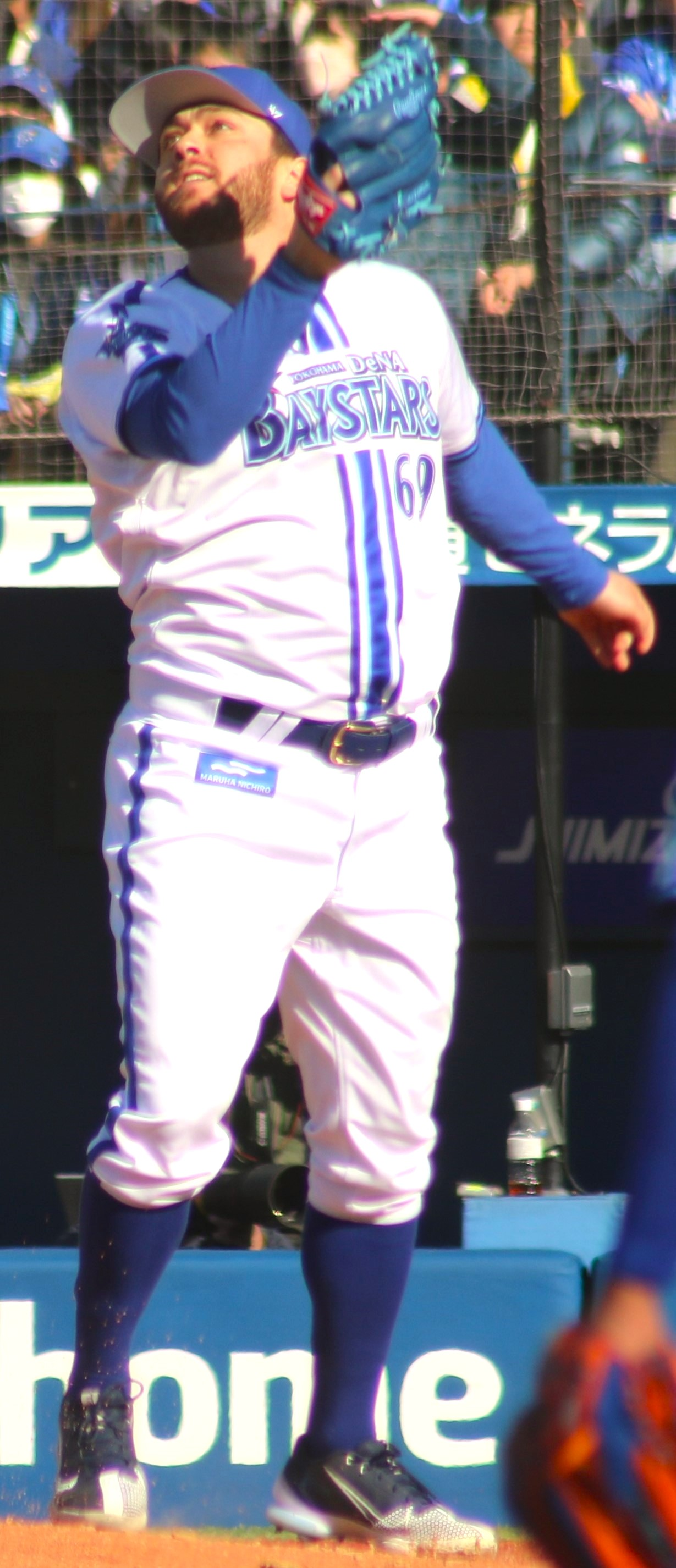
Anthony Kay pitched seven scoreless innings in his Game 3 win.

Wednesday, October 30, 2024, 6:33 pm (JST) at Mizuho PayPay Dome in Fukuoka, Fukuoka Prefecture
Team	1	2	3	4	5	6	7	8	9	R	H	E
DeNA	0	0	0	1	0	0	4	0	0	5	11	0
SoftBank	0	0	0	0	0	0	0	0	0	0	5	0
WP: Anthony Kay (1–0) LP: Shuta Ishikawa (0–1); Home runs: DNA: Tyler Austin (1), Toshiro Miyazaki (1); SOF: None; Attendance: 36,623; Boxscore

Actress and former Nogizaka46 member Mizuki Yamashita threw the ceremonial first pitch for Game 4. Anthony Kay was the starting pitcher for the BayStars and Shuta Ishikawa for the Hawks. Both teams were scoreless through three innings, with Kay retiring all of the first nine batters he faced, striking out six. In the fourth inning, Austin gave DeNA the lead with a solo home run off of Ishikawa. It would be the only run he would allow on four hits and no walks in his 5 2/3-inning start. Yoshiyasu Sasagawa led off the sixth inning with a single for the Hawks. Kay then issued a walk to put two men on base with PL home run leader Yamakawa up to bat, but he was able to get him to fly out to escape the inning without allowing any runs. Kay was removed from the game after pitching seven scoreless innings.

Toshiro Miyazaki hit the BayStars' second solo home run of the game to lead off the seven inning against the Hawks' bullpen. Later in the inning, Kuwahara hit a two-run double and Austin had an RBI single to extend the lead to 4–0. DeNA's relief pitchers prevented the SoftBank from scoring to complete the shutout win, their eighth road win of the postseason, evening the series at two games a piece.

=== Game 5 ===
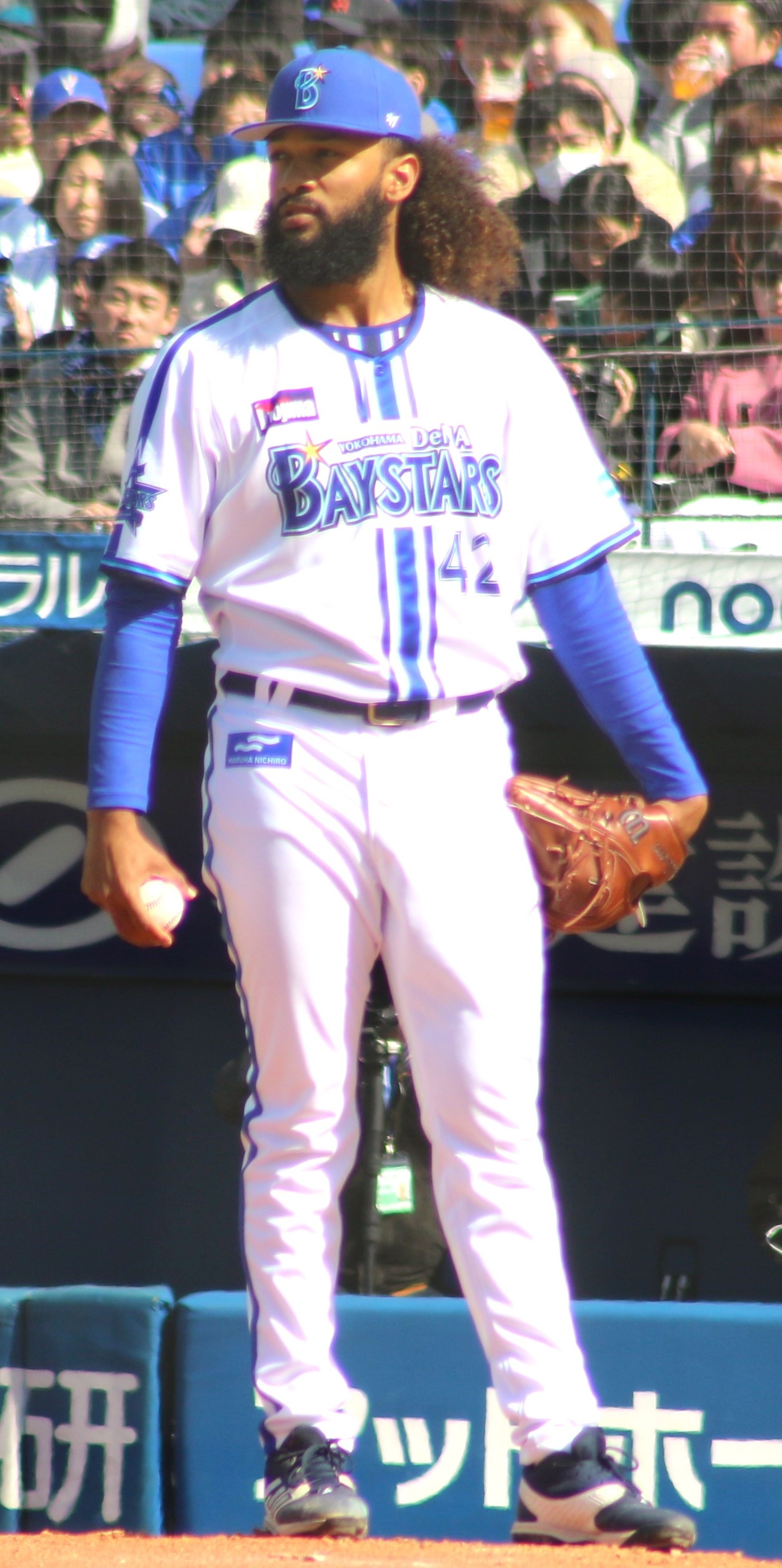
Andre Jackson pitched seven scoreless innings.

Thursday, October 31, 2024, 6:01 pm (JST) at Mizuho PayPay Dome in Fukuoka, Fukuoka Prefecture
Team	1	2	3	4	5	6	7	8	9	R	H	E
DeNA	0	0	1	3	0	0	0	0	3	7	13	0
SoftBank	0	0	0	0	0	0	0	0	0	0	4	0
WP: Andre Jackson (1–1) LP: Tomohisa Ohzeki (0–1); Home runs: DNA: Shugo Maki (1); SOF: None; Attendance: 36,636; Boxscore

The ceremonial first pitch was thrown out by Olympic bronze medalist fencer Shihomi Fukushima. Andre Jackson, DeNA's losing starting pitcher Game 1, started for the second time in the series on four days rest. Returning from an injury suffered in mid-September, SoftBank started Tomohisa Ohzeki for the first time in the postseason. The BayStars had five runners on base in the first two innings against Ohzeki but were unable to score. In the third inning they again had two more baserunners via singles by Shugo Maki and Mike Ford. This time, however, Yoshitomo Tsutsugo hit a single to drive in one run and give DeNA the lead. Tsutsugo's hit prompted SoftBank to take Ohzeki out of the game after only 2 2/3 innings. The BayStars went on to load the bases for a second straight inning but did not score again. The third Hawks pitcher of the game, Jun Maeda, opened the fourth inning. Against Maeda, DeNA lead off the inning with two back-to-back singles. Maki then hit a three-run home run to give them a 4–0 lead. Though unneeded, they scored three more runs in the ninth inning, including a two-RBI double by Koki Kajiwara.

Jackson pitched seven innings, the third straight BayStars starter to do so. He struck out eight batters and allowed no runs on three hits, two walks, and a hit batsman. After Jackson, the bullpen was able to keep the Hawks from scoring, handing the Hawks their second straight shutout loss. SoftBank scored only one run in all three of their Japan Series home games. By the end of Game 5, they had gone 26 consecutive innings without scoring, tying a Japan Series record.

=== Game 6 ===
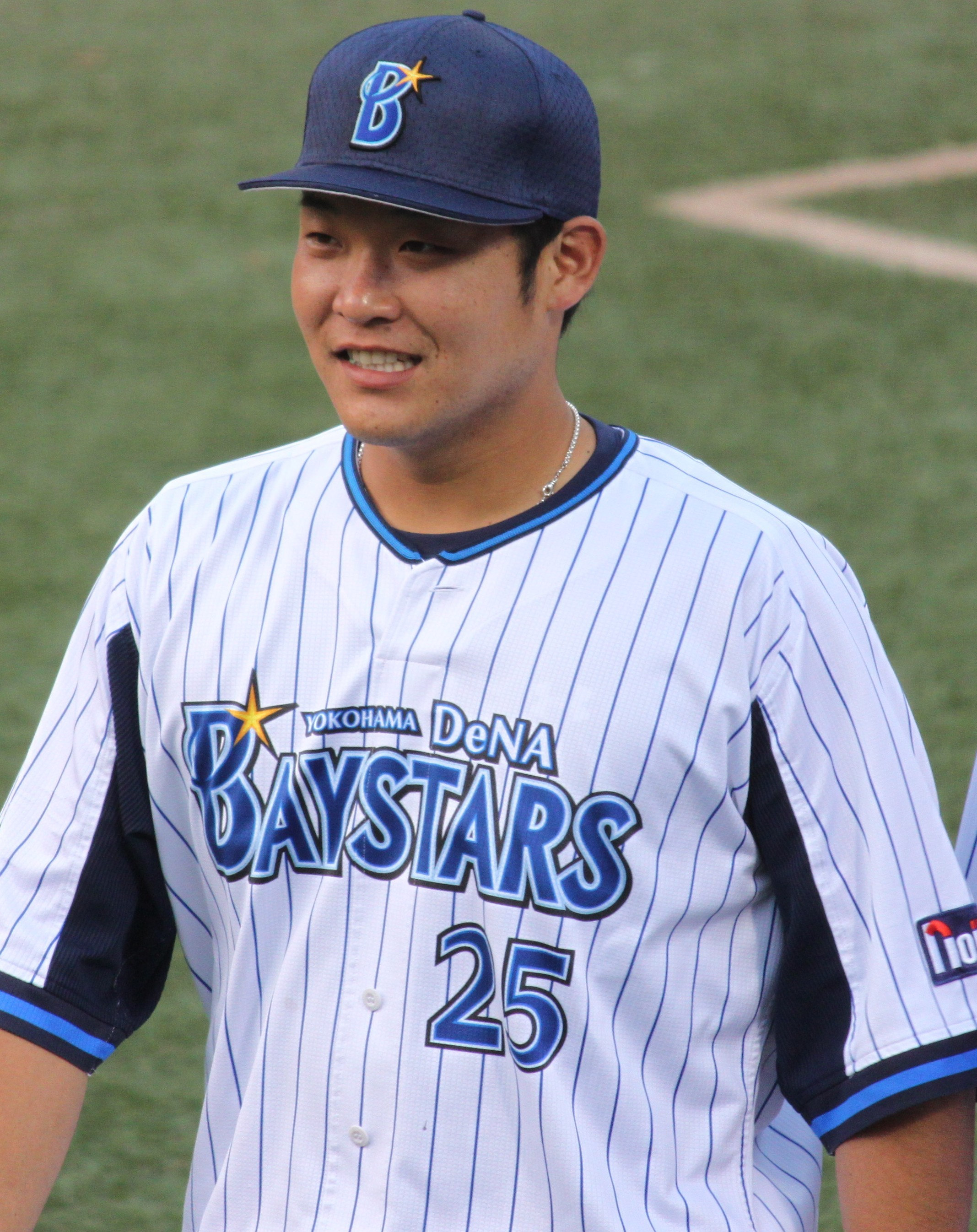
Yoshitomo Tsutsugo had four RBIs, including a home run in Game 6.

Sunday, November 3, 2024, 6:03 pm (JST) at Yokohama Stadium in Yokohama, Kanagawa Prefecture
Team	1	2	3	4	5	6	7	8	9	R	H	E
SoftBank	0	0	0	2	0	0	0	0	0	2	6	1
DeNA	0	3	1	0	7	0	0	0	X	11	13	0
WP: Yūya Sakamoto (1–0) LP: Kohei Arihara (1–1); Home runs: SOF: Yuki Yanagita (1); DNA: Yoshitomo Tsutsugo (1); Attendance: 33,136; Boxscore

Game 6 was originally scheduled to be played on November 2 but was postponed one day due to rain in Yokohama. The game's first pitch was thrown by former BayStars manager Kiyoshi Nakahata. Game 2 starter Ohnuki opened the game for the DeNA, while SoftBank started Arihara, their Game 1 starting pitcher. Ohnuki didn't allow a run through three innings, bringing the Hawks' consecutive scoreless innings streak to a record 29 innings, a new Japan Series record. SoftBank finally broke through and scored in the fourth inning; Kenta Imamiya reached base on his second hit of the game followed by a Yuki Yanagita home run that scored two runs. Ohnuki finished out the inning, but it would be his last.

The BayStars, however, scored the game's first run in the second inning when Tsutsugo led off the inning with a solo home run. They would go on to score two more that inning when Yasutaka Tobashira and Keito Mori consecutively reached base with a single and a double, respectively, and Kuwahara scored both with a two-run single. Arihara allowed a leadoff single the next inning and then consecutively hit a batsman walked and two batters without outs to force in DeNA's fourth run. Arihara was removed from the game after the inning. Game 3 starting pitcher Carter Stewart Jr. entered the fifth inning in relief after the Hawks' two runs in the fourth to cut the BayStars' lead to 4–2. Stewart loaded the bases and then walked Kuwahara and gave up a single to Kajiwara to bring the score to 6–2 and end his inning after only recording one out. With the bases still loaded, Austin was then hit by a pitch to drive in another run and Tsutsugo hit a bases-clearing, three-run double. Toshiro Miyazaki then doubled to drive Tsutsugo in and cap off the scoring in DeNA's seven-run inning. BayStars relief pitchers kept the Hawks from scoring again after the fourth inning and they went on to win the game and the series.

== Aftermath ==
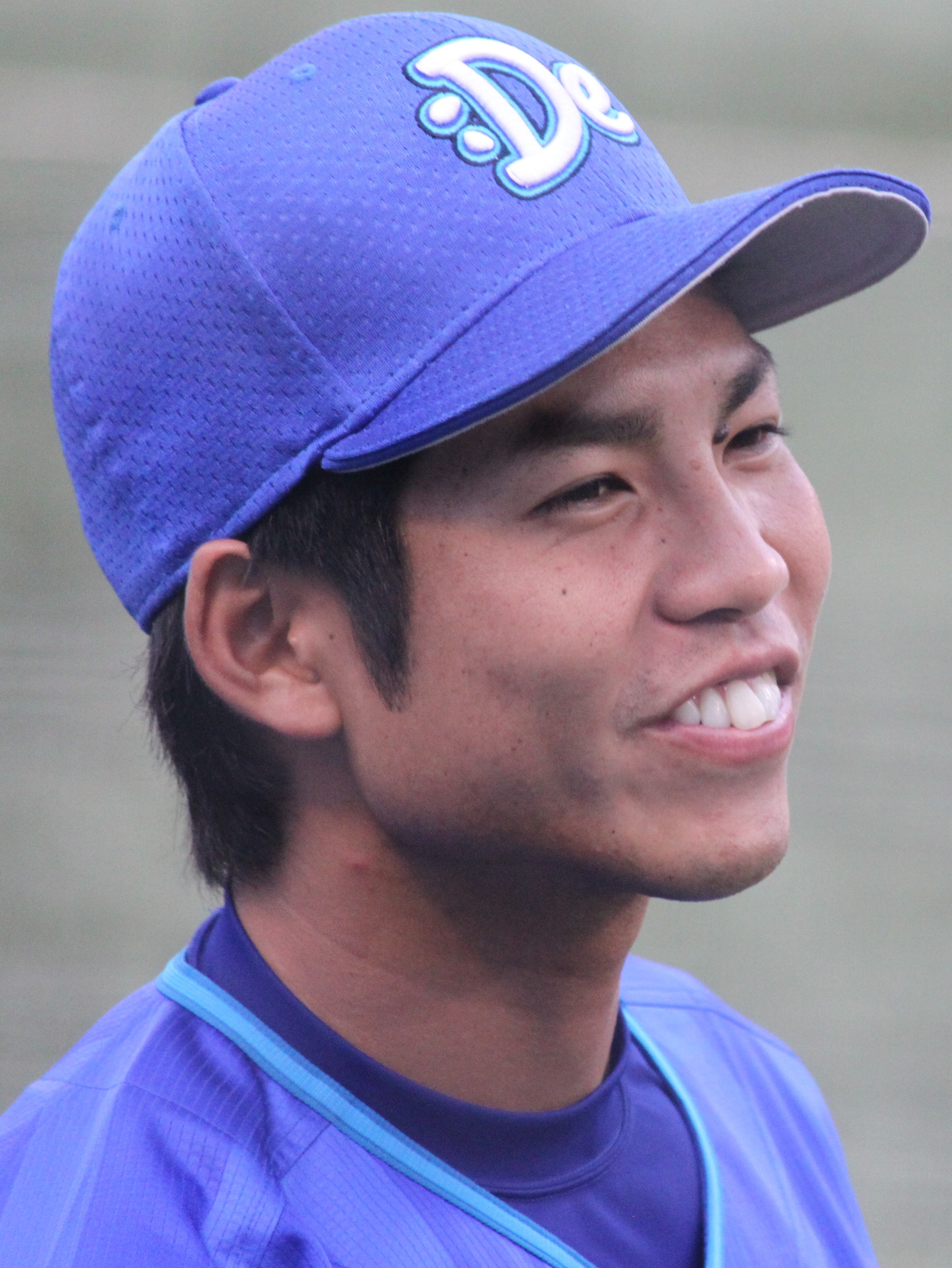
Masayuki Kuwahara was the series' MVP.

DeNA's upset win against SoftBank was their first Japan Series title in 26 years, their first championship since DeNA purchased the team, and their third overall. Their win was only the second time since the implementation of the playoffs that a team that finished the regular season in third place went on to win the Japan Series and the first time for Central League team. They also became the Japan Series champions with the lowest regular-season winning percentage. It has been called one of the biggest upsets in Japan Series history.

After the series, Masayuki Kuwahara was named the Japan Series Most Valuable Player. Kuwahara had an RBI in five consecutive games, a Japan Series record. He collected nine RBIs across games two through six, only the eighth player to have nine or more in the series, and one short of the record. He also had at least one hit in every game for a total of twelve for the series. Kenta Imamiya was given the Fighting Spirit Award, a title given to the best player on the losing team. DeNA's Yoshitomo Tsutsugo, Andre Jackson, and Anthony Kay were all named as recipients of the Outstanding Player Award. BayStars captain Shugo Maki was voted the SMBC Everyone's Cheering Award winner by fans. DeNA manager Daisuke Miura was the 20th person to win the Japan Series as both a player and a manager. After the series, he was named the Matsutaro Shoriki Award winner.

BayStars fans congregated outside of Yokohama Stadium during Game 6 and celebrated there after the team won the game and the series. A victory parade through Minato Mirai 21, Yokohama's central business district, featuring a player motorcade was held on November 30 to honor the team and its championship. The event started at the Hammerhead complex on the pier and the proceeded from there to Yokohama Stadium, 1.5 km away. The parade's operating costs were paid for via the sale of tickets to the starting event and the ability to participate in the parade. An estimated 300,000 fans attended the event and the estimated economic impact of the parade for the region was ¥12.4 billion.

== Media coverage ==
The Japan Series was televised in Japan by a variety of television stations and streaming services. Five of the seven games were to be broadcast by TBS, with NHK-BS, Fuji TV, and TV Asahi also carrying some games. All games were streamed online via TVer, with U-Next, Abema, and Fuji TV TWOsmart also streaming some games. Along with the networks' commentators, various former NPB players, coaches and managers also provided commentary during game broadcasts.

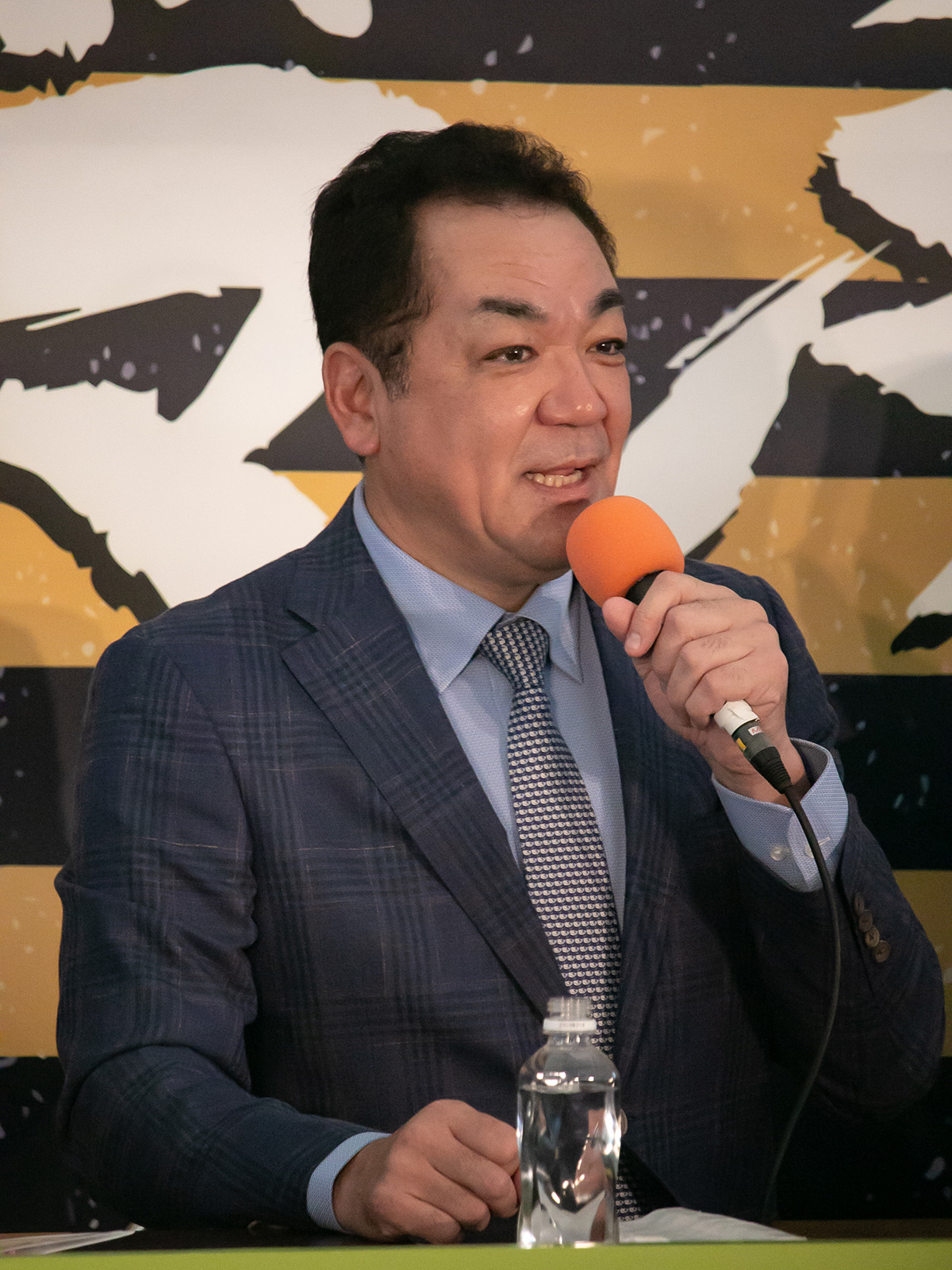
Former NPB player Hiromi Makihara was a commentator for three of the seven games.

Game	Networks	Streaming	Commentators	Ref
1	TBS	U-Next, TVer	Hiromi Makihara, Norichika Aoki, Keisuke Hatsuta	
2	TBS, NHK-BS	U-Next, TVer	Seiichi Uchikawa, Toshiya Sugiuchi, Etsuo Nitta	
3	Fuji TV, NHK-BS	Fuji TV TWOsmart, TVer	Norichika Aoki, Kimiyasu Kudo, Hirotoshi Sakanashi	
4	TBS	U-Next, TVer	Hiromi Makihara, Koji Akiyama, Keisuke Hatsuta	
5	TV Asahi	Abema, TVer	Tomoya Satozaki, Daiki Tanaka	
6	TBS	U-Next, TVer	Kazuhiro Sasaki, Seiichi Uchikawa, Masatoshi Namba	
7†	TBS	U-Next, TVer	Kiyoshi Nakahata, Hiromi Makihara, Wataru Ogasawara	

† If necessary

=== World Series controversy ===
In Japan, the 2024 World Series and Japan Series schedules aligned exactly with the World Series games airing in the morning and Japan Series games being shown later that same evening. With popular Japanese player Shohei Ohtani of the Los Angeles Dodgers playing in his first World Series, the event was covered heavily by the Japanese media. Prior to the start of both events, Hawks manager Kokubo expressed concern that the Japan Series would possibly be overshadowed, and pledged to play a series worthy of coverage by the Japanese media.

Fuji Television, the network that aired Game 3 of the Japan Series, was also broadcasting the World Series games in the morning in Japan. After the games, the station produced and aired World Series recap programs in a prime time timeslots that put them in direct competition with the other networks showing the first and second games of the Japan Series. NPB believed that due to Ohtani's involvement with the World Series, the recap programs would pull viewers' attention away from the Japan Series. In response, NPB stripped Fuji TV of its press passes to cover the entire Japan Series prior to the first game. NPB also intended to revoke Fuji TV's rights to broadcast Game 3 of the Japan Series but couldn't as it was under a broadcasting agreement separate from their coverage of the other games.

== See also ==
- 2024 Korean Series
