= Dave Leiper =

American baseball player (born 1962)

- Pitcher
- Born: June 18, 1962 (age 64); Whittier, California, U.S.
- Batted: Left Threw: Left

MLB debut
- September 2, 1984, for the Oakland Athletics

Last MLB appearance
- September 22, 1996, for the Montreal Expos

MLB statistics
- Win–loss record: 12–8
- Earned run average: 3.98
- Strikeouts: 150
- Stats at Baseball Reference

Teams
- Oakland Athletics (1984, 1986–1987); San Diego Padres (1987–1989); Oakland Athletics (1994–1995); Montreal Expos (1995); Philadelphia Phillies (1996); Montreal Expos (1996)

David Paul Leiper (born June 18, 1962) is an American former professional baseball pitcher. He played in Major League Baseball (MLB) during 1984–1996 for the Oakland Athletics, San Diego Padres, Montreal Expos, and Philadelphia Phillies.

In eight seasons, he had a win–loss record of 12–8 in 264 games pitched, 65 games finished, 7 saves, 278 innings pitched, 282 hits allowed, 141 runs allowed, 123 earned runs allowed, 25 home runs allowed, 114 walks, 150 strikeouts, 12 wild pitches, 17 intentional walks, 3 balks, 3.98 earned run average (ERA) and a WHIP of 1.424.

His brother Tim played baseball professionally before becoming a major-league coach.
