= Masayuki Kuwahara =

Japanese baseball player (born 1993)

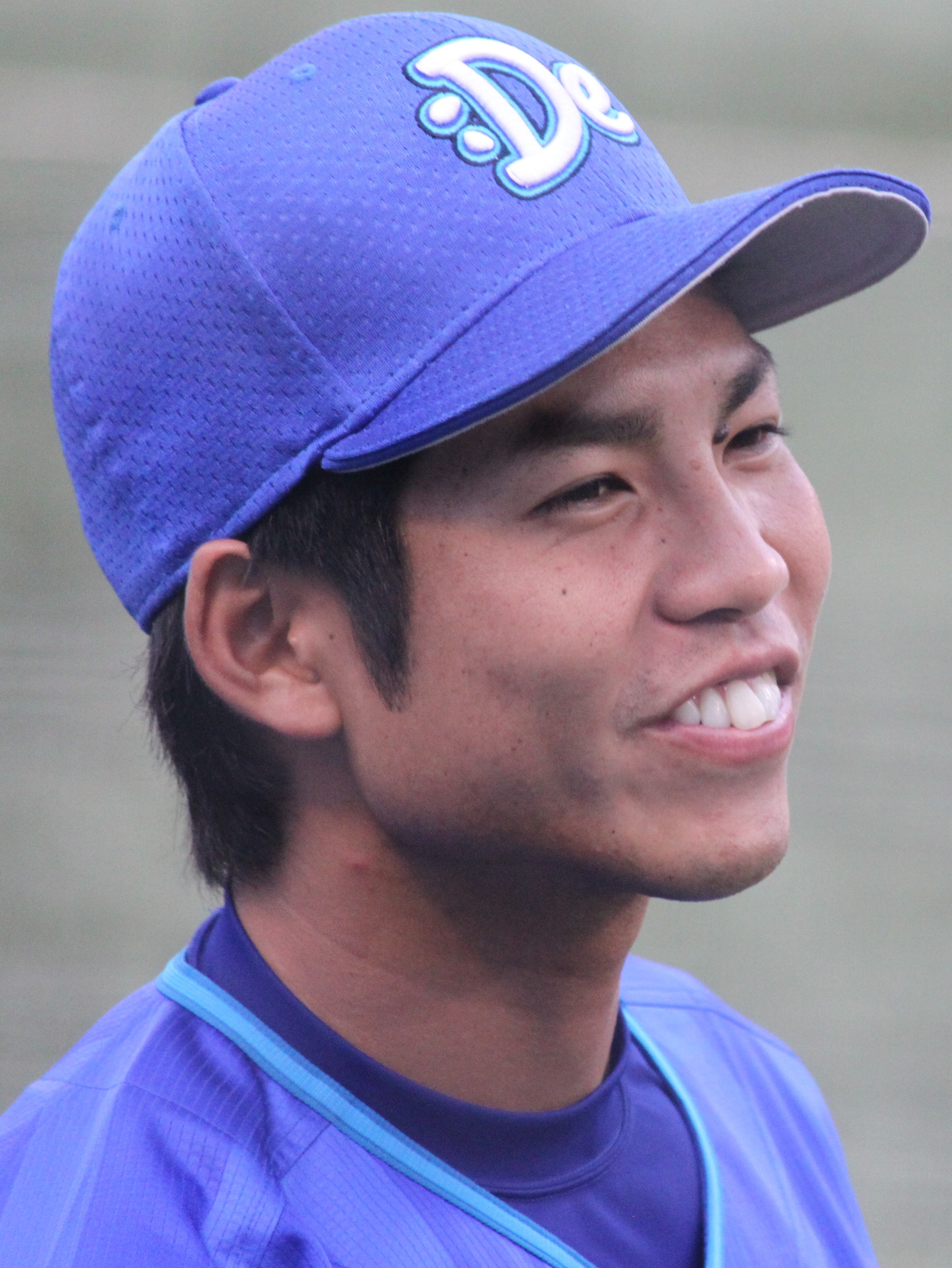
- Kuwahara with the Yokohama DeNA BayStars

Saitama Seibu Lions – No. 7
- Outfielder
- Born: July 21, 1993 (age 32); Izumi, Osaka, Japan
- Bats: Right Throws: Right

NPB debut
- October 1, 2012, for the Yokohama DeNA BayStars

NPB statistics (through 2025 season)
- Batting average: .267
- Home runs: 74
- Runs batted in: 322
- Stats at Baseball Reference

Teams
- Yokohama DeNA BayStars (2012–2025); Saitama Seibu Lions (2026–present)

Career highlights and awards
- Japan Series champion (2024); Japan Series Most Valuable Player Award (2024); 2× Golden Glove Award (2017, 2023); Hit for the cycle on July 20, 2018

Masayuki Kuwahara (桑原 将志, Kuwahara Masayuki; born July 21, 1993) is a Japanese professional baseball outfielder for the Saitama Seibu Lions of Nippon Professional Baseball (NPB). He has previously played in NPB for the Yokohama DeNA BayStars.

== Career ==
=== Yokohama DeNA BayStars ===
On July 20, 2018, Kuwahara hit for the cycle, becoming the 67th player in NPB history to do so.

Kuwahara made 106 appearances for the BayStars during the 2024 season, batting .270/.321/.365 with five home runs, 24 RBI, and eight stolen bases. With Yokohama, Kuwahara won the 2024 Japan Series, and was named the MVP of the series.

Kuwahara batted .267/.329/.393 with 74 home runs and 322 RBI in 1,239 appearances for the BayStars from 2012 to 2025.

=== Saitama Seibu Lions ===
On November 26, 2025, Kuwahara signed a contract with the Saitama Seibu Lions of Nippon Professional Baseball.
