= Katsuki Azuma =

Japanese baseball player (born 1995)

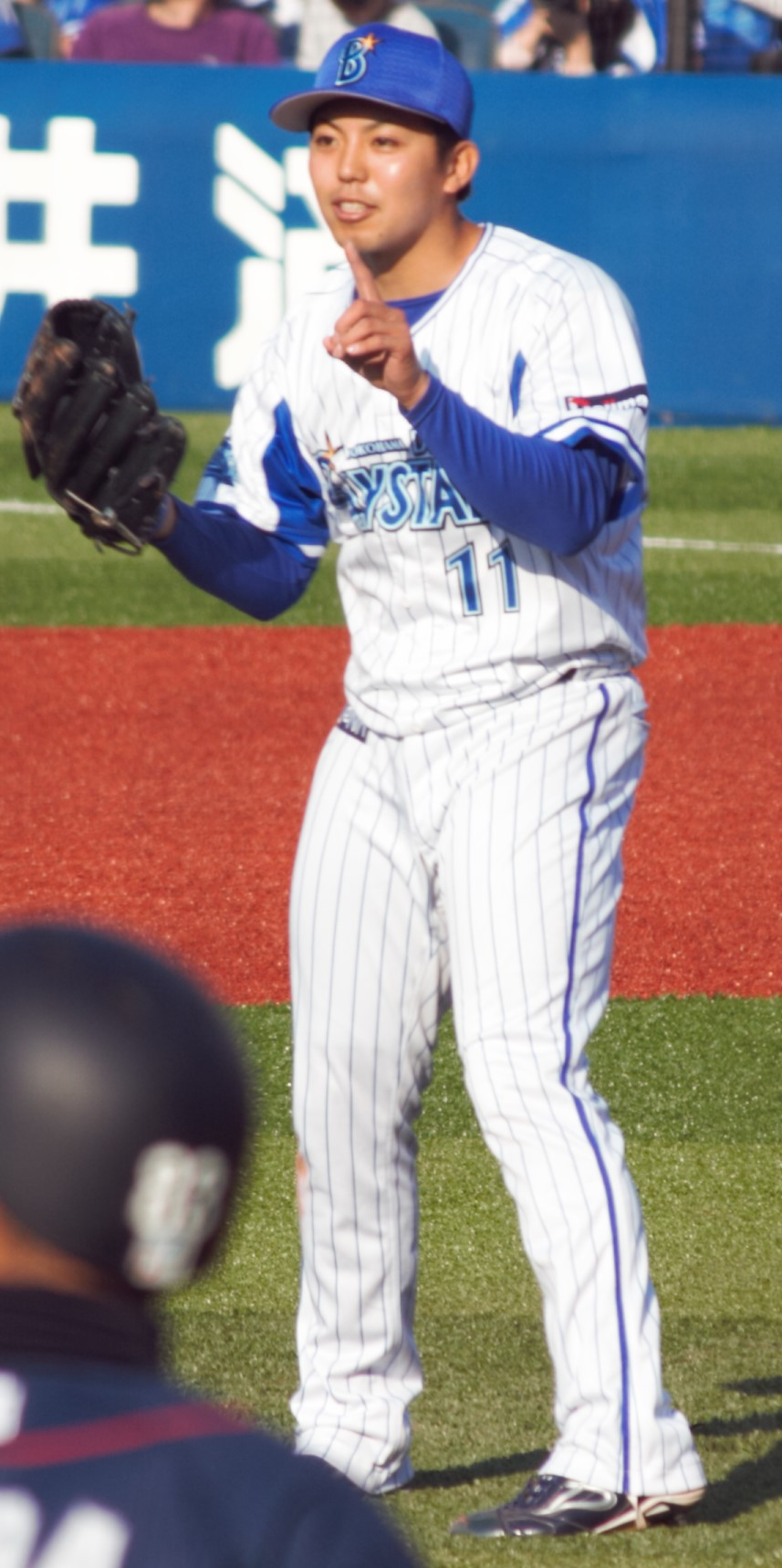
- Azuma with the Yokohama DeNA BayStars

Yokohama DeNA BayStars – No. 11
- Pitcher
- Born: November 29, 1995 (age 30); Yokkaichi, Mie, Japan
- Bats: Left Throws: Left

NPB debut
- April 5, 2018, for the Yokohama DeNA BayStars

Career statistics (through 2026 season)
- Win–loss record: 72–36
- Earned Run Average: 2.42
- Strikeouts: 763
- Stats at Baseball Reference

Teams
- Yokohama DeNA BayStars (2018–present)

Career highlights and awards
- Japan Series champion (2024); 3× NPB All-Star (2018, 2023, 2024); 2018 Central League Rookie of the Year

Katsuki Azuma (東 克樹, Azuma Katsuki; born November 29, 1995) is a Japanese professional baseball pitcher for the Yokohama DeNA BayStars of Nippon Professional Baseball (NPB).

He was selected to the 2018 NPB All-Star game. On October 10, 2018, he was selected to the Japan national baseball team at the 2018 MLB Japan All-Star Series, but on October 18, 2018, he opted not to participate.
