= Tim Leiper =

American baseball coach (born 1966)

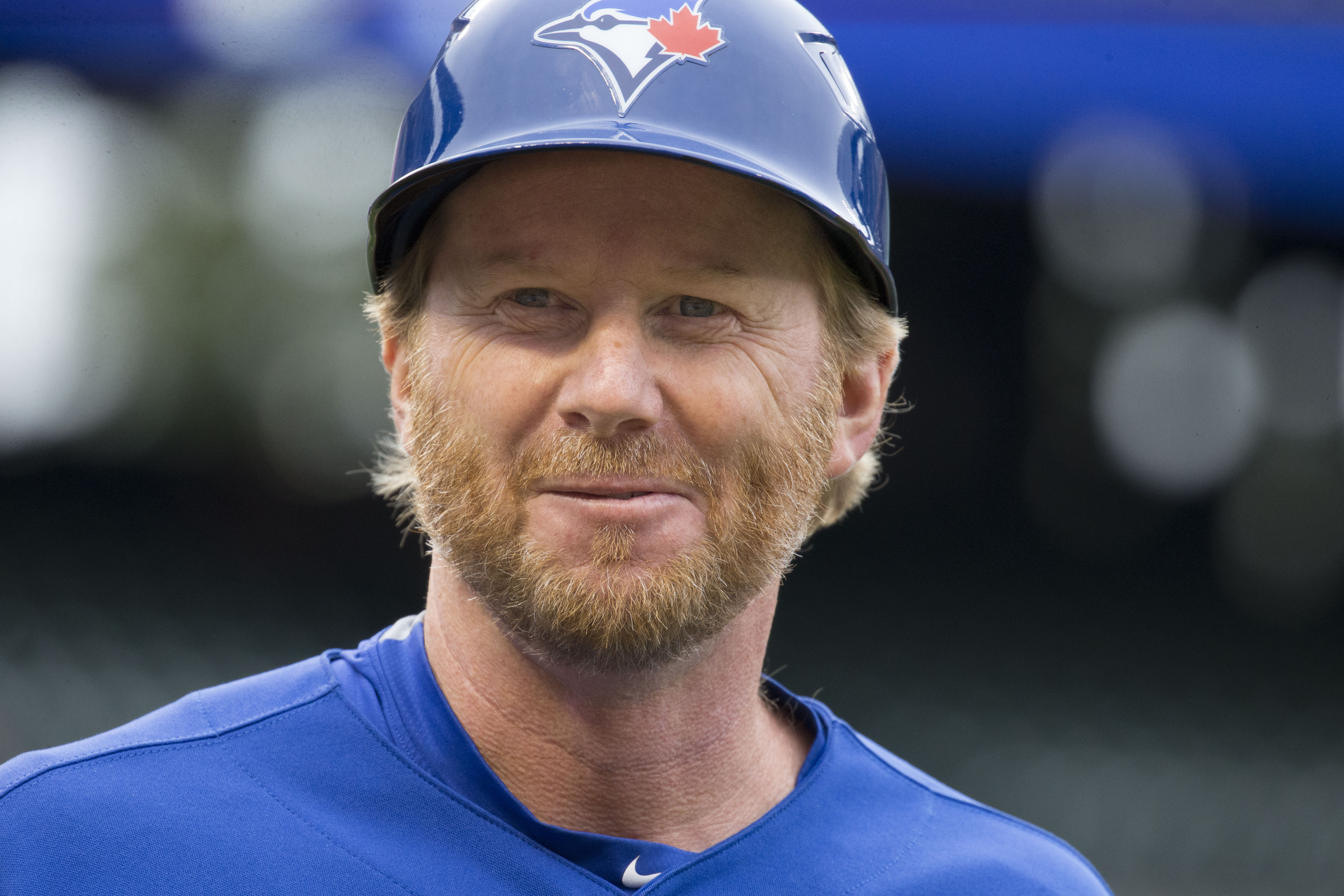
- Leiper with the Toronto Blue Jays in 2015

New York Mets – No. 63
- Coach
- Born: July 19, 1966 (age 60); Whittier, California, U.S.
- Bats: Left Throws: Right
- Stats at Baseball Reference

Teams
- Toronto Blue Jays (2014–2018); San Diego Padres (2024–2025); New York Mets (2026–present)

Timothy Joseph Leiper (born July 19, 1966) is an American professional baseball coach. He is the third base coach for the New York Mets of Major League Baseball (MLB). He previously was the first base coach for the Toronto Blue Jays from 2014 to 2018. and the third base coach for the San Diego Padres from 2024 to 2025.

Leiper, a former outfielder, had a 12-season (1985–1996) minor league playing career in the farm systems of the Detroit Tigers, Pittsburgh Pirates, New York Mets and Kansas City Royals, batting .273 with 40 home runs in 1,166 games and 3,910 at bats. The native of Whittier, California, attended Brea Olinda High School. He batted left-handed, threw right-handed, and was listed as 5 feet 11 inches (1.80 m) tall and 175 pounds (79 kg). His older brother Dave was a major league pitcher for eight seasons.

== Career ==
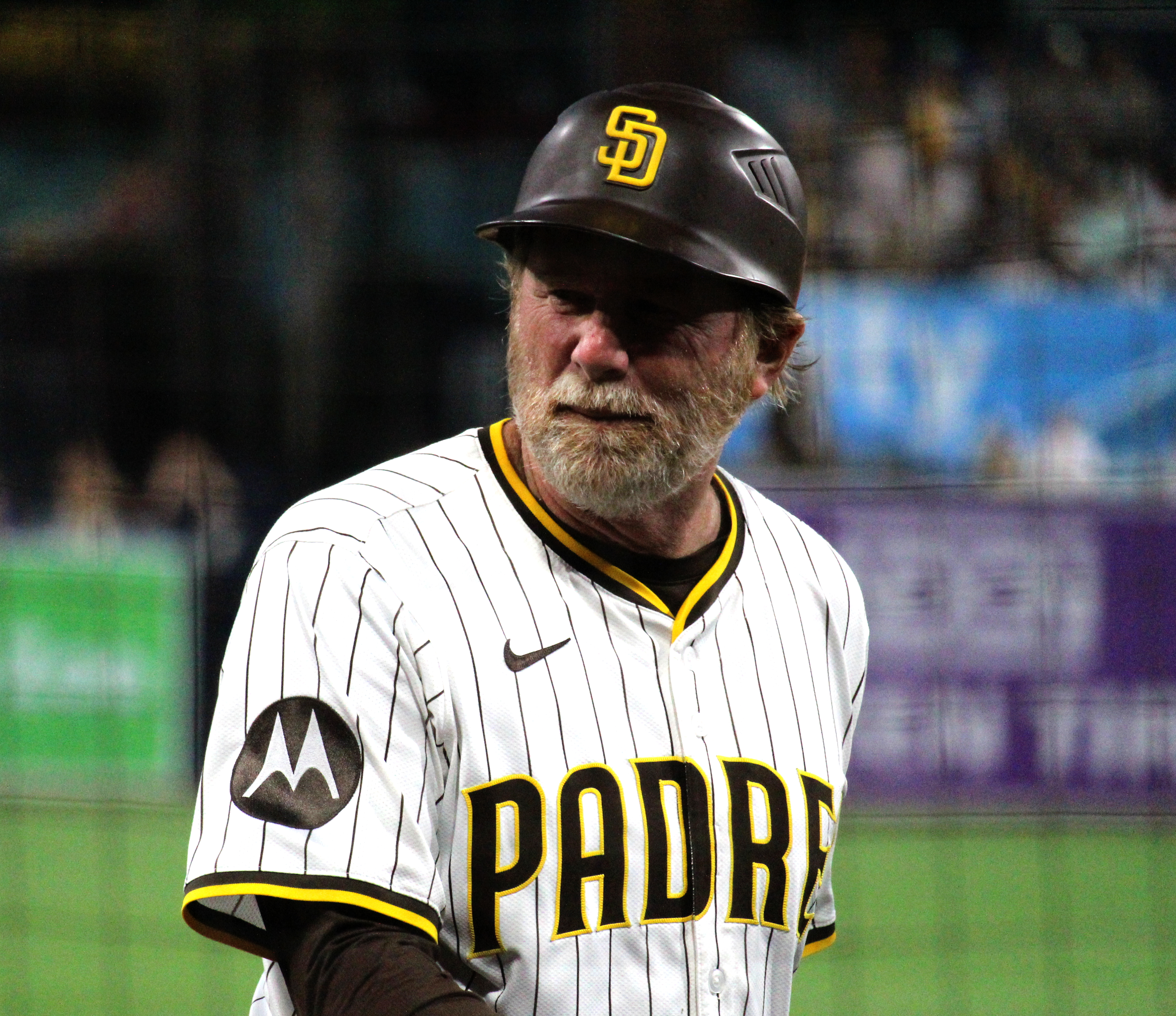
Leiper in 2025

Leiper's coaching career began while he was still an active player: he spent part of the 1992 season as an assistant baseball coach for North Carolina State University. In 1996, Leiper became a coach in the professional ranks, in the New York Mets' organization. He moved up to managing in 2000 in the Montreal Expos' organization, working at the Short Season-A and Class A levels before his promotion to the Triple-A Ottawa Lynx of the International League in 2002. After Leiper guided the Lynx to 80 wins in 143 games that season, he spent one season as manager of the Class A Sarasota Red Sox before returning to the Lynx in 2004, who were by then the Triple-A affiliate of the Baltimore Orioles. Leiper then spent four seasons in the Pittsburgh Pirates' system, including three as manager of the Double-A Altoona Curve, before joining the Florida Marlins in 2009. In 2010, he managed the Jacksonville Suns, the Marlins' Double-A affiliate, where he led them to the 2010 Southern League championship. He then served as the Marlins' roving minor league defensive coordinator in 2011 and 2012. In 2013, he was senior advisor for minor league operations for the Toronto Blue Jays before his promotion to Blue Jays manager John Gibbons' staff for 2014, his first year in Major League Baseball after 29 years as a minor league player, manager and instructor.

Beyond the United States and Canada, Leiper played for Cañeros de Los Mochis of the Mexican Pacific Winter League in 1993, and Águilas Cibaeñas in 1996, where his team won the Dominican Professional Baseball League championship. In 1999–2000 he coached for Pastora in the Venezuelan Professional Baseball League, as well as Aguilas, in 2007–08 in the Dominican winter league. Aguilas won both the Dominican championship and the Caribbean World Series.

Previously an offseason resident of Ottawa, Leiper has also been a coach on the 2004 Canadian Olympic team, and Canada's 2006, 2009, and 2013 World Baseball Classic squads. He was also a part of the Baseball Canada staff that won bronze medals at both the 2008 and 2011 Baseball World Cups and the gold medal in the 2011 Pan-American Games.

After manager John Gibbons parted ways with the Toronto Blue Jays after the 2018 season, Leiper was fired on November 3, having served as Toronto's first base coach since 2014.

Leiper was hired by the San Diego Padres as the third base coach for the 2024 season.

On November 7, 2025, the New York Mets hired Leiper for the same position.

== See also ==
- Baseball at the 2004 Summer Olympics – Team squads
- 2006 World Baseball Classic rosters
- 2009 World Baseball Classic rosters
- 2013 World Baseball Classic rosters

Preceded by Stan Hough; Dave Huppert	Ottawa Lynx manager 2002; 2004	Succeeded by Dave Huppert; Dave Trembley
Preceded by Tony Beasley	Altoona Curve manager 2006–2008	Succeeded by Matt Walbeck
Preceded by Brandon Hyde	Jacksonville Suns manager 2010	Succeeded by Andy Barkett
Preceded by Dwayne Murphy	Toronto Blue Jays first base coach 2014–2018	Succeeded by Mark Budzinski
Preceded by Matt Williams	San Diego Padres third base coach 2024–2025	Succeeded by TBD
