= Christoforos Robinson =

Greek baseball player (born 1972)

Christoforos Robinson (born 18 August 1972) is a Greek baseball player who competed in the 2004 Summer Olympics.
