= Alex Cremidan =

American baseball player

- Pitcher
- Born: January 15, 1981 (age 45); San Diego, California
- Bats: Left Throws: Right
- Stats at Baseball Reference

Alexander Cremidan (born January 15, 1981) is a former professional baseball pitcher. Cremidan played in the Arizona Diamondbacks minor league system from 2003 to 2005. He participated in the 2004 Summer Olympics as a member of Greece's baseball team.

== Baseball career ==
While playing college baseball at the University of California, San Diego in 2002, Cremidan, the grandson of four Greece natives, joined the Greece national baseball team. He pitched a no-hitter over Slovakia in the European pool B championship as the team prepared for the 2004 Summer Olympics as the host country. During his junior year, he finished with a 7-2 win-loss record and was named to the All-California Collegiate Athletic Association second team. He struggled with injuries in his senior season, posting a 6.21 earned run average in 11 games.

In June 2003, he was drafted in the 35th round of the Major League Baseball draft by the Arizona Diamondbacks. During his first minor league season in 2003, he pitched in 24 games in relief for the Missoula Osprey of the Pioneer League, ending the year with 15 saves and a 1.40 ERA. Cremidan was pitching with the Midwest League's South Bend Silver Hawks in 2004 before rejoining the Greece national team in early August for the Olympics. He pitched in four games during the tournament, as Greece failed to medal, finishing in seventh place.

Following the Olympics, Cremidan returned to South Bend for the remainder of the season, ending the year with seven saves and a 3.27 ERA in 32 games. He spent the 2005 season with the Lancaster JetHawks of the California League, appearing in 44 games in relief in what was his final professional season.
