= Cheng Chao-hang =

Taiwanese baseball player

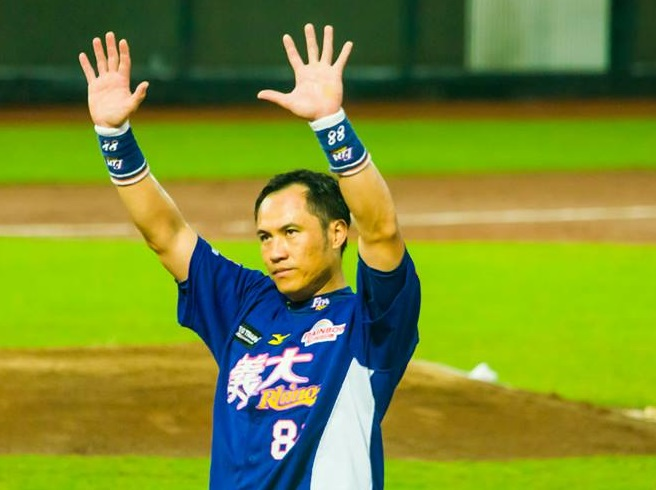
Cheng Chao-Hang

Cheng Chao-Hang (born 14 February 1977) is a Taiwanese baseball player who competed in the 2004 Summer Olympics.
