= David Francia =

Italian baseball player (born 1975)

Dave Francia
- Outfielder
- Born: 16 April 1975 (age 50); St. Petersburg, Florida, U.S.
- Bats: Left Throws: Left

David Anthony Francia (born 16 April 1975) is an Italian baseball player who competed in the 2004 Summer Olympics.
