= Giovanni Malagoli =

Italian painter (1856–1926)

Giovanni Malagoli (December 7, 1856 in Novellara, Reggio Emilia – October 11, 1926 in Velletri) was an Italian painter, depicting landscapes, genre, and still lifes of fruits and flowers.

He first attended gymnasium locally, then went to Modena to study for six years in its Academy of Fine Arts, under professor Malatesta. Among his works are: San Bernardino da Siena che trovasi a Novellara; Landscape with mill; Vecchia che fila; Lo stradone della Fossetta; and In riva al fiume.
