= Dimitrios Douros =

Greek baseball player (born 1980)

Dimitrios Douros (born June 3, 1980 in United States) is a former Olympic baseball player. He participated in the 2004 Summer Olympics, as a member of the Greece national baseball team.
