= Peter Rasmusen =

Greek baseball player (born 1980)

- Born: 30 October 1980 (age 44); Elgin, Illinois
- Bats: Right Throws: Right

Peter Chris Rasmusen (born 30 October 1980) is an American-Greek former baseball player who competed in the 2004 Summer Olympics. He played one minor league season for the High Desert Mavericks, the High-A affiliate of the Milwaukee Brewers at the time. He was an All-American at Triton College in 1999-2000. He hit the game winning home run for Stetson University in their upset of #3 ranked Georgia Tech in the Atlanta Regional of the College World Series in 2003.
