= Laurence Heisler =

American baseball player

- Pitcher
- Born: February 13, 1969 (age 56)
- Bats: Right Throws: Right
Medals
Men's baseball
Representing Greece
European Baseball Championship
Silver medal – second place	2003 Netherlands	National team

Laurence W. Heisler (born February 13, 1969) is a former professional baseball pitcher. Heisler played in the Philadelphia Phillies minor league system from 1992 to 1994. He participated in the 2004 Olympics, as a member of Greece's baseball team.
