= Kiyoshi Nakahata =

Japanese baseball player, manager, and coach

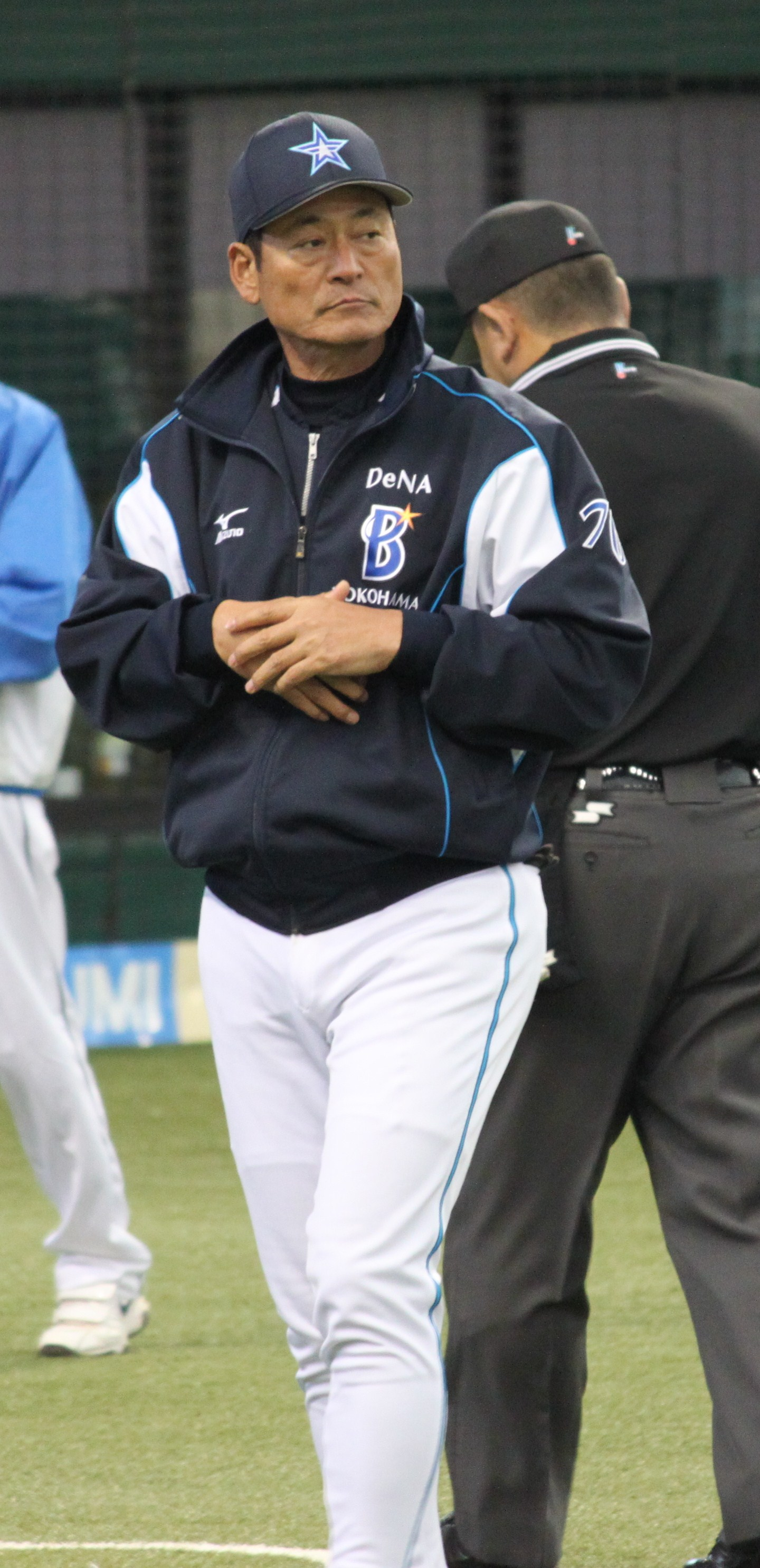
- Nakahata with the Yokohama DeNA BayStars
- Third baseman / Manager
- Born: January 6, 1954 (age 72); Fukushima Prefecture, Japan
- Batted: Right Threw: Right

debut
- July 17, 1977, for the Yomiuri Giants

Last appearance
- October 29, 1989, for the Yomiuri Giants

Career statistics
- Batting average: .290
- Home runs: 171
- Hits: 1294
- Stats at Baseball Reference

Teams
- As player: Yomiuri Giants (1976–1989); As manager: Yokohama DeNA BayStars (2012–2015); As coach: Yomiuri Giants (1993–1994)

Kiyoshi Nakahata (中畑 清, Nakahata Kiyoshi; born January 6, 1954) is a Japanese former Nippon Professional Baseball player. He played for the Yomiuri Giants (1976–1989).

He managed the Yokohama DeNA BayStars for four seasons from 2011 to 2015.
