= Luca Bischeri =

Italian baseball player (born 1979)

- Born: 12 June 1979 (age 47)
- Bats: Right Throws: Right

Luca Bischeri (born 12 June 1979) is an Italian baseball player who competed in the 2004 Summer Olympics.
