= Fabio Milano =

Italian baseball player (born 1977)

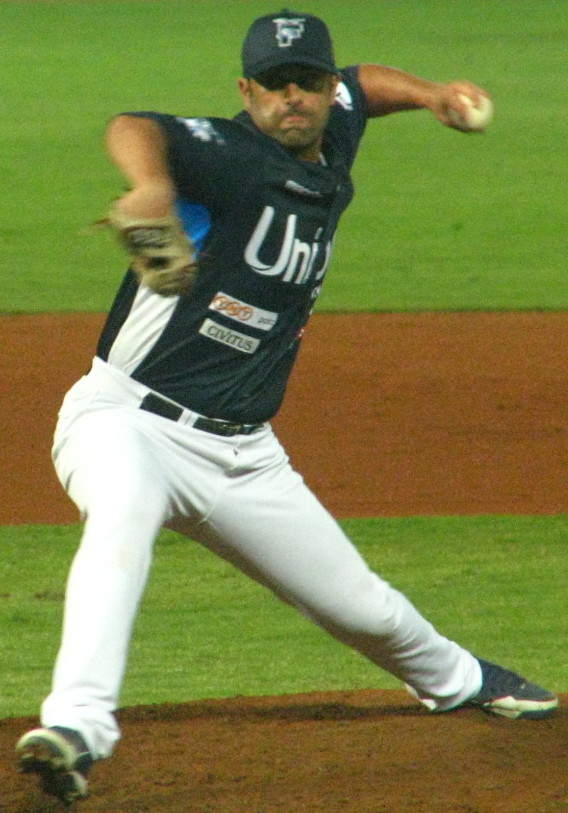
Fabio Milano,2013

Fabio Milano (born 2 August 1977) is an Italian baseball player who competed in the 2004 Summer Olympics.
