= Daniele Frignani =

Italian baseball player (born 1977)

Fortitudo Baseball
- Manager
- Born: 29 June 1977 (age 47); Bologna, Italy
- Bats: Right Throws: Right

Daniele Frignani (born 29 June 1977) is an Italian baseball player who competed in the 2004 Summer Olympics.
