= Vincent Parisi =

Italian baseball player (born 1978)

- Born: 7 February 1978 (age 48)
- Bats: Right Throws: Right

Vincent James Parisi (born 7 February 1978) is an Italian baseball player who competed in the 2004 Summer Olympics.

After his baseball career Parisi became a drivers ed and health teacher in the Pinellas County School District, he also owns a cafe with his wife in Palm Harbor Florida named "Canes Cafe".
