= Davide Dallospedale =

Italian baseball player (born 1977)

- Born: 2 September 1977 (age 49); Piacenza, Emilia-Romagna, Italy
- Bats: Right Throws: Right

Davide Dallospedale (born 12 September 1977) is an Italian baseball player who competed in the 2000 Summer Olympics and in the 2004 Summer Olympics. He also played in the 2006 World Baseball Classic and the 2009 World Baseball Classic.
