= Jairo Ramos Gizzi =

Venezuela-born Italian baseball player (born 1971)

- First baseman
- Born: 21 January 1971 (age 55); La Guaira, Venezuela
- Bats: Left Throws: Right

Jairo Rafael Ramos Gizzi [hy'-ro/rah'-mos/yeet'-se] (born 21 July 1971) is a Venezuela-born Italian former professional baseball first baseman. Ramos bats and throws left-handed. He last played for the T & A San Marino club of the Italian Baseball League.

== Career ==
As a member of the Italy national baseball team, Ramos competed in the 2004 Summer Olympics and won the 2010 European Baseball Championship.

Ramos, who debuted in the Italian League with Grosseto BBC in 1998, connected his 100th home run in the circuit during the 2013 season, as well as his 1,000th hit in 2014.

In between, Ramos played winter ball for the Leones del Caracas, Cardenales de Lara, Tiburones de La Guaira and Pastora de los Llanos clubs of the Venezuelan Professional Baseball League in a span of 19 seasons from 1989–2007. He also represented Venezuela in the 2006 Caribbean Series.
