= Igor Schiavetti =

Italian baseball player (born 1976)

- Born: 23 January 1976 (age 50); Nettuno, Lazio, Italy
- Bats: Right Throws: Right

Igor Schiavetti (born 23 January 1976) is an Italian baseball player who competed in the 2004 Summer Olympics.
