= Robin van Doornspeek =

Dutch baseball player (born 1981)

- Pitcher
- Born: February 25, 1981 (age 45); Velsen, Netherlands
- Bats: Right Throws: Right
Medals
Men's baseball
Representing Netherlands
European Baseball Championship
Gold medal – first place	2003 Netherlands	National team
Gold medal – first place	2005 Czech Republic	National team

Jersey Robin Jan van Doornspeek (born 25 February 1981) is a Dutch baseball coach and former baseball player. He was a pitcher for the Netherlands national team at the 2004 Summer Olympics in Athens, where he and his team finished sixth. He also pitched for the Dutch team at the 2006 World Baseball Classic, throwing 1 1/3 scoreless innings against Puerto Rico. He was also on the Dutch team that won the 2003 and 2005 European Baseball Championships.

van Doornspeek played for the Netherlands national youth team. He was named the best pitcher of the 1997 European youth championship and the most valuable player of the 1998 European championship. He also played shortstop as a youth player.

van Doornspeek made his debut with the Netherlands national team in 2002, pitching for the team in the 2002 Intercontinental Cup and Baseball World Cup, 2003 World Port Tournament, 2004 Haarlem Baseball Week, 2005 Baseball World Cup, and 2006 Haarlem Baseball Week. In the 2004 Olympics, van Doornspeek pitched in two games, allowing four runs in 4 2/3 innings pitched.

van Doornspeek also pitched in the Honkbal Hoofdklasse, the top Dutch league. He debuted in 1999 with Kinheim. He also played for Pioniers, Neptunus, and ADO. He worked as the closer during his first stint with Pioniers, earning 23 saves. He last played in the Hoofdklasse in 2009, missing 2010 recovering from elbow surgery.

After his playing career, van Doornspeek became a coach, first at youth levels. He was a coach at UVV Utrecht in 2017. He then became the pitching coach for the Netherlands national team and national youth team. He coached the team in the 2019 WBSC Premier 12, 2019 and 2021 European championships and 2022 Haarlem Baseball Week. He is currently the pitching coordinator for the national team.

van Doornspeek's father, Jersey van Doornspeek, also played and coached baseball in the Netherlands. His sister played softball.
