= Marcello Malagoli =

Italian baseball player (born 1973)

Marcello Malagoli (born 14 July 1973) is an Italian baseball player who competed in the 2004 Summer Olympics.
