= List of ballparks by capacity =

The following is a list of ballparks. They are ordered by capacity; which is the maximum number of spectators the stadium can accommodate in a normal game (ex: Tropicana Field can be expanded to more than 42,000 but is normally capped at 25,000). Currently, all baseball parks with a capacity of 20,000 or more are included.

== Baseball stadiums by capacity ==
#	Stadium	Capacity	City	Country	Home team(s)	Image
1	Dodger Stadium	56,000	Los Angeles	United States	Los Angeles Dodgers	
2	Estadio Latinoamericano	55,000	Havana	Cuba	Industriales	
3	Chase Field	48,633	Phoenix	United States	Arizona Diamondbacks	
4	T-Mobile Park	47,943	Seattle	United States	Seattle Mariners	
5	Koshien Stadium	47,400	Nishinomiya	Japan	Kōshien tournaments, Hanshin Tigers	
6	Coors Field	46,891	Denver	United States	Colorado Rockies	
7	Oakland Coliseum	46,847	Oakland	United States		
8	Yankee Stadium	46,537	New York City	United States	New York Yankees	
9	Great American Ball Park	45,814	Cincinnati	United States	Cincinnati Reds	
10	Angel Stadium of Anaheim	45,517	Anaheim	United States	Los Angeles Angels	
11	Oriole Park at Camden Yards	42,455	Baltimore	United States	Baltimore Orioles	
12	Busch Stadium	43,795	St. Louis	United States	St. Louis Cardinals	
13	Tokyo Dome	43,500	Tokyo	Japan	Yomiuri Giants	
14	Citizens Bank Park	42,901	Philadelphia	United States	Philadelphia Phillies	
15	Oracle Park	42,300	San Francisco	United States	San Francisco Giants	
16	American Family Field	41,900	Milwaukee	United States	Milwaukee Brewers	
17	Nationals Park	41,888	Washington	United States	Washington Nationals	
18	Citi Field	41,800	New York City	United States	New York Mets	
19	Wrigley Field	41,160	Chicago	United States	Chicago Cubs	
20	Truist Park	41,149	Atlanta	United States	Atlanta Braves	
21	Comerica Park	40,950	Detroit	United States	Detroit Tigers	
22	Daikin Park	40,950	Houston	United States	Houston Astros	
23	Rate Field	40,615	Chicago	United States	Chicago White Sox	
24	Globe Life Field	40,300	Arlington	United States	Texas Rangers	
25	Mizuho PayPay Dome Fukuoka	40,062	Fukuoka	Japan	Fukuoka SoftBank Hawks	
26	Taipei Dome	40,000	Taipei	Taiwan	None	
27	Fenway Park	39,928	Boston	United States	Boston Red Sox	
28	Petco Park	39,860	San Diego	United States	San Diego Padres	
29	Target Field	39,504	Minneapolis	United States	Minnesota Twins	
30	Rogers Centre	39,150	Toronto	Canada	Toronto Blue Jays	
31	PNC Park	38,496	Pittsburgh	United States	Pittsburgh Pirates	
32	La Rinconada Baseball Stadium	38,000	Caracas	Venezuela	Leones del Caracas	
33	Kauffman Stadium	37,903	Kansas City	United States	Kansas City Royals	
34	LoanDepot Park	37,446	Miami	United States	Miami Marlins	
35	Vantelin Dome Nagoya	36,418	Nagoya	Japan	Chunichi Dragons	
36	Kyocera Dome Osaka	36,220	Osaka	Japan	Orix Buffaloes	
37	Es Con Field Hokkaido	35,000	Kitahiroshima, Hokkaido	Japan	Hokkaido Nippon-Ham Fighters	
38	Kobe Sports Park Baseball Stadium	35,000	Kobe	Japan	some Orix Buffaloes games	
39	Progressive Field	34,820	Cleveland	United States	Cleveland Guardians	
40	Yokohama Stadium	34,046	Yokohama	Japan	Yokohama BayStars	
41	Mazda Stadium	31,984	Hiroshima	Japan	Hiroshima Toyo Carp	
42	Belluna Dome	31,552	Tokorozawa	Japan	Saitama Seibu Lions	
43	Rakuten Mobile Park Miyagi	31,272	Sendai	Japan	Tohoku Rakuten Golden Eagles	
44	Meiji Jingu Stadium	30,969	Tokyo	Japan	Tokyo Yakult Swallows	
45	Muscat Stadium	30,670	Kurashiki	Japan	None	
46	Botchan Stadium	30,136	Matsuyama	Japan	Ehime Mandarin Pirates	
47	Dennis Martínez National Stadium	30,100	Managua	Nicaragua	Indios del Boer	
48	Calixto García Íñiguez Stadium	30,000	Holguín	Cuba	Holguín	
49	Fukushima Azuma Baseball Stadium	30,000	Fukushima	Japan		
50	Iwaki Baseball Stadium	30,000	Iwaki	Japan		
51	Sun Marine Stadium	30,000	Miyazaki	Japan		
52	Nagano Olympic Stadium	30,000	Nagano	Japan		
53	Okinawa Cellular Stadium	30,000	Naha	Japan		
54	Niigata Prefectural Baseball Stadium	30,000	Niigata	Japan	Oisix Niigata Albirex BC	
55	Toyama Municipal Baseball Stadium Alpen Stadium	30,000	Toyama	Japan		
56	Kiyohara Baseball Stadium	30,000	Utsunomiya	Japan		
57	Estadio La Ceiba	30,000	San Félix	Venezuela		
58	Zozo Marine Stadium	29,916	Chiba	Japan	Chiba Lotte Marines	
59	Daegu Samsung Lions Park	29,178	Daegu	South Korea	Samsung Lions	
60	Estadio de Béisbol Monterrey	27,000	Monterrey	Mexico	Sultanes Monterrey	
61	Estadio Nacional de Panamá	27,000	Panama City	Panama	Águilas Metropolitanas	
62	Gwangju Baseball Stadium	27,000	Gwangju	South Korea	Kia Tigers	
63	Tropicana Field	25,000	St. Petersburg	United States	Tampa Bay Rays	
64	Estadio Guillermón Moncada	25,000	Santiago de Cuba	Cuba	Santiago de Cuba	
65	Akita Prefectural Baseball Stadium	25,000	Akita	Japan		
66	Hitachinaka Baseball Stadium	25,000	Hitachinaka	Japan		
67	Nagasaki Baseball Stadium	25,000	Nagasaki	Japan		
68	Jamsil Baseball Stadium	25,000	Seoul	South Korea	LG Twins, Doosan Bears	
69	Suwon Baseball Stadium	25,000	Suwon	South Korea	KT Wiz	
70	Charles Schwab Field Omaha	24,505	Omaha	United States	Creighton University also hosts College World Series (final round of NCAA championship)	
71	Sajik Baseball Stadium	24,500	Busan	South Korea	Lotte Giants	
72	Matsumoto Baseball Stadium	24,253	Matsumoto	Japan		
73	Estadio Luis Aparicio El Grande	24,000	Maracaibo	Venezuela	Águilas del Zulia	
74	Incheon SSG Landers Field	23,000	Incheon	South Korea	SSG Landers	
75	Gifu Prefectural Baseball Stadium	22,030	Gifu	Japan		
76	Kagawa Prefectural Baseball Complex	22,000	Takamatsu	Japan	Kagawa Olive Guyners	
77	Estadio Metropolitano	22,000	San Cristóbal	Venezuela		
78	Estadio Antonio Herrera Gutiérrez	22,000	Barquisimeto	Venezuela	Cardenales de Lara	
79	Victoria de Girón Stadium	22,000	Matanzas	Cuba	Matanzas	
80	Masan Baseball Stadium	21,885	Masan	South Korea	NC Dinos	
81	Kusanagi Stadium	21,656	Shizuoka	Japan		
82	Kamoike Ballpark	21,000	Kagoshima	Japan		
83	Estadio Universitario	20,723	Caracas	Venezuela		
84	Estadio Alfredo Harp Helú	20,062	Mexico City	Mexico	Diablos Rojos del México	
85	Taichung Intercontinental Baseball Stadium	20,035	Taichung	Taiwan	Chinatrust Brothers	
86	Estadio Tomateros	20,000	Culiacan	Mexico	Tomateros de Culiacan	
87	Chengching Lake Baseball Field	20,000	Kaohsiung	Taiwan	TSG Hawks	
88	Chiyodai Baseball Stadium	20,000	Hakodate	Japan		
89	Takasago Municipal Baseball Stadium	20,000	Takasago	Japan		
90	Taoyuan International Baseball Stadium	20,000	Taoyuan City	Taiwan	Rakuten Monkeys	

== See also ==
- Sapporo Dome (capacity: 53,796). Home of the Hokkaido Nippon Ham Fighters (2004-2022)
- Olympic Stadium (Montreal) (capacity: 49,757). Home of the Montreal Expos (1977-2004), and hosted Toronto Blue Jays exhibition games from 2014-2019
- Baseball field
- List of Major League Baseball stadiums
- List of U.S. baseball stadiums by capacity
- List of terraces at baseball venues
- List of jewel box baseball parks
- Lists of stadiums
