= 2003 Baseball World Cup =

Baseball tournament

XXXV Copa del Mundo de Béisbol Cuba 2003

Tournament details
- Country: Cuba
- Venues: 5 (in 4 host cities)
- Dates: 12–25 October
- Teams: 15

Final positions
- Champions: Cuba (24th title)
- Runners-up: Panama
- Third place: Japan
- Fourth place: Chinese Taipei

Tournament statistics
- Games played: 60

Awards
- MVP: (Japan) Takashi Yoshiura

The 2003 Baseball World Cup (BWC) was the 35th international Men's amateur baseball tournament. The tournament was sanctioned by the International Baseball Federation, which titled it the Amateur World Series from the 1938 tournament through the 1986 AWS. The tournament was held, for the ninth time, in Cuba, from October 12 to 25 in the cities of Havana, Matanzas, Santiago de Cuba and Holguín.

Cuba defeated Panama in the final, winning its 24th title.

There were 15 participating countries, split into two groups, with the first four of each group qualifying for the finals. Guam qualified as runner up of the Oceania World Cup Qualifier but did not take part in the tournament.

The next four competitions were also held as the BWC tournament, which was replaced in 2015 by the quadrennial WBSC Premier12.

== Qualification ==
Confederation	Berth(s)	Team	Qualification method	Ref.
Americas	7	Cuba	Qualified as hosts	
Americas	7	United States	2003 Pan American Games runners-up	
Americas	7	Mexico	2003 Pan American Games third place	
Americas	7	Nicaragua	2003 Pan American Games fourth place	
Americas	7	Brazil	2003 Pan American Games fifth place	
Americas	7	Panama	2003 Pan American Games sixth place	
Americas	7	Canada	Defeated Puerto Rico in qualifying series	
Asia	4	South Korea	2002 Asian Games winners	
Asia	4	Chinese Taipei	2002 Asian Games runners-up	
Asia	4	Japan	2002 Asian Games third place	
Asia	4	China	2002 Asian Games fourth place	
Europe	4	Netherlands	2001 European Championship winners	
Europe	4	Russia	2001 European Championship runners-up	
Europe	4	Italy	2001 European Championship third place	
Europe	4	France	2001 European Championship fourth place	

== Venues ==
Pool A, Quarterfinals, Semifinals & Championship	Pool B	Pool B	Pool A & Quarterfinals
Havana	Holguín	Santiago de Cuba	Matanzas
Estadio Latinoamericano	Estadio Calixto García	Estadio Guillermón Moncada	Estadio Victoria de Girón
Capacity: 55,000	Capacity: 30,000	Capacity: 25,000	Capacity: 22,000

== First round ==
=== Pool A ===
Pos	Team	Pld	W	L	RF	RA	RD	PCT	GB	Qualification
1	Cuba	6	6	0	52	5	+47	1.000	—	Advance to Knockout stage
2	Nicaragua	6	4	2	31	23	+8	.667	2	Advance to Knockout stage
3	Chinese Taipei	6	3	3	29	23	+6	.500 (Note: Head to head results: Canada 2–10 Chinese Taipei, South Korea 2–8 Chinese Taipei, South Korea 17–5 Canada)	3	Advance to Knockout stage
4	South Korea	6	3	3	51	25	+26	.500	3	Advance to Knockout stage
5	Canada	6	3	3	26	40	−14	.500	3	
6	Italy	6	1	5	23	28	−5	.167 (Note: Head to head results: Russia 1–9 Italy)	5	
7	Russia	6	1	5	12	80	−68	.167	5	

Source: International Baseball Federation
Notes:

12 October 2003; 15:00 (UTC–5)	Chinese Taipei	3 – 6	Cuba	Estadio Latinoamericano, Havana
12 October 2003; 15:00 (UTC–5)	LP: Tsai	Boxscore	WP: Vera	Estadio Latinoamericano, Havana

13 October 2003; 14:00 (UTC–5)	Russia	1 – 9	Italy	Estadio Latinoamericano, Havana
13 October 2003; 14:00 (UTC–5)	LP: Valyalin	Boxscore	WP: Marchesano	Estadio Latinoamericano, Havana

13 October 2003; 20:00 (UTC–5)	Canada	4 – 2	Nicaragua	Estadio Victoria de Girón, Matanzas
13 October 2003; 20:00 (UTC–5)	WP: Devey	Boxscore	LP: Rostrán	Estadio Victoria de Girón, Matanzas

14 October 2003; 14:00 (UTC–5)	Canada	10 – 0 (F/7)	Russia	Ciudad Deportiva, Havana
14 October 2003; 14:00 (UTC–5)	WP: Alexander	Boxscore	LP: Donetski	Ciudad Deportiva, Havana

14 October 2003; 14:00 (UTC–5)	Nicaragua	5 – 2	Chinese Taipei	Estadio Latinoamericano, Havana
14 October 2003; 14:00 (UTC–5)	WP: Juárez	Boxscore	LP: Chuang	Estadio Latinoamericano, Havana

14 October 2003; 20:00 (UTC–5)	South Korea	0 – 4	Cuba	Estadio Latinoamericano, Havana
14 October 2003; 20:00 (UTC–5)	LP: Cha	Boxscore	WP: Odelín	Estadio Latinoamericano, Havana

15 October 2003; 14:00 (UTC–5)	Italy	5 – 6	Nicaragua	Ciudad Deportiva, Havana
15 October 2003; 14:00 (UTC–5)	LP: De Santis	Boxscore	WP: López	Ciudad Deportiva, Havana

15 October 2003; 20:00 (UTC–5)	Russia	3 – 26 (F/7)	South Korea	Estadio Victoria de Girón, Matanzas
15 October 2003; 20:00 (UTC–5)	LP: Makhmudov	Boxscore	WP: Lee Sang-woo	Estadio Victoria de Girón, Matanzas

15 October 2003; 20:00 (UTC–5)	Canada	2 – 10	Chinese Taipei	Estadio Latinoamericano, Havana
15 October 2003; 20:00 (UTC–5)	LP: Jones	Boxscore	WP: Su	Estadio Latinoamericano, Havana

17 October 2003; 14:00 (UTC–5)	Canada	5 – 3	Italy	Estadio Victoria de Girón, Matanzas
17 October 2003; 14:00 (UTC–5)	WP: Crowther	Boxscore	WP: Martignoni	Estadio Victoria de Girón, Matanzas

17 October 2003; 14:00 (UTC–5)	South Korea	2 – 8	Chinese Taipei	Estadio Latinoamericano, Havana
17 October 2003; 14:00 (UTC–5)	LP: Son	Boxscore	WP: Chen	Estadio Latinoamericano, Havana

17 October 2003; 20:00 (UTC–5)	Russia	1 – 20 (F/7)	Cuba	Estadio Latinoamericano, Havana
17 October 2003; 20:00 (UTC–5)	LP: Valyalin	Boxscore	WP: Martínez	Estadio Latinoamericano, Havana

18 October 2003; 14:00 (UTC–5)	South Korea	17 – 5 (F/7)	Canada	Ciudad Deportiva, Havana
18 October 2003; 14:00 (UTC–5)	WP: Lee Jae-young	Boxscore	LP: Devey	Ciudad Deportiva, Havana

18 October 2003; 20:00 (UTC–5)	Nicaragua	14 – 3	Russia	Estadio Victoria de Girón, Matanzas
18 October 2003; 20:00 (UTC–5)	WP: Peña	Boxscore	LP: Makhmudov	Estadio Victoria de Girón, Matanzas

18 October 2003; 20:00 (UTC–5)	Italy	0 – 7	Cuba	Estadio Latinoamericano, Havana
18 October 2003; 20:00 (UTC–5)	LP: Lucena	Boxscore	WP: Romero	Estadio Latinoamericano, Havana

19 October 2003; 14:00 (UTC–5)	Nicaragua	3 – 2	South Korea	Estadio Latinoamericano, Havana
19 October 2003; 14:00 (UTC–5)	WP: Rostrán	Boxscore	LP: Kim	Estadio Latinoamericano, Havana

19 October 2003; 20:00 (UTC–5)	Italy	4 – 5	Chinese Taipei	Estadio Victoria de Girón, Matanzas
19 October 2003; 20:00 (UTC–5)	LP: Marchesano	Boxscore	WP: Su	Estadio Victoria de Girón, Matanzas

19 October 2003; 20:00 (UTC–5)	Cuba	8 – 0	Canada	Estadio Latinoamericano, Havana
19 October 2003; 20:00 (UTC–5)	WP: Palma	Boxscore	LP: Alexander	Estadio Latinoamericano, Havana

20 October 2003; 14:00 (UTC–5)	Chinese Taipei	1 – 4	Russia	Estadio Latinoamericano, Havana
20 October 2003; 14:00 (UTC–5)	LP: Cheng	Boxscore	WP: Valyalin	Estadio Latinoamericano, Havana

20 October 2003; 20:00 (UTC–5)	Italy	2 – 4	South Korea	Estadio Victoria de Girón, Matanzas
20 October 2003; 20:00 (UTC–5)	LP: Patrone	Boxscore	WP: Lee Jae-young	Estadio Victoria de Girón, Matanzas

20 October 2003; 20:00 (UTC–5)	Cuba	7 – 1	Nicaragua	Estadio Latinoamericano, Havana
20 October 2003; 20:00 (UTC–5)	WP: Martínez	Boxscore	LP: Rayo	Estadio Latinoamericano, Havana

=== Pool B ===
==== Standings ====
Pos	Team	W	L	RS	RA
1	Japan	7	0	74	16
2	United States	5	1	42	11
3	Panama	5	2	67	36
4	Brazil	4	3	27	34
5	Netherlands	3	3	35	26
6	Mexico	2	5	35	30
7	China	1	6	14	63
8	France	0	7	13	91

==== Schedule and results ====
12 October 2003; 20:00 (UTC–5)	Japan	12 – 2 (F/7)	Netherlands	Estadio Guillermón Moncada, Santiago de Cuba
12 October 2003; 20:00 (UTC–5)		Boxscore		Estadio Guillermón Moncada, Santiago de Cuba

12 October 2003; 20:00 (UTC–5)	Mexico	0 – 4	United States	Estadio Calixto García, Holguín
12 October 2003; 20:00 (UTC–5)		Boxscore		Estadio Calixto García, Holguín

13 October 2003; 20:00 (UTC–5)	China	6 – 5	France	Estadio Guillermón Moncada, Santiago de Cuba
13 October 2003; 20:00 (UTC–5)		Boxscore		Estadio Guillermón Moncada, Santiago de Cuba

13 October 2003; 20:00 (UTC–5)	Brazil	6 – 11	Panama	Estadio Calixto García, Holguín
13 October 2003; 20:00 (UTC–5)		Boxscore		Estadio Calixto García, Holguín

14 October 2003; 14:00 (UTC–5)	Netherlands	12 – 5	China	Estadio Guillermón Moncada, Santiago de Cuba
14 October 2003; 14:00 (UTC–5)		Boxscore		Estadio Guillermón Moncada, Santiago de Cuba

14 October 2003; 14:00 (UTC–5)	Panama	7 – 3	Mexico	Estadio Calixto García, Holguín
14 October 2003; 14:00 (UTC–5)		Boxscore		Estadio Calixto García, Holguín

14 October 2003; 20:00 (UTC–5)	France	0 – 18 (F/7)	Japan	Estadio Guillermón Moncada, Santiago de Cuba
14 October 2003; 20:00 (UTC–5)		Boxscore		Estadio Guillermón Moncada, Santiago de Cuba

14 October 2003; 20:00 (UTC–5)	United States	7 – 1	Brazil	Estadio Calixto García, Holguín
14 October 2003; 20:00 (UTC–5)		Boxscore		Estadio Calixto García, Holguín

15 October 2003; 14:00 (UTC–5)	Netherlands	12 – 0 (F/7)	France	Estadio Guillermón Moncada, Santiago de Cuba
15 October 2003; 14:00 (UTC–5)		Boxscore		Estadio Guillermón Moncada, Santiago de Cuba

15 October 2003; 14:00 (UTC–5)	Brazil	5 – 3	Mexico	Estadio Calixto García, Holguín
15 October 2003; 14:00 (UTC–5)		Boxscore		Estadio Calixto García, Holguín

15 October 2003; 20:00 (UTC–5)	Japan	16 – 1 (F/7)	China	Estadio Guillermón Moncada, Santiago de Cuba
15 October 2003; 20:00 (UTC–5)		Boxscore		Estadio Guillermón Moncada, Santiago de Cuba

15 October 2003; 20:00 (UTC–5)	Panama	5 – 12	United States	Estadio Calixto García, Holguín
15 October 2003; 20:00 (UTC–5)		Boxscore		Estadio Calixto García, Holguín

17 October 2003; 14:00 (UTC–5)	Netherlands	2 – 4	Panama	Estadio Guillermón Moncada, Santiago de Cuba
17 October 2003; 14:00 (UTC–5)		Boxscore		Estadio Guillermón Moncada, Santiago de Cuba

17 October 2003; 14:00 (UTC–5)	United States	14 – 2 (F/7)	France	Estadio Calixto García, Holguín
17 October 2003; 14:00 (UTC–5)		Boxscore		Estadio Calixto García, Holguín

17 October 2003; 20:00 (UTC–5)	Japan	8 – 2	Brazil	Estadio Guillermón Moncada, Santiago de Cuba
17 October 2003; 20:00 (UTC–5)		Boxscore		Estadio Guillermón Moncada, Santiago de Cuba

17 October 2003; 20:00 (UTC–5)	Mexico	5 – 0	China	Estadio Calixto García, Holguín
17 October 2003; 20:00 (UTC–5)		Boxscore		Estadio Calixto García, Holguín

18 October 2003; 14:00 (UTC–5)	Brazil	2 – 1	Netherlands	Estadio Guillermón Moncada, Santiago de Cuba
18 October 2003; 14:00 (UTC–5)		Boxscore		Estadio Guillermón Moncada, Santiago de Cuba

18 October 2003; 14:00 (UTC–5)	France	0 – 15 (F/7)	Mexico	Estadio Calixto García, Holguín
18 October 2003; 14:00 (UTC–5)		Boxscore		Estadio Calixto García, Holguín

18 October 2003; 20:00 (UTC–5)	Japan	10 – 4	Panama	Estadio Guillermón Moncada, Santiago de Cuba
18 October 2003; 20:00 (UTC–5)		Boxscore		Estadio Guillermón Moncada, Santiago de Cuba

18 October 2003; 20:00 (UTC–5)	United States	4 – 1	China	Estadio Calixto García, Holguín
18 October 2003; 20:00 (UTC–5)		Boxscore		Estadio Calixto García, Holguín

19 October 2003; 14:00 (UTC–5)	Mexico	3 – 6	Netherlands	Estadio Guillermón Moncada, Santiago de Cuba
19 October 2003; 14:00 (UTC–5)		Boxscore		Estadio Guillermón Moncada, Santiago de Cuba

19 October 2003; 14:00 (UTC–5)	France	4 – 7	Brazil	Estadio Calixto García, Holguín
19 October 2003; 14:00 (UTC–5)		Boxscore		Estadio Calixto García, Holguín

19 October 2003; 20:00 (UTC–5)	United States	1 – 2	Japan	Estadio Guillermón Moncada, Santiago de Cuba
19 October 2003; 20:00 (UTC–5)		Boxscore		Estadio Guillermón Moncada, Santiago de Cuba

19 October 2003; 20:00 (UTC–5)	China	1 – 17 (F/8)	Panama	Estadio Calixto García, Holguín
19 October 2003; 20:00 (UTC–5)		Boxscore		Estadio Calixto García, Holguín

20 October 2003; 14:00 (UTC–5)	Netherlands	Rainout	United States	Estadio Guillermón Moncada, Santiago de Cuba
20 October 2003; 14:00 (UTC–5)		Boxscore		Estadio Guillermón Moncada, Santiago de Cuba

20 October 2003; 14:00 (UTC–5)	China	0 – 4	Brazil	Estadio Calixto García, Holguín
20 October 2003; 14:00 (UTC–5)		Boxscore		Estadio Calixto García, Holguín

20 October 2003; 20:00 (UTC–5)	Mexico	6 – 8	Japan	Estadio Guillermón Moncada, Santiago de Cuba
20 October 2003; 20:00 (UTC–5)		Boxscore		Estadio Guillermón Moncada, Santiago de Cuba

20 October 2003; 20:00 (UTC–5)	Panama	19 – 2 (F/7)	France	Estadio Calixto García, Holguín
20 October 2003; 20:00 (UTC–5)		Boxscore		Estadio Calixto García, Holguín

== Playoffs ==
=== Bracket ===
Quarter-finals
Cuba	4
Brazil	3
United States	1
Chinese Taipei	2
Nicaragua	0
Panama	5
Japan	2
South Korea	0

Semi-finals
Cuba	6
Chinese Taipei	3
Panama	4
Japan	1

Final
Cuba	4
Panama	2
Third place
Chinese Taipei	3
Japan	7

5th–8th place
Brazil	4
United States	13
Nicaragua	5
South Korea	3

Fifth place
United States	13
Nicaragua	2
Seventh place
Brazil	8
South Korea	3

=== Quarter-finals ===
22 October 2003; 14:00 (UTC–5)	Nicaragua	0 – 5	Panama	Estadio Victoria de Girón, Matanzas
22 October 2003; 14:00 (UTC–5)		Boxscore		Estadio Victoria de Girón, Matanzas

22 October 2003; 14:00 (UTC–5)	United States	1 – 2	Chinese Taipei	Estadio Latinoamericano, Havana
22 October 2003; 14:00 (UTC–5)		Boxscore		Estadio Latinoamericano, Havana

22 October 2003; 20:00 (UTC–5)	Japan	2 – 0	South Korea	Estadio Victoria de Girón, Matanzas
22 October 2003; 20:00 (UTC–5)		Boxscore		Estadio Victoria de Girón, Matanzas

22 October 2003; 20:05 (UTC–5)	Cuba	4 – 3	Brazil	Estadio Latinoamericano, Havana
22 October 2003; 20:05 (UTC–5)		Boxscore		Estadio Latinoamericano, Havana

=== 5th–8th place ===
23 October 2003; 14:00 (UTC–5)	Nicaragua	5 – 3	South Korea	Ciudad Deportiva, Havana
23 October 2003; 14:00 (UTC–5)		Boxscore		Ciudad Deportiva, Havana

23 October 2003; 20:00 (UTC–5)	United States	13 – 4	Brazil	Estadio Victoria de Girón, Matanzas
23 October 2003; 20:00 (UTC–5)		Boxscore		Estadio Victoria de Girón, Matanzas

=== Semi-finals ===
23 October 2003; 14:00 (UTC–5)	Panama	4 – 1	Japan	Estadio Latinoamericano, Havana
23 October 2003; 14:00 (UTC–5)		Boxscore		Estadio Latinoamericano, Havana

23 October 2003; 20:05 (UTC–5)	Chinese Taipei	3 – 6	Cuba	Estadio Latinoamericano, Havana
23 October 2003; 20:05 (UTC–5)		Boxscore		Estadio Latinoamericano, Havana

=== 7th place game ===
24 October 2003; 14:00 (UTC–5)	South Korea	3 – 8	Brazil	Estadio Latinoamericano, Havana
24 October 2003; 14:00 (UTC–5)		Boxscore		Estadio Latinoamericano, Havana

=== 5th place game ===
24 October 2003; 20:05 (UTC–5)	United States	13 – 2	Nicaragua	Estadio Latinoamericano, Havana
24 October 2003; 20:05 (UTC–5)		Boxscore		Estadio Latinoamericano, Havana

=== Bronze medal game ===
25 October 2003; 14:00 (UTC–5)	Chinese Taipei	3 – 7	Japan	Estadio Latinoamericano, Havana
25 October 2003; 14:00 (UTC–5)		Boxscore		Estadio Latinoamericano, Havana

=== Final ===
25 October 2003; 20:05 (UTC–5)	Cuba	4 – 2	Panama	Estadio Latinoamericano, Havana
25 October 2003; 20:05 (UTC–5)		Boxscore		Estadio Latinoamericano, Havana

== Final standings ==
Pos	Team	W	L
Gold medal	Cuba	9	0
Silver medal	Panama	7	3
Bronze medal	Japan	9	1
4	Chinese Taipei	4	5
5	United States	7	2
6	Nicaragua	5	4
7	Brazil	5	5
8	South Korea	3	6
9	Netherlands	3	3
10	Canada	3	3
11	Mexico	2	5
12	Italy	1	5
13	Russia	1	5
14	China	1	6
15	France	0	7

== Awards ==
Tournament Awards
Award	Player
MVP	(Japan) Takashi Yoshiura
Leading hitter	(Cuba) Michel Enríquez
Pitcher with best ERA	(Cuba) Vicyohandri Odelín
Pitcher with best win/loss average	(Brazil) Kléber Ojima
Most Runs batted in	(Japan) Takashi Yoshiura
Most Home runs	(Japan) Takashi Yoshiura
Most Stolen bases	(Cuba) Eduardo Paret
Most Runs scored	(Panama) Omar Moreno
Outstanding defensive player	(Cuba) Eduardo Paret

All Star Team
Position	Player
Pitchers	(United States) John Cannon
Pitchers	(Brazil) Kléber Ojima
Catcher	(South Korea) Choi Ki-moon
First base	(Netherlands) Sharnol Adriana
Second base	(Japan) Daisuke Kusano
Third base	(Cuba) Michel Enríquez
Shortstop	(Cuba) Eduardo Paret
Outfield	(Japan) Takashi Yoshiura
Outfield	(Cuba) Frederich Cepeda
Outfield	(Panama) Rubén Rivera
Designated hitter	(Panama) Audes de León
