= Moncada =

Moncada can refer to:

== Places ==
- Moncada, Tarlac, a municipality (3rd class) in the Philippines
- Moncada, Valencia, a municipality in Spain
  - Moncada, a community of Santiago de Cuba
  - Moncada Barracks, named after Guillermon, notably attacked in 1953 at the start of the Cuban Revolution
    - Moncada (novel) (Moncada, premier combat de Fidel Castro), a 1965 novel by Robert Merle
  - Estadio Guillermón Moncada, stadium named in his honour
- La Moncada, a small town in the municipality of Tarimoro, Guanajuato, Mexico
- Palazzo Moncada (Caltanissetta) in Caltanissetta, Sicily

== People ==
- Denis Rolando Moncada Colindres, Nicaraguan foreign minister
- Eduardo Hernández Moncada (1899–1995), Mexican composer, pianist, and conductor
- Freddy Moncada (born 1973), Colombian road cyclist
- Gerardo Moncada (cyclist) (born 1962), Colombian road cyclist
- Gerardo Moncada (footballer) (born 1949), Colombian footballer
- Guillermon Moncada, a Cuban general and folkhero
- Jesús Moncada (1941–2005), writer in Catalan
- José María Moncada, (1870–1945), President of Nicaragua
- Rixi Moncada (born 1962), Honduran politician
- Salvador Moncada (born 1944), Honduran scientist
- Samuel Moncada, Venezuelan historian and Minister of Foreign Affairs
- Yoan Moncada (born 1995), Cuban baseball player
- House of Moncada, noble medieval family originating in Catalonia
