= Gifu Memorial Center =

Sports facilities in Gifu, Japan

Coordinates: 35°26′29″N 136°45′50″E

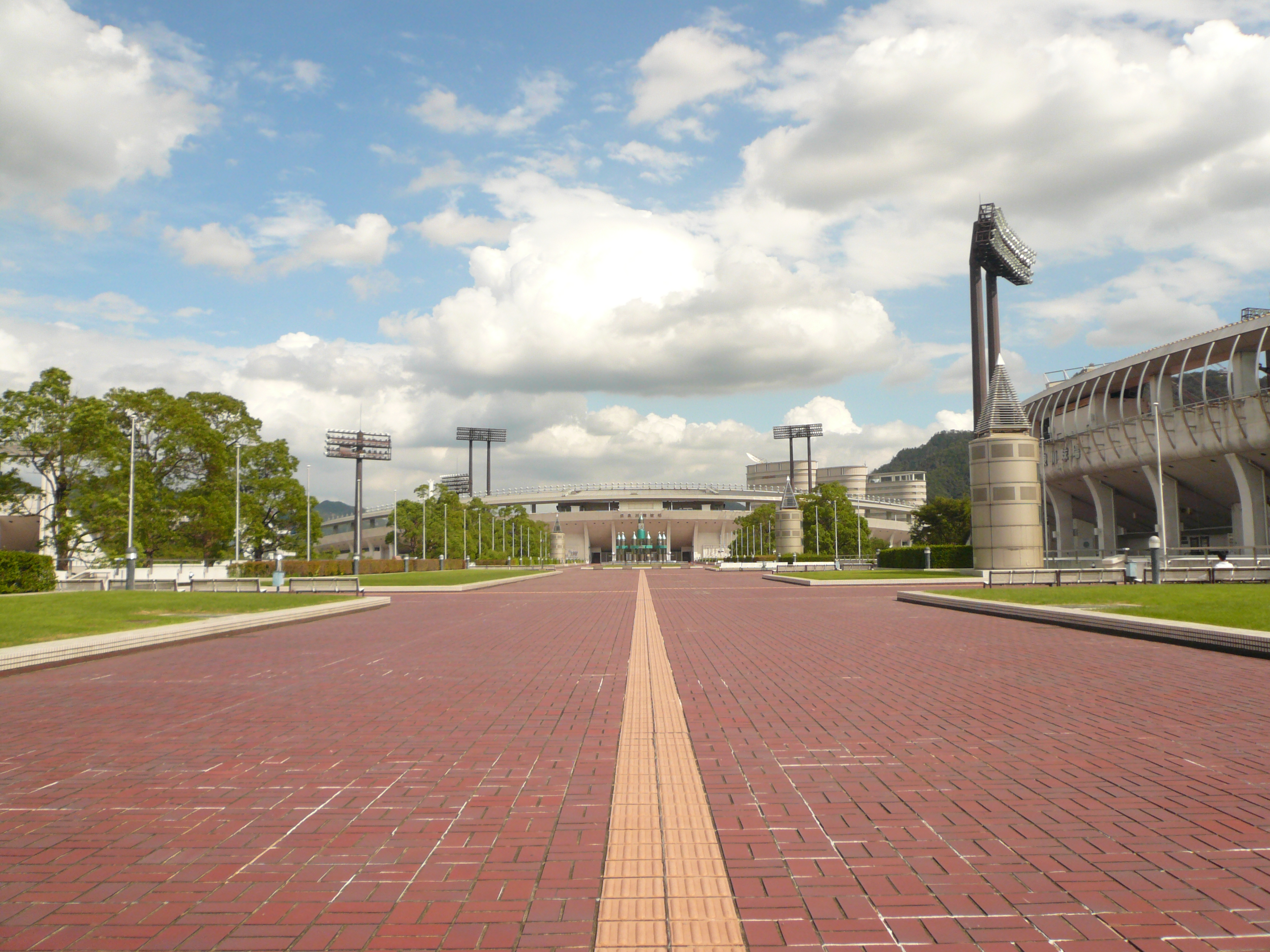
The Memorial Center's San San Deck

The Gifu Memorial Center (岐阜メモリアルセンター, Gifu Memoriaru Sentā) is a collection of sports facilities located in Gifu, Gifu Prefecture, Japan. It is a prefectural facility and its purpose is to promote sports and other events within the prefecture.

Along with the Nagaragawa Convention Center, the Nagaragawa Sports Plaza and Mirai Hall, it is part of the World Event and Convention Complex Gifu.

== History ==
The Memorial Center is an athletic park run by Gifu Prefecture and is located on the north bank of the Nagara River. Its site was originally developed for the National Sports Festival that was held in Gifu in 1965. The site also includes the Gifu Prefectural Baseball Stadium and, only a few hundred meters from there, the former location of the Gifu Correctional Facility. When the correctional facility was moved to a different location, it was decided that the facilities should be converted to help promote sports in the area. The site was then used to host the Gifu Future Watch '88 Exposition, before full construction of the present-day Memorial Center began. In 1990, construction began on the track and field facilities, which was soon followed by other sport-specific facilities.

== Major facilities ==
Many of the Memorial Centers facilities are connected by the San San Deck (サンサンデッキ San San Dekki), a raised pedestrian walkway that runs through the center of the complex. Some other buildings that are connected by the deck include the Management Building (本館 Honkan), which houses staff offices, training rooms and a gymnasium; as well as the city-supported Green Space (芝生広場 Shibafu Hiroba). To the north of the complex is the Youth Play Area (幼児児童広場 Yōji Jidō Hiroba), which includes a replica of a dinosaur skeleton.

=== Multipurpose facilities ===
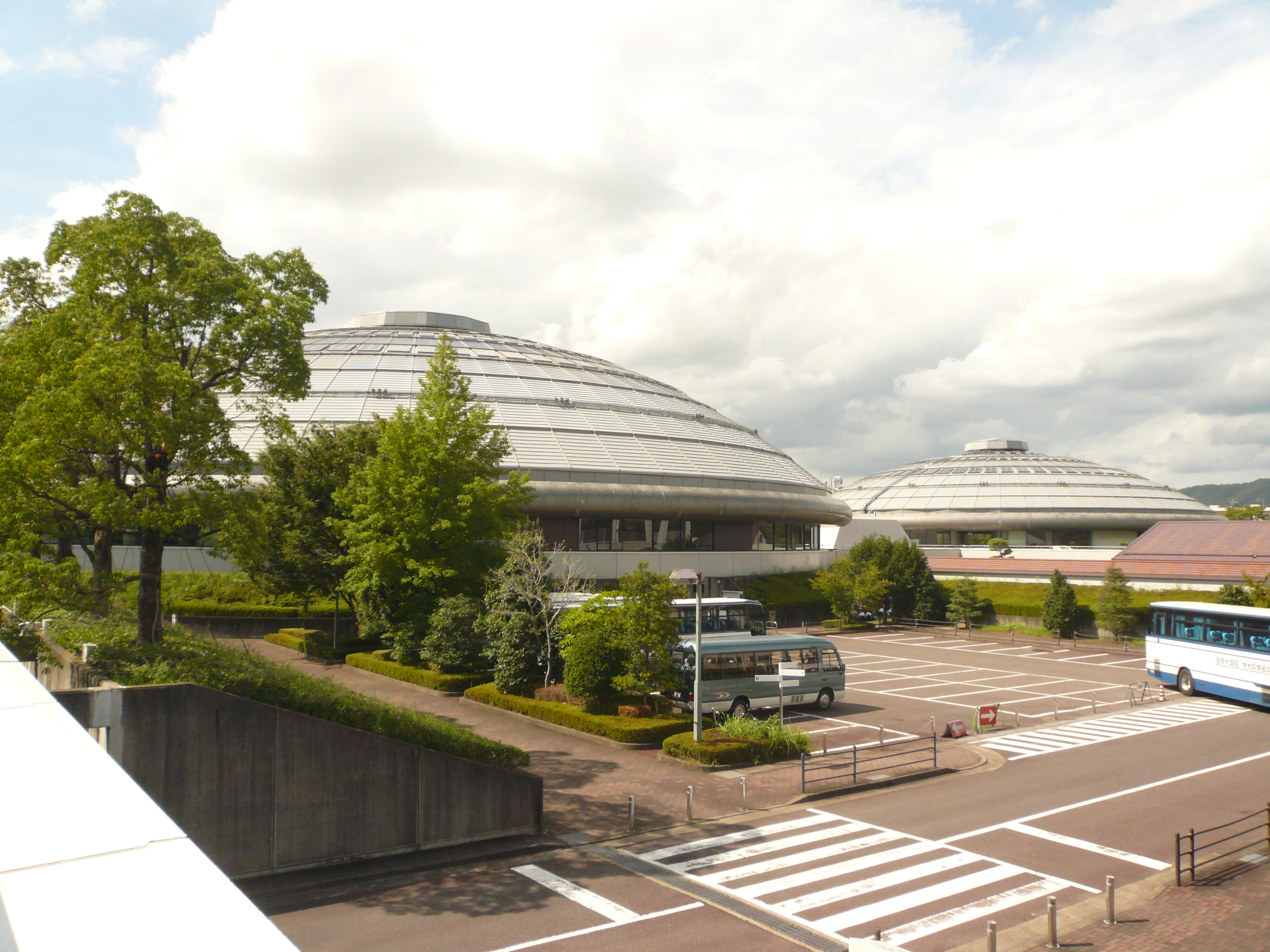
Deai Dome and Fureai Dome

The most recognizable features of the Memorial Center are its two domes, the larger Deai Dome (で愛ドーム Deai Dōmu) and the smaller Fureai Dome (ふれ愛ドーム Fureai Dōmu). Though the Deai Dome's capacity (4,500 people) is much larger than the Fureai Dome's (600 people), both facilities are able to accommodate international and nationwide sports competitions and events. They can play host to basketball, volleyball, table tennis, indoor tennis, gymnastics, in addition to other indoor sports. The domes can also be used for meetings, ceremonies and exhibitions.

=== Modern sports ===
The Nagaragawa Stadium (長良川競技場 Nagaragawa Kyōgi-jō) has an eight-lane, 400-meter outdoor track that surrounds a natural grass field. Since 1992, the track has served as the start and finish line for the All Japan Businesswomen Ekiden, in addition to various other track events. The inner pitch can be used for rugby, soccer and field hockey. Until 2001, it served as the home pitch for the Nagoya Grampus Eight and, currently, it is used as the home pitch for F.C. Gifu, which entered the J. League in 2008. This track and field is supported by the smaller Supplemental Athletic Field (補助競技場 Hojo Kyōgi-jō) just beside it. The supplemental field has a six-lane, 300-meter track that is often used for warm ups and practices. The Nagaragawa Ball Field (長良川球技メドウ Nagaragawa Kyūjō Medō) also serves as host for various field sports.

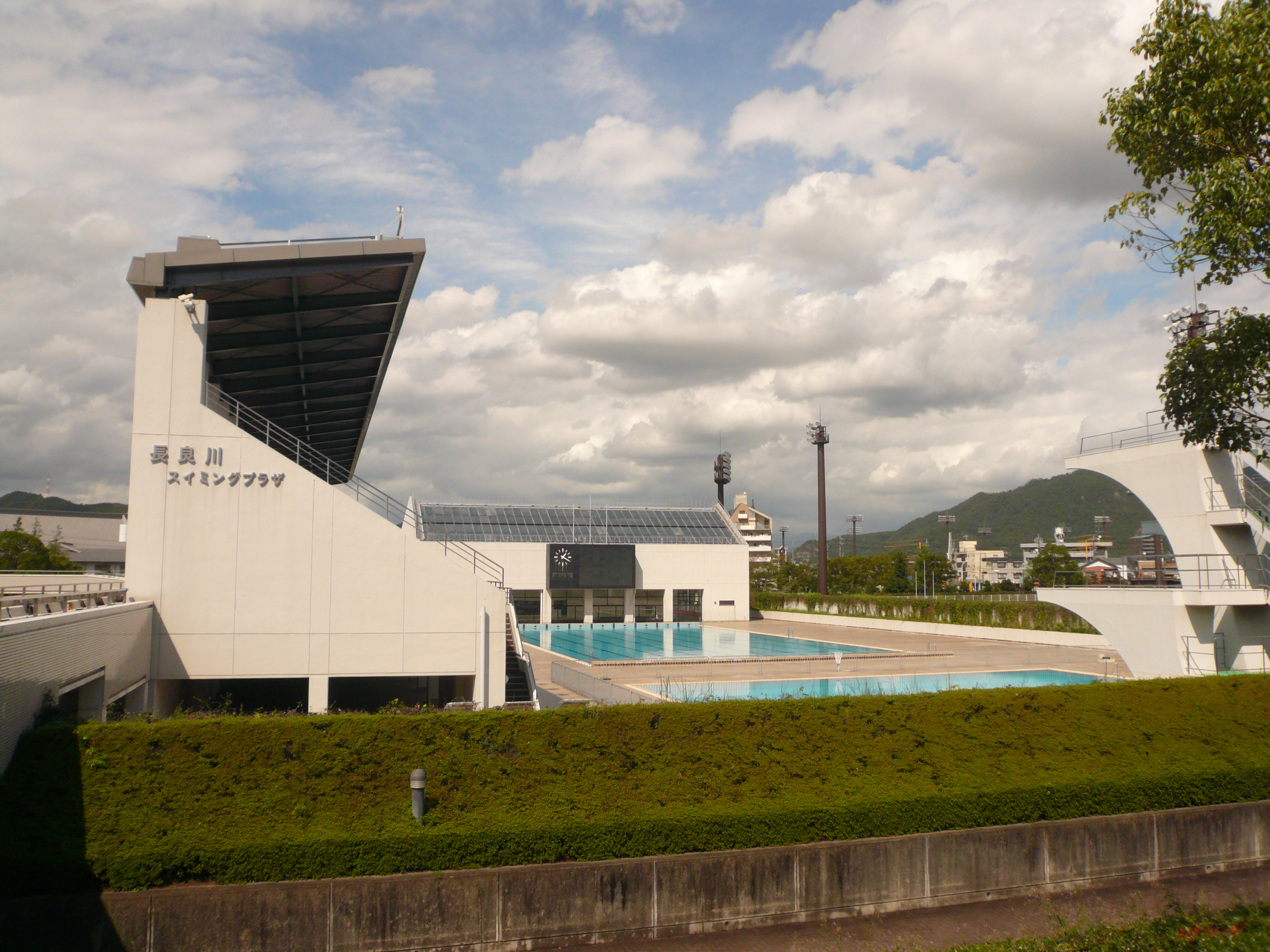
Swimming Plaza

The Nagaragawa Baseball Stadium (長良川球場 Nagaragawa Kyūjō) was originally opened in 1964 as the Gifu Prefectural Baseball Stadium in preparation for the 1965 sports festival. It was eventually closed, but was reopened on April 1, 1991, when it began hosting high school, amateur, corporate and professional teams. Each year, the Chunichi Dragons play host at the stadium for one game. The stadium has a capacity for approximately 30,000 spectators.

Other sports facilities include the Nagaragawa Swimming Plaza (長良川スイミングプラザ Nagaragawa Suimingu Puraza) and the Nagaragawa Tennis Plaza (長良川テニスプラザ Nagaragawa Tenisu Puraza). The swimming plaza consists of a 50-meter, nine-lane outdoor pool and a 25-meter, seven-lane indoor pool, as well as an outdoor pool for synchronized swimming. The tennis plaza holds one center court, in addition to 16 other courts, all of which are clay or artificial grass. Both of these plazas are open to the general public, though they are occasionally closed for both amateur and professional tournaments.

=== Traditional sports ===
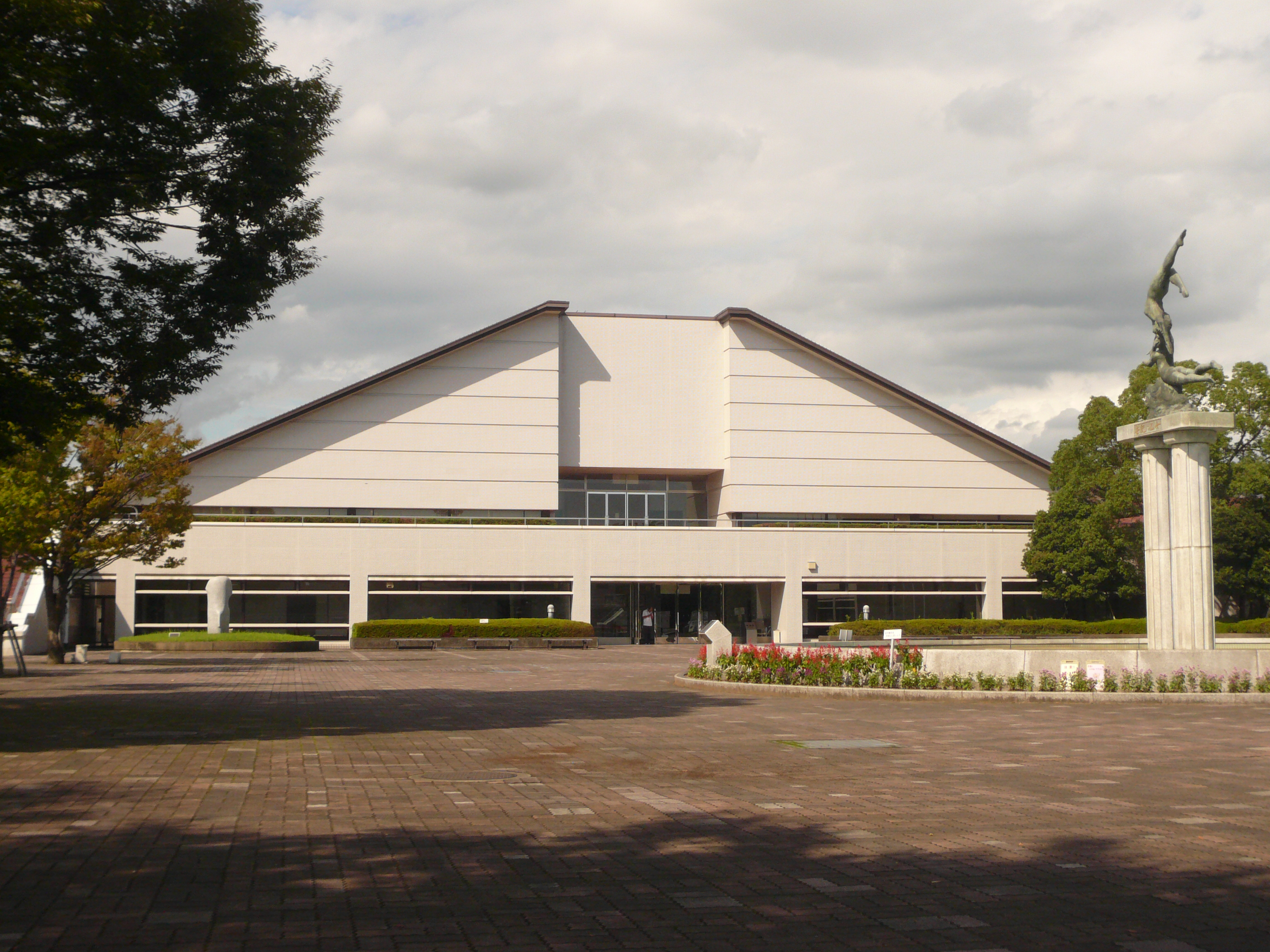
Martial Arts Gymnasium

In addition to supporting modern sports, the Memorial Center also has facilities for Japan's traditional sports. The Martial Arts Building (武道館 Budōkan) was created for participants in judo and kendo. The Sumo Grounds (相撲場 Sumō-jō) only offer one ring in which sumo wrestlers can face off, but provides seating for over 150 viewers. Also, the Nagaragawa Kyūdō Grounds (長良川弓道場 Nagaragawa Kyūdō-jō) allows up to six participants to compete in kyūdō competitions.

== Access ==
- From JR Gifu Station (Bus Platform 10) or Meitetsu Gifu Station (Bus Platform 5), board a bus on the Mitahora-danchi Line. Get off the bus at "Gifu Memoriaru Sentā, Seimon-mae" or "Gifu Memoriaru Sentā-mae." It takes approximately 17 minutes.
- From JR Gifu Station (Bus Platform 9), board a bus on the Nagara Iryō Line. Get off the bus at "Gifu Memoriaru Sentā-mae." It takes approximately 20 minutes.
