= Luís Manuel Pérez Rodriguez =

Cuban chess grandmaster (born 1978)

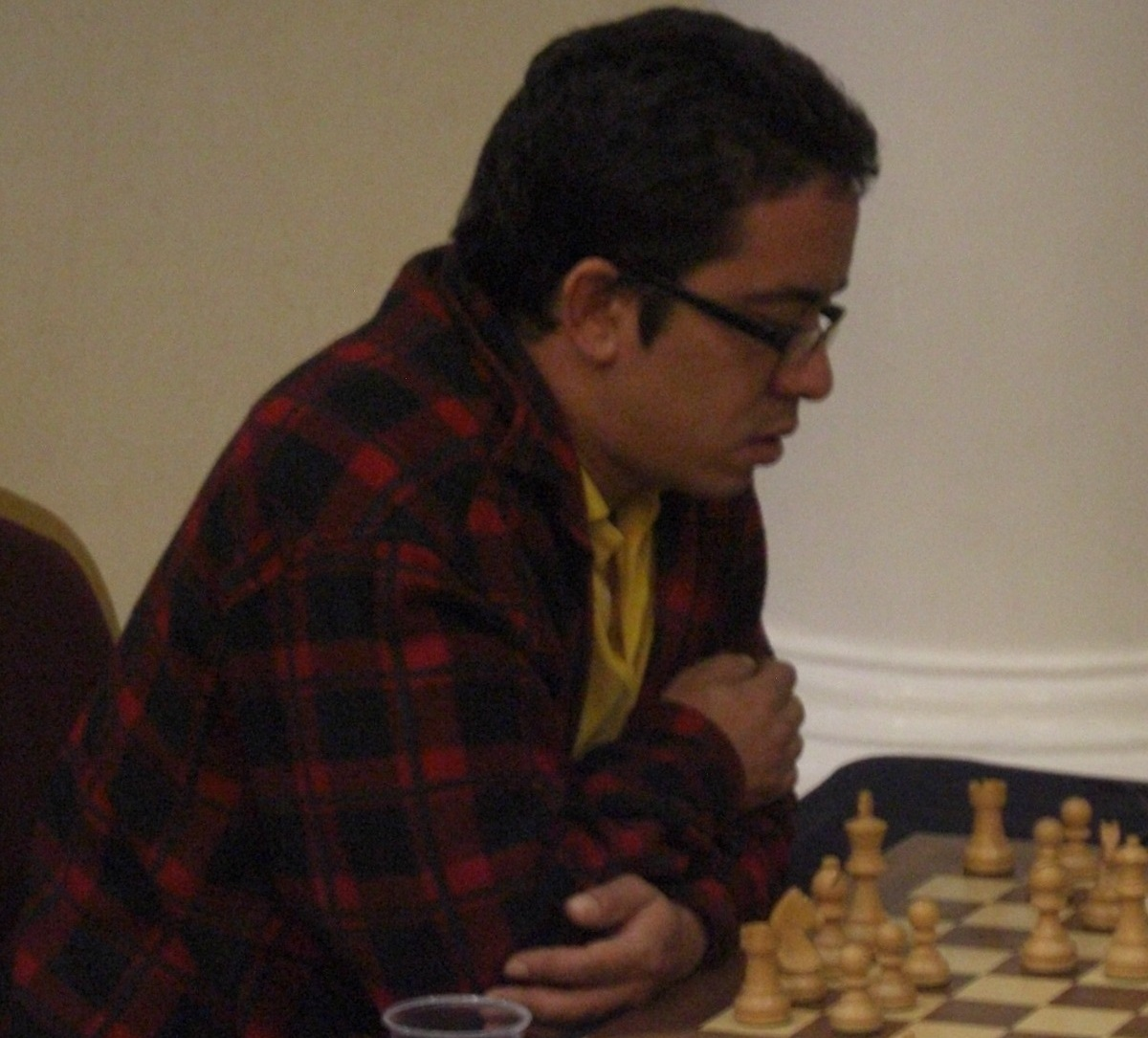
- Pérez Rodriguez in 2011

Personal information
- Born: October 5, 1978 (age 47) Holguín, Cuba

Chess career
- Country: Cuba
- Title: Grandmaster (2008)
- Peak rating: 2521 (October 2008)

Luís Manuel Pérez Rodriguez is a Cuban chess grandmaster.

== Chess career ==
He became a Grandmaster in 2008, after achieving his norms at the:

- Capablanca Group Premier in May 1999
- Villa de Marin International Open in July 2003
- Cuban National in January 2008

In October 2019, he played in the Canadian International Open Championship, where he tied for 6th-11th place.

In February 2024, he played for the Holguin Club in the Absolute Chess Tournament. He finished 19th out of a field of 26, and finished second of his club members.
