= Riccardo De Santis =

Italian baseball player (born 1980)

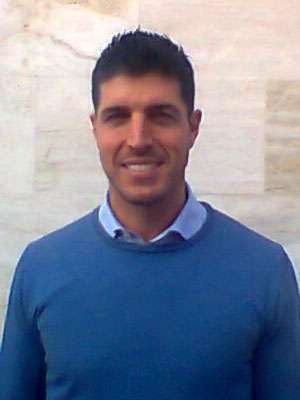

Fortitudo Baseball Bologna
- Pitcher
- Born: January 4, 1980 (age 46); Grosseto

IBL debut
- 1997, for the Bbc Grosseto
- Stats at Baseball Reference

Teams
- Bbc Grosseto (1997–2011); Nettuno Baseball Club (2012–2013); Fortitudo Baseball Bologna (2014–2016 )

Riccardo De Santis (born 4 January 1980) is an Italian baseball player who competed in the 2004 Summer Olympics.

De Santis participated in the 2003 Baseball World Cup in Cuba. He appeared in two games, pitching 5.2 innings with a 9.53 ERA, recording one loss against Nicaragua.

As a member of Italy national baseball team he won 2010 European Baseball Championship.
