= William Lucena =

Venezuelan-born Italian baseball player

William Enrique Lucena Amato (born October 1, 1981) is a former Venezuelan-born Italian baseball right-handed pitcher who competed in the 2004 Summer Olympics. He was born in Maracaibo, Zulia.

In between, Lucena pitched for the Comcor Modena and T & A San Marino clubs of the Italian Baseball League in a span of nine seasons from 2000–2008.

Besides, he also pitched for the Italian national team in the 2002 Intercontinental Cup, 2003 Baseball World Cup, 2003 European Baseball Championship, and 2008 European Cup.
