= Nagaragawa Convention Center =

Convention center in the city of Gifu, Japan

Nagaragawa Convention Center 長良川国際会議場
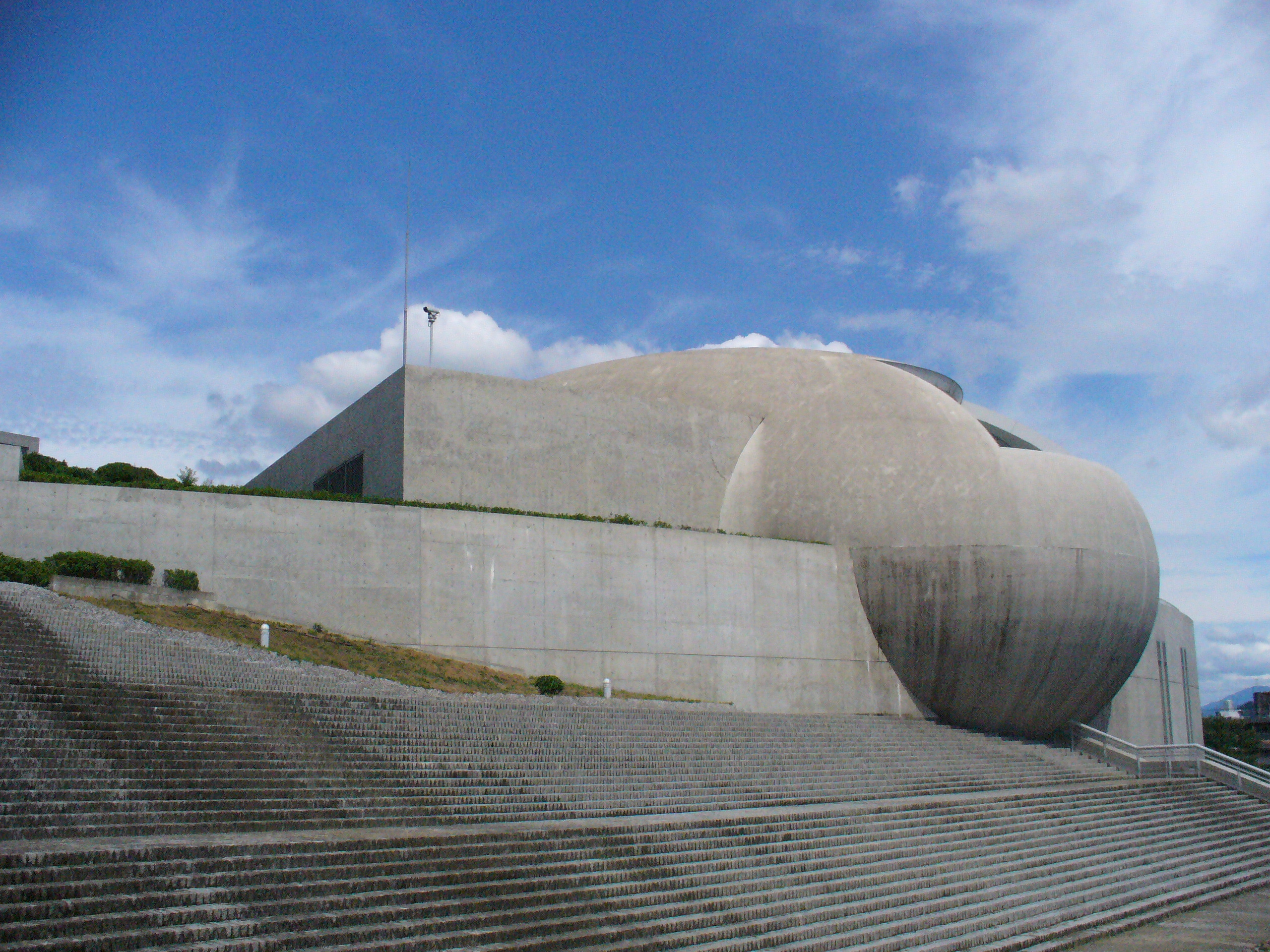
- The Nagaragawa Convention Center
- Interactive map of Nagaragawa Convention Center 長良川国際会議場
- Location: 2695-2 Nagara Fukumitsu; Gifu, Gifu Prefecture; Japan 〒502-0817
- Coordinates: 35.44121°N 136.768558°E
- Owner: Gifu
- Capacity: 1,689
- Type: Convention center

Construction
- Built: 1995
- Opened: September 1, 1995

Website
- Homepage (in Japanese)

The Nagaragawa Convention Center (長良川国際会議場, Nagaragawa Kokusai Kaigijō) is a multi-purpose convention center in the city of Gifu, Gifu Prefecture, Japan. The name literally translates to Nagara River International Convention Center, but the official English translation drops "international."

Along with the Gifu Memorial Center, the Nagaragawa Sports Plaza and Mirai Hall, it is part of the World Event and Convention Complex Gifu.

== Construction ==
The convention center was built to promote Gifu as a good location for large conventions and has many enticements to attract both domestic and international groups to hold events in the city. The famed architect Tadao Ando designed the structure, giving it a unique, egg-shaped look from the outside, making it immediately recognizable.

It opened on September 1, 1995, and is managed by the city's Public Hall Management Group.

== Facilities ==
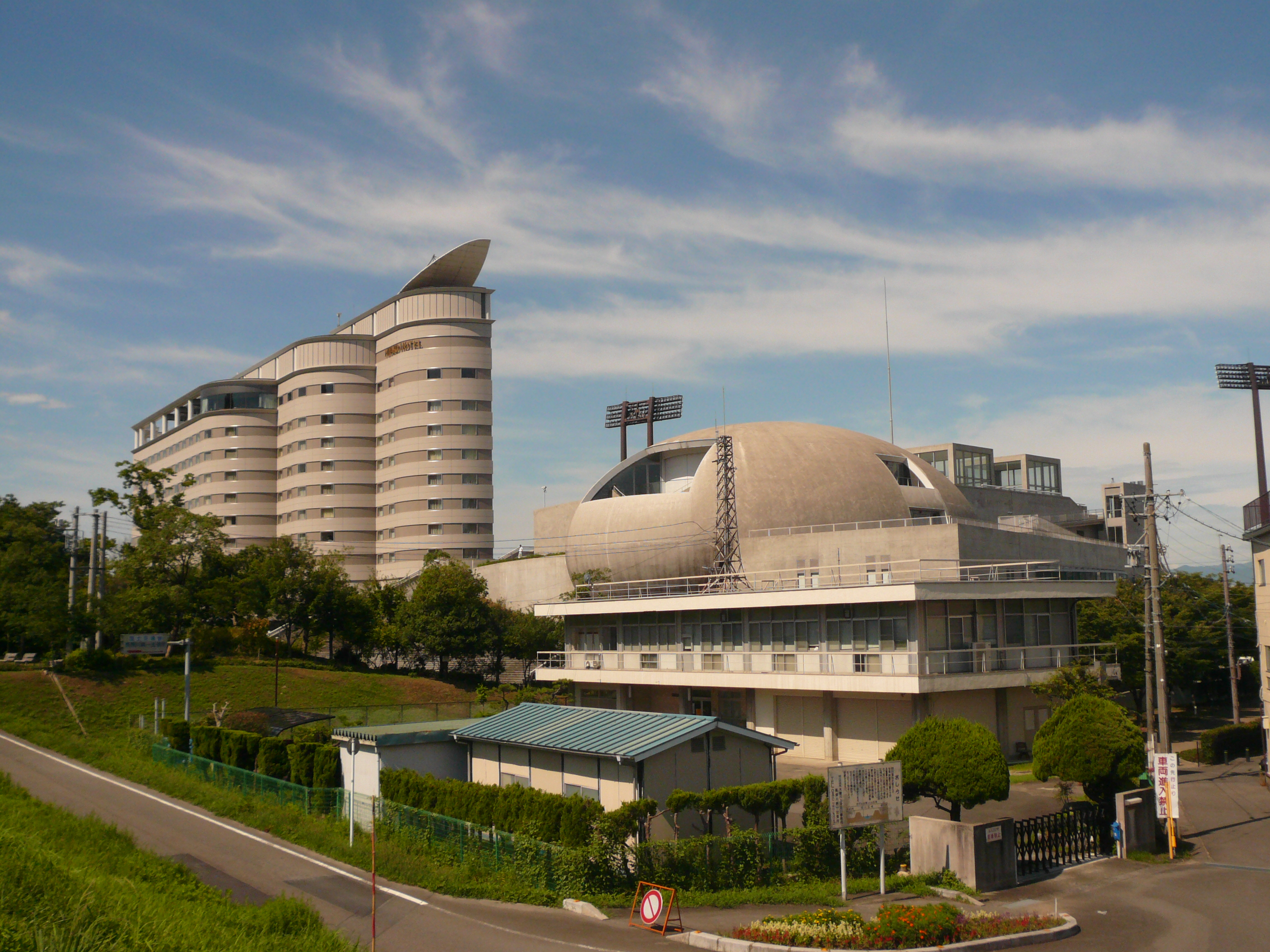
The convention center with the Gifu Miyako Hotel in the background

The main hall of the convention center is the largest in all of Gifu Prefecture. It is mainly used for concerts and as a central location for conventions. With an area near 1,206 m^{2} (12,981 ft^{2}), it seats 1,689 people, but the floors and walls are adjustable, offering many difference configurations. It was named one of Japan's Top 100 Venues for musical performances.

There is also an international conference room located in the dome portion of the egg-like structure. A portion of the wall can open up to a view of the Nagara River, Mount Kinka and Gifu Castle. The room is suitable for mid-sized international conventions and can provide simultaneous interpretations in six languages. There are also small, medium and large meeting rooms available for more private meetings.

The total floor space for the main hall and the eight other rooms is 2,332 m^{2} (25,101 ft^{2}), allowing seating for over 2,400 people.

== Access ==
Gifu Bus provides public transportation from both JR Gifu Station and Meitetsu Gifu Station downtown. Riders can get off at either the "Nagaragawa Kokusai Kaigijō Kitaguchi" or the "Nagaragawa Kokusai Kaigijō-mae" bus stop.
