= Estadio Latinoamericano =

Stadium in Havana, Cuba

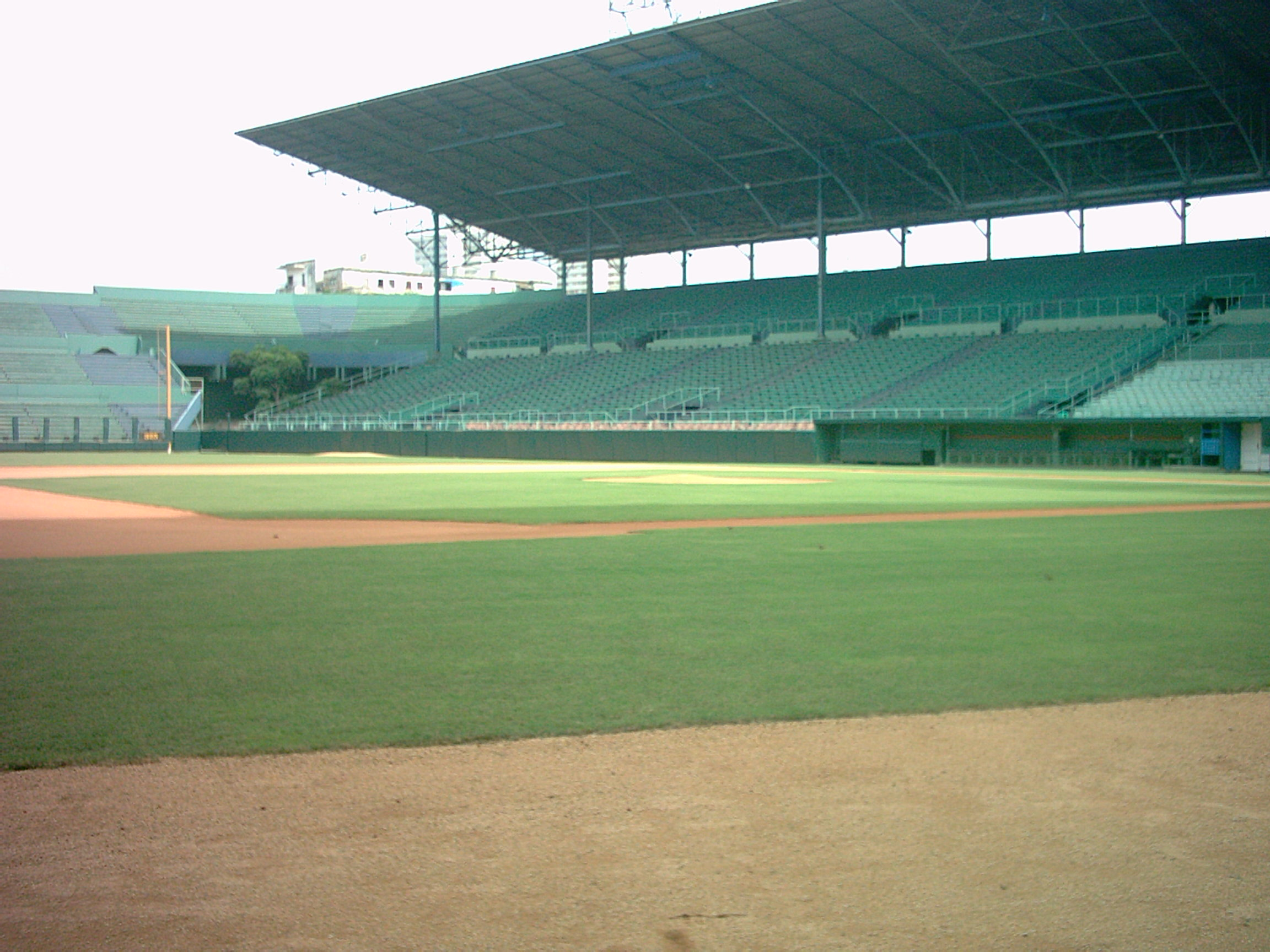
- Interactive map of Estadio Latinoamericano
- Former names: Gran Estadio de La Habana (1946-1961); Estadio del Cerro
- Location: Havana, Cuba
- Coordinates: 23°7′6″N 82°22′34″W
- Owner: Government of Cuba
- Capacity: 31,000 (1946–1971); 55,000 (1971 to present)
- Surface: Grass
- Field size: Left - 325 ft. (99 m) Left Center - 345 ft. (105 m); Center - 400 ft. (122 m); Right Center - 345 ft. (105 m) Right - 325 ft. (99 m)

Construction
- Opened: October 26, 1946

Tenants
- Cuban National Series; Industriales (1961-present); Metropolitanos (1974-2012); Minor League Baseball; Havana Sugar Kings (IL) (1954-1960); MLB Spring Training; Pittsburgh Pirates (NL) (1953); Brooklyn Dodgers (NL) (1947)

The Estadio Latinoamericano (English: Latin American Stadium) is a stadium in Havana, Cuba. It is primarily used for baseball, and is the second largest baseball stadium in the world by capacity. The stadium, a spacious pitchers' park with prevailing winds blowing in and a playing surface and lighting system of major-league quality, was built in 1946 as the top baseball park in Latin America.

The stadium opened with the name Gran Estadio de La Habana, known to English-language sportswriters as Gran Stadium, surpassing La Tropical Stadium as the largest stadium in Havana. It was also referred to as the Estadio del Cerro, or more popularly, "The Colossus of Cerro" (Spanish: El Coloso del Cerro), due to its location in the Cerro neighborhood.

The Latinoamericano holds about 55,000 people. In 1999, it hosted an exhibition series between the Cuba national team and the Baltimore Orioles.

== History ==
The stadium debuted on October 26, 1946, before a crowd of 31,000 fans for a clash between the Almendares and Cienfuegos baseball teams, the largest crowd that had attended a sports event in Cuba. Almendares won the game 9–1. The Venezuelan Alejandro Carrasquel, who played for the Washington Senators in the Major League, threw the first pitch of the game.

In its 70 years, the stadium has been utilised for diverse spectacles including popular dance performances and boxing matches.

In 1971, the stadium was renovated and expanded. Its stands were enlarged, increasing its capacity to 55,000 spectators, and its gardens were extended.

External videos
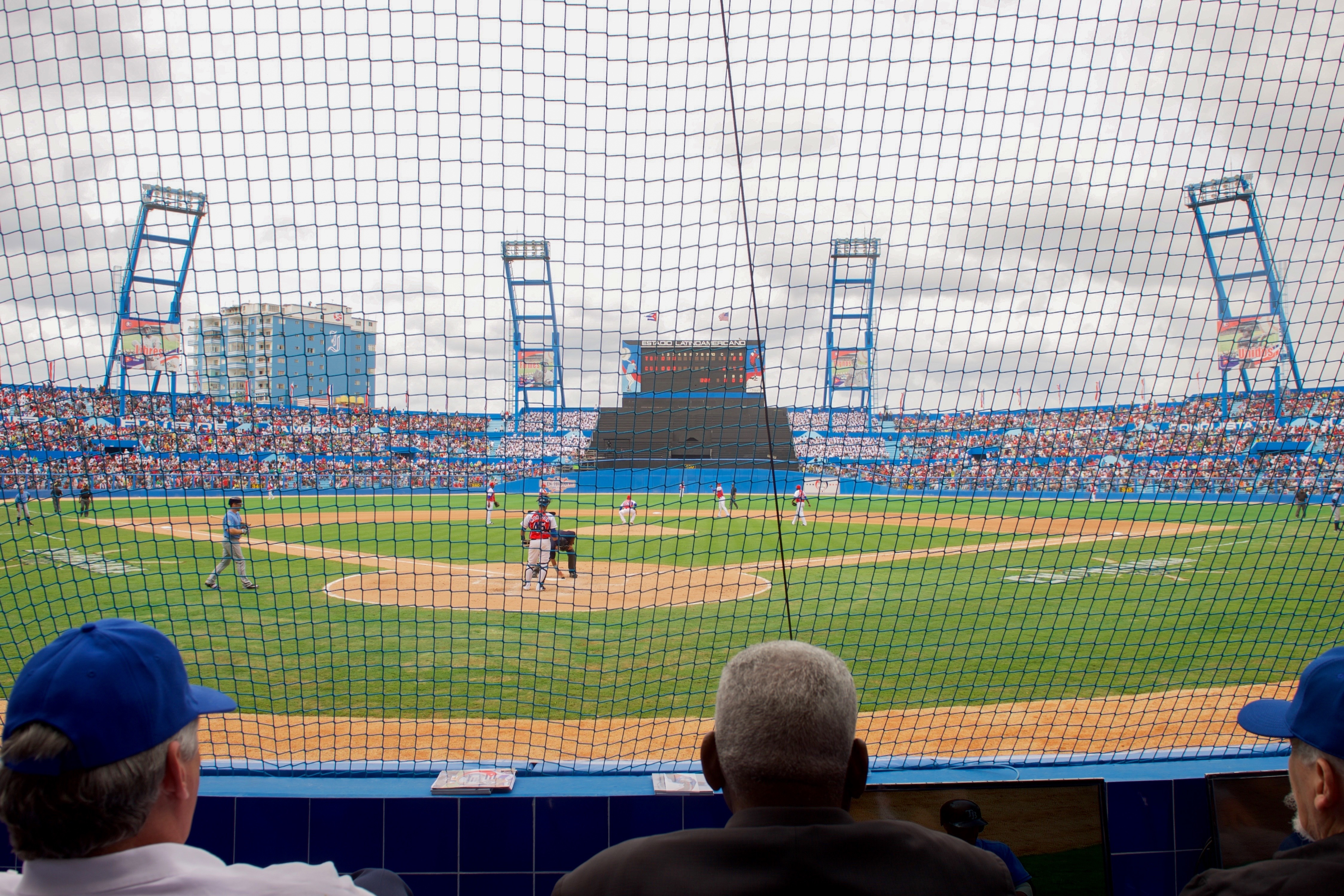
- The First Family Takes in a Baseball Game in Havana, Cuba, White House

On March 22, 2016, the Tampa Bay Rays faced the Cuba national baseball team in an exhibition game. This was attended by numerous dignitaries, including President of the United States Barack Obama and Raúl Castro. This game represented the thaw between the two countries that had occurred in recent years, and was broadcast live on ESPN. The Rays were selected after a lottery conducted by Major League Baseball. The Rays won 4–1.

The stadium has been used for political purposes. In 1956, it was the location of a student demonstration headed by José Antonio Echeverría, against the Government of Fulgencio Batista.

== See also ==
- Estadio Panamericano
- Estadio Pedro Marrero
