= Kiyohara Baseball Stadium =

Stadium in Utsunomiya, Tochigi Prefecture, Japan

Coordinates: 36°32′37.04″N 139°59′2.31″E

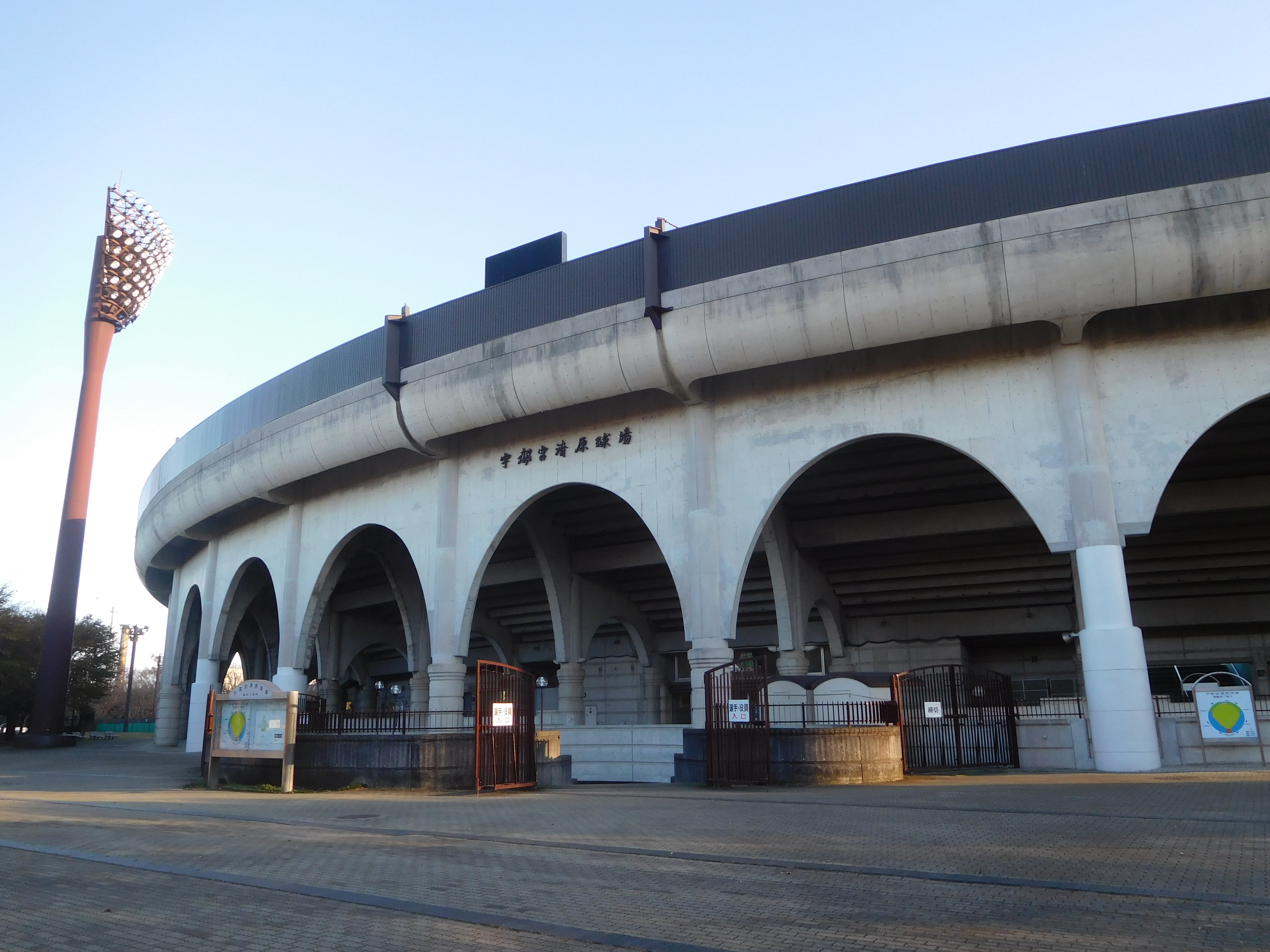
- Interactive map of Kiyohara Baseball Stadium
- Full name: Utsunomiya KIyohara Baseball Stadium
- Location: Utsunomiya, Tochigi, Japan
- Owner: Utsunomiya City
- Capacity: 30,000
- Field size: left – 97.6 m center - 122 m right – 97.6 m

Construction
- Opened: 1988

Kiyohara Baseball Stadium (宇都宮清原球場, Utsunomiya Kiyohara Kyūjō) is a multi-use stadium in Utsunomiya, Japan. It is currently used mostly for baseball games, and the stadium holds approximately 30,000 people.
