= Calixto García Íñiguez Stadium =

Stadium in Holguín, Cuba

Coordinates: 20°53′15″N 76°14′41″W

Estadio Calixto García Íñiguez
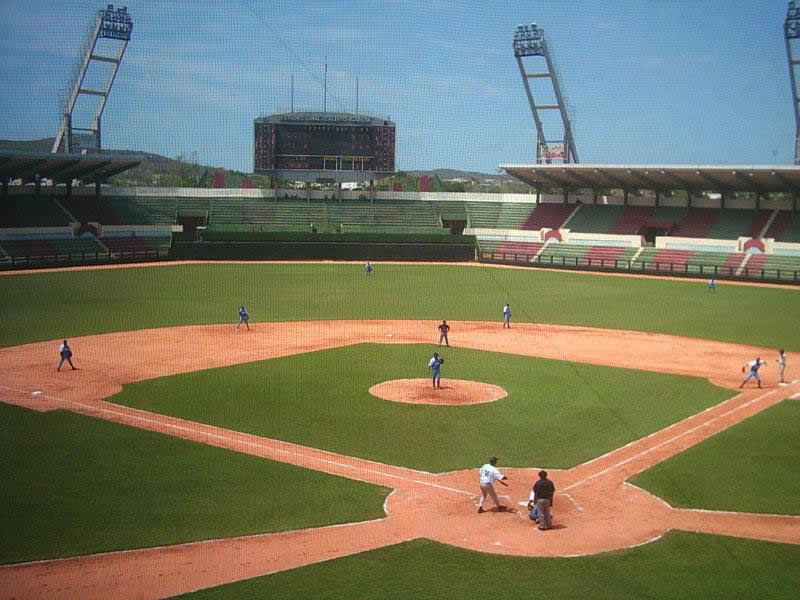
- Interactive map of Estadio Calixto García Íñiguez
- Full name: Estadio Mayor General Calixto García Iñiguez
- Location: Holguín, Holguín Province, Cuba
- Capacity: 30,000
- Field size: Left Field – 99.06 m (325 ft); Center Field – 121.92 m (400 ft); Right Field – 99.06 m (325 ft)

Construction
- Opened: 10 February 1979

Tenant
- Sabuesos de Holguín (Cuban National Series) (1979–present)

Estadio Calixto García Íñiguez is a multi-use stadium in Holguín, Cuba. It is currently used mostly for baseball games and is the home stadium of the Sabuesos de Holguín. The stadium holds 30,000 people.

The stadium is named after Cuban patriot Calixto García.

== History ==
The Estadio Calixto García Íñiguez was inaugurated on 10 February 1979 with a match between the local Holguín baseball team and the Villa Clara team.

The stadium hosted the 2003 Baseball World Cup.
