= Guillermo Moncada =

Cuban general (1841–1895)

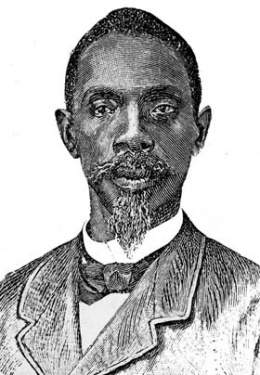
- Born: June 25, 1841; Santiago de Cuba, Cuba
- Died: April 5, 1895 (aged 53) Alto Songo, Santiago de Cuba, Cuba
- Allegiance: Cuba
- Branch: Army
- Rank: General officer
- Conflicts: Ten Years' War; Cuban War of Independence

Guillermo Moncada (June 25, 1841 – April 5, 1895), nicknamed "Guillermón" since his childhood (due to his large size), was one of 29 Cuban generals in the Cuban War of Independence.

Born in Santiago, Cuba, in 1841, he was a former carpenter who later became a black folk hero, renowned for ending the business of slavehunter Miguel Pérez Céspedes. His father, Narciso Veranes, was a freed slave and did not want his children have his name, so Guillermó took his mother's last name, Dominga Moncada.

He learnt to read and write when he was a child and later turned out to be a writer. He became a carpenter, a job with which he could earn money for his living.

== Activities in Revolution ==
Guillermo Moncada fought for the independence of Cuba. He became a notable black officer in three wars against Spain (1868–1878, 1879–1880, 1895–1898).

José Martí appointed him head of the easternmost province of the country during the preparation of the War of 1895. After giving the order for the uprising to this province, Guillermón moved to Alto Songo, where he rose at dawn on February 24.

The Moncada Barracks entered history again on July 26, 1953, when the Moncada Barracks was attacked by a group of revolutionaries led by Fidel Castro Ruz.

== Ten year war (1868–1878) ==
His comrades in the army called him Guillermón, for his stature and courage in battles The son of a very poor black family, he was among the first to join the insurgent ranks in 1868 and, thanks to his bravery, he rose to the rank of Brigade General of the Liberation Army.

Generalissimo Máximo Gómez said about him: "He has leadership skills and great strategic ability".

== Little war, prison in Spain and other actions ==
Despite being one of the protagonists of the events in Santiago, Cuba, on August 26, 1879, where the Little War began, he did not join until four days after it attacked the La Borgita sugar mill.

Calixto García, being president of the Cuban Revolutionary Committee, appointed him head of the forces of the center and south of the Oriente province, with the rank of Major General.

== Tribute ==
In his honor, the barracks where the No. 1 Regiment of Santiago de Cuba was located, was named after him.

== Death ==
Guillermo Moncada died in 1895 of tuberculosis in his camp in Joturito, Mucaral, municipality of Alto Songo, Santiago de Cuba, after spending years in harsh Spanish prisons.

The Moncada Barracks and Estadio Guillermón Moncada were both named in his honour.
