= Victoria de Girón Stadium =

Multi-use stadium in Matanzas, Cuba

Coordinates: 23°2′17″N 81°35′18″W

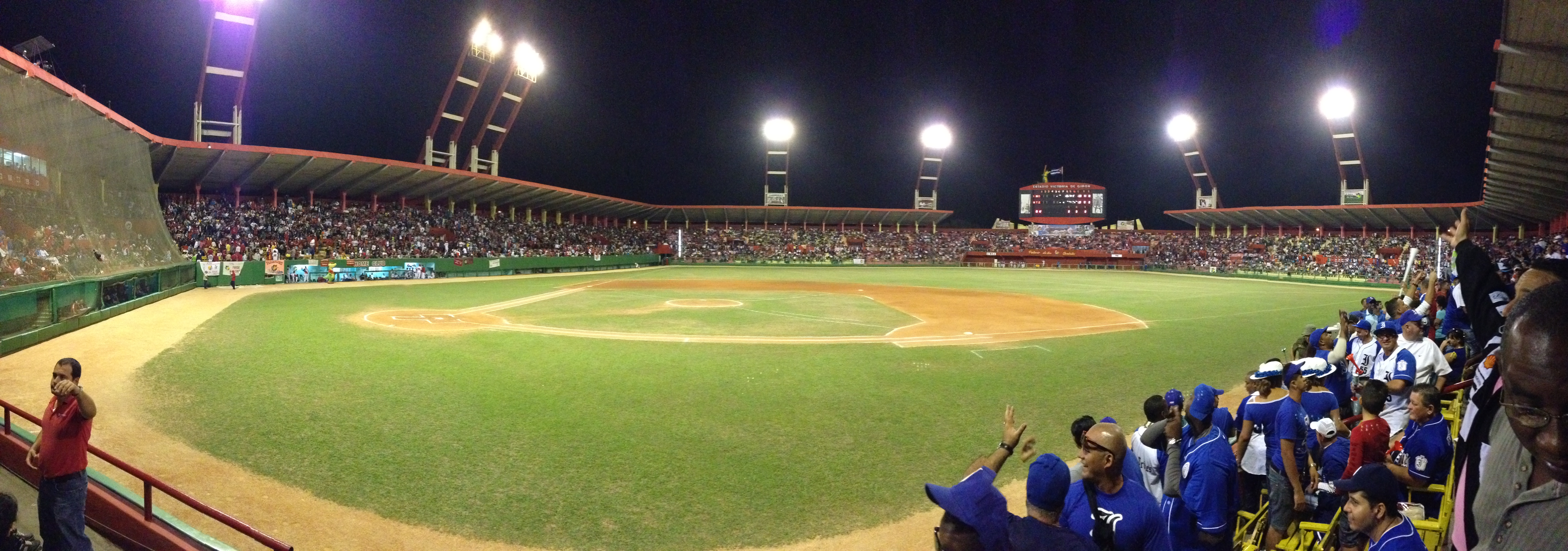
Panoramic View of Victoria de Giron Stadium, from the 1st-base line seats, Jan 2013

The Estadio Victoria de Girón is a multi-use stadium in Matanzas, Cuba. It is currently used mostly for baseball games and is the home stadium of Matanzas Cocodrilos. The stadium holds 22,000 and was built in 1977.
