= Gifu Prefectural Baseball Stadium =

Baseball stadium in Gifu, Japan

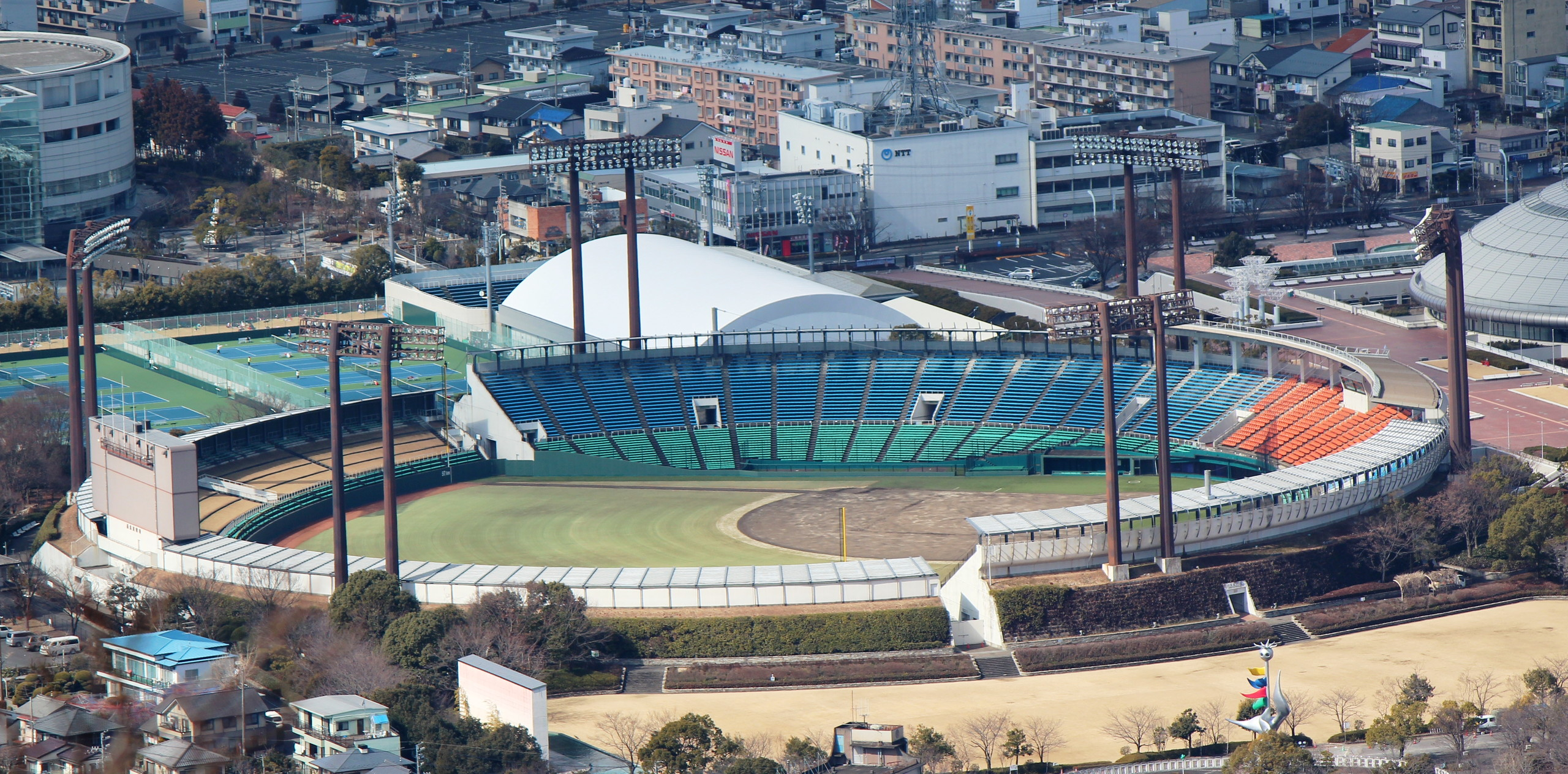
- Interactive map of Gifu Prefectural Baseball Stadium
- Location: Gifu, Japan
- Coordinates: 35.440376°N 136.762919°E
- Capacity: 22,030

Construction
- Opened: April 1, 1991

Gifu Prefectural Baseball Stadium is a multi-purpose stadium in Gifu, Japan. It is currently used mostly for baseball matches. The stadium was originally opened in 1930 and has a capacity of 22,030 spectators.
