= Holguín =

Holguin San Isidoro de Holguin
- Municipality
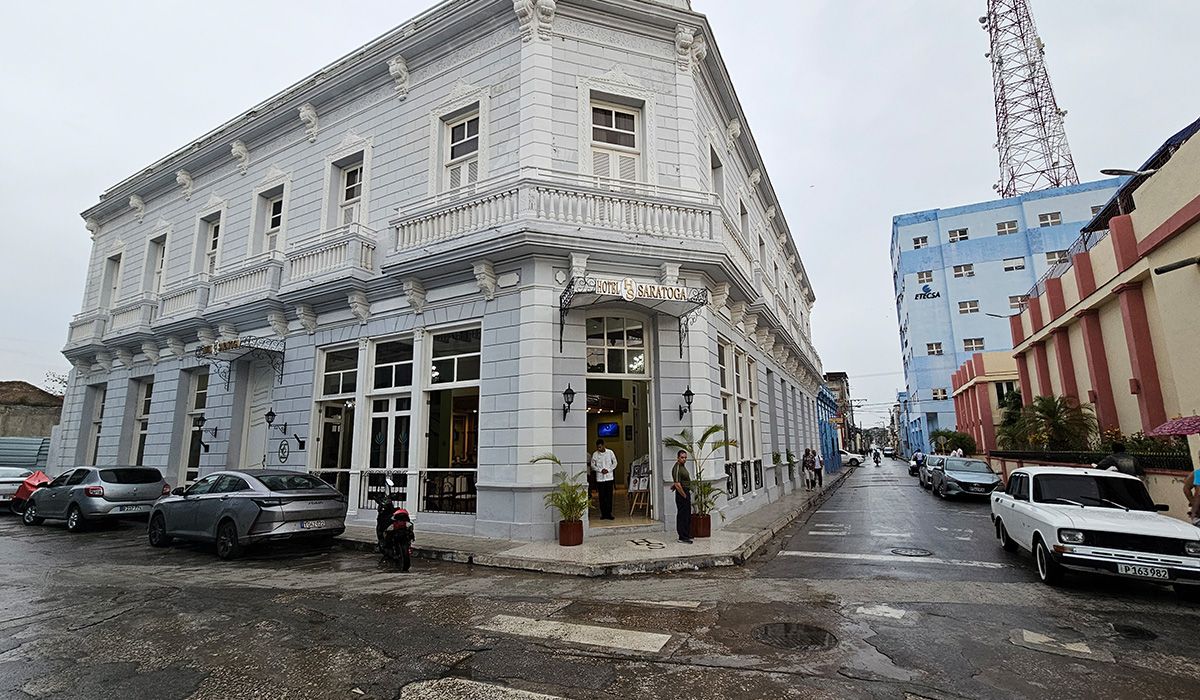
- Hotel Saratoga, Holguín

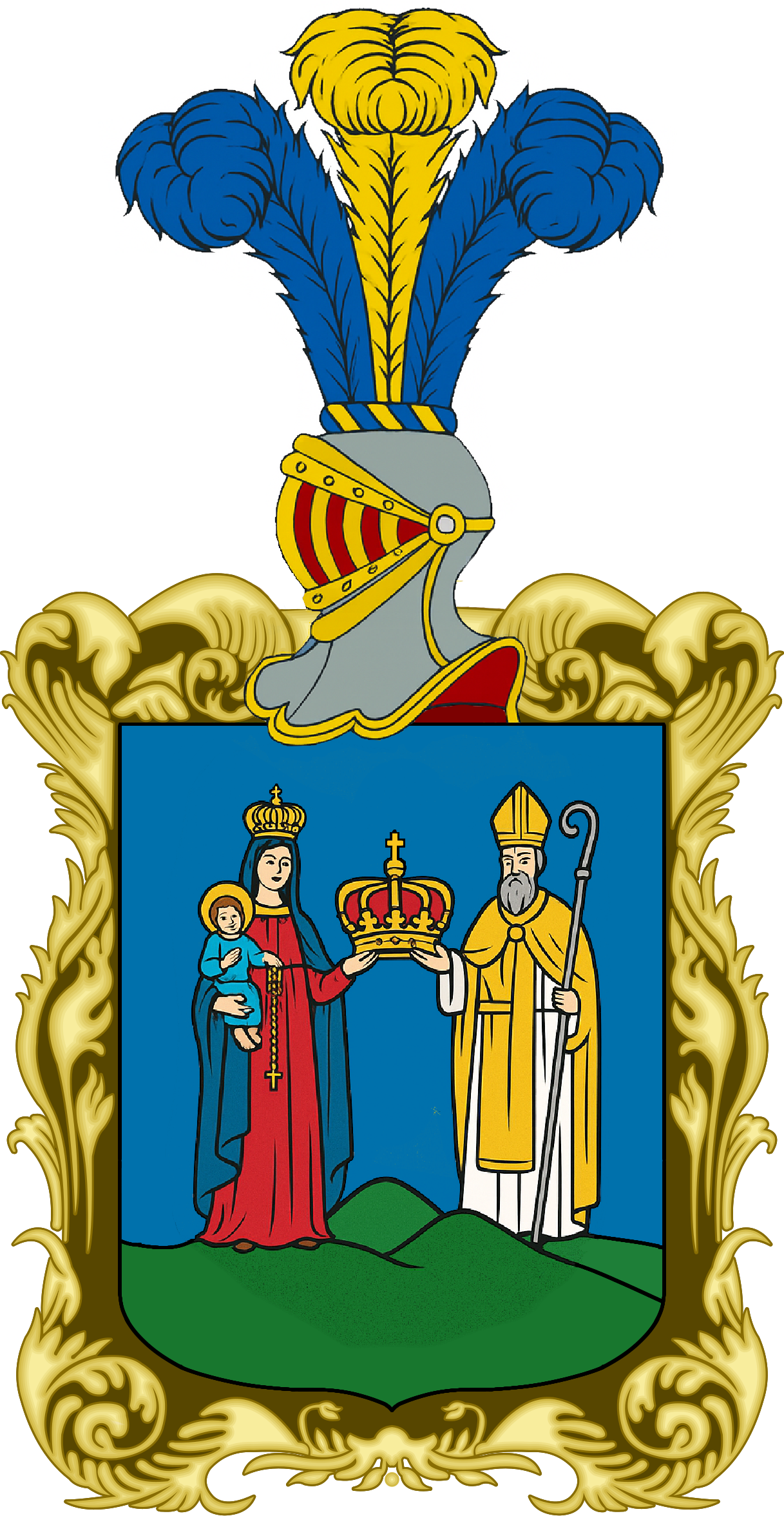
- Flag Coat of arms

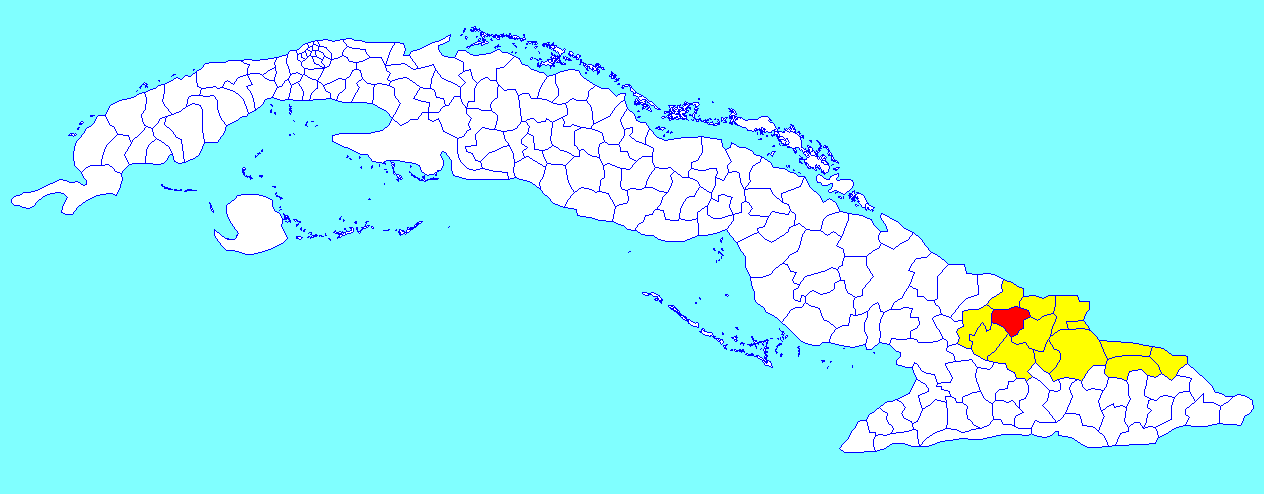
- Holguín municipality (red) within Holguín Province (yellow) and Cuba
- Coordinates: 20°53′13″N 76°15′33″W
- Country: Cuba
- Province: Holguín
- Metro Zone: Holguín Metro District
- Established: 1523

Government
  - President: Ricardo Antonio Suárez Martínez

Area
  - Municipality: 690 km^{2} (270 sq mi)
- Elevation: 5 m (16 ft)

Population (2022)
  - Municipality: 355,189
  - Rank: 4th
  - Density: 510/km^{2} (1,300/sq mi)
  - Urban: 309,615
  - Rural: 45,574
  - Metro: 1,006,834 (Province)
- Demonym(s): Holguinero,-a
- Time zone: UTC-5 (EST)
  - Summer (DST): UTC-4
- Postal code: 80100
- Area code: +53 24
- Vehicle registration: O

Holguín (/ɔːlˈɡiːn/; Spanish pronunciation: [olˈgin]) is a municipality-city in Cuba. It is the fourth largest city in Cuba, after Havana, Santiago de Cuba, and Camagüey.

== History ==
Before Columbus, the Taino people settled in huts made from royal palm in the Holguin area later urbanized by the Spanish; their artifacts are shown at the local Holguin La Periquera museum. The settlement was founded in 1523 on land donated by Diego Velázquez de Cuéllar to Captain Francisco García Holguín, a Spanish military officer. Holguin added his maternal surname to the name of the town, giving it the name San Isidoro de Holguín. Prior to 1976, Holguín was located in the province of Oriente. Before Pope Francis's visit to the United States, in September 2015, he visited Cuba, and one of his stops was at the Diocese of Holguín to, among other things, commemorate the location where Christopher Columbus landed.

== Geography ==
The municipality is divided into repartos or barrios. The old municipality was more extense, and in 1940 included: Aguarás, Aguas Claras, Alcalá, Arroyo Blanco del Sur, Báguanos, Cabezuelas, Cacocum, Calderón, Camazán, Cauto del Cristo, Corralillo, Cruces de Purnio, Damián, Floro Pérez, Gibara, Guabasiabo, Guayabal, Guirabo, Haticos del Purial, La Aguada, La Cuaba, La Palma, La Rioja, Las Calabazas, Managuaco, Melones, Norte, Omaja, Purnio, San Agustín, San Andrés, San Francisco, San Juan, San Lorenzo, Santa Rita, Sur, Tacámara, Tasajeras, Uñas, Uñitas, Velasco, Yareyal and Yayal.

At present time, some of the above are part of other municipalities, but the following still belong to Holguín: Aguas Claras, Guirabo, La Cuaba, Las Calabazas, Purnio, San Andrés, Yareyal.

== Economy ==
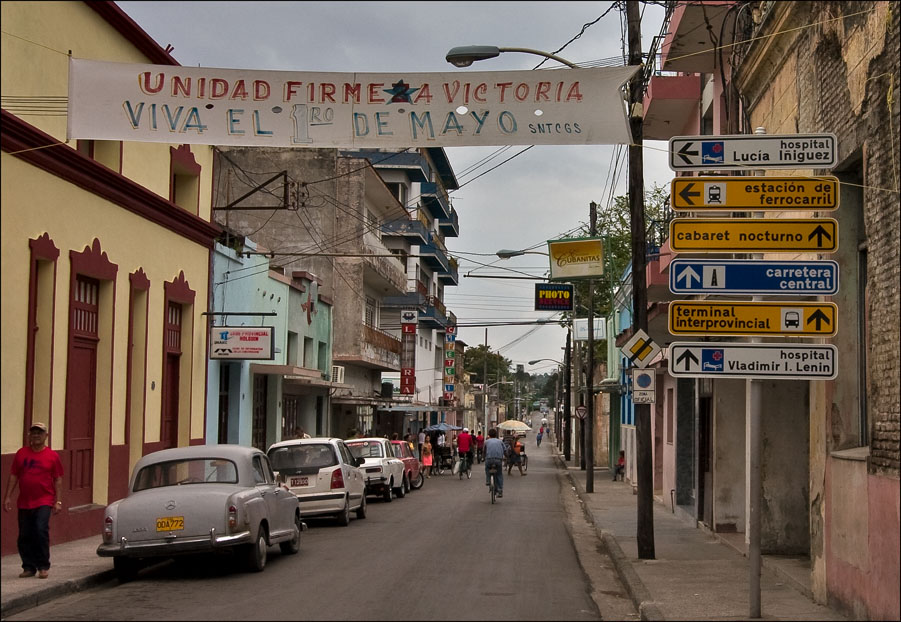
Frexes Street in Holguin

== Demographics ==
In 2004, the municipality of Holguín had a population of 326,740. With a total area of 658 km^{2} (254 sq mi), it had a population density of 497/km^{2} (1,290/sq mi). By 2012, the population had increased slightly to 346,195 for a population density of 520/km^{2} (1,300/sq mi).

== Infrastructure ==
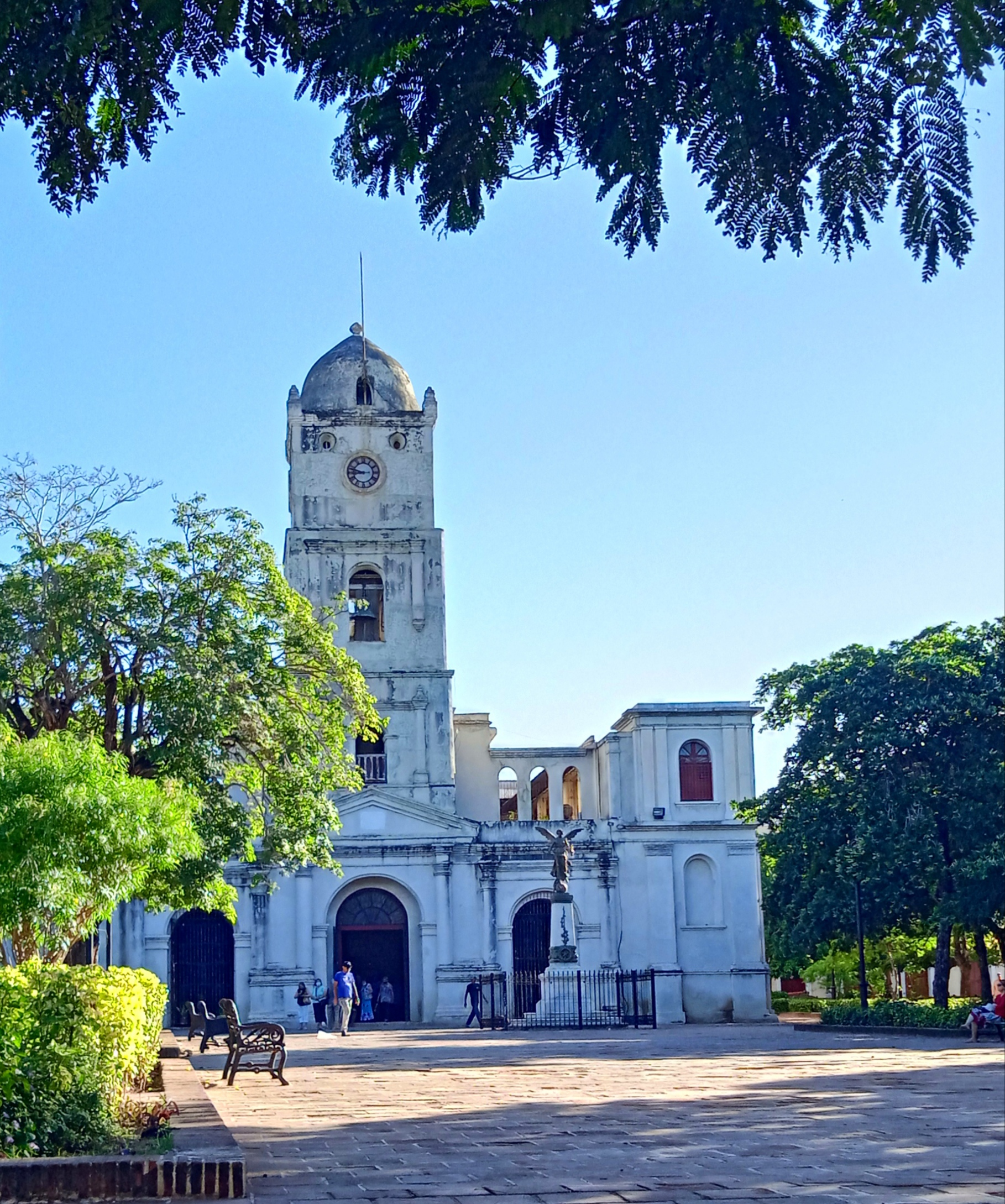
San José Church

There are several small city parks such as Parque Infantil, Parque San José, Parque San Isidoro (Las Flores), Parque Martí, among others, most central the Calixto García in the downtown area. Close by one finds the galleries Centro Provincial de Arte and Bayado, a library, the club Casa de la Trova, the Martí cinema, the Theatre Eddy Suñol, the Province Museum La Periquera, a science museum, and a history museum.

One of the most famous landmarks of the city is the hill Loma de la Cruz (English: Hill of the Cross), which can be ascended by climbing its +450 stairs, and from where the whole city can be admired. There, in the early years of the city, a large cross was erected with the belief that it would protect it from evil coming down from the North.

Holguín has a baseball stadium, named after Calixto García.

=== Transportation ===
Holguín is served by Frank País Airport (HOG/MUHG), located at 20°47´08"N, 076°18´54"W, with flights to Havana and several other world destinations, mostly in Canada and Europe. The local transportation used by natives are buses, Bicitaxi, and taxi.

== Education ==
The main post-secondary education institution is the University of Holguín "Oscar Lucero Moya" (Spanish: Universidad de Holguín "Oscar Lucero Moya", UHO).

Other post-secondary educational centers are: Universidad de Ciencias Médicas (University of Medical Sciences) "Mariana Grajales", Universidad Pedagógica (Pedagogical University of Holguin, formerly Instituto Superior Pedagógico, ISPH) "José de la Luz y Caballero", and Universidad Deportiva (formerly Facultad de Cultura Física) "Manuel Piti Fajardo".

== Notable people ==
- Faustino Oramas, Cuban composer and musician
- Mario Kindelán, Olympic Gold Medalist amateur boxer
- Fredi González, MLB manager and coach
- Eglise Gutiérrez, opera singer
- Reinaldo Arenas, poet and novelist
- Oscar Hijuelos, Cuban-American Pulitzer Prize-winning author, whose parents were born and raised in Holguín before immigrating to the USA.
- Puntillita (Manuel Licea), Cuban popular singer
- Aroldis Chapman, Major League Baseball player
- Odalis Revé, Olympic Gold Medallist judoka

== Sister cities ==
- Santa Fe, New Mexico, United States
- Saltillo, Coahuila, Mexico
- Yazd, Yazd Province, Iran
