= Estadio Guillermón Moncada =

Multi-use stadium in Santiago de Cuba, Cuba

Coordinates: 20°2′4″N 75°48′44″W

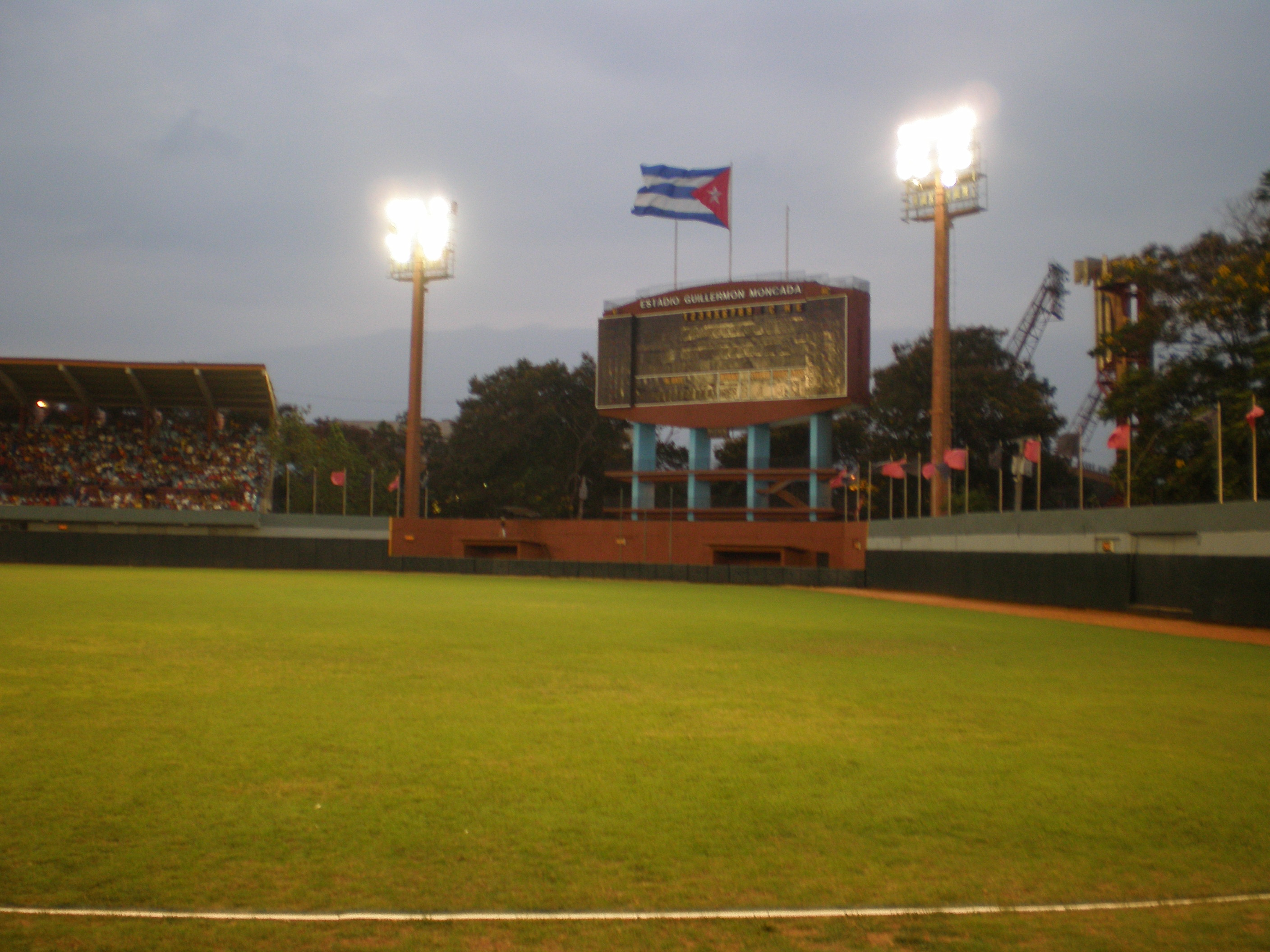
The scoreboard in Estadio Guillermón Moncada

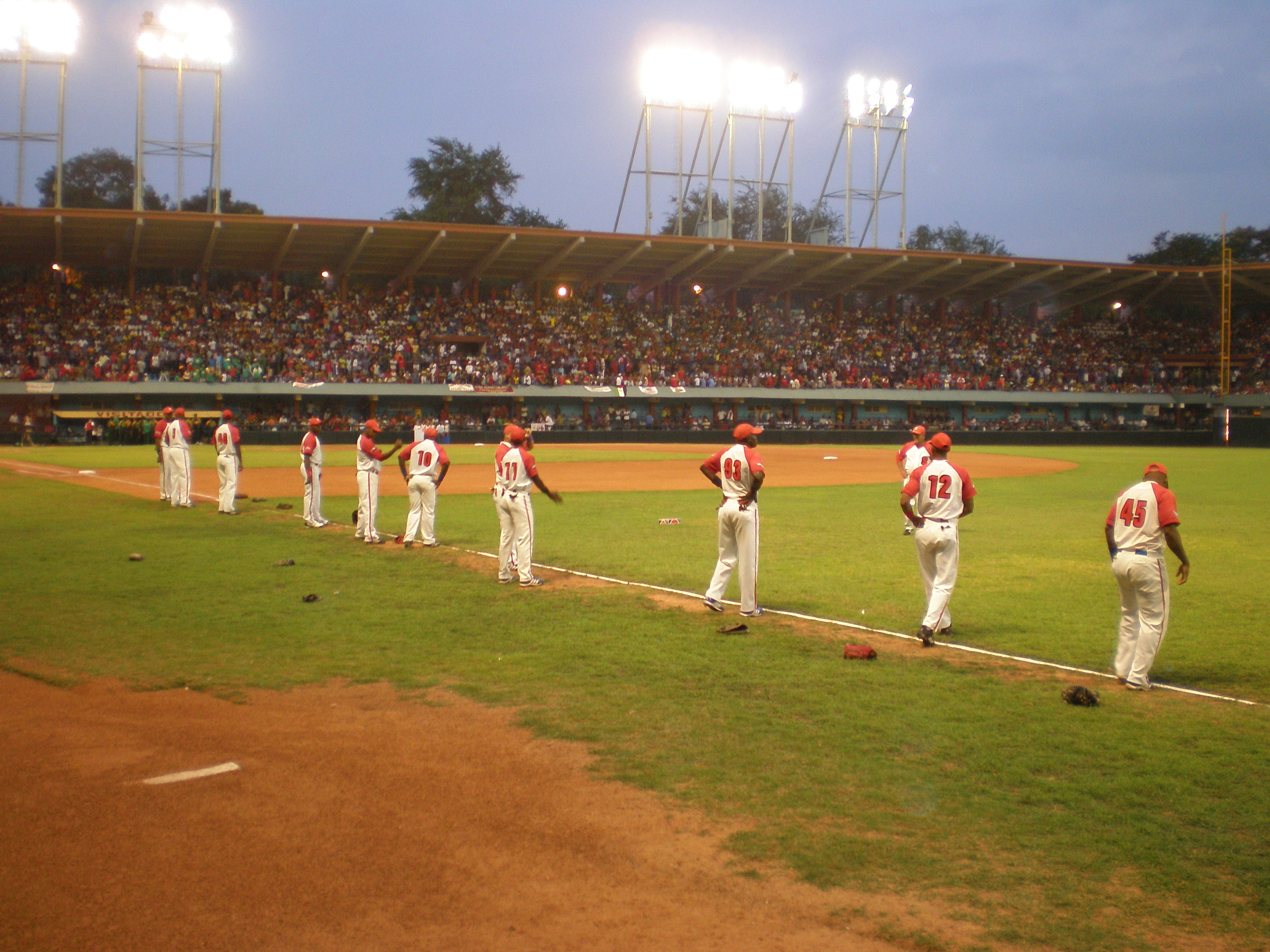
Players on the field in the final series against Pinar del Río, April 2008

Estadio Guillermón Moncada is a multi-use stadium in Santiago de Cuba, Cuba. It is the second largest baseball stadium in Cuba and comfortably seats 25,000 spectators. The stadium was inaugurated on February 24, 1964. It is a project of the architect Emilio Castro.

The stadium is named after Guillermón Moncada, the "Ebony Giant", who was one of the 29 Cuban Generals of the War of Independence. Born in Santiago de Cuba, he participated in the three wars against Spain. He died in 1896 of tuberculosis in this city.

In its environs there is also a softball stadium, an athletics track, soccer field and a gym for weights and judo.

This stadium is the home of the Avispas de Santiago de Cuba.
