= Baseball at the 2023 Central American and Caribbean Games – Men's team rosters =

The following is a list of rosters for each nation competing in men's baseball at the 2023 Central American and Caribbean Games.

== Key ==
Pos.	Position
P	Pitcher
C	Catcher
IF	Infielder
OF	Outfielder

== Rosters ==
=== Cuba ===
Manager
(Cuba) Armando Johnson

Player	Pos.	DOB and age	Team	League	Birthplace
Jonathan Carbó	P	14 November 1997 (aged 25)	(Cuba) Piratas de Isla de la Juventud	Cuban National Series	(Cuba) Isla de la Juventud
Naikel Cruz	P	29 April 1999 (aged 24)	(Cuba) Cocodrilos de Matanzas	Cuban National Series	(Cuba) Matanzas Province
Javier Mirabal	P	19 January 1997 (aged 26)	(Cuba) Naranjas de Villa Clara	Cuban National Series	(Cuba) Placetas, Villa Clara
Miguel Neira	P	7 September 2004 (aged 18)	(Cuba) Gallos de Sancti Spiritus	Cuban National Series	(Cuba) Sancti Spiritus Province
Franky Quintana	P	21 May 1995 (aged 28)	(Cuba) Piratas de Isla de la Juventud	Cuban National Series	(Cuba) Isla de la Juventud
Yeudis Reyes	P	17 November 1995 (aged 27)	(Cuba) Indios de Guantánamo	Cuban National Series	(Cuba) Guantánamo Province
Renner Rivero	P	5 May 1996 (aged 27)	(Cuba) Cocodrilos de Matanzas	Cuban National Series	(Cuba) Matanzas, Matanzas
José Ramón Rodríguez	P	18 August 1992 (aged 30)	(Cuba) Toros de Camagüey	Cuban National Series	(Cuba) Camagüey Province
Carlos Viera	P	6 December 1988 (aged 34)	(Cuba) Leñadores de Las Tunas	Cuban National Series	(Cuba) Jobabo, Las Tunas
Yoennis Yera	P	18 October 1989 (aged 33)	(Mexico) Olmecas de Tabasco	Mexican League	(Cuba) Martí, Matanzas
Yunior Ibarra	C	13 April 1995 (aged 28)	(Cuba) Gallos de Sancti Spiritus	Cuban National Series	(Cuba) Sancti Spiritus Province
Andrys Pérez	C	9 February 2001 (aged 22)	(Cuba) Cocodrilos de Matanzas	Cuban National Series	(Cuba) Matanzas Province
Erisbel Arruebarrena	IF	25 March 1990 (aged 33)	(Cuba) Cocodrilos de Matanzas	Cuban National Series	(Cuba) Cienfuegos, Cienfuegos
Guillermo Avilés	IF	20 January 1993 (aged 30)	(Cuba) Alazanes de Granma	Cuban National Series	(Cuba) Bayamo, Granma
Dayán García	IF	16 July 1987 (aged 35)	(Cuba) Cazadores de Artemisa	Cuban National Series	(Cuba) Mayabeque Province
Yasniel González	IF	15 May 1990 (aged 33)	(Cuba) Huracanes de Mayabeque	Cuban National Series	(Cuba) Mayabeque Province
Andrés Hernández	IF	22 March 1996 (aged 27)			Cuba
Yordan Manduley	IF	9 February 1986 (aged 37)	(Cuba) Sabuesos de Holguín	Cuban National Series	(Cuba) Calixto García, Holguín
Luis Vicente Mateo	IF	19 January 1996 (aged 27)	(Cuba) Elefantes de Cienfuegos	Cuban National Series	(Cuba) Cienfuegos Province
Yadil Mujica	IF	1 January 1985 (aged 38)	(Cuba) Cocodrilos de Matanzas	Cuban National Series	(Cuba) Matanzas Province
Yurisbel Gracial	OF	14 October 1985 (aged 37)	(Cuba) Cocodrilos de Matanzas	Cuban National Series	(Cuba) Guantánamo, Guantánamo
Yoelkis Guibert	OF	29 August 1994 (aged 28)	Avispas de Santiago de Cuba	Cuban National Series	Palma Soriano, Santiago de Cuba
Raico Santos	OF	20 April 1994 (aged 29)	(Cuba) Alazanes de Granma	Cuban National Series	(Cuba) Buey Arriba, Granma
Roel Santos	OF	15 September 1987 (aged 35)	(Mexico) Olmecas de Tabasco	Mexican League	(Cuba) Niquero, Granma

=== Curaçao ===
Manager
(Curaçao) Carlos Pineda

Player	Pos.	DOB and age	Team	League	Birthplace
Marlison Brunken	P	6 July 1994 (aged 28)	(Curaçao) Groot Kwartier Stars	Curaçao National Championship AA League	Curaçao
Elchero Francisca	P	10 August 2002 (aged 20)	(Curaçao) Royal Scorpions	Curaçao National Championship AA League	Willemstad, Curaçao
Hershelon Juliana	P	6 February 1993 (aged 30)	(Curaçao) Santa Rosa Indians	Curaçao National Championship AA League	Willemstad, Curaçao
Sedley Karel	P	13 July 1990 (aged 32)	(Netherlands) HCAW	Honkbal Hoofdklasse	Curaçao
Christopher Koeiman	P	22 August 1999 (aged 23)			Willemstad, Curaçao
Je-Andrick Lourens	P	27 June 2002 (aged 20)	(Curaçao) Royal Scorpions	Curaçao National Championship AA League	Willemstad, Curaçao
Temesh Lourens	P	7 May 1992 (aged 31)	(Curaçao) Royal Scorpions	Curaçao National Championship AA League	Curaçao
Jordan Lucas	P	9 September 1990 (aged 32)	(Curaçao) Santa Rosa Indians	Curaçao National Championship AA League	Curaçao
Ruderly Manuel	P	26 August 1990 (aged 32)	(Curaçao) Wildcats KJ74	Curaçao National Championship AA League	Willemstad, Curaçao
Cerilio Soleana	P	22 April 1997 (aged 26)	(Curaçao) Royal Scorpions	Curaçao National Championship AA League	Utrecht, Netherlands
Ortwin Pieternella	C	4 April 1996 (aged 27)	San Marino Baseball	Serie A	Maracaibo, Venezuela
Ulrich Snijders	C	8 July 1986 (aged 36)	(Curaçao) Wildcats KJ74	Curaçao National Championship AA League	Willemstad, Curaçao
Stephan Vidal	C	4 April 1996 (aged 27)	(Curaçao) Royal Scorpions	Curaçao National Championship AA League	Willemstad, Curaçao
Roderick Bernadina	IF	10 August 1992 (aged 30)	(Curaçao) Royal Scorpions	Curaçao National Championship AA League	Willemstad, Curaçao
Swindly Lint	IF	27 August 1997 (aged 25)	(Curaçao) Santa Rosa Indians	Curaçao National Championship AA League	Curaçao
Dudley Leonora	IF	15 December 1991 (aged 31)	San Marino Baseball	Serie A	Sint Maarten
Kevin Moesquit	IF	20 June 1991 (aged 32)	(Curaçao) Santa Maria Pirates	Curaçao National Championship AA League	Willemstad, Curaçao
Alexander Rodriguez	IF	14 September 1993 (aged 29)	(Curaçao) Wildcats KJ74	Curaçao National Championship AA League	Willemstad, Curaçao
Darren Seferina	IF	24 January 1994 (aged 29)	(Curaçao) Santa Maria Pirates	Curaçao National Championship AA League	Willemstad, Curaçao
Andrelton Simmons	IF	4 September 1989 (aged 33)	(Curaçao) Marchena Braves	Curaçao National Championship AA League	Willemstad, Curaçao
Jamal Zalm	IF	21 September 2002 (aged 20)			Willemstad, Curaçao
Rayshelon Carolina	OF	24 May 1993 (aged 30)	(Netherlands) Curaçao Neptunus	Honkbal Hoofdklasse	Curaçao
Ericson Leonora	OF	25 August 1992 (aged 30)	San Marino Baseball	Serie A	Punto Fijo, Venezuela
Raysheandel Michel	OF	26 September 1997 (aged 25)	(Curaçao) Wildcats KJ74	Curaçao National Championship AA League	Curaçao

=== Dominican Republic ===
Manager
(Dominican Republic) Félix Fermín

Player	Pos.	DOB and age	Team	League	Birthplace
Francisco López	P	13 February 1994 (aged 29)	(Dominican Republic) Terrenero Soy	LINORD	(Dominican Republic) La Romana, La Romana
Carlos Paulino	C	24 September 1989 (aged 33)	(Dominican Republic) Águilas Cibaeñas	LIDOM	(Dominican Republic) Puerto Plata, Puerto Plata
Darlin Germán	IF	21 April 1990 (aged 33)	(Dominican Republic) Municipal Nagua	LINORD	Dominican Republic
Carlos Jiménez	IF	3 July 1993 (aged 29)	(Dominican Republic) Terrenero Soy	LINORD	(Dominican Republic) Moca, Espaillat
Irving Ortega	IF	30 October 1996 (aged 26)	(Dominican Republic) Terrenero Soy	LINORD	(Dominican Republic) Santo Domingo
Luis Valenzuela	IF	25 August 1993 (aged 29)	(Dominican Republic) Municipal Nagua	LINORD	(Dominican Republic) Laguna Salada, Valverde
Adrián Valerio	IF	13 March 1997 (aged 26)	(Venezuela) Centauros de La Guaira	Venezuelan Major League	(Dominican Republic) Salcedo, Hermanas Mirabal
Marcos Almonte	OF	28 March 1996 (aged 27)	(Dominican Republic) Titanes de Samana	LINORD	(Dominican Republic) Santiago, Santiago
Ricardo Céspedes	OF	24 August 1997 (aged 25)	(United States) Staten Island FerryHawks	Atlantic League	(United States) New York City, New York
Edgar Figueroa	OF	2 December 1994 (aged 28)			(Dominican Republic) Pimentel, Duarte
Seuly Matías	OF	4 September 1998 (aged 24)	(Venezuela) Senadores de Caracas	Venezuelan Major League	(Dominican Republic) La Isabela, Puerto Plata
Wildert Pujols	OF	7 June 1994 (aged 29)	(Dominican Republic) Titanes de Samana	LINORD	(Dominican Republic) San José de Ocoa, San José de Ocoa

=== El Salvador ===
Manager
(Nicaragua) Jorge Luis Avellán

Player	Pos.	DOB and age	Team	League	Birthplace

=== Mexico ===
Manager
(Mexico) Enrique Reyes

Player	Pos.	DOB and age	Team	League	Birthplace
Faustino Carrera	P	9 March 1999 (aged 24)	(Mexico) Toros de Tijuana	Mexican League	(Mexico) Ciudad Obregón, Sonora
Fabián Cota	P	13 April 1992 (aged 31)	(Mexico) Diablos Rojos del México	Mexican League	(Mexico) Los Mochis, Sinaloa
David Gutiérrez	P	18 August 1993 (aged 29)	(Mexico) Olmecas de Tabasco	Mexican League	(Mexico) Guamúchil, Sinaloa
Francisco Haro	P	17 February 1997 (aged 26)	(Mexico) Leones de Yucatán	Mexican League	(Mexico) Los Mochis, Sinaloa
Arturo López	P	22 February 1983 (aged 40)	(Mexico) Diablos Rojos del México	Mexican League	(Mexico) Culiacán, Sinaloa
Luis Miranda	P	5 September 1994 (aged 28)	(Mexico) Guerreros de Oaxaca	Mexican League	(Mexico) Hermosillo, Sonora
Aldo Montes	P	2 February 1990 (aged 33)	(Mexico) Algodoneros de Unión Laguna	Mexican League	(Mexico) Tijuana, Baja California
Carlos Morales	P	5 January 1997 (aged 26)	(Mexico) Sultanes de Monterrey	Mexican League	(Mexico) Saltillo, Coahuila
Yoanner Negrín	P	29 April 1984 (aged 39)	(Mexico) Leones de Yucatán	Mexican League	Havana, Cuba
Wilmer Ríos	P	3 March 1994 (aged 29)	(Mexico) Acereros de Monclova	Mexican League	(Mexico) Guasave, Sinaloa
Alexandro Tovalín	P	25 November 1997 (aged 25)	(Mexico) Leones de Yucatán	Mexican League	(United States) San Diego, California
Samuel Zazueta	P	21 November 1996 (aged 26)	(Mexico) El Águila de Veracruz	Mexican League	(Mexico) Ciudad Obregón, Sonora
Fernando Flores	C	21 August 1991 (aged 31)	(Mexico) Toros de Tijuana	Mexican League	(Mexico) Ciudad Obregón, Sonora
Alexis Wilson	C	13 August 1996 (aged 26)	(Mexico) Tigres de Quintana Roo	Mexican League	(Mexico) Los Mochis, Sinaloa
Jasson Atondo	IF	27 August 1995 (aged 27)	(Mexico) Olmecas de Tabasco	Mexican League	(Mexico) El Colorado, Sinaloa
Emmanuel Ávila	IF	26 November 1988 (aged 34)	(Mexico) Guerreros de Oaxaca	Mexican League	(Mexico) Los Mochis, Sinaloa
Edson García	IF	11 September 1992 (aged 30)	(Mexico) Acereros de Monclova	Mexican League	(Mexico) Puebla City, Puebla
Moisés Gutiérrez	IF	19 November 1994 (aged 28)	(Mexico) Diablos Rojos del México	Mexican League	(Mexico) San Luis Potosí City, San Luis Potosí
Víctor Mendoza	IF	30 November 1990 (aged 32)	(Mexico) Sultanes de Monterrey	Mexican League	(Mexico) Ciudad Obregón, Sonora
Héctor Mora	IF	21 December 2002 (aged 20)	(Mexico) El Águila de Veracruz	Mexican League	(Mexico) Veracruz City, Veracruz
Norberto Obeso	OF	9 July 1995 (aged 27)	(Mexico) Leones de Yucatán	Mexican League	(Mexico) Hermosillo, Sonora
Randy Romero	OF	10 August 1999 (aged 23)	(Mexico) Mariachis de Guadalajara	Mexican League	(Mexico) Mexicali, Baja California
Rainel Rosario	OF	29 March 1989 (aged 34)	(Mexico) Saraperos de Saltillo	Mexican League	Santo Domingo, Dominican Republic
Fernando Villegas	OF	28 June 1998 (aged 24)	(Mexico) Saraperos de Saltillo	Mexican League	(Mexico) Saltillo, Coahuila

=== Nicaragua ===
Manager
(Nicaragua) Sandor Guido

Player	Pos.	DOB and age	Team	League	Birthplace
Danilo Bermúdez	P	22 March 1999 (aged 24)	(Nicaragua) Frente Sur de Rivas	Campeonato de Béisbol Superior	(Nicaragua) Rivas, Rivas
Jorge Bucardo	P	18 October 1989 (aged 33)	(Nicaragua) Dantos de Managua	Campeonato de Béisbol Superior	(Nicaragua) León, León
Leonardo Crawford	P	2 February 1997 (aged 26)	(Nicaragua) Dantos de Managua	Campeonato de Béisbol Superior	(Nicaragua) Puerto Cabezas
Keny Cruz	P	31 January 2000 (aged 23)	(Nicaragua) Tiburones de Granada	Campeonato de Béisbol Superior	(Nicaragua) Granada, Granada
Oliver Espinoza	P	2 August 1998 (aged 24)	(Nicaragua) Fieras del San Fernando	Campeonato de Béisbol Superior	(Nicaragua) Managua, Managua
Fidencio Flores	P	19 September 1991 (aged 31)	(Nicaragua) Leones de León	Campeonato de Béisbol Superior	(Nicaragua) El Sauce, León
Jesús Garrido	P	10 May 1995 (aged 28)	(Nicaragua) Tigres del Chinandega	Campeonato de Béisbol Superior	(Nicaragua) Chinandega, Chinandega
Ernesto Glasgon	P	5 October 1991 (aged 31)	(Nicaragua) Pescadores del Caribe Norte	Campeonato de Béisbol Superior	(Nicaragua) Puerto Cabezas
Osman Gutiérrez	P	15 December 1994 (aged 28)	(Canada) Trois-Rivières Aigles	Frontier League	(Nicaragua) León, León
Junior Téllez	P	1 July 1990 (aged 32)	(Nicaragua) Leones de León	Campeonato de Béisbol Superior	(Nicaragua) León, León
Bryan Torres	P	12 April 2001 (aged 22)	(Nicaragua) Leones de León	Campeonato de Béisbol Superior	(Nicaragua) León, León
Rodolfo Bone	C	22 March 2000 (aged 23)	(Nicaragua) Fieras del San Fernando	Campeonato de Béisbol Superior	(Nicaragua) Masaya, Masaya
Melvin Novoa	C	17 June 1996 (aged 27)	(United States) Washington Wild Things	Frontier League	(Nicaragua) Nandaime, Granada
Benjamín Alegría	IF	6 August 1997 (aged 25)	(Nicaragua) Dantos de Managua	Campeonato de Béisbol Superior	(Nicaragua) Managua, Managua
Aldo Espinoza	IF	11 September 1998 (aged 24)	(Nicaragua) Dantos de Managua	Campeonato de Béisbol Superior	(Nicaragua) Managua, Managua
Jacksell Mairena	IF	11 May 1995 (aged 28)	(Nicaragua) Estelí	Campeonato de Béisbol Superior	(Nicaragua) La Trinidad, Estelí
Elian Miranda	IF	31 May 1999 (aged 24)	(Nicaragua) Tigres del Chinandega	Campeonato de Béisbol Superior	(Nicaragua) El Viejo, Chinandega
Edgard Montiel	IF	13 November 1998 (aged 24)	(Nicaragua) Indios del Bóer	Campeonato de Béisbol Superior	(Nicaragua) Managua, Managua
José Saúl Orozco	IF	6 March 1999 (aged 24)	(Nicaragua) Indígenas de Matagalpa	Campeonato de Béisbol Superior	(Nicaragua) Ciudad Darío, Matagalpa
Sandy Bermúdez	OF	9 August 1994 (aged 28)	(Nicaragua) Toros de Chontales	Campeonato de Béisbol Superior	(Nicaragua) Juigalpa, Chontales
Juan Montes	OF	15 May 1995 (aged 28)	(United States) Tri-City ValleyCats	Frontier League	Guatemala City, Guatemala
Bismarck Rivera	OF	21 October 1996 (aged 26)	(Nicaragua) Indios del Bóer	Campeonato de Béisbol Superior	(Nicaragua) Managua, Managua
Gean Rigby	OF	7 January 1997 (aged 26)	(Nicaragua) Caribe Sur	Campeonato de Béisbol Superior	(Nicaragua) Laguna de Perlas
Norlando Valle	OF	2 August 1994 (aged 28)	(Nicaragua) Leones de León	Campeonato de Béisbol Superior	(Nicaragua) León, León

=== Puerto Rico ===
Manager
(Puerto Rico) Juan González

Player	Pos.	DOB and age	Team	League	Birthplace
José Carlos Burgos	P	17 July 1991 (aged 31)	(Puerto Rico) Toritos de Cayey	Béisbol Doble A	Puerto Rico
Freddie Cabrera	P	25 January 1990 (aged 33)	(Puerto Rico) Toritos de Cayey	Béisbol Doble A	Moca Puerto Rico
Luis Leroy Cruz	P	10 September 1990 (aged 32)	(Puerto Rico) Pescadores del Plata de Comerío	Béisbol Doble A	San Juan, Puerto Rico
Jan Figueroa	P	16 September 1999 (aged 23)	(Puerto Rico) Cachorros de Ponce	Béisbol Doble A	San Juan, Puerto Rico
Iván Houellemont	P	10 September 1998 (aged 24)	(Puerto Rico) Guerrilleros de Rio Grande	Béisbol Doble A	Fajardo, Puerto Rico
Bryan Marrero	P	2 November 1999 (aged 23)	(Puerto Rico) Libertadores de Hormigueros	Béisbol Doble A	Corozal, Puerto Rico
Josué Montañez	P	15 January 1992 (aged 31)	(Puerto Rico) Bravos de Cidra	Béisbol Doble A	San Juan, Puerto Rico
Ramesis Rosa	P	15 August 1985 (aged 37)	(Puerto Rico) Artesanos de Las Piedras	Béisbol Doble A	Puerto Rico
Andrés Santiago	P	26 October 1989 (aged 33)	(Puerto Rico) Cafeteros de Yauco	Béisbol Doble A	Cataño, Puerto Rico
Christian Torres	P	7 September 1993 (aged 29)	(Puerto Rico) Guerrilleros de Rio Grande	Béisbol Doble A	Canóvanas, Puerto Rico
Julio Torres	P	14 August 1987 (aged 35)	(Puerto Rico) Guardianes de Dorado	Béisbol Doble A	Puerto Rico
Miguel Mejía	P	19 January 1988 (aged 35)	(Puerto Rico) Leones de Patillas	Béisbol Doble A	(United States) New York City, New York
Rubén Castro	C	10 July 1996 (aged 26)	(Puerto Rico) Azucareros de Yabucoa	Béisbol Doble A	Humacao, Puerto Rico
Jan Vázquez	C	29 April 1991 (aged 32)	(Puerto Rico) Samaritanos de San Lorenzo	Béisbol Doble A	San Lorenzo, Puerto Rico
Edwin Gómez	IF	26 August 1991 (aged 31)	(Puerto Rico) Azucareros de Yabucoa	Béisbol Doble A	Caguas, Puerto Rico
Kenen Irizarry	IF	6 May 2000 (aged 23)	(Puerto Rico) Criollos de Caguas	Béisbol Doble A	Yauco, Puerto Rico
Kevin Luciano	IF	15 July 1993 (aged 29)	(Puerto Rico) Toritos de Cayey	Béisbol Doble A	(United States) Cambridge, Massachusetts
Ozzie Martínez	IF	7 May 1988 (aged 35)	(Puerto Rico) Artesanos de Las Piedras	Béisbol Doble A	Carolina, Puerto Rico
Jeremy Rivera	IF	30 January 1995 (aged 28)	(Puerto Rico) Navegantes de Aguada	Béisbol Doble A	Aguada, Puerto Rico
Yadiel Rivera	IF	2 May 1992 (aged 31)	(Puerto Rico) Jueyeros de Maunabo	Béisbol Doble A	Caguas, Puerto Rico
Jesmuel Valentín	IF	12 May 1994 (aged 29)	(Puerto Rico) Atenienses de Manatí	Béisbol Doble A	Manatí, Puerto Rico
Jeffrey Domínguez	OF	31 July 1986 (aged 36)	(Puerto Rico) Bravos de Cidra	Béisbol Doble A	Carolina, Puerto Rico
Miguel Egea	OF	28 February 1995 (aged 28)	(Puerto Rico) Halcones de Gurabo	Béisbol Doble A	Puerto Rico
Bryan Miranda	OF	30 September 1997 (aged 25)	(Puerto Rico) Atenienses de Manatí	Béisbol Doble A	Aguadilla, Puerto Rico

=== Venezuela ===
Manager
(Venezuela) Carlos García

Player	Pos.	DOB and age	Team	League	Birthplace
Oscar Abreu	P	11 December 1999 (aged 23)	Free agent		(Venezuela) Valencia, Carabobo
Iván Andueza	P	7 February 1995 (aged 28)	(Venezuela) Caciques de Distrito	Venezuelan Major League	(Venezuela) Barquisimeto, Lara
Carlos Chourio	P	6 January 2000 (aged 23)	(Venezuela) Marineros de Carabobo	Venezuelan Major League	Venezuela
Dannys Hernández	P	19 November 1985 (aged 37)	Free agent		(Venezuela) Carabobo
Ángel León	P	16 April 2001 (aged 22)	Free agent		Venezuela
José Martínez	P	29 October 1996 (aged 26)	(Venezuela) Marineros de Carabobo	Venezuelan Major League	(Venezuela) San Felipe, Yaracuy
Eduardo Paredes	P	6 March 1995 (aged 28)	(Venezuela) Senadores de Caracas	Venezuelan Major League	(Venezuela) Valera, Trujillo
Sebastián Perrone	P	8 April 2000 (aged 23)	(Venezuela) Guerreros del Caribe	Venezuelan Major League	(Venezuela) Valencia, Carabobo
Wuilder Rodríguez	P	21 January 1993 (aged 30)	(Venezuela) Samanes de Aragua	Venezuelan Major League	(Venezuela) Puerto Cabello, Carabobo
Brayan Salaya	P	13 February 2000 (aged 23)	Free agent		(Venezuela) Caracas
Carlos Valero	P	10 April 1999 (aged 24)	(Venezuela) Líderes de Miranda	Venezuelan Major League	(Venezuela) Barinas, Barinas
Sonny Vargas	P	8 November 2000 (aged 22)	(Venezuela) Senadores de Caracas	Venezuelan Major League	(Venezuela) Valencia, Carabobo
Alex Monsalve	C	22 April 1992 (aged 31)	(Venezuela) Samanes de Aragua	Venezuelan Major League	(Venezuela) Boquerón, Carabobo
José Ortega	C	14 November 1997 (aged 25)	(Venezuela) Marineros de Carabobo	Venezuelan Major League	Venezuela
Yoandy Rea	C	12 June 2000 (aged 23)	(Venezuela) Marineros de Carabobo	Venezuelan Major League	(Venezuela) Valencia, Carabobo
Derwin Barreto	IF	1 September 2000 (aged 22)	(Venezuela) Marineros de Carabobo	Venezuelan Major League	(Venezuela) San Diego, Carabobo
José García	IF	11 February 1988 (aged 35)	Free agent		(Venezuela) Caracas
Michael Chirinos	IF	11 October 1999 (aged 23)	(Venezuela) Delfines de La Guaira	Venezuelan Major League	(Venezuela) Puerto Cabello, Carabobo
Junnell Ledezma	IF	9 November 1995 (aged 27)	Free agent		(Venezuela) San Felipe, Yaracuy
Juan Infante	OF	9 November 1996 (aged 26)	(Venezuela) Marineros de Carabobo	Venezuelan Major League	(Venezuela) Zaraza, Guárico
Anderson Meléndez	OF	31 May 2000 (aged 23)	(Venezuela) Centauros de La Guaira	Venezuelan Major League	(Venezuela) Barquisimeto, Lara
César Ortega	OF	16 October 2000 (aged 22)	(Venezuela) Caciques de Distrito	Venezuelan Major League	(Venezuela) Caracas
Jonel Pacheco	OF	3 October 1982 (aged 40)	Free agent		(Venezuela) Tacarigua, Miranda
Wuilman Velásquez	OF	7 February 2003 (aged 20)	(Venezuela) Centauros de La Guaira	Venezuelan Major League	(Venezuela) San Felipe, Yaracuy
