= Baseball at the 2023 Pan American Games – Men's team rosters =

The following is a list of rosters for each nation that competed in the men's baseball tournament at the 2023 Pan American Games in Santiago, Chile.

== Key ==
Pos.	Position
P	Pitcher
C	Catcher
IF	Infielder
OF	Outfielder

== Group A ==
=== Chile ===
Manager

(Chile) Kaleb Godinez

Player	Pos.	DOB and age	Team	League	Birthplace
Anderson Castro	OF	16 October 2003 (aged 20)			
Manuel Zapata	IF	31 January 1990 (aged 33)			
Roberto Martínez	IF	25 November 1998 (aged 24)			
Cristóbal Hiche	OF	17 October 1983 (aged 40)	(England) Herts Falcons	National Baseball League	Santiago, Chile
Milovan Troncoso	P	18 February 2002 (aged 21)			
Camilo Rivera	P	1 August 2002 (aged 21)			
Bogdan Leyton	P	2 August 1994 (aged 29)	(United States) Baruch Bearcats	City University of New York Athletic Conference	New York City, United States
Gabriel Valladares	C	24 October 1989 (aged 33)			
Elio Quiñones	OF	3 November 1983 (aged 39)			
Nelson Varas	P	2 April 1990 (aged 33)			
Luciano Morales	P	7 February 1994 (aged 29)			
Luciano Echeverría	P, IF	8 May 2001 (aged 22)			
Yerko Mora	P, IF	10 September 2004 (aged 19)			
Andrés Rodríguez	P, OF	21 September 1990 (aged 33)			
David Rubio	IF	1 May 1998 (aged 25)			
José Hernández	OF	26 February 1994 (aged 29)			
Allan Chu	IF	24 February 2003 (aged 20)	(United States) Carl Sandburg Chargers	Arrowhead Conference	Panama City, Panama
Joaquín Quiroz	C	29 December 2000 (aged 22)			
Benjamín Munder	P, OF	29 April 2004 (aged 19)			
Javier Branco Vargas	P	23 May 2002 (aged 21)			
Felipe Rubio	IF	21 April 1995 (aged 28)			
Benjamín Meza	C	22 December 1998 (aged 24)	(United States) Dominican University Chargers	Central Atlantic Collegiate Conference	Miami, United States
Sebastián Vega	P	29 November 1995 (aged 27)			
Emilio Germann-Cisterna	P	7 July 2004 (aged 19)	(Canada) George Brown Huskies	Ontario Colleges Athletic Association	Waterloo, Canada

=== Dominican Republic ===
Manager

(Dominican Republic) Joselito Soriano

Player	Pos.	DOB and age	Team	League	Birthplace
José Acosta	P	23 December 1993 (aged 29)	(Nicaragua) Gigantes de Rivas	Nicaraguan Professional Baseball League	Miches, Dominican Republic
Enmanuel Acosta	P	6 June 1999 (aged 24)	(United States) Visalia Rawhide	California League	La Vega, Dominican Republic
Edwin Adón	P	16 December 1996 (aged 26)	(Canada) Brantford Red Sox	Intercounty Baseball League	Santo Domingo, Dominican Republic
Xavier Batista	IF	18 January 1992 (aged 31)	(Mexico) Piratas de Campeche	Mexican League	San Pedro de Macorís, Dominican Republic
Leliss Beltran	C	14 May 1994 (aged 29)			
Ricardo Céspedes	OF	24 August 1997 (aged 26)	(United States) Staten Island FerryHawks	Atlantic League of Professional Baseball	New York City, United States
Sandro Fabian	OF	6 March 1998 (aged 25)	(United States) Round Rock Express	Pacific Coast League	Santo Domingo, Dominican Republic
Gerson Garabito	P	19 August 1995 (aged 28)	(Nicaragua) Leones de León	Nicaraguan Professional Baseball League	San Cristóbal, Dominican Republic
Rafael García	P	25 September 1999 (aged 24)			
Darlin German	IF	21 April 1990 (aged 33)			
Eric González	C	2 September 1996 (aged 27)	(Dominican Republic) Estrellas Orientales	Dominican Professional Baseball League	Moca, Dominican Republic
Elier Hernández	OF	21 November 1994 (aged 28)	(United States) Round Rock Express	Pacific Coast League	San Cristobal, Dominican Republic
Porfirio López	P	24 March 1990 (aged 33)	(Italy) Fortitudo Baseball 1953	Italian Baseball League	La Vega, Dominican Republic
Víctor Luna	IF	13 September 1991 (aged 32)			
José Molina	P	26 June 1991 (aged 32)	(Nicaragua) Leones de León	Nicaraguan Professional Baseball League	Bonao, Dominican Republic
Deivi Muñoz	IF	30 November 1999 (aged 23)	(United States) Pulaski Yankees	Appalachian League	San Cristobal, Dominican Republic
Irving Ortega	IF	30 October 1996 (aged 26)	(United States) Frederick Keys	Carolina League	Santo Domingo, Dominican Republic
Hansel Paulino	P	3 January 1996 (aged 27)	(United States) Quad Cities River Bandits	Midwest League	La Vega, Dominican Republic
Kelvin Peña	C	4 July 2000 (aged 23)	(United States) FCL Braves	Florida Complex League	Bonao, Dominican Republic
Wildert Pujols	OF	7 June 1994 (aged 29)	(United States) Batavia Muckdogs	New York–Penn League	San Jose, Dominican Republic
Jordis Ramos	P	15 June 1996 (aged 27)	(Dominican Republic) DSL White Sox	Dominican Summer League	Santiago, Dominican Republic
César Rosado	P	22 June 1996 (aged 27)	(United States) Sussex County Miners	Frontier League	Santo Domingo, Dominican Republic
Sammy Tavarez	P	20 October 1998 (aged 25)	(United States) Brooklyn Cyclones	South Atlantic League	Santo Domingo, Dominican Republic
Adrian Valerio	IF	13 March 1997 (aged 26)	(Colombia) Caimanes de Barranquilla	Colombian Professional Baseball League	Salcedo, Dominican Republic

=== Mexico ===
Manager

(Mexico) Enrique Reyes

Player	Pos.	DOB and age	Team	League	Birthplace
Faustino Carrera	P	9 March 1999 (aged 24)	(Mexico) Toros de Tijuana	Mexican League	Ciudad Obregón, Mexico
Fabián Cota	P	13 April 1992 (aged 31)	(Mexico) Diablos Rojos del México	Mexican League	Los Mochis, Mexico
Jesús Cruz	P	15 April 1995 (aged 28)	(Mexico) Leones de Yucatán	Mexican League	Salinas de Hidalgo, Mexico
Francisco Haro	P	17 February 1997 (aged 26)	(Mexico) Leones de Yucatán	Mexican League	Los Mochis, Mexico
Arturo López	P	22 February 1983 (aged 40)	(Mexico) Diablos Rojos del México	Mexican League	Culiacán, Mexico
Luis Fernando Miranda	P	5 September 1994 (aged 29)	(Mexico) Guerreros de Oaxaca	Mexican League	Hermosillo, Mexico
Aldo Montes	P	2 February 1990 (aged 33)	(Mexico) Algodoneros de Unión Laguna	Mexican League	Tijuana, Mexico
Carlos Morales	P	5 January 1997 (aged 26)	(Mexico) Sultanes de Monterrey	Mexican League	Saltillo, Mexico
Wilmer Ríos	P	3 March 1994 (aged 29)	(Mexico) Acereros de Monclova	Mexican League	Guasave, Mexico
Darel Torres	P	5 January 1999 (aged 24)	(Mexico) Tigres de Quintana Roo	Mexican League	Los Mochis, Mexico
Édgar Torres	P	4 September 1996 (aged 27)	(Mexico) Guerreros de Oaxaca	Mexican League	Puebla City, Mexico
Samuel Zazueta	P	21 November 1996 (aged 26)	(Mexico) El Águila de Veracruz	Mexican League	Ciudad Obregón, Mexico
Fernando Flores	C	21 August 1991 (aged 32)	(Mexico) Toros de Tijuana	Mexican League	Ciudad Obregón, Mexico
Alexis Wilson	C	13 August 1996 (aged 27)	(Mexico) Tigres de Quintana Roo	Mexican League	Los Mochis, Mexico
Jasson Atondo	IF	27 August 1995 (aged 28)	(Mexico) Olmecas de Tabasco	Mexican League	El Colorado, Mexico
Emmanuel Ávila	IF	26 November 1988 (aged 34)	(Mexico) Guerreros de Oaxaca	Mexican League	Los Mochis, Mexico
Edson García	IF	11 September 1992 (aged 31)	(Mexico) Acereros de Monclova	Mexican League	Puebla City, Mexico
Moisés Gutiérrez	IF	19 November 1994 (aged 28)	(Mexico) Diablos Rojos del México	Mexican League	San Luis Potosí, Mexico
Roberto Ramos	IF	28 December 1994 (aged 28)	(Mexico) Diablos Rojos del México	Mexican League	Hermosillo, Mexico
Roberto Valenzuela	IF	3 March 1995 (aged 28)	(Mexico) Sultanes de Monterrey	Mexican League	Ciudad Obregón, Mexico
Miguel Guzmán	OF	23 August 1995 (aged 28)	(Mexico) Pericos de Puebla	Mexican League	León, Mexico
Norberto Obeso	OF	9 July 1995 (aged 28)	(Mexico) Leones de Yucatán	Mexican League	Hermosillo, Mexico
Randy Romero	OF	10 August 1999 (aged 24)	(Mexico) Mariachis de Guadalajara	Mexican League	Mexicali, Mexico
Fernando Villegas	OF	28 June 1998 (aged 25)	(Mexico) Saraperos de Saltillo	Mexican League	Saltillo, Mexico

=== Panama ===
Manager

(Panama) Hipolito Lassonde

Player	Pos.	DOB and age	Team	League	Birthplace
Harold Araúz	P	29 May 1995 (aged 28)	(Panama) Chiriquí Occidente	National Baseball Championship	Chiriquí, Panama
Manuel Campos	P	12 January 1990 (aged 33)	(Panama) Los Santos	National Baseball Championship	Chitré, Panama
Julio Denis	P	8 May 1986 (aged 37)	(Panama) Bocas del Toro	National Baseball Championship	Colón, Panama
Steven Fuentes	P	4 May 1997 (aged 26)	(Panama) Chiriquí	National Baseball Championship	Puerto Armuelles, Panama
Severino González	P	28 September 1992 (aged 31)	(Panama) Bocas del Toro	National Baseball Championship	Santiago, Panama
Luis Machuca	P	16 March 1988 (aged 35)	(Panama) Bocas del Toro	National Baseball Championship	Panama City, Panama
Luis Ramos	P	5 June 1995 (aged 28)	(Panama) Darién	National Baseball Championship	Bella Vista, Panama
Carlos Rodríguez	P	13 December 1998 (aged 24)	(Panama) Colón	National Baseball Championship	Panama City, Panama
Davis Romero	P	30 March 1983 (aged 40)	(Panama) Coclé	National Baseball Championship	Aguadulce, Panama
Abdiel Saldaña	P	13 March 1996 (aged 27)	(Panama) Chiriquí	National Baseball Championship	David, Panama
Erasmo Caballero	C	26 May 2001 (aged 22)	(Panama) Chiriquí	National Baseball Championship	Chiriquí, Panama
Adolfo Reina	C	22 January 1990 (aged 33)	(Panama) Los Santos	National Baseball Championship	Santiago, Panama
Carlos Sánchez	C	5 November 1993 (aged 29)	(Panama) Bocas del Toro	National Baseball Championship	Panama City, Panama
Jorge Bishop	IF	12 March 1991 (aged 32)	(Panama) Colón	National Baseball Championship	Colón, Panama
Edgar Muñoz	IF	30 October 1991 (aged 31)	(Panama) Colón	National Baseball Championship	Cristóbal, Panama
Jason Patterson	IF	13 February 2001 (aged 22)	(Panama) Colón	National Baseball Championship	Panama
Jhadiel Santamaría	IF	5 April 1987 (aged 36)	(Panama) Colón	National Baseball Championship	Colón, Panama
Gertrudis Tello	IF	17 July 1996 (aged 27)	(Panama) Herrera	National Baseball Championship	Panama
Eduardo Thomas	IF	18 November 1991 (aged 31)	(Panama) Panamá Metro	National Baseball Championship	Panama
Enoc Watts	IF	2 December 1999 (aged 23)	(Panama) Colón	National Baseball Championship	Panama City, Panama
Luis Castillo	OF	15 May 1989 (aged 34)	(Panama) Coclé	National Baseball Championship	Aguadulce, Panama
José Murdock	OF	20 August 1999 (aged 24)	(Panama) Veraguas	National Baseball Championship	Panama
Abraham Rodríguez	OF	9 March 1999 (aged 24)	(Panama) Panamá Metro	National Baseball Championship	San Miguelito, Panama
Jhonny Santos	OF	2 October 1996 (aged 27)	(Panama) Chiriquí Occidente	National Baseball Championship	Puerto Armuelles, Panama

== Group B ==
=== Brazil ===
Manager

(Brazil) Ramon Ito

Player	Pos.	DOB and age	Team	League	Birthplace
Gabriel Barbosa	P	22 January 2002 (aged 21)	(United States) Fresno Grizzlies	California League	Bastos, Brazil
Felipe Fukuda	P	19 January 1993 (aged 30)	(Brazil) Marília	Brazilian Baseball Championship	Bastos, Brazil
Murilo Gouvea	P	15 September 1988 (aged 35)	(Brazil) Atibaia	Brazilian Baseball Championship	São Paulo, Brazil
Daniel Missaki	P	9 April 1996 (aged 27)	(Brazil) Nippon Blue Jays	Brazilian Baseball Championship	Fujinomiya, Japan
Oscar Nakaoshi	P	28 March 1991 (aged 32)	(Brazil) Anhanguera	Brazilian Baseball Championship	São Paulo, Brazil
Felipe Natel	P	18 April 1989 (aged 34)	(Japan) Yamaha	Japanese Industrial League	Tatuí, Brazil
Eric Pardinho	P	5 January 2001 (aged 22)	(Canada) Vancouver Canadians	Northwest League	Lucélia, Brazil
André Rienzo	P	5 July 1988 (aged 35)	(Brazil) Medicina USP	Brazilian Baseball Championship	São Paulo, Brazil
Enzo Sawayama	P	15 October 2003 (aged 20)	(Japan) Yamaha	Japanese Industrial League	Japan
Douglas Takano	P	18 March 1999 (aged 24)	(Brazil) Maringá	Brazil Baseball League	Maringá, Brazil
Gabriel do Carmo	C	17 May 1995 (aged 28)	(France) Cougars de Montigny	Division Élite	Brazil
Salomon Koba	C	1 March 1997 (aged 26)	(Brazil) Nippon Blue Jays	Brazilian Baseball Championship	Brazil
Raphael Parra	C	24 May 1993 (aged 30)	(Brazil) Marília	Brazilian Baseball Championship	Brazil
Osvaldo Carvalho Jr.	IF	8 June 2001 (aged 22)	(Brazil) Marília	Brazilian Baseball Championship	Brazil
Victor Coutinho	IF	10 February 2001 (aged 22)	(Brazil) Marília	Brazilian Baseball Championship	Brazil
Felipe Mizukosi	IF	26 November 1994 (aged 28)	(Brazil) GECEBS	Brazilian Baseball Championship	Brazil
Pedro Ivo Okuda	IF	20 April 1990 (aged 33)	(Brazil) Marília	Brazilian Baseball Championship	Marília, Brazil
Lucas Rojo	IF	5 April 1994 (aged 29)	(Brazil) Atibaia	Brazilian Baseball Championship	Ibiúna, Brazil
Lucas Sakay	IF	21 June 1997 (aged 26)	(Brazil) Ibiúna	Brazilian Baseball Championship	São Paulo, Brazil
Ariel Frigo	OF	21 June 1990 (aged 33)	(Brazil) Anhanguera	Brazilian Baseball Championship	Brazil
Fabio Murakami	OF	4 March 1988 (aged 35)	(Brazil) Marília	Brazilian Baseball Championship	Três Passos, Brazil
Paulo Orlando	OF	1 November 1985 (aged 37)	(Brazil) Anhanguera	Brazilian Baseball Championship	São Paulo, Brazil
Jean Tome	OF	2 February 1987 (aged 36)	(Brazil) Atibaia	Brazilian Baseball Championship	Atibaia, Brazil

=== Colombia ===
Manager

(Colombia) José Mosquera (Note: Erroneously listed as "Jose Crisson")

Player	Pos.	DOB and age	Team	League	Birthplace
Derwin Pomare	OF	11 May 1995 (aged 28)	(Mexico) Tigres de Quintana Roo	Mexican League	San Andrés de Cuerquia, Colombia
Hernando Mejia	P	8 June 2000 (aged 23)	(Colombia) Vaqueros de Montería	Colombian Professional Baseball League	Cartagena, Colombia
José Ramos	3B, SS	25 October 2002 (aged 20)	(United States) ACL Giants Black	Arizona Complex League	Montería, Colombia
Dilson Herrera	UTL	3 March 1994 (aged 29)	(Mexico) Piratas de Campeche	Mexican League	Cartagena, Colombia
Fabian Pertuz	2B, 3B, SS	1 September 2000 (aged 23)	(United States) Knoxville Smokies	Southern League	Barranquilla, Colombia
Kevin Escorcia	P	5 January 1995 (aged 28)	(Mexico) El Águila de Veracruz	Mexican League	Barranquilla, Colombia
Francisco Acuña	3B, SS	12 January 2000 (aged 23)	(United States) Greensboro Grasshoppers	South Atlantic League	Barranquilla, Colombia
Victor Vargas	P	3 September 2000 (aged 23)	(United States) Reading Fightin Phils	Eastern League	Cartagena, Colombia
Julio Vivas	P	1 October 1993 (aged 30)	(United States) Gary SouthShore RailCats	American Association of Professional Baseball	Táchira, Venezuela
Carlos Arroyo	2B	11 July 2001 (aged 22)	(Mexico) Venados de Mazatlán	Mexican Pacific League	Cartagena, Colombia
Ruben Galindo	P	24 January 2001 (aged 22)	(United States) Lake Elsinore Storm	California League	San Juan de Urabá, Colombia
Jesús Marriaga	P	17 December 1998 (aged 24)	(United States) Gary SouthShore RailCats	American Association of Professional Baseball	Cartagena, Colombia
Jhon Peluffo	P	16 June 1997 (aged 26)	(Colombia) Vaqueros de Montería	Colombian Professional Baseball League	Cartagena, Colombia
Jaider Morelos	UTL	2 January 2000 (aged 23)	(United States) Montreat Cavaliers	Appalachian Athletic Conference	Cartagena, Colombia
Jorge Martinez	P	6 November 2001 (aged 21)	(Dominican Republic) DSL Giants Orange	Dominican Summer League	Barranquilla, Colombia
Santiago Florez	P	9 May 2000 (aged 23)	(United States) Greensboro Grasshoppers	South Atlantic League	Barranquilla, Colombia
Jorge Puerta	C	5 December 2001 (aged 21)	(United States) Rancho Cucamonga Quakes	California League	Tolú, Colombia
Jean Ruiz	P	6 September 1996 (aged 27)	(Italy) New Black Panthers Ronchi dei Legionari	Italian Baseball League	Cartagena, Colombia
Ezequiel Zabaleta	P	20 August 1995 (aged 28)	(Mexico) Guerreros de Oaxaca	Mexican League	Bolívar, Colombia
Carlos Diaz	P	18 November 1993 (aged 29)	(United States) Sioux City Explorers	American Association of Professional Baseball	Montería, Colombia
Randy Consuegra	P	14 October 1989 (aged 34)	(Colombia) Caimanes de Barranquilla	Colombian Professional Baseball League	Barranquilla, Colombia
Carlos Martinez	C	2 May 1995 (aged 28)	(Colombia) Caimanes de Barranquilla	Colombian Professional Baseball League	Cartagena, Colombia
Luis Moreno	P	3 August 1998 (aged 25)	(United States) San Jose Giants	California League	San Cristóbal, Colombia
Leandron Emiliani	OF	22 March 2000 (aged 23)	(United States) Fredericksburg Nationals	Carolina League	San Antero, Colombia

=== Cuba ===
Manager

(Cuba) Armando Zaldivar

Player	Pos.	DOB and age	Team	League	Birthplace
Roel Santos	OF	15 September 1987 (aged 36)	(Mexico) Olmecas de Tabasco	Mexican League	Granma, Cuba
Yadil Mujica	OF	1 January 1985 (aged 38)	(Mexico) Rojos de Caborca	Liga Norte de México	Matanzas, Cuba
Yoelkis Guibert	OF	29 August 1994 (aged 29)	(Mexico) Algodoneros de Guasave	Mexican Pacific League	Palma Soriano, Cuba
Luis Mateo	IF	19 January 1996 (aged 27)	(Cuba) Centrales	Cuban Elite League	Cienfuegos, Cuba
Andi Cosme	C	6 January 1994 (aged 29)	(Cuba) Tabacaleros	Cuban Elite League	
Roberto Baldoquín	IF	14 May 1994 (aged 29)	(United States) Memphis Redbirds	International League	Las Tunas, Cuba
Yasniel González	IF	15 May 1990 (aged 33)	(Cuba) Portuarios	Cuban Elite League	
Geonel Gutiérrez	P	10 April 1994 (aged 29)			
Andrys Pérez	C	9 February 2001 (aged 22)	(Cuba) Centrales	Cuban Elite League	Cuba
Naykel Cruz	P	29 April 1999 (aged 24)	(Mexico) Piratas de Campeche	Mexican League	Matanzas, Cuba
Frank Álvarez	P	16 January 1999 (aged 24)			
Yankiel Mauris	P	2 January 1996 (aged 27)			
Yurisbel Gracial	OF	14 October 1985 (aged 38)	(Cuba) Cocodrilos de Matanzas	Cuban National Series	Guantánamo, Cuba
José Rodríguez	P	18 August 1992 (aged 31)			
Dayan García	IF	16 June 1987 (aged 36)			
Raymond Figueredo	P	19 June 1998 (aged 25)			
Jonathan Carbó	P	14 November 1997 (aged 25)			
Yoanni Yera	P	18 October 1989 (aged 34)	(Mexico) Olmecas de Tabasco	Mexican League	Martí, Cuba
Erly Casanova	P	25 July 1985 (aged 38)			
Renner Rivero	P	5 May 1996 (aged 27)			
Luis González	OF	14 June 1995 (aged 28)			
Erisbel Arruebarrena	IF	25 March 1990 (aged 33)	(Mexico) Algodoneros de Guasave	Mexican Pacific League	Cienfuegos, Cuba
Erisbel Arruebarrena	IF	25 March 1990 (aged 33)	(Cuba) Cocodrilos de Matanzas	Cuban National Series	Cienfuegos, Cuba
Carlos Viera	P	6 December 1988 (aged 34)	(Mexico) Olmecas de Tabasco	Mexican League	Havana, Cuba
Raúl González	IF	22 July 1987 (aged 36)	(Cuba) Ganaderos	Cuban Elite League	Ciego de Ávila, Cuba

=== Venezuela ===
Manager

(Venezuela) Carlos García

Player	Pos.	DOB and age	Team	League	Birthplace
Omar Carrizales	OF	30 January 1995 (aged 28)	(Venezuela) Bravos de Margarita	Venezuelan Professional Baseball League	Maracay, Venezuela
Edgardo Fermin	IF, OF	28 May 1998 (aged 25)	(Venezuela) Caribes de Anzoátegui	Venezuelan Professional Baseball League	Puerto Ordaz, Venezuela
Eduardo Diaz	OF	19 July 1997 (aged 26)	(Venezuela) Caribes de Anzoátegui	Venezuelan Professional Baseball League	Valle de la Pascua, Venezuela
Yonathan Mendoza	IF	10 February 1994 (aged 29)	(Venezuela) Tigres de Aragua	Venezuelan Professional Baseball League	Quíbor, Venezuela
Brayan Salaya	P	13 February 2000 (aged 23)	(Venezuela) Tiburones de La Guaira	Venezuelan Professional Baseball League	Caracas, Venezuela
Osman Marval	UTL	26 November 1986 (aged 36)	(Venezuela) Cardenales de Lara	Venezuelan Professional Baseball League	Punto Fijo, Venezuela
Jose Guzman	P	10 October 2002 (aged 21)	(Venezuela) Navegantes del Magallanes	Venezuelan Professional Baseball League	Maracay, Venezuela
Edgar Duran	IF	10 February 1991 (aged 32)	(Venezuela) Bravos de Margarita	Venezuelan Professional Baseball League	Valencia, Venezuela
Juan Infante	OF	9 November 1996 (aged 26)	(Venezuela) Leones del Caracas	Venezuelan Professional Baseball League	Zaraza, Venezuela
Ivan Andueza	P	7 February 1995 (aged 28)	(Venezuela) Navegantes del Magallanes	Venezuelan Professional Baseball League	Barquisimeto, Venezuela
Bryant Flete	IF, OF	31 January 1993 (aged 30)	(Venezuela) Águilas del Zulia	Venezuelan Professional Baseball League	Cumairebo, Venezuela
Engelb Vielma	IF	22 June 1994 (aged 29)	(United States) Cleburne Railroaders	American Association of Professional Baseball	Maracaibo, Venezuela
Daniel Castillo	IF	25 January 2001 (aged 22)	(United States) ACL Brewers Blue	Arizona Complex League	Valencia, Venezuela
Nivaldo Rodríguez	P	16 April 1996 (aged 27)	(Mexico) Sultanes de Monterrey	Mexican League	Naguanagua, Venezuela
Rayder Ascanio	UTL	17 March 1996 (aged 27)	(Mexico) Generales de Durango	Mexican League	Mariara, Venezuela
Andres Sotillet	P	2 March 1997 (aged 26)	(Venezuela) Caribes de Anzoátegui	Venezuelan Professional Baseball League	Cumaná, Venezuela
Sergio Velis	P	16 January 1995 (aged 28)	(Venezuela) Tigres de Aragua	Venezuelan Professional Baseball League	Anaco, Venezuela
Wuilder Rodriguez	P	21 January 1993 (aged 30)	(Venezuela) Tiburones de La Guaira	Venezuelan Professional Baseball League	Puerto Cabello, Venezuela
Jose Martinez	P	29 October 1996 (aged 26)	(Venezuela) Navegantes del Magallanes	Venezuelan Professional Baseball League	San Felipe, Venezuela
Alex Monsalve	C	22 April 1992 (aged 31)	(Venezuela) Tigres de Aragua	Venezuelan Professional Baseball League	Boquerón, Venezuela
Juan Torres	C	7 October 1988 (aged 35)	Venezuela national baseball team	Caribbean Series	Valencia, Venezuela
