= Rainel Rosario =

Dominican-Mexican baseball player (born 1989)

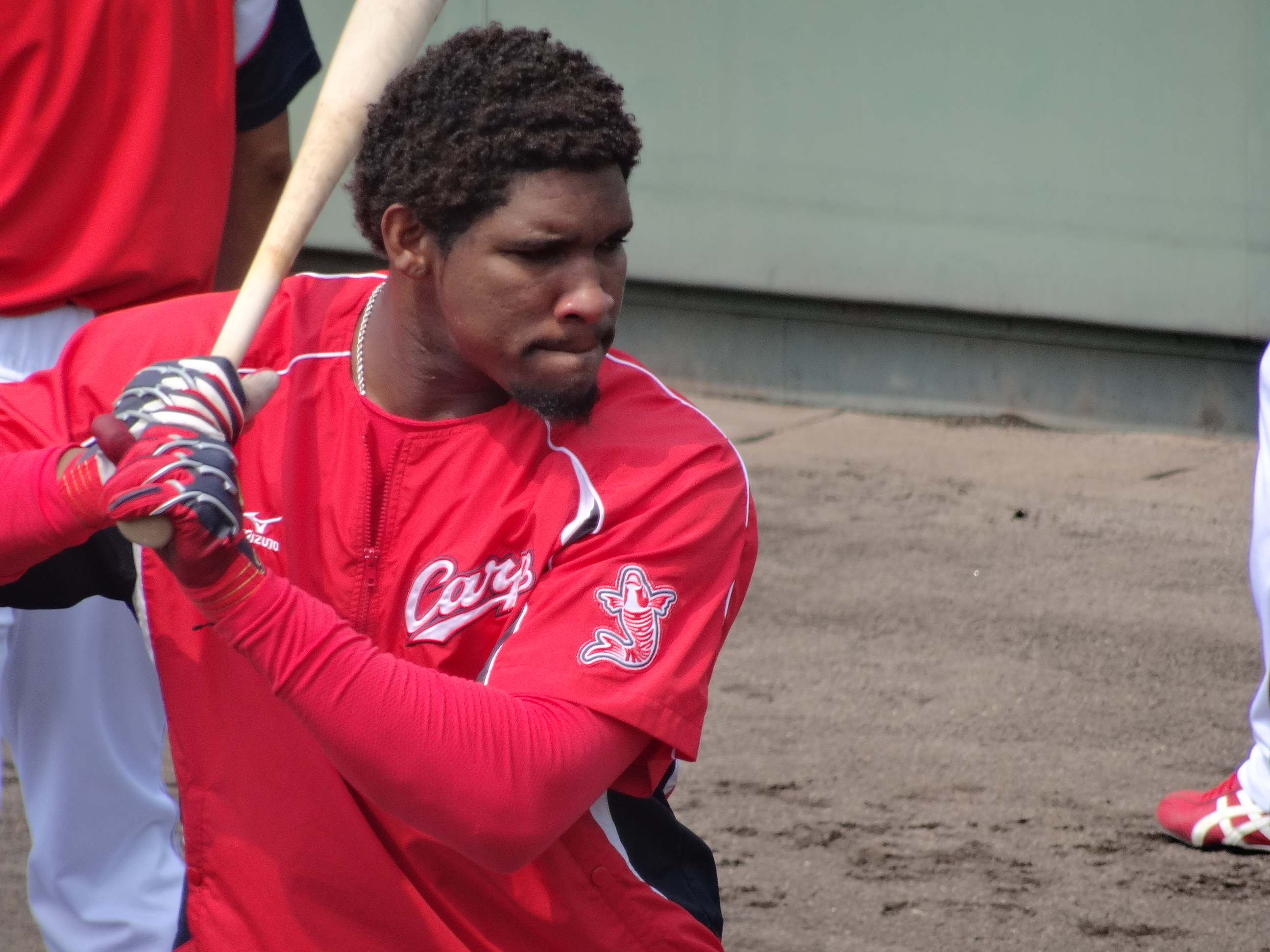
- Rosario with the Hiroshima Toyo Carp

Conspiradores de Querétaro – No. 69
- Outfielder
- Born: March 29, 1989 (age 37); Santo Domingo, Distrito Nacional, Dominican Republic
- Bats: Right Throws: Right

Professional debut
- NPB: April 23, 2014, for the Hiroshima Toyo Carp
- CPBL: September 6, 2022, for the Uni-President Lions

NPB statistics (through 2015 season)
- Batting average: .309
- Home runs: 16
- Runs batted in: 61

CPBL statistics (through 2022 season)
- Batting average: .232
- Home runs: 4
- Runs batted in: 21
- Stats at Baseball Reference

Teams
- Hiroshima Toyo Carp (2014–2015); Uni-President Lions (2022)
Medals
Men's baseball
Representing Mexico
Central American and Caribbean Games
Gold medal – first place	2023 San Salvador	Team

Rainel Rosario (born March 29, 1989) is a Dominican-Mexican professional baseball outfielder for the Conspiradores de Querétaro of the Mexican League. He has previously played in Nippon Professional Baseball (NPB) for the Hiroshima Toyo Carp, and in the Chinese Professional Baseball League (CPBL) for the Uni-President Lions.

== Career ==
=== St. Louis Cardinals ===
Rosario signed with the St. Louis Cardinals organization as an international free agent in 2006. He played the 2007 and 2008 seasons with the rookie-level Gulf Coast League Cardinals, batting .096 and .243 respectively. In 2009, Rosario played for the rookie-level Johnson City Cardinals, batting .272/.350/.408 in 36 contests. He split the 2010 season between the Low-A Batavia Muckdogs and the Single-A Quad Cities River Bandits, accumulating a .284/.387/.507 batting line in 64 games. He spent the next year with the High-A Palm Beach Cardinals, slashing .270/.333/.398 with 9 home runs and 70 RBI in 122 games. He split 2012 between Palm Beach and the Double-A Springfield Cardinals, batting .213/.282/.288 in 121 games between the clubs. On November 2, 2012, Rosario elected free agency.

=== Hiroshima Toyo Carp ===
Rosario played the 2014 and 2015 seasons in Japan for the Hiroshima Toyo Carp of Nippon Professional Baseball. In two seasons for Hiroshima, Rosario batted .309/.370/.503 with 16 home runs and 61 RBI.

=== Boston Red Sox ===
On December 12, 2015 he signed a minor league contract with the Boston Red Sox and was assigned to their Double-A affiliate, the Portland Sea Dogs, to start the 2016 season. He split the year between Portland and the Triple-A Pawtucket Red Sox, batting .248 in 103 games between the two clubs before electing free agency on November 7, 2016.

=== Saraperos de Saltillo ===
On March 30, 2017, Rosario signed with the Saraperos de Saltillo of the Mexican League. In 2017, Rosario batted a stellar .331/.406/.472 with 26 home runs and 104 RBI in 108 games. He played the entire 2018 season with the Saraperos, hitting 10 home runs with 50 RBI. In 2019, Rosario played in 114 games for Saltillo, slashing .324/.407/.569 with 28 home runs and 91 RBI. Rosario did not play in a game in 2020 due to the cancellation of the Mexican League season because of the COVID-19 pandemic.

=== Uni-President 7-Eleven Lions ===
On August 12, 2022, Rosario signed with the Uni-President 7-Eleven Lions of the Chinese Professional Baseball League. He played in 35 games for the Lions, batting .232/.296/.370 with 4 home runs and 21 RBI.

=== Saraperos de Saltillo (second stint) ===
On March 16, 2023, Rosario signed with the Saraperos de Saltillo of the Mexican League. On June 18, Rosario beat his teammate, Fernando Villegas, to win the 2023 Home Run Derby. For the season, he batted .331/.429/.581 with 17 home runs and 49 RBI. Rosario returned in 2024, hitting .261/.335/.376 with four home runs and 19 RBI across 40 games.

=== Bravos de León ===
On June 14, 2024, Rosario and Henry Urrutia were traded to the Bravos de León of the Mexican League in exchange for infielders Keven Lamas and Alejandro Mejía. In 37 appearances for León, he batted .328/.445/.552 with seven home runs and 28 RBI.

Rosario returned to León for a second season in 2025, he played in eight games slashing .333/.438/.630 with one home run and five RBI.

=== Dorados de Chihuahua ===
On April 29, 2025, Rosario was loaned to the Dorados de Chihuahua for the remainder of the season. In 61 games for Chihuahua, Rosario batted .266/.419/.413 with seven home runs, 28 RBI, and one stolen base. Rosario was returned to León following the season.

=== Conspiradores de Querétaro ===
On March 3, 2026, Rosario was loaned to the Conspiradores de Querétaro of the Mexican League for the 2026 season.

== International career ==
In June 2023, Rosario represented Mexico at the 2023 Central American and Caribbean Games, where the team won the gold medal.
