= Eduardo Paredes =

Venezuelan baseball player (born 1995)

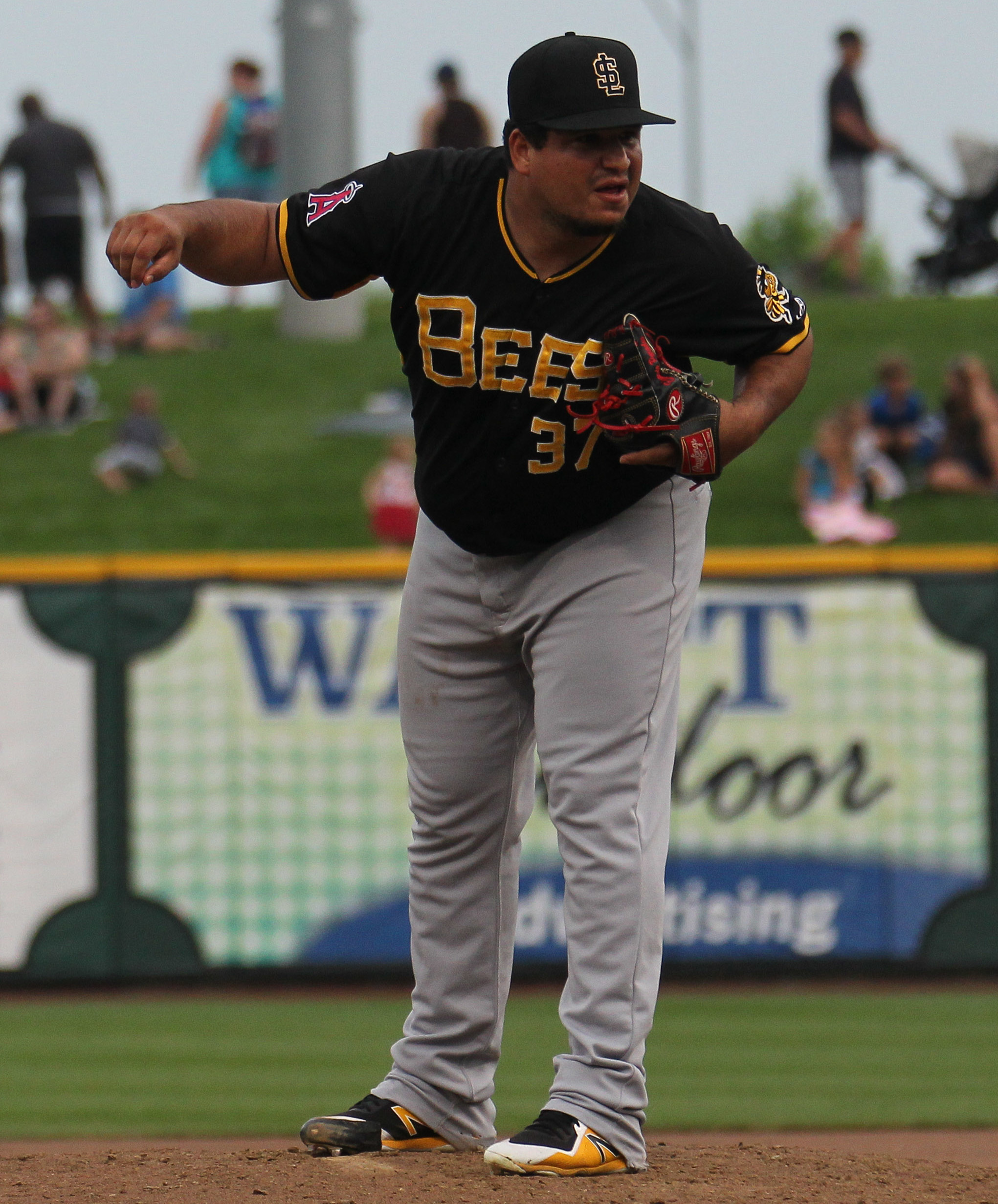
- Paredes with the Salt Lake Bees in 2018

Free agent
- Pitcher
- Born: March 6, 1995 (age 31); Valera, Trujillo, Venezuela
- Bats: Right Throws: Right

MLB debut
- June 23, 2017, for the Los Angeles Angels

MLB statistics (through 2018 season)
- Win–loss record: 0–1
- Earned run average: 5.53
- Strikeouts: 32
- Stats at Baseball Reference

Teams
- Los Angeles Angels (2017–2018)
Medals
Men's baseball
Representing Venezuela
Central American and Caribbean Games
Bronze medal – third place	2023 San Salvador	Team

Eduardo José Paredes Durán (born March 6, 1995) is a Venezuelan professional baseball pitcher who is a free agent. He has previously played in Major League Baseball (MLB) for the Los Angeles Angels.

== Career ==
=== Los Angeles Angels ===
Paredes signed with the Los Angeles Angels as an international free agent on March 12, 2012. He made his professional debut for the DSL Angels, and played for the club in the 2012 and 2013 seasons, recording a cumulative 2.05 ERA with 59 strikeouts. He spent the 2014 season with the rookie ball Orem Owlz, registering a 1.33 ERA with 31 strikeouts in 19 appearances. He split 2015 between the Single-A Burlington Bees and the High-A Inland Empire 66ers, pitching to a cumulative 2.44 ERA with 72 strikeouts in 48 games. He split the 2016 season between Inland Empire and the Double-A Arkansas Travelers, pitching to a 3.33 ERA in 70.1 innings of work.

The Angels added him to their 40-man roster after the 2016 season. Paredes started 2017 with the Mobile BayBears. He was called up to the Salt Lake Bees on May 3, and later to the Angels on June 23. Paredes made his MLB debut the same day, allowing 2 runs on 2 hits in 2 2/3 innings of work against the Boston Red Sox. In 18 games for the Angels, Paredes struck out 17 and allowed 11 earned runs. In 2018 for Los Angeles, Paredes appeared in 14 games, but allowed 14 runs in 18.1 innings, and spent the majority of the season in Triple-A with the Salt Lake Bees. One highlight of his MLB career came on September 5, 2017. In an Angels extra inning victory over the Athletics, Paredes pitched a scoreless 10th inning to preserve the Angles 8-7 victory. It was the only save of Paredes career.

He elected free agency on November 2, 2018 after being outrighted off of the 40-man roster.

=== Detroit Tigers ===
On December 13, 2018, Paredes signed a minor league deal with the Detroit Tigers. He was released on April 24, 2019.

=== Kansas City T-Bones ===
On June 1, 2019, Paredes signed with the Kansas City T-Bones of the independent American Association. He was released on August 17, 2019.

=== Generales de Durango ===
On February 10, 2021, Paredes signed with the Generales de Durango of the Mexican League. Paredes struggled to a 12.71 ERA across six appearances before being released on June 4.

=== Rieleros de Aguascalientes ===
On April 30, 2026, Paredes signed with the Rieleros de Aguascalientes of the Mexican League. In 24 relief appearances for the team, he posted a 2–0 record with a 3.80 ERA, 12 strikeouts, and 12 walks across 21 1/3 innings pitched. On July 8, Paredes was released by Aguascalientes.
