= Arturo López =

Mexican baseball player (born 1983)

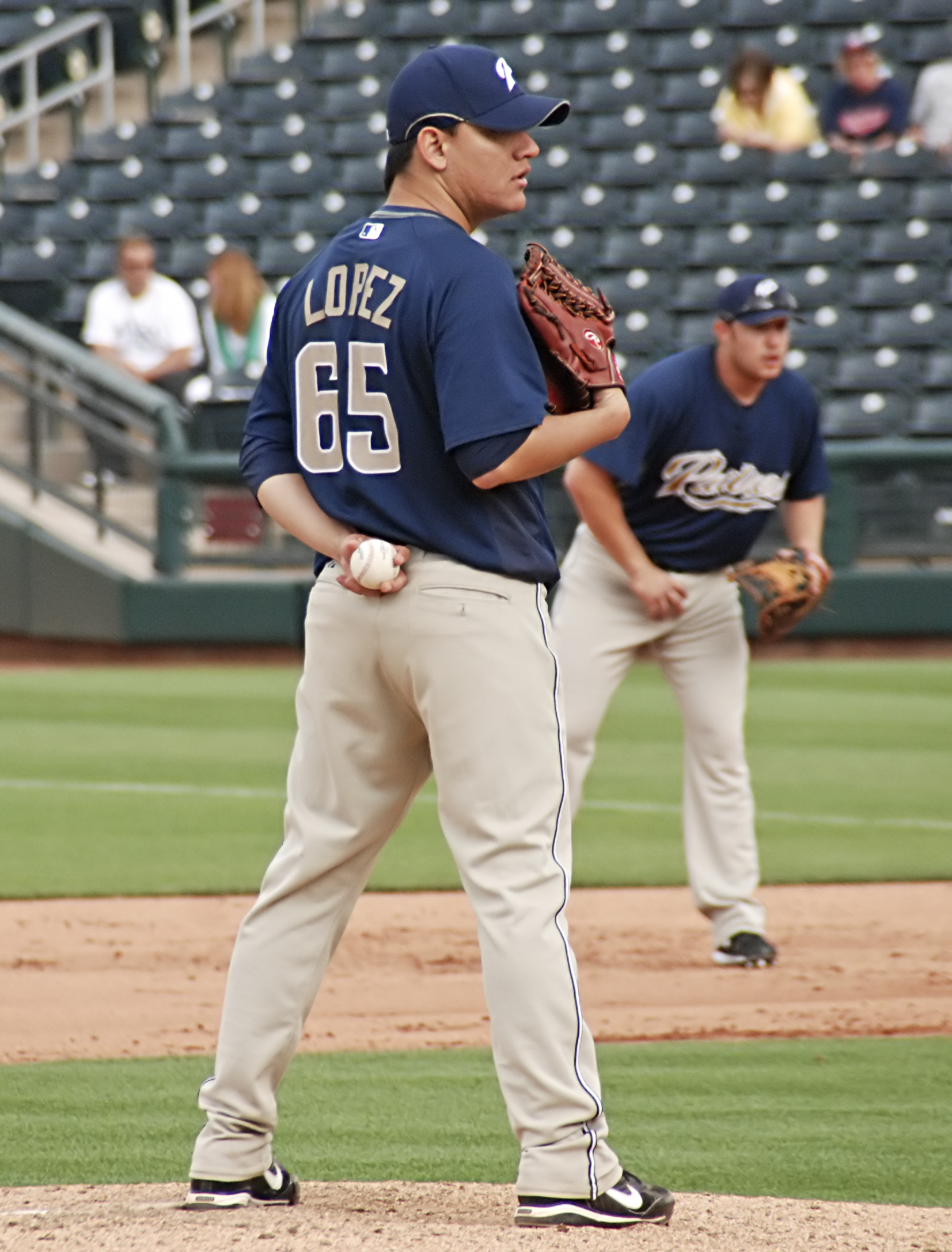
- López with the San Diego Padres
- Pitcher
- Born: February 22, 1983 (age 43); Culiacán, Sinaloa, Mexico
- Batted: Left Threw: Left

MLB debut
- April 29, 2009, for the San Diego Padres

Last MLB appearance
- May 10, 2009, for the San Diego Padres

MLB statistics
- Win–loss record: 0–0
- Earned run average: 19.29
- Strikeouts: 0
- Stats at Baseball Reference

Teams
- San Diego Padres (2009)
Medals
Men's baseball
Representing Mexico
Central American and Caribbean Games
Gold medal – first place	2023 San Salvador	Team
Pan American Games
Bronze medal – third place	2023 Santiago	Team

Javier Arturo López (born February 22, 1983) is a Mexican former professional baseball pitcher. He played in Major League Baseball (MLB) for the San Diego Padres.

== Career ==
=== Los Angeles Dodgers ===
López signed with the Los Angeles Dodgers as an international free agent on February 12, 2001. He made his professional debut with the rookie ball Gulf Coast League Dodgers, recording a 5–1 record and 2.04 ERA in 14 appearances. He split the 2002 season between the rookie ball Great Falls Dodgers and the High-A Vero Beach Dodgers, accumulating a 7–3 record and 3.87 ERA between the two clubs. He split 2003 between the Single-A South Georgia Waves and Vero Beach, registering a 7.33 ERA in 31 games. In 2004, López played for the Single-A Columbus Catfish, recording a 5–4 record and 4.76 ERA with 83 strikeouts in 29 appearances.

=== San Diego Padres ===
On December 13, 2004, López was selected by the San Diego Padres in the minor league phase of the Rule 5 draft. He spent the 2005 season with the High-A Lake Elsinore Storm, pitching to a 5–11 record and 5.85 ERA in 27 appearances. In 2006, López split the year between Lake Elsinore and the Double-A Mobile BayBears, and also appeared in 21 games for the Diablos Rojos del México of the Mexican League, but struggled to a 9.49 ERA. He spent the majority of the 2007 season with the Double-A San Antonio Missions, notching a 4.54 ERA, and also recorded a 5.71 ERA in 9 games for the Diablos. He played in 3 games for the Triple-A Portland Beavers in 2008, spending the rest of the season with the Diablos, notching a 9–3 record and 3.45 ERA in 16 appearances. From 2001 to 2008 in the minors, Lopez had a 38–39 record with a 5.15 ERA.

López was invited to Spring Training with the Padres for the 2009 season. He did not make the club and was assigned to Triple-A Portland to begin the season. On April 28, 2009, López was selected to the 40-man roster and promoted to the major leagues for the first time. He made his major league debut on April 29, against the Colorado Rockies. López allowed 5 runs in 2 1/3 innings for the Padres without striking anybody out before being optioned to Triple-A on May 11.

=== New York Mets ===
On June 19, 2009, López was claimed off waivers by the New York Mets. He did not play for the Mets in 2009, and spent the remainder of the year in Triple-A with the Buffalo Bisons, where he recorded a 3.86 ERA in 15 games.

On February 24, 2010, López was designated for assignment by the Mets following the signing of Rod Barajas. He cleared waivers two days later and was invited to Spring Training as a non-roster invitee. He did not play in a game in 2010, and spent the 2011 season on loan to the Diablos Rojos del México, struggling to a 12.33 ERA in 10 games. In 2012 for Mexico, López recorded a 6–7 record and 6.44 ERA in 37 appearances.

=== San Diego Padres (second stint) ===
On January 29, 2013, López signed a minor league contract with the San Diego Padres organization. On March 24, López was loaned to the Diablos Rojos del Mexico of the Mexican League, the team with whom he played for in 2011. On August 21, López was re-acquired by the Padres, and spent the remainder of the year with the Triple-A Tucson Padres. On December 13, López was released by the Padres.

=== Diablos Rojos del México ===
On March 29, 2014, López re-joined the Diablos Rojos del México of the Mexican League. López recorded an 11–4 record and 4.13 ERA with 95 strikeouts in 24 games on the season. In 22 starts for the team in 2015, López pitched to a 8–4 record and 5.34 ERA with 74 strikeouts across 111 1/3 innings pitched. The next year, López made another 22 starts, struggling to a 4–11 record and 6.17 ERA with 66 strikeouts across 109 1/3 innings pitched. In 2017, he recorded a 7–7 record and 5.43 ERA with 55 strikeouts over 21 starts.

On February 12, 2018, López was traded to the Guerreros de Oaxaca alongside Carlos Morales, Filiberto Baez, Javier Rodriguez, Jose Augusto Figueroa, and Luis Alfonso Garcia. However, he did not play for Oaxaca, and was reassigned to the Diablos on July 4.

López pitched primarily out of the bullpen for the club in 2018, and recorded a 2.84 ERA with five strikeouts in 12 2/3 innings across 14 games. In 2019, he recorded a 6–4 record and 5.48 ERA with 71 strikeouts over 22 starts. In 2020, López did not play a game because of the cancellation of the Mexican League season due to the COVID-19 pandemic.

López made one scoreless start for the Diablos in 2024, striking out one batter over three innings of work. With the team, he won the Serie del Rey. López retired on April 17, 2025, following the season opener against the Leones de Yucatán.

== International career ==
In June 2023, López represented Mexico at the 2023 Central American and Caribbean Games, where the team won the gold medal.

López was part of the Mexican squad that won the bronze medal at the 2023 Pan American Games contested in Santiago, Chile in October 2023.

== See also ==
- Rule 5 draft results
