= Norberto Obeso =

Mexican baseball player (born 1995)

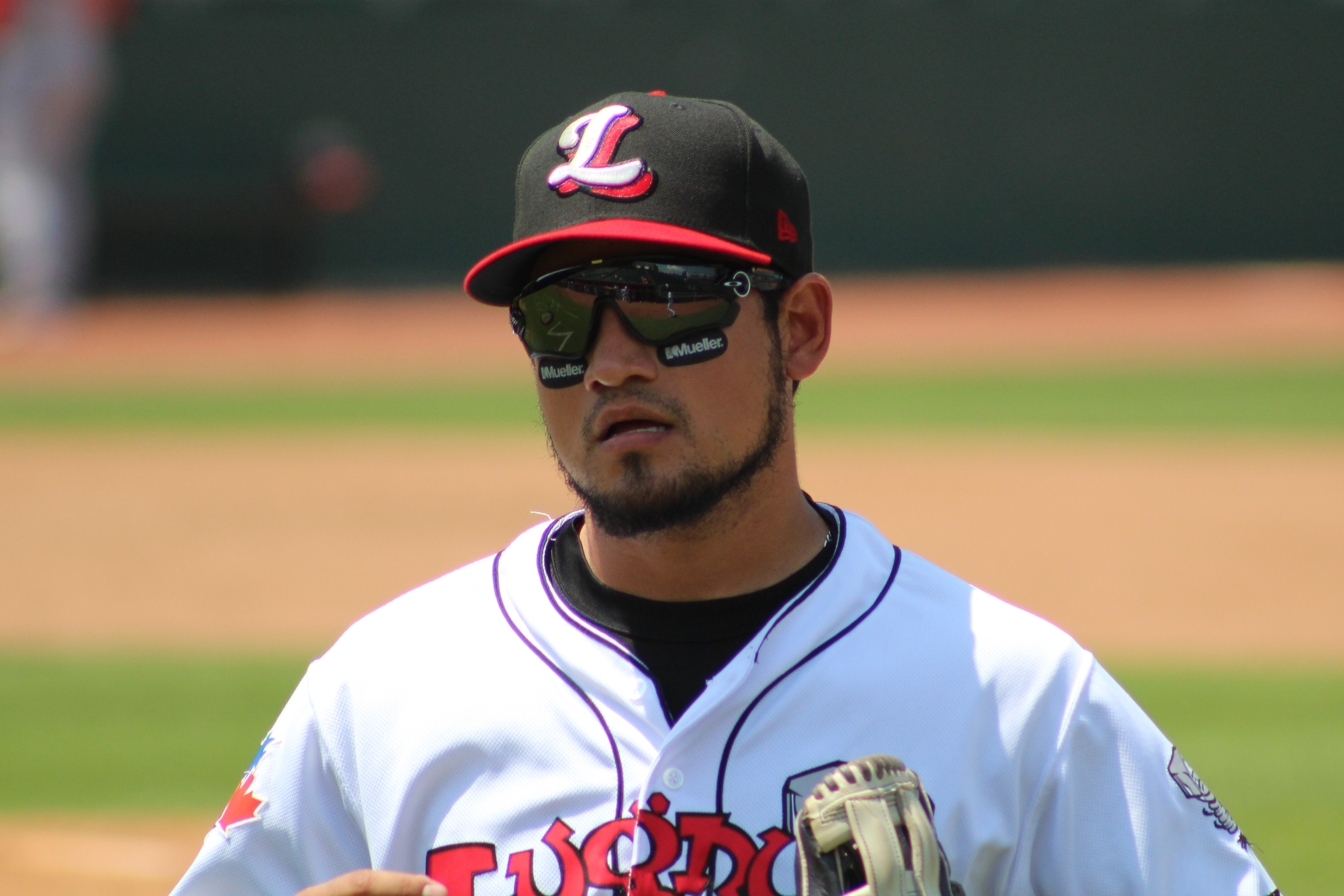
- Obeso in 2018

Leones de Yucatán – No. 9
- Outfielder
- Born: 9 July 1995 (age 30); Hermosillo, Sonora, Mexico
- Bats: Left Throws: Right
Medals
Men's baseball
Representing Mexico
U-23 Baseball World Cup
Gold medal – first place	2018 Barranquilla	Team
Central American and Caribbean Games
Gold medal – first place	2023 San Salvador	Team
Pan American Games
Bronze medal – third place	2023 Santiago	Team

Norberto Obeso González (born 9 July 1995) is a Mexican professional baseball outfielder for the Leones de Yucatán of the Mexican League. Obeso played in the minor leagues for the Toronto Blue Jays organization and has represented Mexico at the 2018 U-23 Baseball World Cup, 2023 Central American and Caribbean Games and 2023 Pan American Games.

== Professional career ==
=== Early career ===
Obeso was born on 9 July 1995 in Hermosillo, Sonora and made his professional debut in the Mexican Pacific League during the 2014–15 season, for his hometown team, the Naranjeros de Hermosillo, playing only one game for the Naranjeros.

=== Toronto Blue Jays ===
On September 12, 2013, Obeso signed with the Toronto Blue Jays as an international free agent. He was assigned to the Dominican Summer League Blue Jays to make his professional debut in 2015, where he finished the season with a .351 batting average and 47 RBI and won the Webster Award, a recognition for the best Blue Jays minor league players and made it to the DSL All-Star team. The next season, Obeso played for the rookie–level Gulf Coast League Blue Jays, finishing the year with a .316 batting average, one home run and 18 RBI.

In 2017, Obeso was promoted to the Low–A Vancouver Canadians of the Northwest League. He finished the season with a .252 average, two home runs and 23 RBI. In 2018, he played for the Lansing Lugnuts of the Single–A Midwest League, recording a .227 average, three home runs and 37 RBI. In 2019, Obeso played for the Dunedin Blue Jays of the High–A Florida State League, finishing the season with a .262 batting average, one home run and 32 RBI in 82 games.

On 19 November 2019, Obeso was assigned to the Triple–A Buffalo Bisons and on 9 March 2020 he was assigned to the Double–A New Hampshire Fisher Cats. He did not play in a game in 2020 due to the cancellation of the minor league season because of the COVID-19 pandemic. On 2 November 2020, Obeso elected free agency.

=== Leones de Yucatán ===
On 3 February 2021, Obeso joined the Leones de Yucatán of the Mexican League, ahead of the 2021 season. He finished the 2021 season with a .243 batting average, two home runs and 20 RBI. Obeso won the 2022 Mexican League championship, recording a .316 batting average, one home run and 23 RBI in 68 games.

=== Mexican Pacific League ===
Obeso has played for the Naranjeros de Hermosillo and Águilas de Mexicali of the Mexican Pacific League. He debuted and played for the Naranjeros from 2014 to 2022, when he was traded to the Águilas de Mexicali in exchange for Isaac Paredes. Obeso officially joined the Águilas on 13 November 2022 and has since played for the Mexicali squad.

== International career ==
In 2018, Obeso was selected as part of the Mexican squad that competed in the 2018 U-23 Baseball World Cup held in Barranquilla, Colombia. Mexico won the gold medal, defeating Japan 2–1 in the final game. Obeso won the tournament's Leading Hitter award, with a .591 batting average, and was named to the championship's All-World Team. That same year, Obeso was awarded as the Professional Baseball Player of the Year by the Mexican Baseball Federation.

In June 2023, Obeso was selected to represent Mexico at the 2023 Central American and Caribbean Games, where the team won the gold medal. Later, in October 2023, he was part of the Mexican team that won the bronze medal at the 2023 Pan American Games contested in Santiago, Chile. He played six games, batting .250 with one RBI.
