= Guillermo Avilés =

Cuban baseball player (born 1993)

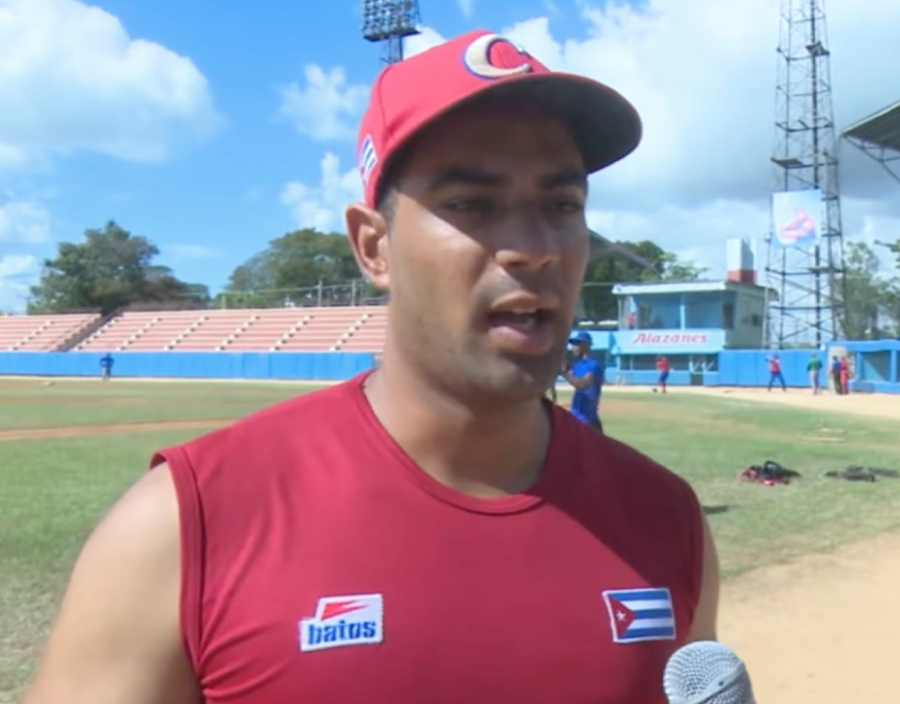
- Avilés in 2018

Alazanes de Granma
- First baseman / Leftfielder
- Born: 20 January 1993 (age 33); Bayamo, Granma Province, Cuba
- Bats: Left Throws: Left
- Stats at Baseball Reference
Medals
Men's baseball
Representing Cuba
Central American and Caribbean Games
Silver medal – second place	2018 Barranquilla	Team
Silver medal – second place	2023 San Salvador	Team

Guillermo José Avilés Difurnó (born 20 January 1993) is a Cuban professional baseball first baseman and leftfielder for Alazanes de Granma in the Cuban National Series.

Avilés was born on 20 January 1993 in Bayamo, Granma Province. He played for the Cuba national baseball team at the 2009 World Youth Baseball Championship, 2010 World Junior Baseball Championship, and 2017 World Baseball Classic.
