= Curaçao National Championship AA League =

Professional baseball league in Curaçao

- Sport: Baseball
- Founded: 1975
- No. of teams: 7
- Country: Curaçao
- Most recent champion: Royal Scorpions (2023)
- Most titles: WildCats KJ74 (17 titles)
- Related competitions: Caribbean Series

The Curaçao National Championship AA League (Papiamento: Kampionato di Beisbòl Klase AA di Kòrsou), formerly referred to as Liga Amstel Bright and commonly known as the AA League (Liga Dòbel A), is a baseball summer league in Curaçao. Part of the Curaçao Baseball Federation (Federashon Beisbol Kòrsou, or FEBEKO), the AA League was the top-level baseball league in Curaçao from its foundation until 2023, when the Curaçao Professional Baseball League (CPB) was formed.

The seven-team league plays a season that ends in October, with all games played at two stadiums, Stadion Johnny Vrutaal and Tio Daou Ballpark, in the capital of Willemstad. In 2023, the league's champion was invited to participate in the Caribbean Series. The champion, Wildcats KJ74, featured Curaçaoan-born major leaguers like Andrelton Simmons and Jonathan Schoop.

== Current teams ==
Team	Founded
Firebirds	
Groot Kwartier Stars	1975
Marchena Braves	
Royal Scorpions	1975
Santa Maria Pirates	1975
Santa Rosa Indians	1975
Wildcats KJ74	1975
