= Jasson Atondo =

Mexican baseball player (born 1995)

Olmecas de Tabasco – No. 7
- Infielder
- Born: 27 August 1995 (age 30); El Colorado, Sinaloa, Mexico
- Bats: Right Throws: Right
Medals
Men's baseball
Representing Mexico
Central American and Caribbean Games
Gold medal – first place	2023 San Salvador	Team
Pan American Games
Bronze medal – third place	2023 Santiago	Team

Jasson Abelardo Atondo Diarte (born 27 August 1995) is a Mexican professional baseball infielder for the Olmecas de Tabasco of the Mexican League. He has represented Mexico at the 2023 Central American and Caribbean Games and 2023 Pan American Games, where he won gold and bronze medals respectively.

== Early career ==
Atondo was born on 27 August 1995 in the town of El Colorado, in the Ahome municipality of Sinaloa. In 2012, he was signed by the Piratas de Campeche of the Mexican League (LMB). In 2014, he became the batting champion of the Mexican League academy tournament, finishing the season with a .404 batting average. In October 2014, he was promoted to the Pureros de Compostela of the Liga Noroeste (Northwestern League), a minor league affiliate of the Piratas.

== Professional career ==
=== Piratas de Campeche ===
In 2015, Atondo was invited to the Piratas de Campeche spring training in Tucson, Arizona, and made the final roster, making his Mexican League (LMB) debut on 4 April against the Delfines del Carmen. He started the game as the designated hitter, recording two hits against pitcher Mario González. In his debut season, he appeared in 49 games, batting .277/.319/.348 with 31 hits and nine RBI over 112 at bats.

=== Diablos Rojos del México ===
On 5 July 2022, Atondo joined the Diablos Rojos del México of the LMB. He appeared in 19 games, hitting .364/.438/.509 with 20 hits, one home run and 11 RBI over 55 at-bats.

=== Olmecas de Tabasco ===
On 23 March 2023, Atondo signed with the Olmecas de Tabasco of the Mexican League.

=== Naranjeros de Hermosillo ===
In 2014, Atondo was drafted by the Naranjeros de Hermosillo of the Mexican Pacific League (LMP). He made his LMP debut during the 2015–16 season. He won the 2018–19 Rookie of the Year Award; despite having played for four seasons, he had not reached 100 at-bats at the beginning of the season.

He won the 2024–25 season batting title, hitting .355 in his tenth season with the Naranjeros.

== International career ==
In June 2023, Atondo was selected to represent Mexico at the 2023 Central American and Caribbean Games, where the team won the gold medal. Later, in October 2023, he was part of the Mexican team that won the bronze medal at the 2023 Pan American Games contested in Santiago, Chile. He appeared in four games, scoring three runs, batting .615 with eight hits and five RBI over 13 at bats.
