= Moisés Gutiérrez =

Mexican baseball player (born 1994)

Diablos Rojos del México – No. 61
- Infielder
- Born: 19 November 1994 (age 31); San Luis Potosí, San Luis Potosí, Mexico
- Bats: Switch Throws: Right

Career highlights and awards
- Hit for the cycle on 10 July 2019
Medals
Men's baseball
Representing Mexico
Central American and Caribbean Games
Gold medal – first place	2023 San Salvador	Team
Pan American Games
Bronze medal – third place	2023 Santiago	Team

Moisés Gutiérrez Molgado (born 19 November 1994), nicknamed "Mollete" (Note: A mollete is an open-faced sandwich with refried beans and white cheese in Mexican cuisine.), is a Mexican professional baseball infielder for the Diablos Rojos del México of the Mexican League. Gutiérrez has represented Mexico at the 2023 Central American and Caribbean Games and 2023 Pan American Games, winning a gold and bronze medal respectively.

== Career ==
=== Sultanes de Monterrey ===
Gutiérrez was born on 19 November 1994 in the Barrio de San Miguelito in the city of San Luis Potosí. After a tryout in Aguascalientes held by the Sultanes de Monterrey, he was signed by the club and joined the Academia de Béisbol de El Carmen (El Carmen Baseball Academy), owned by the Sultanes. He made his professional debut in the Mexican League in 2011, aged 16; however, after appearing only in two games in the season with the Fantasmas Grises, he was sent back to the Academia de Béisbol de El Carmen.

In 2014, Gutiérrez rejoined to the Sultanes first team, appearing in 47 games and batting .246/.290/.262 with five RBI.

=== Broncos de Reynosa ===
On 24 May 2016, Gutiérrez was traded to the Broncos de Reynosa. In 62 appearances for Reynosa, Gutiérrez slashed .270/.311/.354 with two home runs, 17 RBI, and four stolen bases.

=== Sultanes de Monterrey (second stint) ===
On 19 September 2016, Gutiérrez was returned to the Sultanes de Monterrey. He made 65 appearances for the team during the 2017 season, hitting .279/.333/.424 with five home runs and 31 RBI. Gutiérrez played in 13 games for the Sultanes in 2018, going 4-for-23 (.174) with two RBI.

=== Generales de Durango ===
On 1 May 2018, Gutiérrez was transferred to the Generales de Durango. On 10 July 2019, while playing for the Generales, he hit for the cycle in Durango's win against the Olmecas de Tabasco 13–11.

=== Diablos Rojos del México ===
On 9 December 2021, Gutiérrez was traded to the Diablos Rojos del México, where he has mostly played as second baseman.

Gutiérrez made 55 appearances for México during the 2024 season, slashing .310/.377/.555 with eight home runs, 42 RBI, and one stolen base. With the Diablos in 2024, he won the Serie del Rey.

Gutiérrez played in 59 games for the Diablos in 2025, batting .313/.365/.455 with four home runs, 32 RBI, and five stolen bases. With the team, he won his second consecutive Serie del Rey.

== International career ==
Gutiérrez was selected to represent Mexico at the 2023 Central American and Caribbean Games, where the team won the gold medal. He played all the games, recording one run, four hits and one RBI in 17 at bats for a .235 batting average.

He was part of the Mexican squad that won the bronze medal at the 2023 Pan American Games contested in Santiago, Chile in October 2023, appearing in six games.

== Notes ==
Achievements
Preceded by Jon del Campo	Hitting for the cycle in the Mexican League; 10 July 2019	Succeeded by Edson García
