= Edson García (baseball) =

Mexican baseball player (born 1992)

Toros de Tijuana – No. 99
- Infielder
- Born: 11 September 1992 (age 33); Chipilo, Puebla, Mexico
- Bats: Switch Throws: Right

LMB statistics (through 2025 season)
- Batting average: .253
- Hits: 628
- Home runs: 50
- Runs batted in: 301
- Stolen bases: 53

Teams
- Tigres de Quintana Roo (2012); Leones de Yucatán (2013-2017); Rieleros de Aguascalientes (2017-2019); Toros de Tijuana (2021); Rieleros de Aguascalientes (2022); Acereros de Monclova (2023); Rieleros de Aguascalientes (2024); Tigres de Quintana Roo (2024); Toros de Tijuana (2025-present)

Career highlights and awards
- LMB: Hit for the cycle on 10 August 2019
Medals
Men's baseball
Representing Mexico
Central American and Caribbean Games
Gold medal – first place	2023 San Salvador	Team
Pan American Games
Bronze medal – third place	2023 Santiago	Team

Edson Daniel García Bejarano (born 11 September 1992) is a Mexican professional baseball infielder for the Toros de Tijuana of the Mexican League. García has represented Mexico at the 2023 Central American and Caribbean Games and 2023 Pan American Games, winning a gold and bronze medal respectively.

== Early life ==
García was born on 11 September 1992 in Chipilo, Puebla. He played amateur baseball in the Liga Zaragoza (Zaragoza League) of the city of Puebla with his brother Miguel, who had a brief professional career playing in 2012 for the Petroleros de Minatitlán.

== Professional career ==
=== Tigres de la Angelópolis / Tigres de Quintana Roo ===
When García was 14 years old, he was signed as a prospect by the Tigres de la Angelópolis; the next year, the team moved to Cancún and adopted its current name, Tigres de Quintana Roo. He made his professional debut in 2012 with the Tigres.

=== Leones de Yucatán ===
On May 6, 2013, García was signed by the Leones de Yucatán of the Mexican League.

=== Toros de Tijuana ===
On January 20, 2016, García was loaned to the Toros de Tijuana of the Mexican League.

=== Rieleros de Aguascalientes ===
On April 10, 2017, just one month into the season, García was transferred to the Rieleros de Aguascalientes of the Mexican League. On 10 August 2019, he hit for the cycle in the Rieleros' victory 24–2 against the Generales de Durango.

=== Toros de Tijuana (second stint) ===
On May 20, 2021 García joined the Toros de Tijuana for a second stint. He played in 39 games for Tijuana, batting .146/.170/.169 with seven RBI and two stolen bases. With Tijuana in 2021, García won the Serie del Rey.

=== Rieleros de Aguascalientes ===
On April 21, 2022, García signed with the Rieleros de Aguascalientes. In 85 appearances for Aguascalientes, García batted .303/.380/.449 with 10 home runs, 51 RBI, and three stolen bases.

=== Acereros de Monclova ===
On January 20, 2023, García was traded to the Acereros de Monclova. In 58 appearances for Monclova, García slashed .269/.323/.363 with three home runs, 25 RBI, and six stolen bases.

=== Rieleros de Aguascalientes (third stint) ===
On April 11, 2024, García was traded back to the Rieleros de Aguascalientes. He went hitless in three at-bats across three games for Aguascalientes.

=== Tigres de Quintana Roo (second stint) ===
On 28 April 2024, García was loaned to the Tigres de Quintana Roo. In 67 appearances for Quintana Roo, García batted .265/.313/.408 with seven home runs, 27 RBI, and six stolen bases.

=== Toros de Tijuana (third stint) ===
On 7 May 2025, García signed with the Toros de Tijuana of the Mexican League.

== International career ==
García has also played winter league baseball in the Mexican Pacific League since 2014 when he made his debut with the Charros de Jalisco and currently playing for the Sultanes de Monterrey. He was also a member of the Venados de Mazatlán and Yaquis de Obregón. He reached 400 hits in the Mexican Pacific League during the 2004–25 season.

García was selected to represent Mexico at the 2023 Central American and Caribbean Games, where the team won the gold medal. He played in three games recording two hits and one run in four at bats for a .500 batting average.

He was part of the Mexican squad that won the bronze medal at the 2023 Pan American Games contested in Santiago, Chile in October 2023, where he played in three games.

Achievements
Preceded by Moisés Gutiérrez	Hitting for the cycle in the Mexican League; 10 August 2019	Succeeded by Alexi Amarista
