= Baseball at the 2023 Central American and Caribbean Games =

- Venue: Parque Nacional de Pelota Saturnino Bengoa
- Location: San Salvador
- Dates: 24 June – 1 July
- Competitors: 192 from 8 nations
- Teams: 8

Medalists
gold medal	Mexico
silver medal	Cuba
bronze medal	Venezuela

The baseball competition at the 2023 Central American and Caribbean Games was held at the Parque Nacional de Pelota Saturnino Bengoa in San Salvador, El Salvador from 25 June to 1 July 2023.

The top three teams qualify to the 2023 Pan American Games.

== Participating nations ==
A total of eight countries qualified athletes. The number of athletes a nation entered is in parentheses beside the name of the country.

- Cuba (24)
- Curaçao (24)
- Dominican Republic (24)
- El Salvador (24)
- Mexico (24)
- Nicaragua (24)
- Puerto Rico (24)
- Venezuela (24)

== Medal table ==
* Host nation (El Salvador)

Rank	Nation	Gold	Silver	Bronze	Total
1	Mexico (MEX)	1	0	0	1
2	Cuba (CUB)	0	1	0	1
3	Venezuela (VEN)	0	0	1	1
Totals (3 entries)		1	1	1	3

== Medal summary ==
Event	Gold	Silver	Bronze
Men’s tournament	Mexico; Jasson Atondo; Emmanuel Ávila; Faustino Carrera; Fabián Cota; Fernando Flores; Edson García; David Gutiérrez; Moisés Gutiérrez; Francisco Haro; Arturo López; Víctor Mendoza; Luis Miranda; Aldo Montes; Héctor Mora; Carlos Morales; Yoanner Negrín; Norberto Obeso; Wilmer Ríos; Randy Romero; Rainel Rosario; Alexandro Tovalín; Fernando Villegas; Alexis Wilson; Samuel Zazueta	Cuba; Erisbel Arruebarrena; Guillermo Avilés; Jonathan Carbó; Naikel Cruz; Dayán García; Yasniel González; Yurisbel Gracial; Yoelkis Guibert; Andrés Hernández; Yunior Ibarra; Javier Mirabal; Yordan Manduley; Luis Vicente Mateo; Yadil Mujica; Miguel Neira; Andrys Pérez; Franky Quintana; Yeudis Reyes; Renner Rivero; José Ramón Rodríguez; Raico Santos; Roel Santos; Carlos Viera; Yoennis Yera	Venezuela; Oscar Abreu; Iván Andueza; Derwin Barreto; Michael Chirinos; Carlos Chourio; José García; Dannys Hernández; Juan Infante; Junnell Ledezma; Ángel León; José Martínez; Anderson Meléndez; Alex Monsalve; César Ortega; José Ortega; Jonel Pacheco; Eduardo Paredes; Sebastián Perrone; Yoandy Rea; Wuilder Rodríguez; Brayan Salaya; Carlos Valero; Sonny Vargas; Wuilman Velásquez

== First round ==
=== Standings ===
Pos	Team	Pld	W	L	RF	RA	RD	PCT	GB	Qualification
1	Mexico	6	5	1	33	11	+22	.833	—	Advance to Gold medal game
2	Cuba	7	5	2	54	17	+37	.714	0.5	Advance to Gold medal game
3	Dominican Republic	6	4	2	30	26	+4	.667	1	Advance to Bronze medal game
4	Venezuela	7	4	3	25	35	−10	.571	1.5	Advance to Bronze medal game
5	Curaçao	6	3	3	26	29	−3	.500	2	
6	Nicaragua	6	2	4	17	31	−14	.333	3	
7	Puerto Rico	5	1	4	15	19	−4	.200	3.5	
8	El Salvador (H)	5	0	5	9	41	−32	.000	4.5	

Source: San Salvador 2023 – XXIV Juegos Centroamericanos y del Caribe
(H) Hosts

=== Results ===
24 June 2023; 9:30 (UTC–6)	Mexico	4–0	Cuba	Parque Nacional de Pelota Saturnino Bengoa, San Salvador
24 June 2023; 9:30 (UTC–6)		Boxscore		Parque Nacional de Pelota Saturnino Bengoa, San Salvador

24 June 2023; 13:00 (UTC–6)	Puerto Rico	3–4	Venezuela	Parque Nacional de Pelota Saturnino Bengoa, San Salvador
24 June 2023; 13:00 (UTC–6)		Boxscore		Parque Nacional de Pelota Saturnino Bengoa, San Salvador

24 June 2023; 16:30 (UTC–6)	Dominican Republic	6–5 (F/8)	Nicaragua	Parque Nacional de Pelota Saturnino Bengoa, San Salvador
24 June 2023; 16:30 (UTC–6)		Boxscore		Parque Nacional de Pelota Saturnino Bengoa, San Salvador

24 June 2023; 20:00 (UTC–6)	Curaçao	12–4	El Salvador	Parque Nacional de Pelota Saturnino Bengoa, San Salvador
24 June 2023; 20:00 (UTC–6)		Boxscore		Parque Nacional de Pelota Saturnino Bengoa, San Salvador

25 June 2023; 9:30 (UTC–6)	Venezuela	5–2	Dominican Republic	Parque Nacional de Pelota Saturnino Bengoa, San Salvador
25 June 2023; 9:30 (UTC–6)		Boxscore		Parque Nacional de Pelota Saturnino Bengoa, San Salvador

25 June 2023; 13:00 (UTC–6)	Cuba	4–2	Curaçao	Parque Nacional de Pelota Saturnino Bengoa, San Salvador
25 June 2023; 13:00 (UTC–6)		Boxscore		Parque Nacional de Pelota Saturnino Bengoa, San Salvador

25 June 2023; 16:30 (UTC–6)	Nicaragua	3–1	Puerto Rico	Parque Nacional de Pelota Saturnino Bengoa, San Salvador
25 June 2023; 16:30 (UTC–6)		Boxscore		Parque Nacional de Pelota Saturnino Bengoa, San Salvador

25 June 2023; 20:00 (UTC–6)	El Salvador	0–4	Mexico	Parque Nacional de Pelota Saturnino Bengoa, San Salvador
25 June 2023; 20:00 (UTC–6)		Boxscore		Parque Nacional de Pelota Saturnino Bengoa, San Salvador

26 June 2023; 9:30 (UTC–6)	Puerto Rico	Cancelled	Dominican Republic	Parque Nacional de Pelota Saturnino Bengoa, San Salvador
26 June 2023; 9:30 (UTC–6)		Boxscore		Parque Nacional de Pelota Saturnino Bengoa, San Salvador

26 June 2023; 13:00 (UTC–6)	Mexico	Cancelled	Curaçao	Parque Nacional de Pelota Saturnino Bengoa, San Salvador
26 June 2023; 13:00 (UTC–6)		Boxscore		Parque Nacional de Pelota Saturnino Bengoa, San Salvador

26 June 2023; 20:00 (UTC–6)	Nicaragua	Cancelled	El Salvador	Parque Nacional de Pelota Saturnino Bengoa, San Salvador
26 June 2023; 20:00 (UTC–6)		Boxscore		Parque Nacional de Pelota Saturnino Bengoa, San Salvador

27 June 2023; 14:30 (UTC–6)	Curaçao	4–3	Venezuela	Parque Nacional de Pelota Saturnino Bengoa, San Salvador
27 June 2023; 14:30 (UTC–6)		Boxscore		Parque Nacional de Pelota Saturnino Bengoa, San Salvador

27 June 2023; 17:30 (UTC–6)	Nicaragua	0–7	Mexico	Parque Nacional de Pelota Saturnino Bengoa, San Salvador
27 June 2023; 17:30 (UTC–6)		Boxscore		Parque Nacional de Pelota Saturnino Bengoa, San Salvador

27 June 2023; 20:30 (UTC–6)	Cuba	4–5 (F/8)	Puerto Rico	Parque Nacional de Pelota Saturnino Bengoa, San Salvador
27 June 2023; 20:30 (UTC–6)		Boxscore		Parque Nacional de Pelota Saturnino Bengoa, San Salvador

28 June 2023; 11:00 (UTC–6)	Puerto Rico	2–3	Curaçao	Parque Nacional de Pelota Saturnino Bengoa, San Salvador
28 June 2023; 11:00 (UTC–6)		Boxscore		Parque Nacional de Pelota Saturnino Bengoa, San Salvador

28 June 2023; 14:10 (UTC–6)	Venezuela	4–1	Nicaragua	Parque Nacional de Pelota Saturnino Bengoa, San Salvador
28 June 2023; 14:10 (UTC–6)		Boxscore		Parque Nacional de Pelota Saturnino Bengoa, San Salvador

28 June 2023; 17:10 (UTC–6)	Dominican Republic	6–2	Mexico	Parque Nacional de Pelota Saturnino Bengoa, San Salvador
28 June 2023; 17:10 (UTC–6)		Boxscore		Parque Nacional de Pelota Saturnino Bengoa, San Salvador

28 June 2023; 20:30 (UTC–6)	El Salvador	2–6	Dominican Republic	Parque Nacional de Pelota Saturnino Bengoa, San Salvador
28 June 2023; 20:30 (UTC–6)		Boxscore		Parque Nacional de Pelota Saturnino Bengoa, San Salvador

29 June 2023; 10:00 (UTC–6)	Cuba	15–0 (F/5)	El Salvador	Parque Nacional de Pelota Saturnino Bengoa, San Salvador
29 June 2023; 10:00 (UTC–6)		Boxscore		Parque Nacional de Pelota Saturnino Bengoa, San Salvador

29 June 2023; 13:00 (UTC–6)	Dominican Republic	0–12 (F/6)	Cuba	Parque Nacional de Pelota Saturnino Bengoa, San Salvador
29 June 2023; 13:00 (UTC–6)		Boxscore		Parque Nacional de Pelota Saturnino Bengoa, San Salvador

29 June 2023; 15:05 (UTC–6)	Puerto Rico	4–5	Mexico	Parque Nacional de Pelota Saturnino Bengoa, San Salvador
29 June 2023; 15:05 (UTC–6)		Boxscore		Parque Nacional de Pelota Saturnino Bengoa, San Salvador

29 June 2023; 18:00 (UTC–6)	Curaçao	5–6 (F/8)	Nicaragua	Parque Nacional de Pelota Saturnino Bengoa, San Salvador
29 June 2023; 18:00 (UTC–6)		Boxscore		Parque Nacional de Pelota Saturnino Bengoa, San Salvador

30 June 2023; 11:00 (UTC–6)	El Salvador	3–4 (F/8)	Venezuela	Parque Nacional de Pelota Saturnino Bengoa, San Salvador
30 June 2023; 11:00 (UTC–6)		Boxscore		Parque Nacional de Pelota Saturnino Bengoa, San Salvador

30 June 2023; 15:15 (UTC–6)	Nicaragua	2–8	Cuba	Parque Nacional de Pelota Saturnino Bengoa, San Salvador
30 June 2023; 15:15 (UTC–6)		Boxscore		Parque Nacional de Pelota Saturnino Bengoa, San Salvador

30 June 2023; 16:20 (UTC–6)	Curaçao	0–10 (F/6)	Dominican Republic	Parque Nacional de Pelota Saturnino Bengoa, San Salvador
30 June 2023; 16:20 (UTC–6)		Boxscore		Parque Nacional de Pelota Saturnino Bengoa, San Salvador

30 June 2023; 17:00 (UTC–6)	Mexico	11–1 (F/5)	Venezuela	Parque Nacional de Pelota Saturnino Bengoa, San Salvador
30 June 2023; 17:00 (UTC–6)		Boxscore		Parque Nacional de Pelota Saturnino Bengoa, San Salvador

30 June 2023; 19:30 (UTC–6)	El Salvador	Cancelled	Puerto Rico	Parque Nacional de Pelota Saturnino Bengoa, San Salvador
30 June 2023; 19:30 (UTC–6)		Boxscore		Parque Nacional de Pelota Saturnino Bengoa, San Salvador

1 July 2023; 10:00 (UTC–6)	Venezuela	4–11	Cuba	Parque Nacional de Pelota Saturnino Bengoa, San Salvador
1 July 2023; 10:00 (UTC–6)		Boxscore		Parque Nacional de Pelota Saturnino Bengoa, San Salvador

== Medal games ==
=== Bronze medal game ===
1 July 2023 13:30 at Parque Nacional de Pelota Saturnino Bengoa in San Salvador
Team	1	2	3	4	5	6	7	8	R	H	E
Dominican Republic	2	0	1	3	0	0	0	1	7	9	1
Venezuela	0	0	5	0	0	1	0	2	8	9	0
WP: Eduardo Paredes LP: Hansel Paulino; Home runs: DOM: Ricardo Céspedes (1), Adrián Valerio (1); VEN: None; Boxscore

=== Gold medal game ===
1 July 2023 at Parque Nacional de Pelota Saturnino Bengoa in San Salvador
Team
Cuba
Mexico
Notes: Game cancelled due to weather conditions. Mexico wins gold medal due to first round record.
Boxscore

== Statistical leaders ==
=== Batting ===
Statistic	Name	Total
Batting average	(Mexico) Fernando Villegas	.611
Hits	(Cuba) Yoelkis Guibert	13
Runs	(Mexico) Fernando Villegas	10
Home runs	(Mexico) Fernando Villegas	4
Runs batted in	(Mexico) Fernando Villegas	13
Slugging percentage	(Mexico) Fernando Villegas	1.444

=== Pitching ===
Statistic	Name	Total
Wins	4 tied with (Note: Eduardo Paredes, Hansel Paulino, Wilmer Ríos, Yoennis Yera)	2
Losses	4 tied with (Note: Jordan Lucas, Luis Mateo, Wilfredo Ramírez, Andrés Santiago)	2
Saves	(Venezuela) Eduardo Paredes	3
Innings pitched	(Cuba) Yoennis Yera	10
Innings pitched	(Mexico) Wilmer Ríos	10
Earned runs allowed	4 tied with (Note: Jonathan Carbó, Eduardo Paredes, Luis Miranda, Faustino Carrera)	0.00
Strikeouts	(Cuba) Yoennis Yera	16
