= Alexis Wilson =

Mexican baseball player (born 1996)

Tigres de Quintana Roo – No. 26
- Catcher
- Born: August 13, 1996 (age 29); Los Mochis, Mexico
- Bats: Right Throws: Right
- Stats at Baseball Reference
Medals
Men's baseball
Representing Mexico
Central American and Caribbean Games
Gold medal – first place	2023 San Salvador	Team
World Baseball Classic
Bronze medal – third place	2023 Miami	Team
Pan American Games
Bronze medal – third place	2023 Santiago	Team

Irving Alexis Wilson (born August 13, 1996) is a Mexican professional baseball catcher for the Tigres de Quintana Roo of the Mexican League. He signed with the St. Louis Cardinals as an international free agent in 2014. Wilson is listed at 5 feet 10 inches (1.78 m) and 200 pounds (91 kg) and bats and throws right handed.

== Career ==
=== St. Louis Cardinals ===
On March 28, 2014, Wilson signed with the St. Louis Cardinals organization as an international free agent. He made his professional debut with the Dominican Summer League Cardinals, going 4-for-19 in 6 games. In 27 games for the team in 2015, Wilson batted .248/.339/.446 with two home runs and 21 RBI.

In 2016, Wilson split the year between the DSL Cardinals and the rookie-level Gulf Coast League Cardinals, recording a .226/.335/.278 slash line with no home runs and 18 RBI. The following year, Wilson split the season between the rookie-level Johnson City Cardinals and the Low-A State College Spikes, accumulating a .248/.347/.390 batting line with two home runs and 17 RBI. In 2018, Wilson split the year between State College and the Single-A Peoria Chiefs, batting .200/.339/.276 with no home runs and five RBI in 35 games between the two teams. In 2019, Wilson split the season between Peoria and the High-A Palm Beach Cardinals, hitting .281/.339/.384 with a career-high in home runs, with five, and 17 RBI.

Wilson did not play in a game in 2020 due to the cancellation of the minor league season because of the COVID-19 pandemic. On May 27, 2020, Wilson was released by the Cardinals organization.

=== Tigres de Quintana Roo ===
On May 20, 2021, Wilson signed with the Tigres de Quintana Roo of the Mexican League. In 42 games for the team, he batted .227/.318/.364 with five home runs and 20 RBI. Wilson was named an All-Star in 2022 as a replacement for Sebastián Valle, a year in which he hit .248/.340/.412 with nine home runs and 40 RBI across 80 appearances.

Wilson made 64 appearances for Quintana Roo during the 2023 season, hitting .243/.317/.336 with five home runs and 30 RBI. He played in 65 games for the Tigres in 2024, slashing .200/.294/.370 with eight home runs and 21 RBI.

Wilson made 26 appearances for Quintana Roo in 2025, batting .207/.313/.310 with two home runs and six RBI. On June 2, 2025, it was announced that Wilson would miss the remainder of the season after undergoing surgery to repair a torn meniscus.

== International career ==
Wilson was selected to the Mexico national baseball team at the 2020 Summer Olympics (contested in 2021).

In June 2023, Wilson represented Mexico at the 2023 Central American and Caribbean Games, where the team won the gold medal.
