= Yadil Mujica =

Cuban baseball player (born 1985)

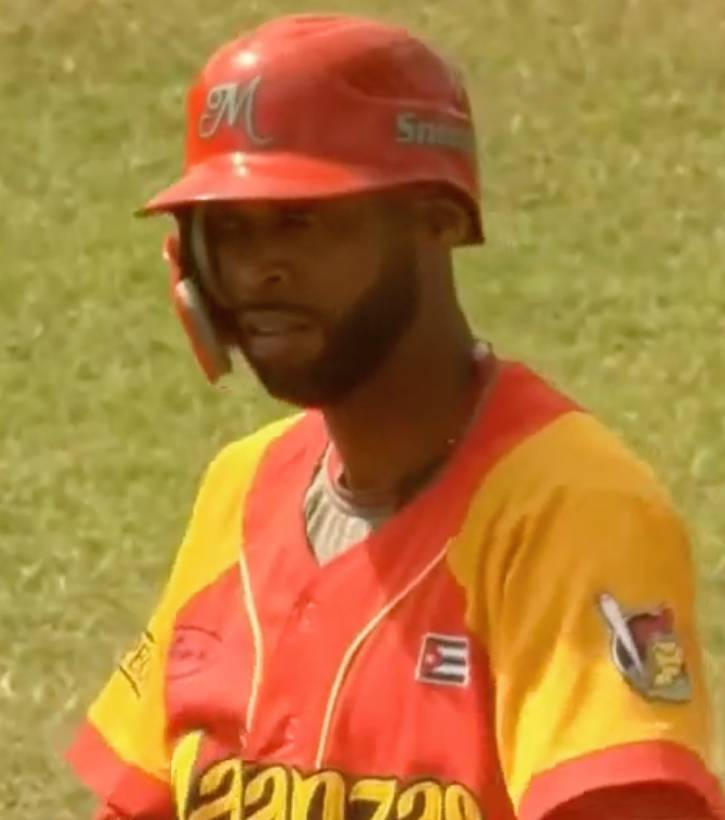
- Mujica in 2021

Cocodrilos de Matanzas – No. 1
- Shortstop
- Born: 11 January 1985 (age 41); Matanzas, Cuba
- Bats: Left Throws: Right
- Stats at Baseball Reference
Medals
Men's baseball
Representing Cuba
Central American and Caribbean Games
| Silver medal – second place | 2023 San Salvador | Team |
Caribbean Cup
| Gold medal – first place | 2023 Puerto Rico | Team |

Yadil Orestes Mujica Díaz (born 1 January 1985) is a Cuban professional baseball shortstop for the Cocodrilos de Matanzas of the Cuban National Series.

== Career ==
Mujica played for Matanzas of the Cuban National Series. He was left off of the Cuban national baseball team roster for the 2008 Olympics. Though he was listed on the provisional roster for the 2009 World Baseball Classic, he did not make the tournament's final roster.

Mujica defected to the United States, and signed with the New York Yankees organization as an international free agent on March 27, 2011. He made his affiliates debut for the Double-A Trenton Thunder of the Eastern League, batting .233/.294/.273 with one home run, 14 RBI, and three stolen bases.

Mujica was promoted to the Triple-A Scranton/Wilkes-Barre Yankees of the International League in 2012. After receiving three plate appearances in three games for Scranton/Wilkes-Barre, Mujica was reassigned to the Thunder. He was named the Eastern League's Offensive Player of the Week for the week ending April 29, in which he batted 10-for-18 with six runs scored and a .600 on-base percentage. In 83 appearances split between Scranton, Trenton, and the High-A Tampa Yankees, Mujica slashed .226/.289/.281 with one home run, 13 RBI, and three stolen bases. Mujica was released by the Yankees organization on December 13, 2012.

Mujica played for the Cuban national team at the 2023 World Baseball Classic.

== See also ==
- List of baseball players who defected from Cuba
