= Fernando Villegas =

Mexican baseball player (born 1998)

Saraperos de Saltillo – No. 8
- Outfielder
- Born: 28 June 1998 (age 27); Saltillo, Coahuila, Mexico
- Bats: Right Throws: Right
- Stats at Baseball Reference

Career highlights and awards
- Mexican League MVP (2023); Mexican League batting champion (2023)
Medals
Men's baseball
Representing Mexico
Central American and Caribbean Games
Gold medal – first place	2023 San Salvador	Team
Pan American Games
Bronze medal – third place	2023 Santiago	Team

Fernando Villegas Luna (Note: In this Spanish name, the first or paternal surname is Villegas and the second or maternal family name is Luna.) (born 28 June 1998) is a Mexican professional baseball outfielder for the Saraperos de Saltillo of the Mexican League. Villegas played in the minor leagues for the Pittsburgh Pirates organization and has represented Mexico at the 2023 Central American and Caribbean Games and 2023 Pan American Games.

== Early life ==
Villegas was born in Saltillo, Coahuila on 28 June 1998. He started playing baseball at the age of three in local youth teams in his hometown, coached by his father, Fernando Villegas Sr., who played professionally in the Mexican League. He represented the state of Coahuila in the National Olympiad, a youth amateur sports event organized by CONADE, three times in 2012, 2013 and 2014, where he won silver, bronze and gold medals respectively.

In 2013, Villegas was signed by the Saraperos de Saltillo and joined the club's academy, where he played for five years, including 43 games with the Tiburones de Puerto Peñasco of the Liga Norte de México in 2017.

== Professional career ==
=== Pittsburgh Pirates ===
On February 10, 2018, Villegas signed a minor league contract with the Pittsburgh Pirates organization. He made his affiliated debut with the GCL Pirates of the rookie-level Gulf Coast League. In 2019, Villegas played for the rookie-level Bristol Pirates before being promoted to the West Virginia Black Bears of the Low-A New York–Penn League, where he batted .219 with 15 RBI and one home run in 21 games.

Villegas did not play in a game in 2020 due to the cancellation of the minor league season because of the COVID-19 pandemic. Villegas was released by the Pittsburgh Pirates on 26 June 2021.

=== Saraperos de Saltillo ===
Villegas returned to the Saraperos de Saltillo making his Mexican League (LMB) debut in the 2021 season, playing eight games, batting .364 with one home run and seven RBI. In 2022, he finished the season recording a .346 batting average, eight home runs, 48 RBI, 16 doubles and leading the LMB in triples with ten. In his third year in the LMB, Villegas won the 2023 Mexican League Most Valuable Player Award and batting title, after finishing the season with a .390 batting average, 104 hits, 16 home runs and 58 RBI.

=== Mexican Pacific League ===
Villegas joined the Charros de Jalisco of the Mexican Pacific League ahead of the 2019–20 season, but he did not become part of the regular lineup until the 2022–23 season, when he won the Rookie of the Year Award.

== International career ==
Villegas was selected to represent Mexico at the 2023 Central American and Caribbean Games, where the team won the gold medal. He won the tournament's triple crown, batting .611 with four home runs and 13 RBIs.

Villegas was part of the Mexican squad that won the bronze medal at the 2023 Pan American Games contested in Santiago, Chile in October 2023. He played six games, batting .450 with six RBIs.
