= Mexico national baseball team =

National sports team

Mexico National Baseball Team

Information
- Country: Mexico
- Federation: Federación Mexicana de Béisbol (FEMEBE)
- Confederation: WBSC Americas
- Manager: Benji Gil
- Captain: Alejandro Kirk
- Team Colors: Dark Red, Dark Green, White

WBSC ranking
- Current: 10 ▼4 (18 November 2026)
- Highest: 2 (November 2 2023)
- Lowest: 12 (December 2014)

Uniforms
Home	Away	Third

Olympic Games
- Appearances: 1 (first in 2020)
- Best result: 6th (2020)

World Baseball Classic
- Appearances: 6 (first in 2006)
- Best result: (bronze) 3rd (1 time, in 2023)

WBSC Premier12
- Appearances: 3 (first in 2015)
- Best result: (bronze) 3rd (1 time, in 2019)

World Cup
- Appearances: 22 (first in 1940)
- Best result: (silver) 2nd (4 times, most recent in 1965)

Pan American Games
- Appearances: 16 (first in 1951)
- Best result: (bronze) 3rd (5 times, most recent in 2023)

The Mexico national baseball team (Spanish: Selección de béisbol de México), it is also known in Spanish by the nickname Novena Mexicana (English: Mexican Nonet), is the baseball team that represents Mexico in international tournaments. It is currently the 10th-ranked baseball team in the world.

The team competed in the 2026 World Baseball Classic in March 2026.

== Current roster ==
Mexico – 2026 World Baseball Classic roster
Players		Coaches
Pitchers: 35 Alexander Armenta; 77 Javier Assad; 22 Brennan Bernardino; 1 Taj Bradley; 24 Alex Carrillo; 49 Jesús Cruz; 53 Daniel Duarte; 62 Robert Garcia; 27 Luis Gastélum; 75 Andrés Muñoz; 17 Samy Natera Jr.; 55 Roel Ramírez; 33 Gerardo Reyes; 11 Victor Vodnik; 99 Taijuan Walker	Catchers: 30 Alejandro Kirk; 26 Alexis Wilson; Infielders: 2 Nacho Alvarez Jr.; 8 Jonathan Aranda; 13 Nick Gonzales; 32 Joey Meneses; 7 Joey Ortiz; 59 Jared Serna; 44 Rowdy Tellez; 3 Luis Urías; Outfielders: 56 Randy Arozarena; 16 Jarren Duran; 31 Julián Ornelas; 19 Alejandro Osuna; 5 Alek Thomas	Manager: 10 Benji Gil; Coaches: 9 Vinny Castilla (bench); 15 Santiago Chávez (bullpen); 18 Jacob Cruz (hitting); 92 Manny del Campo (bullpen); 45 Elmer Dessens (pitching); 70 Bobby Magallanes (hitting); 21 Tony Perezchica (third base); 48 Horacio Ramírez (pitching); 12 Gil Velazquez (first base); 30 active; (15 pitchers, 15 position players)
Updated: February 25, 2026

== Results and fixtures ==
The following is a list of professional baseball match results currently active in the latest version of the WBSC World Rankings, as well as any future matches that have been scheduled.

Legend

Win Lose Void or postponed Fixture

=== 2019 ===
Pan American Games Q	January 30	Nicaragua	12–4	Mexico	Estádio Nishi, Brazil
Pan American Games Q	10:00 BRT		Boxscore

Pan American Games Q	January 31	Mexico	13–3	Brazil	Estádio Nishi, Brazil
Pan American Games Q	14:30 BRT		Boxscore

Pan American Games Q	February 1	Mexico	3–2	Dominican Republic	Estádio Nishi, Brazil
Pan American Games Q	10:00 BRT		Boxscore

Friendly	March 9	Mexico	4–2	Japan	Kyocera Dome, Japan
Friendly			Boxscore

Friendly	March 10	Mexico	0–6	Japan	Kyocera Dome, Japan
Friendly			Boxscore

WBSC Premier12 GS	November 2	Dominican Republic	1–6 (F/6)	Mexico	Estadio Panamericano, Mexico
WBSC Premier12 GS	19:00 CT		Boxscore		Attendance: 8,000

WBSC Premier12 GS	November 3	Mexico	8–2	United States	Estadio Panamericano, Mexico
WBSC Premier12 GS	19:00 CT		Boxscore		Attendance: 10,123

WBSC Premier12 GS	November 5	Netherlands	2–10	Mexico	Estadio Panamericano, Mexico
WBSC Premier12 GS	19:00 CT		Boxscore		Attendance: 6,895

WBSC Premier12 SR	November 11	Chinese Taipei	0–2	Mexico	ZOZO Marine Stadium, Japan
WBSC Premier12 SR	12:00 JT		Boxscore		Attendance: 2,803

WBSC Premier12 SR	November 12	Australia	0–3	Mexico	Tokyo Dome, Japan
WBSC Premier12 SR	12:00 JT		Boxscore		Attendance: 2,089

WBSC Premier12 SR	November 13	Mexico	1–3	Japan	Tokyo Dome, Japan
WBSC Premier12 SR	19:00 JT		Boxscore		Attendance: 31,776

WBSC Premier12 SR	November 15	Mexico	3–7	South Korea	Tokyo Dome, Japan
WBSC Premier12 SR	19:00 JT		Boxscore		Attendance: 5,121

WBSC Premier12 3rd	November 17	United States	2–3 (F/10)	Mexico	Tokyo Dome, Japan
WBSC Premier12 3rd	12:00 JT		Boxscore		Attendance: 0

=== 2021 ===
Summer Olympics GS	July 30	Mexico	0–1	Dominican Republic	Yokohama Stadium, Japan
Summer Olympics GS	12:00 JT	LP: Teddy Stankiewicz	Boxscore	WP: Ángel Sánchez; Sv: Luis Castillo (1)	Attendance: 0

Summer Olympics GS	July 31	Japan	7–4	Mexico	Yokohama Stadium, Japan
Summer Olympics GS	12:00 JT	WP: Masato Morishita; Sv: Ryoji Kuribayashi (1); HR: Tetsuto Yamada (1), Hayato Sakamoto (1)	Boxscore	LP: Juan Pablo Oramas; HR: Joey Meneses (1)	Attendance: 0

Summer Olympics R1	August 1	Israel	12–5	Mexico	Yokohama Stadium, Japan
Summer Olympics R1	12:00 JT	WP: Zack Weiss; HR: Danny Valencia (2)	Boxscore	LP: Manny Barreda	Attendance: 0

=== 2023 ===
World Baseball Classic GS	March 11	Colombia	5–4 (F/10)	Mexico	Chase Field, United States
World Baseball Classic GS	12:00 MT	WP: Guillermo Zuñiga (1–0); HR: Reynaldo Rodríguez (1)	Boxscore	LP: Jesús Cruz (0–1); HR: Randy Arozarena (1)	Attendance: 28,497; Umpires: HP: Cory Blaser. 1B: Edwin Louisa. 2B: Doug Eddings. 3B: Jairo Mendoza

World Baseball Classic GS	March 12	Mexico	11–5	United States	Chase Field, United States
World Baseball Classic GS	19:00 MT	WP: Patrick Sandoval (1–0); HR: Joey Meneses (2)	Boxscore	LP: Nick Martinez (0–1); HR: Will Smith (1)	Attendance: 47,534; Umpires: HP: Alan Porter. 1B: Jairo Mendoza. 2B: Edwin Louisa. 3B: Cory Blaser.

World Baseball Classic GS	March 14	Great Britain	1–2	Mexico	Chase Field, United States
World Baseball Classic GS	19:00 MT	LP: Tahnaj Thomas (0–1)	Boxscore	WP: JoJo Romero (1–0); Sv: Giovanny Gallegos (1)	Attendance: 17,705; Umpires: HP – Cory Blaser, 1B – Carlos Torres, 2B – Félix Tejada, 3B – Jhonatan Biarreta

World Baseball Classic GS	March 15	Mexico	10–3	Canada	Chase Field, United States
World Baseball Classic GS	12:00 MT	WP: José Urquidy (1–0); HR: Rowdy Tellez (1)	Boxscore	LP: Rob Zastryzny (0–1); HR: Bo Naylor (1), Edouard Julien (2)	Attendance: 17,245; Umpires: HP – Carlos Torres, 1B – Doug Eddings, 2B – Jhonathan Biarreta, 3B – Edwin Louisa

World Baseball Classic QF	March 17	Puerto Rico	4–5	Mexico	loanDepot Park, United States
World Baseball Classic QF	19:00 ET	LP: Alexis Díaz (0–1); HR: Javier Báez (1), Eddie Rosario (2)	Boxscore	WP: JoJo Romero (2–0); Sv: Giovanny Gallegos (2); HR: Isaac Paredes (1)	Attendance: 35,817; Umpires: HP – Will Little, 1B – Atsushi Fukaya, 2B – Ki Talk Park, 3B – Dan Bellino

World Baseball Classic SF	March 20	Mexico	5–6	Japan	loanDepot Park, United States
World Baseball Classic SF	19:00 ET	LP: Giovanny Gallegos (0–1); HR: Luis Urias (1)	Boxscore	WP: Taisei Ota (1–0); HR: Masataka Yoshida (2)	Attendance: 35,933; Umpires: HP – Quinn Wolcott, 1B – Ramiro Alfaro, 2B – Jong Chui Park, 3B – Lance Barksdale, LF – Edward Pinales, RF – John Tumpane

Central American and Caribbean Games	June 24	Mexico	4–0	Cuba	Parque Nacional de Pelota Saturnino Bengoa, El Salvador
Central American and Caribbean Games	9:30 UTC–6	WP: Wilmer Ríos	Boxscore	LP: Carlos Viera	Attendance: 450

Central American and Caribbean Games	June 25	El Salvador	0–4	Mexico	Parque Nacional de Pelota Saturnino Bengoa, El Salvador
Central American and Caribbean Games	20:00 UTC–6	LP: Faustino Carrera	Boxscore	WP: Wilfredo Ramírez; HR: Randy Romero (1), Fernando Villegas (1)	Attendance: 1,800

Central American and Caribbean Games	June 27	Nicaragua	0–7	Mexico	Parque Nacional de Pelota Saturnino Bengoa, El Salvador
Central American and Caribbean Games	17:30 UTC–6	LP: Osman Gutiérrez	Boxscore	WP: Luis Miranda; HR: Rainel Rosario (1), Fernando Villegas (1), Emmanuel Ávila (1)	Attendance: 710

Central American and Caribbean Games	June 28	Dominican Republic	6–2	Mexico	Parque Nacional de Pelota Saturnino Bengoa, El Salvador
Central American and Caribbean Games	17:10 UTC–6	WP: Hansel Paulino; HR: Adrián Valerio (1)	Boxscore	LP: Yoanner Negrín	Attendance: 500

Central American and Caribbean Games	June 29	Puerto Rico	4–5	Mexico	Parque Nacional de Pelota Saturnino Bengoa, El Salvador
Central American and Caribbean Games	15:05 UTC–6	LP: Andrés Santiago; HR: Edwin Gómez (1)	Boxscore	WP: Francisco Haro; Sv: Samuel Zazueta; HR: Fernando Villegas (2)	Attendance: 200

=== 2024 ===
WBSC Premier12 GS	November 9	Venezuela	8–4	Mexico	Estadio Panamericano, Mexico
WBSC Premier12 GS	20:00 UTC–6	WP: Ricardo Pinto; Sv: Anthony Vizcaya; HR: Jermaine Palacios (2)	Boxscore	LP: Manny Bañuelos; HR: Alan Trejo (1), Chris Carter (1)	Attendance: 9,758; Umpires: Keith McConkey

WBSC Premier12 GS	November 10	Mexico	7–5	Puerto Rico	Estadio Panamericano, Mexico
WBSC Premier12 GS	20:00 UTC–6	WP: Luis Ángel Rodríguez; Sv: R. J. Alaniz; HR: José Rojas (1)	Boxscore	LP: Jason Garcia	Attendance: 2,921; Umpires: Shane Vincent Cannon

WBSC Premier12 GS	November 11	Panama	3–2	Mexico	Estadio Panamericano, Mexico
WBSC Premier12 GS	20:00 UTC–6	WP: Abdiel Mendoza; Sv: Alberto Baldonado	Boxscore	LP: Jesús Cruz; HR: José Gaitán (1), Tres Barrera (1)	Attendance: 1,921; Umpires: Ramiro Alfaro

WBSC Premier12 GS	November 13	Mexico	8–6	Netherlands	Estadio Panamericano, Mexico
WBSC Premier12 GS	20:00 UTC–6	WP: Jesús Cruz; Sv: R. J. Alaniz; HR: Juan Pérez (1)	Boxscore	LP: Eric Mendez; HR: Denzel Richardson (1), Ray-Patrick Didder (1), Dwayne Kemp (1)	Attendance: 2,257; Umpires: Omar Peralta

WBSC Premier12 GS	November 14	United States	12–2 (F/7)	Mexico	Estadio Panamericano, Mexico
WBSC Premier12 GS	20:00 UTC–6	WP: Antonio Menendez; HR: Ryan Ward (2), Termarr Johnson (1), Justin Crawford (1)	Boxscore	LP: Luis Fernando Miranda; HR: Alan Trejo (1)	Attendance: 9,721

=== 2026 ===
World Baseball Classic GS	March 6	Mexico	8–2	Great Britain	Daikin Park, United States
World Baseball Classic GS	12:00 UTC–6	WP: Robert Garcia; HR: Nacho Alvarez Jr. (1), Jonathan Aranda (1)	Boxscore	LP: Gary Gill Hill; HR: Harry Ford (1)	Attendance: 29,724; Umpires: Roberto Ortiz

World Baseball Classic GS	March 8	Brazil	0–16 (F/6)	Mexico	Daikin Park, United States
World Baseball Classic GS	19:00 UTC–5	LP: Eric Pardinho	Boxscore	WP: Taijuan Walker; HR: Jarren Duran (1), Alejandro Kirk (1), Alek Thomas (1), Julián Ornelas (1)	Attendance: 36,380; Umpires: Scott Barry

World Baseball Classic GS	March 9	Mexico	3–5	United States	Daikin Park, United States
World Baseball Classic GS	19:00 UTC–5	LP: Jesús Cruz; HR: Jarren Duran 2 (3)	Boxscore	WP: Paul Skenes; HR: Aaron Judge (2), Roman Anthony (1)	Attendance: 41,628; Umpires: Adrian Johnson

World Baseball Classic GS	March 10	Italy	9–1	Mexico	Daikin Park, United States
World Baseball Classic GS	18:00 UTC–5	WP: Aaron Nola; HR: Vinnie Pasquantino 3 (3), Jon Berti (1)	Boxscore	LP: Javier Assad	Attendance: 39,894; Umpires: Alex Tosi

== International results ==
=== World Baseball Classic ===
Mexico has competed in all five editions of the World Baseball Classic.

==== Game log ====
2006 World Baseball Classic
Date	Location	Opponent	Score^{1}
March 7, 2006	Phoenix, Arizona	United States	0–2 L
March 8, 2006	Scottsdale, Arizona	South Africa	10–4 W
March 9, 2006	Phoenix, Arizona	Canada	9–1 W
March 12, 2006	Anaheim, California	South Korea	1–2 L
March 14, 2006	Anaheim, California	Japan	1–6 L
March 16, 2006	Anaheim, California	United States	2–1 W
2009 World Baseball Classic
Date	Location	Opponent	Score^{1}
March 8, 2009	Mexico City, Mexico	Australia	7–17 L
March 9, 2009	Mexico City, Mexico	South Africa	14–3 W
March 11, 2009	Mexico City, Mexico	Australia	16–1 W
March 12, 2009	Mexico City, Mexico	Cuba	4–16 L
March 15, 2009	San Diego, California	South Korea	2–8 L
March 17, 2009	San Diego, California	Cuba	4–7 L
2013 World Baseball Classic
Date	Location	Opponent	Score^{1}
March 7, 2013	Scottsdale, Arizona	Italy	5–6 L
March 8, 2013	Phoenix, Arizona	United States	5–2 W
March 9, 2013	Phoenix, Arizona	Canada	3–10 L
2017 World Baseball Classic
Date	Location	Opponent	Score^{1}
March 9, 2017	Guadalajara, Mexico	Italy	9–10 L
March 11, 2017	Guadalajara, Mexico	Puerto Rico	4–9 L
March 12. 2017	Guadalajara, Mexico	Venezuela	11–9 W
2023 World Baseball Classic
Date	Location	Opponent	Score^{1}
March 11th, 2023	Phoenix, Arizona	Colombia	4–5 L
March 12th, 2023	Phoenix, Arizona	United States	11–5 W
March 14th, 2023	Phoenix, Arizona	Great Britain	2-1 W
March 15th, 2023	Phoenix, Arizona	Canada	10–3 W
March 17th, 2023	Miami, Florida	Puerto Rico	5–4 W
March 20th, 2023	Miami, Florida	Japan	5–6 L
2026 World Baseball Classic
Date	Location	Opponent	Score^{1}
March 6th, 2026	Houston, Texas	Great Britain	8–2 W
March 8th, 2026	Houston, Texas	Brazil	16–0 W
March 9th, 2026	Houston, Texas	United States	3–5 L
March 11th, 2026	Houston, Texas	Italy	1–9 L

^{1} – Mexico score always listed first

==== Record by opponent ====
Mexican World Baseball Classic Record by Opponent
Opponent	Tournaments met	W-L record	Largest victory		Largest defeat		Current streak
Opponent	Tournaments met	W-L record	Score	Tournament	Score	Tournament	Current streak
Australia	1	1–1	16–1 (F/6)	Mexico 2009	17–7 (F/8)	Mexico 2009	W1
Brazil	1	1–0	16–0 (F/6)	United States 2026	–		W1
Canada	3	2–1	9–1	United States 2006	10–3	United States 2013	W1
Colombia	1	0–1	–		5–4 (F/10)	United States 2023	L1
Cuba	1	0–2	–		16–4 (F/7)	Mexico 2009	L2
Great Britain	2	2–0	8–2	United States 2026	–		W2
Italy	3	0–3	–		9–1	United States 2026	L3
Japan	2	0–2	–		6–1	United States 2006	L2
Puerto Rico	2	1–1	5–4	United States 2023	9–4	Mexico 2017	W1
South Africa	2	2–0	14–3	Mexico 2009	–		W2
South Korea	2	0–2	–		8–2	United States 2009	L2
United States	4	3–2	11–5	United States 2023	5–3	United States 2026	L1
Venezuela	1	1–0	11–9	Mexico 2017	–		W1
Overall	6	13–15	Against BRA		Against CUB		L2
Overall	6	13–15	16–0 (F/6)	United States 2026	16–4 (F/7)	Mexico 2009	L2

Mexican WBC Qualification Record by Opponent
Opponent	Tournaments met	W-L record	Largest victory		Largest defeat		Current streak
Opponent	Tournaments met	W-L record	Score	Tournament	Score	Tournament	Current streak
Czech Republic	1	1–0	2–1	Mexico 2017	–		W1
Nicaragua	1	2–0	11–0 (F/7)	Mexico 2017	–		W2
Overall	1	3–0	Against NCA		–		W3
Overall	1	3–0	11-0 (F/7)	Mexico 2017	–	–	W3

==== Batting records for the national team ====
The data was taken from the official website of the World Baseball Classic in the section of statistics. Qualifying stats are not taken into account. Updated until th end of Mexico's participation in the 2026 edition. Data science tools such as the R language were applied.

===== Runs [R] =====
#	Player	WBC	AB	R
1	Randy Arozarena	2: '23 '26	33	11
2	Adrián González	4: '06 '09 '13 '17	57	10
3	Alek Thomas	2: '23 '26	35	9
4	Jorge Cantú	3: '06 '09 '13	63	7
4	Joey Meneses	2: '23 '26	33	7
4	Jarren Duran	2: '23 '26	20	7

===== Hits [H] =====
#	Player	WBC	AB	H
1	Jorge Cantú	3: '06 '09 '13	63	20
2	Adrián González	4: '06 '09 '13 '17	57	13
2	Karim García	3: '06 '09 '13	36	13
2	Joey Meneses	2: '23 '26	33	13
5	Randy Arozarena	2: '23 '26	33	11

===== Doubles [2B] =====
#	Player	WBC	AB	2B
1	Jorge Cantú	3: '06 '09 '13	63	7
1	Randy Arozarena	2: '23 '26	33	7
3	Adrián González	4: '06 '09 '13 '17	57	3
3	Ramiro Peña	1: '13	13	3

===== Triples [3B] =====
#	Player	WBC	AB	3B
1	Karim García	3: '06 '09 '13	36	1

===== Home Runs [HR] =====
#	Player	WBC	AB	HR
1	Jorge Cantú	3: '06 '09 '13	63	4
2	Adrián González	4: '06 '09 '13 '17	57	3
2	Karim García	3: '06 '09 '13	36	3
2	Jarren Duran	2: '23 '26	20	3
5	Joey Meneses	2: '23 '26	33	2
5	Oscar Robles	1: '09	13	2
5	Esteban Quiroz	1: '17	6	2

===== Runs Batted In [RBI] =====
#	Player	WBC	AB	RBI
1	Jorge Cantú	3: '06 '09 '13	63	17
2	Adrián González	4: '06 '09 '13 '17	57	13
3	Randy Arozarena	2: '23 '26	33	10
4	Joey Meneses	2: '23 '26	33	7
5	Karim García	3: '06 '09 '13	36	6
5	Alek Thomas	2: '23 '26	35	6
5	Isaac Paredes	1: '23	24	6
5	Luis Alfonso Cruz	3: '06 '13 '17	21	6

===== Base on Balls [BB] =====
#	Player	WBC	G	BB
1	Adrián González	4: '06 '09 '13 '17	17	13
2	Randy Arozarena	2: '23 '26	10	9
3	Scott Hairston	1: '09	6	8
4	Miguel Ojeda	2: '06 '09	9	7
5	Rowdy Tellez	2: '23 '26	10	4
5	Alan Trejo	1: '23	6	4
5	Austin Barnes	1: '23	5	4

===== Stolen Bases [SB] =====
#	Player	WBC	AB	SB
1	Jarren Duran	2: '23 '26	20	4
2	Alek Thomas	2: '23 '26	35	2
2	Edgar González	2: '09 '13	21	2
2	Alfredo Amezaga	2: '06 '09	9	2

===== Average [AVG] =====
15 AB minimum.

#	Player	WBC	AB	AVG
1	Joey Meneses	2: '23 '26	33	0.394
2	Isaac Paredes	1: '23	24	0.375
3	Karim García	3: '06 '09 '13	36	0.361
4	Randy Arozarena	2: '23 '26	33	0.333
5	Jorge Cantú	3: '06 '09 '13	63	0.317
6	Jonathan Aranda	2: '23 '26	20	0.300
7	Jorge Vázquez	1: '09	17	0.294
8	Vinny Castilla	1: '06	24	0.292

==== Pitching records for the national team ====
The data was taken from the official website of the World Baseball Classic in the section of statistics. Qualifying stats are not taken into account. Updated until th end of Mexico's participation in the 2026 edition. Data science tools such as the R language were applied.

===== Wins [W] =====
#	Player	WBC	G	GS	IP	W (Record)	Against
1	Jojo Romero	1: '23	4	0	3.1	2 (2-0)	vs Great Britain (W) Group Stage vs Puerto Rico (W) Quarterfinals
2	Elmer Dessens	2: '06 '09	4	1	10.2	1 (1-0)	vs South Africa (W) Group Stage
2	Patrick Sandoval	1: '23	2	2	7.1	1 (1-0)	vs United States (W) Group Stage
2	Yovani Gallardo	2: '13 '17	2	2	7.1	1 (1-0)	vs United States (W) Group Stage
2	Taijuan Walker	2: '23 '26	2	2	7.1	1 (1-0)	vs Brazil (W) Group Stage
2	José Urquidy	1: '23	2	1	6.1	1 (1-0)	vs Canada (W) Group Stage
2	Luis Mendoza	2: '13 '17	2	1	6.0	1 (1-0)	vs Venezuela (W) Group Stage
2	Robert Garcia	1: '26	3	0	2.1	1 (1-0)	vs Great Britain (W) Group Stage
2	Edgar Gonzalez	1: '06	2	0	2.0	1 (1-0)	vs United States (W) Quarterfinals
2	Francisco Campos	2: '06 '09	4	1	9.1	1 (1-1)	vs South Africa (W) Group Stage vs Cuba (L) Group Stage
2	Esteban Loaiza	1: '06	2	2	9.0	1 (1-1)	vs Canada (W) Group Stage vs Japan (L) Quarterfinals
2	Jorge Campillo	1: '09	2	2	8.2	1 (1-1)	vs Australia (W) Group Stage vs Cuba (L) Quarterfinals

===== Earned Run Average [ERA] =====
6 IP minimum

#	Player	WBC	G	GS	IP	ERA
1	Taijuan Walker	2: '23 '26	2	2	7.1	0.00
2	Elmer Dessens	2: '06 '09	4	1	10.2	0.84
3	Patrick Sandoval	1: '23	2	2	7.1	1.23
4	Javier Assad	2: '23 '26	4	2	13.2	2.63
5	Luis Mendoza	2: '13 '17	2	1	6.0	3.00

===== Strikeouts [SO] =====
#	Player	WBC	G	GS	IP	SO
1	Javier Assad	2: '23 '26	4	2	13.2	13
2	Óliver Pérez	4: '06 '09 '13 '17	7	3	12.1	11
2	Rodrigo López	3: '06 '09 '13	5	3	12.0	11
2	Taijuan Walker	2: '23 '26	2	2	7.1	11
5	Francisco Campos	2: '06 '09	4	1	9.1	10
5	Julio Urías	1: '23	2	2	9.0	10
7	Yovani Gallardo	2: '13 '17	2	2	7.1	9
8	Pablo Ortega	2: '06 '09	5	1	8.2	8
8	Patrick Sandoval	1: '23	2	2	7.1	8
10	José Urquidy	1: '23	2	1	6.1	7

===== Saves [SV] =====
#	Player	WBC	G	IP	SVO	SV	Against
1	Giovanny Gallegos	2: '17 '23	5	5.0	3	2	vs Great Britain (SV) Group Stage vs Puerto Rico (SV) Quarterfinals
2	David Cortés	2: '06 '09	6	4.0	1	1	vs United States (SV) Quarterfinals
2	Sergio Romo	2: '13 '17	4	3.1	2	1	vs United States (SV) Group Stage
2	Roberto Osuna	1: '17	2	0.2	1	1	vs Venezuela (SV) Group Stage

==== Individual Awards ====
Player	Tournament	Award	Details
Randy Arozarena	2023	Most Valuable Player "Group C"	He batted 14-7 (.500) with an on-base percentage of .632, a slugging percentage of 1.071, and an OPS of 1.703 in the four games at Chase Field in Phoenix, helping Benjamin Gil's team win the series.
Randy Arozarena	2023	All-World Baseball Classic team [Outfielder]	He batted 20-9 (.450) with an on-base percentage of .607, a slugging percentage of .900, and an OPS of 1.507. He had 6 doubles and 1 home run, as well as 8 runs scored and 9 runs batted in over 6 games..
Patrick Sandoval	2023	All-World Baseball Classic team [Pitcher]	He started the games against the United States (Group Stage) and Japan (Semifinals). He had a 1-0 record with a 1.23 ERA and 8 strikeouts in 7.1 innings pitched.

=== Premier12 Tournament ===
==== 2015 ====
Team Mexico came in fourth in the 2015 WBSC Premier12 Tournament.

==== 2019 ====
Team Mexico won the bronze medal in the 12-team 2019 WBSC Premier12 Tournament in November 2019. Two quota spots were allocated from the Tournament, of the spots for six baseball teams at the 2020 Olympic Games, with Mexico as the top finisher from the Americas earning one spot. First baseman/left fielder Efrén Navarro led the team with three doubles and shared the team lead with six RBIs, designated hitter Matt Clark led the team with a .440 OBP and an .800 slugging percentage and shared the team lead with three home runs, and second baseman Esteban Quiroz led the team with seven walks. Half the Team Mexico roster consisted of players with birth certificates form the United States.

== Competitive records ==
=== World Baseball Classic ===
World Baseball Classic record							Qualification record			
Year	Round	Position	W	L	RS	RA	W	L	RS	RA
(United States) 2006	Quarterfinals	6th	3	3	23	16	No qualifiers held			
(Mexico) (United States) 2009	Quarterfinals	8th	2	4	47	52	No qualifiers held			
(United States) 2013	Group stage	11th	1	2	13	18	Automatically qualified			
(Mexico) 2017	Group stage	13th	1	2	24	28	3	0	25	2
(United States) 2023	Third place	(bronze) 3rd	4	2	37	24	Automatically qualified			
(United States) 2026	Group stage	11th	2	2	28	16	Automatically qualified			
Total	Semifinals	6/6	13	15	172	154	3	0	25	2

=== Olympic Games ===
Summer Olympics record								Qualification record
Year	Round	Position	W	L	%	RS	RA	Method
(Spain) 1992	Did not qualify							Did not qualify
(United States) 1996	Did not qualify							Did not qualify
(Australia) 2000	Did not qualify							Did not qualify
(Greece) 2004	Did not qualify							Did not qualify
(China) 2008	Did not qualify							Did not qualify
(Japan) 2020	Preliminary	6th	0	3	.000	9	20	2019 WBSC Premier12
(United States) 2028	Did not qualify							2026 World Baseball Classic
Total	Preliminary	1/7	0	3	.000	9	20	

=== WBSC Premier12 ===
WBSC Premier12 record
Year	Round	Position	W	L	%	RS	RA	Ranking
(Japan) (Taiwan) 2015	Fourth Place	4th	3	5	.375	29	50	12th
(Mexico) 2019	Third Place	(bronze) 3rd	7	2	.778	44	19	6th
(Japan) (Mexico) 2024	Opening Round	7th	2	3	.400	17	12	2nd
2027	To be determined							
Total	Third Place	3/3	10	7	.588	90	81	

=== Baseball World Cup ===
- 1941 : (bronze) Bronze
- 1943 : (silver) Silver
- 1944 : (silver) Silver
- 1961 : (silver) Silver
- 1965 : (silver) Silver

=== Continental ===
Pan American Games

- 1951 (bronze) Bronze
- 1963 (bronze) Bronze
- 2003 (bronze) Bronze
- 2007 (bronze) Bronze
- 2023 (bronze) Bronze

=== Regional ===
Central American and Caribbean Games

- 1926 (silver) Silver
- 1930 (silver) Silver
- 1950 (silver) Silver
- 1954 (silver) Silver
- 1962 (bronze) Bronze
- 1970 (bronze) Bronze
- 1993 (silver) Silver
- 2006 (bronze) Bronze
- 2010 (silver) Silver
- 2023 (gold) Gold

=== Youth teams ===
U-23 Baseball World Cup

- 2018 (gold) Gold
- 2021 (silver) Silver
