= Baseball at the 2023 Central American and Caribbean Games – Qualification =

The following is the qualification system and qualified athletes, countries and teams for the Baseball at the 2023 Central American and Caribbean Games competitions. As the host nation, El Salvador qualifies a team with 24 athletes automatically. The WBSC ranking determined the next four as of the December 31, 2022 release: Cuba, Dominican Republic, Mexico, and Venezuela. The top two non-qualified finishers of the Caribbean Baseball Cup, Bahamas 2022 (COCABE) will receive their quota automatically, which are Puerto Rico and Curaçao. The highest non-qualified finisher of the 2023 Centroamericano de Beisbol received the last slot, which is Nicaragua.

== Timeline ==
Event	Dates	Location(s)	Berth(s)	Qualified
Host nation	—	—	1	El Salvador
WBSC World Rankings	December 31, 2022	—	4	Mexico; Venezuela; Cuba; Dominican Republic
2022 Caribbean Baseball Cup	December 4–11, 2022	(The Bahamas) Nassau	2	Puerto Rico; Curaçao
2023 Central American & Caribbean Games Qualifier	February 6–12, 2023	(Nicaragua) Managua	1	Nicaragua

== WBSC World Rankings ==
Countries in the Central America, Caribbean, or northern South American regions are eligible for all Central American & Caribbean Games. The top four highest eligible countries qualified for the main tournament using the December 31, 2022 WBSC World Rankings release, which are Mexico, Venezuela, Cuba, and the Dominican Republic.

Legend

Qualified for the 2023 Central American and Caribbean Games

Top 20 rankings as of 31 December 2022
Rank	Change	Team	Points	Region
1	Steady	Japan	4179	East Asia
2	Steady	Chinese Taipei	3819	East Asia
3	▲2	United States	3449	Northern America
4	▼1	South Korea	3428	East Asia
5	▼1	Mexico	3273	Central America
6	▲1	Venezuela	2723	South America
7	▲1	Netherlands	2468	Western Europe
8	▲1	Cuba	2246	Caribbean
9	▼3	Dominican Republic	1894	Caribbean
10	Steady	Australia	1889	Australasia
11	Steady	Colombia	1669	South America
12	▲1	Panama	1529	Central America
13	▲3	Puerto Rico	1419	Caribbean
14	▼2	Canada	1404	Northern America
15	▼1	Czech Republic	1313	Eastern Europe
16	▲1	Italy	1206	Southern Europe
17	▼2	Nicaragua	1117	Central America
18	Steady	Germany	1075	Western Europe
19	Steady	Spain	806	Southern Europe
20	Steady	Israel	702	Western Asia

== 2022 Caribbean Baseball Cup ==
=== Group stage ===
Pos	Team	Pld	W	L	RF	RA	RD	PCT	Qualification
1	Puerto Rico	4	3	1	27	9	+18	.750 (Note: Cuba defeated Puerto Rico 6–0,)	Advanced to the Semifinals
2	Cuba	4	3	1	26	16	+10	.750	Advanced to the Semifinals
3	Curaçao	4	2	2	36	30	+6	.500	Advanced to the Semifinals
4	Bahamas	4	1	3	19	38	−19	.250 (Note: The Bahamas defeated the U.S. Virgin Islands 4–3.)	Advanced to the Semifinals
5	U.S. Virgin Islands	4	1	3	14	29	−15	.250	

Source: WBSC
Notes:

December 4; 15:00 ET	Curaçao	7–1	Puerto Rico	Rodgers Stadium, Bahamas; Attendance: 105
December 4; 15:00 ET		Boxscore		Rodgers Stadium, Bahamas; Attendance: 105

December 4; 19:00 ET	U.S. Virgin Islands	3–4	Bahamas	Rodgers Stadium, Bahamas; Attendance: 1,502
December 4; 19:00 ET		Boxscore		Rodgers Stadium, Bahamas; Attendance: 1,502

December 5; 15:00 ET	Cuba	9–0	U.S. Virgin Islands	Rodgers Stadium, Bahamas; Attendance: 173
December 5; 15:00 ET		Boxscore		Rodgers Stadium, Bahamas; Attendance: 173

December 5; 19:00 ET	Bahamas	10–12	Curaçao	Rodgers Stadium, Bahamas; Attendance: 1,300
December 5; 19:00 ET		Boxscore		Rodgers Stadium, Bahamas; Attendance: 1,300

December 6; 15:00 ET	Curaçao	10–11	U.S. Virgin Islands	Rodgers Stadium, Bahamas; Attendance: 210
December 6; 15:00 ET		Boxscore		Rodgers Stadium, Bahamas; Attendance: 210

December 6; 19:00 ET	Puerto Rico	6–0	Cuba	Rodgers Stadium, Bahamas; Attendance: 307
December 6; 19:00 ET		Boxscore		Rodgers Stadium, Bahamas; Attendance: 307

December 7; 14:00 ET	U.S. Virgin Islands	0–6	Puerto Rico	Rodgers Stadium, Bahamas; Attendance: 87
December 7; 14:00 ET		Boxscore		Rodgers Stadium, Bahamas; Attendance: 87

December 7; 19:00 ET	Bahamas	3–9	Cuba	Rodgers Stadium, Bahamas; Attendance: 1,803
December 7; 19:00 ET		Boxscore		Rodgers Stadium, Bahamas; Attendance: 1,803

December 8; 15:00 ET	Cuba	8–7	Curaçao	Rodgers Stadium, Bahamas; Attendance: 153
December 8; 15:00 ET		Boxscore		Rodgers Stadium, Bahamas; Attendance: 153

December 8; 19:00 ET	Puerto Rico	14–2	Bahamas	Rodgers Stadium, Bahamas; Attendance: 1,710
December 8; 19:00 ET		Boxscore		Rodgers Stadium, Bahamas; Attendance: 1,710

=== Knockout stage ===
Semifinals
December 10 – Nassau
Curaçao	2
Cuba	4
December 10 – Nassau
Bahamas	3
Puerto Rico	9

Championship
December 11 – Nassau
Cuba	4
Puerto Rico	9
Third place
December 11 – Nassau
Bahamas	2
Curaçao	4

==== Semifinals ====
December 10; 14:00 ET	Curaçao	2–4	Cuba	Rodgers Stadium, Bahamas; Attendance: 86
December 10; 14:00 ET		Boxscore		Rodgers Stadium, Bahamas; Attendance: 86

December 10; 19:00 ET	Bahamas	3–9	Puerto Rico	Rodgers Stadium, Bahamas; Attendance: 2,030
December 10; 19:00 ET		Boxscore		Rodgers Stadium, Bahamas; Attendance: 2,030

==== Third place game ====
December 11; 13:00 ET	Bahamas	2–4	Curaçao	Rodgers Stadium, Bahamas
December 11; 13:00 ET		Boxscore		Rodgers Stadium, Bahamas

==== Championship ====
December 11; 17:00 ET	Cuba	4–9	Puerto Rico	Rodgers Stadium, Bahamas; Attendance: 1,603
December 11; 17:00 ET		Boxscore		Rodgers Stadium, Bahamas; Attendance: 1,603

=== Standings ===
Rk	Team	W	L	Notes
1	Puerto Rico	5	1	Qualification to the 2023 Central American and Caribbean Games
2	Cuba	4	2	Qualified through the WBSC World Rankings method
3	Curaçao	3	3	Qualification to the 2023 Central American and Caribbean Games
4	Bahamas	1	5	
5	U.S. Virgin Islands	1	3	

== 2023 Central American & Caribbean Games Qualifier ==
=== Group stage ===
Pos	Team	Pld	W	L	RF	RA	RD	Qualification
1	Nicaragua	4	4	0	49	0	+49	Advanced to Final
2	Honduras	4	3	1	24	14	+10	Advanced to Final
3	Costa Rica	4	2	2	9	23	−14	Advanced to Bronze medal game
4	Guatemala	4	1	3	8	38	−30	Advanced to Bronze medal game
5	El Salvador	4	0	4	7	22	−15	

Source: WBSC

February 6; 11:00 CT	Costa Rica	3–1	El Salvador	Martínez Stadium, Nicaragua
February 6; 11:00 CT		Boxscore		Martínez Stadium, Nicaragua

February 6; 18:30 CT	Honduras	0–7	Nicaragua	Martínez Stadium, Nicaragua; Attendance: 560
February 6; 18:30 CT		Boxscore		Martínez Stadium, Nicaragua; Attendance: 560

February 7; 11:00 CT	Honduras	10–2	Guatemala	Martínez Stadium, Nicaragua
February 7; 11:00 CT		Boxscore		Martínez Stadium, Nicaragua

February 7; 18:30 CT	Nicaragua	13–0 (F/7)	Costa Rica	Martínez Stadium, Nicaragua
February 7; 18:30 CT		Boxscore		Martínez Stadium, Nicaragua

February 8; 11:00 CT	Costa Rica	1–6	Honduras	Martínez Stadium, Nicaragua
February 8; 11:00 CT		Boxscore		Martínez Stadium, Nicaragua

February 8; 18:30 CT	Guatemala	3–2	El Salvador	Martínez Stadium, Nicaragua
February 8; 18:30 CT		Boxscore		Martínez Stadium, Nicaragua

February 9; 11:00 CT	Guatemala	3–5	Costa Rica	Martínez Stadium, Nicaragua; Attendance: 100
February 9; 11:00 CT		Boxscore		Martínez Stadium, Nicaragua; Attendance: 100

February 9; 18:30 CT	El Salvador	0–8	Nicaragua	Martínez Stadium, Nicaragua
February 9; 18:30 CT		Boxscore		Martínez Stadium, Nicaragua

February 10; 11:00 CT	El Salvador	4–8	Honduras	Martínez Stadium, Nicaragua
February 10; 11:00 CT		Boxscore		Martínez Stadium, Nicaragua

February 10; 18:30 CT	Nicaragua	21–0 (F/7)	Guatemala	Martínez Stadium, Nicaragua
February 10; 18:30 CT		Boxscore		Martínez Stadium, Nicaragua

=== Bronze medal game ===
February 12; 13:00 CT	Guatemala	0–4	Costa Rica	Martínez Stadium, Nicaragua
February 12; 13:00 CT		Boxscore		Martínez Stadium, Nicaragua

=== Final ===
February 12; 18:00 CT	Honduras	1–13	Nicaragua	Martínez Stadium, Nicaragua; Attendance: 5,000
February 12; 18:00 CT		Boxscore		Martínez Stadium, Nicaragua; Attendance: 5,000

=== Standings ===
Rk	Team	W	L	Notes
1	Nicaragua	5	0	Qualification to the 2023 Central American and Caribbean Games
2	Honduras	3	2	
3	Costa Rica	3	2	
4	Guatemala	1	4	
5	El Salvador	0	4	
