= Dominican Republic men's national baseball team =

Information
- Country: Dominican Republic
- Federation: Federación Dominicana de Béisbol (FEDOBE)
- Confederation: WBSC Americas
- Manager: Albert Pujols (WBC 2026)
- Captain: Manny Machado (WBC 2026)
- Team Colors: Blue, red, white

WBSC ranking
- Current: 8 (26 October 2026)
- Highest: 6 (2 times; first in December 2014)
- Lowest: 13 (2 times; first in December 2012)

Uniforms
Home	Away

Olympic Games
- Appearances: 2 (first in 1992)
- Best result: Bronze: 1 - 2020

World Baseball Classic
- Appearances: 6 (first in 2006)
- Best result: (gold) 1st (2013)

World Cup
- Appearances: 22 (first in 1941)
- Best result: (gold) 1st (1948)

Intercontinental Cup
- Best result: 3rd (1981)

Pan American Games
- Best result: 1st (1955)

The Dominican Republic men's national baseball team (Spanish: Selección nacional de béisbol masculina de la República Dominicana) also known as "Plátano Power", is the men's national baseball team of the Dominican Republic. The team won the Baseball World Cup in 1948 and the World Baseball Classic in 2013. They are the first team to have won both world competitions. They are currently ranked 11th by the World Baseball Softball Confederation. At the Olympics in 2021 the team faced Israel, Japan, Mexico, South Korea, and the United States.

The team competed against Team Israel, Team Puerto Rico, Team Venezuela, and Team Nicaragua in the 2023 World Baseball Classic, but failed to advance out of the first round.

The team competed against Israel, the Netherlands, Venezuela, and Nicaragua in the 2026 World Baseball Classic at LoanDepot Park in Miami, Florida, in Pool D. The Puerto Rico and Venezuela teams, managed by Yadier Molina and Omar López respectively, were not rivals for the Dominicans and They defeated South Korea in the quarterfinals before falling to the United States in the semifinals.

== Results and fixtures ==
The following is a list of professional baseball game results currently active in the latest version of the WBSC World Rankings, as well as any future games that have been scheduled.

Legend

Win Draw Lose Void or postponed Fixture

=== 2023 ===
Friendly	March 8	Dominican Republic	9–0	Minnesota Twins	Cool Today Park, North_Port,_Florida, United States

Friendly	March 9	Dominican Republic	1–2	Detroit Tigers	Hammond Stadium, Fort Myers, United States

World Baseball Classic GS	March 11	Dominican Republic	1–5	Venezuela	LoanDepot Park, Miami, United States
World Baseball Classic GS	19:00 ET	LP: Sandy Alcántara (0–1)	Boxscore	WP: José Ruiz (1–0); HR: Anthony Santander (1)	Attendance: 35,890; Umpires: HP: Andy Fletcher. 1B: Tim Meyer. 2B: Ron Kulpa. 3B: Maikol Tibabijo

World Baseball Classic GS	March 13	Dominican Republic	6–1	Nicaragua	LoanDepot Park, Miami, United States
World Baseball Classic GS	12:00 ET	WP: Cristian Javier (1–0); HR: Juan Soto (1), Manny Machado (1)	Boxscore	LP: J. C. Ramírez (0–1)	Attendance: 31,696; Umpires: HP – Chris Graham, 1B – Mike Estabrook, 2B – Maikol Tibabijo, 3B – Ángel Hernández

World Baseball Classic GS	March 14	Israel	0–10 (F/7)	Dominican Republic	LoanDepot Park, Miami, United States
World Baseball Classic GS	19:00 ET	LP: Jacob Steinmetz (0–1)	Boxscore	WP: Roansy Contreras (1–0); HR: Manny Machado (2)	Attendance: 33,307; Umpires: HP – Mike Estabrook, 1B – Andy Fletcher, 2B – Chris Graham, 3B – Maikol Tibabijo

World Baseball Classic GS	March 15	Puerto Rico	5–2	Dominican Republic	LoanDepot Park, Miami, United States
World Baseball Classic GS	19:00 ET	WP: Jovani Morán (1–0); Sv: Edwin Díaz (1); HR: Christian Vázquez (1)	Boxscore	LP: Johnny Cueto (0–1); HR: Juan Soto (2)	Attendance: 36,025; Umpires: HP – Chris Guccione, 1B – Ron Kulpa, 2B – Chris Graham, 3B – Tim Meyer

Central American and Caribbean Games FR	June 24	Dominican Republic	6-5 (F/8)	Nicaragua	Parque Nacional de Pelota Saturnino Bengoa, San Salvador, El Salvador
Central American and Caribbean Games FR	16:30 (UTC–6)		Boxscore

Central American and Caribbean Games FR	June 25	Venezuela	5–2	Dominican Republic	Parque Nacional de Pelota Saturnino Bengoa, San Salvador, El Salvador
Central American and Caribbean Games FR	9:30 (UTC–6)		Boxscore

Central American and Caribbean Games FR	June 26	Puerto Rico	Cancelled	Dominican Republic	Parque Nacional de Pelota Saturnino Bengoa, San Salvador, El Salvador
Central American and Caribbean Games FR	9:30 (UTC–6)		Boxscore

Central American and Caribbean Games FR	June 28	Dominican Republic	6–2	Mexico	Parque Nacional de Pelota Saturnino Bengoa, San Salvador, El Salvador
Central American and Caribbean Games FR	17:10 (UTC–6)		Boxscore

Central American and Caribbean Games FR	June 28	El Salvador	2–6	Dominican Republic	Parque Nacional de Pelota Saturnino Bengoa, San Salvador, El Salvador
Central American and Caribbean Games FR	20:30 (UTC–6)		Boxscore

Central American and Caribbean Games FR	June 29	Dominican Republic	0–12 (F/6)	Cuba	Parque Nacional de Pelota Saturnino Bengoa, San Salvador, El Salvador
Central American and Caribbean Games FR	13:00 (UTC–6)		Boxscore

Central American and Caribbean Games FR	June 30	Curaçao	0–10 (F/6)	Dominican Republic	Parque Nacional de Pelota Saturnino Bengoa, San Salvador, El Salvador
Central American and Caribbean Games FR	20:30 (UTC–6)		Boxscore

Central American and Caribbean Games 3rd Place	July 1	Venezuela	8–7 (F/8)	Dominican Republic	Parque Nacional de Pelota Saturnino Bengoa, San Salvador, El Salvador
Central American and Caribbean Games 3rd Place	17:30 (UTC–6)		Boxscore

Pan American Games GS	October 19	Panama	4–1	Dominican Republic	Centro de Béisbol y Sóftbol, Cerrillos, Chile
Pan American Games GS	9:30		Boxscore

Pan American Games GS	October 21	Dominican Republic	0–1	Mexico	Centro de Béisbol y Sóftbol, Cerrillos, Chile
Pan American Games GS	9:30 CLT		Boxscore

Pan American Games GS	October 23	Chile	2–12 (F/5)	Dominican Republic	Centro de Béisbol y Sóftbol, Cerrillos, Chile
Pan American Games GS	15:00		Boxscore

Pan American Games 5th Place	October 26	Cuba	4–5	Dominican Republic	Centro de Béisbol y Sóftbol, Cerrillos, Chile
Pan American Games 5th Place	15:30		Boxscore

Friendly	December 3	Dominican Republic	5–4	Puerto Rico	Estadio Cibao, Santiago de los Caballeros, Dominican Republic
Friendly	17:00		Boxscore		Attendance: 12,378

=== 2024 ===
Caribbean Baseball Cup GS	October 23	Dominican Republic	1–8	Curaçao	Andre Rodgers National Baseball Stadium, Nassau
Caribbean Baseball Cup GS	15:00 (UTC–4)		Boxscore

Caribbean Baseball Cup GS	October 24	Dominican Republic	2–8	Cuba	Andre Rodgers National Baseball Stadium, Nassau
Caribbean Baseball Cup GS	11:00 (UTC–4)		Boxscore

Caribbean Baseball Cup GS	October 25	Sint Maarten	2–1	Dominican Republic	Andre Rodgers National Baseball Stadium, Nassau
Caribbean Baseball Cup GS	15:00 (UTC–4)		Boxscore

Caribbean Baseball Cup GS	October 25	U.S. Virgin Islands	3–4	Dominican Republic	Andre Rodgers National Baseball Stadium, Nassau
Caribbean Baseball Cup GS	11:00 (UTC–4)		Boxscore

Caribbean Baseball Cup GS	October 27	Dominican Republic	4–1	Bahamas	Andre Rodgers National Baseball Stadium, Nassau
Caribbean Baseball Cup GS	19:00 (UTC–4)		Boxscore

WBSC Premier12 GS	November 13	Dominican Republic	6–1	Cuba	Tianmu Stadium, Taiwan
WBSC Premier12 GS	18:30 NST		Boxscore		Attendance: 255

WBSC Premier12 GS	November 14	Chinese Taipei	2–1	Dominican Republic	Taipei Dome, Taiwan
WBSC Premier12 GS	18:30 NST	WP: Huang Tzu-peng; Sv: Wu Chun-wei; HR: Chiang Kun-yu (1)	Boxscore	LP: Pedro Fernandez	Attendance: 25,000

WBSC Premier12 GS	November 15	Dominican Republic	0–5	Australia	Tianmu Stadium, Taiwan
WBSC Premier12 GS	15:00 NST		Boxscore		Attendance: 1,112

WBSC Premier12 GS	November 16	Dominican Republic	6–9	South Korea	Tianmu Stadium, Taiwan
WBSC Premier12 GS	18:30 NST		Boxscore		Attendance: 3,387

WBSC Premier12 GS	November 18	Japan	11–3	Dominican Republic	Tianmu Stadium, Taiwan
WBSC Premier12 GS	18:00 NST		Boxscore		Attendance: 2,572

Friendly	December 10	Venezuela	Cancelled	Dominican Republic	Estadio Simon Bolivar, Venezuela

=== 2025 ===
Friendly	November 15	Dominican Republic	6–2	Puerto Rico	Citi Field, New York City, United States
Friendly	13:00 NYT		Boxscore		Attendance: 20,057

=== 2026 ===
Friendly	March 3	Dominican Republic	12–4	Detroit Tigers	Estadio Quisqueya, Santo Domingo, Dominican Republic
Friendly					Attendance: 13,186

Friendly	March 4	Dominican Republic	4–4	Detroit Tigers	Estadio Quisqueya, Santo Domingo, Dominican Republic
Friendly					Attendance: 11,500

World Baseball Classic GS	March 6	Nicaragua	3–12	Dominican Republic	LoanDepot Park, Miami, United States
World Baseball Classic GS	19:00 UTC−5	LP: Stiven Cruz (0-1)	Boxscore	WP: Seranthony Domínguez (1-0); HR: Junior Caminero (1), Oneil Cruz (1), Julio Rodríguez (1)	Attendance: 35,127; Umpires: HP – Paul Clemons, 1B – Lance Barksdale, 2B – Serge Makouchetchev, 3B – Marek Vicar

World Baseball Classic GS	March 8	Netherlands	1–12 (F/7)	Dominican Republic	LoanDepot Park, Miami, United States
World Baseball Classic GS	12:00 EDT	LP: Arij Fransen (0-1)	Boxscore	WP: Luis Severino (1-0); HR: Vladimir Guerrero Jr. (1), Junior Caminero (2), Austin Wells (1), Juan Soto (1)	Attendance: 32,324; Umpires: HP – Lance Barksdale, 1B – Serge Makouchetchev, 2B – Paul Clemons, 3B – Marek Vicar

World Baseball Classic GS	March 9	Dominican Republic	10 – 1	Israel	LoanDepot Park, Miami, United States
World Baseball Classic GS	12:00 ET	WP: Brayan Bello (1-0); HR: Fernando Tatis Jr. (1), Oneil Cruz (2)	Boxscore	LP: Ryan Prager (0-1)	Attendance: 28,728; Umpires: HP – Quinn Wolcott, 1B – Gabe Morales, 2B – Michael Ulloa, 3B – Serge Makouchetchev

World Baseball Classic GS	March 11	Dominican Republic	7–5	Venezuela	loanDepot Park, United States
World Baseball Classic GS	20:00 EDT	WP: Sandy Alcántara (1-0); Sv: Elvis Alvarado (1); HR: Juan Soto (2), Ketel Marte (1), Vladimir Guerrero Jr. (2), Fernando Tatís Jr. (1)	Boxscore	LP: Eduardo Rodríguez (0-1)	Attendance: 36,230; Umpires: HP – Gabe Morales, 1B – Marek Vicar, 2B – Paul Clemons, 3B – Michael Ulloa

World Baseball Classic QF	March 13	South Korea	0–10 (F/7)	Dominican Republic	LoanDepot Park, Miami, United States
World Baseball Classic QF	18:30 EDT	LP: Hyun-jin Ryu (0–1)	Boxscore	WP: Cristopher Sánchez (1–0); HR: Austin Wells (2)	Attendance: 30,805; Umpires: HP – Dan Iassogna (USA), 1B – Chris Segal (USA), 2B – Tim Meyer (USA), 3B – Maikol Tibibijo (DOM)

World Baseball Classic SF	March 15	United States	2–1	Dominican Republic	LoanDepot Park, United States
World Baseball Classic SF	20:00 CT	WP: Paul Skenes (2-0); Sv: Mason Miller (2); HR: Gunnar Henderson (2), Roman Anthony (1)	Boxscore	LP: Gregory Soto (0-1); HR: Junior Caminero (3)	Attendance: 36,337; Umpires: HP − Cory Blaser, 1B − Jeremie Rehak, 2B − Dan Bellino, 3B − Delfin Colon, LF − Cuti Suárez, RF − Chris Graham

2026 Central American and Caribbean Games	July 31	Dominican Republic	3-4	Puerto Rico	Estadio Quisqueya, Santo Domingo, Dominican Republic
2026 Central American and Caribbean Games	19:00 (UTC–6)

2026 Central American and Caribbean Games	August 1	Curaçao	1-11 (F/5)	Dominican Republic	Estadio Quisqueya, Santo Domingo, Dominican Republic
2026 Central American and Caribbean Games	19:00 (UTC–6)

2026 Central American and Caribbean Games	August 2	Cuba	9-6	Dominican Republic	Estadio Quisqueya, Santo Domingo, Dominican Republic
2026 Central American and Caribbean Games	19:00 (UTC–6)

2026 Central American and Caribbean Games	August 4	Dominican Republic	5-0	Nicaragua	Estadio Quisqueya, Santo Domingo, Dominican Republic
2026 Central American and Caribbean Games	19:00 (UTC–6)

2026 Central American and Caribbean Games	August 5	Dominican Republic	3-4	Panama	Estadio Quisqueya, Santo Domingo, Dominican Republic
2026 Central American and Caribbean Games	19:00 (UTC–6)

2026 Central American and Caribbean Games	August 6	Colombia	1-5	Dominican Republic	Estadio Quisqueya, Santo Domingo, Dominican Republic
2026 Central American and Caribbean Games	19:00 (UTC–6)

Friendly	December 5	Puerto Rico	Dominican Republic	Hiram Bithorn Stadium, San Juan, Puerto Rico
Friendly	19:00

=== 2027 ===
2027 Pan American Games	July 21	Dominican Republic	TBD	Lima, Peru

=== 2028 ===
2028 Summer Olympics	Jul 14	Dominican Republic	TBD	Los Angeles, California, United States

== National Squads ==
Dominican Republic – 2026 World Baseball Classic roster
Players		Coaches
Pitchers: 54 Albert Abreu; 7 Sandy Alcantara; 31 Elvis Alvarado; 66 Brayan Bello; 43 Huascar Brazobán; 44 Seranthony Domínguez; 75 Camilo Doval; 53 Carlos Estévez; 47 Juan Mejia; 59 Wandy Peralta; 60 Dennis Santana; 40 Luis Severino; 65 Gregory Soto; 61 Cristopher Sánchez; 45 Abner Uribe	Catchers: 50 Agustín Ramírez; 28 Austin Wells; Infielders: 11 Erik González; 27 Vladimir Guerrero Jr.; 3 Manny Machado ^{(C)}; 4 Ketel Marte; 2 Geraldo Perdomo; 14 Amed Rosario; 41 Carlos Santana; Outfielders: 15 Oneil Cruz; 44 Julio Rodríguez; 0 Junior Lake; 22 Juan Soto; 23 Fernando Tatis Jr.; Designated hitters: 13 Junior Caminero	Manager: 5 Albert Pujols; Coaches: 20 Placido Polanco (Bench); 99 Rene Rojas (Hitting); 29 Jorge Mejia (Assistant Hitting); 30 Wellington Cepeda (Pitching); 62 Joel Peralta (Assistant Pitching); 12 Julio Borbon (First Base); 52 Carlos Febles (Third Base); 39 José Canó (Bullpen Coach); 81 Fleming Báez (Bullpen Catcher); 57 Ronny Perez (Bullpen Catcher)

Dominican Republic – 2024 WBSC Premier12 roster
Players		Coaches
Pitchers: 23 Diego Castillo; 23 Robert Corniel; 56 Pedro Fernández; 91 Henry Henry; 93 Jorge Juan; 72 Franklyn Kilomé; 78 Víctor López; 59 Gerald Ogando; 92 Wily Peralta; 84 Héctor Pérez; 85 Wilber Pérez; 53 Dionys Rodríguez; 57 Joely Rodríguez; 80 Luis Vargas	Catchers: 45 Daneurys de la Cruz; 40 Randy Florentino; 52 Frank Rodríguez; Infielders: 35 Arismendy Alcántara; 31 Andretty Cordero; 74 Michael de León; 38 José Devers; 82 Kelvin Gutiérrez; 37 Alen Hanson; 73 Rainer Núñez; Outfielders: 66 Micker Adolfo; 32 Ricardo Cespedes; 68 Pedro González; 67 Luís Mieses	Manager: 58 César Martín; Coaches: 77 Ramón Martínez; 97 José Canó (Bullpen); 64 Danny Solano (Bench); 88 Welington Castillo (1st Base); 63 Ramon Santiago (3rd Base); 60 Ervin Santana (Pitching); 81 Ronny Paulino (Hitting)

== Individual statistics ==
=== Major League Baseball ===
==== Batting ====
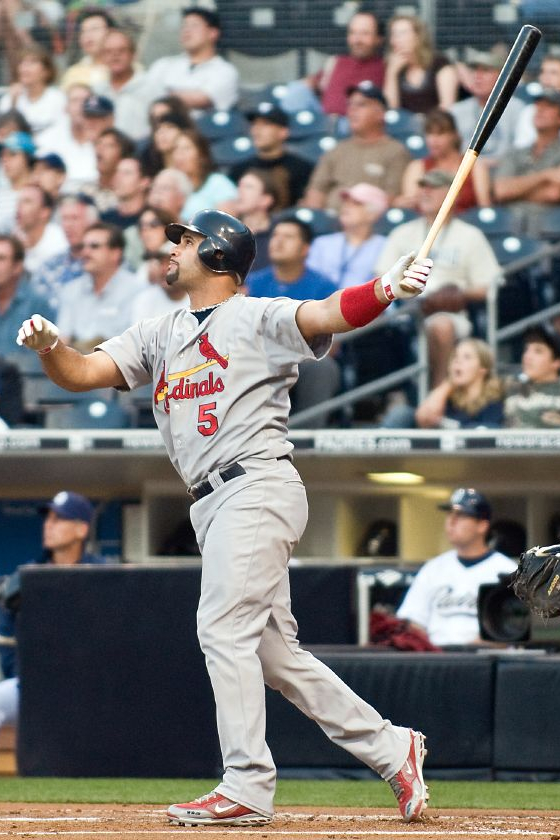
Albert Pujols is the Dominican Republic's most capped player in games, home runs, and hits in the MLB

As of the 2025 Major League Baseball season, Baseball Reference lists 936 players born in the Dominican Republic to have appeared in an MLB roster for batting. Albert Pujols remains as the #1 player in game appearances, hits, and home runs. Three hitters from the Dominican Republic have been inducted into the National Baseball Hall of Fame: David Ortiz, Adrián Beltré, and Vladimir Guerrero. Players listed not below: Nelson Cruz, Vladimir Guerrero, Edwin Encarnación, and Alfonso Soriano place in the Top 10 for home runs while Vladimir Guerrero also places in the Top 10 for hits.

As of 1 November 2025. The records collected are based on data from Baseball Reference and based on the player's country of birth.
Players in bold are still active in Major League Baseball.

Rank	Player	Games	Hits	Home runs	Position	Career
1	Albert Pujols	3,080	3,384	703	1B	2001–2022
2	Adrián Beltré	2,933	3,166	477	3B	1998–2018
3	Julio Franco	2,527	2,586	173	IF	1982–2007
4	David Ortiz	2,408	2,472	541	DH	1997–2016
5	Sammy Sosa	2,354	2,408	609	RF	1989–2007
6	Manny Ramirez	2,302	2,574	555	OF	1993–2011
7	Robinson Canó	2,267	2,639	335	2B	2005–2022
8	**Carlos Santana**	2,204	1,880	335	C	2010–present
9	Aramis Ramírez	2,194	2,303	386	3B	1998–2015
10	Miguel Tejada	2,171	2,407	307	SS	1997–2013

==== Pitching ====
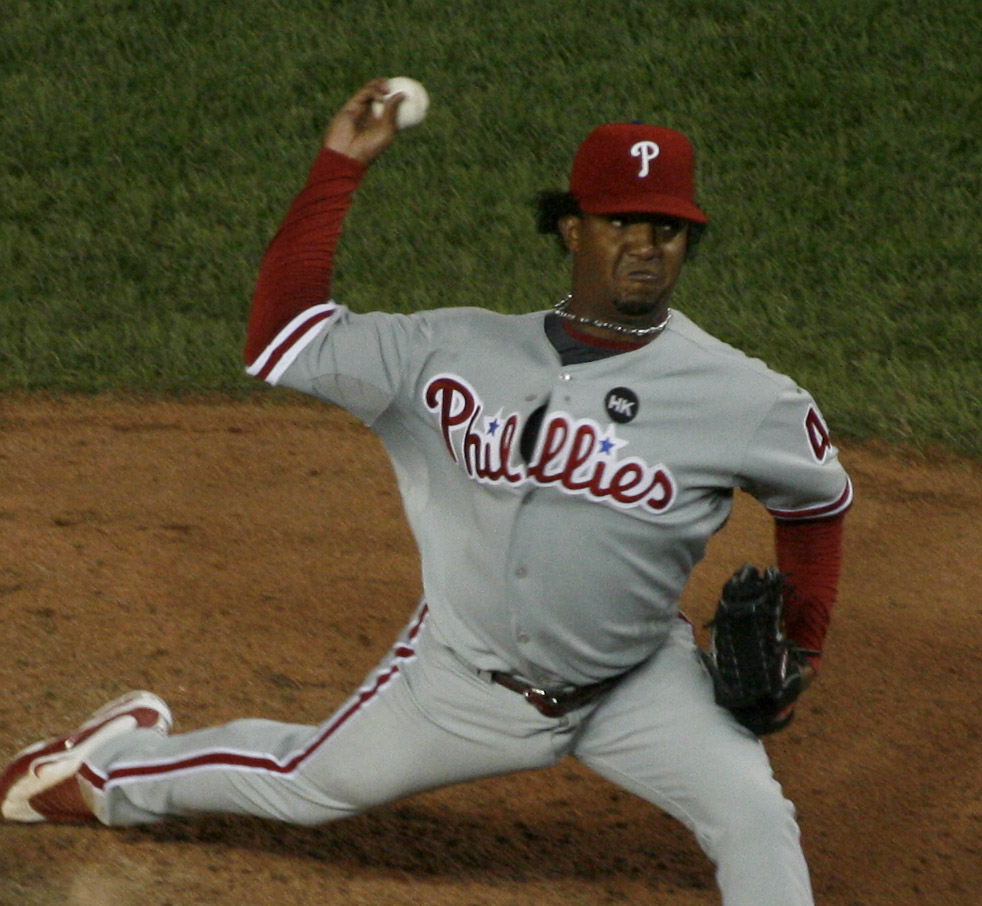
Pedro Martínez is the Dominican Republic's most capped player in strikeouts and one of the two pitchers in the Hall of Fame

As of the 2025 Major League Baseball season, Baseball Reference lists 544 players born in the Dominican Republic to have appeared in an MLB roster for pitching. Two pitchers from the Dominican Republic have been inducted into the Hall of Fame: Pedro Martínez and Juan Marichal. Other notable pitchers not listed: Joaquín Andújar, Miguel Batista, and Ramón Martínez appear in the Top 10 for innings pitched.

As of 1 November 2025. The records collected are based on data from Baseball Reference and based on the player's country of birth.
Players in bold are still active in Major League Baseball.

Rank	Player	Strikeouts	Innings pitched	Career
1	Pedro Martínez	3,154	2,827.1	1992–2009
2	Bartolo Colón	2,535	3,461.2	1997–2018
3	Juan Marichal	2,303	3,507	1960–1975
4	Ervin Santana	1,978	2,486.2	2005–2021
5	Johnny Cueto	1,857	2,256.1	2008–2024
6	Francisco Liriano	1,815	1,813.2	2005–2019
7	Ubaldo Jiménez	1,720	1,870.0	2006–2017
8	Pedro Astacio	1,664	2,196.2	1992–2006
9	José Rijo	1,606	1,880	1984–2002
10	José DeLeón	1,594	1,897.1	1983–2005

== Tournament record ==
=== World Baseball Classic ===
World Baseball Classic record							Qualification record			
Year	Round	Position	W	L	RS	RA	W	L	RS	RA
(Puerto Rico) (United States) 2006	Fourth place	4th	5	2	36	26	No qualifiers held			
(Puerto Rico) 2009	Group stage	9th	1	2	12	5	No qualifiers held			
(Puerto Rico) (United States) 2013	Champions	1st	8	0	36	14	Automatically qualified			
(United States) 2017	Quarterfinals	5th	4	2	33	19	Automatically qualified			
(United States) 2023	Group stage	9th	2	2	19	11	Automatically qualified			
(United States) 2026	Third place	3rd	5	1	52	12	Automatically qualified			
Total	1 title	6/6	25	9	188	87	-	-	-	-

==== 2006 ====
The Dominican Republic was invited to play at the inaugural World Baseball Classic in 2006. Placed in Pool D for the opening round, the Dominican Republic swept through the group, defeating Venezuela, Italy, and Australia at Cracker Jack Stadium in Lake Buena Vista, United States. After falling to Puerto Rico in the first game of the 2nd round in Puerto Rico, the Dominicans recovered to qualify for the semifinals by virtue of winning their last two games. They would fall in the semifinals, however, to Cuba.

2006 WBC Results

7 March; 1st Round, Pool D – Game 1	Dominican Republic Dominican Republic	11–5	Venezuela	United States Cracker Jack Stadium; Attendance: 10,645
7 March; 1st Round, Pool D – Game 1		Boxscore		United States Cracker Jack Stadium; Attendance: 10,645

9 March; 1st Round, Pool D – Game 4	Italy	3–8	Dominican Republic Dominican Republic	United States Cracker Jack Stadium; Attendance: 9,949
9 March; 1st Round, Pool D – Game 4		Boxscore		United States Cracker Jack Stadium; Attendance: 9,949

10 March; 1st Round, Pool D – Game 6	Dominican Republic Dominican Republic	6–4	Australia	United States Cracker Jack Stadium; Attendance: 11,083
10 March; 1st Round, Pool D – Game 6		Boxscore		United States Cracker Jack Stadium; Attendance: 11,083

12 March; 2nd Round, Pool 2 – Game 2	Puerto Rico	7–1	Dominican Republic Dominican Republic	Puerto Rico Hiram Bithorn Stadium; Attendance: 19,692
12 March; 2nd Round, Pool 2 – Game 2		Boxscore		Puerto Rico Hiram Bithorn Stadium; Attendance: 19,692

13 March; 2nd Round, Pool 2 – Game 3	Dominican Republic Dominican Republic	7–3	Cuba	Puerto Rico Hiram Bithorn Stadium; Attendance: 6,594
13 March; 2nd Round, Pool 2 – Game 3		Boxscore		Puerto Rico Hiram Bithorn Stadium; Attendance: 6,594

14 March; 2nd Round, Pool 2 – Game 5	Venezuela	1–2	Dominican Republic Dominican Republic	Puerto Rico Hiram Bithorn Stadium; Attendance: 13,007
14 March; 2nd Round, Pool 2 – Game 5		Boxscore		Puerto Rico Hiram Bithorn Stadium; Attendance: 13,007

18 March; Semifinal	Cuba	3–1	Dominican Republic Dominican Republic	United States Petco Park; Attendance: 41,268
18 March; Semifinal		Boxscore		United States Petco Park; Attendance: 41,268

==== 2009 ====
The Dominicans were placed in Pool D of the 2009 World Baseball Classic, playing their opening round games at Hiram Bithorn Stadium in San Juan, Puerto Rico. Considered one of the pre-tournament favorites with multiple Major League Baseball All-Stars, they were upset in their opening game of the modified double-elimination pool by the Netherlands. After eliminating Panama, they faced the Dutch again for the right to advance but were stunned in 11 innings and eliminated from the competition.

2009 WBC Results

7 March; 1st Round, Pool D – Game 1	Netherlands	3–2	Dominican Republic Dominican Republic	Puerto Rico Hiram Bithorn Stadium; Attendance: 9,335
7 March; 1st Round, Pool D – Game 1		Boxscore		Puerto Rico Hiram Bithorn Stadium; Attendance: 9,335

8 March; 1st Round, Pool D – Game 3	Panama	0–9	Dominican Republic Dominican Republic	Puerto Rico Hiram Bithorn Stadium; Attendance: 9,221
8 March; 1st Round, Pool D – Game 3		Boxscore		Puerto Rico Hiram Bithorn Stadium; Attendance: 9,221

10 March; 1st Round, Pool D – Game 5	Dominican Republic Dominican Republic	1–2 (F/11)	Netherlands	Puerto Rico Hiram Bithorn Stadium; Attendance: 11,814
10 March; 1st Round, Pool D – Game 5		Boxscore		Puerto Rico Hiram Bithorn Stadium; Attendance: 11,814

==== 2013 ====
Drawn into Pool C with Puerto Rico, Spain, and Venezuela at Hiram Bithorn Stadium in San Juan, Puerto Rico once again, the Dominicans opened the round-robin round 1 with a decisive 9–3 victory over 2009 semifinalists Venezuela. A victory over Spain and a Puerto Rico win over Venezuela ensured advancement to the second round; the Dominicans clinched the top seed by defeating the hosts. In the second round, the Dominicans rallied past upstart Italy despite an early 4–0 deficit at Marlins Park in Miami, United States. Two ninth-inning runs pushed the Dominicans past the host Americans and into the semifinals. Another victory over Puerto Rico ensured the Dominicans of the top seed and a chance to avoid two-time defending champions Japan national baseball team. Instead, they would face the surprising semifinalists the Netherlands. After an early 1–0 deficit, four 5th-inning runs pushed the Dominican Republic into the final, where a 3–0 victory over Puerto Rico gave them their first-ever World Baseball Classic title. New York Yankees second baseman Robinson Canó was named MVP of the tournament.

2013 WBC Results

7 March; 1st Round, Pool C – Game 1	Venezuela	3–9	Dominican Republic Dominican Republic	Puerto Rico Hiram Bithorn Stadium; Attendance: 15,055
7 March; 1st Round, Pool C – Game 1		Boxscore		Puerto Rico Hiram Bithorn Stadium; Attendance: 15,055

9 March; 1st Round, Pool D – Game 3	Dominican Republic Dominican Republic	6–3	Spain	Puerto Rico Hiram Bithorn Stadium; Attendance: 13,412
9 March; 1st Round, Pool D – Game 3		Boxscore		Puerto Rico Hiram Bithorn Stadium; Attendance: 13,412

10 March; 1st Round, Pool D – Game 6	Dominican Republic Dominican Republic	4–2	Puerto Rico	Puerto Rico Hiram Bithorn Stadium; Attendance: 19,413
10 March; 1st Round, Pool D – Game 6		Boxscore		Puerto Rico Hiram Bithorn Stadium; Attendance: 19,413

12 March; 2nd Round, Pool 2 – Game 1	Italy	4–5	Dominican Republic Dominican Republic	United States Marlins Park; Attendance: 14,482
12 March; 2nd Round, Pool 2 – Game 1		Boxscore		United States Marlins Park; Attendance: 14,482

14 March; 2nd Round, Pool 2 – Game 4	Dominican Republic Dominican Republic	3–1	United States	United States Marlins Park; Attendance: 34,366
14 March; 2nd Round, Pool 2 – Game 4		Boxscore		United States Marlins Park; Attendance: 34,366

16 March; 2nd Round, Pool 2 – Game 6	Puerto Rico	0–2	Dominican Republic Dominican Republic	United States Marlins Park; Attendance: 19,762
16 March; 2nd Round, Pool 2 – Game 6		Boxscore		United States Marlins Park; Attendance: 19,762

18 March; Final Round, Semifinals	Netherlands	1–4	Dominican Republic Dominican Republic	United States AT&T Park; Attendance: 27,527
18 March; Final Round, Semifinals		Boxscore		United States AT&T Park; Attendance: 27,527

18 March; Final Round, Final	Puerto Rico	0–3	Dominican Republic Dominican Republic	United States AT&T Park; Attendance: 35,703
18 March; Final Round, Final		Boxscore		United States AT&T Park; Attendance: 35,703

==== 2017 ====
The Dominican Republic advanced out of the first round of the 2017 World Baseball Classic. The Dominican Republic's win over the US set a new Marlins Park record for baseball game attendance with 37,446. Manny Machado of the Dominican Republic was named MVP for the first round Pool C bracket of the WBC, after batting .357. In the second round, however, they fell to both Puerto Rico and the United States, eliminating them from the World Baseball Classic and ending the team's championship reign.

==== 2023 ====
In the first round of the 2023 World Baseball Classic, the team prevailed over Israel and Nicaragua, but lost against Venezuela and Puerto Rico. Despite scoring 19 runs to 11 allowed, the Dominican Republic failed to advance out of the first round. By virtue of finishing in the top four of their pool, they qualified to compete in the 2026 World Baseball Classic.

==== 2026 ====
Team Dominican Republic won Pool D in the 2026 World Baseball Classic against Israel, the Netherlands, Venezuela, and Nicaragua. Pool D was played in LoanDepot Park in Miami, Florida. The Dominican Republic defeated South Korea via mercy rule in the quarterfinals, before losing to the eventual runner-ups, the United States. The end of their semifinal against the United States was controversial, as umpire Cory Blaser called shortstop Geraldo Perdomo out on strikes on a slider from Mason Miller that was below the strikezone. Venezuela, who finished second in Pool D to the Dominican Republic, went on to win the tournament.

Eleven-time All Star and three-time NL MVP Albert Pujols managed Team Dominican Republic for the 2026 World Baseball Classic. Four-time All Star outfielder Juan Soto played for the team.

=== Olympic Games ===
The Dominican Republic team participated in the 1992 Olympic Games, the first Olympic medal competition for the sport, and finished 6th. The team failed to qualify for another competition before baseball was eliminated from the Olympics after the 2008 Games. Baseball was brought back for the 2020 Games, and the team qualified for the sixth and final spot in the competition.

At the Olympics in 2021 it faced Israel, Japan, Mexico, South Korea, and the United States, and won a bronze medal.

Summer Olympics record								Qualification
Year	Host	Round	Position	W	L	RS	RA	Qualification
1984	United States	Preliminary	8th (Note: No medals awarded; tournament was a demonstration sport only)	0	3	8	35	Invited as a replacement for Cuba
1992	Spain	Preliminary	6th	2	5	23	60	
1996	United States	did not qualify						
2000	Australia	did not qualify						
2004	Greece	did not qualify						
2008	China	did not qualify						8th, American Qualifying Tournament
2020	Japan	Bronze medal game	3rd	3	3	25	23	Final Qualifying Tournament
2028	United States	Qualified						2026 World Baseball Classic
Total (Note: Totals only include years 1992 to 2020, during which baseball was an official medal sport.)	2/5			5	8	48	83	

=== Baseball World Cup ===
- 1941 : 5th
- 1942 : (silver) 2nd
- 1943 : (bronze) 3rd
- 1944 : 5th
- 1948 : (gold) 1st
- 1950 : (silver) 2nd
- 1951 : 4th
- 1952 : (silver) 2nd
- 1953 : 4th
- 1965 : 5th
- 1969 : (bronze) 3rd
- 1970 : 6th
- 1971 : 6th
- 1954 : 7th
- 1973 : 4th
- 1974 : 4th
- 1976 : 5th
- 1982 : 8th
- 1984 : 12th
- 1994 : 13th
- 1998 : 8th
- 2001 : 8th

=== Pan American Games ===
- 1955 : (gold) 1st
- 1979 : (silver) 2nd

=== Intercontinental Cup ===
- 1981 : (bronze) 3rd

== See also ==
- Dominican Republic women's national baseball team
- Dominican Professional Baseball League
- List of Major League Baseball players from the Dominican Republic
