= Ruderly Manuel =

Dutch baseball player

- Pitcher
- Born: August 26, 1990 (age 35); Willemstad, Curaçao
- Bats: Right Throws: Right
- Stats at Baseball Reference
Medals
Men's baseball
Representing Curaçao
Caribbean Cup
| Silver medal – second place | 2023 Puerto Rico | Team |

Ruderly Manuel (born August 26, 1990) is a professional baseball pitcher. He was a member of the Netherlands national baseball team's designated pitcher pool for the 2017 World Baseball Classic, but not on the team's roster for the tournament. He also pitched in the Honkbal Hoofdklasse in the Netherlands and the Italian Baseball League.
