= Sint Maarten national baseball team =

Information
- Country: Sint Maarten
- Confederation: WBSC Americas
- Manager: Mervin Gario

WBSC ranking
- Current: 64 ▼11 (31 December 2025)

The Sint Maarten national baseball team is the national baseball team of Sint Maarten. The team made its international debut at the 2024 Caribbean Baseball Cup, finishing in fourth place with a 2–3 record.

Sint Maarten was formerly represented as part of the Netherlands Antilles, and its players are eligible for the Netherlands national team.

Carlos van Heyningen was a former Sint Maartener baseball player who played with Quick Amersfoort in the Honkbal Hoofdklasse as well as the Dutch national team (as well as managing the Dutch Antilles team).

== Current roster ==
Sint Maarten roster – 2024 Caribbean Baseball Cup
| Players | | Coaches |
| Pitchers: 16 Finn Kragt; 27 Yassir Lachkart; 66 Ben Meyer; 45 Darlinson Tavarez; 69 Sven van den Sanden; 15 Jack Wagner | Catchers: 44 Julian Gions; 25 Ronald Rivera; Infielders: 11 Denzel Brooks; 33 Arthur Bonevacia; 5 Oscar Bustamante; 3 Victor Draijer; 8 Saury Espiritysanto; 25 Antonio Gibs; 13 Alex Madera; 24 Malacai Williams; 55 Theodore van Heyningen; 41 Daniel Vos; Outfielders: 53 Quintin de Cuba; 7 Jahneiro de la Rosa; 12 Julian King; 10 Jeldwin Orman; 9 Marc Ramirez; 1 Nyheem Romou; 77 Oswaldo Wigley | Manager: Mervin Gario; Coaches: Sherman Gario (coach); Lamar Levenstone (coach) |

== Results and fixtures ==
The following is a list of professional baseball match results currently active in the latest version of the WBSC World Rankings, as well as any future matches that have been scheduled.

Legend

Win Lose Void or postponed Fixture

=== 2024 ===
| 2024 Caribbean Baseball Cup | 23 October | Cuba | 9–0 | Sint Maarten | Andre Rodgers National Baseball Stadium, Nassau |
| 2024 Caribbean Baseball Cup | 11:00 UTC–4 | WP: José Bermúdez | Boxscore | LP: Ben Meyer | Attendance: 300 |

| 2024 Caribbean Baseball Cup | 24 October | Sint Maarten | 8–0 | Bahamas | Andre Rodgers National Baseball Stadium, Nassau |
| 2024 Caribbean Baseball Cup | 19:00 UTC–4 | WP: Daniel Vos | Boxscore | LP: Mateo Fergerson | Attendance: 700 |

| 2024 Caribbean Baseball Cup | 25 October | Sint Maarten | 2–1 | Dominican Republic | Andre Rodgers National Baseball Stadium, Nassau |
| 2024 Caribbean Baseball Cup | 15:00 UTC–4 | WP: Jack Wagner | Boxscore | LP: Bryant Capellán | Attendance: 100 |

| 2024 Caribbean Baseball Cup | 26 October | Curaçao | 5–0 | Sint Maarten | Andre Rodgers National Baseball Stadium, Nassau |
| 2024 Caribbean Baseball Cup | 15:00 UTC–4 | WP: Jeandrick Lourens; HR: Darren Seferina | Boxscore | LP: Sven van den Sanden | Attendance: 100 |

| 2024 Caribbean Baseball Cup | 27 October | Sint Maarten | 5–10 | U.S. Virgin Islands | Andre Rodgers National Baseball Stadium, Nassau |
| 2024 Caribbean Baseball Cup | 11:00 UTC–4 | LP: Yassir Lachkart | Boxscore | WP: Jordan Scott | Attendance: 100 |

== See also ==
- Baseball in the Netherlands
