= Hainley Statia =

Curaçaoan baseball player (born 1986)

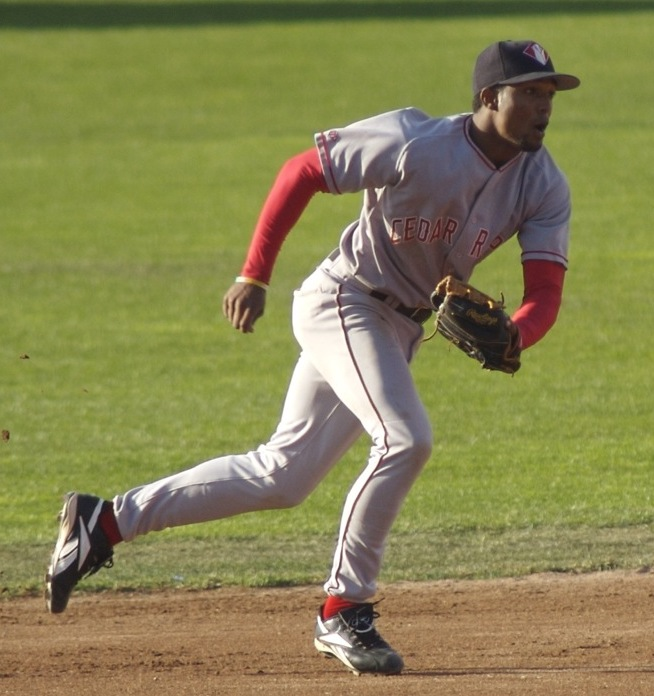
- Statia with the Cedar Rapids Kernels in 2006
- Shortstop / Coach
- Born: January 19, 1986 (age 40); Willemstad, Curaçao
- Bats: Switch Throws: Right
- Stats at Baseball Reference
Medals
Men's baseball
Representing Netherlands
European Baseball Championship
Gold medal – first place	2007 Montjuïc	National team
Gold medal – first place	2014 Brno	National team
France International Baseball Tournament
Gold medal – first place	2014 Sénart	National team
Manager for Curaçao
Caribbean Baseball Cup
Gold medal – first place	2024 Bahamas	Team

Hainley Charles Statia (HINE-lee STAY-sha, born January 19, 1986, in Willemstad, Curaçao) is a Curaçaoan former minor league baseball player and currently the manager of the Arizona Complex League Angels and the Curaçao national baseball team. He also played for the Netherlands national team in the World Baseball Classic.

== Playing career ==
Statia attended Trinity Christian Academy in Deltona, Florida. The Anaheim Angels drafted him in the 9th round of the 2004 Major League Baseball (MLB) draft. He was a 2006 Midwest League All-Star and 2007 California League All-Star. He shared the Angels' minor league player of the year award in 2007. He reached Triple-A in 2009 but never played in MLB. He signed with the independent Lancaster Barnstormers after the 2010 season but joined the Milwaukee Brewers organization before the start of the 2011 season. He played in the minors through 2014.

Statia was also a member of the Netherlands national baseball team at the 2006 and 2009 World Baseball Classic (WBC), suffering an injury during the second tournament, 2013 WBC, as well as the 2007 and 2014 European Baseball Championship.

== Coaching career ==
Statia was a hitting coach for the Arizona Brewers in 2016. On January 26, 2017, Statia was introduced as the hitting coach for the Wisconsin Timber Rattlers, the Class A Midwest League minor league affiliate of the Milwaukee Brewers. He later was a roving instructor in the Brewers system.

Statia became the manager of the ACL Angels in 2024, winning the Los Angeles Angels' minor manager of the year award in his first season leading the team.

Internationally, Statia became the manager of the Curaçao national team in 2021. He led Curaçao to win the 2024 Caribbean Baseball Cup.
