= Ozzie Martínez =

Puerto Rican baseball player (born 1988)

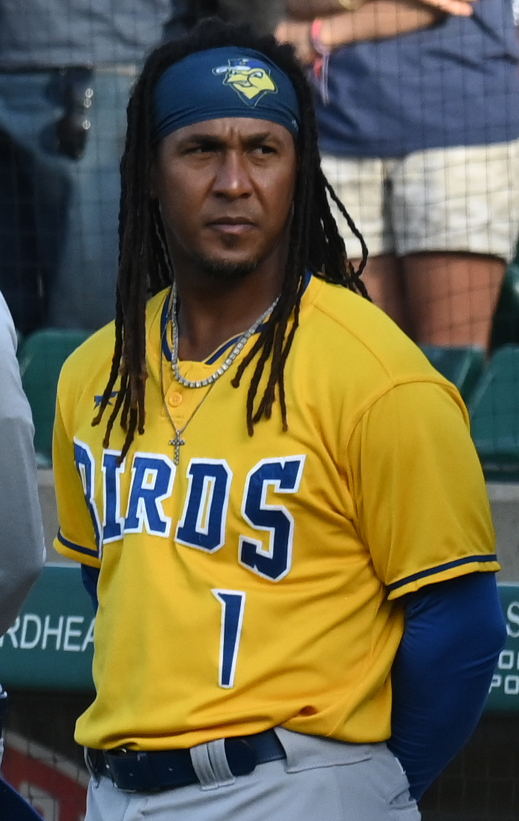
- Martínez with the Sioux Falls Canaries in 2022

Gary SouthShore RailCats – No. 2
- Shortstop
- Born: May 7, 1988 (age 38); Carolina, Puerto Rico
- Bats: Right Throws: Right

MLB debut
- September 19, 2010, for the Florida Marlins

MLB statistics (through 2011 season)
- Batting average: .258
- Home runs: 0
- Runs batted in: 3
- Stats at Baseball Reference

Teams
- Florida Marlins (2010–2011)
Medals
Men's baseball
Representing Puerto Rico
Pan American Games
| Gold medal – first place | 2019 Lima | Team |
Central American and Caribbean Games
| Gold medal – first place | 2018 Barranquilla | Team |
Caribbean Cup
| Bronze medal – third place | 2023 Puerto Rico | Team |

Osvaldo "Ozzie" Martínez (born May 7, 1988) is a Puerto Rican professional baseball shortstop for the Gary SouthShore RailCats of the American Association of Professional Baseball. He has previously played in Major League Baseball (MLB) for the Florida Marlins.

== Career ==
=== Florida Marlins ===
Martínez was drafted by the Florida Marlins in the 11th round of the 2006 Major League Baseball draft out of Porterville College. He was called up to the Majors for the first time on September 19, 2010, walking in his one at-bat as a pinch hitter. The following day, he started at shortstop for the Marlins against the St. Louis Cardinals and recorded his first hit, a single to center field off Chris Carpenter. He appeared in 14 games for the Marlins in 2010 and another 20 in 2011, with a combined batting average of .258.

=== Chicago White Sox ===
Martínez and Jhan Mariñez were sent to the Chicago White Sox on September 29, 2011 as compensation for the hiring of Ozzie Guillén by the Marlins, as Guillen had one year remaining on his contract with the White Sox.

=== Los Angeles Dodgers ===
On July 10, 2012, Martínez was traded to the Los Angeles Dodgers for cash considerations. With the Triple–A Albuquerque Isotopes, he played in 39 games and hit .255.

On November 23, 2012, he was resigned to the Los Angeles Dodgers on a minor league deal, with an invitation to spring training. He split the season between Albuquerque and the Double–A Chattanooga Lookouts, hitting .247 in 89 games.

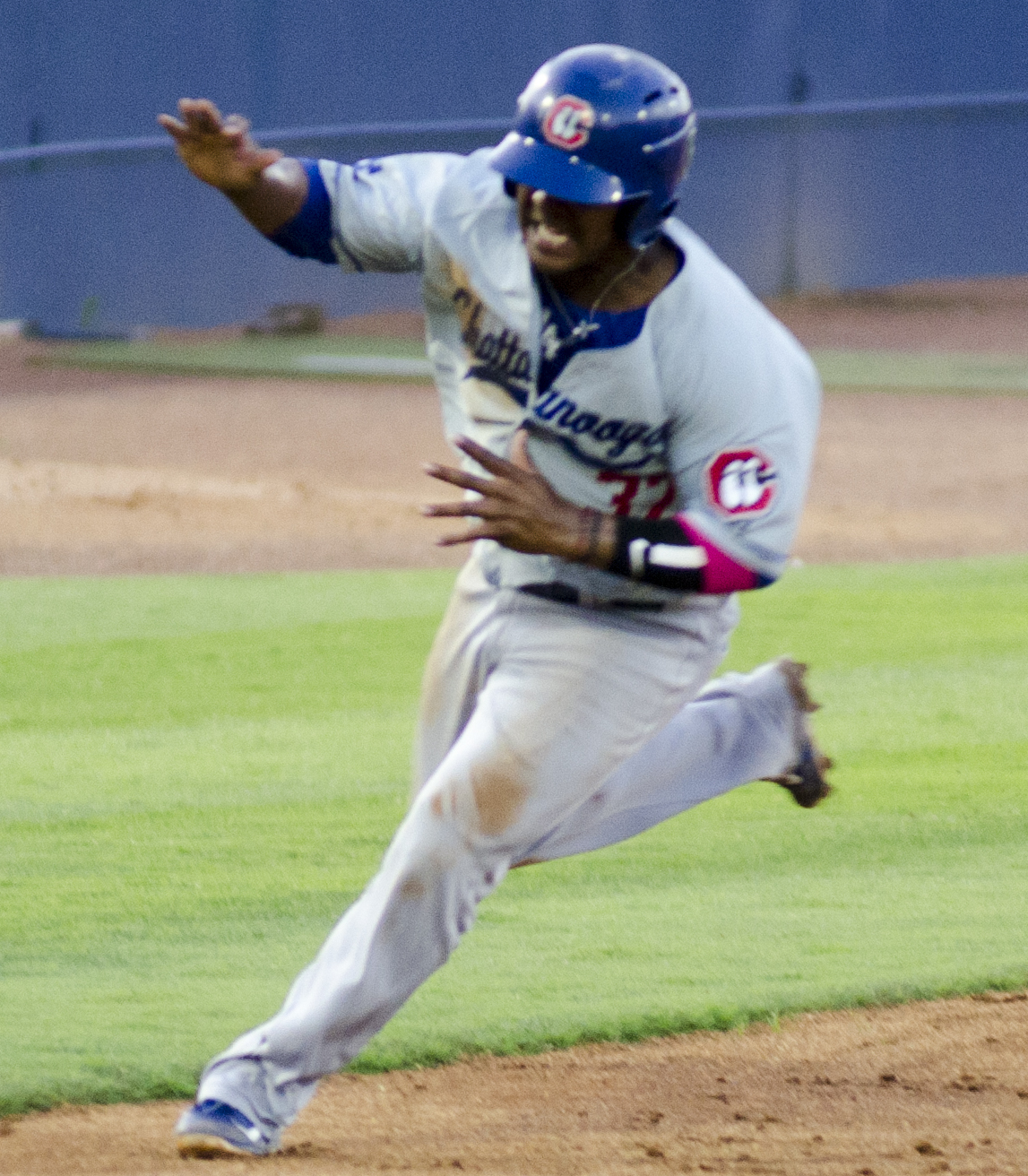
Martínez with the Chattanooga Lookouts in 2013

=== Atlanta Braves ===
On May 18, 2014, Martínez was traded to the Atlanta Braves, who assigned him to the Gwinnett Braves. In 78 games for Gwinnett, he batted .288/.340/.350 with no home runs and 22 RBI.

=== Baltimore Orioles ===
On November 18, 2014, Martínez signed a minor league contract with the Baltimore Orioles organization. In 2015, he played in 122 games for the Double-A Bowie Baysox, hitting .252/.310/.303 with 2 home runs and 30 RBI.

He re-signed with the team following the season, and was invited to major league Spring Training with the team in 2016. He did not make the team and played in 95 games for the Triple-A Norfolk Tides, batting .236/.271/.309 with 4 home runs and 34 RBI. He became a free agent following the season on November 7, 2016.

=== Chicago Cubs ===
On March 7, 2017, Martínez signed with the Sugar Land Skeeters of the Atlantic League of Professional Baseball.

On April 4, 2017, Martínez signed a minor league deal with the Chicago Cubs. He played in 61 games split between the Double-A Tennessee Smokies and the Triple-A Iowa Cubs, hitting a cumulative .240/.276/.302 with 2 home runs and 12 RBI. He elected free agency following the season on November 6.

=== Road Warriors ===
Martínez signed with the Road Warriors of the Atlantic League of Professional Baseball for the 2018 season. He was released on July 9, 2018, but re-signed with the team on August 2. In 105 total games for the Road Warriors, Martínez batted .256/.307/.347 with seven home runs and 27 RBI. Martínez became a free agent following the season.

=== New Britain Bees ===
On March 5, 2019, Martínez signed with the New Britain Bees of the Atlantic League of Professional Baseball. In 103 games for the Bees, he slashed .227/.293/.298 with three home runs and 27 RBI. Martínez became a free agent following the 2019 season.

=== Cleburne Railroaders ===
On February 24, 2021, Martínez signed with the Cleburne Railroaders of the American Association of Professional Baseball. In 89 games for Cleburne, he slashed .315/.368/.487 with 14 home runs and 56 RBI. Martínez was released by the Railroaders on December 2.

=== Sioux Falls Canaries ===
On May 21, 2022, Martínez signed with the Sioux Falls Canaries of the American Association of Professional Baseball. In 86 games he hit .271/.341/.356 with 6 home runs and 35 RBI. He was named an All-Star for Sioux Falls in 2022. He was released by the team on September 13.

On May 18, 2023, Martínez re-signed with the Canaries. In 71 games for Sioux Falls, he slashed .277/.352/.315 with two home runs, 22 RBI, and eight stolen bases. After the 2023 season, he became a free agent.

=== Sioux City Explorers ===
On May 24, 2024, Martínez signed with the Sioux City Explorers of the American Association of Professional Baseball. In 83 appearances for Sioux City, he batted .291/.367/.381 with five home runs, 42 RBI, and eight stolen bases. He became a free agent following the season.

=== Gary SouthShore RailCats ===
On August 4, 2026, Martinez signed with the Gary SouthShore RailCats of the American Association of Professional Baseball.
