= Yoanni Yera =

Cuban baseball player (born 1989)

Free agent
- Pitcher
- Born: October 18, 1989 (age 36); Martí, Matanzas, Cuba
- Bats: Left Throws: Left
- Stats at Baseball Reference
Medals
Men's baseball
Representing Cuba
Central American and Caribbean Games
Silver medal – second place	2018 Barranquilla	Team
Silver medal – second place	2023 San Salvador	Team
Caribbean Cup
Gold medal – first place	2023 Puerto Rico	Team

Yoanni Yera Montalvo (born October 18, 1989) is a Cuban professional baseball pitcher who is a free agent.

== Career ==
=== Kitchener Panthers ===
On June 7, 2019, Yera signed with the Kitchener Panthers of the Intercounty Baseball League (IBL). He made 12 starts for the team, recording a 7–1 record and 3.88 ERA with 87 strikeouts in 72 innings pitched. For his performance, Yera was named an All-Star for the 2019 season.

=== Olmecas de Tabasco ===
Yera signed with the Olmecas de Tabasco of the Mexican League for the 2020 season. Yera did not play in a game in 2020 due to the cancellation of the Mexican League season because of the COVID-19 pandemic.

On April 8, 2022, Yera re-signed with the Olmecas. On July 6, he threw a no-hitter in a game against the Generales de Durango. He finished the season with a 8–2 record, 3.01 ERA, and 88 strikeouts across 86 2/3 innings pitched.

In 2023, Yera registered a 4–3 record with a 2.90 ERA and 67 strikeouts in 68 1/3 innings pitched.

In 2024, Yera went 1–4 with a 4.82 ERA and 60 strikeouts across 61 2/3 innings.

In 2025, Yera posted a 6–6 record with a 4.50 ERA and 72 strikeouts in 90 innings pitched.

In 2026, Yera only made eight appearances, going 1–0 with a 3.72 ERA and 22 strikeouts in 19 1/3 innings pitched. On July 9, 2026, Yera was released by Tabasco.

== International career ==
Yera played for the Cuban national baseball team at 2017 World Baseball Classic.

He joined the Algodoneros de Guasave for the 2020 Mexican Pacific League season.
