= 2024 Caribbean Baseball Cup =

Tournament details
- Country: Bahamas
- Dates: 23–28 October
- Teams: 6

Final positions
- Champions: Curaçao (2nd title)
- Runners-up: U.S. Virgin Islands
- Third place: Cuba
- Fourth place: Sint Maarten

The 2024 Caribbean Baseball Cup was the fifth edition of the Caribbean Baseball Cup, an international baseball tournament organized the Caribbean Baseball Confederation (COCABE), a division of WBSC Americas.

The championship was held from 23 to 28 October 2024 in The Bahamas and was contested between six national teams: hosts Bahamas, Cuba, Curaçao, Dominican Republic, Sint Maarten, which made its international debut, and the United States Virgin Islands. All games were played at the Andre Rodgers National Baseball Stadium in Nassau.

Curaçao won the tournament by defeating the United States Virgin Islands 2–1 in the gold medal game. Cuba claimed the bronze medal with a 2–1 victory over debutants Sint Maarten. Hosts Bahamas finished last. All games were played over seven innings instead of the usual nine.

== Venue ==
(The Bahamas) Nassau
Andre Rodgers National Baseball Stadium
Capacity: 5,000
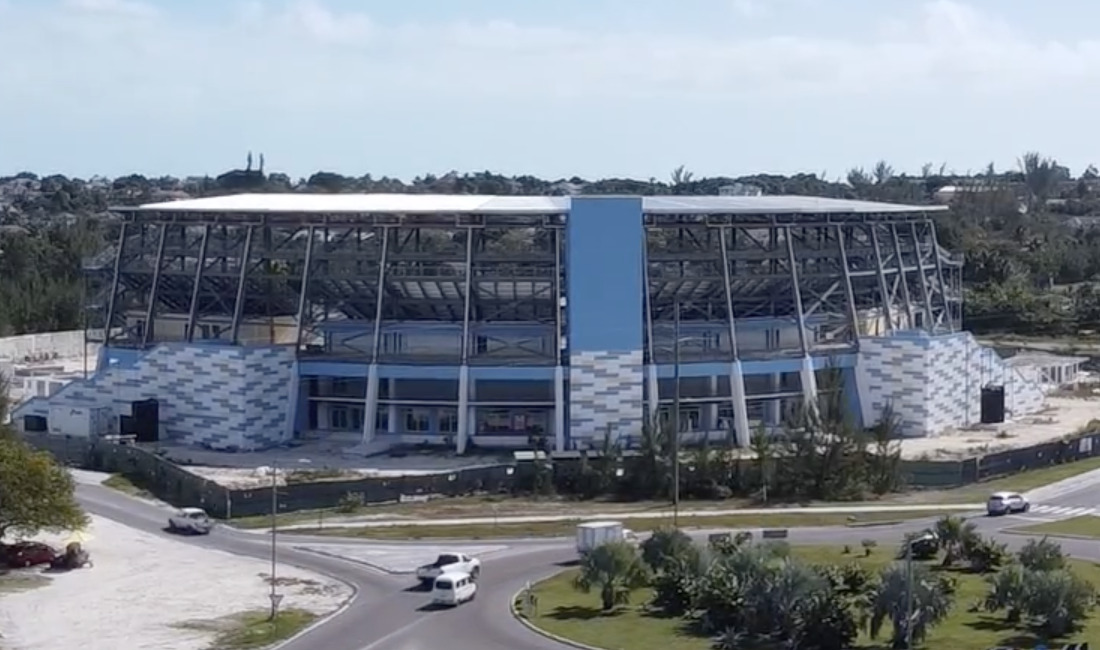

== Opening round ==
Pos	Team	Pld	W	L	RF	RA	RD	PCT	GB	Qualification
1	Curaçao	5	4	1	28	6	+22	.800	—	Advance to Gold medal game
2	U.S. Virgin Islands	5	3	2	23	19	+4	.600 (Note: U.S. Virgin Islands defeated Cuba, 6–5)	1	Advance to Gold medal game
3	Cuba	5	3	2	28	12	+16	.600	1	Advance to Bronze medal game
4	Sint Maarten	5	2	3	15	25	−10	.400 (Note: Sint Maarten defeated Dominican Republic, 2–1)	2	Advance to Bronze medal game
5	Dominican Republic	5	2	3	12	22	−10	.400	2	
6	Bahamas (H)	5	1	4	7	29	−22	.200	3	

Source: Caribbean Baseball Confederation
(H) Hosts

=== Results ===
23 October 2024; 11:00 (UTC–4)	Cuba	9 – 0	Sint Maarten	Andre Rodgers National Baseball Stadium, Nassau
23 October 2024; 11:00 (UTC–4)		Boxscore		Andre Rodgers National Baseball Stadium, Nassau

23 October 2024; 15:00 (UTC–4)	Dominican Republic	1 – 8	Curaçao	Andre Rodgers National Baseball Stadium, Nassau
23 October 2024; 15:00 (UTC–4)		Boxscore		Andre Rodgers National Baseball Stadium, Nassau

23 October 2024; 19:30 (UTC–4)	U.S. Virgin Islands	1 – 3	Bahamas	Andre Rodgers National Baseball Stadium, Nassau
23 October 2024; 19:30 (UTC–4)		Boxscore		Andre Rodgers National Baseball Stadium, Nassau

24 October 2024; 11:00 (UTC–4)	Dominican Republic	2 – 8	Cuba	Andre Rodgers National Baseball Stadium, Nassau
24 October 2024; 11:00 (UTC–4)		Boxscore		Andre Rodgers National Baseball Stadium, Nassau

24 October 2024; 15:00 (UTC–4)	U.S. Virgin Islands	3 – 2	Curaçao	Andre Rodgers National Baseball Stadium, Nassau
24 October 2024; 15:00 (UTC–4)		Boxscore		Andre Rodgers National Baseball Stadium, Nassau

24 October 2024; 19:00 (UTC–4)	Sint Maarten	8 – 0	Bahamas	Andre Rodgers National Baseball Stadium, Nassau
24 October 2024; 19:00 (UTC–4)		Boxscore		Andre Rodgers National Baseball Stadium, Nassau

25 October 2024; 11:00 (UTC–4)	Cuba	5 – 6	U.S. Virgin Islands	Andre Rodgers National Baseball Stadium, Nassau
25 October 2024; 11:00 (UTC–4)		Boxscore		Andre Rodgers National Baseball Stadium, Nassau

25 October 2024; 15:00 (UTC–4)	Sint Maarten	2 – 1	Dominican Republic	Andre Rodgers National Baseball Stadium, Nassau
25 October 2024; 15:00 (UTC–4)		Boxscore		Andre Rodgers National Baseball Stadium, Nassau

25 October 2024; 19:00 (UTC–4)	Bahamas	1 – 11 (F/5)	Curaçao	Andre Rodgers National Baseball Stadium, Nassau
25 October 2024; 19:00 (UTC–4)		Boxscore		Andre Rodgers National Baseball Stadium, Nassau

26 October 2024; 11:00 (UTC–4)	U.S. Virgin Islands	3 – 4	Dominican Republic	Andre Rodgers National Baseball Stadium, Nassau
26 October 2024; 11:00 (UTC–4)		Boxscore		Andre Rodgers National Baseball Stadium, Nassau

26 October 2024; 15:00 (UTC–4)	Curaçao	5 – 0	Sint Maarten	Andre Rodgers National Baseball Stadium, Nassau
26 October 2024; 15:00 (UTC–4)		Boxscore		Andre Rodgers National Baseball Stadium, Nassau

26 October 2024; 19:00 (UTC–4)	Bahamas	2 – 5	Cuba	Andre Rodgers National Baseball Stadium, Nassau
26 October 2024; 19:00 (UTC–4)		Boxscore		Andre Rodgers National Baseball Stadium, Nassau

27 October 2024; 11:00 (UTC–4)	Sint Maarten	5 – 10	U.S. Virgin Islands	Andre Rodgers National Baseball Stadium, Nassau
27 October 2024; 11:00 (UTC–4)		Boxscore		Andre Rodgers National Baseball Stadium, Nassau

27 October 2024; 15:00 (UTC–4)	Curaçao	2 – 1	Cuba	Andre Rodgers National Baseball Stadium, Nassau
27 October 2024; 15:00 (UTC–4)		Boxscore		Andre Rodgers National Baseball Stadium, Nassau

27 October 2024; 19:00 (UTC–4)	Dominican Republic	4 – 1	Bahamas	Andre Rodgers National Baseball Stadium, Nassau
27 October 2024; 19:00 (UTC–4)		Boxscore		Andre Rodgers National Baseball Stadium, Nassau

== Medal games ==
=== Bronze medal game ===
28 October 2024; 15:00 (UTC–4)	Sint Maarten	1 – 2	Cuba	Andre Rodgers National Baseball Stadium, Nassau
28 October 2024; 15:00 (UTC–4)		Boxscore		Andre Rodgers National Baseball Stadium, Nassau

=== Gold medal game ===
28 October 2024; 19:00 (UTC–4)	U.S. Virgin Islands	1 – 2 (F/8)	Curaçao	Andre Rodgers National Baseball Stadium, Nassau
28 October 2024; 19:00 (UTC–4)		Boxscore		Andre Rodgers National Baseball Stadium, Nassau

== Final standings ==
Pos	Team	W	L
Gold medal	Curaçao	5	1
Silver medal	U.S. Virgin Islands	3	3
Bronze medal	Cuba	4	2
4	Sint Maarten	2	4
5	Dominican Republic	2	3
6	Bahamas	1	4

== Statistical leaders ==
=== Batting ===
Statistic	Name	Total
AVG	(Dominican Republic) Francisco González	.500
AVG	(United States Virgin Islands) Izzy Wilson	.500
H	(Dominican Republic) Randy Francisco	8
H	(Sint Maarten) Alex Madera	8
R	(United States Virgin Islands) Zayd Brannigan	6
HR	4 tied with	1
RBI	(Curaçao) Darren Seferina	8
SB	(Sint Maarten) Alex Madera	4

Source: COCABE

=== Pitching ===
Statistic	Name	Total
W	15 tied with	1
L	15 tied with	1
SV	(Cuba) Rafael Perdomo	1
SV	(Dominican Republic) Cristopher Rodríguez	1
IP	(United States Virgin Islands) Jordan Scott	11.0
ERA	(Curaçao) Jeandrick Lourens	0.00
ERA	(Sint Maarten) Daniel Vos	0.00
SO	(Cuba) José Ignacio Bermúdez	14

Source: COCABE
