= Nelmerson Angela =

Curaçaoan baseball player (born 1998)

Nelmerson Xavier Angela

Twins Oosterhout – No. 27
- Pitcher
- Born: February 20, 1998 (age 28); Willemstad, Curaçao
- Bats: Left Throws: Left
- Stats at Baseball Reference
Medals
Men's baseball
Representing Curaçao
Caribbean Cup
Gold medal – first place	2021 Curaçao	Team
Bronze medal – third place	2022 Bahamas	Team
Gold medal – first place	2025 Bahamas	Team

Nelmerson Xavier Mariano Silvano Angela (born February 20, 1998) is a Curaçaoan professional baseball player for the Curaçao national team and Twins Oosterhout of the Honkbal Hoofdklasse. He pitched in the Dominican Summer League for four seasons before playing baseball in the Netherlands.

== Career ==
=== New York Mets ===
On May 25, 2015, Angela signed with the New York Mets as an international free agent. That summer, he pitched for the Dominican Summer League (DSL) Mets, where he was 2–1 with a 2.70 earned run average (ERA) and 14 strikeouts in 13 1/3 innings pitched out of the bullpen across eight outings. In 2016, Angela returned to the DSL Mets and compiled a 3–0 record, 1.88 ERA, 37 strikeouts, two saves, and a 0.89 walks plus hits per inning pitched in 14 games, including six starts.

In 2017, Angels once again returned to the DSL Mets, going 2–0 with a 1.90 ERA and 21 strikeouts in ten games (five starts). He returned to the DSL Mets for a fourth consecutive season in 2018. In 16 relief appearances for the team, he had a 3–1 record and 2.37 ERA with 33 strikeouts and one save across 30 1/3 innings pitched. The Mets organization released Angela on September 4.

=== Oltretorrente ===
Angela signed with Oltretorrente of Serie A2 in Italy in February 2019.

=== Honkbal Hoofdklasse ===
==== Silicon Storks ====
Angela signed with the Silicon Storks of the Honkbal Hoofdklasse prior to the 2021 season. In 14 games pitched (11 starts), he had a 3–6 record and 4.75 ERA with 58 strikeouts across 77 2/3 innings pitched.

==== Amsterdam Pirates ====
On December 3, 2021, Angela signed with the Amsterdam Pirates. In 14 appearances (12 starts) for Amsterdam in 2022, he logged a 6–1 record and 2.53 ERA with 61 strikeouts over 78 1/3 innings pitched. Angela pitched in 17 games (16 starts) for the Pirates in 2023 , with a 7–4 record and 1.99 ERA with 54 strikeouts across 99 2/3 innings pitched. Angela pitched the final seven innings for Amsterdam as they won the 2023 Holland Series.

In 2024, Angela made 15 appearances (13 starts) for Amsterdam, where he had a 4–3 record and 2.12 ERA with 48 strikeouts across 80 2/3 innings pitched. On November 18, it was announced that Angela would not return to the Pirates in 2025.

==== HCAW ====
On November 19, 2024, Angela signed with the HCAW. He made 14 appearances (including 13 starts) for the team in 2025, with an 8–4 record, 1.12 ERA, and 86 strikeouts across 88 1/3 innings pitched.

==== Oosterhout Twins ====
On February 23, 2026, Angela signed with the Twins Oosterhout of the Honkbal Hoofdklasse.

== International career ==
Angela was named to the Netherlands national team for the 2017 World Baseball Classic, but he did not pitch in the tournament. He was named to the Dutch team for the 2018 U-23 Baseball World Cup. He had a 9.64 ERA in two games.

Angela pitched for the Curaçao national team in the 2021 Caribbean Baseball Cup and was the winning pitcher as Curaçao won the bronze medal at the 2022 Caribbean Baseball Cup. He was named the most valuable player of the 2025 Caribbean Cup after going 2–0 for the team's second consecutive tournament title. He also pitched for Curacao in the 2019 World Port Tournament, 2022 Haarlem Baseball Week, and 2026 Central American and Caribbean Games.
