= Andrés Santiago =

Puerto Rican baseball player (born 1989)

Free agent
- Pitcher
- Born: October 26, 1989 (age 36); Cataño, Puerto Rico
- Bats: Right Throws: Right
- Stats at Baseball Reference
Medals
Men's baseball
Representing Puerto Rico
World Baseball Classic
Silver medal – second place	2013 San Francisco	Team
Silver medal – second place	2017 Los Angeles	Team
Caribbean Cup
Bronze medal – third place	2023 Puerto Rico	Team
Caribbean Series
Gold medal – first place	2017 Culiacán	Criollos de Caguas
Gold medal – first place	2018 Guadalajara	Criollos de Caguas

Andrés Manuel Santiago (born October 26, 1989) is a professional baseball pitcher who is a free agent.

== Professional career ==
=== Los Angeles Dodgers ===
Santiago was drafted by the Los Angeles Dodgers in the 3rd round, with the 87th overall selection, of the 2007 Major League Baseball draft. He signed for a signing bonus of $1.2 million dollars. Santiago spent his first seasons in the rookie leagues, playing with the rookie-level Gulf Coast League Dodgers and later the rookie-level Arizona League Dodgers.

In 2011, Santiago was promoted to the California League with the High-A Rancho Cucamonga Quakes. In 28 appearances (20 starts) for the Quakes, he registered an 8-5 record and 5.03 ERA with 113 strikeouts across 121 2/3 innings pitched. Santiago split the 2012 season between the Double-A Chattanooga Lookouts and Rancho Cucamonga. In 22 games (18 starts) for the two affiliates, he accumulated a 6-5 record and 3.69 ERA with 122 strikeouts across 112 1/3 innings pitched.

Santiago spent the 2013 season with Chattanooga, posting a 5-12 record and 4.97 ERA with 109 strikeouts in 134 innings of work across 30 games (25 starts). On August 28, 2014, while Santiago was playing for Chattanooga, he tossed a no-hitter against the Tennessee Smokies, striking out 12 batters. In 26 total appearances (24 starts) for Chattanooga, he posted a 6-8 record and 4.47 ERA with 98 strikeouts over 129 innings of work.

=== Chicago Cubs ===
On December 31, 2014, Santiago signed a minor league contract with the Chicago Cubs. In 26 appearances split between the Double-A Tennessee Smokies and Triple-A Iowa Cubs, he registered a 4-5 record and 3.89 ERA with 55 strikeouts across 78 2/3 innings pitched. Santiago elected free agency following the season on November 6, 2015.

=== Sussex County Miners ===
Santiago began the 2016 season with the Sussex County Miners of the Can-Am League. In 22 appearances (8 starts) for the Miners, Santiago compiled a 2-6 record and 4.50 ERA with 55 strikeouts and 6 saves over 60 innings of work.

=== New Jersey Jackals ===
On July 30, 2016, Santiago was traded to the New Jersey Jackals of the Can-Am League. In 6 games for the Jackals, he posted a 2.57 ERA with 7 strikeouts and 2 saves over 7 innings.

=== Atlanta Braves ===
On March 20, 2017, Santiago signed a minor league contract with the Atlanta Braves organization. He split the year between the Single-A Rome Braves, High-A Florida Fire Frogs, Double-A Mississippi Braves, and Triple-A Gwinnett Braves. In 26 appearances (7 starts) for the four affiliates, Santiago compiled a cumulative 4-8 record and 5.38 ERA with 72 strikeouts across 75 1/3 innings pitched.

Santiago spent the 2018 season with Mississippi and Gwinnett, posting an aggregate 6-6 record and 4.61 ERA with 78 strikeouts in 105 1/3 innings pitched across 26 games (15 starts). Santiago split 2019 between Mississippi and Gwinnett, accumulating a 2-2 record and 5.53 ERA with 31 strikeouts across 19 games (7 starts). Santiago was released by the Braves organization on July 22, 2019.

== International career ==
Santiago played for the Puerto Rican National Team in the 2013 World Baseball Classic. & 2017 World Baseball Classic.

Santiago played in 2 Pan American Games (2011 México and 2015 Toronto), a World Cup (2011 Panama), 5 Caribbean Series for Puerto Rico (2013, 2015, 2016, 2017, 2018), Premier12 (2015 Japan, Taiwan, Taipei) (2019 Korea, Taiwan) (2024 México).

Santiago beat Italy in the 2015 Premier12 tournament in Taiwan tossing 7 scoreless innings and striking out 6 to give Puerto Rico the first win of the tournament. Santiago later pitch 6 2/3 of work against Chinese Taipei, striking 5 batters to help Puerto Rico advance to the quarterfinals.

Santiago won the Closer of the Year award in the Venezuelan Winter League for Caribes de Anzoátegui, and the championship in same year (2017). Santiago has won two Caribbean Series championships while participating in six. His victory over the Dominican Republic in 2018 help Puerto Rico win their second consecutive championship.
