= Chavez Young =

Bahamian baseball player (born 1997)

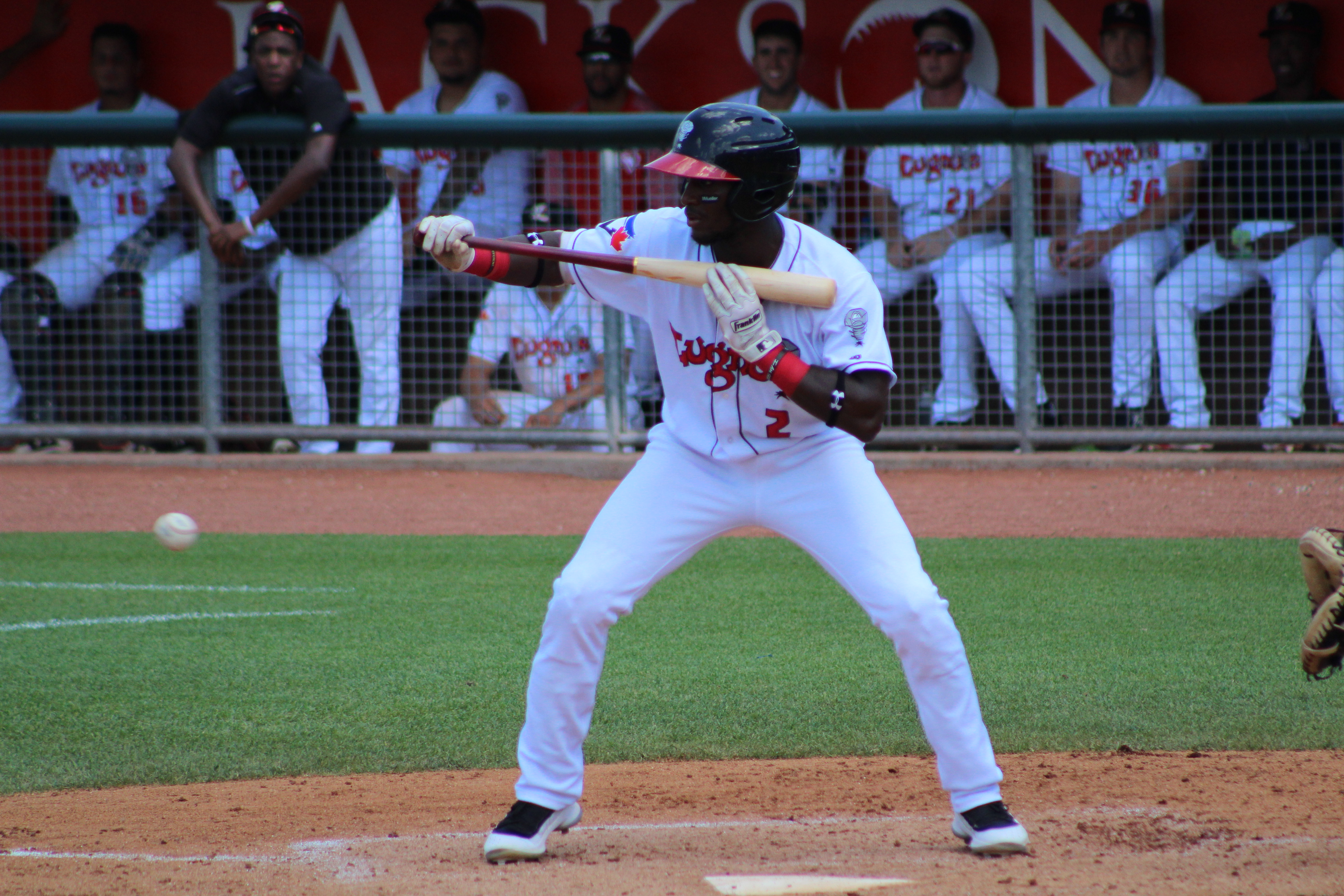
- Young with the Lansing Lugnuts in 2018

Québec Capitales – No. 1
- Outfielder
- Born: July 8, 1997 (age 29); Freeport, The Bahamas
- Bats: Switch Throws: Right
Medals
Men's baseball
Representing Bahamas
Caribbean Cup
Silver medal – second place	2025 Bahamas	Team

Chavez Young (born July 8, 1997) is a Bahamian professional baseball outfielder for the Québec Capitales of the Frontier League.

== Career ==
Young moved to the United States when he was 15, and attended Faith Baptist Christian Academy in Brandon, Florida, for two years. In his final year of high school, Young attended the same school in Ludowici, Georgia.

=== Toronto Blue Jays ===
Young was drafted by the Toronto Blue Jays in the 39th round, with the 1,182nd overall selection, of the 2016 Major League Baseball draft. He was assigned to the Rookie-level Gulf Coast League Blue Jays upon signing, and batted .274 with six runs batted in (RBI) and six stolen bases in 21 games played. Young played the 2017 season with the Rookie Advanced Bluefield Blue Jays and Low–A Vancouver Canadians. In 67 total games, he hit .283 with four home runs and 30 RBI.

Chavez was assigned to the Single–A Lansing Lugnuts for the entire 2018 season. He was named a mid-season All-Star after hitting .307 with 18 doubles, two home runs, and 18 stolen bases. In total, Young played in 125 games for the Lugnuts in 2018, and hit .285 with 33 doubles, nine triples, eight home runs, 57 RBI, and 44 stolen bases.

Young spent the 2019 season with the High–A Dunedin Blue Jays, playing in 111 games and hitting .247/.315/.354 with 6 home runs, 43 RBI, and 24 stolen bases. He did not play in a game in 2020 due to the cancellation of the minor league season because of the COVID-19 pandemic.

Young returned to action in 2021 with the Double–A New Hampshire Fisher Cats, playing in 79 games and batting .265/.350/.409 with seven home runs, 52 RBI, and 20 stolen bases. He split the 2022 season with the Triple–A Buffalo Bisons, also playing in five games for Dunedin. In 65 games for the Bisons, Young hit .234/.331/.351 with five home runs, 21 RBI, and 20 stolen bases.

=== Pittsburgh Pirates ===
On January 10, 2023, Young was traded to the Pittsburgh Pirates in exchange for Zach Thompson. Prior to the MLB regular season, Young was a member of team Great Britain in the 2023 World Baseball Classic (WBC). He went 1 for 3 with 2 RBIs in Great Britain's 7–5 victory over Colombia on March 13, 2023, marking Great Britain's first ever win in the WBC.

Young split the season between the Double–A Altoona Curve and the Triple–A Indianapolis Indians. In 102 total games, he hit a combined .202/.326/.308 with 5 home runs, 34 RBI, and 32 stolen bases. He elected free agency following the season on November 6.

=== Milwaukee Brewers ===
On January 22, 2024, Young signed a minor league contract with the Milwaukee Brewers. In 47 games for the Triple–A Nashville Sounds, he batted .210/.302/.324 with two home runs, 18 RBI, and seven stolen bases. On June 21, Young was released by the Brewers organization.

=== Kansas City Monarchs ===
On July 13, 2024, Young signed with the Kansas City Monarchs of the American Association of Professional Baseball. In 17 games for the Monarchs, Young batted .247/.337/.356 with one home run, nine RBI, and nine stolen bases.

=== Lake Country DockHounds ===
On August 3, 2024, Young was traded to the Lake Country DockHounds in exchange for a player to be named later. In 25 appearances for the team, he slashed .393/.444/.617 with three home runs, 16 RBI, and 13 stolen bases.

On March 5, 2025, Young signed with the Acereros de Monclova of the Mexican League. However, on April 11, Young re-signed with Lake Country and remained there the rest of the season.

=== Québec Capitales ===
In early 2026, Young signed with the Québec Capitales of the independent Frontier League.
