= 2022 Haarlem Baseball Week =

Tournament details
- Country: Netherlands
- City: Haarlem
- Dates: 8–15 July
- Teams: 6

Final positions
- Champions: Netherlands (5th title)
- Runners-up: Curaçao
- Third place: United States
- Fourth place: Japan

Tournament statistics
- Games played: 20
- Best BA: (Japan) Takuma Hayashi & (Curaçao) Juremi Profar (.412)
- Most HRs: Three tied (Note: Roger Bernadina, Jacob Gonzalez and Yohandy Morales) (3)
- Most SBs: (Japan) Kota Yazawa (3)
- Best ERA: Six tied (0.00)
- Most Ks (as pitcher): (Japan) Minato Aoyama (15)

Awards
- MVP: (Netherlands) Roger Bernadina

The 2022 Haarlem Baseball Week was an international baseball competition held at the Pim Mulier Stadium in Haarlem, the Netherlands from 8–15 July 2022. It was the 30th edition of the tournament.

Netherlands became champions for the fifth time, beating Curaçao in the final who debuted this tournament.

== Teams ==
A usual number of six teams were invited to the tournament.

Cuba	15th appearance
Curaçao	2nd appearance
Italy	6th appearance
Japan	16th appearance
Netherlands	Host nation
United States	9th appearance

== Opening round ==
=== Standings ===
Teams	W	L	Pct.	GB
Japan	5	0	1.000	—
Curaçao	3	2	.600	2
United States	3	2	.600	2
Netherlands	2	3	.400	3
Italy	2	3	.400	3
Cuba	0	5	.000	5

== Final round ==
14 July 2022 - 5th/6th place	Italy	1 – 5	Cuba	Pim Mulier Stadium, Haarlem
14 July 2022 - 5th/6th place		Boxscore		Pim Mulier Stadium, Haarlem

14 July 2022 - Semi Final 1	Curaçao	3 – 2 (F/10)	United States	Pim Mulier Stadium, Haarlem
14 July 2022 - Semi Final 1		Boxscore		Pim Mulier Stadium, Haarlem

14 July 2022 - Semi Final 2	Japan	1 – 2	Netherlands	Pim Mulier Stadium, Haarlem
14 July 2022 - Semi Final 2		Boxscore		Pim Mulier Stadium, Haarlem

15 July 2022 - Bronze Medal Game	Japan	1 – 5	United States	Pim Mulier Stadium, Haarlem
15 July 2022 - Bronze Medal Game		Boxscore		Pim Mulier Stadium, Haarlem

15 July 2022 - Championship Game	Netherlands	6 – 1	Curaçao	Pim Mulier Stadium, Haarlem
15 July 2022 - Championship Game		Boxscore		Pim Mulier Stadium, Haarlem

== Final standings ==
Rk	Team
1	Netherlands
2	Curaçao
3	United States
4	Japan
5	Cuba
6	Italy

2022 Haarlem Baseball Week champions

Netherlands
5th title
