= Andre Rodgers =

Bahamian baseball player (1934–2004)

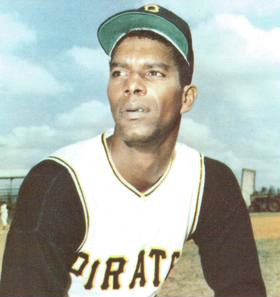
- Rodgers in 1966
- Shortstop
- Born: December 2, 1934; Nassau, The Bahamas
- Died: December 13, 2004 (aged 70); Nassau, The Bahamas
- Batted: Right Threw: Right

MLB debut
- April 16, 1957, for the New York Giants

Last MLB appearance
- September 30, 1967, for the Pittsburgh Pirates

MLB statistics
- Batting average: .249
- Home runs: 45
- Runs batted in: 245

NPB statistics
- Batting average: .210
- Home runs: 4
- Runs batted in: 12
- Stats at Baseball Reference

Teams
- New York / San Francisco Giants (1957–1960); Chicago Cubs (1961–1964); Pittsburgh Pirates (1965–1967); Taiyo Whales (1969)

Kenneth Andre Ian Rodgers (December 2, 1934 – December 13, 2004) was a Bahamian professional baseball shortstop. He played in Major League Baseball (MLB) for the New York / San Francisco Giants (1957–1960), Chicago Cubs (1961–1964), and Pittsburgh Pirates (1965–1967). He also played one season in Nippon Professional Baseball (NPB) for the Taiyo Whales (1969). He batted and threw right-handed, stood 6 feet 3 inches (1.91 m) tall and weighed 200 pounds (91 kg) (14 stone, 4).

== Career ==
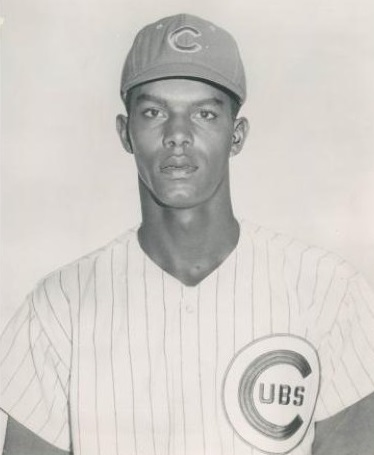
Rodgers in 1964

A native of Nassau, Bahamas, Rodgers was the first Bahamian to play in the integrated major leagues (though Ormond Sampson, who debuted in 1932, played in the Negro leagues). He was a talented cricket player who paid his own way for a tryout with the Giants in 1954. Rodgers failed to make the team that year. He had to learn the rules of baseball, not to jump away from curveballs, and consequently, he adjusted and made his debut in 1957. Rodgers was a part of the Giants roster until October 1960 when he was traded to the Milwaukee Braves for Alvin Dark, who ultimately became the San Francisco manager at the time.

Before the 1961 season started, the Braves traded Rodgers to the Cubs. In 1962, he became the regular Cubs shortstop when Ernie Banks moved to first base. In that season, Rodgers, second baseman Ken Hubbs and Banks set a league record for double plays. After four productive seasons for the Cubs, Rodgers was traded to the Pirates.

In an 11-year career, Rodgers compiled a .249 batting average with 45 home runs and 245 RBI in 854 games. But even more important than the success he accomplished in his career was the fact that he opened the door for countrymen to follow, such as Ed Armbrister, Tony Curry, Wenty Ford, and Wil Culmer. Indeed, in the immediate years following his success, baseball began to emerge as the most popular sport in the Bahamas, and, in the 1960s, had become even more popular than cricket.

Andre Rodgers died in Nassau at the age of 70. Andre Rodgers National Baseball Stadium, which opened at Nassau's Queen Elizabeth Sports Centre in 2022, is named in his honour.
