= Omar López =

Omar López may refer to:

- Omar López (baseball) (born 1977), Venezuelan baseball coach and former player
- Omar R. Lopez (fl. 1995-present), American special agent and attorney
