= 2023 Caribbean Baseball Cup =

Tournament details
- Country: Puerto Rico
- Dates: 2–8 October
- Teams: 4

Final positions
- Champions: Cuba (1st title)
- Runner-up: Curaçao
- Third place: Puerto Rico
- Fourth place: U.S. Virgin Islands

The 2023 Caribbean Baseball Cup was the fourth edition of the Caribbean Baseball Cup, an international baseball tournament organized the Caribbean Baseball Confederation (COCABE), a division of WBSC Americas. The championship was held from 2 to 8 October 2023 in Puerto Rico and was contested in a round-robin format between four national teams: hosts Puerto Rico, Cuba, Curaçao and the United States Virgin Islands.

The schedule initially included six games per team; however, due to heavy rains, only four games per team were played. All games were played over seven innings instead of the usual nine.

Cuba won the championship undefeated with a 4–0 record. Curaçao and Puerto Rico both finished with a 2–2 record, but since Curaçao defeated Puerto Rico 3–0, they secured the silver medal, while Puerto Rico settled for bronze. The U.S. Virgin Islands lost all their games, finishing fourth with a 0–4 record.

== Venues ==
(Puerto Rico) Las Piedras	(Puerto Rico) Fajardo
Estadio Francisco Negrón	Estadio Concepción Pérez Alberto
Capacity: 4,500	Capacity: 5,000

== Round robin ==
Pos	Team	Pld	W	L	RF	RA	RD	PCT	GB
1	Cuba	4	4	0	0	0	0	1.000	—
2	Curaçao	4	2	2	0	0	0	.500 (Note: Curaçao defeated Puerto Rico, 3–0)	2
3	Puerto Rico (H)	4	2	2	0	0	0	.500	2
4	U.S. Virgin Islands	4	0	4	0	0	0	.000	4

Source: COCABE
(H) Hosts

=== Results ===
2 October 2023; 15:30 (UTC–4)	U.S. Virgin Islands	1 – 11 (F/6)	Cuba	Estadio Concepción Pérez Alberto, Fajardo

2 October 2023; 19:30 (UTC–4)	Curaçao	3 – 0	Puerto Rico	Estadio Concepción Pérez Alberto, Fajardo

6 October 2023; 11:00 (UTC–4)	Cuba	4 – 0	Curaçao	Estadio Concepción Pérez Alberto, Fajardo

6 October 2023; 14:00 (UTC–4)	Puerto Rico	8 – 0	U.S. Virgin Islands	Estadio Concepción Pérez Alberto, Fajardo

7 October 2023; 11:00 (UTC–4)	Curaçao	16 – 2 (F/5)	U.S. Virgin Islands	Estadio Concepción Pérez Alberto, Fajardo

7 October 2023; 14:00 (UTC–4)	Puerto Rico	2 – 4	Cuba	Estadio Concepción Pérez Alberto, Fajardo

7 October 2023; 13:00 (UTC–4)	U.S. Virgin Islands	3 – 5	Puerto Rico	Estadio Francisco Negrón, Las Piedras

7 October 2023; 17:00 (UTC–4)	Curaçao	1 – 3	Cuba	Estadio Concepción Pérez Alberto, Fajardo

== Statistical leaders ==
=== Batting ===
Statistic	Name	Total
AVG	(United States Virgin Islands) Conroy Samuel	.636
H	(United States Virgin Islands) Conroy Samuel	7
R	(Cuba) Roberto Baldoquín	6
HR	(Puerto Rico) Abdel Guadalupe	2
RBI	(Cuba) Erisbel Arruebarrena	6
SLG	(Cuba) Roberto Baldoquín	1.000

Source: COCABE

=== Pitching ===
Statistic	Name	Total
W	(Cuba) Yoanni Yera	2
L	8 tied with	1
SV	4 tied with	1
IP	(Cuba) Yoanni Yera	10.0
ERA	(Cuba) José Ramón Rodríguez	0.00
ERA	(Puerto Rico) Andrés Santiago	0.00
SO	(Cuba) Yoanni Yera	19

Source: COCABE
