= Andre Rodgers National Baseball Stadium =

Baseball stadium in Nassau, Bahamas

Coordinates: 25°3′15.77″N 77°21′36.78″W

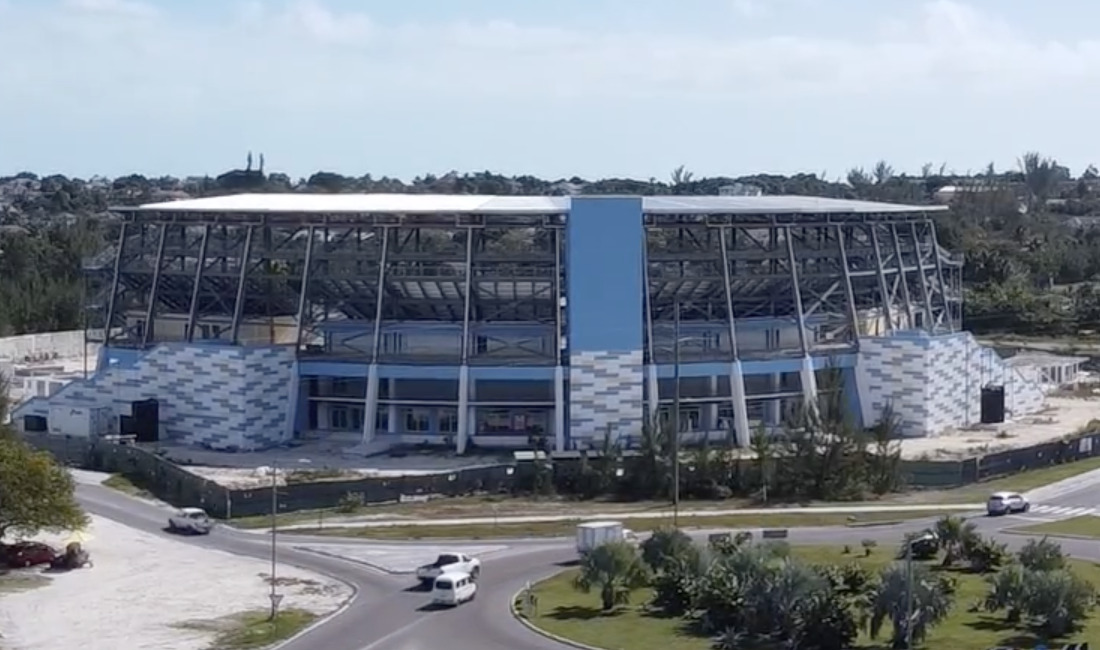
- The stadium in February 2022
- Interactive map of Andre Rodgers National Baseball Stadium
- Location: Queen Elizabeth Sports Centre; Nassau, New Providence, Bahamas
- Owner: Bahamas Ministry of Youth, Sports, and Culture
- Capacity: 5,000
- Surface: Grass

Construction
- Opened: 2022
- Structural engineer: AMC Consultants

Tenant
- Bahamas national baseball team

Andre Rodgers National Baseball Stadium is a baseball stadium in Nassau, Bahamas. Opening in 2022, it is the largest baseball-specific stadium in the country, and is built to international and Major League Baseball standards.

Andre Rodgers Stadium hosted the 2022 Caribbean Baseball Cup, a qualifying tournament for the 2023 Central American and Caribbean Games. It is also set to host the Caribbean Baseball Cup in October 2024, as well as the U-15 Baseball World Cup in August 2024.

The stadium is named after Andre Rodgers, one of the first Bahamians to play in Major League Baseball. (Note: Since MLB recognized seven Negro leagues from 1920 to 1948 as "major leagues" in December 2020, Ormond Sampson is now considered the first Bahamian major leaguer.)
