= Pedro Fernandez (baseball) =

Dominican baseball player (born 1994)

Pedro Fernández

Rakuten Monkeys – No. 49
- Pitcher
- Born: May 25, 1994 (age 32); Puerto Plata, Dominican Republic
- Bats: Right Throws: Right

CPBL debut
- September 2, 2023, for the Rakuten Monkeys

CPBL statistics (through 2025 season)
- Win–loss record: 29–11
- Earned run average: 2.63
- Strikeouts: 334
- Stats at Baseball Reference

Teams
- Rakuten Monkeys (2023–present)

Career highlights and awards
- Taiwan Series champion (2025)

Pedro Arsenio Fernández Echavarría (born May 25, 1994) is a Dominican professional baseball pitcher for the Rakuten Monkeys of the Chinese Professional Baseball League (CPBL).

== Career ==
=== Kansas City Royals ===
On September 2, 2011, Fernandez signed with the Kansas City Royals as an international free agent. He made his professional debut in 2012 with the Dominican Summer League Royals, posting a 1.93 ERA over 12 games. Fernandez split the 2013 season between the DSL Royals and the rookie-level Arizona League Royals, recording a combined 1.54 ERA with 53 strikeouts across 46 2/3 innings pitched.

Fernandez spent the 2014 campaign with the Single-A Lexington Legends. In 16 appearances (8 starts) for Lexington, he compiled a 1–8 record and 4.99 ERA with 60 strikeouts and three saves across 61 1/3 innings pitched. Fernandez split the 2015 season between Single-A Lexington and the High-A Wilmington Blue Rocks. In 25 appearances (20 starts) for the two affiliates, he posted a cumulative 6–8 record and 4.80 ERA with 114 strikeouts across 110 2/3 innings pitched. Fernandez spent 2016 with Wilmington and the Double-A Northwest Arkansas Naturals, registering a combined 4–3 record and 3.02 ERA with 50 strikeouts in 62 2/3 innings pitched across 14 games (11 starts).

In 2017, Fernandez played for Double-A Northwest Arkansas and the Triple-A Omaha Storm Chasers, registering a combined 6–4 record and 3.16 ERA with 67 strikeouts over 39 contests. He split the 2018 season between the two affiliates as well, compiling a 5–2 record and 3.38 ERA with 49 strikeouts in 66 2/3 innings pitched across 32 games. Fernandez elected free agency following the season on November 2, 2018.

=== Algodoneros de Unión Laguna ===
On April 23, 2019, Fernandez signed with the Algodoneros de Unión Laguna of the Mexican League. In 13 appearances (5 starts) for the team, he struggled to a 2–4 record and 8.27 ERA with 18 strikeouts across 32 2/3 innings pitched. Fernandez was released by the Algodoneros on June 29.

=== Tigres de Quintana Roo ===
On April 21, 2022, after several years of inactivity, Fernandez signed with the Tigres de Quintana Roo of the Mexican League. In 17 starts for Quintana Roo, Fernandez compiled an 8–4 record and 4.42 ERA with 103 strikeouts across 95 2/3 innings pitched.

=== Milwaukee Brewers ===
On January 23, 2023, Fernandez signed a minor league contract with the Milwaukee Brewers. In 21 appearances (10 starts) for the Triple-A Nashville Sounds, he posted a 3–3 record and 4.05 ERA with 57 strikeouts across 66 2/3 innings pitched. Fernandez was released by the Brewers organization on August 1.

=== Rakuten Monkeys ===
On August 14, 2023, Fernandez signed with the Rakuten Monkeys of the Chinese Professional Baseball League. In 8 starts down the stretch, he posted a 4–1 record and 2.09 ERA with 53 strikeouts across 51 2/3 innings pitched.

On January 18, 2024, Fernandez re-signed with the Monkeys. In 29 starts for Rakuten, he compiled a 10–10 record and 3.68 ERA with 130 strikeouts over 171 innings of work.

On January 2, 2025, Fernandez re-signed with the Monkeys for a third consecutive season. In 26 starts for the team, he compiled a 15–2 record and 2.01 ERA with 168 strikeouts over 170 innings of work. With the Monkeys, Fernandez won the 2025 Taiwan Series.

On December 8, 2025, Fernandez re-signed with the Monkeys on a two-year contract spanning the 2026 and 2027 seasons.
