= Cuba national baseball team =

National sports team

Information
- Country: Cuba
- Federation: Baseball Federation of Cuba
- Confederation: WBSC Americas
- Manager: Germán Mesa
- Captain: Alfredo Despaigne

WBSC ranking
- Current: 12 (26 October 2026)
- Highest: 1 (December 2012)
- Lowest: 11 (2 times; latest in August 2021)
Home	Away	Alternate

Olympic Games
- Appearances: 5 (first in 1992)
- Best result: (gold) 1st (3 times, most recent in 2004)

World Baseball Classic
- Appearances: 6 (first in 2006)
- Best result: (silver) 2nd (1 time, in 2006)

World Cup
- Appearances: 35 (first in 1939)
- Best result: (gold) 1st (25 times, most recent in 2005)

Intercontinental Cup
- Appearances: 13 (first in 1979)
- Best result: (gold) 1st (10 times, most recent in 2006)

Pan American Games
- Appearances: 16 (first in 1951)
- Best result: (gold) 1st (12 times, most recent in 2007)

The Cuba national baseball team (Spanish: Selección de béisbol de Cuba) also known as "Team Asere", represents Cuba in baseball at regional and international levels. The team is generally made up of players from the domestic Cuban national baseball system, though it has at times included players who defected to the United States. Cuba was described in 2009 as a baseball powerhouse and currently ranks 12th in World Baseball Softball Confederation's world rankings.

For much of the 20th century, Cuba dominated tournaments such as the Baseball World Cup (originally, the Amateur World Series), where it won 25 titles (22 more than the next-closest nation) between 1939 and 2005. Its success stemmed, in part, from the nominally amateur status of its domestic league, as professional players from other leagues were largely excluded from international competition. During this period, it enjoyed similar dominance at the Pan American Games and the Central American and Caribbean Games.

Cuba has been the most successful national team at the Olympics, medaling in five of the six Olympics in which baseball was played, with three gold medals and two silver medals. It has the distinction of being one of two nations, along with Japan, to compete in the first five baseball contests at the Summer Olympic Games.

The Cuba national baseball have competed in the 2026 World Baseball Classic in March 2026, but were met with a shocking exit on Pool A, losing to both hosts Puerto Rico and surprising upstart Canada despite winning against Panama and Colombia, with Cuba having been eliminated for the very first time in a World Baseball Classic tournament.

== History ==
=== World Baseball Classic era ===
Cuba competed in the inaugural 2006 World Baseball Classic (WBC) tournament, despite the controversy of Cuban involvement and the United States embargo against Cuba. In the final, Cuba lost the gold medal to Japan, 10–6.

Cuba was originally slated to host the 2009 Baseball World Cup, but the matches were moved to Europe.

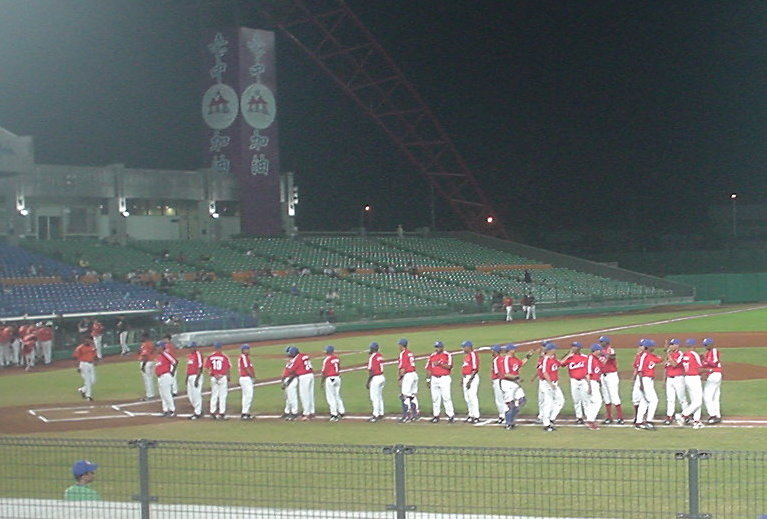
Cuban team lining up prior to the gold medal game in the 2006 Intercontinental Cup against the Netherlands

The 2009 WBC was the second time Cuba competed at the 2009 WBC Pool B stage, at Foro Sol in Mexico City. Cuba continued to advance to the second round with wins over South Africa and Australia. Cuba lost to Japan twice in the 2nd round, and were eliminated.

They last were eliminated before the start of the final stage of any international tournament in 1951.

At the 2013 WBC, Cuba competed in Pool A at the Fukuoka Dome in Fukuoka, Japan. Cuba advanced in the tournament against: China, Japan, and newcomers Brazil. Cuba moved on to the second round in Pool 1 to defeat the Netherlands, losing 6–2. Cuba defeated Chinese Taipei, 14–0. They played a face off game with previous competitors, the Netherlands, and lost 7–6. Just as in 2009, Cuba was eliminated in the path to competing in the finals.

At the 2017 World Baseball Classic, Cuban hitters Frederich Cepeda and Alfredo Despaigne had the distinction in WBC history to be the only players that each hit six home runs in their careers in the WBC.

The team had a 2–1 record in the first round. It was led by slugger Despaigne, who took over as the all-time WBC home-run leader.

Cuba advanced into the second round, where it lost its first game to undefeated Pool A winner Team Israel. Former Major League starting pitcher Jason Marquis (in 5.2 innings) and three Team Israel relief pitchers (including Brad Goldberg and Josh Zeid, who both threw 96 mph fastballs) kept Cuba to five hits and one run, a homer by Despaigne, who became the all-time World Baseball Classic home run leader. Pool A MVP catcher Ryan Lavarnway had two hits for Israel. Cuba went on to lose all 3 games they played and failed to advance to the championship round.

The team tried but failed to qualify for the 2020 Olympics at the eight-team Americas Qualifying Event on May 31 through June 5, 2021. On June 1, 2021, Cuba was eliminated from the qualifiers, marking their first failure to qualify for the Olympic Games.

== Current squad ==
Cuba roster – 2023 World Baseball Classic
Players		Coaches
Pitchers: 22 Frank Álvarez; 34 Emmanuel Chapman; 30 Josimar Cousin; 6 Armando Duenas; 25 Denny Larrondo; 35 Yoan López; 92 Raidel Martínez; 90 Randy Martinez; 62 Darien Núñez; 38 Julio Robaina; 15 Osiel Rodriguez; 29 Yariel Rodríguez; 16 Luis Romero; 18 Pedro Santos	Catchers: 3 Omar Hernandez; 17 Andrys Pérez; Infielders: 71 Erisbel Arruebarrena; 24 Yiddi Cappe; 10 Yoán Moncada; 9 Malcom Nuñez; 2 Alexei Ramirez; 95 Christian Rodriguez; 13 Alexander Vargas; 33 Yoel Yanqui; Outfielders: 54 Alfredo Despaigne; 7 Yoelkis Guibert; 40 Ariel Martinez; 20 Leonel Moas Jr.; 1 Roel Santos	Manager: 11 Germán Mesa; Coaches: 39 Noelvis Gonzalez (bench); 19 Jesus Bosmenier (pitching); 99 Pedro Luis Lazo (pitching); 50 Omar Linares (hitting); 51 Cecilio Drake (first base); 49 Rafael Munoz (third base); 37 Humberto Guevara; 48 Yulieski González (batting practice); Roster

== Results and fixtures ==
The following is a list of professional baseball match results currently active in the latest version of the WBSC World Rankings, as well as any future matches that have been scheduled.

Legend

Win Lose Void or postponed Fixture

=== 2019 ===
Pan American Games GS	July 29	Cuba	1–6	Colombia	Campo de Béisbol, Peru
Pan American Games GS	10:00 PET		Boxscore		Attendance: 2,456

Pan American Games GS	July 30	Canada	8–6	Cuba	Campo de Béisbol, Peru
Pan American Games GS	19:00 PET		Boxscore		Attendance: 1,123

Pan American Games GS	July 31	Cuba	10–0 (F/7)	Argentina	Campo de Béisbol, Peru
Pan American Games GS	15:00 PET		Boxscore		Attendance: 987

Pan American Games 5th	August 3	Dominican Republic	10–9 (F/10)	Cuba	Campo de Béisbol, Peru
Pan American Games 5th	15:00 PET		Boxscore		Attendance: 2,415

WBSC Premier12 GS	November 6	Canada	3–0	Cuba	Gocheok Dome, South Korea
WBSC Premier12 GS	12:00 KST		Boxscore		Attendance: 250

WBSC Premier12 GS	November 7	Australia	2–3	Cuba	Gocheok Dome, South Korea
WBSC Premier12 GS	12:00 KST		Boxscore		Attendance: 252

WBSC Premier12 GS	November 8	Cuba	0–7	South Korea	Gocheok Dome, South Korea
WBSC Premier12 GS	19:00 KST		Boxscore		Attendance: 13,600

=== 2021 ===
Caribbean Cup GS	June 26	Cuba	14–7	Curaçao	Daou Ballpark, Curaçao
Caribbean Cup GS	20:00 AST		Boxscore

Caribbean Cup GS	June 27	Cuba	9–1	Peru	Daou Ballpark, Curaçao
Caribbean Cup GS	15:00 AST		Boxscore

Caribbean Cup GS	June 28	U.S. Virgin Islands	Void	Cuba	Daou Ballpark, Curaçao
Caribbean Cup GS	15:00 AST		Boxscore

Caribbean Cup GS	June 30	Curaçao	0–7	Cuba	Daou Ballpark, Curaçao
Caribbean Cup GS	20:00 AST		Boxscore

Caribbean Cup GS	July 1	Cuba	Void	U.S. Virgin Islands	Daou Ballpark, Curaçao
Caribbean Cup GS	15:00 AST		Boxscore

Caribbean Cup GS	July 2	Peru	0–13	Cuba	Daou Ballpark, Curaçao
Caribbean Cup GS	15:00 AST		Boxscore

Caribbean Cup F	July 3	Curaçao	4–3	Cuba	Daou Ballpark, Curaçao
Caribbean Cup F	20:00 AST		Boxscore

=== 2022 ===
Haarlem Week GS	July 9	Netherlands	5–1	Cuba	Mulier Stadium, Netherlands
Haarlem Week GS	19:30 CET		Boxscore

Haarlem Week GS	July 10	Cuba	3–4	Japan	Mulier Stadium, Netherlands
Haarlem Week GS	19:30 CET		Boxscore

Haarlem Week GS	July 11	Cuba	0–2	United States	Mulier Stadium, Netherlands
Haarlem Week GS	19:30 CET		Boxscore

Haarlem Week GS	July 12	Curaçao	1–0	Cuba	Mulier Stadium, Netherlands
Haarlem Week GS	15:30 CET		Boxscore

Haarlem Week GS	July 13	Italy	2–0	Cuba	Mulier Stadium, Netherlands
Haarlem Week GS	12:00 CET		Boxscore

Haarlem Week 5th	July 14	Cuba	5–1	Italy	Mulier Stadium, Netherlands
Haarlem Week 5th	12:00 CET		Boxscore

Caribbean Cup GS	December 5	Cuba	9–0	U.S. Virgin Islands	Rodgers Stadium, Bahamas
Caribbean Cup GS	15:00 ET		Boxscore

Caribbean Cup GS	December 6	Puerto Rico	6–0	Cuba	Rodgers Stadium, Bahamas
Caribbean Cup GS	19:00 ET		Boxscore

Caribbean Cup GS	December 7	Bahamas	3–9	Cuba	Rodgers Stadium, Bahamas
Caribbean Cup GS	19:00 ET		Boxscore

Caribbean Cup GS	December 8	Cuba	8–7	Curaçao	Rodgers Stadium, Bahamas
Caribbean Cup GS	15:00 ET		Boxscore

Caribbean Cup SF	December 10	Curaçao	2–4	Cuba	Rodgers Stadium, Bahamas
Caribbean Cup SF	14:00 ET		Boxscore

Caribbean Cup F	December 11	Cuba	4–9	Puerto Rico	Rodgers Stadium, Bahamas
Caribbean Cup F	17:00 ET		Boxscore

=== 2023 ===
World Baseball Classic GS	March 8	Cuba	2–4	Netherlands	Taichung Stadium, Taiwan
World Baseball Classic GS	12:00 NST	LP: Onelki García (0–1)	Boxscore	WP: Eric Méndez (1–0); Sv: Wendell Floranus (1)	Attendance: 6,501; Umpires: HP – Nic Lentz, 1B – Shoji Arisumi, 2B – Dan Iassogna, 3B – Serge Makouchetev

World Baseball Classic GS	March 9	Italy	6–3 (F/10)	Cuba	Taichung Stadium, Taiwan
World Baseball Classic GS	19:00 NST	WP: Matthew Festa (1–0)	Boxscore	LP: Raidel Martínez (0–1)	Attendance: 6,217; Umpires: HP: Ki Talk Park, 1B: Mark Carlson, 2B: Chris Segal, 3B: Serge Makouchetcher

World Baseball Classic GS	March 10	Cuba	13–4	Panama	Taichung Stadium, Taiwan
World Baseball Classic GS	12:00 NST	WP: Miguel Romero (1–0)	Boxscore	LP: Matt Hardy (0–1); HR: Rubén Tejada (1)	Attendance: 7,023; Umpires: HP - Dan Iassogna, 1B - Serge Makouchetev, 2B - Mark Carlson, 3B - Trent Thomas

World Baseball Classic GS	March 12	Chinese Taipei	1–7	Cuba	Taichung Stadium, Taiwan
World Baseball Classic GS	12:00 NST	LP: Shih-Peng Chen (0–1)	Boxscore	WP: Elian Leyva (1–0); HR: Erisbel Arruebarrena (1), Yoán Moncada (1)	Attendance: 18,852; Umpires: HP – Nic Lentz, 1B – Ki Talk Park, 2B – Larry Vanover, 3B – Shoji Arisumi

World Baseball Classic QF	March 15	Australia	3–4	Cuba	Tokyo Dome, Japan
World Baseball Classic QF	19:00 NST	LP: Josh Guyer (0–1); HR: Rixon Wingrove (1)	Boxscore	WP: Miguel Romero (2–0); Sv: Raidel Martínez (1)	Attendance: 35,061; Umpires: HP – Adam Hamari, 1B – Cuti Suárez, 2B – Laz Díaz, 3B – Delfin Colon

World Baseball Classic SF	March 19	Cuba	2–14	United States	loanDepot Park, United States
World Baseball Classic SF	19:00 ET	LP: Roenis Elías	Boxscore	WP: Adam Wainwright; HR: Paul Goldschmidt (1), Trea Turner (3), Trea Turner (4), Cedric Mullins (1)	Attendance: 35,779; Umpires: HP – John Tumpane, 1B – Quinn Wolcott, 2B – Lance Barksdale, 3B – Jong Chui Park, LF – Ramiro Alfaro, RF – Edward Pinales

=== 2026 ===
World Baseball Classic GS	March 6	Cuba	3-1	Panama	Hiram Bithorn Stadium in San Juan, Puerto Rico
World Baseball Classic GS	12:00 AST	WP: Liván Moinelo (1–0); Sv: Raidel Martínez (1); HR: Yoelquis Guibert (1), Yoán Moncada (1)	Boxscore	LP: Logan Allen (0–1)	Attendance: 10,015; Umpires: HP – Tomoya Ishiyama, 1B – Tripp Gibson, 2B – Nestor Ceja, 3B – Chang Chan-jung

World Baseball Classic GS	March 8	Colombia	4-7	Cuba	Hiram Bithorn Stadium in San Juan, Puerto Rico
World Baseball Classic GS	12:00 AST	LP: Luis Patiño (0–1)	Boxscore	WP: Denny Larrondo (1–0); HR: Ariel Martínez (1), Erisbel Arruebarrena (1)	Attendance: 10,957; Umpires: HP – Tripp Gibson, 1B – Laz Diaz, 2B – Chang Chan-jung, 3B – Mario Villavicencio

World Baseball Classic GS	March 9	Cuba	1-4	Puerto Rico	Hiram Bithorn Stadium in San Juan, Puerto Rico
World Baseball Classic GS	19:00 AST	LP: Julio Robaina (0–1)	Boxscore	WP: Elmer Rodríguez (1–0); Sv: Edwin Díaz (1)	Attendance: 19,819; Umpires: HP – Vic Carapazza, 1B – Domingo Paulino, 2B – Tripp Gibson, 3B – Tomoya Ishiyama

World Baseball Classic GS	March 11	Canada	7-2	Cuba	Hiram Bithorn Stadium in San Juan, Puerto Rico
World Baseball Classic GS	15:00 AST	WP: Cal Quantrill (1-0); HR: Abraham Toro	Boxscore	LP: Liván Moinelo (1-1)	Attendance: 10,610; Umpires: HP – Tripp Gibson, 1B – Chan-Jung Chang, 2B – Tomoya Ishiyama, 3B – Nestor Ceja

== International tournament results ==
=== World Baseball Classic ===
World Baseball Classic record							Qualification record			
Year	Round	Position	W	L	RS	RA	W	L	RS	RA
(Puerto Rico) (United States) 2006	Runners-up	2nd	5	3	44	43	No qualifiers held			
(Mexico) (United States) 2009	Quarterfinals	6th	4	2	36	24	No qualifiers held			
(Japan) 2013	Quarterfinals	5th	4	2	45	18	Automatically qualified			
(Japan) 2017	Quarterfinals	7th	2	4	23	40	Automatically qualified			
(Taiwan) (Japan) (United States) 2023	Semifinals	4th	3	3	31	32	Automatically qualified			
(Puerto Rico) 2026	Pool Stage	10th	2	2	13	16	Automatically qualified			
Total	Runners-up	6/6	18	14	179	157	—	—	—	—

=== Olympics ===
Summer Olympics record								Qualification record
Year	Round	Position	W	L	%	RS	RA	Method
(Spain) 1992	Gold medal	1st	9	0	1.000	95	16	1991 Pan American Games
(United States) 1996	Gold medal	1st	9	0	1.000	118	59	1995 Pan American Games
(Australia) 2000	Silver medal	2nd	7	2	.778	53	21	1999 Pan American Games
(Greece) 2004	Gold medal	1st	8	1	.889	55	27	Americas Qualifying Tournament
(China) 2008	Silver medal	2nd	7	2	.778	64	28	Americas Qualifying Tournament
(Japan) 2020	Did not qualify							Americas Qualifying Event
(United States) 2028	Did not qualify							2026 World Baseball Classic
Total	3 Titles	5/6	40	5	.889	385	151	

=== Baseball World Cup ===
- Gold: 1939, 1940, 1942, 1943, 1950, 1952, 1953, 1961, 1969, 1970, 1971, 1972, 1973, 1976, 1978, 1980, 1984, 1986, 1988, 1990, 1994, 1998, 2001, 2003, 2005
- Silver: 1941, 2007, 2009, 2011
- Bronze: 1944, 1951

=== Intercontinental Cup ===
- Gold: 1979, 1983, 1985, 1987, 1989, 1991, 1993, 1995, 2002, 2006
- Silver: 1981, 1997, 1999

=== Pan American Games ===
- Gold: 1951, 1963, 1971, 1975, 1979, 1983, 1987, 1991, 1995, 1999, 2003, 2007
- Silver: 1967
- Bronze: 2011, 2015

=== Central American & Caribbean Games ===
- Gold: 1926, 1930, 1935, 1938, 1950, 1966, 1970, 1974, 1978, 1986, 1990, 1993, 1998, 2006, 2014
- Silver: 1982, 2018
- Bronze: 1946

=== Minor tournaments ===
- Pan American Championship
  - Champions: 1985, 2002, 2003, 2004
- Latin American Series
  - Champions: 1952

== See also ==
- 1999 Baltimore Orioles–Cuba national baseball team exhibition series
- Cuban National Series
