= Ormond Sampson =

Bahamian-American baseball player (1910–1966)

- Shortstop
- Born: March 3, 1910; San Salvador Island, The Bahamas
- Died: July 2, 1966 (aged 56); Miami, Florida, U.S.
- Batted: Right Threw: Right

Negro league baseball debut
- 1932, for the Atlanta Black Crackers

Last appearance
- 1938, for the Chicago American Giants

Negro leagues statistics
- Batting average: .229
- Home runs: 0
- Runs batted in: 10

Teams
- Atlanta Black Crackers (1932); Chicago American Giants (1938)

Ormond Garfield Sampson (March 3, 1910 – July 2, 1966) was a Bahamian-American professional baseball shortstop who played in the Negro leagues between 1932 and 1941. He was the first Bahamian-born player to play in a recognized major league.

A native of San Salvador Island, Bahamas, Sampson made his Negro leagues debut in 1932 with the Atlanta Black Crackers. He went on to play for the Chicago American Giants in 1938. He died in Miami, Florida in 1966 at age 56.
