= Caribbean Baseball Cup =

International baseball tournament

The Caribbean Baseball Cup (Spanish: Copa del Caribe; Papiamento: Kopa Karibe) is a baseball tournament organized by Caribbean Baseball Confederation (COCABE), which is itself a division of WBSC Americas. It serves as a qualifier for higher-level tournaments, such as the Central American and Caribbean Games.

The tournament has served as a testing ground for smaller federations such as the Bahamas and Curaçao, whose players often represent larger national teams such as Great Britain and the Netherlands, respectively. Although not a Caribbean nation, Peru has participated in the tournament three times, winning a silver medal in 2019 and a bronze medal in 2021.

== Results ==
Year	Host	Champions	Runners-up	3rd place
2018; Details	(Dominican Republic); Santo Domingo	Dominican Republic	Curaçao	U.S. Virgin Islands
2019; Details	(Dominican Republic); Santo Domingo	Dominican Republic	Peru	U.S. Virgin Islands
2021; Details	(Curaçao); Willemstad	Curaçao	Cuba	Peru
2022; Details	(The Bahamas); Nassau	Puerto Rico	Cuba	Curaçao
2023; Details	(Puerto Rico); Las Piedras and Fajardo	Cuba	Curaçao	Puerto Rico
2024; Details	(The Bahamas); Nassau	Curaçao	U.S. Virgin Islands	Cuba
2025; Details	(The Bahamas); Nassau	Curaçao	Bahamas	U.S. Virgin Islands
2026; Details	(Dominican Republic); Puerto Plata			

== Medal table ==
Rank	Nation	Gold	Silver	Bronze	Total
1	Curaçao	3	2	1	6
2	Dominican Republic	2	0	0	2
3	Cuba	1	2	1	4
4	Puerto Rico	1	0	1	2
5	U.S. Virgin Islands	0	1	3	4
6	Peru	0	1	1	2
7	Bahamas	0	1	0	1
Totals (7 entries)		7	7	7	21

== Participating teams ==
Teams	(Dominican Republic) 2018	(Dominican Republic) 2019	(Curaçao) 2021	(The Bahamas) 2022	(Puerto Rico) 2023	(The Bahamas) 2024	(The Bahamas) 2025	(Dominican Republic) 2026	Years
Aruba	4th	5th							2
Bahamas				4th		6th	2nd		3
Cuba			2nd	2nd	1st	3rd			4
Curaçao	2nd		1st	3rd	3rd	1st	1st		6
Dominican Republic	1st	1st				5th	5th		4
Haiti	6th	6th							2
Jamaica		7th							1
Peru	5th	2nd	3rd						3
Puerto Rico				1st	3rd				2
Sint Maarten						4th	4th		2
Venezuela		4th							1
U.S. Virgin Islands	3rd	3rd	4th	5th	4th	2nd	3rd		7
Total	6	7	4	5	4	6	5		

== See also ==
- Baseball awards § Americas
- Baseball at the Central American and Caribbean Games
- Baseball at the Pan American Games
- Baseball at the South American Games
- Copa América (baseball)
