= Curaçao national baseball team =

Information
- Country: Curaçao
- Federation: FEBEKO
- Confederation: WBSC Americas
- Manager: Hainley Statia

WBSC ranking
- Current: 29 (26 March 2026)

World Cup
- Appearances: 12 (Note: As the Netherlands Antilles) (first in 1952)
- Best result: 7th (1973)

The Curaçao national baseball team represents the nation of Curaçao in international competition. It is distinct from the Netherlands national baseball team, though Curaçaoan players are eligible to represent the Netherlands in competitions like the World Baseball Classic. Curaçao has participated independently in minor tournaments such as the Caribbean Baseball Cup and Haarlem Baseball Week (where it competed against the Netherlands in 2022)

Curaçao was previously represented as part of the Netherlands Antilles national baseball team in senior-level men's international competition,. The Netherlands Antilles were a constituent country of the Kingdom of the Netherlands until the country, and its baseball federation, was dissolved in 2011.

In 2024, the baseball federations of Curaçao and Aruba announced a partnership to field their own national team, in what some commentators viewed as a split with the Netherlands.

== Netherlands Antilles national baseball team ==
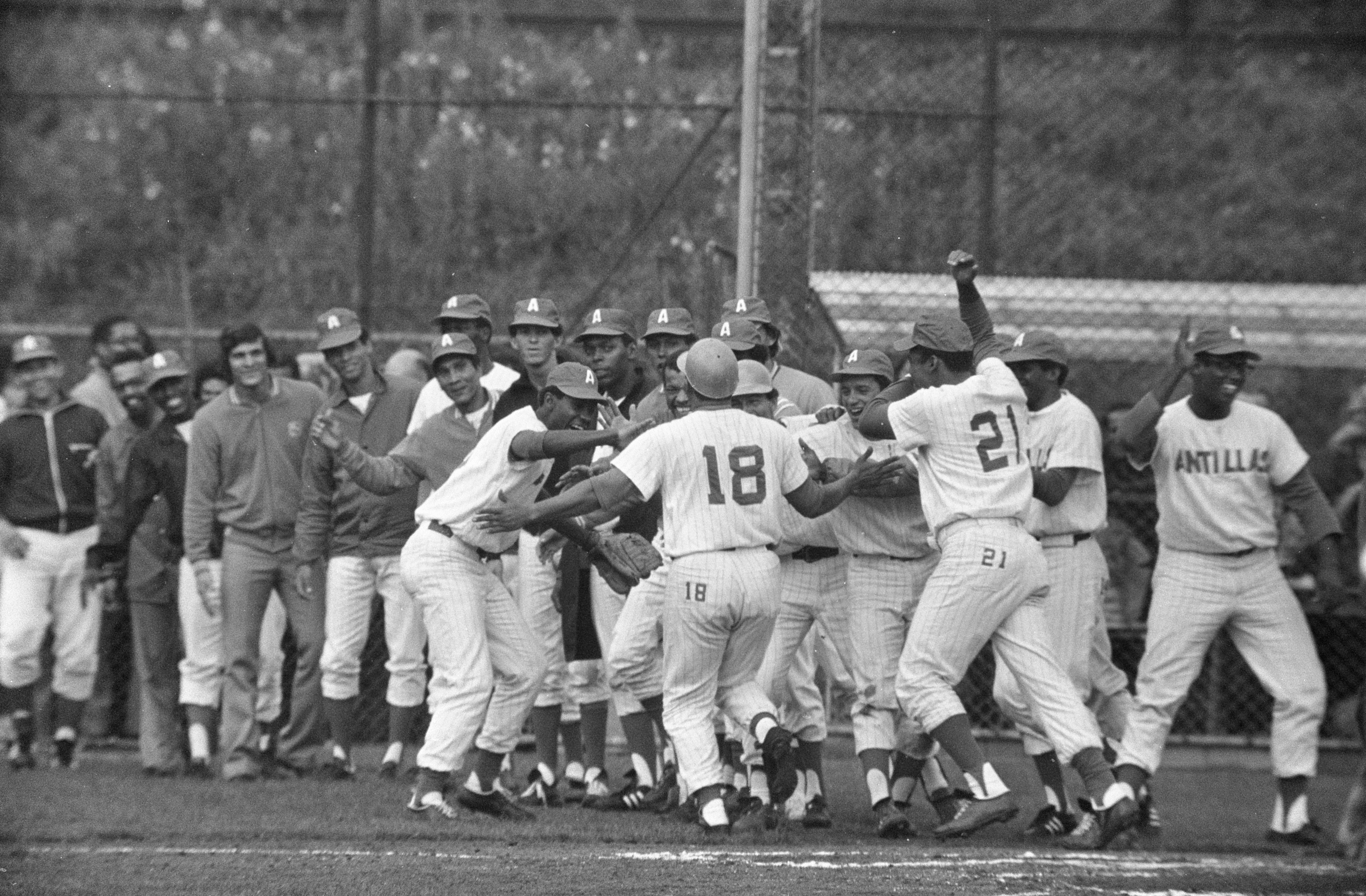
Members of the Netherlands Antilles team at the 1972 Haarlem Baseball Week

The Netherlands Antilles team was controlled by the Netherlands Antillean Baseball Federation. Like the Curaçao national team, it was distinct from the Netherlands national baseball team, though for certain tournaments (namely the World Baseball Classic), Dutch Antillean players were eligible to represent the Netherlands. In other tournaments, such as the 1988 Baseball World Cup, both the Netherlands and the Netherlands Antilles competed.

The Dutch Antillean national team was largely composed of players from Curaçao and Aruba, until the latter split off in 1986 to form its own constituent country of the Kingdom of the Netherlands. The Aruba national baseball team would compete against the Netherlands Antilles at the 1991 Pan American Games.

The Netherlands Antilles were represented in twelve Baseball World Cups, making their first appearance at the 1952 Amateur World Series. The team's highest finish was 7th place, at the 1973 Amateur World Series in Cuba.

The Netherlands Antilles was dissolved as a unified political entity on 10 October 2010. Since then, players from the former Dutch Antilles have continued to play on the Netherlands national team for the World Baseball Classic. For minor international competitions, Curaçao has fielded its own national team, as have Bonaire and Sint Maarten.

== Roster ==
Curaçao's roster for the 2026 Central American and Caribbean Games, the last official competition in which the team took part.

Curaçao national baseball team – 2026 Central American and Caribbean Games roster
| Players | | Coaches |
| Pitchers: 25 Nelmerson Angela; 40 Dennis Burgersdijk; 8 Franklin van Gurp; 41 Misja Harcksen; 32 Sedley Karel; 26 Finn Kragt; 19 Jordan Lucas; 28 Ruderly Manuel; 37 Arlison Rodriguez; 17 Martijn Schoonderwoerd; 33 Cerilio Soleana; 29 Pim Vijfvinkel | Catchers: 12 Phildrick Llewellyn; 14 Stephan Vidal; Infielders: 42 Sherten Apostel; 11 Ray van Gurp; 21 Dudley Leonora; 23 Stijn van der Meer; 6 Riordan Windster; Outfielders: 13 Christian Diaz; 10 Shean Michael; 9 Tommy van den Sanden; 3 Jeandro Tromp | Manager: 16 Hainley Statia; Coaches: 18 Ghionelo Jansen (third base); 5 Gustavo De Jongh (pitching); 24 Carlos Pineda; Roster |

== Competitive record ==
=== Netherlands Antilles ===
==== Baseball World Cup ====
Amateur World Series & Baseball World Cup record
| Year | Result | Position | Pld | W | L | % | RS | RA | Org. |
|---|---|---|---|---|---|---|---|---|---|
| (United Kingdom) 1938 | Did not enter | | | | | | | | IBF |
| (Cuba) 1939 | Did not enter | | | | | | | | IBF |
| (Cuba) 1940 | Did not enter | | | | | | | | IBF |
| (Cuba) 1941 | Did not enter | | | | | | | | IBF |
| (Cuba) 1942 | Did not enter | | | | | | | | IBF |
| (Cuba) 1943 | Did not enter | | | | | | | | IBF |
| (Venezuela) 1944 | Did not enter | | | | | | | | FIBA |
| (Venezuela) 1945 | Did not enter | | | | | | | | FIBA |
| (Colombia) 1947 | Did not enter | | | | | | | | FIBA |
| (Nicaragua) 1948 | Did not enter | | | | | | | | FIBA |
| (Nicaragua) 1950 | Did not enter | | | | | | | | FIBA |
| (Mexico) 1951 | Did not enter | | | | | | | | FIBA |
| (Cuba) 1952 | Single-table tournament | 9th | 6 | 2 | 4 | .333 | | | FIBA |
| (Venezuela) 1953 | Single-table tournament | 9th | 10 | 2 | 8 | .200 | | | FIBA |
| (Costa Rica) 1961 | Single-table tournament | 8th | 4 | 1 | 3 | .250 | | | FIBA |
| (Colombia) 1965 | Single-table tournament | 8th | 8 | 2 | 6 | .250 | | | FIBA |
| (Dominican Republic) 1969 | Single-table tournament | 10th | 9 | 1 | 8 | .111 | | | FIBA |
| (Colombia) 1970 | Single-table tournament | 8th | 11 | 3 | 8 | .273 | | | FIBA |
| (Cuba) 1971 | Single-table tournament | 10th | 9 | 0 | 9 | .000 | | | FIBA |
| (Nicaragua) 1972 | Did not enter | | | | | | | | FIBA |
| (Cuba) 1973 | Single-table tournament | 7th | 14 | 3 | 11 | .214 | | | FIBA |
| (Nicaragua) 1973 | Did not enter | | | | | | | | FEMBA |
| (United States) 1974 | Did not enter | | | | | | | | FEMBA |
| (Colombia) 1976 | Did not enter | | | | | | | | AINBA |
| (Italy) 1978 | Did not enter | | | | | | | | AINBA |
| (Japan) 1980 | Did not enter | | | | | | | | AINBA |
| (South Korea) 1982 | Did not enter | | | | | | | | IBAF |
| (Cuba) 1984 | Single-table tournament | 10th | 10 | 4 | 6 | .400 | | | IBAF |
| (Netherlands) 1986 | Single-table tournament | 11th | 11 | 2 | 9 | .182 | | | IBAF |
| (Italy) 1988 | Group stage | 11th | 11 | 1 | 10 | .091 | 44 | 115 | IBAF |
| (Canada) 1990 | Did not qualify | | | | | | | | IBAF |
| (Nicaragua) 1994 | Did not qualify | | | | | | | | IBAF |
| (Italy) 1998 | Did not qualify | | | | | | | | IBAF |
| (Taiwan) 2001 | Did not qualify | | | | | | | | IBAF |
| (Cuba) 2003 | Did not qualify | | | | | | | | IBAF |
| (Netherlands) 2005 | Did not qualify | | | | | | | | IBAF |
| (Taiwan) 2007 | Did not qualify | | | | | | | | IBAF |
| (Italy) 2009 | Second round | 16th | 10 | 2 | 8 | .200 | 46 | 115 | IBAF |
| (Panama) 2011 | Did not qualify | | | | | | | | IBAF |
| Total | 0 Titles | 12/38 | 113 | 23 | 90 | .200 | — | — | |

=== Curaçao ===
==== Caribbean Baseball Cup ====
- 2018 : (silver) 2nd
- 2021 : (gold) 1st
- 2022 : (bronze) 3rd
- 2023 : (silver) 2nd
- 2024 : (gold) 1st
- 2025 : (gold) 1st

==== Haarlem Baseball Week ====
- 2016 : 5th
- 2022 : (silver) 2nd

==== World Port Tournament ====
- 1991 : 4th
- 2011 : 4th
- 2013 : (bronze) 3rd
- 2015 : (bronze) 3rd
- 2017 : (bronze) 3rd

== See also ==
- Baseball in the Netherlands

== Bibliography ==
- Bjarkman, Peter C. (2005). Diamonds Around the Globe: The Encyclopedia of International Baseball. Westport, CT United States: Greenwood Press. ISBN 0-313-32268-6. OCLC 58806121.
