= Bahamas national baseball team =

Information
- Country: Bahamas
- Federation: Bahamas Baseball Association
- Confederation: COPABE

WBSC ranking
- Current: 40 ▲3 (26 March 2026)

The Bahamas national baseball team represents the Bahamas in international baseball competitions. The team is administered by the Bahamas Baseball Association (BBA).

The team played in the 2009 World Baseball Challenge, but went 0-6. They were managed by Jeffrey Francis.

The Bahamas have participated in three editions of the Caribbean Baseball Cup, hosting all three tournaments. Their best finish came in 2022, when the team placed fourth.

== Roster ==
Bahamas' roster for the 2025 Caribbean Baseball Cup, the last official competition in which the team took part.

Bahamas national baseball team – 2025 Caribbean Baseball Cup roster
Players		Coaches
Pitchers: 25 Mateo Ferguson; 27 Chavez Fernander; 9 DeShaughn Forbes; 20 Chad McKenzie; 12 Cavian Roberts; 18 Tyreek Sherman; 19 Shameko Smith; 21 Orxavier Thomas; 22 Tahnaj Thomas; 6 Giovante Tomlins	Catchers: 10 Benjamin Dupuch; 3 Theodore Sweeting Jr.; 4 Caden Walker; Infielders: 23 Daalen Adderley; 29 Jaiden Cartwright; 28 Ellison Hanna II; 2 Cherif Neymour; 24 Daunte Stuart; Outfielders: 7 Pheron Charlton; 14 Zachary Gibson; 17 D'Shawn Knowles; 26 Byron Murray; 1 Toby Simmons; 11 Chavez Young	Manager: Michael Butler; Coaches: Kenneth Adderley; Nathaniel Butler; Javier Bowe; Ray Stubbs

== International tournament results ==
=== Caribbean Baseball Cup ===
Caribbean Baseball Cup record
Year	Round	Position	W	L	RS	RA
(Dominican Republic) 2018	Did not participate					
(Dominican Republic) 2019	Did not participate					
(Curaçao) 2021	Did not participate					
(The Bahamas) 2022	Semifinals	4th	1	5	24	51
(Puerto Rico) 2023	Did not participate					
(The Bahamas) 2024	Opening round	6th	1	4	7	29
(The Bahamas) 2025	Preliminary round	7th	1	6	24	49
Total	3/7	–	3	15	55	129
