= U.S. Virgin Islands national baseball team =

United States Virgin Islands national baseball team

Information
- Country: United States Virgin Islands
- Federation: US Virgin Islands Baseball Federation
- Confederation: WBSC Americas
- Manager: Rafael Jackson

WBSC ranking
- Current: 41 (26 October 2026)

The United States Virgin Islands National Baseball Team is the national baseball team of the United States Virgin Islands. The team represents the United States Virgin Islands in international competitions. The team participated in the 2010 XXI Central American and Caribbean Games held in Mayaguez, Puerto Rico, July 18 – August 2, 2010. It was the first appearance for a USVI team at the CAC Games since 1998. In the first of USVI's four CAC Games, VI lost a 1–0 decision to Panama. The only score was made in the bottom of the sixth inning when Jaime Jaen hit a double, and went to third on a sacrifice bunt by Earl Agnoly. With Jaen on third, Carlos Muñoz hit a single, which brought Jaen home to score the run. The USVI's Geronimo Newton pitched a complete game, scattering eight hits and walking one.

In the second game, against Guatemala, Guatemala rallied from a 5–2 deficit to tie the game in the bottom of the ninth, and won the game 7–6 in the eleventh inning. Venezuela handed the VI its worst defeat, 11–0. By comparison, Venezuela beat Guatemala 20–0 in a mercy rule "knock-out" shortened 6½ innings. Venezuela defeated Panama 3–2.

Puerto Rico defeated the USVI squad 6–0. Puerto Rico defeated Guatemala 9-0 in a rain-shortened 6½ innings. Puerto Rico defeated Venezuela 3-2.
