= Cuba at the World Baseball Classic =

International baseball delegation

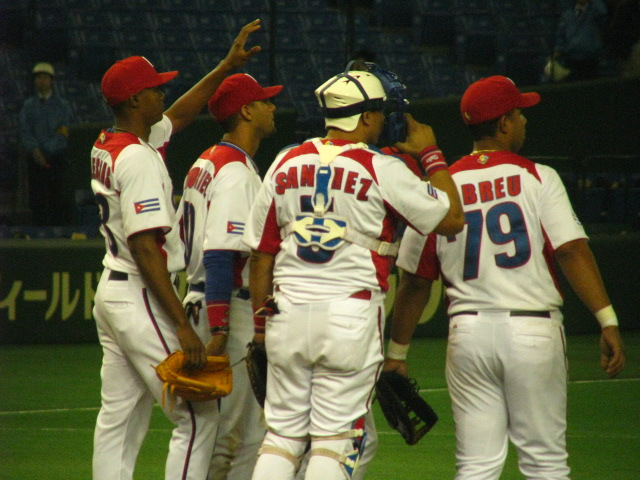
The Cuban national team during the 2013 World Baseball Classic

The Cuba national baseball team has participated in all six editions of the World Baseball Classic (WBC), the premier international baseball tournament, which determines the sport's world champion.

Despite previous success at the Summer Olympics and the Baseball World Cup, Cuba has never won the World Baseball Classic. The team debuted in the 2006 tournament, where they were runners-up, losing the championship game to Japan. Cuba reached the second round in 2009, 2013 and 2017. In 2023, the team advanced to the semifinals, where it was defeated by the United States. In 2026, the team finished third in its pool and was eliminated in the first round, marking the first time the Cuban team failed to advance beyond the opening round.

Seven Cuban players have been included in the All-World Baseball Classic Team: Yoandy Garlobo, Yuli Gurriel and Yadel Martí in 2006; Frederich Cepeda and Yoenis Céspedes in 2009; and Yoán Moncada and Miguel Romero in 2023.

Five managers have led the Cuban team in the WBC: Higinio Vélez in 2006 and 2009, Víctor Mesa in 2013, Carlos Martí in 2017, Armando Johnson in 2023, and Germán Mesa in 2026.

== Record ==
World Baseball Classic record							Qualification record			
Year	Round	Position	W	L	RS	RA	W	L	RS	RA
(Puerto Rico) (United States) 2006	Runners-up	2nd	5	3	44	43	No qualifiers held			
(Mexico) (United States) 2009	Second round	6th	4	2	36	24	No qualifiers held			
(Japan) 2013	Second round	5th	4	2	45	18	Automatically qualified			
(Japan) 2017	Second round	7th	2	4	23	40	Automatically qualified			
(Taiwan) (Japan) (United States) 2023	Semifinals	4th	3	3	31	32	Automatically qualified			
(Puerto Rico) 2026	Pool stage	10th	2	2	13	16	Automatically qualified			
Total	–	6/6	20	16	192	173	—	—	—	—

== Results ==
Win Lose

=== 2006 World Baseball Classic ===
Pool C	8 March	Cuba	8–6 (F/11)	Panama	Hiram Bithorn Stadium
Pool C	14:00 UTC–4	WP: Maya; Sv: Martí; HR: Gurriel	Boxscore	LP: Cortez; HR: Rivera	Attendance: 6,129

Pool C	9 March	Cuba	11–2	Netherlands	Hiram Bithorn Stadium
Pool C	20:00 UTC–4	WP: Romero; Sv: Martí; HR: Garlobo, Urrutia	Boxscore	LP: Markwell	Attendance: 7,657

Pool C	10 March	Puerto Rico	12–2 (F/7)	Cuba	Hiram Bithorn Stadium
Pool C	20:30 UTC–4	WP: González	Boxscore	LP: Borroto	Attendance: 19,736

Pool 2	12 March	Cuba	7–2	Venezuela	Hiram Bithorn Stadium
Pool 2	14:00 UTC–4	WP: Martí; Sv: Lazo; HR: Cepeda, Pestano	Boxscore	LP: Santana; HR: Chávez	Attendance: 13,697

Pool 2	13 March	Dominican Republic	7–3	Cuba	Hiram Bithorn Stadium
Pool 2	14:00 UTC–4	WP: Pérez; Sv: Rodney; HR: Ortiz	Boxscore	LP: Odelín; HR: Gurriel	Attendance: 6,594

Pool 2	15 March	Cuba	4–3	Puerto Rico	Hiram Bithorn Stadium
Pool 2	20:00 UTC–4	WP: Romero; Sv: Odelín	Boxscore	LP: González; HR: Williams	Attendance: 19,773

Semifinals	18 March	Cuba	3–1	Dominican Republic	Petco Park
Semifinals	12:00 UTC–8	WP: Lazo	Boxscore	LP: Pérez	Attendance: 41,268

Final	20 March	Japan	10–6	Cuba	Petco Park
Final	18:00 UTC–8	WP: Matsuzaka; Sv: Otsuka	Boxscore	LP: Romero; HR: Paret, Cepeda	Attendance: 42,696

=== 2009 World Baseball Classic ===
Pool B	8 March	South Africa	1–8	Cuba	Foro Sol
Pool B	20:00 UTC–6	LP: Armitage	Boxscore	WP: Vera; HR: Frederich Cepeda (2), Alfredo Despaigne, Héctor Olivera, Yuli Gurriel, Yoenis Céspedes	Attendance: 11,270

Pool B	10 March	Cuba	5–4	Australia	Foro Sol
Pool B	20:00 UTC–6	WP: Jiménez; HR: Céspedes (2), Peraza	Boxscore	LP: Thompson	Attendance: 13,396

Pool B	12 March	Mexico	4–16 (F/7)	Cuba	Foro Sol
Pool B	20:00 UTC–6	LP: Campos; HR: Sandoval, Robles, García	Boxscore	WP: González; HR: Gurriel, Pestano, Cepeda	Attendance: 20,149

Pool 1	15 March	Japan	6–0	Cuba	Petco Park
Pool 1	13:00 UTC–8	WP: Matsuzaka	Boxscore	LP: Chapman	Attendance: 20,179

Pool 1	16 March	Cuba	7–4	Mexico	Petco Park
Pool 1	20:00 UTC–8	WP: Vera; Sv: Lazo	Boxscore	LP: Campillo; HR: Cantú, Presichi	Attendance: 9,329

Pool 1	18 March	Japan	5–0	Cuba	Petco Park
Pool 1	20:00 UTC–8	WP: Iwakuma; Sv: Sugiuchi	Boxscore	LP: Maya	Attendance: 9,774

=== 2013 World Baseball Classic ===
Pool A	3 March	Cuba	5–2	Brazil	Fukuoka Dome
Pool A	12:30 UTC+9	WP: Jiménez; Sv: Iglesias	Boxscore	LP: Rienzo	Attendance: 4,003

Pool A	4 March	China	0–12 (F/7)	Cuba	Fukuoka Dome
Pool A	16:30 UTC+9	LP: Li	Boxscore	WP: Betancourt; HR: Bell, Abreu	Attendance: 3,123

Pool A	6 March	Cuba	6–3	Japan	Fukuoka Dome
Pool A	19:00 UTC+9	WP: Pérez; HR: Tomás, Despaigne	Boxscore	LP: Otonari	Attendance: 26,860

Pool 1	8 March	Netherlands	6–2	Cuba	Tokyo Dome
Pool 1	12:00 UTC+9	WP: Markwell; HR: Smith, Schoop	Boxscore	LP: Jiménez; HR: Despaigne, Gurriel	Attendance: 38,588

Pool 1	9 March	Chinese Taipei	0–14 (F/7)	Cuba	Tokyo Dome
Pool 1	19:00 UTC+9	LP: Lo	Boxscore	WP: Betancourt; HR: Cepeda, Tomás, Abreu, Despaigne	Attendance: 12,884

Pool 1	11 March	Cuba	6–7	Netherlands	Tokyo Dome
Pool 1	19:00 UTC+9	LP: Guevara; HR: Abreu	Boxscore	WP: van Mil; HR: Simmons	Attendance: 7,613

=== 2017 World Baseball Classic ===
Pool B	7 March	Cuba	6–11	Japan	Tokyo Dome
Pool B	19:00 UTC+9	LP: Yera; HR: Despaigne	Boxscore	WP: Ishikawa; HR: Matsuda, Tsutsugo	Attendance: 44,908

Pool B	8 March	China	0–6	Cuba	Tokyo Dome
Pool B	12:00 UTC+9	LP: Luo	Boxscore	WP: Baños	Attendance: 39,102

Pool B	10 March	Australia	3–4	Cuba	Tokyo Dome
Pool B	12:00 UTC+9	LP: Wells; HR: Oeltjen	Boxscore	WP: García; Sv: Lahera; HR: Despaigne	Attendance: 38,050

Pool E	12 March	Cuba	1–4	Israel	Tokyo Dome
Pool E	12:00 UTC+9	LP: Yera; HR: Despaigne	Boxscore	WP: Thornton; Sv: Zeid	Attendance: 43,153

Pool E	14 March	Cuba	5–8	Japan	Tokyo Dome
Pool E	19:00 UTC+9	LP: Lahera; HR: Gracial	Boxscore	WP: Akiyoshi; Sv: Makita; HR: Yamada (2)	Attendance: 32,717

Pool E	15 March	Netherlands	14–1 (F/7)	Cuba	Tokyo Dome
Pool E	12:00 UTC+9	WP: Markwell; HR: Balentien (2), DeCaster, Sams	Boxscore	LP: Blanco	Attendance: 40,680

=== 2023 World Baseball Classic ===
Pool A	8 March	Cuba	2–4	Netherlands	Taichung Stadium
Pool A	12:00 UTC+8	LP: García	Boxscore	WP: Méndez; Sv: Floranus	Attendance: 6,501

Pool A	9 March	Italy	6–3 (F/10)	Cuba	Taichung Stadium
Pool A	19:00 UTC+8	WP: Festa	Boxscore	LP: Martínez	Attendance: 6,217

Pool A	10 March	Cuba	13–4	Panama	Taichung Stadium
Pool A	12:30 UTC+8	WP: Romero	Boxscore	LP: Hardy; HR: Tejada	Attendance: 7,023

Pool A	12 March	Chinese Taipei	1–7	Cuba	Taichung Stadium
Pool A	12:00 UTC+8	LP: Chen	Boxscore	WP: Leyva; HR: Arruebarrena, Moncada	Attendance: 18,852

Quarterfinals	15 March	Australia	3–4	Cuba	Tokyo Dome
Quarterfinals	19:00 UTC+9	LP: Guyer; HR: Wingrove	Boxscore	WP: Romero; Sv: Martínez	Attendance: 35,061

Semifinals	19 March	Cuba	2–14	United States	LoanDepot Park
Semifinals	19:00 UTC–4	LP: Elías	Boxscore	WP: Wainwright; HR: Goldschmidt, Turner (2), Mullins	Attendance: 35,779

=== 2026 World Baseball Classic ===
Pool A	6 March	Cuba	3–1	Panama	Hiram Bithorn Stadium
Pool A	12:00 UTC+8	WP: Moinelo; Sv: R. Martínez; HR: Guibert, Moncada	Boxscore	LP: Allen	Attendance: 10,015

Pool A	8 March	Colombia	4–7	Cuba	Hiram Bithorn Stadium
Pool A	12:00 UTC+8	LP: Patiño	Boxscore	WP: Larrondo; Sv: R. Martínez; HR: A. Martínez, Arruebarrena	Attendance: 10,957

Pool A	9 March	Cuba	1–4	Puerto Rico	Hiram Bithorn Stadium
Pool A	19:00 UTC+8	LP: Robaina	Boxscore	WP: Rodríguez; Sv: Díaz	Attendance: 19,189

Pool A	11 March	Canada	7–2	Cuba	Hiram Bithorn Stadium
Pool A	15:00 UTC+8	WP: Quantrill; HR: Toro	Boxscore	LP: Moinelo	Attendance: 10,610

== Head-to-head record ==
Positive record Neutral record Negative record

Opponent	Pld	W	L	RS	RA	RD	Win %
Australia	3	3	0	13	10	+3	100%
Brazil	1	1	0	5	2	+3	100%
Canada	1	0	1	2	7	–5	0%
China	2	2	0	18	0	+18	100%
Chinese Taipei	2	2	0	21	1	+20	100%
Colombia	1	1	0	7	4	+3	100%
Dominican Republic	2	1	1	6	8	–2	50%
Israel	1	0	1	1	4	–3	0%
Italy	1	0	1	3	6	–3	0%
Japan	6	1	5	23	43	–20	16.67%
Mexico	2	2	0	23	8	+15	100%
Netherlands	5	1	4	22	33	–11	20%
Panama	3	3	0	24	11	+13	100%
Puerto Rico	3	1	2	7	19	–12	33.33%
South Africa	1	1	0	8	1	+7	100%
United States	1	0	1	2	14	–12	0%
Venezuela	1	1	0	7	2	+5	100%
Total (17)	36	20	16	192	173	+19	55.56%

== Rosters ==
2006 World Baseball Classic roster

Cuba – 2006 World Baseball Classic roster
Players		Coaches
Pitchers: 26 Luis Borroto; 79 Maikel Folch; 32 Norberto González; 48 Yulieski González; 99 Pedro Luis Lazo; 90 Yadel Martí; 58 Jonder Martínez; 97 Yunesky Maya; 23 Vicyohandri Odelín; 16 Adiel Palma; 62 Yadier Pedroso; 81 Yosvani Pérez; 19 Ormari Romero; 4 Deinis Suárez	Catchers: 61 Roger Machado; 8 Ariel Pestano; 55 Eriel Sánchez; Infielders: 54 Leslie Anderson; 53 Ariel Borrero; 12 Michel Enríquez; 10 Yulieski Gurriel; 42 Juan Carlos Moreno; 2 Eduardo Paret; 14 Joan Carlos Pedroso; 11 Rudy Reyes; Outfielders: 24 Frederich Cepeda; 31 Yoandy Garlobo; 21 Alexei Ramírez; 56 Carlos Tabares; 46 Osmani Urrutia	Manager: 39 Higinio Vélez; Coaches: 30 Pedro Pérez (pitching)

2009 World Baseball Classic roster

Cuba – 2009 World Baseball Classic roster
Players		Coaches
Pitchers: 15 Danny Betancourt; 52 Aroldis Chapman; 17 Vladimir García; 32 Norberto González; 48 Yulieski González; 59 Ismel Jiménez; 42 Miguel Lahera; 99 Pedro Luis Lazo; 62 Ciro Licea; 97 Yunesky Maya; 74 Luis Miguel Rodríguez; 92 Yolexis Ulacia; 20 Norge Luis Vera	Catchers: 40 Rolando Meriño; 8 Ariel Pestano; 46 Yosvani Peraza; Infielders: 12 Michel Enríquez; 10 Yulieski Gurriel; 55 Alexander Mayeta; 3 Luis Miguel Navas; 28 Héctor Olivera; 2 Eduardo Paret; 14 Joan Carlos Pedroso; Outfielders: 56 Leslie Anderson; 24 Frederich Cepeda; 51 Yoenis Céspedes; 54 Alfredo Despaigne; 26 Leonys Martín	Manager: 39 Higinio Vélez; Coaches: 22 Enrique Cepero (third base); 34 José Elosegui (pitching); 41 Francisco Escaurido (first base); 21 Lourdes Gourriel (hitting)

2013 World Baseball Classic roster

Cuba – 2013 World Baseball Classic roster
Players		Coaches
Pitchers: 15 Freddy Álvarez; 55 Danny Betancourt; 21 Diosdani Castillo; 43 Odrisamer Despaigne; 34 Vladimir García; 33 Norberto González; 26 Yander Guevara; 28 Raisel Iglesias; 23 Ismel Jiménez; 53 Darien Núñez; 62 Yadier Pedroso; 75 Wilber Pérez; 63 Alexander Rodríguez	Catchers: 45 Frank Morejón; 46 Yosvani Peraza; 5 Eriel Sánchez; Infielders: 79 José Abreu; 11 Erisbel Arruebarrena; 8 José Miguel Fernández; 3 Raúl González; 10 Yulieski Gurriel; 12 Andy Ibáñez; 89 Luis Felipe Rivera; Outfielders: 88 Alexeis Bell; 24 Frederich Cepeda; 54 Alfredo Despaigne; 17 Guillermo Heredia; 27 Yasmany Tomás	Manager: 32 Víctor Mesa; Coaches: 27 Ángel Castillo (first base); 30 Primitivo Díaz (third base); 49 Juan de Dios Peña (pitching); 36 Víctor Figueroa (hitting); 35 Jorge Fuentes; 16 José Ramón Riscart; 6 Pedro Rodríguez

2017 World Baseball Classic roster

Cuba – 2017 World Baseball Classic roster
Players		Coaches
Pitchers: 59 Vladimir Baños; 79 Lázaro Blanco; 90 Noelvis Entenza; 99 José García; 34 Vladimir García; 44 Miguel Lahera; 27 Jonder Martínez; 74 Leandro Martínez; 95 Raidel Martínez; 89 Liván Moinelo; 41 Alain Sánchez; 56 Yosvani Torres; 58 Yoanni Yera	Catchers: 11 Yosvany Alarcón; 31 Osvaldo Vázquez; 45 Frank Morejón; Infielders: 21 Guillermo Avilés; 43 Alexander Ayala; 5 Carlos Benítez; 12 Jefferson Delgado; 47 Yurisbel Gracial; 42 Yordan Manduley; 28 William Saavedra; Outfielders: 24 Frederich Cepeda; 16 Yoelqui Céspedes; 54 Alfredo Despaigne; 32 Víctor Víctor Mesa; 10 Roel Santos	Manager: 25 Carlos Martí; Coaches: 23 Orelvis Ávila (pitching); 46 Orestes Kindelán (hitting); 62 Ciro Licea (pitching); 77 Ramón Rodríguez (third base); 37 Mario Vega (first base)

2023 World Baseball Classic roster

Cuba – 2023 World Baseball Classic roster
Players		Coaches
Pitchers: 22 Frank Álvarez; 57 Ronald Bolaños; 21 Naykel Cruz; 55 Roenis Elías; 98 Onelki García; 53 Elián Leyva; 92 Raidel Martínez; 89 Liván Moinelo; 47 Yeudis Reyes; 30 José Rodríguez; 29 Yariel Rodríguez; 45 Miguel Romero; 85 Carlos Viera; 58 Yoanni Yera	Catchers: 40 Ariel Martínez; 17 Andrys Pérez; 16 Lorenzo Quintana; Infielders: 71 Erisbel Arruebarrena; 44 Dayán García; 27 Yurisbel Gracial; 77 Andy Ibáñez; 8 Luis Vicente Mateo; 10 Yoán Moncada; 5 Yadil Mujica; Outfielders: 52 Yoenis Céspedes; 54 Alfredo Despaigne; 33 Yadir Drake; 7 Yoelkis Guibert; 88 Luis Robert; 1 Roel Santos	Manager: 7 Armando Johnson; Coaches: 24 José Elosegui (pitching); 9 Armando Ferrer (first base); 37 Humberto Guevara; 46 Orestes Kindelán (hitting); 99 Pedro Luis Lazo (pitching); 11 Germán Mesa (bench); 39 Rafael Muñoz (third base); 66 Iván Prieto (bullpen catcher)

2026 World Baseball Classic roster

Cuba – 2026 World Baseball Classic roster
Players		Coaches
Pitchers: 22 Frank Álvarez; 34 Emmanuel Chapman; 30 Josimar Cousín; 3 Armando Dueñas; 25 Denny Larrondo; 35 Yoan López; 92 Raidel Martínez; 90 Randy Martínez; 89 Liván Moinelo; 62 Darien Núñez; 38 Julio Robaina; 15 Osiel Rodríguez; 29 Yariel Rodríguez; 16 Miguel Romero; 18 Pedro Santos	Catchers: 3 Omar Hernández; 17 Andrys Pérez; Infielders: 71 Erisbel Arruebarrena; 24 Yiddi Cappe; 10 Yoán Moncada; 9 Malcom Núñez; 2 Alexei Ramírez; 95 Cristián Rodríguez; 13 Alexander Vargas; 33 Yoel Yanqui; Outfielders: 54 Alfredo Despaigne; 7 Yoelkis Guibert; 40 Ariel Martínez; 20 Leonel Moas; 1 Roel Santos	Manager: 11 Germán Mesa; Coaches: 19 Jesús Bosmenier (pitching); 51 Cecilio Drake (first base); 39 Noelvis González (bench); 37 Humberto Guevara; 99 Pedro Luis Lazo (pitching); 50 Omar Linares (hitting); 49 Rafael Muñoz (third base)

== Player records ==
=== Batting records ===
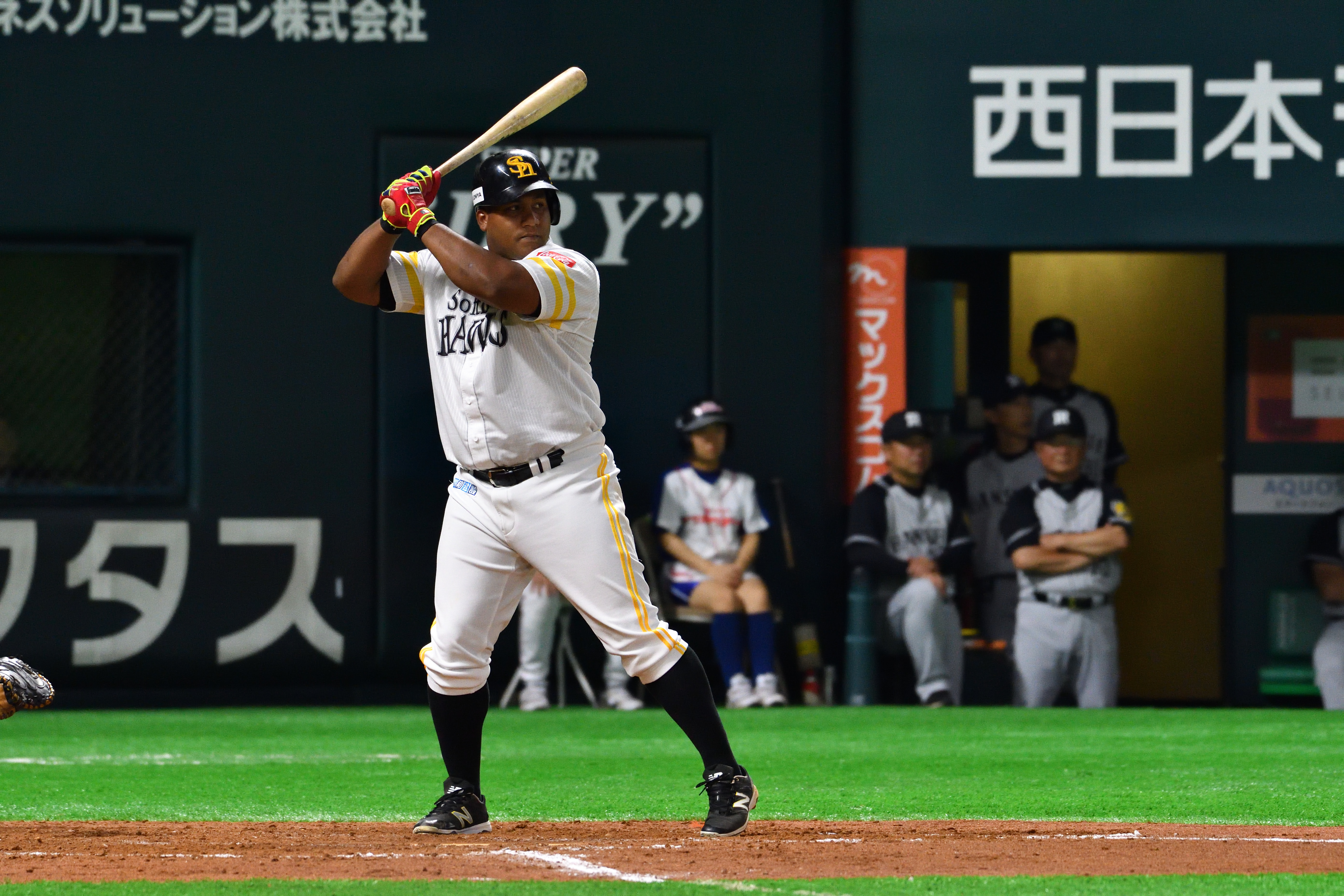
Alfredo Despaigne, leader in games played and home runs, and the only Cuban player to appear in five tournaments.

The following are batting records for the Cuba national team in the World Baseball Classic.

Statistic	Player	Total	WBC apps
Games played	Alfredo Despaigne	26	2009, 2013, 2017, 2023, 2026
Hits	Frederich Cepeda	32	2006, 2009, 2013, 2017
Home runs	Alfredo Despaigne	7	2009, 2013, 2017, 2023, 2026
Runs batted in	Frederich Cepeda	23	2006, 2009, 2013, 2017
Runs	Frederich Cepeda	19	2006, 2009, 2013, 2017

=== Pitching records ===
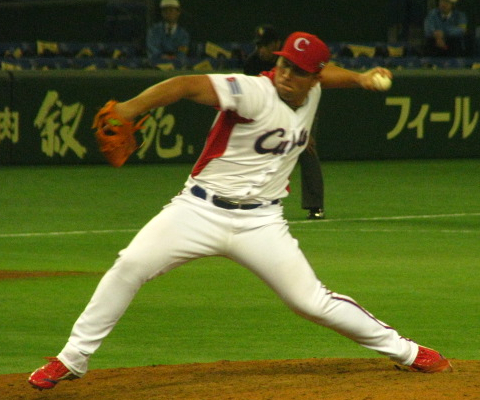
Norberto González, leader in pitching appearances, innings pitched, and strikeouts.

The following are pitching records for the Cuba national team in the World Baseball Classic.

Statistic	Player	Total	WBC apps
Games played	Norberto González	11	2006, 2009, 2013
Innings pitched	Norberto González	17.0	2006, 2009, 2013
Strikeouts	Norberto González	14	2006, 2009, 2013
Strikeouts	Ismel Jiménez	14	2009, 2013
Wins	Ormari Romero	2	2006
Wins	Norge Luis Vera	2	2009
Wins	Danny Betancourt	2	2009, 2013
Wins	Ismel Jiménez	2	2009, 2013
Wins	Miguel Romero	2	2023, 2026
Saves	Pedro Luis Lazo	2	2006, 2009
Saves	Yadel Martí	2	2006
Saves	Raidel Martínez	2	2017, 2023, 2026

== Managers ==
No.	Nat.	Name	WBCs	G	W	L	Win %	Achievements
1	(Cuba)	Higinio Vélez	2006, 2009	14	9	5	.643	1 Silver medal (2006)
2	(Cuba)	Víctor Mesa	2013	6	4	2	.667	–
3	(Cuba)	Carlos Martí	2017	6	2	4	.333	–
4	(Cuba)	Armando Johnson	2023	6	3	3	.500	–
5	(Cuba)	Germán Mesa	2026	4	2	2	.500	–
Totals	5 managers		6 WBCs	36	20	16	.556	

== Awards ==
=== All-World Baseball Classic Team ===
- 2006: Yadel Martí, Pitcher
- 2006: Yuli Gurriel, Second baseman
- 2006: Yoandy Garlobo, Designated hitter
- 2009: Frederich Cepeda, Outfielder
- 2009: Yoenis Céspedes, Outfielder
- 2023: Miguel Romero, Pitcher
- 2023: Yoán Moncada, Third baseman
