= 2009 World Baseball Classic Pool B =

Pool B of the First Round of the 2009 World Baseball Classic was held at Foro Sol, Mexico City, Mexico from March 8 to 12, 2009.

Pool B was a modified double-elimination tournament. The winners for the first games matched up in the second game, while the losers faced each other in an elimination game. The winners of the elimination game then played the losers of the non-elimination game in another elimination game. The remaining two teams then played each other to determine seeding for the Pool 1.

== Bracket ==
Preliminaries
–	South Africa	1
–	Cuba	8
–	Australia	17
–	Mexico	7
Lower round 1
L1	South Africa	3
L2	Mexico	14

Qualifiers
W1	Cuba	5
W2	Australia	4
Lower final
W3	Mexico	16
L4	Australia	1

Seeding
W4	Cuba	16
W5	Mexico	4

== Results ==
- All times are Central Standard Time (UTC−06:00).

=== Cuba 8, South Africa 1 ===
March 8 12:00 at Foro Sol
Team	1	2	3	4	5	6	7	8	9	R	H	E
South Africa	0	0	0	0	0	0	0	0	1	1	4	0
Cuba	1	2	2	0	2	1	0	0	X	8	13	0
WP: Norge Luis Vera (1−0) LP: Barry Armitage (0−1); Home runs: RSA: None; CUB: Frederich Cepeda 2 (2), Alfredo Despaigne (1), Héctor Olivera (1), Yulieski Gourriel (1), Yoenis Céspedes (1); Attendance: 11,270 (43.3%); Umpires: HP − Ted Barrett, 1B − Seok-hwan Oh, 2B − Lance Barksdale, 3B − Edgar Estivison; Boxscore

=== Australia 17, Mexico 7 ===
March 8 19:00 at Foro Sol
Team	1	2	3	4	5	6	7	8	9	R	H	E
Australia	3	1	0	0	3	3	4	3	X	17	22	2
Mexico	5	1	1	0	0	0	0	0	X	7	12	1
WP: Damian Moss (1−0) LP: Ricardo Rincón (0−1); Home runs: AUS: Luke Hughes (1), Chris Snelling 2 (2), Ben Risinger (1); MEX: Jorge Vázquez (1), Alfredo Amézaga (1); Attendance: 20,821 (80.1%); Umpires: HP − Greg Gibson, 1B − Seong-hoon Moon, 2B − Lance Barksdale, 3B − Seok-hwan Oh; Notes: Completed early due to 10–run mercy rule after 8 innings. Boxscore

=== Mexico 14, South Africa 3 ===
March 9 20:00 at Foro Sol
Team	1	2	3	4	5	6	7	8	9	R	H	E
Mexico	1	0	2	0	0	0	3	4	4	14	16	2
South Africa	1	0	1	0	0	0	1	0	0	3	7	2
WP: Elmer Dessens (1−0) LP: Justin Erasmus (0−1); Home runs: MEX: Adrián González 2 (2), Óscar Robles (1), Jorge Cantú (1); RSA: None; Attendance: 10,311 (39.7%); Umpires: HP − Lance Barksdale, 1B − Seok-hwan Oh, 2B − Greg Gibson, 3B − Seong-hoon Moon; Boxscore

=== Cuba 5, Australia 4 ===
March 10 20:00 at Foro Sol
Team	1	2	3	4	5	6	7	8	9	R	H	E
Cuba	0	0	1	0	0	1	1	2	0	5	9	1
Australia	0	0	0	1	0	3	0	0	0	4	6	1
WP: Ismel Jimenez (1−0) LP: Rich Thompson (0−1); Home runs: CUB: Yoenis Céspedes (2), Yosvani Peraza (1); AUS: None; Attendance: 13,396 (51.5%); Umpires: HP − Ted Barrett, 1B − Edgar Estivison, 2B − Greg Gibson, 3B − Seong-hoon Moon; Boxscore

=== Mexico 16, Australia 1 ===
March 11 20:00 at Foro Sol
Team	1	2	3	4	5	6	7	8	9	R	H	E
Mexico	0	0	4	7	1	4	X	X	X	16	13	0
Australia	0	0	0	1	0	0	X	X	X	1	6	0
WP: Jorge Campillo (1−0) LP: David Welch (0−1); Home runs: MEX: Scott Hairston (1), Karim García 2 (2); AUS: Brett Roneberg (1); Attendance: 16,718 (64.3%); Umpires: HP − Greg Gibson, 1B − Seok-hwan Oh, 2B − Ted Barrett, 3B − Edgar Estivison; Notes: Completed early due to 15–run mercy rule after 6 innings. Boxscore

=== Cuba 16, Mexico 4 ===
March 12 19:00 at Foro Sol
Team	1	2	3	4	5	6	7	8	9	R	H	E
Mexico	0	0	2	1	1	0	0	X	X	4	5	0
Cuba	1	0	1	5	0	0	9	X	X	16	17	1
WP: Yulieski González (1−0) LP: Dennys Reyes (0−1); Home runs: MEX: Freddy Sandoval (2), Óscar Robles (1), Karim García (3); CUB: Yulieski Gourriel (2), Ariel Pestano (1), Frederich Cepeda (3); Attendance: 20,149 (77.5%); Umpires: HP − Lance Barksdale, 1B − Edgar Estivison, 2B − Ted Barrett, 3B − Seong-hoon Moon; Notes: Completed early due to 10–run mercy rule after 7 innings. One out when last run scored. Boxscore
