= Yosvani Peraza =

Cuban baseball player (born 1979)

- Catcher / First baseman
- Born: 9 February 1979 (age 47); San Juan y Martínez, Pinar del Río Province, Cuba
- Bats: Right Throws: Right

Teams
- Pinar del Río (1998–2015)

Yosvani Peraza Marín (Gordo) (born 9 February 1979) is a Cuban professional baseball catcher in the Cuban National Series and Cuba national baseball team.

== Career ==
Peraza was born on 9 February 1979 in San Juan y Martínez in the Pinar del Río Province. He played for Cuba in the 1996 World Junior Baseball Championship, hitting .429 with 20 total bases in 21 at-bats and eight RBI. He was second in average and probably first in slugging on the Gold Medal winners. Josh Bard beat him out for All-Star catcher honors in the event. Peraza also was in the 1997 Junior Pan American Games. In the 1997 World Junior Championship, he again led Cuba to Gold, hitting .500 and slugging .875 with 10 runs and 9 RBI in 5 round-robin games. He was named to the All-Star team at catcher this time. He debuted in the Cuban Serie Nacional in the 1997–1998 season.

Peraza hit .333/.387/.544 for Pinar del Río in 2000-2001. In the 2001 World Port Tournament, he went 0 for 11 to tie Bárbaro Cañizares as Cuba's worst hitter. In the 2001–2002 season, Gordo batted .251/.326/.367. The next season, he hit .283/.338/.495 with 17 home runs and 58 RBI.

In 2003-2004, the hefty catcher produced at a .301/.343/.487 clip with 16 homers and 67 runs batted in. He tied Loidel Chapellí and Osmani Urrutia for the league lead in RBI and was three homers behind leader Reinier Yero.

Peraza batted .326/.389/.550 with 16 circuit clouts and 65 RBI in the 2004–2005 Serie Nacional. In 2005-2006, he hit .303/.422/.544 with 17 home runs and 54 RBI, tying for 8th in the Serie Nacional in homers.

Peraza kept it up in 2006-2007, batting .322/.389/.533 with 17 home runs and 63 RBI. He tied Yohenis Cespedes for third in home runs, trailing Alexei Ramírez and Joan Carlos Pedroso. He finished 6th in total bases and 8th in RBI. He was just 2 for 20 in the playoffs, though.

In the 2007 World Port Tournament, he was far better than he had been in the 2001 event, hitting .419/~.486/.710 with 3 home runs and 18 RBI in nine games. He tied Pedro Alvarez and Alfredo Despaigne for second in homers, one behind José Julio Ruiz. He easily led in RBI, 10 ahead of Despaigne. He tied Despaigne and Jordan Danks for second in hits (13), behind Carlos Tabares. He tied Danks for second in average, trailing Despaigne. He was also third in slugging and OBP. His dominant performance helped him win World Port Tournament Most Valuable Player honors.

In the 2007 Baseball World Cup, Peraza backed up Ariel Pestano and got into three games. He was 2 for 7 with a long 3-run homer against Thailand as Cuba won Silver, its first time falling short of Gold in a Baseball World Cup in 25 years (and in 1982, it was because they sat out).

Peraza continued his slugging into 2008. In the Cuban All-Star Game, he hit a walk-off homer against Jorge Longo in the bottom of the 9th to give his Occidentales a 6-5 win over the Orientales. He won MVP honors.

Peraza hit .336/.465/.672 in the 2007–2008 season with 25 homers and 77 RBI in 79 games. He was 4th in the Serie Nacional in slugging and third in homers behind Alexei Bell and Yohenis Céspedes. He also ranked among the leaders in total bases (tied with Joan Carlos Pedroso for 9th with 180), RBI (5th) and walks (tied with Yoandy Garlobo for 8th with 60). His 37 intentional walks were 14 more than runner-up Garlobo as he led the circuit. Peraza was named to the Serie Nacional All-Star team at DH.

Peraza backed up Michel Enríquez at DH for Cuba in the 2009 World Baseball Classic and batted cleanup twice. He was 4 for 9 with a homer and 3 runs in the event, putting him third on the Cuban squad in average, slugging, OBP and OPS behind Frederich Cepeda and Yoenis Céspedes. Peraza powered Cuba to a 5-4 win over Australia; pinch-hitting for Joan Carlos Pedroso with a 4-3 deficit, 2 outs and one on in the bottom of the 8th against Rich Thompson, Peraza smacked a game-winning 2-run homer. He got three hits in a win over Mexico but then came up empty in his third game, against Japan.

Peraza hit .329/.462/.663 in 2008-2009 with 23 homers, tied for 5th in the league. He was 4th in slugging behind Alfredo Despaigne, Yulieski Gourriel and Joan Carlos Pedroso. He led with 24 intentional walks. Defensively, he was second with 11 passed balls but threw out 20 of 38 attempted base-stealers.

A motorcycle injury ended Peraza's 2009–2010 season early.

Peraza signed with the Autovia Castenaso of the Italian Baseball League for the 2019 season, playing in 22 games and hitting .253/.333/.361 with two home runs and seven RBI.
