= Yoelkis Guibert =

Cuban baseball player (born 1994)

- Guibert with Santiago de Cuba in 2022

Senadores de Caracas – No. 28
- Outfielder
- Born: August 29, 1994 (age 32); Palma Soriano, Santiago de Cuba, Cuba
- Bats: Left Throws: Left
Medals
Men's baseball
Representing Cuba
Central American and Caribbean Games
Silver medal – second place	2023 San Salvador	Team
Caribbean Cup
Silver medal – second place	2022 Nassau	Team

Yoelkis Guibert Stevens (Note: Also listed as Yoelquis Guibert) (born August 29, 1994) is a Cuban professional baseball outfielder who currently plays for the Senadores de Caracas of the Venezuelan Major League. He also plays for the Avispas de Santiago de Cuba of the Cuban National Series and for the Cuba national baseball team.

== Career ==
Guibert played baseball at the youth level for Santiago, helping the team to two back-to-back titles in Cuba’s U-23 league.

In the Mexican Pacific League, Guibert played two seasons with the Tomateros de Culiacán, helping the team win the 2021 LMP championship while hitting .313 over 22 games. Notably, the Baseball Federation of Cuba denied him permission to represent the team at the 2021 Caribbean Series. He moved to the Algodoneros de Guasave for the 2023–24 season. In 2025, he was signed by the Indios del Bóer of the Nicaraguan Winter League.

He played in the Frontier League with the Québec Capitales in 2022, but was released after hitting .225 in 27 games with the Canadian squad. Ahead of the 2024 Mexican Baseball League season, Guibert was in contract negotiations with the Toros de Tijuana before ultimately signing with the Charros de Jalisco; however, the contract ultimately fell through and he instead player in the Venezuelan Major League with the Senadores de Caracas. He remained with Caracas for the 2025 and 2026 seasons.

Guibert has been a stalwart of the Cuban national team, drawing comparisons to fellow outfielder Roel Santos. At the 2023 Pan American Games, he went 4-14, hitting .289 and on-basing .333. At the 2023 World Baseball Classic, Guibert drove in two runs, hitting .333 (6-18) as Cuba finished in fourth place. At the 2023 Central American and Caribbean Games, he knocked in 7 runs and hit .481. At the 2024 WBSC Premier12, he posted a less-impressive slash line of .167/.250/.333. At the 2026 World Baseball Classic, Guibert scored Cuba's first run, a solo home run off Panama's Logan Allen. He was one of the bright spots of Cuba's offense at the 2026 WBC, hitting .231, third best on the team behind Ariel Martinez and Yiddi Cappe.
