= 2013 World Baseball Classic Pool A =

Baseball competition

Pool A of the First Round of the 2013 World Baseball Classic was held at Fukuoka Dome, Fukuoka, Japan from March 2 to 6, 2013.

Pool A was a round-robin tournament. Each team played the other three teams once, with the top two teams advancing to Pool 1.

== Standings ==
Pos	Team	Pld	W	L	RF	RA	RD	PCT	GB	Qualification
1	Cuba	3	3	0	23	5	+18	1.000	—	Advance to second round Qualification for 2017 World Baseball Classic
2	Japan (H)	3	2	1	13	11	+2	.667	1	Advance to second round Qualification for 2017 World Baseball Classic
3	China	3	1	2	7	19	−12	.333	2	Qualification for 2017 World Baseball Classic
4	Brazil	3	0	3	7	15	−8	.000	3	

Rules for classification: Tiebreakers
(H) Hosts

Pool A MVP: (Cuba) Alfredo Despaigne

== Results ==
- All times are Japan Standard Time (UTC+09:00).

=== Japan 5, Brazil 3 ===
March 2 19:00 at Fukuoka Dome
Team	1	2	3	4	5	6	7	8	9	R	H	E
Japan	0	0	1	1	0	0	0	3	0	5	7	1
Brazil	1	0	0	1	1	0	0	0	0	3	9	0
WP: Tadashi Settsu (1−0) LP: Oscar Nakaoshi (0−1) Sv: Kazuhisa Makita (1); Attendance: 28,181 (73.1%); Umpires: HP − Chris Guccione, 1B − Poong-ki Kim, 2B − Alfonso Márquez, 3B − Carlos Rey; Boxscore

Brazil got on the board first in the bottom of the first inning with an RBI-single by third baseman Leonardo Reginatto that scored center fielder Paulo Orlando. After a scoreless second inning, Japan tied the game in the third inning via an RBI single by right fielder Yoshio Itoi scoring shortstop Hayato Sakamoto. Sakamoto hit an RBI single of his own in the fourth inning to give Japan a 2-1 advantage. Designated hitter Reinaldo Sato tied the game in the bottom of the fourth with an RBI single that scored Reginatto. Reginatto doubled in the fifth for his second RBI once again scoring Orlando. Pinch hitter Hirokazu Ibata came off the bench to tie the game with a single that scored Seiichi Uchikawa in the eighth inning. Later in the inning, Japan scored two insurance runs via a fielders choice and a single making the score 5-3. Closer Kazuhisa Makita got the save after throwing a scoreless ninth inning.

=== Cuba 5, Brazil 2 ===
March 3 12:30 at Fukuoka Dome
Team	1	2	3	4	5	6	7	8	9	R	H	E
Cuba	0	0	0	0	2	3	0	0	0	5	8	1
Brazil	0	0	0	0	0	2	0	0	0	2	6	1
WP: Ismel Jiménez (1−0) LP: André Rienzo (0−1) Sv: Raisel Iglesias (1); Attendance: 4,003 (10.4%); Umpires: HP − Alfonso Márquez, 1B − Carlos Rey, 2B − Chris Guccione, 3B − Felix Tejada; Boxscore

After the first four innings were scoreless, Cuba struck first in the top of the fifth inning scoring two runs. The first was off center fielder Guillermo Heredia's RBI ground out to shortstop which scored second baseman Jose Fernandez, while the second was an RBI single by right fielder Alexei Bell which scored shortstop Erisbel Arruebarruena to put the Cubans up 2-0. Cuba added three more runs in the top of the sixth via an RBI fielder's choice and then a 2-RBI single by Arruebarruena. It wasn't until the bottom of the sixth that Brazil got on the board, scoring two runs. The first was off of an RBI infield single by Daniel Matsumoto to score Felipe Burin, while the second came off of a double play scoring Leonardo Reginatto. After the sixth inning, there was no more scoring for the remainder of the game. Cuban ace Ismel Jimenez got the win after throwing 4 2/3 innings giving up four hits and striking out six without surrendering a single run. Reliever Raciel Iglesias threw the final three innings of the game and got the save after surrendering no runs and giving up only one hit and striking out five.

=== Japan 5, China 2 ===
March 3 19:00 at Fukuoka Dome
Team	1	2	3	4	5	6	7	8	9	R	H	E
China	0	0	0	0	0	0	0	0	2	2	3	2
Japan	0	1	0	0	4	0	0	0	X	5	6	0
WP: Kenta Maeda (1−0) LP: Xia Luo (0−1); Attendance: 13,891 (36.0%); Umpires: HP − Gerry Davis, 1B − Chris Guccione, 2B − Felix Tejada, 3B − Poong-ki Kim; Boxscore

After a scoreless first in the bottom of the second Japan got an RBI single by Sho Nakata. In the bottom of the 4th Japan scored 4 runs making it 5-0 Japan. China retaliated in the top of the 9th scoring two runs making the final 5-2 Japan.

=== Cuba 12, China 0 ===
March 4 16:30 at Fukuoka Dome
Team	1	2	3	4	5	6	7	8	9	R	H	E
China	0	0	0	0	0	0	0	X	X	0	3	2
Cuba	1	0	1	4	6	0	X	X	X	12	15	0
WP: Danny Betancourt (1−0) LP: Li Xin (0−1); Home runs: CHN: None; CUB: Alexei Bell (1), José Abreu (1); Attendance: 3,123 (8.1%); Umpires: HP – Chris Guccione, 1B – Carlos Rey, 2B – Gerry Davis, 3B – Poong-ki Kim; Notes: Completed early due to 10–run mercy rule after 7 innings. Boxscore

China was only able to muscle 3 hits in a 12-0 loss to a powerful Cuba team.

=== China 5, Brazil 2 ===
March 5 17:00 at Fukuoka Dome
Team	1	2	3	4	5	6	7	8	9	R	H	E
Brazil	0	1	0	0	0	0	1	0	0	2	6	0
China	0	0	0	0	0	0	0	5	X	5	6	1
WP: Jiangang Lü (1−0) LP: Murilo Gouvea (0−1); Attendance: 3,110 (8.1%); Umpires: HP − Alfonso Márquez, 1B − Gerry Davis, 2B − Felix Tejada, 3B − Poong-ki Kim; Boxscore

As both China and Brazil entered the game with 0−2 records, neither had a chance of advancing to the second round. However, with its eighth-inning rally leading to a win, China clinched third place in the pool and an automatic berth in the 2017 tournament.

=== Cuba 6, Japan 3 ===
March 6 19:00 at Fukuoka Dome
Team	1	2	3	4	5	6	7	8	9	R	H	E
Japan	0	0	0	0	0	0	0	0	3	3	7	0
Cuba	0	0	1	1	0	1	0	3	X	6	10	1
WP: Wilber Pérez (1−0) LP: Kenji Otonari (0−1); Home runs: JPN: None; CUB: Yasmany Tomás (1), Alfredo Despaigne (1); Attendance: 26,860 (69.7%); Umpires: HP − Gerry Davis, 1B − Alfonso Márquez, 2B − Carlos Rey, 3B − Felix Tejada; Boxscore

Cuba clinched first place in the pool with the win.
