= 2013 World Baseball Classic Pool 1 =

Baseball tournament results

Pool 1 of the Second Round of the 2013 World Baseball Classic was held at Tokyo Dome, Tokyo, Japan from March 8 to 12, 2013.

Pool 1 was a modified double-elimination tournament. The winners for the first games matched up in the second game, while the losers faced each other in an elimination game. The winners of the elimination game then played the losers of the non-elimination game in another elimination game. The remaining two teams then played each other to determine seeding for the semifinals.

== Bracket ==
Preliminaries
BR	Netherlands	6
AW	Cuba	2
AR	Japan	4
BW	Chinese Taipei	3
Lower round 1
L1	Cuba	14
L2	Chinese Taipei	0

Qualifiers
W1	Netherlands	4
W2	Japan	16
Lower final
W3	Cuba	6
L4	Netherlands	7

Seeding
W4	Japan	10
W5	Netherlands	6

Pool 1 MVP: (Japan) Hirokazu Ibata

== Results ==
- All times are Japan Standard Time (UTC+09:00).

=== Netherlands 6, Cuba 2 ===
March 8 12:00 at Tokyo Dome
Team	1	2	3	4	5	6	7	8	9	R	H	E
Netherlands	0	2	0	0	0	3	0	1	0	6	14	0
Cuba	0	1	0	0	0	0	1	0	0	2	12	2
WP: Diego Markwell (2−0) LP: Ismel Jimenez (1−1); Home runs: NED: Curt Smith (1), Jonathan Schoop (1); CUB: Alfredo Despaigne (1), Yulieski Gourriel (1); Attendance: 38,588 (91.9%); Umpires: HP − Alfonso Márquez, 1B − Gerry Davis, 2B − Trevor Grieve, 3B − Carlos Rey; Boxscore

=== Japan 4, Chinese Taipei 3 ===
March 8 19:00 at Tokyo Dome
Team	1	2	3	4	5	6	7	8	9	10	R	H	E
Japan	0	0	0	0	0	0	0	2	1	1	4	13	0
Chinese Taipei	0	0	1	0	1	0	0	1	0	0	3	11	0
WP: Kazuhisa Makita (1−0) LP: Hung-wen Chen (0−1) Sv: Toshiya Sugiuchi (1); Attendance: 43,527 (103.6%); Umpires: HP − Chris Guccione, 1B − Trevor Grieve, 2B − Gerry Davis, 3B − Felix Tejada; Boxscore

=== Cuba 14, Chinese Taipei 0 ===
March 9 19:00 at Tokyo Dome
Team	1	2	3	4	5	6	7	8	9	R	H	E
Chinese Taipei	0	0	0	0	0	0	0	X	X	0	4	1
Cuba	2	0	0	4	0	8	X	X	X	14	12	0
WP: Danny Betancourt (2−0) LP: Ching-lung Lo (0−1); Home runs: TPE: None; CUB: Frederich Cepeda (1), Yasmany Tomás (1), José Abreu (1), Alfredo Despaigne (2); Attendance: 12,884 (30.7%); Umpires: HP − Gerry Davis, 1B − Carlos Rey, 2B − Chris Guccione, 3B − Felix Tejada; Notes: Completed early due to 10–run mercy rule after 7 innings. Boxscore

=== Japan 16, Netherlands 4 ===
March 10 19:00 at Tokyo Dome
Team	1	2	3	4	5	6	7	8	9	R	H	E
Japan	1	5	1	3	1	1	4	X	X	16	17	0
Netherlands	0	0	0	0	0	4	0	X	X	4	6	3
WP: Kenta Maeda (2−0) LP: Rob Cordemans (1−1); Home runs: JPN: Takashi Toritani (1), Nobuhiro Matsuda (1), Seiichi Uchikawa (1), Atsunori Inaba (1), Yoshio Itoi (1), Hayato Sakamoto (1); NED: None; Attendance: 37,745 (89.9%); Umpires: HP − Alfonso Márquez, 1B − Chris Guccione, 2B − Felix Tejada, 3B − Trevor Grieve; Notes: Completed early due to 10–run mercy rule after 7 innings. Boxscore

=== Netherlands 7, Cuba 6 ===
March 11 19:00 at Tokyo Dome
Team	1	2	3	4	5	6	7	8	9	R	H	E
Cuba	0	0	0	2	2	0	0	2	0	6	12	2
Netherlands	0	0	2	2	0	0	0	2	1	7	12	0
WP: Loek van Mil (1−0) LP: Yander Guevara (0−1); Home runs: CUB: José Abreu (2); NED: Andrelton Simmons (1); Attendance: 7,613 (18.1%); Umpires: HP − Chris Guccione, 1B − Alfonso Márquez, 2B − Carlos Rey, 3B − Trevor Grieve; Notes: Two outs when winning run scored. Boxscore

=== Japan 10, Netherlands 6 ===
March 12 19:00 at Tokyo Dome
Team	1	2	3	4	5	6	7	8	9	R	H	E
Netherlands	1	0	0	0	0	0	2	3	0	6	10	0
Japan	0	8	0	0	0	0	0	2	X	10	9	0
WP: Kenji Otonari (1−1) LP: David Bergman (0−1); Home runs: NED: Andrelton Simmons (2); JPN: Shinnosuke Abe 2 (2); Attendance: 30,301 (72.1%); Umpires: HP − Gerry Davis, 1B − Alfonso Márquez, 2B − Carlos Rey, 3B − Felix Tejada; Boxscore
