= Pestano =

Pestano is a Spanish surname. Notable people with the surname include:

- Ariel Pestano (born 1974), better known as El Veterano ("The Veteran"), Cuban baseball player
- Mario Pestano (born 1978), Spanish discus thrower
- Vinnie Pestano (born 1985), American baseball player
