= 2017 World Baseball Classic Pool B =

Pool B of the First Round of the 2017 World Baseball Classic was held at Tokyo Dome, Tokyo, Japan from March 7 to 10, 2017, between Australia, China, Cuba and Japan. Pool B was a round-robin tournament. Each team played the other three teams once, with the top two teams advancing to Pool E.

Two-time champions Japan concluded Pool B with a 3–0 record, whereas China lost all three games after their poor performances and must now qualify for the 2021 World Baseball Classic. Cuba defeated Australia to advance to the second round.

== Standings ==
Pos	Team	Pld	W	L	RF	RA	RD	PCT	GB	Qualification
1	Japan (H)	3	3	0	22	8	+14	1.000	—	Advance to second round
2	Cuba	3	2	1	16	14	+2	.667	1	Advance to second round
3	Australia	3	1	2	15	8	+7	.333	2	
4	China	3	0	3	1	24	−23	.000	3	

(H) Hosts

Pool B MVP: (Japan) Yoshitomo Tsutsugoh

== Results ==
- All times are Japan Standard Time (UTC+09:00).

=== Japan 11, Cuba 6 ===
March 7, 19:00 at Tokyo Dome
Team	1	2	3	4	5	6	7	8	9	R	H	E
Cuba	0	0	1	0	0	0	3	2	0	6	11	3
Japan	1	0	0	1	5	0	2	2	X	11	14	1
WP: Ayumu Ishikawa (1−0) LP: Yoanni Yera (0−1); Home runs: CUB: Alfredo Despaigne (1); JPN: Nobuhiro Matsuda (1), Yoshitomo Tsutsugoh (1); Attendance: 44,908 (106.9%); Umpires: HP − Todd Tichenor, 1B − Fabrizio Fabrizzi, 2B − Su-won Choi, 3B − Cory Blaser; Boxscore

=== Cuba 6, China 0 ===
March 8, 12:00 at Tokyo Dome
Team	1	2	3	4	5	6	7	8	9	R	H	E
China	0	0	0	0	0	0	0	0	0	0	1	0
Cuba	0	0	0	4	0	1	1	0	X	6	14	1
WP: Vladimir Baños (1−0) LP: Xia Luo (0−1); Attendance: 39,102 (93.1%); Umpires: HP − Su-won Choi, 1B − Larry Vanover, 2B − Todd Tichenor, 3B − Fabrizio Fabrizzi; Boxscore

=== Japan 4, Australia 1 ===
March 8, 19:00 at Tokyo Dome
Team	1	2	3	4	5	6	7	8	9	R	H	E
Japan	0	0	0	0	1	0	1	2	0	4	8	1
Australia	0	1	0	0	0	0	0	0	0	1	5	0
WP: Kodai Senga (1−0) LP: Matthew Williams (0−1) Sv: Kazuhisa Makita (1); Home runs: JPN: Sho Nakata (1), Yoshitomo Tsutsugoh (2); AUS: Allan de San Miguel (1); Attendance: 41,408 (98.6%); Umpires: HP − Cory Blaser, 1B − Todd Tichenor, 2B − Chien-wen Su, 3B − Fabrizio Fabrizzi; Boxscore

=== Australia 11, China 0 ===
March 9, 19:00 at Tokyo Dome (F/8)
Team	1	2	3	4	5	6	7	8	9	R	H	E
Australia	0	0	2	2	0	0	3	4	X	11	9	0
China	0	0	0	0	0	0	0	0	X	0	5	0
WP: Travis Blackley (1−0) LP: Kwon Ju (0−1); Home runs: AUS: Luke Hughes (1), James Beresford (1); CHN: None; Attendance: 3,013 (7.2%); Umpires: HP − Larry Vanover, 1B − Su-won Choi, 2B − Cory Blaser, 3B − Chien-wen Su; Notes: Completed early due to 10–run mercy rule after 8 innings. Boxscore

=== Cuba 4, Australia 3 ===
March 10, 12:00 at Tokyo Dome
Team	1	2	3	4	5	6	7	8	9	R	H	E
Australia	0	0	0	0	1	0	1	1	0	3	13	1
Cuba	0	0	0	0	4	0	0	0	X	4	10	0
WP: Vladimir García (1−0) LP: Lachlan Wells (0−1) Sv: Miguel Lahera (1); Home runs: AUS: Trent Oeltjen (1); CUB: Alfredo Despaigne (2); Attendance: 38,050 (90.6%); Umpires: HP − Todd Tichenor, 1B − Fabrizio Fabrizzi, 2B − Larry Vanover, 3B − Su-won Choi; Boxscore

=== Japan 7, China 1 ===
March 10, 19:00 at Tokyo Dome
Team	1	2	3	4	5	6	7	8	9	R	H	E
China	0	0	1	0	0	0	0	0	0	1	5	3
Japan	1	2	2	0	0	0	2	0	X	7	8	0
WP: Shota Takeda (1−0) LP: Quan Gan (0−1); Home runs: CHN: None; JPN: Seiji Kobayashi (1), Sho Nakata (2); Attendance: 40,053 (95.4%); Umpires: HP − Cory Blaser, 1B − Larry Vanover, 2B − Chien-wen Su, 3B − Su-won Choi; Boxscore
