= 2017 World Baseball Classic Pool E =

Pool E of the Second Round of the 2017 World Baseball Classic, a quarter-final round in the tournament, was held at Tokyo Dome, Tokyo, Japan, from March 12 to 15, 2017.

The round was between Team Israel (won Pool A; ranked 41st in the world), Team Japan (won Pool B; ranked 1st in the world), Team Cuba (second in Pool B; ranked 5th in the world), and the Netherlands (second in Pool A; ranked 9th in the world). Pool E was a round-robin tournament. Each team played the other three teams once, with the top two teams advancing to the semifinals.

Undefeated Japan (3−0) and the Netherlands (2−1) advanced to the semi-final round, as Israel (1−2) came in third in the pool, and Cuba (0−3) came in fourth.

== Standings ==
Pos	Team	Pld	W	L	RF	RA	RD	PCT	GB	Qualification
1	Japan (H)	3	3	0	24	14	+10	1.000	—	Advance to championship round
2	Netherlands	3	2	1	32	11	+21	.667	1	Advance to championship round
3	Israel	3	1	2	9	21	−12	.333	2	
4	Cuba	3	0	3	7	26	−19	.000	3	

Rules for classification: Tiebreakers
(H) Hosts

Pool E MVP: (Netherlands) Wladimir Balentien

== Results ==
- All times are Japan Standard Time (UTC+09:00).

=== Israel 4, Cuba 1 ===
March 12, 12:00 at Tokyo Dome
Team	1	2	3	4	5	6	7	8	9	R	H	E
Cuba	0	1	0	0	0	0	0	0	0	1	5	1
Israel	0	0	0	1	0	2	0	1	X	4	5	0
WP: Zack Thornton (1−0) LP: Yoanni Yera (0−2) Sv: Josh Zeid (2); Home runs: CUB: Alfredo Despaigne (1); ISR: None; Attendance: 43,153 (102.7%); Umpires: HP − Todd Tichenor, 1B − Cory Blaser, 2B − Trevor Grieve, 3B − Jens Waider; Boxscore

In the first game of the second round, Team Israel, undefeated in the first round, beat Team Cuba (5th-ranked in the world) by a score of 4−1. Former Major Leaguer Jason Marquis (in 5.2 innings on three days' rest) and three Team Israel relief pitchers (including Brad Goldberg and Josh Zeid, who both threw 96 mph fastballs) kept Team Cuba to five hits and one run, a homer by Cuban star Alfredo Despaigne who became the all-time World Baseball Classic home run leader. Pool A MVP catcher Ryan Lavarnway had two hits for Israel.

=== Japan 8, Netherlands 6 ===
March 12, 19:00 at Tokyo Dome (F/11)
Team	1	2	3	4	5	6	7	8	9	10	11	R	H	E
Japan	0	1	4	0	1	0	0	0	0	0	2	8	15	0
Netherlands	0	1	4	0	0	0	0	0	1	0	0	6	12	0
WP: Kazuhisa Makita (1−0) LP: Tom Stuifbergen (0−1); Home runs: JPN: Sho Nakata (1); NED: Jonathan Schoop (1), Wladimir Balentien (1); Attendance: 44,326 (105.5%); Umpires: HP − Félix Tejada, 1B − Larry Vanover, 2B − Cory Blaser, 3B − Trevor Grieve; Notes: Extra inning rule was used in 11th inning. Boxscore

Japan, undefeated in the first round, beat the Netherlands 8−6 in 11 innings. The game lasted nearly five hours, and ended at 11:56 p.m. in Japan. The stadium scoreboard reminded fans younger than 18 to leave the stadium before midnight to comply with a juvenile safety law, and many fans left.

=== Netherlands 12, Israel 2 ===
March 13, 19:00 at Tokyo Dome (F/8)
Team	1	2	3	4	5	6	7	8	9	R	H	E
Netherlands	0	2	4	4	0	0	0	2	X	12	15	1
Israel	0	0	0	1	0	0	1	0	X	2	8	0
WP: Jair Jurrjens (1−0) LP: Corey Baker (1−1); Home runs: NED: Didi Gregorius (1); ISR: Nate Freiman (1); Attendance: 5,017 (11.9%); Umpires: HP − Cory Blaser, 1B − Félix Tejada, 2B − Todd Tichenor, 3B − Jens Waider; Notes: Completed early due to 10–run mercy rule after 8 innings. Boxscore

In a rematch of the Pool A game in which Israel prevailed, the Netherlands defeated Israel 12–2 on March 13, giving Israel their first loss of the tournament. The game ended after eight innings with the application of the 10-run mercy rule.

=== Japan 8, Cuba 5 ===
March 14, 19:00 at Tokyo Dome
Team	1	2	3	4	5	6	7	8	9	R	H	E
Cuba	0	2	0	2	0	1	0	0	0	5	10	1
Japan	1	0	1	0	2	1	0	3	X	8	9	0
WP: Ryo Akiyoshi (1−0) LP: Miguel Lahera (0−1) Sv: Kazuhisa Makita (2); Home runs: CUB: Yurisbel Gracial (1); JPN: Tetsuto Yamada 2 (2); Attendance: 32,717 (77.9%); Umpires: HP − Larry Vanover, 1B − Trevor Grieve, 2B − Jens Waider, 3B − Todd Tichenor; Boxscore

Japan beat Cuba 8−5, backed by two home runs from designated hitter Tetsuto Yamada.

=== Netherlands 14, Cuba 1 ===
March 15, 12:00 at Tokyo Dome (F/7)
Team	1	2	3	4	5	6	7	8	9	R	H	E
Netherlands	3	1	3	5	1	0	1	X	X	14	13	0
Cuba	0	0	0	0	1	0	0	X	X	1	5	2
WP: Diego Markwell (1−0) LP: Lázaro Blanco (0−1); Home runs: NED: Wladimir Balentien 2 (3), Yurendell DeCaster (1), Kalian Sams (1); CUB: None; Attendance: 40,680 (96.9%); Umpires: HP − Todd Tichenor, 1B − Trevor Grieve, 2B − Félix Tejada, 3B − Larry Vanover; Notes: Completed early due to 10–run mercy rule after 7 innings. Boxscore

The Netherlands defeated Cuba 14−1, eliminating Cuba from contention to advance to the semi-final round, in a game ended after seven innings under the World Baseball Classic's mercy rule.

=== Japan 8, Israel 3 ===
March 15, 19:00 at Tokyo Dome
Team	1	2	3	4	5	6	7	8	9	R	H	E
Israel	0	0	0	0	0	0	0	0	3	3	5	0
Japan	0	0	0	0	0	5	0	3	X	8	13	1
WP: Yoshihisa Hirano (1−0) LP: Dylan Axelrod (0−1); Home runs: ISR: None; JPN: Yoshitomo Tsutsugoh (1); Attendance: 43,179 (102.8%); Umpires: HP − Cory Blaser, 1B − Larry Vanover, 2B − Trevor Grieve, 3B − Félix Tejada; Boxscore

Undefeated two-time WBC champion Team Japan beat Team Israel, 8−3.
