= Lahera =

Lahera is a surname. Notable people with the surname include:

- Miguel Lahera (born 1985), Cuban baseball player
- Yaudel Lahera (born 1992), Cuban footballer
