= Julio Robaina (baseball) =

Cuban baseball player (born 2001)

Atlanta Braves
- Pitcher
- Born: March 23, 2001 (age 25); San Antonio de los Baños, Artemisa, Cuba
- Bats: Left Throws: Left

Julio César Robaina Fuentes (born March 23, 2001) is a Cuban professional baseball pitcher in the Atlanta Braves organization. He represented Cuba at the 2026 World Baseball Classic.

== Early career ==
Robaina was born on March 23, 2001, in San Antonio de los Baños, Artemisa Province. He played baseball for the Ariguanabo youth club and represented Cuba at the under-15 and under-16 levels. He left Cuba in 2016.

== Professional career ==
=== Houston Astros ===
On September 22, 2017, Robaina signed with the Houston Astros organization. He made his professional debut with the Gulf Coast League Astros in 2018. In 2019, he split the season between the GCL Astros, the Quad Cities River Bandits, and the Tri-City ValleyCats. Robaina did not play in a game in 2020 due to the cancellation of the minor league season because of the COVID-19 pandemic.

Robaina returned to action in 2021 with the Asheville Tourists and Fayetteville Woodpeckers. He spent the 2022 and 2023 seasons with the Corpus Christi Hooks. In 2024, he appeared for Corpus Christi, the Triple–A Sugar Land Space Cowboys, and Asheville. Robaina elected free agency following the season on November 4, 2024.

=== Tigres de Quintana Roo ===
On May 11, 2025, Robaina signed with the Tigres de Quintana Roo of the Mexican League. He appeared in 16 games, recording four wins, six losses, and a 3.17 ERA.

=== Kansas City Monarchs ===
On August 28, 2025, Robaina joined the Kansas City Monarchs of the American Association. He appeared in just one game for the Monarchs, against the Milwaukee Milkmen, pitching five innings and posting a 1.80 ERA.

=== Tigres de Quintana Roo (second stint) ===
On January 28, 2026, Robaina was re-signed by the Tigres de Quintana Roo. Robaina made four starts for Quintana Roo, compiling a 2-0 record and 1.47 ERA with 15 strikeouts across 18 1/3 innings pitched.

=== Atlanta Braves ===
On May 12, 2026, Robaina signed a minor league contract with the Atlanta Braves.

=== Winter baseball ===
Robaina has played winter baseball in the Dominican Republic, Venezuela and Mexico. He played for the Estrellas Orientales of the Dominican Professional Baseball League during the 2023–24 season, for the Leones del Caracas of the Venezuelan Professional Baseball League during the 2024–25 season, and for the Algodoneros de Guasave of the Mexican Pacific League during the 2025–26 season.

== International career ==
In February 2026, Robaina was selected to represent Cuba at the 2026 World Baseball Classic. He appeared in one game, the 4–1 loss to Puerto Rico, pitching 1 1/3 innings with a 20.25 ERA and taking the loss.
