= Armando Johnson =

Cuban baseball player and manager

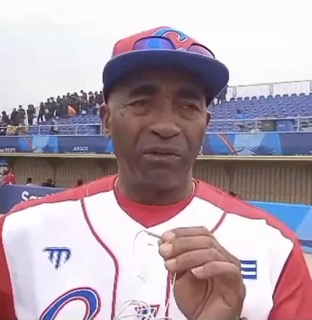
- Johnson at the 2023 Pan American Games
- Outfielder / Manager
- Born: 15 June 1958 (age 68); Isla de la Juventud, Cuba
Medals
Men's baseball
Manager for Cuba
Central American and Caribbean Games
Silver medal – second place	2023 San Salvador	Team
Caribbean Cup
Gold medal – first place	2023 Puerto Rico	Team

Armando Johnson Zaldívar (born 15 June 1958) is a Cuban baseball manager and former outfielder who managed Cuba at the 2023 World Baseball Classic.

== Career ==
Johnson was born on 15 June 1958 in Isla de la Juventud. He played twelve seasons in the Cuban National Series from 1977 to 1989 with the Isla de la Juventud team as center fielder. After retiring, he managed Isla de Juventud from 1990 until 2014, when he was fired. Since 2004, Johnson also managed youth national teams in Cuba such as the U-15 and U-23 Cuban national baseball teams.

On 7 September 2022, Johnson was appointed as manager of the Cuba national baseball team ahead of the 2023 World Baseball Classic with a two-year contract until the end of the 2024 WBSC Premier12. Johnsons's first tournament was the 2022 Caribbean Baseball Cup held in The Bahamas, where the Cuban team finished second after losing in the final against Puerto Rico.

In 2023, the Cuban team under Johnson finished fourth in the 2023 World Baseball Classic and won the silver medal at the 2023 Central American and Caribbean Games held in San Salvador. Cuba won the 2023 Caribbean Baseball Cup hosted by Puerto Rico. In the last tournament of 2023, Cuba finished sixth in the 2023 Pan American Games.

Cuba participated in the 2024 WBSC Premier12, finishing last in their group in the opening round with a 1–4 record, a result that Cuban media described as a failure. On 25 February 2025, Johnson was dismissed as manager of the Cuban national team and replaced by Germán Mesa ahead of the 2026 World Baseball Classic.
