= Ariel Martínez (baseball) =

Cuban baseball player (born 1996)

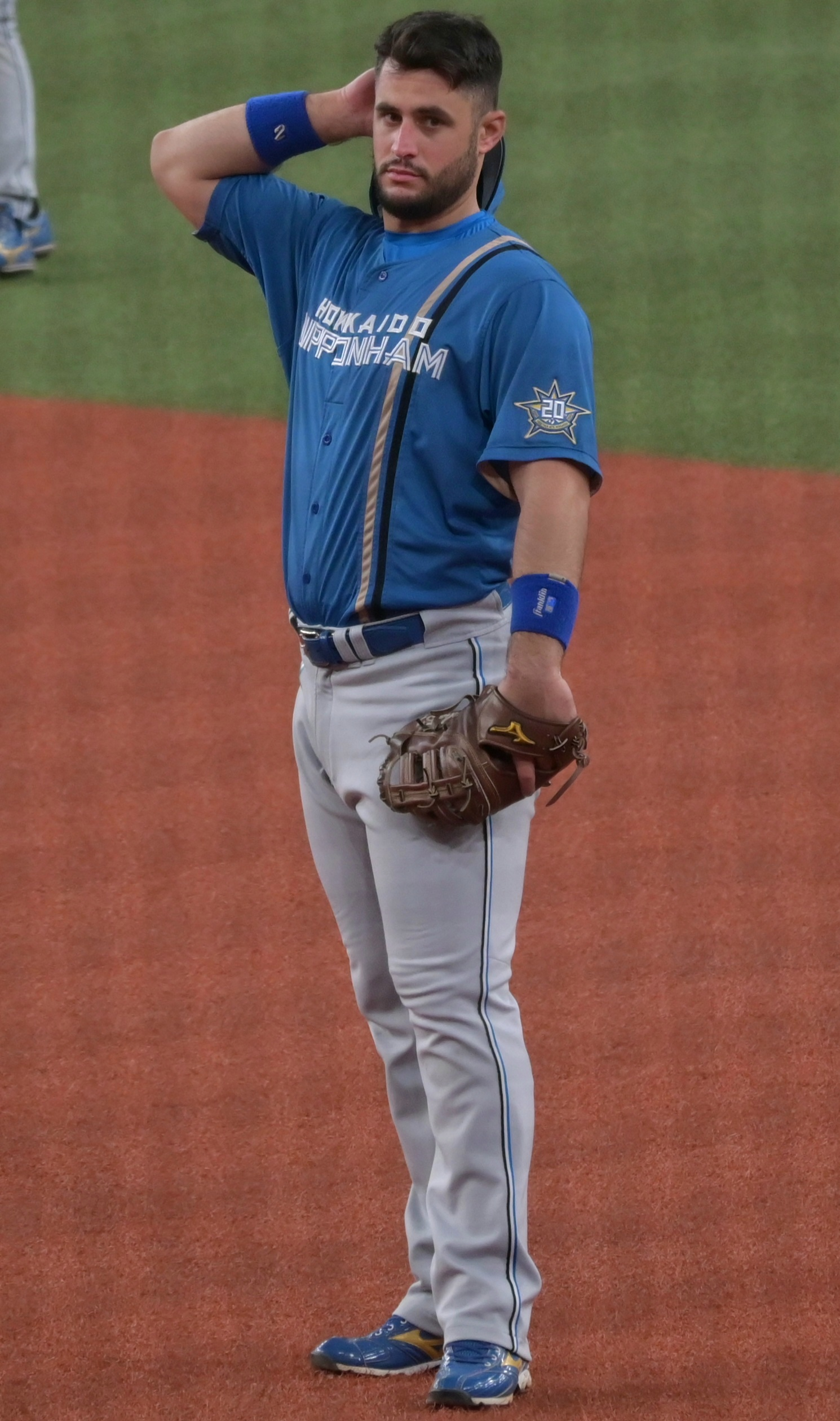
- Martinez with the Hokkaido Nippon-Ham Fighters in 2023

Hokkaido Nippon-Ham Fighters – No. 2
- Catcher / Left Fielder
- Born: May 28, 1996 (age 30); Matanzas, Cuba
- Bats: Right Throws: Right

NPB debut
- July 3, 2020, for the Chunichi Dragons

NPB statistics (through August 18, 2026)
- Batting average: .245
- Home runs: 43
- Runs batted in: 179
- Stats at Baseball Reference

Teams
- Chunichi Dragons (2018–2022); Hokkaido Nippon-Ham Fighters (2023–present)

Career highlights and awards
- 2x NPB All-Star (2023, 2024); 1x NPB All-Star Game Fighting Spirit Award (2023)

Ariel Martínez Marrero (born May 28, 1996) is a Cuban professional baseball catcher for the Hokkaido Nippon-Ham Fighters of Nippon Professional Baseball (NPB). He has previously played in NPB for the Chunichi Dragons and in the Cuban National Series for the Cocodrilos de Matanzas.

== Professional career ==
=== Chunichi Dragons ===
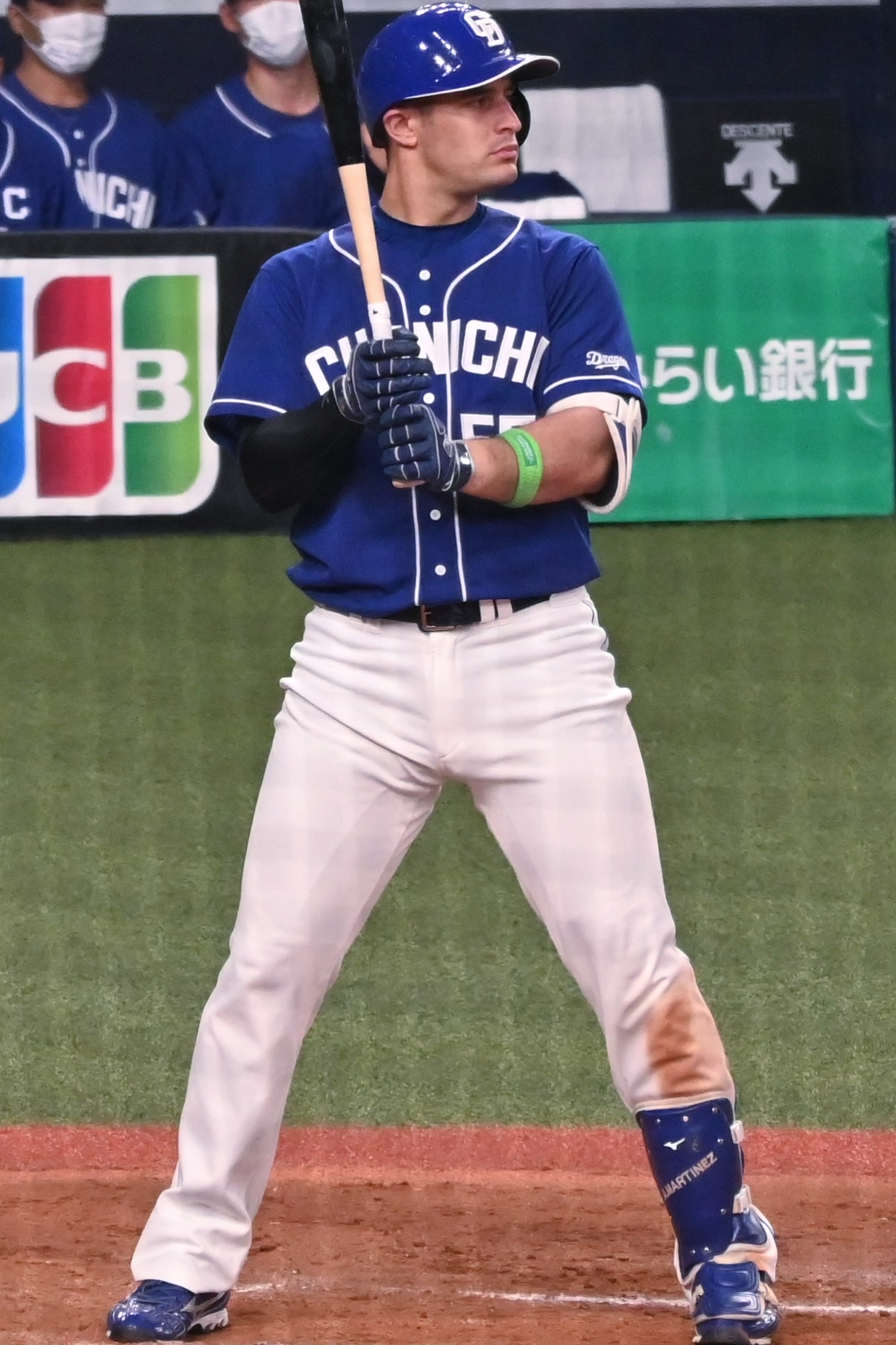
Martinez with the Chunichi Dragons in 2022

On March 14, 2018, Martínez signed with the Chunichi Dragons on a developmental contract. He spent the 2018 and 2019 seasons with Chunichi's farm team. On July 1, 2020, Martinez was given a full-time rostered deal and a new shirt number, 57. Martínez notched 5 hits in 18 plate appearances for Chunichi in 2020. The Cuban catcher Ariel Martinez shone again on Wednesday in Japanese baseball, when he hit a homer that led to the victory of the Chunichi Dragons over the Yakult Swallows. Playing left field, the versatile Martinez went 2-3, with a run scored and a walk, to leave his average at .333, and get the only run of the game, which ended 1-0 in favor of his team. He became a free agent following the 2022 season.

=== Hokkaido Nippon-Ham Fighters ===
On December 21, 2022, Martinez signed with the Hokkaido Nippon-Ham Fighters of Nippon Professional Baseball.

== Personal life ==
Like most of the Cuban children from his generation, Ariel Martínez admires legendary Cuban catcher Ariel Pestano. His primary example is Kansas City Royals catcher Salvador Pérez. He tries to watch films based on him often and he definitely enjoys catching plenty of Kansas City Royals games on television when he can.
