= Kenji Otonari =

Japanese baseball player (born 1984)

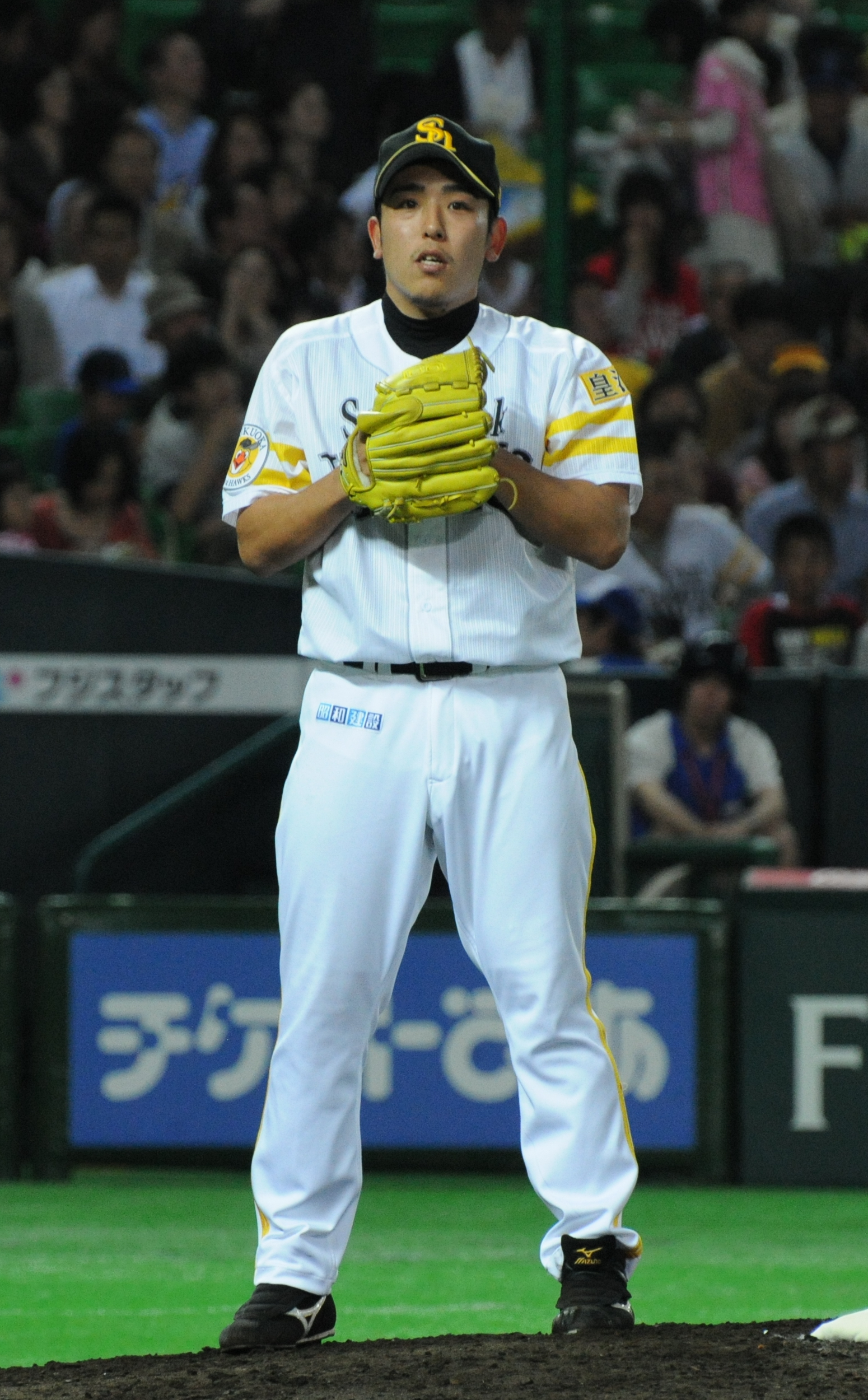
- Otonari with the Fukuoka SoftBank Hawks

Chiba Lotte Marines – No. 78
- Pitcher / Coach
- Born: November 19, 1984 (age 41); Kyoto, Japan
- Batted: Left Threw: Left

NPB debut
- June 9, 2007, for the Fukuoka SoftBank Hawks

Last NPB appearance
- October 3, 2018, for the Chiba Lotte Marines

NPB statistics (through 2017 season)
- Win–loss record: 52-48
- ERA: 3.29
- Strikeouts: 650
- Stats at Baseball Reference

Teams
- As player: Fukuoka SoftBank Hawks (2007–2017); Chiba Lotte Marines (2018); As coach: Chiba Lotte Marines (2019–present)

Career highlights and awards
- NPB All-Star (2012); 2× Japan Series champion (2011, 2014)

Kenji Otonari (大隣 憲司, Ōtonari Kenji; born November 19, 1984), nicknamed "Tonarin", is a former Japanese baseball pitcher.

== Professional career ==
=== Fukuoka SoftBank Hawks ===
Otonari was drafted in 2007 and made his first starts late in the year as the Hawks prepared for the playoffs. His first start was an Interleague start against the Hiroshima Toyo Carp and he went seven innings, giving up two runs on seven hits, walking three and striking out four. He would be credited with the win, but could not duplicate his success as he gave up 3 runs or more in 5 of his next 7 starts.

In his first full season in 2008, the young lefty had a successful season. The first two starts he made, Ōtonari notched complete game victories, also only giving up one run in 18 innings while recording 18 strikeouts. Despite losing the next two starts, Ōtonari still threw 8 innings in each start. The rest of the season was a roller-coaster ride, as his success seemed to hinge on how many batters he struck out. Late in the season, he suffered an elbow injury that prematurely ended his season. Still, Ōtonari finished with a respectable 11–8 with a 3.12 ERA, spinning six complete games in 21 starts, striking out 138 batters in 155 and 2/3 innings.

The elbow injury seemed to linger with Ōtonari in 2009, as he was slow to start and did not have a quality start until May 6. He was demoted to ni-gun in early June and did not return until later in the month. In September, Ōtonari was sent to the bullpen and after five appearances there, he seemed to respond at the end of the month, recording two consecutive quality starts. However, he was sent back to the bullpen for the playoffs, where his Hawks were knocked out in the first round.

The 2010 season was also rough for Ōtonari, but mostly because in 13 of his 19 starts, the Hawks offense scored three runs or less in games that he started. He was doing very well in his lone playoff start, throwing five shutout innings, but he was lifted to go to the bullpen in a game the Hawks lost en route to a heartbreaking series loss that left them one game from the Japan Series.

In 2011 season, Ōttonari finished the regular season with a 3–0 record, a 2.34 ERA.

In 2012 season, Ōttonari got a career high record. He finished the regular season with a 12–8 record, with a 2.03 ERA, spinning 6 complete games and 3 shutouts games in 25 starts, striking out 134 batters in 177 and 1/3 innings. On November 3, Ōttonari pitched for Japan national baseball team in the "Samurai Japan Match 2012".

On February 20, 2013, Ōttonari was elected a member of Japan national baseball team of the 2013 World Baseball Classic. He pitched in Game 6 of the Pool A on Mar 6 against the Cuba and Game 4 of the Pool 1 on Mar 10 against the Netherlands. In June, Ōttonari was diagnosed as suffering from ossification of the yellow ligament of intractable disease. On June 21, he underwent surgery. After that he spent the regular season for rehabilitation. Ōttonari finished the regular season with a 3–3 record, a 3.38 ERA.

On July 13, 2014, Ōttonari returned and threw as relief pitcher against the Hokkaido Nippon-Ham Fighters, for the first time in 408 days after the secession. On July 22, he threw and won as a starting pitcher against Orix Buffaloes, for the first time in 422 days after the secession. On October 2, Ōttonari took the mound for the final race of the season when Hawks and Buffaloes fight for the Pacific League championship. He threw six innings with four hits, seven strikeouts, no runs, and led the Hawks to Pacific League champion. On October 28, Ōttonari took the mound in Game 3 of the Japan Series against the Hanshin Tigers. He became a winning pitcher at his professional career's first in Japan Series and contributed to the team's Japan Series champion. Ōttonari finished the regular season with a 3–1 record, a 1.64 ERA.

In 2015 season, Ōttonari finished the regular season with a 5–4 record, a 2.34 ERA in 72 and 1/3 innings.

In 2016-2017 season, Ōttonari could only board one game in the regular season. On November 3, 2017, the Fukuoka SoftBank Hawks released Ōttonari.

== Pitching style ==
A left-handed junkballer, Ōtonari generally throws his fastball in the mid to high-80s, but has shown that he can get strikeouts with his breaking pitches, very similar to former teammate Toshiya Sugiuchi. However, Ōtonari does not have the same caliber of control that Sugiuchi does, and thus is prone to walks. The statistics on Ōtonari show that the more strikeouts that he gets, the better his start seems to go. Ōtonari throws a four-seam fastball, slider, changeup, and forkball.
