= 2009 World Baseball Classic Pool 1 =

Pool 1 of the Second Round of the 2009 World Baseball Classic was held at Petco Park, San Diego, California, United States from March 15 to 19, 2009. Like the first round, Pool 1 was a modified double-elimination tournament. The final two teams played against each other for seeding and both advanced to the semifinals.

== Bracket ==
Preliminaries
AR | Japan | 6
BW | Cuba | 0
BR | Mexico | 2
AW | South Korea | 8
Lower round 1
L1 | Cuba | 7
L2 | Mexico | 4

Qualifiers
W1 | Japan | 1
W2 | South Korea | 4
Lower final
W3 | Cuba | 0
L4 | Japan | 5

Seeding
W4 | South Korea | 2
W5 | Japan | 6

== Results ==
- All times are Pacific Daylight Time (UTC−07:00).

=== Japan 6, Cuba 0 ===
March 15 13:00 at Petco Park
| Team | 1 | 2 | 3 | 4 | 5 | 6 | 7 | 8 | 9 | R | H | E |
|---|---|---|---|---|---|---|---|---|---|---|---|---|
| Japan | 0 | 0 | 3 | 1 | 1 | 0 | 0 | 0 | 1 | 6 | 12 | 2 |
| Cuba | 0 | 0 | 0 | 0 | 0 | 0 | 0 | 0 | 0 | 0 | 8 | 0 |
WP: Daisuke Matsuzaka (2–0) LP: Aroldis Chapman (0–1); Attendance: 20,179 (47.3%); Umpires: HP − Hunter Wendelstedt, 1B − Carlos Rey, 2B − Bill Miller, 3B − Willie Rodriguez; Boxscore

=== South Korea 8, Mexico 2 ===
March 15 20:00 at Petco Park
| Team | 1 | 2 | 3 | 4 | 5 | 6 | 7 | 8 | 9 | R | H | E |
|---|---|---|---|---|---|---|---|---|---|---|---|---|
| Mexico | 0 | 2 | 0 | 0 | 0 | 0 | 0 | 0 | 0 | 2 | 9 | 1 |
| South Korea | 0 | 2 | 0 | 1 | 1 | 0 | 4 | 0 | X | 8 | 12 | 1 |
WP: Hyun-wook Jong (1–0) LP: Oliver Perez (0–1); Home runs: MEX: None; KOR: Bum-ho Lee (1), Tae-kyun Kim (1), Young-min Ko (1); Attendance: 22,337 (52.3%); Umpires: HP − Joe West, 1B − Willie Rodriguez, 2B − Bill Miller, 3B − Paul Hyham; Boxscore

=== Cuba 7, Mexico 4 ===
March 16 20:00 at Petco Park
| Team | 1 | 2 | 3 | 4 | 5 | 6 | 7 | 8 | 9 | R | H | E |
|---|---|---|---|---|---|---|---|---|---|---|---|---|
| Cuba | 1 | 0 | 1 | 0 | 3 | 0 | 2 | 0 | 0 | 7 | 11 | 0 |
| Mexico | 0 | 0 | 1 | 1 | 0 | 0 | 0 | 1 | 1 | 4 | 7 | 0 |
WP: Norge Luis Vera (2–0) LP: Jorge Campillo (1–1) Sv: Pedro Luis Lazo (1); Home runs: CUB: None; MEX: Jorge Cantú (1), Cristhian Presichi (1); Attendance: 9,329 (21.9%); Umpires: HP − Bill Miller, 1B − Paul Hyham, 2B − Hunter Wendelstedt, 3B − Carlos Rey; Boxscore

=== South Korea 4, Japan 1 ===
March 17 20:00 at Petco Park
| Team | 1 | 2 | 3 | 4 | 5 | 6 | 7 | 8 | 9 | R | H | E |
|---|---|---|---|---|---|---|---|---|---|---|---|---|
| Japan | 0 | 0 | 0 | 0 | 1 | 0 | 0 | 0 | 0 | 1 | 7 | 1 |
| South Korea | 3 | 0 | 0 | 0 | 0 | 0 | 0 | 1 | X | 4 | 4 | 0 |
WP: Jung-keun Bong (2–0) LP: Yu Darvish (1–1) Sv: Chang-yong Lim (2); Attendance: 15,332 (35.9%); Umpires: HP − Hunter Wendelstedt, 1B − Carlos Rey, 2B − Joe West, 3B − Willie Rodriguez; Boxscore

=== Japan 5, Cuba 0 ===
March 18 20:00 at Petco Park
| Team | 1 | 2 | 3 | 4 | 5 | 6 | 7 | 8 | 9 | R | H | E |
|---|---|---|---|---|---|---|---|---|---|---|---|---|
| Japan | 0 | 0 | 0 | 2 | 1 | 0 | 1 | 0 | 1 | 5 | 8 | 0 |
| Cuba | 0 | 0 | 0 | 0 | 0 | 0 | 0 | 0 | 0 | 0 | 5 | 1 |
WP: Hisashi Iwakuma (1–1) LP: Yunesky Maya (0–1) Sv: Toshiya Sugiuchi (1); Attendance: 9,774 (22.9%); Umpires: HP − Joe West, 1B − Willie Rodriguez, 2B − Hunter Wendelstedt, 3B − Paul Hyham; Boxscore

=== Japan 6, South Korea 2 ===
March 19 18:00 at Petco Park
| Team | 1 | 2 | 3 | 4 | 5 | 6 | 7 | 8 | 9 | R | H | E |
|---|---|---|---|---|---|---|---|---|---|---|---|---|
| Japan | 0 | 2 | 0 | 0 | 0 | 0 | 0 | 3 | 1 | 6 | 15 | 3 |
| South Korea | 1 | 0 | 0 | 0 | 0 | 0 | 1 | 0 | 0 | 2 | 6 | 3 |
WP: Hideaki Wakui (1–0) LP: Seung-hwan Oh (0–1); Home runs: JPN: Seiichi Uchikawa (1); KOR: Bum-ho Lee (2); Attendance: 14,832 (34.7%); Umpires: HP − Bill Miller, 1B − Paul Hyham, 2B − Joe West, 3B − Carlos Rey; Boxscore
