= Raidel Martínez =

Cuban baseball player (born 1996)

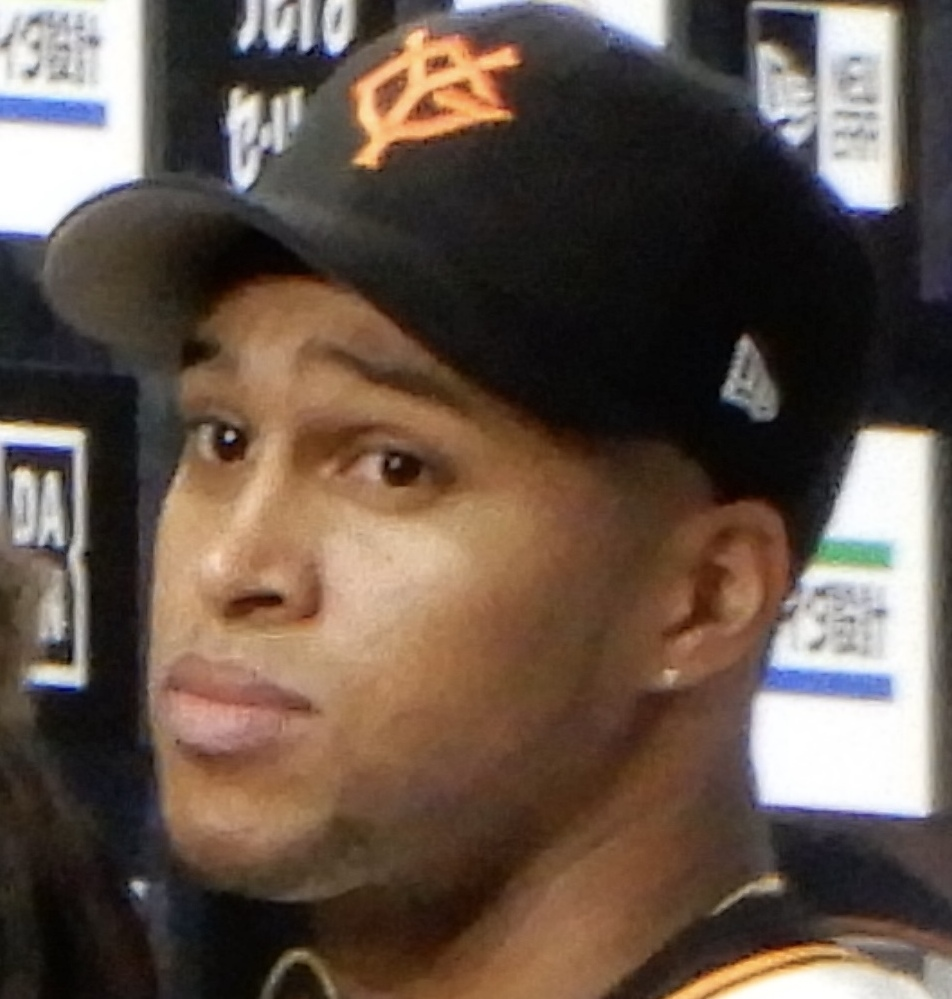
- Martínez with the Yomiuri Giants in 2025

Yomiuri Giants – No. 92
- Pitcher
- Born: October 11, 1996 (age 29); Pinar del Río, Cuba
- Bats: Right Throws: Right

NPB debut
- May 6, 2018, for the Chunichi Dragons

NPB statistics (through August 18, 2026)
- Win–loss record: 20-23
- Earned Run Average: 1.62
- Strikeouts: 461
- Saves: 243
- Stats at Baseball Reference

Teams
- Chunichi Dragons (2018–2024); Yomiuri Giants (2025–present)

Career highlights and awards
- 4× NPB All-Star (2022–2025); 3× NPB Saves Leader (2022, 2024–2025)
Medals
Men's baseball
Representing Cuba
Central American and Caribbean Games
Silver medal – second place	2018 Barranquilla	Team

Raidel Martínez Perez (born October 11, 1996) is a Cuban professional baseball pitcher for the Yomiuri Giants of Nippon Professional Baseball (NPB). He has previously played in NPB for the Chunichi Dragons.

== Professional career ==
=== Chunichi Dragons ===
On February 26, 2017, Martínez signed with the Chunichi Dragons of Nippon Professional Baseball. After spending the 2017 season with the club's farm team, Martínez recorded his first NPB victory on May 15, 2018, in a win over the Hiroshima Toyo Carp. However, he struggled to a 6.65 ERA in 7 games. In 2019, Martínez recorded a stellar 2.66 ERA with 48 strikeouts in 43 appearances. In 2020, he pitched to a 1.13 ERA in 40 innings across 40 appearances.

On May 27, 2022, Martínez made his first NPB All-Star appearance at Matsuyama Central Park Baseball Stadium. He took the mound in the eighth inning and allowed one hit but kept one scoreless inning. Martínez made 60 appearances out of the bullpen for Chunichi in 2024, compiling a 2–3 record and 1.09 ERA with 59 strikeouts and 43 saves across 58 innings pitched.

=== Yomiuri Giants ===
On December 16, 2024, Martínez signed with the Yomiuri Giants of Nippon Professional Baseball.

== International career ==
Martínez previously pitched for Vegueros de Pinar del Rio in the Cuban National Series. Martinez played for the Cuba national baseball team at the 2017 World Baseball Classic and the 2023 World Baseball Classic.
