= Ormari Romero =

Cuban baseball player

Medal record

Men's baseball

Representing Cuba

World Baseball Classic
| Silver medal – second place | 2006 San Diego | Team |

Olympic Games
| Gold medal – first place | 1996 Atlanta | Team |

Baseball World Cup
| Gold medal – first place | 2003 Havana | Team |
| Gold medal – first place | 2005 Rotterdam | Team |

Intercontinental Cup
| Silver medal – second place | 1997 Barcelona | Team |

Pan American Games
| Gold medal – first place | 1999 Winnipeg | Team |

Ormari Romero Turcás (born February 22, 1968, in Segundo Frente, Santiago de Cuba Province, Cuba) is a right-handed pitcher for the Cuba national baseball team and Santiago de Cuba of the Cuban National Series.

Romero was part of the Cuba national baseball team that brought home the gold medal from the 1996 Summer Olympics. He was 2–1 for the silver medal-win by Cuba at the 2006 World Baseball Classic.
