= Yander Guevara =

Cuban baseball player (born 1986)

- Pitcher
- Born: 18 January 1986 (age 40); Ciego de Ávila Province, Cuba
- Bats: Right Throws: Right
Medals
Men's baseball
Representing Cuba
Pan American Games
Bronze medal – third place	2015 Toronto	Team
Caribbean Cup
Silver medal – second place	2021 Curaçao	Team

Yander Guevara Morales (born 18 January 1986) is a Cuban former baseball pitcher. Guevara played 14 seasons in the Cuban National Series, from 2007 to 2022. He represented Cuba at the 2013 World Baseball Classic, the 2015 Pan American Games, winning the bronze medal, and the 2021 Caribbean Baseball Cup, winning the silver medal.

== Career ==
Guevara was born on 18 January 1986 in the Ciego de Ávila Province. He made his Cuban National Series debut in 2008, with Ciego de Ávila, appearing in 17 games, posting an 8–3 record with 93.0 innings pitched and a 3.00 ERA.

On 21 October 2020, Guevara earned his 100th win in the Cuban National Series, becoming the 28th pitcher in the history of the competition to reach the milestone. He retired after the 2021–22 season with a career record of 115–80.

== International career ==
Guevara represented Cuba at the 2013 World Baseball Classic. He appeared in three games, posting 3.1 innings pitched with a 2.70 ERA and one loss against the Netherlands in the second round of the tournament.

In 2015, Guevara won the bronze medal at the 2015 Pan American Games in Toronto.

In 2021, Guevara was selected to represent Cuba at the 2021 Caribbean Baseball Cup, where the team won the silver medal, losing the championship game to Curaçao.
