= Roel Santos =

Cuban baseball player (born 1987)

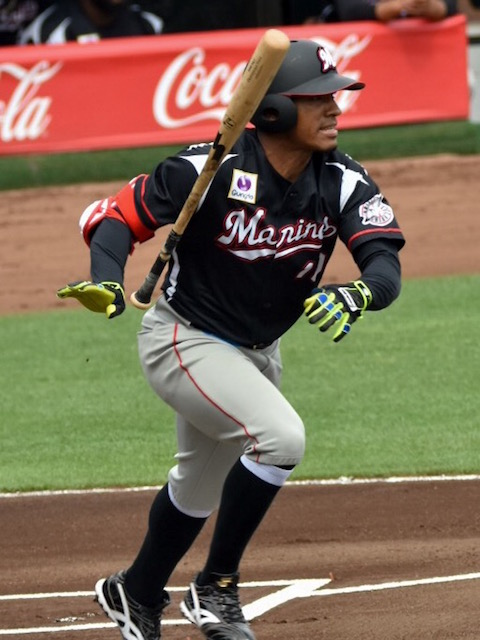
- Santos with the Chiba Lotte Marines

Conspiradores de Querétaro – No. 1
- Outfielder
- Born: September 15, 1987 (age 38); Niquero, Granma Province, Cuba
- Bats: Left Throws: Left

NPB debut
- May 31, 2017, for the Chiba Lotte Marines

NPB statistics (through 2017 season)
- Batting average: .250
- Hits: 45
- Home runs: 3
- Runs batted in: 8
- Stats at Baseball Reference

Teams
- Chiba Lotte Marines (2017)
Medals
Men's baseball
Representing Cuba
Pan American Games
Bronze medal – third place	2015 Toronto	Team
Central American and Caribbean Games
Silver medal – second place	2018 Barranquilla	Team
Silver medal – second place	2023 San Salvador	Team
Caribbean Cup
Gold medal – first place	2023 Puerto Rico	Team

Roel Santos Martinez (born September 15, 1987) is a Cuban professional baseball outfielder for the Conspiradores de Querétaro of the Mexican League. He has previously played in Nippon Professional Baseball (NPB) for the Chiba Lotte Marines.

== Career ==
=== Québec Capitales ===
In 2016, Santos played for the Québec Capitales of the Canadian American Association of Professional Baseball. In 78 games for Québec, Santos slashed .301/.370/.353 with 1 home run and 34 RBI.

=== Chiba Lotte Marines ===
On May 18, 2017, Santos signed with the Chiba Lotte Marines of Nippon Professional Baseball. In 66 games for the club, Santos hit .250/.282/.356 with 3 home runs and 8 RBI.

=== Olmecas de Tabasco ===
On June 21, 2019, Santos signed with the Olmecas de Tabasco of the Mexican League. He did not play in a game in 2020 due to the cancellation of the LMB season because of the COVID-19 pandemic. He later became a free agent. On July 19, 2021, Santos re-signed with the Olmecas.

In 2023, Santos played in 63 games for Tabasco, batting .310/.382/.452 with 4 home runs, 30 RBI, and 8 stolen bases.

=== Conspiradores de Querétaro ===
On March 5, 2024, Santos was traded to the Conspiradores de Querétaro of the Mexican League. In 35 games, he batted .356/.447/.496 with two home runs, 22 RBI, and nine stolen bases.

=== Olmecas de Tabasco (second stint) ===
On July 5, 2024, Santos was traded back to the Olmecas de Tabasco of the Mexican League. He made 21 appearances for the team during the remainder of the year, batting .304/.345/.430 with one home run, five RBI, and two stolen bases. Santos played in 57 contests for Tabasco during the 2025 campaign, slashing .324/.400/.500 with six home runs, 29 RBI, and 12 stolen bases.

On April 28, 2026, Santos was released by the Olmecas, having gone 3-for-9 (.333) with one RBI across two games.

=== Conspiradores de Querétaro (second stint) ===
On April 30, 2026, Santos was signed by the Conspiradores de Querétaro of the Mexican League.

== International career ==
Santos played for the Cuba national baseball team in the 2014 Central American and Caribbean Games, 2015 Pan American Games, 2017 World Baseball Classic, 2019 Pan American Games, and 2023 World Baseball Classic.
