= Yulieski González =

Cuban baseball player (born 1980)

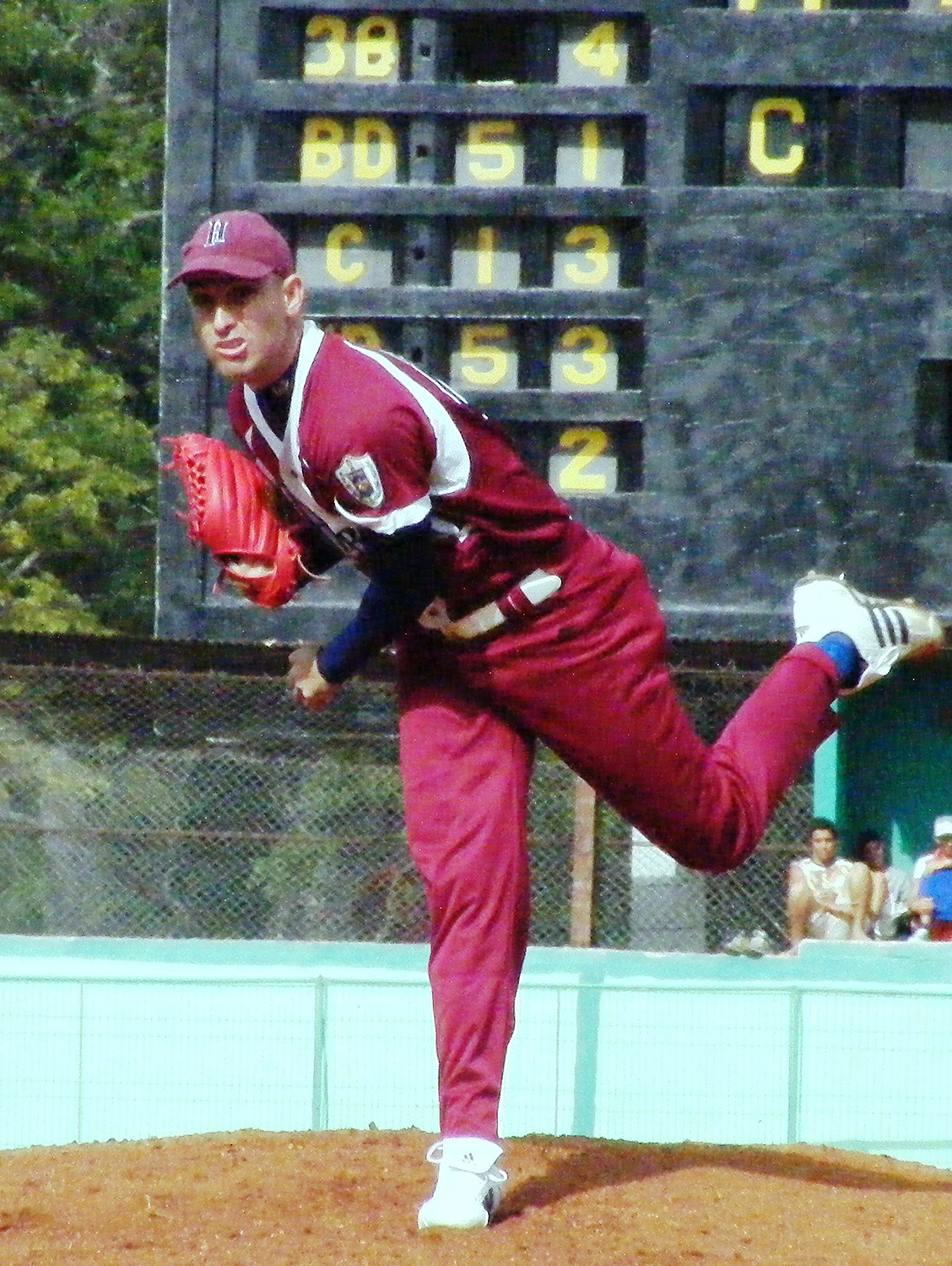
- Pitcher
- Born: 20 June 1980 (age 46); Alquízar, Havana Province, Cuba
- Bats: Left Throws: Left
Medals
Men's baseball
Representing Cuba
World Baseball Classic
Silver medal – second place	2006 San Diego	Team
Baseball World Cup
Gold medal – first place	2005 Rotterdam	Team
Silver medal – second place	2009 Nettuno	Team
Intercontinental Cup
Gold medal – first place	2006 Taipei	Team
Gold medal – first place	2010 Taichung	Team
Pan American Games
Bronze medal – third place	2011 Guadalajara	Team
Central American and Caribbean Games
Gold medal – first place	2006 Cartagena	Team

Yulieski González Ledesma (born 20 June 1980) is a pitcher for the Cuba national baseball team and Habana of the Cuban National Series.

== Career ==
González played for Cuba at the 2006 World Baseball Classic, where he was 3–0 with a 1.62 ERA.

He also represented Cuba at the 2007 World Port Tournament, where he earned the save in Cuba's 2–0 championship game victory over Chinese Taipei.

Gonzalez also represented Cuba in the 2009 World Baseball Classic.

His club, La Habana, achieved the Cuban championship for the first time in the 2008–09 edition, supported by its pitching staff, conformed by some other great Cuban pitchers such as Yadier Pedroso, Miguel Lahera, Jonder Martinez and Miguel Alfredo Gonzalez.
