= Yiddi Cappe =

Cuban baseball player (born 2002)

Lincoln Saltdogs
- Infielder
- Born: September 17, 2002 (age 24); Havana, Cuba
- Bats: Right Throws: Right

Yiddi Lazaro Cappe (born September 17, 2002) is a Cuban professional baseball infielder for the Lincoln Saltdogs of the American Association of Professional Baseball.

== Career ==
=== Miami Marlins ===
Cappe defected from Cuba in 2018 and signed with the Miami Marlins as an international free agent on January 15, 2021. He made his professional debut that year with the Dominican Summer League Marlins.

Cappe played 2022 with the Florida Complex League Marlins and Jupiter Hammerheads and started 2023 with the Beloit Sky Carp. He was released on March 27, 2026.

=== Lincoln Saltdogs ===
On November 6, 2026, Cappe signed with the Lincoln Saltdogs of the American Association of Professional Baseball.
