= Yoandy Garlobo =

Cuban baseball player (1977–2023)

- Designated Hitter
- Born: 12 January 1977; Jovellanos, Matanzas Province, Cuba
- Died: 16 July 2023 (aged 46); Matanzas, Cuba
- Batted: Right Threw: Right

Teams
- Matanzas (1996–2014)

Career highlights and awards
- All-World Baseball Classic Team (2006)
Medals
Men's baseball
Representing Cuba
World Baseball Classic
Silver medal – second place	2006 San Diego	Team
Intercontinental Cup
Gold medal – first place	2006 Taichung	Team
Central American and Caribbean Games
Gold medal – first place	2006 Cartagena	Team

Yoandy Garlobo Romay (12 January 1977 – 16 July 2023) was a Cuban baseball player who starred for the national team at the 2006 World Baseball Classic. Garlobo was the designated hitter for Cuba at the tournament, where he had a .480 batting average—second only to Ken Griffey Jr. among players with at least 20 plate appearances—and was named to the all-tournament team.

Garlobo was born on 12 January 1977 in Jovellanos, Matanzas Province. He made his debut in the Cuban National Series in 1996, appearing in 25 games, recording a .190/.190/.286 hitting line. He mainly played as designated hitter. During the 2005-06 season, he had a .407 batting average.

Yoandy Garlobo died from complications of diabetes on 16 July 2023, at the age of 46.
