= Vladimir Baños =

Cuban baseball player

Vegueros de Pinar del Río
- Pitcher
- Born: January 17, 1983 (age 43); Pinar del Rio, Cuba
- Bats: Right Throws: Right
- Stats at Baseball Reference
Medals
Men's baseball
Representing Cuba
Central American and Caribbean Games
Silver medal – second place	2018 Barranquilla	Team

Vladimir Baños Chacón (born January 17, 1983) is a Cuban professional baseball pitcher with the Padule Baseball Club of the Italian Baseball League.

Baños played for the Cuba national baseball team at the 2006 Intercontinental Cup, 2007 World Port Tournament, 2007 Baseball World Cup, 2013 World Port Tournament and 2017 World Baseball Classic.

On January 24, 2018, Baños signed with the Padule Baseball Club of the Italian Baseball League for the 2018 season.
