= Lázaro Blanco (baseball) =

Cuban baseball player (born 1986)

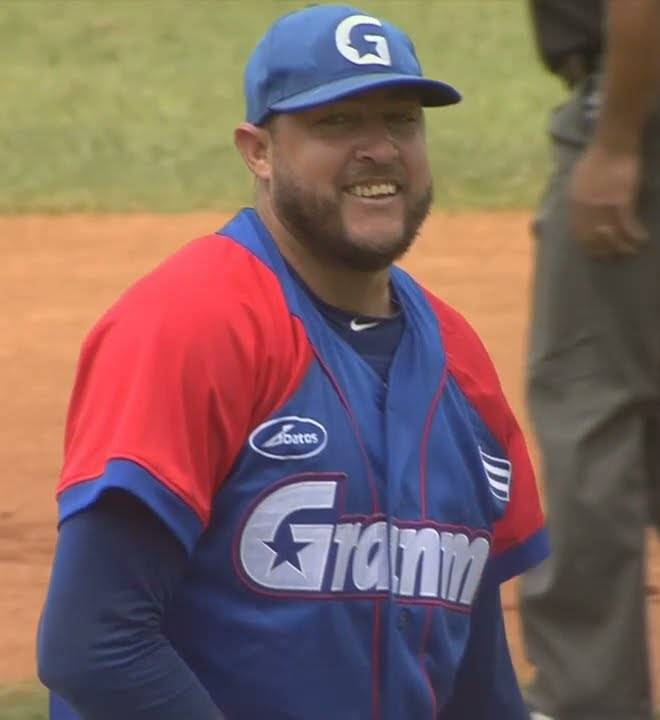
- Blanco in 2021

Bravos de León
- Pitcher / Coach
- Born: February 23, 1986 (age 40); Yara, Cuba
- Bats: Right Throws: Right
- Stats at Baseball Reference
Medals
Men's baseball
Representing Cuba
Central American and Caribbean Games
Silver medal – second place	2018 Barranquilla	Team

Lázaro Blanco Matos (born February 23, 1986) is a Cuban former professional baseball pitcher and currently serves as the bullpen coach for the Bravos de León of the Mexican League. He has previously played for the Alazanes de Granma of the Cuban National Series.

Blanco played for the Cuba national baseball team at the 2015 Pan American Games and 2017 World Baseball Classic.

== Career ==
=== Québec Capitales ===
Blanco signed with the Québec Capitales of the Can-Am League on May 20, 2017. He re-signed with the club for the 2018 season, and was later waived prior to the 2019 season.

Blanco signed with the Saraperos de Saltillo of the Mexican League for the 2020 season. Blanco did not play in a game in 2020 due to the cancellation of the Mexican League season because of the COVID-19 pandemic. In 2021, Blanco pitched for the Cuba national baseball team at the 2020 Summer Olympics Americas Qualifier in Florida. Following the event, he was set to fly to Mexico to join the Saraperos de Saltillo, but missed his flight and announced that he would defect to the United States.

On November 29, 2022, while playing for the Estrellas Orientales in the Dominican Winter League, Blanco was struck in the face by a comebacker off the bat of Gigantes del Cibao hitter Henry Urrutia. Blanco suffered multiple facial fractures and was forced to miss the remainder of the season. He had posted an 0–1 record and 5.40 ERA across 5 appearances (3 of them starts).

=== Bravos de León ===
On January 20, 2023, Blanco signed with the Bravos de León of the Mexican League. He would go on to post a 1–3 record and 4.42 ERA across 14 appearances, all of which were starts.

After the season, he signed with the Venados de Mazatlan of the Mexican Pacific League. He was released by the Venados on December 15, but quickly signed with the Leones del Caracas of the Venezuelan Winter League.

On February 1, 2024, Blanco was released by León. However, on April 10, Blanco re–signed with the club. In nine appearances, he posted a 3–4 record with a 7.02 ERA and 29 strikeouts over 41 innings. On July 1, Blanco was waived by León.

=== El Águila de Veracruz ===
On July 5, 2024, Blanco was claimed off waivers by El Águila de Veracruz of the Mexican League. In 5 games (3 starts) for the team, he posted a 2–1 record and 5.12 ERA with 14 strikeouts across 19 1/3 innings pitched. On December 2, Blanco was released by Veracruz.
