= Barry Armitage =

South African baseball player (born 1979)

- Pitcher
- Born: 11 May 1979 (age 46); Durban, South Africa
- Bats: Right Throws: Right
- Stats at Baseball Reference

Barry Peter Armitage (born 11 May 1979) is a South African baseball pitcher. Armitage was the first South African-born baseball player ever to make an appearance in any Major League Baseball game when he threw an inning for Kansas City Royals against the Houston Astros in a 2005 exhibition game.

== Career ==
Armitage signed with the Royals following a try-out in front of then assistant general manager Allard Baird in 2000. He made his professional debut later that year with the Gulf Coast Royals of the Gulf Coast League in the United States. Armitage left the Royals farm system following two seasons with the Wichita Wranglers of the AA Texas League. Armitage played in 2007 in the Atlantic League with the Newark Bears and Lancaster Barnstormers. Armitage did not play professionally in 2008.

== International career ==
Armitage has played with the South Africa national baseball team in various tournaments throughout his career. He played in the World Baseball Classic in 2006 and 2009.

== Personal ==
Barry Armitage married Jen Dishner on 18 March 2017 in Scottsdale, Arizona. They reside in Cave Creek, Arizona with their two dogs, Simba and Khaya.
