= Carlos Tabares =

Cuban baseball player

Medal record

Men's baseball

Representing Cuba

World Baseball Classic
Silver medal – second place	2006 San Diego	Team

Olympic Games
Gold medal – first place	2004 Athens	Team

Baseball World Cup
Gold medal – first place	1998 Rome	Team
Gold medal – first place	2003 Havana	Team
Gold medal – first place	2005 Rotterdam	Team

Pan American Games
Gold medal – first place	2003 Santo Domingo	Team

Central American and Caribbean Games
Gold medal – first place	1998 Maracaibo	Team

Carlos Alberto Tabares Padilla (born July 8, 1974, in Habana Vieja) is a center fielder for Industriales of the Cuban National Series. He has also been a frequent member of the Cuban national baseball team, including appearances at the 2006 World Baseball Classic and the 2004 Summer Olympics.

Tabares batted .314 during the 2005-06 Cuban National Series, with nine home runs in the 90-game season.
