= Lo Ching-lung =

Taiwanese baseball player

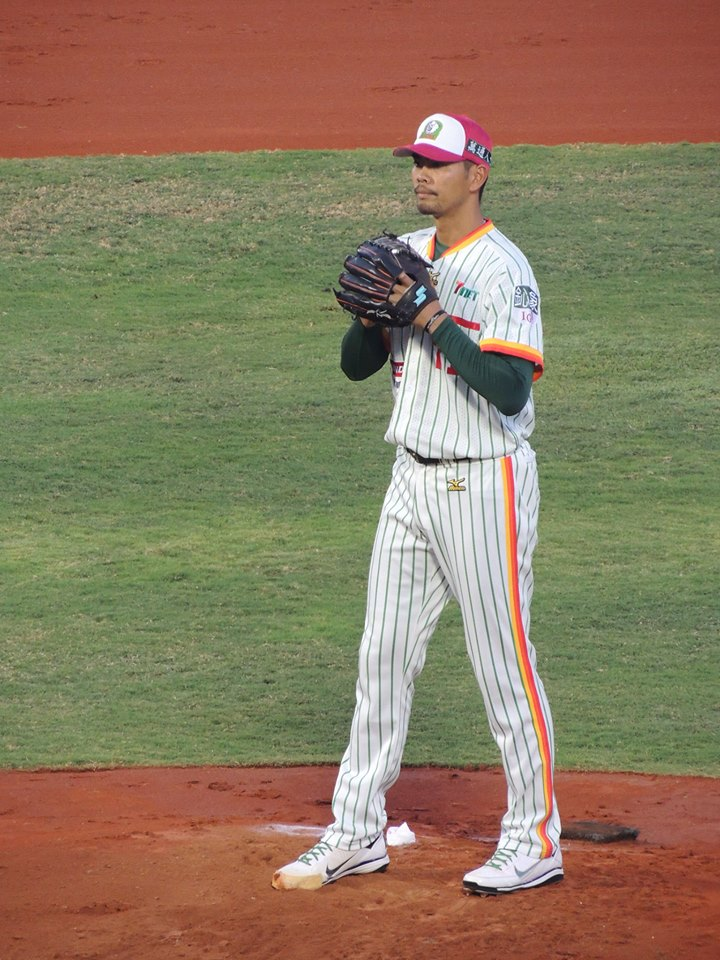

Uni-President Lions – No. 71
- Pitcher / Coach
- Born: 20 August 1985 (age 40); Cishan, Kaohsiung, Taiwan
- Bats: Right Throws: Right

CPBL debut
- March 24, 2013, for the Uni-President 7-Eleven Lions
- Stats at Baseball Reference

Teams
- Uni-President 7-Eleven Lions (2013–2014, 2017, 2019)

Lo Ching-lung (Chinese: 羅錦龍; born 20 August 1985) is a Taiwanese baseball player who most recently played with the Uni-President Lions of the Chinese Professional Baseball League.

== Career ==
Lo was signed out of high school by the Colorado Rockies for $1.4 million. He debuted as a professional in 2002 with the Casper Rockies, going 5–5 with a 4.95 ERA and .290 opponent average as the young man on the staff. Baseball America rated him as the number 13 prospect in the Pioneer League, between Jonathan Broxton and Ubaldo Jiménez among pitchers. They also ranked him as the number 14 Colorado prospect entering 2003.

In 2003, the teenager had a 3–7, 2.85 record for the Tri-City Dust Devils. He tied for the Northwest League in losses but much of that came from poor run support as his club only scored 9 runs in his 7 defeats. He was 10th in the Northwest League in ERA. Baseball America ranked him as the 10th-best Northwest League prospect.

Lo had a 4–3, 5.05 record for the 2004 Asheville Tourists. In 2005, the Tainan native returned to Asheville, where he was 7–9 with a 5.65 ERA and surrendered 23 gopher balls, the most in the South Atlantic League.

Ching-Lung improved his record to 10–5 in 2006 with the Modesto Nuts but his ERA remained elevated at 5.39. He spent 2006 in the Hawaii Winter League, going 4–3 with a 4.97 ERA for the Waikiki BeachBoys. He led the staff in wins but his ERA was fourth-highest among the five starters. It was an international rotation, featuring Dutch hurler Rick van den Hurk, Japan's Atsushi Nohmi, Mexican Marco Estrada, Taiwan's Lo and an American in the fifth slot.

Lo moved up to AA in 2007 and had an 8–8, 5.61 record for the Tulsa Drillers. He allowed a .300 average. His fastball, once timed at 95 mph, was down to the 88–90 range. He was 0–2 with a 6.75 ERA for the Peoria Javelinas in the Arizona Fall League. He was the fourth Taiwan native to play in the AFL, following Chin-Feng Chen, Chin-lung Hu and Yung-Chi Chen.

In 2008, he was again 8-8 for Tulsa, this time with a 5.25 ERA. One positive was his first career shutout.

== International career ==
He represented Chinese Taipei national baseball team at the 2013 World Baseball Classic.
