= Alexeis Bell =

Cuban professional baseball outfielder

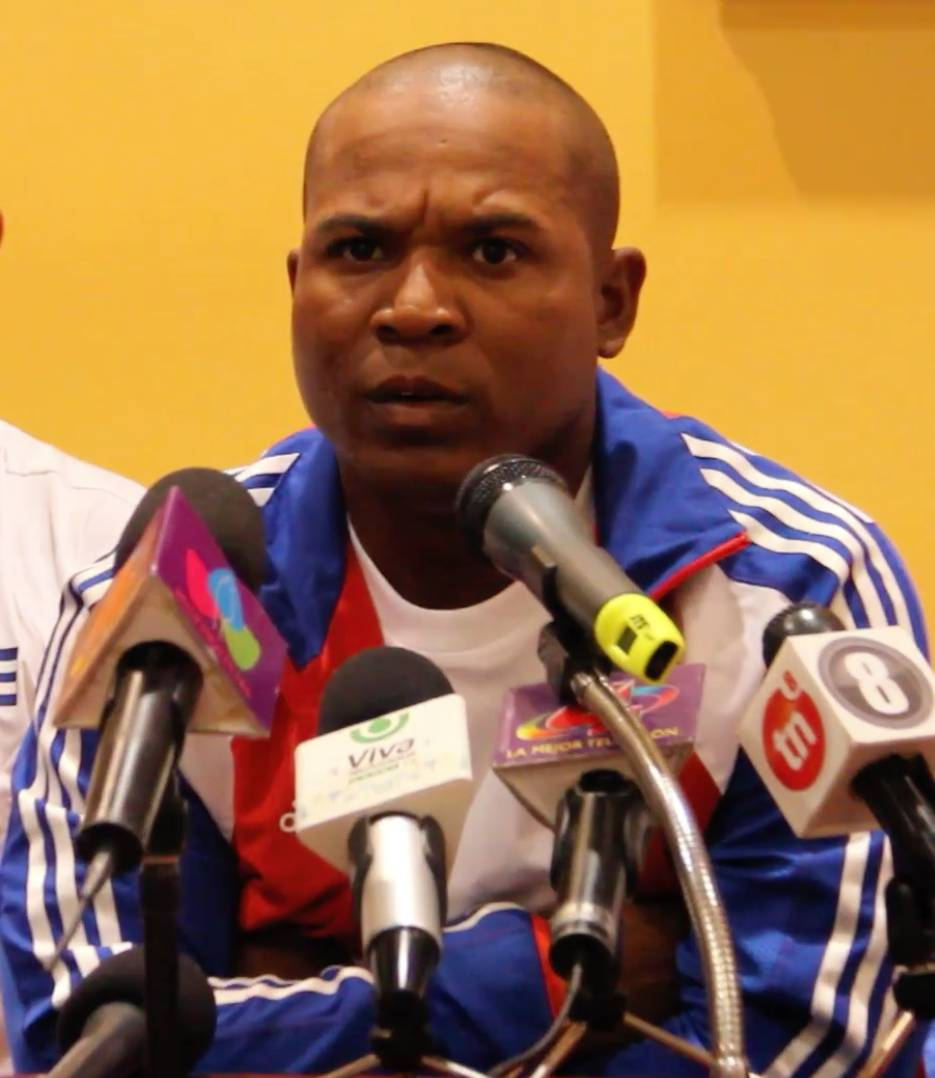
- Bell in 2012
- Outfielder
- Born: October 2, 1983 (age 43); El Caney, Santiago de Cuba Province, Cuba
- Bats: Right Throws: Right
- Stats at Baseball Reference
Medals
Men's baseball
Representing Cuba
Summer Olympics
Silver medal – second place	2008 Beijing	Team
Intercontinental Cup
Gold medal – first place	2010 Taichung	Team
Pan American Games
Bronze medal – third place	2011 Guadalajara	Team
Central American and Caribbean Games
Gold medal – first place	2014 Veracruz	Team

Alexeis Bell Quintero (born October 2, 1983), is a Cuban professional baseball outfielder.

== Career ==
=== Cuban National Series ===
In 3005 in the Cuban National Series, Bell hit for 31 home runs and drove in 111 RBIs in only 90 games in the regular season. In addition, he totaled a league-record 50 bases and had the only 25–25 season in the history of Cuban baseball (stealing 25 bases and hitting more than 25 home runs). That year, Bell also led the Cuban league in runs (96) and slugging percentage (.722). In the playoffs, he hit 5 more home runs and, along with his teammate Rolando Meriño, led the offensive of Santiago de Cuba to a win in the Cuban League Championship in 2008. That season he became the first National Series player to hit 30 home runs and drive in 100 runs.

=== Later career ===
Since 2015, Bell has played professionally in North America. In 2015, he played for Quebec in the Can-Am League. He began 2016 with the Tigres de Quintana Roo of the Mexican League.

On July 6, 2016, Bell signed a minor league contract with the Texas Rangers organization. In 31 games split between the rookie–level Arizona League Rangers and Double–A Frisco RoughRiders, he hit a combined .261/.325/.387 with one home run and 10 RBI. Bell elected free agency following the season on November 7.

== International career ==
He was selected the Cuba national baseball team at the 2008 Summer Olympics, 2012 exhibition games against Chinese Taipei and CPBL All-Stars, 2012 exhibition games against Japan, 2013 World Baseball Classic and 2014 Central American and Caribbean Games.

He was part of the Cuban team which won a silver medal at the 2008 Summer Olympics. In that tournament, he earned the batting crown, had the most extra-base hits and led in slugging percentage (.920).

He also won with the Cuban national team the gold medal at the 2014 Central American and Caribbean Games in Veracruz, Mexico.
