= Rich Thompson (pitcher, born 1984) =

Australian baseball player

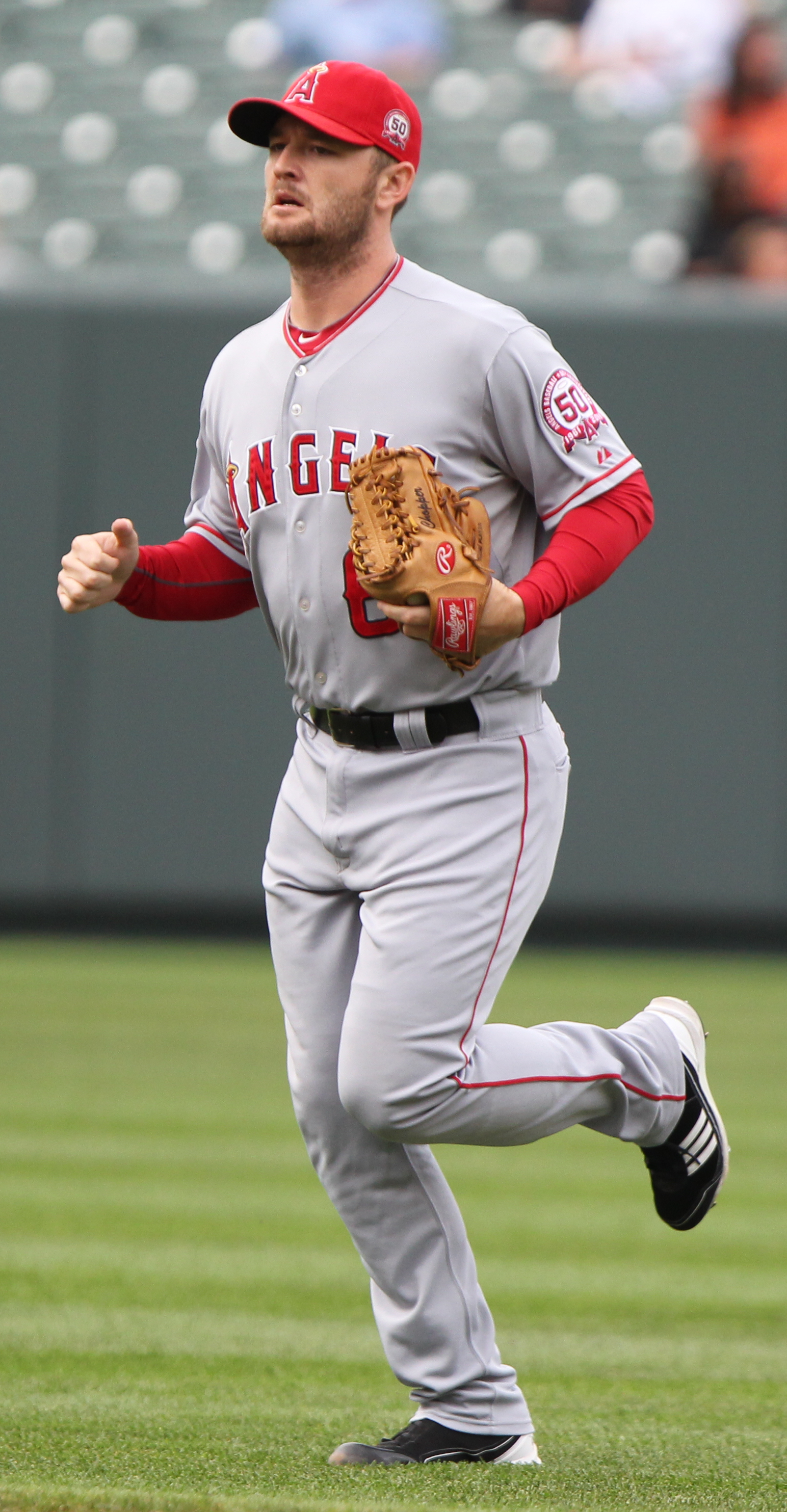
- Thompson with the Los Angeles Angles of Anaheim
- Relief pitcher
- Born: 1 July 1984 (age 42); Hornsby, New South Wales, Australia
- Batted: Right Threw: Right

MLB debut
- 1 September, 2007, for the Los Angeles Angels of Anaheim

Last MLB appearance
- 23 April, 2012, for the Oakland Athletics

MLB statistics
- Win–loss record: 3–4
- Earned run average: 4.21
- Strikeouts: 105
- Stats at Baseball Reference

Teams
- Los Angeles Angels of Anaheim (2007–2012); Oakland Athletics (2012)

Olympic medal record

Men's baseball
Silver medal – second place	Athens 2004	Team competition

Richard Graeme Thompson (born 1 July 1984) is an Australian former professional baseball relief pitcher. He played in Major League Baseball (MLB) for the Los Angeles Angels of Anaheim and Oakland Athletics from 2007 to 2012.

== Playing career ==
=== Los Angeles Angels of Anaheim ===
Thompson was originally signed as an undrafted free agent by the Anaheim Angels on 13 February 2002.

In 2004, Thompson was part of the Australian Olympic baseball team, which achieved a silver medal at the Athens Olympics.

Thompson had his contract purchased by the Angels' major league club on 1 September 2007, marking the first time he was on a major league roster. He made his major league debut on that same day against the Texas Rangers. Thompson made seven appearances for Los Angeles during his rookie campaign, recording a 10.80 ERA with nine strikeouts across 6 2/3 innings pitched.

In 2008, Thompson began the season with the Angels after relievers Chris Bootcheck and Scot Shields began the season on the disabled list. However, after allowing five earned runs on four hits in his only outing against the Texas Rangers, Thompson was optioned to the Triple-A Salt Lake Bees to make way for Shields. He made one more appearance with the Angels, but became hurt pitching in Memphis for Salt Lake. He spent the majority of his 2008 season rehabbing his shoulder injury in Arizona and finished the season with the Bees.

Thompson returned to action in 2009, logging 13 relief appearances for the Angels; in those outings, he recorded a 5.12 ERA with 21 strikeouts across 19 1/3 innings pitched. On 10 September 2010 Thompson picked up his first major league win after the Angels went into extra innings against the Seattle Mariners. He made another 13 appearances for Los Angeles during the 2010 season, compiling a 2–0 record and 1.37 ERA with 15 strikeouts across 19 2/3 innings pitched.

Thompson made his only Australian Baseball League appearances in the 2010–11 season pitching in three games for his native Sydney Blue Sox. Thompson made 44 appearances out of the bullpen for the Angels in 2011, compiling a 1–3 record and 3.00 ERA with 56 strikeouts over 54 innings of work.

Thompson made two appearances for Los Angeles during the 2012 season, but struggled to an 0–1 record and 15.43 ERA with three strikeouts over 2 1/3 innings pitched. On 14 April 2012, Thompson was designated for assignment by the Angels following the acquisition of Brad Mills.

=== Oakland Athletics ===
On 20 April 2012, Thompson was claimed off of waivers by the Oakland Athletics. He made one scoreless appearance for Oakland, logging 2/3 of an inning during a 23 April against the Chicago White Sox. Thompson was designated for assignment by the Athletics on 25 April. Two days later, he cleared waivers and was sent outright to the Triple–A Sacramento River Cats.

=== Toronto Blue Jays ===
On 11 December 2012, the Toronto Blue Jays announced that Thompson had been signed to a minor league contract with an invitation to major league spring training.

== Coaching career ==
On 20 January 2026, Thompson was announced as the manager for the Arkansas Travelers, the Double-A affiliate of the Seattle Mariners.
