= Yasmany Tomás =

Cuban baseball player (born 1990)

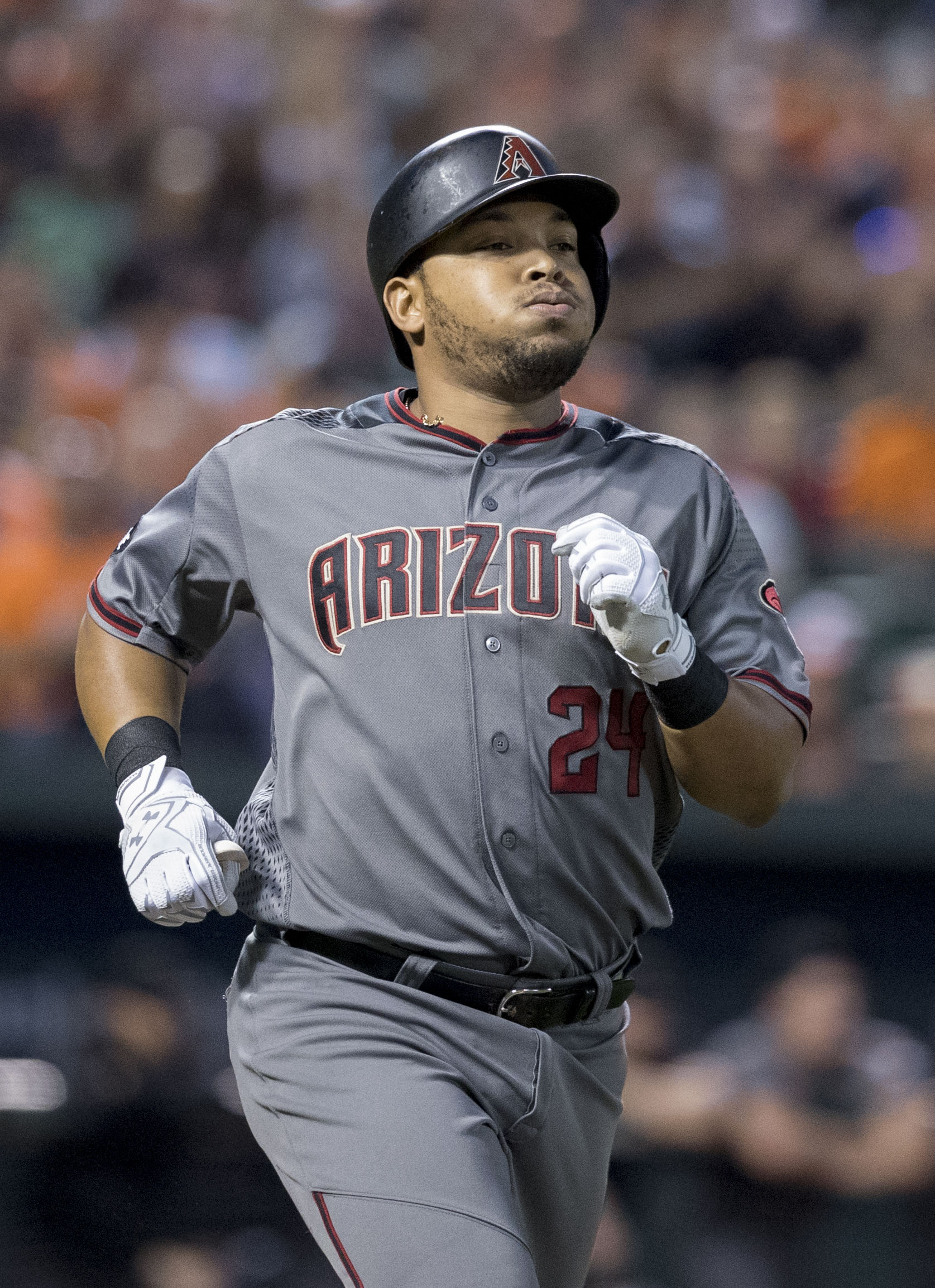
- Tomás with the Arizona Diamondbacks
- Outfielder / Third baseman
- Born: November 14, 1990 (age 35); Havana, Cuba
- Batted: Right Threw: Right

MLB debut
- April 15, 2015, for the Arizona Diamondbacks

Last MLB appearance
- July 30, 2019, for the Arizona Diamondbacks

MLB statistics
- Batting average: .266
- Home runs: 48
- Runs batted in: 163
- Stats at Baseball Reference

Teams
- Arizona Diamondbacks (2015–2017, 2019)
Medals
Men's baseball
Representing Cuba
World Port Tournament
Gold medal – first place	2013 Rotterdam	Team

Yasmany Tomás Bacallao (born November 14, 1990) is a Cuban former professional baseball outfielder. He played for the Cuba national baseball team at the 2013 World Baseball Classic. He played for the Industriales in the Cuban National Series from 2008 through 2013, and in Major League Baseball (MLB) for the Arizona Diamondbacks.

== Professional career ==
=== Cuban career ===
Tomás began his professional career in his home country, Cuba, where he played for the Industriales de La Habana in the Cuban National Series His first professional year of baseball was in 2008 where he played 35 games batting .297 with a home run, four stolen bases, and 11 RBI. In 2009, Tomás played 22 games batting .192 with a home run and three RBIs. After no participation in 2010, Tomás gained playing time in 2011 where he played 69 games batting .301 with 16 home runs, four stolen bases, and 42 RBI. In 2012, Tomás played 81 games batting .289 with 18 home runs, three triples, and 60 RBI. In 2013, he played 65 games batting .290 with six home runs, six stolen bases, and 35 RBI. In 2014, Tomás defected from Cuba in an effort to play in Major League Baseball. At this point in his career, his first name was most often spelled Yasmani.

=== Arizona Diamondbacks ===
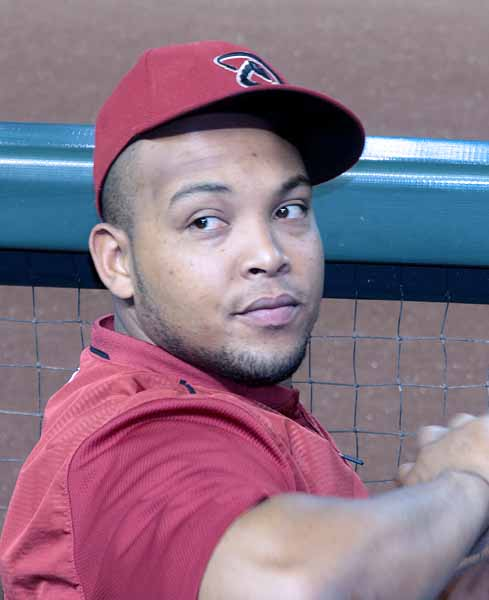
Yasmany Tomas

On November 26, 2014, Tomás agreed to a six-year, $68.5 million contract with the Arizona Diamondbacks. The deal became official on December 8.

On April 4, 2015, Tomás was optioned to the Triple-A Reno Aces to begin the year. He was called up to the majors on April 15 and made his MLB debut that day, grounding out in his lone at-bat. Tomás made his first start at third base on April 22 when Jake Lamb was placed on the 15-day disabled list. He recorded his first career RBI on April 28. On May 17, Tomás hit his first career home run off of Philadelphia Phillies reliever Ken Giles. Tomás finished his rookie campaign with a .273/.305/.401 slash line with nine home runs and 48 RBI across 118 appearances.

In 2016, Tomás played in 140 games for the Diamondbacks, batting .272/.313/.508 with 30 doubles, 31 home runs, and 83 RBI. He made 47 appearances for Arizona in 2017, slashing .241/.294/.464 with eight home runs and 32 RBI. On August 21, 2017, it was announced that Tomás would undergo core surgery, ending his season prematurely.

On March 25, 2018, Tomás was optioned to Triple-A Reno, where he spent the entire year; in 106 appearances for the Aces, he batted .262/.280/.465 with 14 home runs and 65 RBI.

On March 31, 2019, Tomás was placed on outright waivers by the Diamondbacks; two days later, he cleared waivers and was assigned to Reno after being removed from the 40-man roster. On May 20, while in Triple-A, Tomás hit four home runs in a single game as the Aces beat the Tacoma Rainiers 25–8. On July 26, the Diamondbacks selected Tomás' contract, adding him back to their active roster. In four appearances for the Diamondbacks, he went 0-for-6 in six at-bats. On August 4, Tomás was removed from the 40-man roster and sent outright to Reno.

Tomás did not play in a game in 2020 due to the cancellation of the minor league season because of the COVID-19 pandemic. On October 28, 2020, he was one of 147 players declared free agents following the conclusion of the 2020 Major League Baseball season.

=== Washington Nationals ===
On November 17, 2020, Tomás signed a minor league contract with the Washington Nationals organization. On March 27, 2021, Tomas was released by the Nationals. On March 29, Tomas re-signed with the Nationals on a new minor league contract. In 26 appearances for the Triple-A Rochester Red Wings, he batted .185/.292/.370 with three home runs and 12 RBI. Tomás was released following the season on November 11.

== Personal life ==
In January 2018, Tomás was arrested for criminal speeding when he was allegedly driving 105 miles per hour (169 km/h) on Arizona State Route 101.

== See also ==
- List of baseball players who defected from Cuba
