= Miguel Lahera =

Cuban baseball player (born 1985)

Kitchener Panthers
- Pitcher
- Born: January 24, 1985 (age 41); Artemisa Province, Cuba
- Bats: Right Throws: Right
- Stats at Baseball Reference
Medals
Men's baseball
Representing Cuba
Summer Olympics
Silver medal – second place	2008 Beijing	Team
Pan American Games
Bronze medal – third place	2011 Guadalajara	Team

Miguel Lahera Betancourt (born January 24, 1985) is a Cuban baseball player who is currently a free agent. He was part of the Cuba national baseball team that brought home a silver medal from the 2008 Summer Olympics, and also competed for the Cuba national baseball team in the 2008 Haarlem Baseball Week, 2009 World Port Tournament, 2009 World Baseball Classic, 2011 Pan American Games and 2017 World Baseball Classic.
