= Ismel Jiménez =

Cuban baseball player (born 1986)

Gallos de Sancti Spíritus
- Pitcher
- Born: February 10, 1986 (age 40); Trinidad, Sancti Spíritus Province, Cuba
- Bats: Right Throws: Right
- Stats at Baseball Reference

Ismel Jiménez Santiago (born February 10, 1986) is a Cuban baseball pitcher. He plays for Sancti Spíritus of the Cuban National Series.

== Career ==
Jiménez has pitched for the Cuba national baseball team in the 2009 World Baseball Classic (WBC), 2011 Pan American Games, 2013 World Port Tournament, 2013 WBC, and 2015 Pan American Games.

In 2015, Jiménez played for the Québec Capitales for the Canadian American Association of Professional Baseball.
