= Ariel Pestano =

Cuban baseball player (born 1974)

- Catcher
- Born: 31 January 1974 (age 52); Caibarién, Las Villas, Cuba
- Batted: Right Threw: Right

Cuba debut
- 1991, for the Naranjas de Villa Clara

Last Cuba appearance
- 2014, for the Naranjas de Villa Clara

Cuba statistics
- Batting average: .292
- Hits: 1,262
- Home runs: 126
- Runs batted in: 753

Teams
- Naranjas de Villa Clara (1992–2016)
Medals
Men's baseball
Representing Cuba
World Baseball Classic
Silver medal – second place	2006 San Diego	Team
Olympic Games
Gold medal – first place	2004 Athens	Team
Silver medal – second place	2000 Sydney	Team
Silver medal – second place	2008 Beijing	Team
Baseball World Cup
Gold medal – first place	2001 Taipei	Team
Gold medal – first place	2003 Havana	Team
Gold medal – first place	2005 Rotterdam	Team
Silver medal – second place	2007 Taipei	Team
Silver medal – second place	2009 Nettuno	Team
Intercontinental Cup
Silver medal – second place	1999 Sydney	Team
Gold medal – first place	2002 Havana	Team
Gold medal – first place	2006 Taichung	Team
Gold medal – first place	2010 Taichung	Team
Pan American Games
Gold medal – first place	1999 Winnipeg	Team
Gold medal – first place	2003 Santo Domingo	Team
Gold medal – first place	2007 Rio de Janeiro	Team
Bronze medal – third place	2011 Guadalajara	Team
Central American and Caribbean Games
Gold medal – first place	2006 Cartagena	Team

Ariel Osvaldo Pestano Valdés (born 31 January 1974), better known as El Veterano ("The Veteran"), is a Cuban former baseball catcher. He has won both silver and gold medals in the Olympic Games and also played catcher on Cuba's World Baseball Classic team in March 2006 and March 2009. In Cuba, Pestano plays with the Villa Clara Naranjas of the Cuban National Series.

== Personal life ==
Pestano was born on 31 January 1974 in Caibarién, in Las Villas (current Villa Clara Province).

He retired after the 2015–16 Cuban National Series season.
