= List of Major League Baseball players from Cuba =

The following is a list of baseball players from Cuba who have played in Major League Baseball.

== Active players ==
Player	Position	Debut	Team(s)	Birthplace
Raynel Delgado	IF	June 14, 2026	Houston Astros (2026–present)	Havana
Franco Alemán	RHP	May 10, 2026	Cleveland Guardians (2026–present)	Yaguajay
Kendry Rojas	LHP	Aprill 22, 2026	Minnesota Twins (2026–present)	Ciego de Ávila
César Prieto	IF	August 29, 2025	St. Louis Cardinals (2025–present)	Cienfuegos
Edgar Quero	C	April 17, 2025	Chicago White Sox (2025–present)	Cienfuegos
Orlando Ribalta	RHP	August 13, 2024	Washington Nationals (2024–present)	Santa Clara
Yosver Zulueta	RHP	June 25, 2024	Cincinnati Reds (2024–present)	Remedios
Bryan Ramos	3B	May 4, 2024	Chicago White Sox (2024–present)	Havana
Andy Pages	OF	April 16, 2024	Los Angeles Dodgers (2024–present)	Mantua
Yariel Rodríguez	RHP	April 13, 2024	Toronto Blue Jays (2024–present)	Camagüey
Miguel Vargas	3B/1B	August 3, 2022	Los Angeles Dodgers (2022–2024); Chicago White Sox (2024–present)	Havana
Yennier Canó	RHP	May 12, 2022	Minnesota Twins (2022); Baltimore Orioles (2022–present)	Ciego de Ávila
Andy Ibáñez	IF	May 4, 2021	Texas Rangers (2021–2022); Detroit Tigers (2023–present)	Havana
Johan Oviedo	RHP	August 19, 2020	St. Louis Cardinals (2020–2022); Pittsburgh Pirates (2022–2023, 2025–present)	Havana
Luis Robert Jr.	CF	July 24, 2020	Chicago White Sox (2020–present)	Ciego de Ávila
Randy Arozarena	LF	August 14, 2019	St. Louis Cardinals (2019); Tampa Bay Rays (2020–2024); Seattle Mariners (2024–present)	Mantua
Adrián Morejón	LHP	July 21, 2019	San Diego Padres (2019–present)	Havana
Yordan Alvarez	DH/LF	June 9, 2019	Houston Astros (2019–present)	Las Tunas
Adolis García	OF	August 8, 2018	St. Louis Cardinals (2018); Texas Rangers (2020–present)	Ciego de Ávila
Lourdes Gurriel Jr.	LF	April 20, 2018	Toronto Blue Jays (2018–2022); Arizona Diamondbacks (2023–present)	Sancti Spíritus
Yandy Díaz	1B/DH	April 3, 2017	Cleveland Indians (2017–2018); Tampa Bay Rays (2019–present)	Sagua La Grande
Yoán Moncada	3B	September 2, 2016	Boston Red Sox (2016); Chicago White Sox (2017–2024); Los Angeles Angels (2025–present)	Abreus
Raisel Iglesias	RHP	April 12, 2015	Cincinnati Reds (2015–2020); Los Angeles Angels (2021–2022); Atlanta Braves (2022–present)	Isla de la Juventud
Jorge Soler	OF/DH	August 27, 2014	Chicago Cubs (2014–2016); Kansas City Royals (2017–2021); Atlanta Braves (2021); Miami Marlins (2022–2023); San Francisco Giants (2024); Atlanta Braves (2024); Los Angeles Angels (2025–present)	Havana
Aroldis Chapman	LHP	August 31, 2010	Cincinnati Reds (2010–2015); New York Yankees (2016); Chicago Cubs (2016); New York Yankees (2017–2022); Kansas City Royals (2023); Texas Rangers (2023); Pittsburgh Pirates (2024); Boston Red Sox (2025–present)	Holguín

== B ==
- Danys Báez
- Ed Bauta
- Julio Bécquer
- Esteban (Steve) Bellán (*)
- Yuniesky Betancourt
- Francisley Bueno

== C ==
- Jack Calvo
- Bert Campaneris
- Frank Campos
- Bárbaro Cañizares
- Yennier Cano
- José Canseco
- Ozzie Canseco
- José Cardenal
- Leo Cárdenas
- Paul Casanova
- Alberto Castillo
- Rusney Castillo
- Yoenis Céspedes
- Aroldis Chapman
- Jorge Comellas
- Gerardo Concepción
- Sandalio (Sandy) Consuegra
- José Contreras
- Mike Cuellar
- Bert Cueto
- Manuel (Potato) Cueto

== D ==
- Tommy de la Cruz
- Mike de la Hoz
- Juan Delis
- Odrisamer Despaigne
- Orestes Destrade
- Aledmys Díaz
- Juan Díaz
- Yandy Díaz
- Pedro Dibut
- Lino Donoso

== E ==
- Roenis Elias
- Yunel Escobar
- Bobby Estalella, Sr.
- Oscar Estrada

== F ==
- Humberto (Chico) Fernández
- José Fernández
- Lorenzo (Chico) Fernández
- Osvaldo Fernández
- Ángel Fleitas
- Mike Fornieles
- Tony Fossas
- Tito Fuentes

== G ==
- Bárbaro Garbey
- Adonis Garcia
- Onelki Garcia
- Ramón García
- Vince Gonzales
- Eusebio González
- Julio González
- Miguel González
- Mike González
- Tony González
- Yasmani Grandal
- Fermín (Mike) Guerra
- Alex Guerrero
- Lourdes Gurriel Jr.
- Yuli Gurriel

== H ==
- Adeiny Hechavarria
- Guillermo Heredia
- Adrián Hernández
- Evelio Hernández
- Jackie Hernández
- Liván Hernández
- Michel Hernández
- Orlando Hernández
- Salvador (Chico) Hernández
- Mike Herrera
- Pancho Herrera
- Yoslan Herrera
- Dalier Hinojosa

== I ==
- José Iglesias
- Raisel Iglesias
- Enrique (Hank) Izquierdo
- Hansel Izquierdo

== L ==
- George Lauzerique
- Raudel Lazo
- Isidoro (Izzy) León
- Marcelino López
- Ramón López
- Adolfo (Dolf) Luque

== M ==
- Héctor Maestri
- Conrado (Connie) Marrero
- Eli Marrero
- Armando Marsans
- Leonys Martín
- Héctor Martínez
- José Martínez
- Marty Martínez
- Rogelio Martínez
- Gabriel (Tony) Martínez
- Yunesky Maya
- Orlando McFarlane
- Román Mejías
- Minervino (Minnie) Mendoza
- Antonio (Tony) Menéndez
- Orestes (Minnie) Miñoso
- Ariel Miranda
- Juan Miranda
- Willy Miranda
- Yoan Moncada
- Aurelio Monteagudo
- René Monteagudo
- Manny Montejo
- Kendrys Morales
- Daniel (Danny) Morejón
- Julio Moreno

== N ==
- Adrian Nieto
- Lázaro (Cholly) Naranjo
- Ray Noble
- Vladimir Núñez

== O ==
- Tony Oliva
- Héctor Olivera
- Tony (Mosquito) Ordeñana
- Rey Ordóñez
- Eddie Oropesa
- Bill Ortega
- Oliverio (Baby) Ortiz
- Roberto Ortiz
- Regino (Reggie) Otero

== P ==
- Rafael Palmeiro
- Emilio Palmero
- Camilo Pascual
- Carlos (Patato) Pascual
- Carlos Paula
- Carlos (Chick) Pedroes
- Brayan Peña
- Orlando Peña
- Cionel Perez
- Tony Pérez
- Leo Posada
- Ariel Prieto
- Yasiel Puig

== R ==
- Alexei Ramírez
- Pedro Ramos
- Roberto (Bobby) Ramos
- Napoleón (Nap) Reyes
- Luis Robert
- Armando Roche
- Eddy Rodríguez
- Freddy Rodríguez
- Héctor Rodríguez
- José Rodríguez
- Octavio (Cookie) Rojas
- Minervino (Minnie) Rojas
- Chico Ruiz

== S ==
- Alex Sánchez
- Israel Sánchez
- Raúl Sánchez
- Amauri Sanit
- Nelson Santovenia
- Diego Seguí
- Alay Soler
- Jorge Soler
- Luis Suárez
- Leo Sutherland

== T ==
- José Tartabull
- Tony Taylor
- Michael Tejera
- Luis Tiant
- Jorge Toca
- Yasmany Tomas
- Gil Torres
- Ricardo Torres
- Oscar Tuero

== U ==
- Santiago (Sandy) Ullrich
- Henry Urrutia

== V ==
- Raúl Valdés
- Rogelio (Roy) Valdés
- Hilario (Sandy) Valdespino
- René Valdez
- José Valdivielso
- Zoilo Versalles
- Dayán Viciedo

== Z ==
- Adrián Zabala
- Oscar Zamora
- José Zardón

* In 1871, Bellán became the first Latin American professional baseball player to play in the United States

== See also ==
- List of baseball players who defected from Cuba
