= 2002 Florida Marlins season =

2002 Florida Marlins
- League: National League
- Division: East
- Ballpark: Pro Player Stadium
- City: Miami Gardens, Florida
- Record: 79–83 (.488)
- Divisional place: 4th
- Owners: Jeffrey Loria
- General managers: Larry Beinfest
- Managers: Jeff Torborg
- Television: FSN Florida; WPXM (Len Kasper, Tommy Hutton)
- Radio: WQAM (Dave Van Horne, Jon Sciambi); WQBA (Spanish) (Felo Ramírez, Ángel Rodríguez)

The 2002 Florida Marlins season was the tenth season for the Major League Baseball (MLB) franchise in the National League. It would begin with the team attempting to improve on their season from 2001. Their manager was Jeff Torborg. They played home games at Pro Player Stadium. They finished with a record of 79–83, fourth in the National League East.

== Offseason ==
- February 18, 2002: Tim Raines signed as a free agent with the Florida Marlins. He was the last batter to wear a flapless helmet, which has been illegal for new batters since the 1983 season.
- March 27, 2002: Dontrelle Willis was traded by the Chicago Cubs with Jose Cueto (minors), Ryan Jorgensen, and Julián Tavárez to the Florida Marlins for Antonio Alfonseca and Matt Clement.

== Regular season ==
=== Season standings ===
==== National League East ====
NL East
Team	W	L	Pct.	GB	Home	Road
Atlanta Braves	101	59	.631	—	52‍–‍28	49‍–‍31
Montreal Expos	83	79	.512	19	49‍–‍32	34‍–‍47
Philadelphia Phillies	80	81	.497	21½	40‍–‍40	40‍–‍41
Florida Marlins	79	83	.488	23	46‍–‍35	33‍–‍48
New York Mets	75	86	.466	26½	38‍–‍43	37‍–‍43

==== Record vs. opponents ====
2002 National League record Source: MLB Standings Grid – 2002
Team	AZ	ATL	CHC	CIN	COL	FLA	HOU	LAD	MIL	MON	NYM	PHI	PIT	SD	SF	STL	AL
Arizona	—	3–3	4–2	6–0	14–5	5–1	3–3	9–10	4–2	4–2	5–2	4–3	4–2	12–7	8–11	2–4	11–7
Atlanta	3–3	—	4–2	4–2	4–3	11–8	3–3	2–4	5–1	13–6	12–7	11–7	3–3	3–3	3–3–1	5–1	15–3
Chicago	2–4	2–4	—	5–12	4–2	4–2	8–11	2–4	7–10	3–3	1–5	2–4	10–9	2–4	3–3	6–12	6–6
Cincinnati	0–6	2–4	12–5	—	3–3	5–1	6–11	4–2	13–6	1–5	2–4	2–4	11–7	5–1	2–4	8–11	2–10
Colorado	5–14	3–4	2–4	3–3	—	5–2	3–3	7–12	3–3	4–2	3–3	3–3	4–2	11–8	8–12	2–4	7–11
Florida	1–5	8–11	2–4	1–5	2–5	—	3–3	3–3	4–2	10–9	8–11	10–9	4–2	5–1	4–3	4–2	10–8
Houston	3–3	3–3	11–8	11–6	3–3	3–3	—	3–3	10–8	3–3	4–2	3–3	11–6	4–2	1–5	6–13	5–7
Los Angeles	10–9	4–2	4–2	2–4	12–7	3–3	3–3	—	5–1	5–2	4–2	4–3	4–2	10–9	8–11	2–4	12–6
Milwaukee	2–4	1–5	10–7	6–13	3–3	2–4	8–10	1–5	—	2–4	1–5	1–5	4–15	5–1	1–5	7–10	2–10
Montreal	2–4	6–13	3–3	5–1	2–4	9–10	3–3	2–5	4–2	—	11–8	11–8	3–3	3–4	4–2	3–3	12–6
New York	2–5	7–12	5–1	4–2	3–3	11–8	2–4	2–4	5–1	8–11	—	9–10	1–4	3–4	0–6	3–3	10–8
Philadelphia	3–4	7–11	4–2	4–2	3–3	9–10	3–3	3–4	5–1	8–11	10–9	—	2–4	2–4	3–3	4–2	10–8
Pittsburgh	2–4	3–3	9–10	7–11	2–4	2–4	6–11	2–4	15–4	3–3	4–1	4–2	—	2–4	2–4	6–11	3–9
San Diego	7–12	3–3	4–2	1–5	8–11	1–5	2–4	9–10	1–5	4–3	4–3	4–2	4–2	—	5–14	1–5	8–10
San Francisco	11–8	3–3–1	3–3	4–2	11–8	3–4	5–1	11–8	5–1	2–4	6–0	3–3	4–2	14–5	—	2–4	8–10
St. Louis	4–2	1–5	12–6	11–8	4–2	2–4	13–6	4–2	10–7	3–3	3–3	2–4	11–6	5–1	4–2	—	8–4

=== Citrus Series ===
The annual interleague games between the Florida Marlins and the Tampa Bay Devil Rays were played in June and July. They are known as the Citrus Series. The Devil Rays won the series 4–2.

Date	Winning Team	Losing Team	Score	Venue
June 14	Devil Rays	Marlins	4-3 (14 innings)	Pro Player Stadium
June 15	Marlins	Devil Rays	3-0	Pro Player Stadium
June 16	Devil Rays	Marlins	4-1	Pro Player Stadium
June 28	Devil Rays	Marlins	4-0	Tropicana Field
June 29	Marlins	Devil Rays	3-2	Tropicana Field
June 30	Devil Rays	Marlins	6-5 (12 innings)	Tropicana Field

=== Notable transactions ===
- June 4, 2002: Jeremy Hermida was drafted by the Florida Marlins in the 1st round (11th pick) of the 2002 amateur draft. Player signed July 5, 2002.
- July 11, 2002: Cliff Floyd was traded by the Florida Marlins with Wilton Guerrero, Claudio Vargas, and cash to the Montreal Expos for a player to be named later, Graeme Lloyd, Mike Mordecai, Carl Pavano, and Justin Wayne. The Montreal Expos sent Donald Levinski (minors) (August 5, 2002) to the Florida Marlins to complete the trade.

=== Roster ===
2002 Florida Marlins
Roster
Pitchers: 55 Armando Almanza; 61 Josh Beckett; 33 Toby Borland; 34 A. J. Burnett; 22 Vic Darensbourg; 46 Ryan Dempster; 62 Hansel Izquierdo; 35 Gary Knotts; 47 Graeme Lloyd; 41 Braden Looper; 45,46 Oswaldo Mairena; 54 Blaine Neal; 27,36 Vladimir Núñez; 56 Kevin Olsen; 45 Carl Pavano; 31 Brad Penny; 32 Nate Robertson; 50 Julián Tavárez; 58 Michael Tejera; 53 Nate Teut; 48 Justin Wayne	Catchers: 17 Ramón Castro; 23 Charles Johnson; 52 Mike Redmond; Infielders: 4 Brian Banks; 8 Homer Bush; 1 Luis Castillo; 6 Andy Fox; 11 Álex González; 25 Derrek Lee; 19 Mike Lowell; 2 Marty Malloy; 12 Mike Mordecai; 3 Pablo Ozuna	Outfielders: 43 Juan Encarnación; 30 Cliff Floyd; 15 Kevin Millar; 27 Abraham Nunez; 16 Eric Owens; 32,30 Tim Raines; 44 Preston Wilson	Manager: 10 Jeff Torborg; Coaches: 38 Brad Arnsberg (pitching); 67 Pierre Arsenault (coach); 47 Jeff Cox (bullpen); 13 Ozzie Guillén (third base); 7 Perry Hill (first base); -- Rick Renick (bench); 28 Bill Robinson (hitting)

== Player stats ==
=== Batting ===
==== Starters by position ====
Note: Pos = Position; G = Games played; AB = At bats; H = Hits; Avg. = Batting average; HR = Home runs; RBI = Runs batted in

Pos	Player	G	AB	H	Avg.	HR	RBI
C	Charles Johnson	83	244	53	.217	6	36
1B	Derrek Lee	162	581	157	.270	27	86
2B	Luis Castillo	146	606	185	.305	2	39
SS	Andy Fox	133	435	109	.251	4	41
3B	Mike Lowell	160	597	165	.276	24	92
LF	Kevin Millar	126	438	134	.306	16	57
CF	Preston Wilson	141	510	124	.243	23	65
RF	Cliff Floyd	84	296	85	.287	18	57

==== Other batters ====
Note: G = Games played; AB = At bats; H = Hits; Avg. = Batting average; HR = Home runs; RBI = Runs batted in

Player	G	AB	H	Avg.	HR	RBI
Eric Owens	131	385	104	.270	4	37
Juan Encarnación	69	263	69	.262	8	34
Mike Redmond	88	256	78	.305	2	28
Álex González	42	151	34	.225	2	18
Ramón Castro	54	101	24	.238	6	18
Tim Raines	98	89	17	.191	1	7
Mike Mordecai	38	77	22	.286	0	7
Homer Bush	40	54	12	.222	0	5
Pablo Ozuna	34	47	13	.277	0	3
Brian Banks	20	28	9	.321	1	4
Marty Malloy	24	25	3	.120	0	1
Abraham Núñez	19	17	2	.118	0	1

=== Pitching ===
==== Starting pitchers ====
Note: G = Games pitched; IP = Innings pitched; W = Wins; L = Losses; ERA = Earned run average; SO = Strikeouts

Player	G	IP	W	L	ERA	SO
A.J. Burnett	31	204.1	12	9	3.30	203
Julián Tavárez	29	153.2	10	12	5.39	67
Brad Penny	24	129.1	8	7	4.66	93
Ryan Dempster	18	120.1	5	8	4.79	87
Josh Beckett	23	107.2	6	7	4.10	113
Justin Wayne	5	23.2	2	3	5.32	16

==== Other pitchers ====
Note: G = Games pitched; IP = Innings pitched; W = Wins; L = Losses; ERA = Earned run average; SO = Strikeouts

Player	G	IP	W	L	ERA	SO
Michael Tejera	47	139.2	8	8	4.45	95
Carl Pavano	22	61.2	3	2	3.79	41
Kevin Olsen	17	55.2	0	5	4.53	38
Nate Robertson	6	8.1	0	1	11.88	3
Nate Teut	2	7.1	0	1	9.82	4

==== Relief pitchers ====
Note: G = Games pitched; W = Wins; L = Losses; SV = Saves; ERA = Earned run average; SO = Strikeouts

Player	G	W	L	SV	ERA	SO
Vladimir Núñez	77	6	5	20	3.41	73
Braden Looper	78	2	5	13	3.14	55
Armando Almanza	51	3	2	2	4.34	57
Vic Darensbourg	42	1	2	0	6.14	33
Blaine Neal	32	3	0	0	2.73	33
Oswaldo Mairena	31	2	3	0	5.35	21
Gary Knotts	28	3	1	0	4.40	21
Graeme Lloyd	25	2	2	0	4.44	20
Hansel Izquierdo	20	2	0	0	4.55	20
Toby Borland	15	1	0	0	5.27	11

== Farm system ==
Level	Team	League	Manager
AAA	Calgary Cannons	Pacific Coast League	Dean Treanor
AA	Portland Sea Dogs	Eastern League	Eric Fox
A	Jupiter Hammerheads	Florida State League	Luis Dorante
A	Kane County Cougars	Midwest League	Steve Phillips
A-Short Season	Jamestown Jammers	New York–Penn League	Johnny Rodriguez
Rookie	GCL Marlins	Gulf Coast League	Jesus Campos
