= Abraham Nunez =

Abraham Nunez may refer to:

- Abraham Núñez (infielder) (born 1976), debuted in 1997 with the Pittsburgh Pirates
- Abraham Núñez (outfielder) (born 1977), debuted in 2002 with the Florida Marlins
