= René Arocha =

Cuban baseball player (born 1964)

- Pitcher
- Born: February 24, 1964 (age 62); Havana, Cuba
- Batted: Right Threw: Right

MLB debut
- April 9, 1993, for the St. Louis Cardinals

Last MLB appearance
- June 6, 1997, for the San Francisco Giants

MLB statistics
- Win–loss record: 18–17
- Earned run average: 4.11
- Strikeouts: 190
- Stats at Baseball Reference

Teams
- St. Louis Cardinals (1993–1995); San Francisco Giants (1997)
Medals
Men's baseball
Representing Cuba
Baseball World Cup
| Gold medal – first place | 1988 Rome | Team |
Central American and Caribbean Games
| Gold medal – first place | 1990 Mexico City | Team |

René Arocha (born February 24, 1964) is a Cuban former professional baseball pitcher. He is generally considered the first Cuban baseball player to openly defect to the United States with the intention of playing for a Major League Baseball (MLB) team. (Note: Rogelio Álvarez and Bárbaro Garbey both defected before Arocha. However, Álvarez had already played in the majors with the Cincinnati Reds before his 1963 defection, while Garbey defected as part of the 1980 Mariel boatlift, rather than on his own.)

== Biography ==
René Arocha studied at the Regla high school in Havana. After graduating high school, Arocha became a member of Cuba's famed national baseball team.

In 1991, during an international competition, Arocha defected, opting for a life in the United States and the chance at playing in the Major Leagues. His story became known across the States when Hispanic media began talking about him, and Arocha was the subject of many television reports on Telemundo and Univision.

In 1991, Arocha was signed by the St. Louis Cardinals, and assigned to the Cardinals' farm team in Louisville, Kentucky. As a pitcher in Louisville in 1992, Arocha posted 12 wins and 7 losses with an earned run average of 2.70. These numbers prompted the Cardinals to bring Arocha to the Major Leagues, and he debuted with the Cardinals in 1993, winning 11 games and losing 8, while striking out 96 opponents and accumulating an ERA of 3.78.

The 1994 and 1995 seasons were marred for Arocha by injuries, and he only won 7 games in those two years combined, while also losing 7. After missing the entire 1996 season with injuries, he was dealt as a player to be named later to the San Francisco Giants in a deal to acquire catcher Tom Lampkin.

Arocha spent much of 1997 with the Giants' Pacific Coast League affiliate, the Phoenix Firebirds. He won 7 games while losing only 3. Arocha returned to the majors with the Giants, pitching ten innings and posting an 11.32 ERA before earning his release on August 6, 1997. The New York Yankees signed him one week later, where he completed the season as a member of their Triple-A affiliate in Columbus.

Arocha finished his professional career with the Houston Astros' Triple-A affiliate in New Orleans in 1998, posting a 5–4 record and a 5.45 ERA in 11 starts.

== See also ==
- List of Cubans
- List of baseball players who defected from Cuba
