= Eddie Oropesa =

Cuban baseball player (born 1971)

- Pitcher
- Born: November 23, 1971 (age 54); Matanzas, Cuba
- Batted: Left Threw: Left

MLB debut
- April 2, 2001, for the Philadelphia Phillies

Last MLB appearance
- May 20, 2004, for the San Diego Padres

CPBL statistics
- Win–loss record: 0–2
- Earned run average: 6.28
- Strikeouts: 6

MLB statistics
- Win–loss record: 8–4
- Earned run average: 7.34
- Strikeouts: 78
- Stats at Baseball Reference

Teams
- Uni-President Lions (1998); Philadelphia Phillies (2001); Arizona Diamondbacks (2002–2003); San Diego Padres (2004)

Edilberto Oropesa (born November 23, 1971) is a Cuban former professional baseball pitcher and coach, who played in Major League Baseball (MLB) for the Philadelphia Phillies (2001), Arizona Diamondbacks (2002–2003), and San Diego Padres (2004).

Oropesa defected from the Cuban national team at the World University Games in Buffalo, New York in 1993, climbing over a fence while the rest of his team was warming up. He was the second active Cuban player (after René Arocha) to defect to the United States. He first played as a professional in the U.S. with the independent St. Paul Saints in 1993. He was then drafted by the Los Angeles Dodgers in the 14th round of the 1994 MLB draft. He was a replacement player for the Dodgers during spring training in 1995 during the ongoing strike. After his playing career, he was hired by the Dodgers to work with newly signed Cuban player Yasiel Puig and had a similar role with Yoan López of the Arizona Diamondbacks. He then coached in the Diamondbacks minor league system from 2016 to 2018.

== Pitching Style ==
Oropesa threw three pitches: a fastball, slider, and changeup. His pitching delivery was unique. Against right-handed hitters, he went from the full windup. He would hide the ball by turning his back to the hitter utilizing a high leg kick and release the ball from a high three-quarters arm angle. Against lefties, he would work exclusively from the stretch, even with no runners on base. Against lefties, he would turn his back slightly however his leg kick was not nearly as exaggerated and he would use a sidearm release point. This delivery made it really tough for lefties to hit him, as they only hit .242 against him in his entire career. However, these inconsistent mechanics often led to control problems.

== Personal life ==
He has two children with his wife Rita.

== See also ==
- List of baseball players who defected from Cuba
