= Deinis Suárez =

Cuban right-handed pitcher (born 1984)

- Pitcher
- Born: March 13, 1984 (age 42); Havana, Cuba
- Bats: Right Throws: Right
- Stats at Baseball Reference
Medals
Men's baseball
Representing Cuba
World Baseball Classic
Silver medal – second place	2006 San Diego	Team
Intercontinental Cup
Gold medal – first place	2006 Taichung	Team
World Junior Baseball Championship
Gold medal – first place	2002 Sherbrooke	Team

Deinis Suárez Laguardia (born March 13, 1984) is a Cuban former professional baseball right-handed pitcher.

Suárez pitched for Industriales of the Cuban National Series and the Cuban national baseball team. He was part of the Cuban roster for the 2006 World Baseball Classic.

Suárez was 8–3 with a 3.55 ERA for Industriales during the 2005-06 season.

Suárez defected from Cuba and signed with the Minnesota Twins in April 2011. He pitched in 2011 for the New Britain Rock Cats of the Class-AA Eastern League and Rochester Red Wings of the Class-AAA International League.

== See also ==
- List of baseball players who defected from Cuba
