= Gerardo Concepción =

Cuban baseball player (born 1992)

- Pitcher
- Born: February 29, 1992 (age 34); Havana, Cuba
- Batted: Left Threw: Left

MLB debut
- June 21, 2016, for the Chicago Cubs

Last MLB appearance
- June 26, 2016, for the Chicago Cubs

MLB statistics
- Win–loss record: 0–0
- Earned run average: 3.86
- Strikeouts: 2
- Stats at Baseball Reference

Teams
- Chicago Cubs (2016)

Gerardo Concepción Pérez (born February 29, 1992) is a Cuban former professional baseball pitcher. After competing in the 2010–11 Cuban National Series, winning the Rookie of the Year Award, he defected to Mexico in order to become an MLB free agent. He pitched in MLB for the Chicago Cubs in 2016.

== Professional career ==
=== Cuba ===
Concepción debuted in the Cuban National Series with the 2010–11 Industriales. In his rookie season, Concepción finished with a 10–3 win–loss record and a 3.36 earned run average (ERA) in 21 games pitched, including 16 games started. He placed among the league leaders in wins (finishing tied for sixth with Yosvani Torres), winning percentage (finishing second, behind Norberto González) and ERA (finishing ninth, between Miguel Alfredo González and Dalier Hinojosa). For his debut season, he was named the Cuban National Series Rookie of the Year.

Concepción defected from Cuba while in Rotterdam, Netherlands, where the Cuban national baseball team was participating in the World Port Tournament in June 2011, the same tournament where Aroldis Chapman defected from Cuba in 2009. Concepción established residency in Mexico and Major League Baseball declared him a free agent in January 2012.

=== Chicago Cubs ===
==== Minor leagues ====
Concepción agreed to sign with the Chicago Cubs on February 2, 2012, pending a physical. The deal, worth $6 million over five years, became official on March 11. The Cubs removed Concepción from the 40-man roster and sent him outright to the Kane County Cougars of the Single-A Midwest League on December 21. The Cubs assigned Concepción to the Arizona Fall League following the 2014 season. He began the 2015 season with the Myrtle Beach Pelicans of the High-A Carolina League. Concepción began the 2016 season with the Tennessee Smokies of the Double-A Southern League, and was promoted to the Iowa Cubs of the Triple-A Pacific Coast League.

==== Major leagues ====
Concepción was promoted to the major leagues for the first time on June 21, 2016. He struck out the first batter he faced in his debut that night. He made three appearances in 2016 with a 3.86 ERA. The Cubs eventually won the 2016 World Series, ending their 108-year drought. Concepción was not present during the playoffs, but was still on the 40-man roster at the time and won his first World Series title. The Cubs non-tendered Concepción on December 2, making him a free agent. He was released by the Cubs organization on May 6, 2017.

== Scouting report ==
During his career Concepción was 6 feet 2 inches (1.88 m) tall and slender. He threw a fastball, which registered in the low 90s (miles per hour), and he also featured a curveball and a change-up. In his pitching motion, he threw across his body, which created deception in his delivery, but would prevent him from being consistent.

== See also ==
- List of baseball players who defected from Cuba

Awards and achievements
Preceded by Yusef Amador	Cuban National Series Rookie of the Year; 2010–11	Succeeded by Carlos Juan Viera
