= Daniel Carbonell =

Cuban baseball player (born 1991)

- Outfielder
- Born: March 29, 1991 (age 35); Camagüey, Cuba
- Bats: Right Throws: Right
- Stats at Baseball Reference

Daniel Carbonell Arredondo is a Cuban former professional baseball outfielder.

== Career ==
Carbonell played for Camagüey in the Cuban National Series for four years. In October 2013, Carbonell and Orlando Pérez defected from Cuba.

=== San Francisco Giants ===
Carbonell signed a four-year, $1.4 million major league contract with the San Francisco Giants on June 16, 2014. He made his professional debut that same season and played in ten games for the Arizona Giants before receiving a promotion to the San Jose Giants. In 31 games between the two teams, he batted .336 with four home runs and 16 RBIs. He spent 2015 with San Jose and the Richmond Flying Squirrels, slashing .220/.261/.319 with seven home runs, 39 RBIs, and 18 stolen bases in 122 games, and 2016 with San Jose where he batted .284 with three home runs and 20 RBIs in 64 games, along with playing in two games for the Sacramento River Cats. Carbonell spent 2017 with both San Jose and Richmond where he compiled a .269 batting average with eight home runs, 47 RBIs, and a .732 OPS in 94 games. He was released from the Giants organization on April 11, 2018.

=== Olmecas de Tabasco ===
On April 25, 2018, Carbonell signed with the Olmecas de Tabasco of the Mexican League. Carbonell made 82 appearances for Tabasco, slashing .324/.384/.493 with 10 home runs, 42 RBI, and 11 stolen bases.

=== Piratas de Campeche ===
On January 23, 2020, Carbonell was traded to the Piratas de Campeche of the Mexican League. Carbonell did not play in a game in 2020 due to the cancellation of the Mexican League season because of the COVID-19 pandemic. In 2021, Carbonell batted .306/.372/.466 with four home runs, 20 RBI, and 13 stolen bases in 56 games. He was released on February 14, 2022.

== See also ==
- List of baseball players who defected from Cuba
