= Amaury Cazana =

Cuban baseball player (born 1976)

Free agent
- Outfielder
- Born: October 19, 1976 (age 49); Matanzas, Cuba
- Bats: Right Throws: Right
- Stats at Baseball Reference

Amaury Cazana
Medal record

Men's baseball

Representing Cuba

Intercontinental Cup
Gold medal – first place	2002 Havana	Team

Amaury Antonio Cazana Marti (born October 19, 1976) is a Cuban professional baseball outfielder who is a free agent.

== Professional career ==
=== St. Louis Cardinals ===
Cazana was drafted by the St. Louis Cardinals in the 18th round of the 2006 Major League Baseball draft.

In five seasons and 541 total games, Cazana hit for a .344 batting average with 70 home runs and 322 runs batted in.

Cazana started the 2012 season with the Triple–A Memphis Redbirds. He was released by the Cardinals organization on May 14, 2012.

=== Mexican League ===
On May 22, 2012, Cazana signed with the Acereros de Monclova of the Mexican League. On March 22, 2013, he was assigned to the Broncos de Reynosa. On June 28, 2013, Cazana was traded to the Rojos del Aguila de Veracruz in exchange for Carlos Rivera and Frank Diaz. He was released on April 4, 2014. On April 24, 2014, Cazana signed with the Toros de Tijuana. On May 13, 2014, Cazana was released. After 4 years out of baseball, Cazana signed with the Tecolotes de los Dos Laredos on July 3, 2018. Cazana did not play in a game in 2020 due to the cancellation of the Mexican League season because of the COVID-19 pandemic. He later became a free agent.

== See also ==
- List of baseball players who defected from Cuba
