= Diosdani Castillo =

Cuban baseball player

- Pitcher
- Born: November 22, 1987 (age 38); Cuba
- Bats: Right Throws: Right
- Stats at Baseball Reference

Diosdani Castillo Vergel (born November 22, 1987), also known as Diosdany Castillo, is a Cuban former baseball pitcher.

Castillo played for the Naranjas de Villa Clara in the Cuban National Series and for the Cuba national baseball team at the 2013 World Baseball Classic. In July 2014, Castillo was kicked off Villa Clara's team for a failed defection attempt in an effort to play in Major League Baseball. He successfully defected from Cuba to Mexico in August. He started the 2016 season with the Tigres de Quintana Roo, but was traded to the Rieleros de Aguascalientes on June 7, 2016. He was released by the Rieleros on June 21, 2016, after two starts.

== See also ==
- List of baseball players who defected from Cuba
