= List of baseball players who defected from Cuba =

This is a list of baseball players who defected from Cuba, consisting of Cuban baseball players who have defected since the beginning of Fidel Castro's presidency.

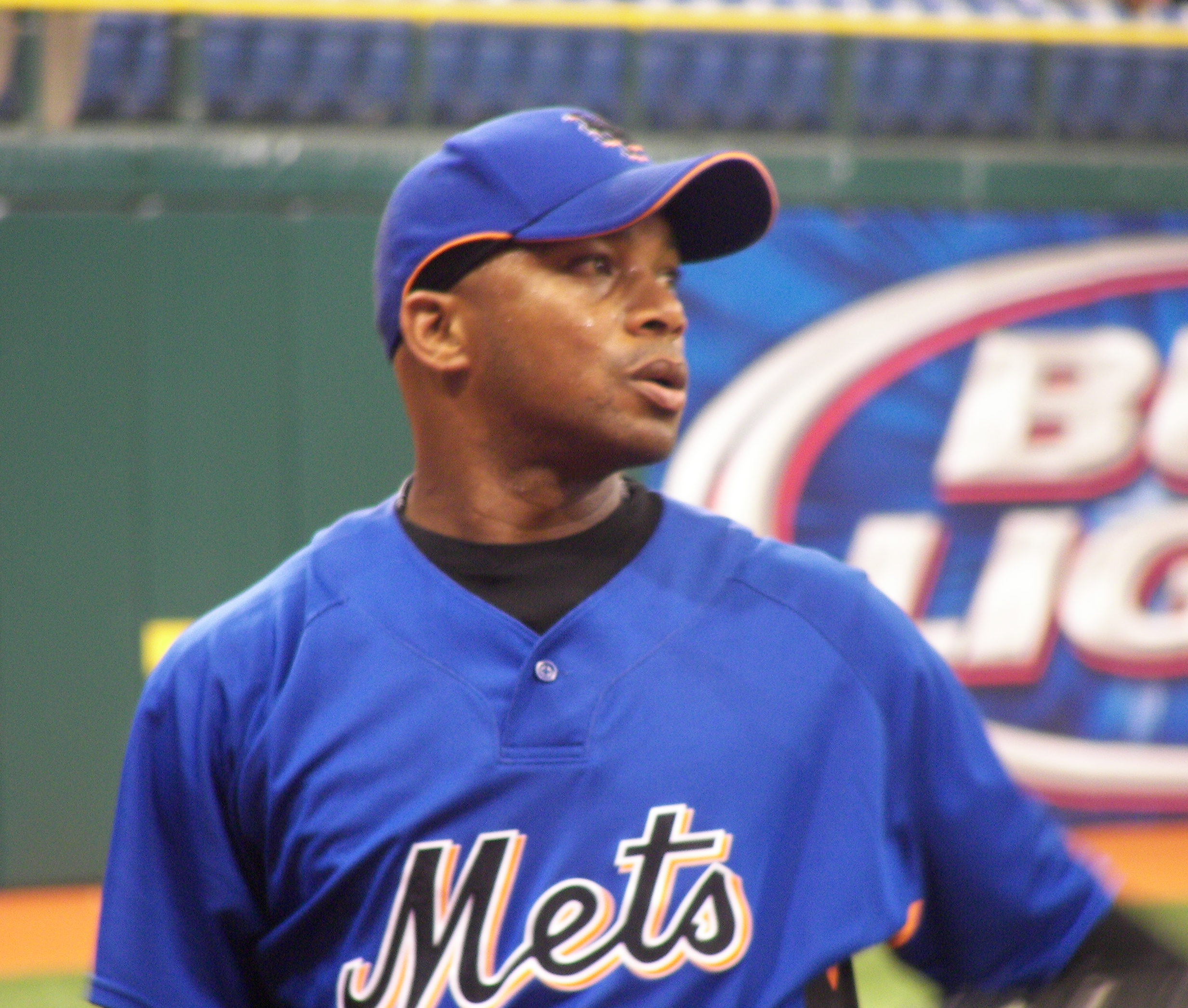
Orlando "El Duque" Hernández defected from Cuba in 1997.

== Background ==
Prior to the Cuban Revolution, which saw Castro rise to power in 1959, Cuban-born players often played in the American Negro leagues and in Major League Baseball (MLB). Following the revolution, U.S.–Cuba relations became strained, and Castro ended professional baseball in Cuba (the Cuban League) and forbade Cuban players to play abroad.

Some players defected during the Cold War. Rogelio Álvarez, who debuted in MLB in 1960, was barred from continuing his professional career in the United States, and defected from Cuba through Mexico in 1963. Bárbaro Garbey left Cuba in the Mariel boatlift in 1980. After the fall of the Soviet Union in 1991, Cuba's economy struggled badly and faced severe repercussions from the embargo. Baseball players began to seek careers in MLB due to the high salaries. In 1991, René Arocha defected. He was followed by Rey Ordóñez in 1993. Rolando Arrojo defected during the 1996 Summer Olympics, which were held in the U.S. The Cuban government treats attempted defectors as disloyal, which led to increased defections. Orlando Hernández was loyal to Cuba, until he was banned from the national team following the defection of his half-brother, Liván.

Players attempting to play in MLB often choose not to defect to the U.S. or Canada, because establishing residency there subjects them to the Major League Baseball draft. By defecting to another nation, they can be considered international free agents.

In 2008, Joe Kehoskie, a former baseball agent who represented several dozen Cuban players, told author Michael Lewis, "There’s at least half a billion dollars of baseball players in Cuba right now and probably a lot more." By the end of 2014, approximately 30 subsequent Cuban defectors had signed MLB contracts totaling just under $500 million.

The largest contract given to a Cuban defector was outfielder Rusney Castillo's seven-year contract with the Boston Red Sox, signed in 2014, worth $72.5 million. First baseman José Abreu signed a six-year contract worth $68 million with the Chicago White Sox in 2013. The largest contract given to a pitcher was the $32 million the New York Yankees gave to José Contreras in 2002, while the Cincinnati Reds signed Aroldis Chapman for $30.25 million in 2010.

While some players who defected have obtained multimillion-dollar contracts to play in MLB, many received only minor-league contracts and did not reach MLB, and many others didn't sign contracts at all. Players who defect are often separated from their families, leading to severed relationships, such as between Jorge Toca and the mother of his son.

In late 2018, an agreement was reached between MLB, the Major League Baseball Players Association (MLBPA), and the Baseball Federation of Cuba. The agreement created a legal path for Cuban baseball players to sign with MLB teams without having to defect. However, the Trump administration declared the agreement illegal and revoked it in April 2019. Since then, players have continued to defect, such as Lázaro Blanco in 2021.

== List ==
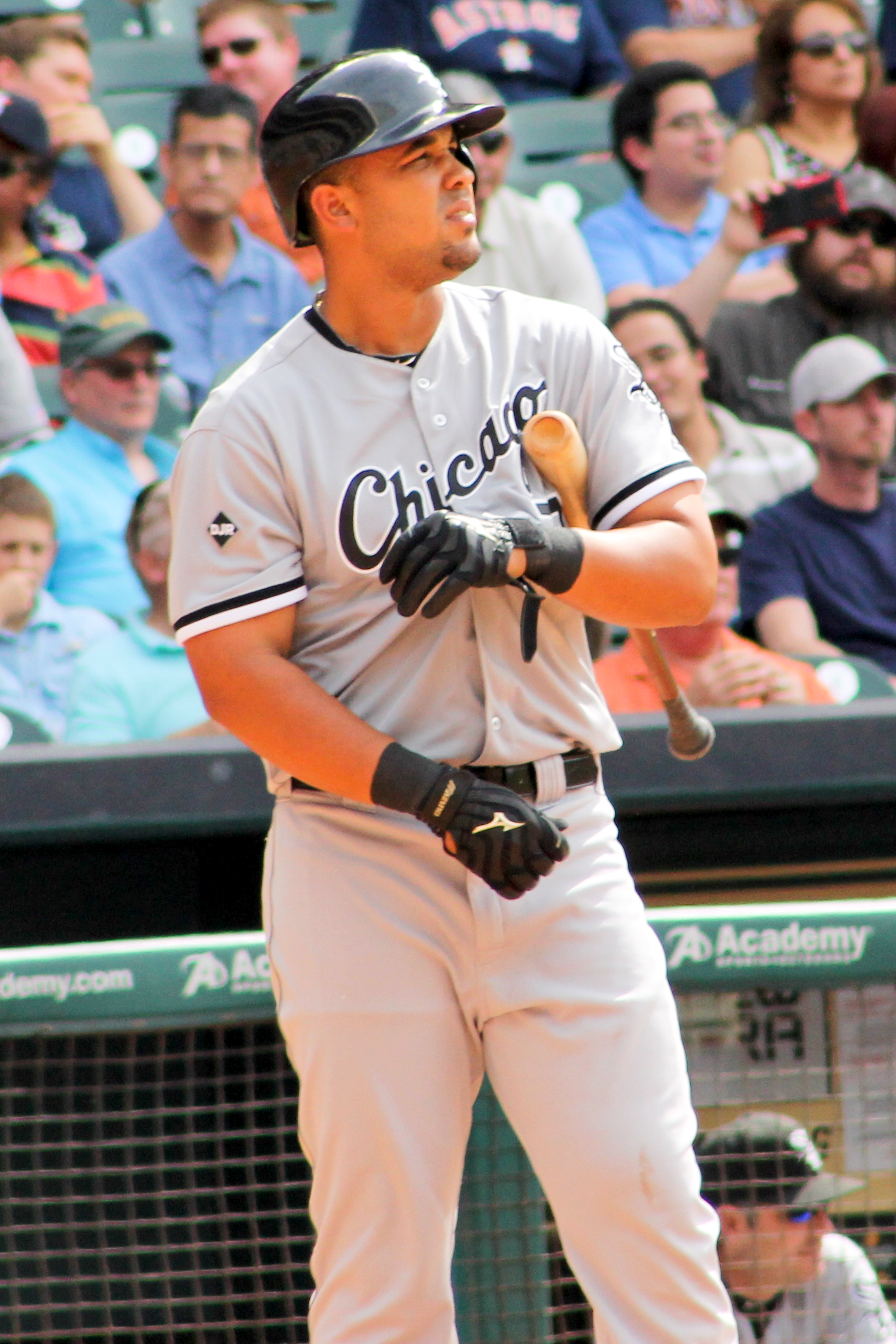
José Abreu

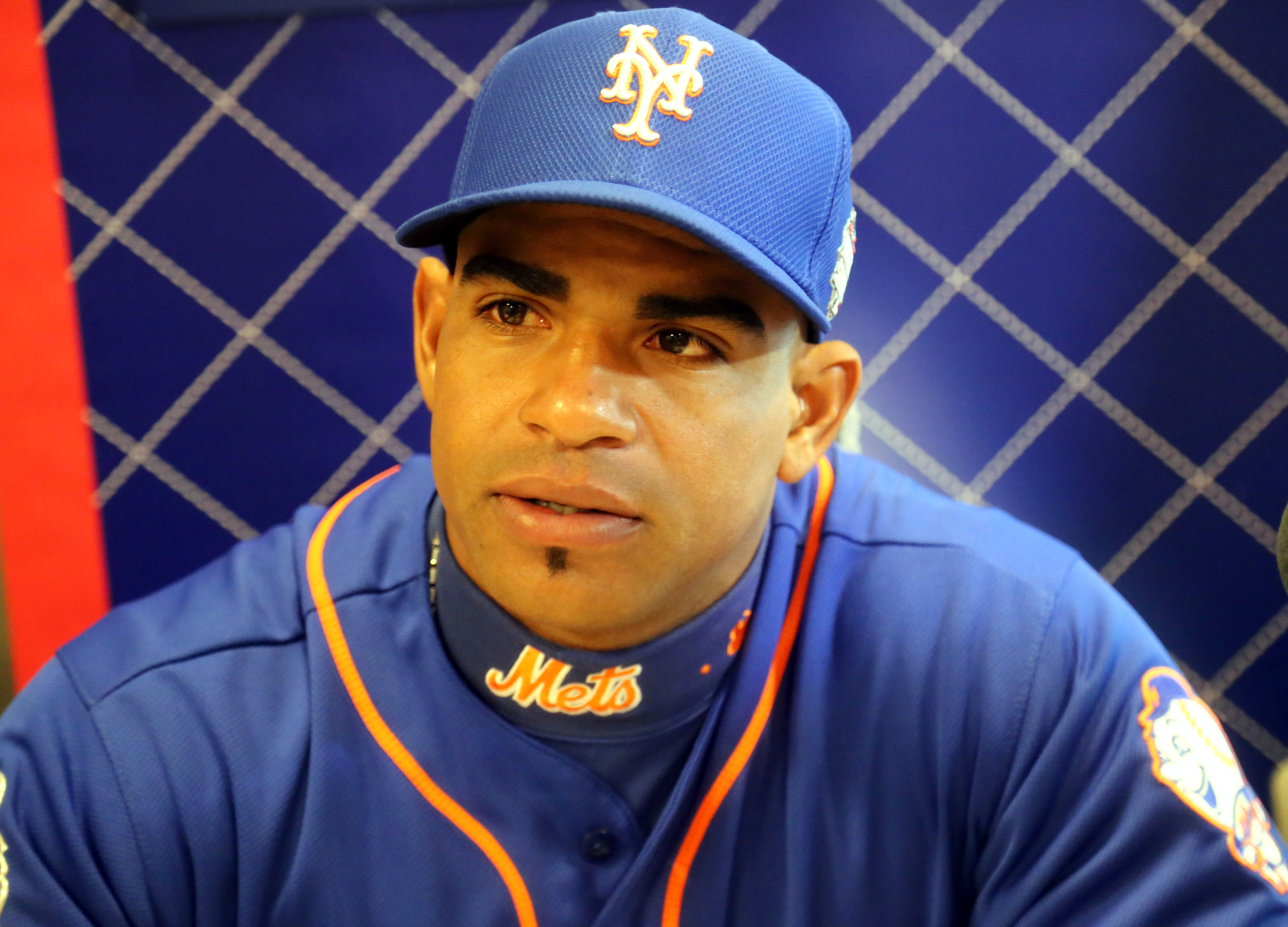
Yoenis Céspedes

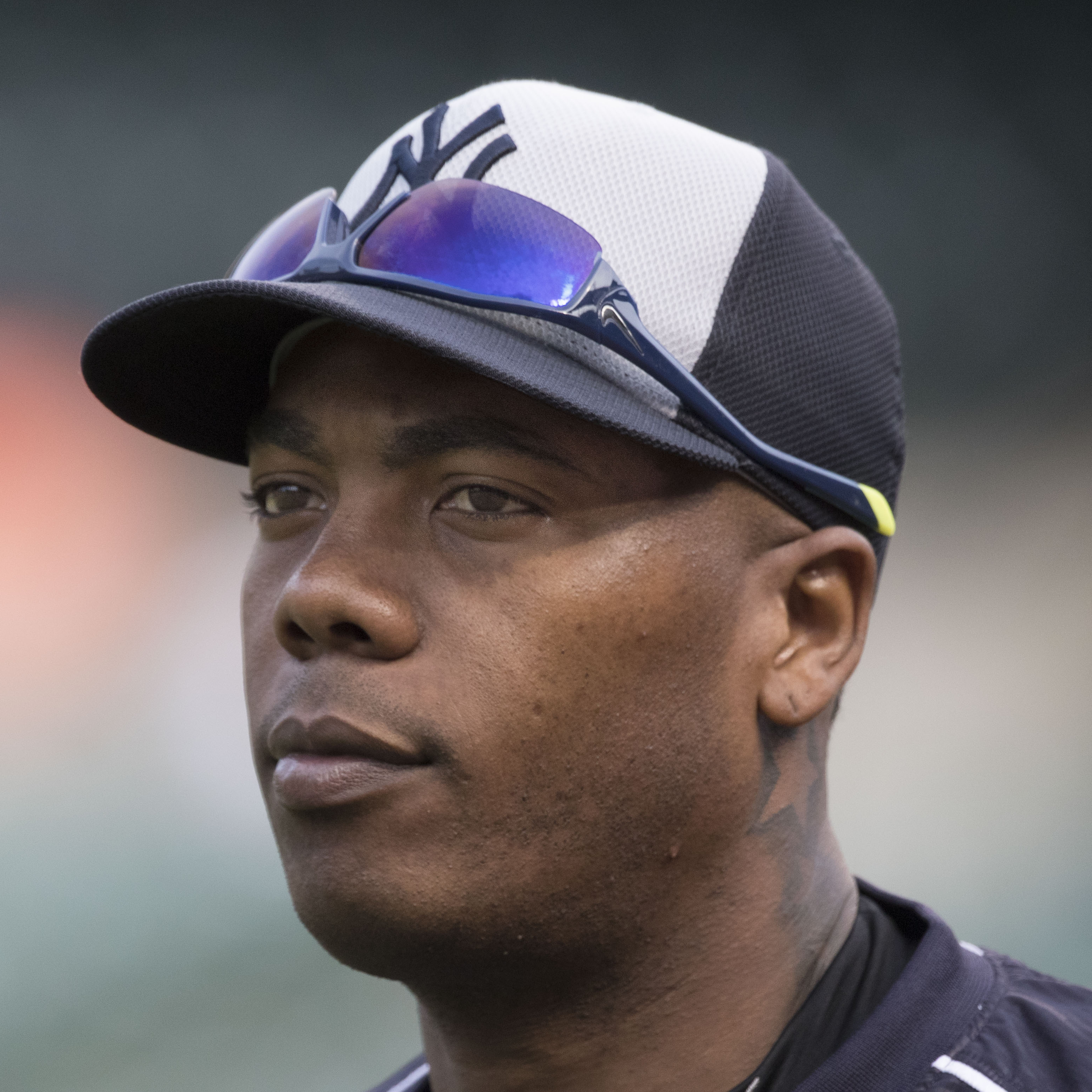
Aroldis Chapman

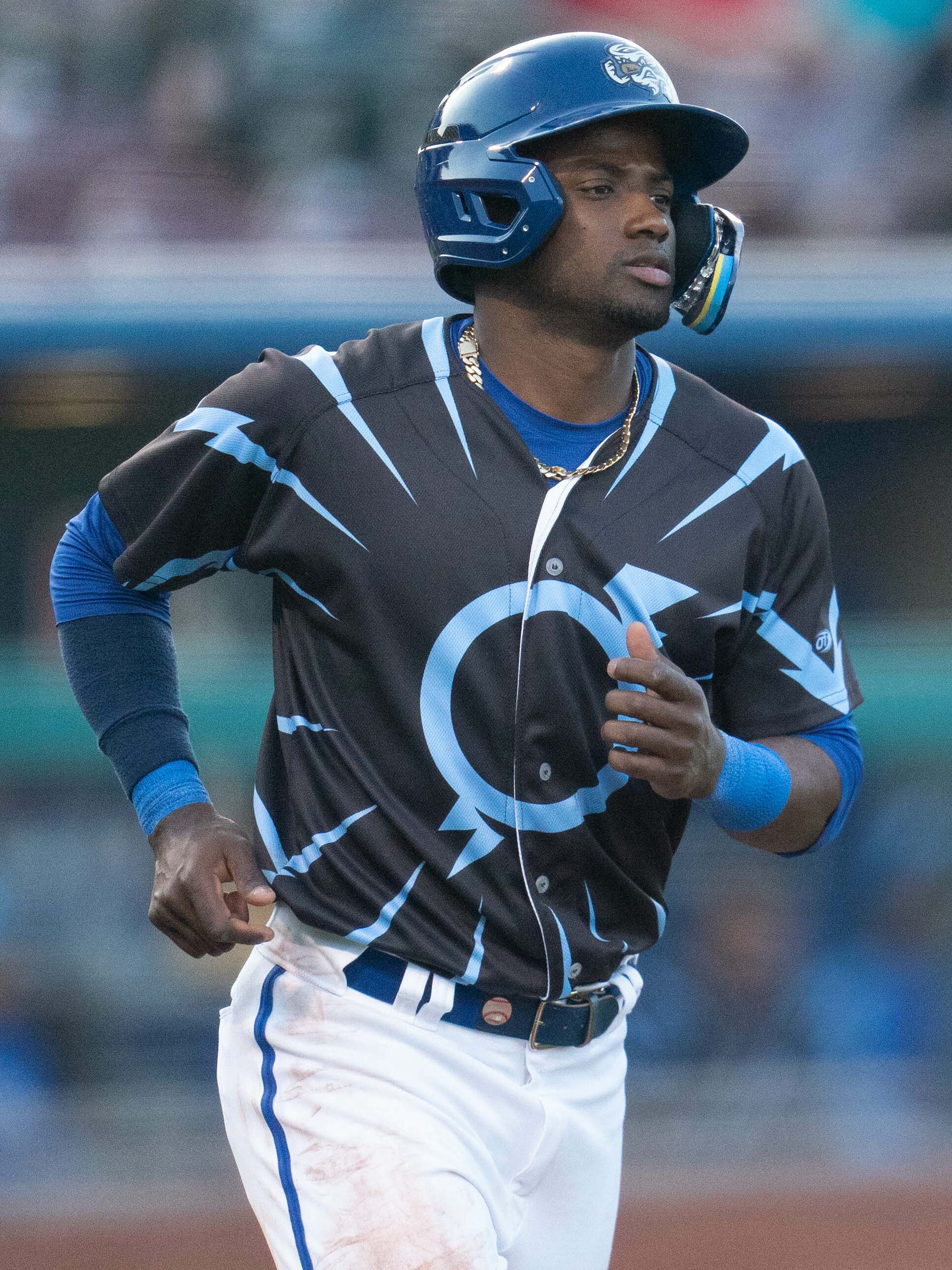
Adeiny Hechavarria

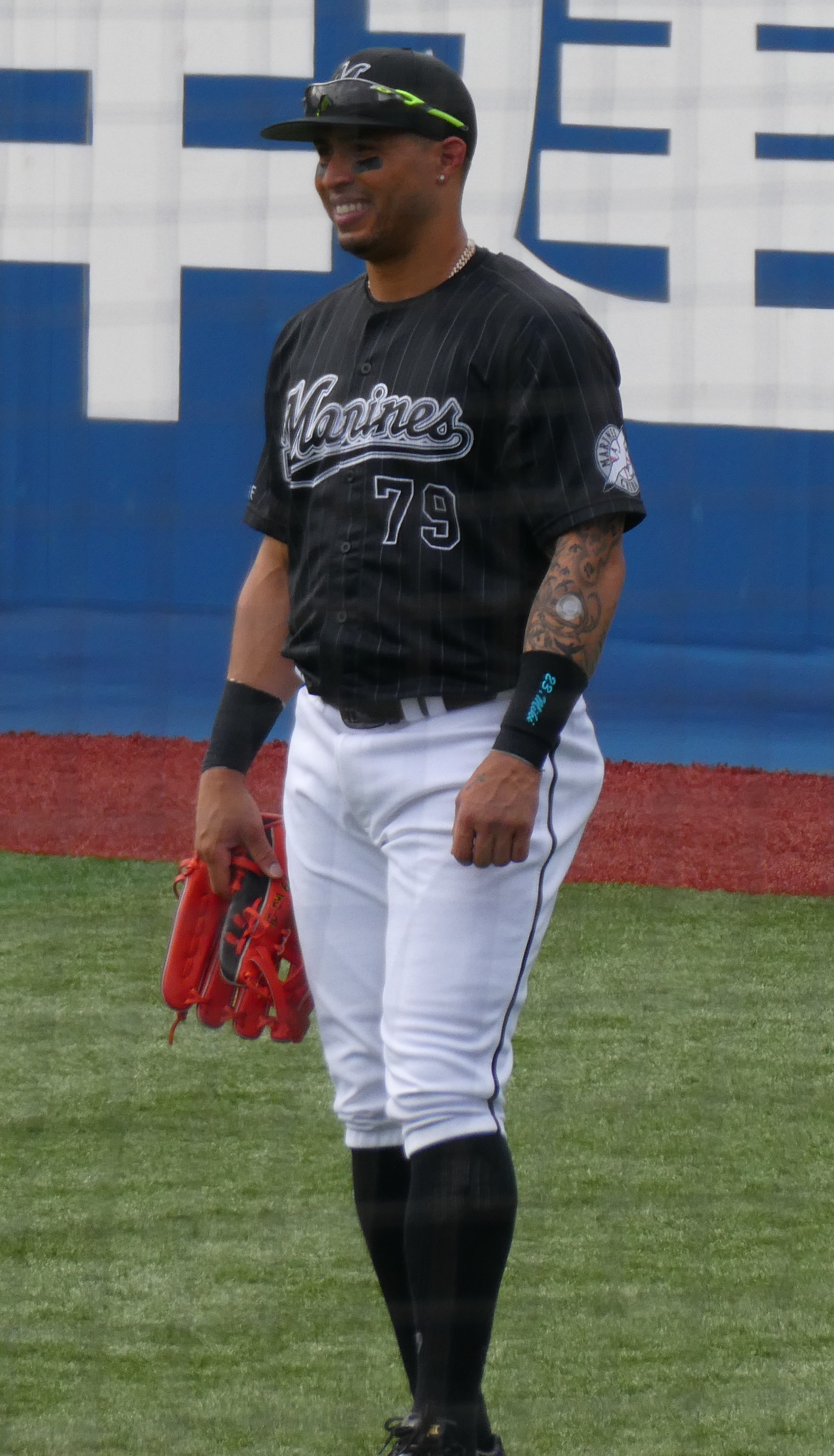
Leonys Martín

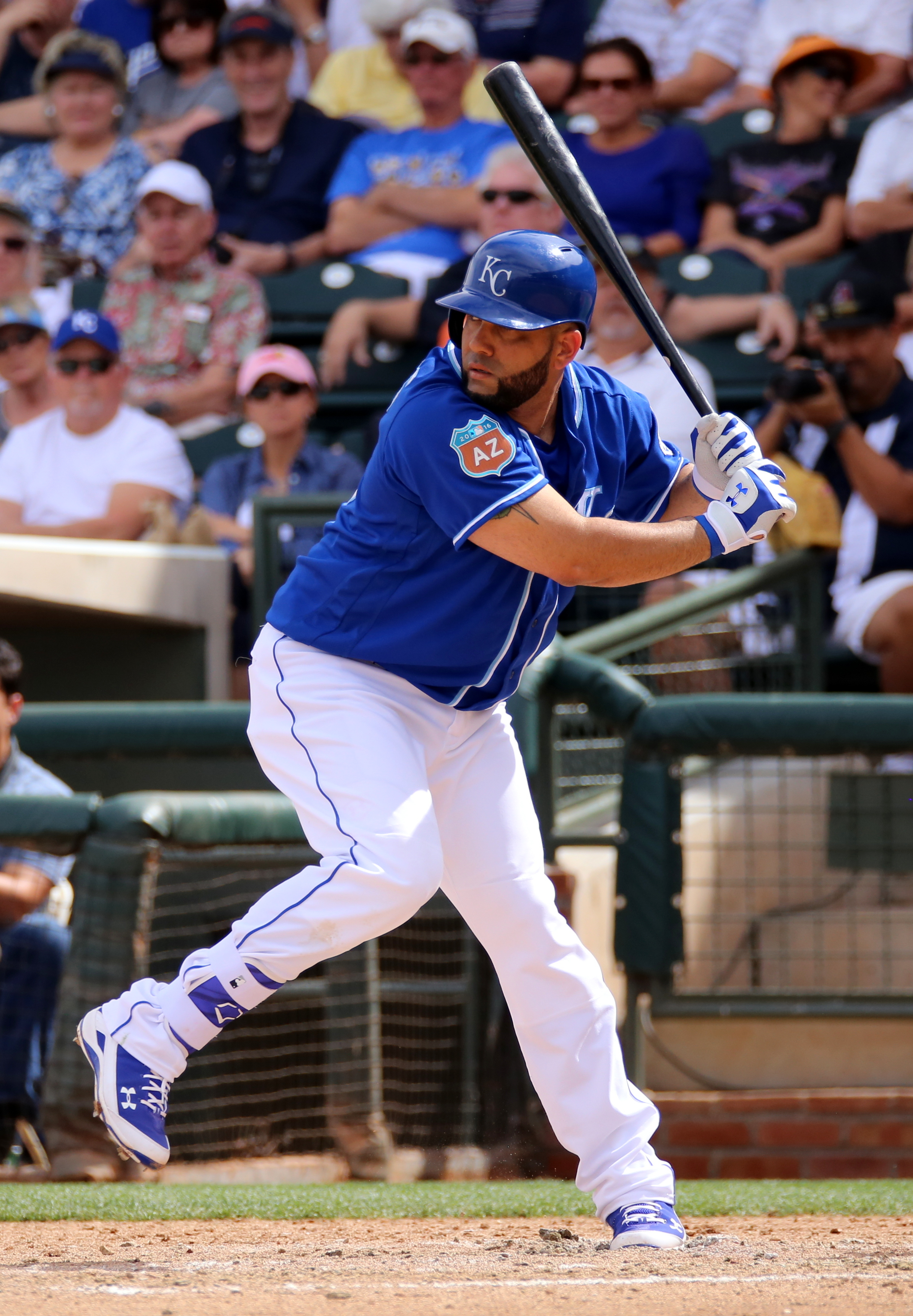
Kendrys Morales

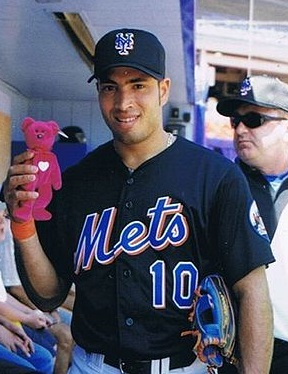
Rey Ordóñez

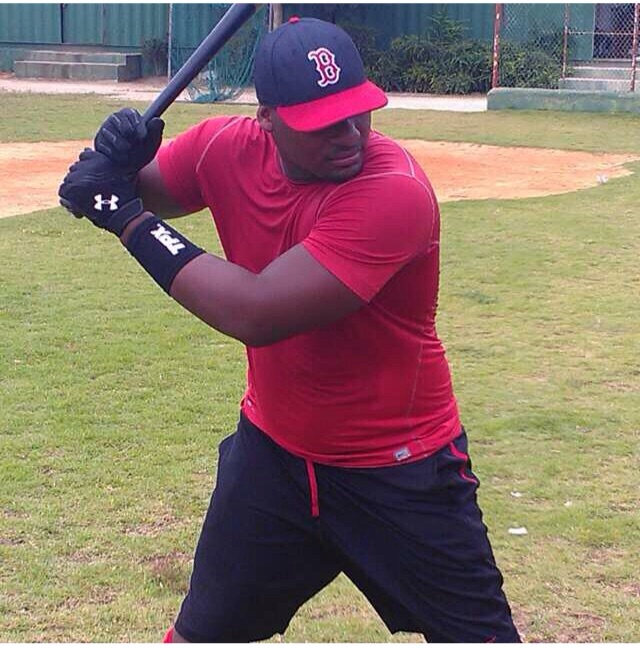
Victor Rivas

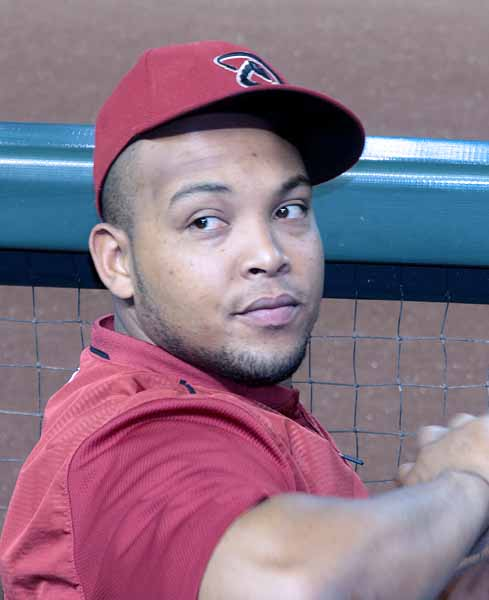
Yasmany Tomas

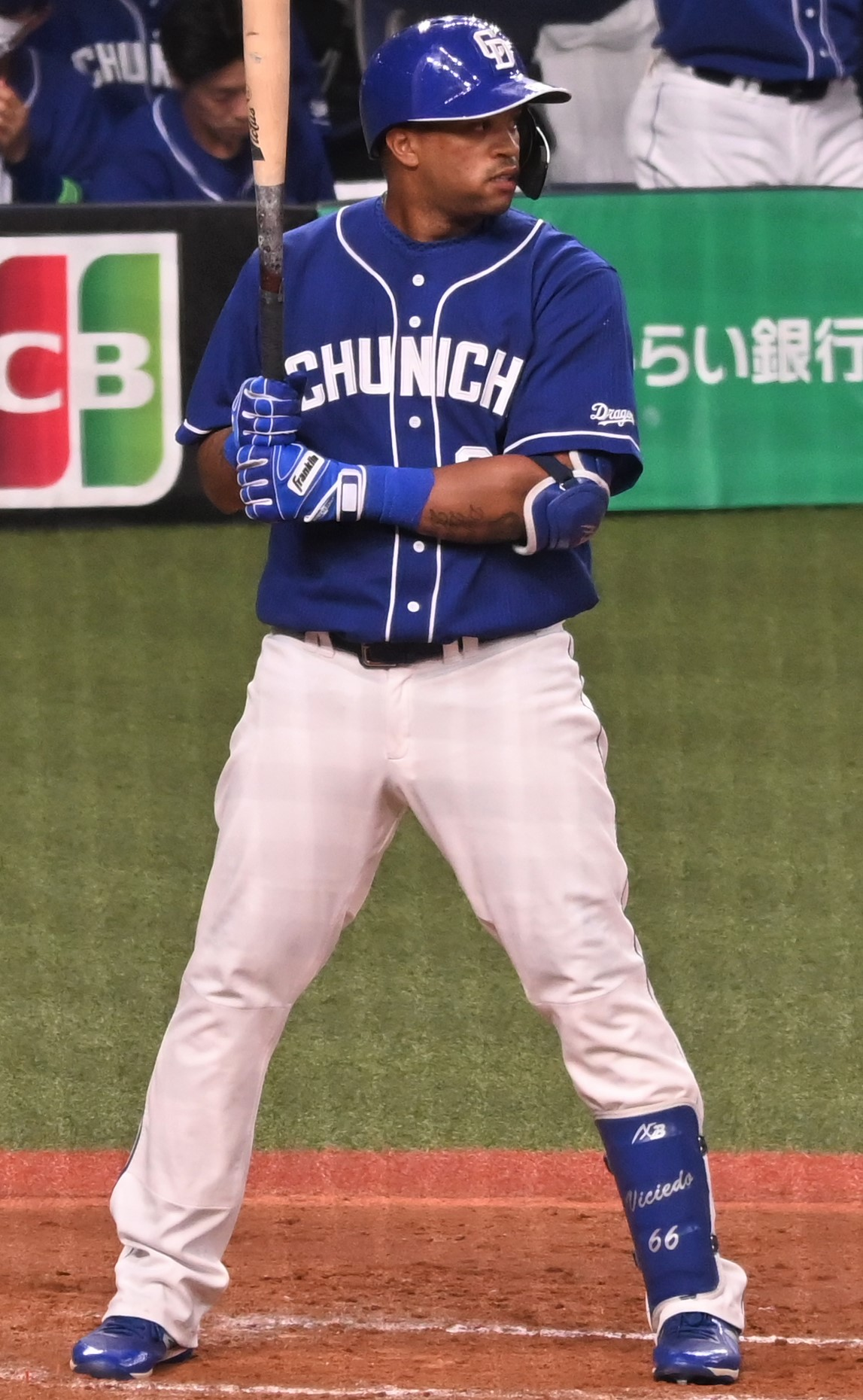
Dayán Viciedo

Key
†	MLB All-Star
‡	Denotes player who is still active

Defectors
Player	Position	Year defected	MLB debut	MLB seasons	Ref
José Abreu	First baseman	2013	March 31, 2014	11	
Michel Abreu	Outfielder	2004	—	—	
Dariel Álvarez	Outfielder	2012	August 28, 2015	2^{‡}	
Rogelio Álvarez	First baseman	1963	September 18, 1960	2	
Yordan Alvarez^{†}	Outfielder	2016	June 9, 2019	3^{‡}	
Jesús Ametller	Second baseman	1996	—	—	
Leslie Anderson	Outfielder	2010	—	—	
René Arocha	Pitcher	1991	April 9, 1993	4	
Randy Arozarena^{†}	Outfielder	2015	August 14, 2019	3^{‡}	
Noel Argüelles	Pitcher	2008	—	—	
Erisbel Arruebarrena	Shortstop	2013	May 23, 2014	1^{‡}	
Rolando Arrojo^{†}	Pitcher	1996	April 1, 1998	5	
Danys Báez^{†}	Pitcher	1999	May 13, 2001	10	
Roberto Baldoquin	Second baseman	2014	—	—	
Alexei Bell	Outfielder	2016	—	—	
Yenier Bello	Catcher	2013	—	—	
Yuniesky Betancourt	Shortstop	2003	July 28, 2005	9	
Dairon Blanco	Outfielder	2016	May 20, 2022	1^{‡}	
Lázaro Blanco	Pitcher	2021	—	—	
Francisley Bueno	Pitcher	2004	August 13, 2008	2	
Bárbaro Cañizares	First baseman	2004	June 11, 2009	1	
Daniel Carbonell	Outfielder	2013	—	—	
Alberto Castillo	Pitcher	1993	July 8, 2008	4	
Diosdany Castillo	Pitcher	2014	—	—	
Rusney Castillo	Outfielder	2013	September 17, 2014	3^{‡}	
Amaury Cazana	Outfielder	2005	—	—	
Geisel Cepeda	Outfielder	2021	—	—	
Yoelkis Céspedes	Outfielder	2019	—	—	
Yoenis Céspedes^{†}	Outfielder	2011	March 28, 2012	8^{‡}	
Loidel Chapelli Jr.	Outfielder	2021	—	—	
Aroldis Chapman^{†}	Pitcher	2009	August 31, 2010	12^{‡}	
Oscar Colas	Outfielder	2020	March 30, 2023	1^{‡}	
Roberto Colina	First baseman	1996	—	—	
Gerardo Concepción	Pitcher	2011	June 21, 2016	1	
José Contreras^{†}	Pitcher	2002	March 31, 2003	11	
Josimar Cousín	Pitcher	2022	—	—	
Jozzen Cuesta	First baseman	2013	—	—	
Odrisamer Despaigne	Pitcher	2013	June 23, 2014	6^{‡}	
Aledmys Díaz	Shortstop	2012	April 5, 2016	6^{‡}	
Juan Díaz	First baseman	1995	June 12, 2002	1	
Yandy Díaz^{†}	Third baseman	2013	April 3, 2017	5^{‡}	
Roenis Elías	Pitcher	2010	April 3, 2014	6^{‡}	
Yunel Escobar	Shortstop	2004	June 2, 2007	11	
José Fernández^{†}	Pitcher	2008	April 7, 2013	4	
José Miguel Fernández	Infielder	2015	June 8, 2018	1^{‡}	
Osvaldo Fernández	Pitcher	1995	April 5, 1996	4	
Bárbaro Garbey	First baseman	1980	April 3, 1984	3	
Adonis García	Outfielder	2011	May 19, 2015	3^{‡}	
Adolis García^{†}	Outfielder	2016	August 8, 2018	3^{‡}	
Onelki García	Pitcher	2010	September 11, 2013	2^{‡}	
Yasser Gómez	Outfielder	2008	—	—	
Miguel Alfredo González	Pitcher	2013	September 3, 2014	1	
Lourdes Gurriel Jr.^{†}	Infielder	2016	April 20, 2018	4^{‡}	
Luis Enrique Gurriel Jr.	Outfielder	2024	—	—	
Yulieski Gurriel	Infielder	2016	August 21, 2016	6^{‡}	
Alex Guerrero	Shortstop	2013	March 22, 2014	2	
Vladimir Gutiérrez	Pitcher	2015	May 28, 2021	1^{‡}	
Adeiny Hechavarria	Shortstop	2009	August 4, 2012	9^{‡}	
Guillermo Heredia	Outfielder	2015	July 29, 2016	5^{‡}	
Adrián Hernández	Pitcher	2000	April 21, 2001	7	
Liván Hernández^{†}	Pitcher	1995	September 24, 1996	17	
Michel Hernández	Catcher	1996	September 6, 2003	3	
Orlando Hernández	Pitcher	1997	June 3, 1998	9	
Yoslan Herrera	Pitcher	2005	July 12, 2008	2	
Dalier Hinojosa	Pitcher	2013	May 3, 2015	2	
Andy Ibáñez	Second baseman	2014	May 4, 2021	1^{‡}	
Yunior Ibarra	Catcher	2023	—	—	
José Iglesias	Shortstop	2008	May 8, 2011	15	
Raisel Iglesias	Pitcher	2013	April 12, 2015	7^{‡}	
Hansel Izquierdo	Pitcher	1994	April 21, 2002	1	
Dyan Yamel Jorge	Shortstop	2020	—	—	
Raudel Lazo	Pitcher	2011	September 5, 2015	1	
J.C. Linares	Outfielder	2009	—	—	
Yoan López	Pitcher	2014	September 9, 2018	4^{‡}	
Yadel Martí	Pitcher	2008	—	—	
Leonys Martín	Outfielder	2010	September 2, 2011	9^{‡}	
J. P. Martínez	Outfielder	2017	August 11, 2023	1^{‡}	
Yunesky Maya	Pitcher	2009	September 7, 2010	3^{‡}	
Ubert Mejías	Pitcher	2021	—	—	
Víctor Víctor Mesa	Outfielder	2018	—	—	
Juan Miranda	First baseman	2005	September 18, 2008	4	
Andy Morales	Third baseman	2000	—	—	
Luis Danys Morales	Pitcher	2021	—	—	
Kendrys Morales	First baseman	2004	May 23, 2006	13	
Adrian Morejón^{†}	Pitcher	2015	July 21, 2019	3^{‡}	
Yadil Mujica	Shortstop	2009	—	—	
Gabriel Eduardo Mustelier	Infielder	2023	—	—	
Ronnier Mustelier	Outfielder/Third baseman	2009	—	—	
Vladimir Núñez	Pitcher	1995	September 11, 1998	9	
Héctor Olivera	Second baseman	2014	September 1, 2015	2	
Jorge Oña	Outfielder	2015	September 7, 2020	2^{‡}	
Rey Ordóñez	Shortstop	1993	April 1, 1996	9	
Eddie Oropesa	Pitcher	1993	April 2, 2001	4	
Bill Ortega	Outfielder	1996	September 7, 2001	1	
Andy Pages	Outfielder	2017	April 16, 2024	1^{‡}	
Brayan Peña	Catcher	1999	May 23, 2005	13	
Hassan Peña	Pitcher	2005	—	—	
Orlando Pérez	Infielder	2013	—	—	
Ariel Prieto	Pitcher	1995	July 2, 1995	7	
Iván Prieto	Catcher	2023	—	—	
Yasiel Puig	Outfielder	2012	June 3, 2013	7	
Alexei Ramírez	Shortstop	2007	March 31, 2008	9	
Roberto Carlos Ramírez	Shortstop	2011	—	—	
Alejandro Regueira	Catcher	2021	—	—	
Victor Rivas	First baseman	2013	—	—	
Luis Robert	Outfielder	2017	July 24, 2020	7^{‡}	
Eddy Rodríguez	Catcher	1993	August 2, 2012	1	
Larry Rodríguez	Pitcher	1995	—	—	
Omar Luis Rodriguez	Pitcher	2012	—	—	
Yariel Rodríguez	Pitcher	2023	April 13, 2024	—	
Euclides Rojas	Pitcher	1994	—	—	
José Julio Ruiz	First baseman	2009	—	—	
Alex Sánchez	Outfielder	1994	June 15, 2001	7	
Amauri Sanit	Pitcher	2006	May 12, 2011	1	
Juan Yasser Serrano	Pitcher	2009	—	—	
Misael Siverio	Pitcher	2013	—	—	
Alay Soler	Pitcher	2003	May 24, 2006	1	
Jorge Soler	Outfielder	2011	August 27, 2014	8^{‡}	
Deinis Suárez	Pitcher	2009	—	—	
Michael Tejera	Pitcher	1994	September 8, 1999	5	
Jorge Toca	First baseman	1998	September 12, 1999	3	
Yasmany Tomás	Outfielder	2014	April 4, 2015	4^{‡}	
Henry Urrutia	Outfielder	2011	July 20, 2013	2^{‡}	
Raúl Valdés	Pitcher	2003	April 11, 2010	5	
Miguel Vargas^{†}	Third baseman	2015	August 3, 2022	5^{‡}	
John Valle	Pitcher	2021	—	—	
Dayán Viciedo	Outfielder	2008	June 20, 2010	5^{‡}	

== See also ==
- List of Cuban football players who have defected to the United States
- List of Major League Baseball players from Cuba
