= Victor Rivas =

Cuban baseball player

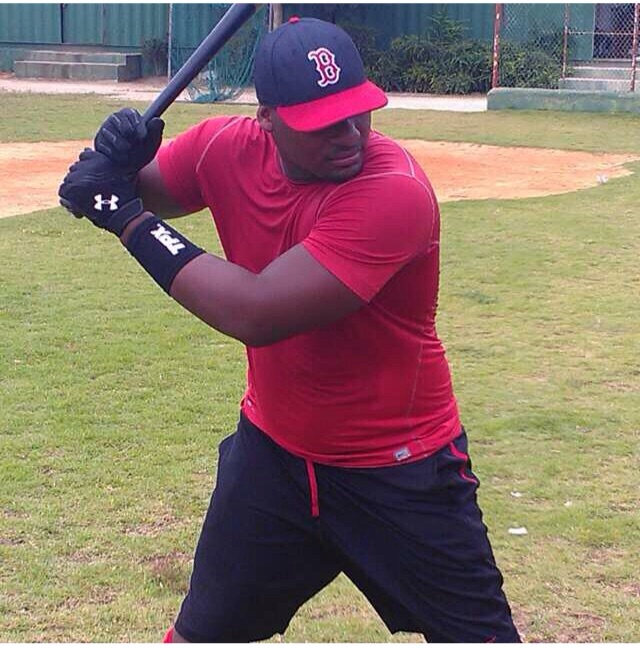
- Rivas at batting practice in the Dominican Republic
- First baseman
- Born: April 30, 1992 (age 34); Isla de la Juventud, Cuba
- Bats: Right Throws: Right
Medals
Men's baseball
Representing Cuba
18U Baseball World Cup
| Bronze medal – third place | 2010 Thunder Bay | Team |

Victor Rivas Goire (born April 30, 1992), also known as Victor Rivas, is a Cuban professional baseball first baseman.

Rivas played for the Cuba national baseball team in two international competitions. At age 17 he debuted on the Cuban national team adult roster, where he played two seasons. At age 19, he attempted to defect from Cuba in 2011, seeking a career in Major League Baseball, but was unsuccessful and banned by the Cuban government and from participating in baseball for two years. Rivas then attempted to defect a second time, and was banned from playing baseball for another year. He then left the island legally a third time to Haiti, where he established residency.

== Cuban career and defection ==
Rivas played for the Cuban National Baseball Team in the 2010 World Junior Baseball Championship, during which he stole home on a wild pitch. The International Baseball Federation acknowledged Rivas as the premier player for the Cuban National Team. Cuba won the bronze medal. Rivas also played briefly in the Cuban National Series for Isla de la Juventud in addition to the 2009 World Junior Championship in Barquisimeto, Venezuela.

He played on the Cuban roster with Jorge Soler, Raisel Iglesias, Yandy Dias, Jesus Balager, Omar Luis and Yander La Oss; all of whom signed professional contracts with Major League Baseball Organizations and are currently playing in the Major Leagues, AA and AAA in the minor leagues.

Rivas defected from Cuba in 2013 to pursue his career in Major League Baseball (MLB). During his training in the Dominican Republic, many teams visited and watched Rivas practice. Numerous MLB teams had strong interest in signing him, but he did not have his free agent clearance with MLB, with the primary reason due to lack of guidance, improper management and negligence with the process of his paperwork. Rivas is living in the United States and under new agent representation. He is an eligible international free agent with clearance to sign immediately sign with an MLB organization and currently possesses a valid work permit which he recently received from the offices of the USCIS, United States Citizenship and Immigration Services.

== Scouting profile ==
Rivas is 6 feet 2 inches (1.88 m) and weighs 250 pounds (110 kg). He is described as a heavy-hitting infielder who would play first base. Steve Fiorindo, of The Prospect Pipeline, described Rivas in 2015 as a "strong kid. Pretty loud off the bat." According to the IBAF he is acknowledged as the premier player for the Cuban National Team, there were a lot of good players to watch, but beware of Victor Rivas. The IBAF went on describing Rivas as having proved himself very productive with the bat. Rivas is a power asset on any AA or AAA minor league roster, for any MLB team in need of an aggressive international player with exceptional offensive skills. Current bat velocity 108 miles per hour.

== See also ==
- List of baseball players who defected from Cuba
