= Keisho Shirakawa =

Japanese baseball player (born 2001)

Keisho Shirakawa 白川恵翔 시라카와 케이쇼
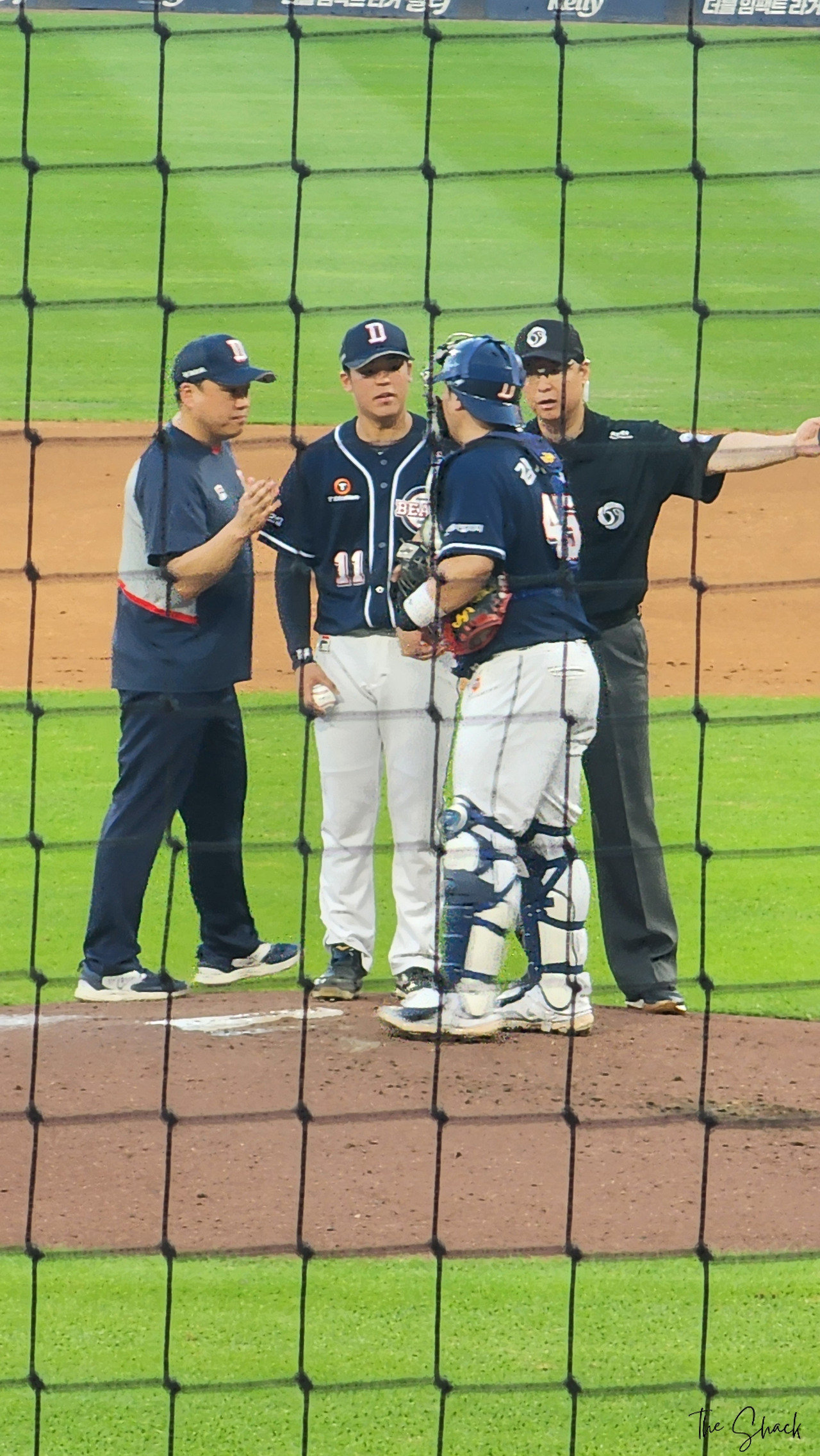
- Shirakawa with the Doosan Bears

Kia Tigers – No. 63
- Pitcher
- Born: June 4, 2001 (age 25); Japan
- Bats: Right Throws: Right

KBO debut
- June 1, 2024, for the SSG Landers

KBO statistics (through August 19, 2026)
- Win–loss record: 7–9
- Earned run average: 5.08
- Strikeouts: 86
- Stats at Baseball Reference

Teams
- SSG Landers (2024); Doosan Bears (2024); Kia Tigers (2026–present)

Keisho Shirakawa (Japanese:白川恵翔, Korean:시라카와 케이쇼 born June 4, 2001) is a Japanese professional baseball pitcher for the Kia Tigers of the KBO League. He has previously played in the KBO League for the SSG Landers and Doosan Bears.

== Career ==
=== Tokushima Indigo Socks ===
Shirakawa began his career in 2020 with the Tokushima Indigo Socks of the Shikoku Island League Plus. In 15 appearances for the club in 2023, he compiled a 4–3 record and 3.56 ERA with 68 strikeouts across 55 2/3 innings pitched. In 2024, Shirakawa registered a 4–1 record and 2.17 ERA (third in the league) with 31 strikeouts (second in the league) across six appearances.

=== SSG Landers ===
On May 23, 2024, Shirakawa signed with the SSG Landers of the KBO League. The signing was made as part of a new rule that allowed the Landers to temporarily replace Roenis Elías after he suffered an injury. On July 3, Elías returned from his injury, and Shirakawa was released by the Landers, having made 5 starts for the team.

=== Doosan Bears ===
On July 10, 2024, Shirakawa signed a six-week contract with the Doosan Bears as an injury replacement for Brandon Waddell, who had suffered a shoulder injury in June. After his initial contract expired, Doosan re-signed Shirakawa to a 15-day, 1.4 million yen contract on August 21. In 12 total starts split between the Landers and Bears, he compiled a 4–5 record and 5.65 ERA with 46 strikeouts across 57 1/3 innings pitched. On August 28, it was announced that Shirakawa would miss the remainder of the season with elbow issues.

=== Kia Tigers ===
On May 28, 2026, Shirakawa signed a $100,000, rest–of–season contract with the Kia Tigers of the KBO League.
