= Nate Teut =

American baseball player (born 1976)

- Pitcher
- Born: March 11, 1976 (age 49); Newton, Iowa
- Batted: Right Threw: Left

MLB debut
- May 4, 2002, for the Florida Marlins

Last MLB appearance
- June 27, 2002, for the Florida Marlins

MLB statistics
- Win–loss record: 0–1
- Earned run average: 9.82
- Strikeouts: 4
- Stats at Baseball Reference

Teams
- Florida Marlins (2002)

Nathan Mark Teut (pronounced "TOYT") (born March 11, 1976) is an American former baseball pitcher. He played for the Florida Marlins of Major League Baseball in 2002.

== Career ==
Teut was drafted in the 4th round of the 1997 MLB draft by the Chicago Cubs. Neut spent one year each in the Marlins and Milwaukee Brewers organizations, but spent most of his career in the Cubs organization. After retiring from baseball, Nate joined the front office staff at the Iowa Cubs doing sales and worked his way up to the position of Assistant General Manager and Executive Vice President. Departing the Iowa Cubs in the summer of 2017, Nate joined the Des Moines Buccaneers Hockey Club (USHL) as the organizations President following the change in team ownership.
