= Jorge Toca =

Cuban baseball player (born 1975)

- First baseman
- Born: January 7, 1975 (age 51); Remedios, Villa Clara Province, Cuba
- Batted: Right Threw: Right

MLB debut
- September 12, 1999, for the New York Mets

Last MLB appearance
- October 7, 2001, for the New York Mets

MLB statistics
- Batting average: .259
- Home runs: 0
- Runs batted in: 5
- Stats at Baseball Reference

Teams
- New York Mets (1999–2001)
Medals
Men's baseball
Representing Cuba
Baseball World Cup
Gold medal – first place	1994 Managua	Team
Intercontinental Cup
Gold medal – first place	1995 Havana	Team
Pan American Games
Gold medal – first place	1995 Mar del Plata	Team

Jorge Luis Toca (born January 7, 1975) is a Cuban former professional baseball player.

== Career ==
He played with the New York Mets from 1999 to 2001. He is 6 ft 3 in (191 cm) tall and weighs 220 lb (100 kg). He plays first base and outfield. He bats and throws right-handed. He is mostly remembered for losing grip and letting his bat fly into the stands after swings on multiple occasions. He most recently played for the Acereros de Monclova in the Mexican League in 2007.

On May 12, 2005, while playing in the minor leagues, Toca was suspended 15 games for violating the Minor League baseball drug policy.

== See also ==
- List of baseball players who defected from Cuba
