= Roenis Elías =

Cuban baseball player (born 1988)

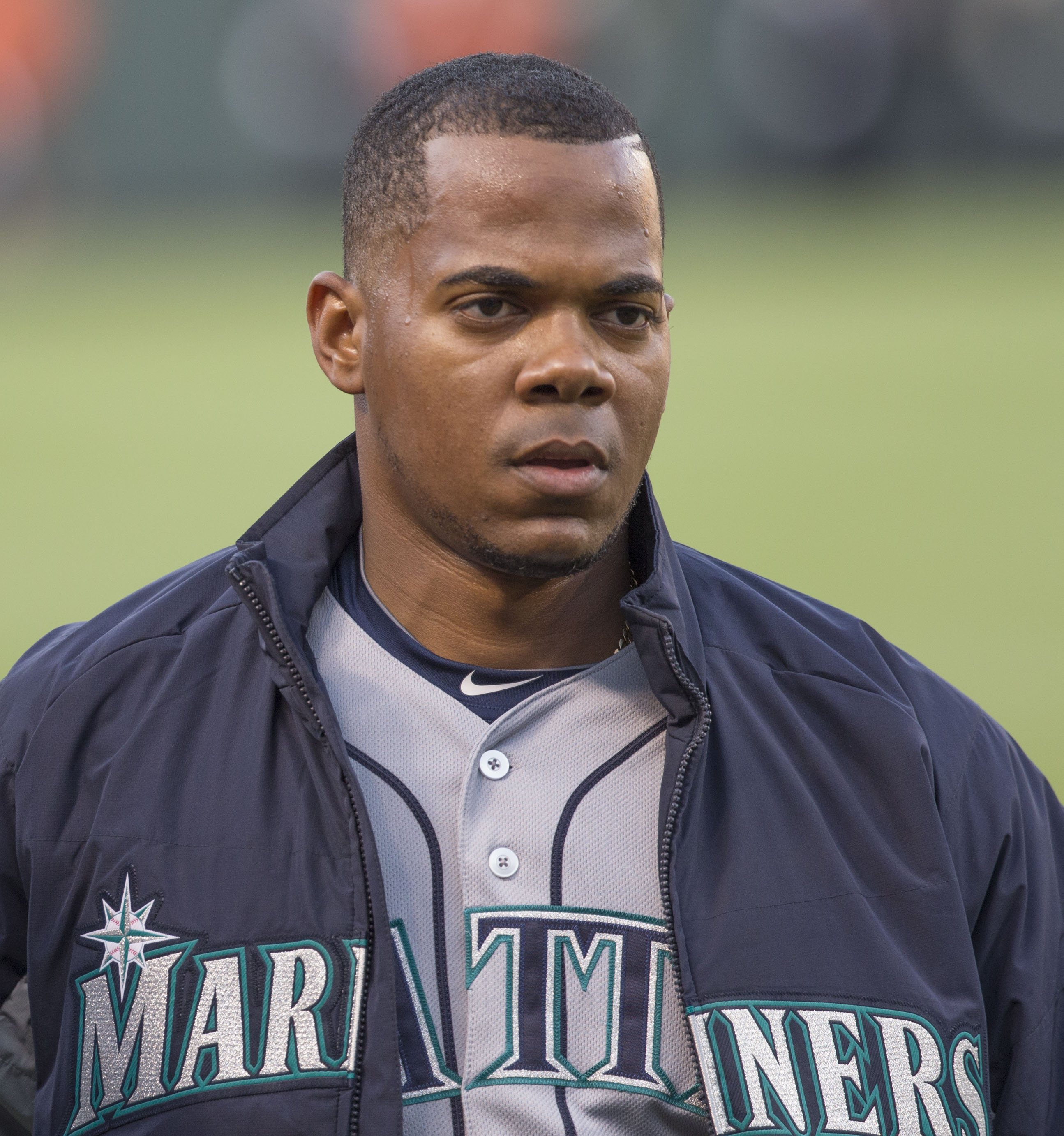
- Elías with the Seattle Mariners

Algodoneros de Unión Laguna – No. 55
- Pitcher
- Born: August 1, 1988 (age 38); Guantánamo, Cuba
- Bats: Left Throws: Left

Professional debut
- MLB: April 3, 2014, for the Seattle Mariners
- KBO: May 24, 2023, for the SSG Landers
- CPBL: March 30, 2025, for the Fubon Guardians

MLB statistics (through 2022 season)
- Win–loss record: 22–24
- Earned run average: 3.96
- Strikeouts: 331

KBO statistics (through 2024 season)
- Win–loss record: 15–13
- Earned run average: 3.88
- Strikeouts: 197

CPBL statistics (through 2025 season)
- Win–loss record: 8-12
- Earned run average: 3.75
- Strikeouts: 114
- Stats at Baseball Reference

Teams
- Seattle Mariners (2014–2015); Boston Red Sox (2016–2017); Seattle Mariners (2018–2019); Washington Nationals (2019); Seattle Mariners (2022); SSG Landers (2023–2024); Fubon Guardians (2025)

Roenis Leliebre Elías (/roʊˈɛniːs ɛˈliːəs/; roh-EN-ees el-EE-əs; born August 1, 1988) is a Cuban professional baseball pitcher for the Algodoneros de Unión Laguna of the Mexican League. He has previously played in Major League Baseball (MLB) for the Boston Red Sox, Washington Nationals, and Seattle Mariners, and in the KBO League for the SSG Landers and in the Chinese Professional Baseball League (CPBL) for the Fubon Guardians.

== Professional career ==
=== Cuban career ===
Elías pitched two seasons for Guantánamo in the Cuban National Series. In the 2008–09 season, he pitched 31 innings in 18 games (one start), compiling a 2–3 record with a 7.84 earned run average (ERA). In the 2009–10 season, he had a 7.14 ERA with 5–7 record while pitching 63 innings in 21 games (17 starts).

Elías defected from Cuba in 2010, hoping to sign a contract with a Major League Baseball team. He traveled 30 hours by boat from Cuba to Cancún, Mexico. He initially played on the "B" team of the Sultanes de Monterrey in the Mexican League.

=== Seattle Mariners ===
Elías signed a minor league contract with the Seattle Mariners on May 3, 2011. He made his minor league debut that season and pitched for the Rookie League Pulaski Mariners and Arizona League Mariners, and the Single-A Clinton LumberKings. Overall, he went 5–2 with a 4.28 ERA and 41 strikeouts over 48 1/3 innings pitched.

In 2012, Marin played for the High-A High Desert Mavericks. He started 26 games, finishing with an 11–6 record, 3.76 ERA, 128 strikeouts over 148 1/3 innings pitched. He played the 2013 season with the Double-A Jackson Generals. He started 22 games, had a 6–11 record and 121 strikeouts over 130 innings.

Invited to spring training by the Mariners in 2014, Elías competed for a rotation spot on the Mariners' Opening Day roster, making the team as one of the starting pitchers. Elías made his Major League debut April 3, 2014. Against the Detroit Tigers on June 1, Elias recorded the team's first shutout by a rookie since Freddy García in 1999. For the 2014 season, Elías pitched in 29 games (all starts) for the Mariners, compiling a 10–12 record with 3.85 ERA in 163 2/3 innings pitched.

During the 2015 season, Elías made 22 appearances (20 starts) for Seattle, pitching 115 1/3 innings with 4.14 ERA while compiling a record of 5–8. He also made 12 starts for the Triple-A Tacoma Rainiers, with a 4–2 record and 7.34 ERA in 61 1/3 innings pitched.

Overall for the Mariners, Elías appeared in 51 MLB games (49 starts) with a 15–20 record with 3.97 ERA in 279 innings pitched.

=== Boston Red Sox ===
On December 7, 2015, the Mariners traded Elías and Carson Smith to the Boston Red Sox for Wade Miley and Jonathan Aro.

Elías made his Boston debut in relief on April 23, 2016, against the Houston Astros. In June, he was called up from the Triple-A Pawtucket Red Sox and faced his former teammates in his first starting appearance with the Red Sox on June 17, giving up seven runs over four innings. Elías was optioned back to Pawtucket after the game. He made one additional appearance for Boston during the season, pitching two innings of one-run relief against the Arizona Diamondbacks on August 16. Overall, for the 2016 season, Elías made three appearances for Boston, pitching 7 2/3 innings with a 12.91 ERA and 0–1 record.

Elías started the 2017 season on the disabled list, due to a muscle strain suffered in early March. After missing several months of the season, he played with four different Red Sox farm teams; the Single-A Lowell Spinners and Salem Red Sox, Double-A Portland Sea Dogs, and Triple-A Pawtucket. For those four teams, he pitched a total of 42 2/3 innings in 10 games with a 6.96 ERA and a 1–6 record. Late in the season, he made a single appearance for Boston, pitching 1/3 of an inning on September 4 against the Toronto Blue Jays; he walked one batter and struck out one batter.

Elías started the 2018 season with Triple-A Pawtucket, where he appeared in four games in relief, pitching a total of 7 1/3 innings with a 1.23 ERA, 1–0 record, and one save.

Overall for the Red Sox, Elías appeared in 4 MLB games (one start) with a 0–1 record with 12.38 ERA in 8 innings pitched.

=== Seattle Mariners (second stint) ===
On April 23, 2018, the Red Sox traded Elías to the Seattle Mariners in exchange for a player to be named later (PTNBL) or cash considerations. They agreed on Eric Filia as the PTBNL in June, but Filia failed his physical exam with the Red Sox, and was returned to Seattle, with the Red Sox acquiring cash considerations instead.

After reporting to Triple-A Tacoma, he went 2–4 with a 4.94 ERA (17 ER, 31.0 IP) with 27 strikeouts and 12 walks in 7 games (6 starts). On June 1, 2018, Elías was called up from Tacoma to make his season debut against the Tampa Bay Rays, in which he tossed two scoreless innings in relief, earning the win. Throughout the season, Elías was typically used as a long reliever or spot starter, finishing 2018 with a 2.65 ERA, 154 ERA+, 3.08 FIP, and 2.13 strikeout-to-walk ratio in 23 appearances (51.0 IP), including 4 starts.

Following the departure of All-Star closer Edwin Díaz in the 2018 offseason as well as an early-season injury to newly-acquired closer Hunter Strickland, Elías was used exclusively out of the bullpen especially in high leverage situations, ultimately becoming the team's new closer. In 44 games (47.0 IP) with the Mariners in 2019, he pitched to a 3.64 ERA with 14 saves. 45 strikeouts, and 17 walks.

=== Washington Nationals ===
On July 31, 2019, the Mariners traded Elías and Hunter Strickland to the Washington Nationals in exchange for Aaron Fletcher, Taylor Guilbeau, and Elvis Alvarado. Elías made his Nationals debut on August 2, 2019, recording the final two outs of the sixth inning. However, he was forced to leave the game and was placed on the 10-day injured list after he pulled his right hamstring running down the first-base line during an at-bat the following inning. In 2019 he pitched three innings for the Nationals. Between the Mariners and the Nationals combined in 2019, he was 4–2 with 14 saves and a 3.96 ERA, as in 48 relief appearances he pitched 50.0 innings. The Nationals finished the 2019 year with a 93–69 record, clinching the wild card, and eventually won the World Series over the Astros. Elias was not part of the Nationals' postseason run, but still won his first world championship. Elias was outrighted off of the Nationals 40-man roster on October 9, 2020, and elected free agency the next day.

=== Seattle Mariners (third stint) ===
On January 7, 2021, Elías signed a minor league contract with the Seattle Mariners organization. On March 16, it was announced that Elias had suffered a torn ulnar collateral ligament that required Tommy John surgery and cause him to miss the 2021 season. On March 26, Elías was released by the Mariners. On April 1, Elias re-signed with the Mariners on a new minor league contract.

On May 16, 2022, Elias was selected to the active roster. He made one relief appearance for the Mariners, allowing one earned run on one hit and two walks against the Toronto Blue Jays. On May 19, Elias was removed from the 40-man roster and returned to the Triple-A Tacoma Rainiers. On May 27, Elias was selected back to the active roster. The Mariners designated Elías for assignment on June 20. He cleared waivers and was sent outright to Triple-A Tacoma on June 23. On October 17, Elías elected free agency.

=== Chicago Cubs ===
On December 20, 2022, Elías signed a minor league contract with the Chicago Cubs. He was assigned to the Triple-A Iowa Cubs to begin the 2023 season. In 4 starts for Iowa, Elías registered a 2-0 record and 5.48 ERA with 18 strikeouts in 21 1/3 innings pitched.

=== SSG Landers ===
On May 3, 2023, Elías signed with the SSG Landers of the KBO League. In 22 games (21 starts) for the team, he registered an 8–6 record and 3.70 ERA with 93 strikeouts across 131 1/3 innings of work.

On December 17, 2023, Elías re–signed with the Landers on a one–year, $1 million contract. On May 23, 2024, after suffering an oblique injury, Elías was deactivated by the Landers, with Keisho Shirakawa signed as a temporary replacement player.

Elías finished the regular season with a 7–7 record, 4.08 ERA, and 104 strikeouts across 123 2/3 innings of work. He became a free agent following the season.

=== Fubon Guardians ===
On December 30, 2024, Elías signed a $500,000 contract with the Fubon Guardians of the Chinese Professional Baseball League. Elías made 24 starts for the Guardians in 2025, compiling an 8-12 record and 3.75 ERA with 114 strikeouts across 144 innings pitched. He became a free agent following the season.

=== Tecolotes de los Dos Laredos ===
On April 14, 2026, Elías signed with the Tecolotes de los Dos Laredos of the Mexican League. In eight appearances (including seven starts) for the team, he posted a 0–2 record with a 5.61 ERA and 23 strikeouts across 25 2/3 innings of work.

=== Algodoneros de Unión Laguna ===
On July 16, 2026, Elías, Ryan Hendrix, and Brandon Brennan were traded to the Algodoneros de Unión Laguna of the Mexican League.

== See also ==
- List of baseball players who defected from Cuba
