= Onelki García =

Cuban baseball player (born 1989)

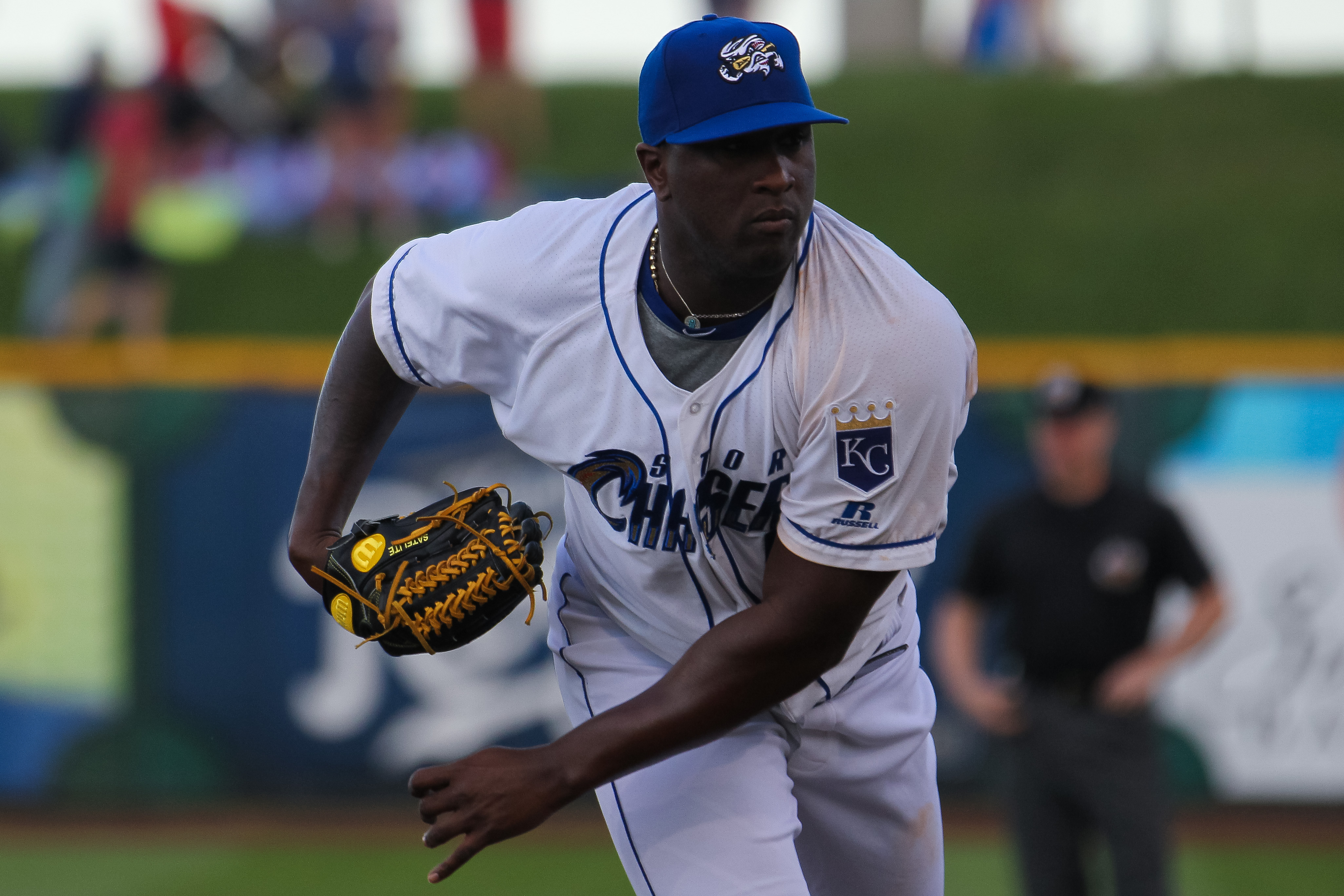
- García with the Omaha Storm Chasers in 2017

Staten Island FerryHawks
- Pitcher
- Born: August 2, 1989 (age 37); Guantánamo, Cuba
- Bats: Left Throws: Left

Professional debut
- MLB: September 11, 2013, for the Los Angeles Dodgers
- NPB: April 4, 2018, for the Chunichi Dragons

MLB statistics (through 2017 season)
- Win–loss record: 0–1
- Earned run average: 13.50
- Strikeouts: 3

NPB statistics (through 2020 season)
- Win–loss record: 21–23
- Earned run average: 3.81
- Strikeouts: 262
- Stats at Baseball Reference

Teams
- Los Angeles Dodgers (2013); Kansas City Royals (2017); Chunichi Dragons (2018); Hanshin Tigers (2019–2020)

Career highlights and awards
- NPB All-Star (2018)

Onelki García (born August 2, 1989) is a Cuban professional baseball pitcher for the Staten Island FerryHawks of the Atlantic League of Professional Baseball. He has previously played in Major League Baseball (MLB) for the Los Angeles Dodgers and Kansas City Royals, and in Nippon Professional Baseball (NPB) for the Chunichi Dragons and Hanshin Tigers.

== Career ==
=== Cuban career and defection ===
García began playing in the Cuban National Series at age 18. In three seasons for the Guantánamo team he had a 12–12 win–loss record with a 4.73 earned run average (ERA).

García defected from Cuba in August 2010 with hopes of pursuing a professional baseball career in the United States. He was originally declared eligible for the 2011 Major League Baseball draft but was ruled ineligible due to issues with his residency. A year later he was drafted by the Los Angeles Dodgers in the third round of the 2012 Major League Baseball draft.

=== Los Angeles Dodgers ===
García started his professional career with the High-A Rancho Cucamonga Quakes. He started one game, striking out four over two innings pitched. He started the 2013 season with the Double-A Chattanooga Lookouts. He was promoted to the Triple-A Albuquerque Isotopes in August 2013. Between the two levels, he was in 35 games (6 as a starter) and was 2–4 with a 2.90 ERA.

On September 11, 2013, the Dodgers purchased his contract and called him up to the Major Leagues. He made his debut that night and walked the one batter he faced against the Arizona Diamondbacks. He pitched 1 1/3 innings over three games for the Dodgers in September, and allowed two earned runs on one hit and four walks. He was the first player to wear the number 98 in Major League Baseball.

He missed all of the 2014 season after undergoing shoulder surgery in the offseason.

=== Chicago White Sox ===
On November 20, 2014, García was claimed off waivers by the Chicago White Sox. On April 3, 2015, García was removed from the 40-man roster and sent outright to the Triple-A Charlotte Knights. He split the season between the Double-A Birmingham Barons and Triple-A Charlotte Knights, posting a cumulative 4.82 ERA with 72 strikeouts and 3 saves across 38 appearances. García was released by the White Sox organization on March 21, 2016.

=== Diablos Rojos del México ===
On July 8, 2016, García signed with the Diablos Rojos del México of the Mexican League. In 14 games (3 starts) for Mexico, he posted an 0-1 record and 3.82 ERA with 30 strikeouts across 33 innings pitched. García was released by the Diablos on September 23.

=== Kansas City Royals ===
On October 21, 2016, García signed a minor league contract with the Kansas City Royals organization. On August 26, 2017, the Royals selected García's contract, adding him to their active roster. In 2 games for the Royals, he struggled to a 13.50 ERA with 2 strikeouts across 6 innings pitched. García was designated for assignment on September 12, when the team claimed Mike Morin off of waivers. He cleared waivers and was sent outright to the Triple-A Omaha Storm Chasers on September 14. On December 18, García was released to pursue a playing opportunity in Japan.

=== Chunichi Dragons ===
On December 20, 2017, García was confirmed to have signed with the Chunichi Dragons of Nippon Professional Baseball. He made 27 appearances for Chunichi in 2018, compiling a 13–9 record and 2.99 ERA with 132 strikeouts across 168 2/3 innings pitched. García was selected to the 2018 NPB All-Star game. On December 1, 2018, it was confirmed that the Dragons had released García after failing to reach an agreement over a new deal.

=== Hanshin Tigers ===
On December 17, 2018, García signed a one-year, $1.5 million contract with the Hanshin Tigers of NPB. In 21 appearances for Hanshin, he compiled a 6–8 record and 4.69 ERA with 79 strikeouts across 103 2/3 innings pitched.

On December 14, 2019, García signed a one–year extension to remain with the Tigers. He made 14 outings for the Tigers in 2020, registering a 2–6 record and 4.42 ERA with 51 strikeouts across 75 1/3 innings of work. On December 2, 2020, García became a free agent.

=== CTBC Brothers ===
On December 25, 2020, García signed a one-year, $500,000 deal with the CTBC Brothers of the Chinese Professional Baseball League. On March 15, 2021, García was released by the Brothers after failing his physical. It was discovered that after he arrived in Taiwan, he had a pre-existing shoulder and elbow injury.

=== Leones de Yucatán ===
On July 13, 2021, García signed with the Leones de Yucatán of the Mexican League. He made 6 starts for the team in 2022, struggling to a 7.03 ERA with 7 strikeouts in 24 1/3 innings pitched. García won the Mexican League Championship with the Leones in 2022. García returned to the Leones in 2023, and posted a 3–2 record with a 2.31 ERA and 32 strikeouts over 50 2/3 innings. He became a free agent following the season.

=== Charros de Jalisco ===
On May 26, 2024, García signed with the Olmecas de Tabasco of the Mexican League. However, he was traded to the Charros de Jalisco on June 20, without making an appearance for Tabasco. In 3 games for Jalisco, he posted a 5.40 ERA with 1 strikeout over 3 1/3 innings pitched. García was released by the Charros on April 30, 2025.

=== Piratas de Campeche ===
On May 14, 2025, García signed with the Piratas de Campeche of the Mexican League. In 15 appearances (seven starts) for Campeche, he went 0–2 with a 5.92 ERA, 27 strikeouts, and 25 walks across 38 innings pitched.

García made 17 appearances (two starts) for the Piratas in 2026, posting a 1–2 record with a 8.55 ERA, 18 strikeouts, and eight walks over 20 innings pitched.

=== Tigres de Quintana Roo ===
On June 24, 2026, García was traded to the Tigres de Quintana Roo of the Mexican League. In 6 games (5 starts) he threw 22.2 innings going 0-1 with a 5.56 ERA with the same amount of walks as strikeouts with 7.

=== Staten Island FerryHawks ===
On August 17, 2026, Garcia signed with the Staten Island FerryHawks of the Atlantic League of Professional Baseball.

== See also ==
- List of baseball players who defected from Cuba
