= Johnny Rodriguez (baseball) =

Baseball manager

Johnny Rodriguez was the manager for the Springfield Cardinals, a minor league baseball team, based in Springfield, Missouri. The Cardinals play in the Texas League (minor league) and are double-A affiliates of the St. Louis Cardinals.
