= Rogelio Álvarez =

Cuban baseball player (1938–2012)

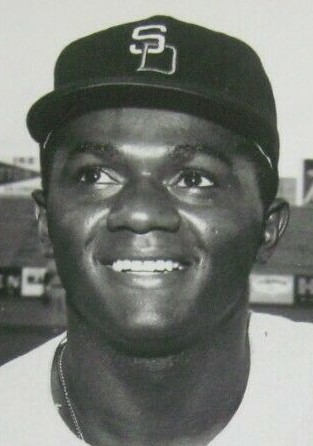
- First baseman
- Born: April 18, 1938; Pinar del Río, Cuba
- Died: November 30, 2012 (aged 74); Hialeah, Florida, U.S.
- Batted: Right Threw: Right

MLB debut
- September 18, 1960, for the Cincinnati Reds

Last MLB appearance
- September 28, 1962, for the Cincinnati Reds

MLB statistics
- Batting average: .189
- Hits: 7
- Runs batted in: 2
- Stats at Baseball Reference

Teams
- Cincinnati Reds (1960, 1962)

Rogelio Álvarez Hernández (April 18, 1938 – November 30, 2012) was a Cuban professional baseball player whose career spanned 18 seasons, including parts of two in Major League Baseball with the Cincinnati Reds (1960, 1962). Over his career in the majors, Álvarez batted .189 with two runs, seven hits and two runs batted in (RBIs). Álvarez also played in the minor leagues with the Class-C Yuma Sun Sox (1956), the Class-B Port Arthur Sea Hawks (1956), the Class-B Wenatchee Chiefs (1957), the Class-B Clovis Redlegs (1957), the Triple-A Havana Sugar Kings/Jersey City Jerseys (1958–1961), the Triple-A San Diego Padres (1962–1963, 1965), the Double-A Macon Peaches (1964), the Double-A Knoxville Smokies (1965–1967), the Triple-A Buffalo Bisons (1966), the Double-A Evansville White Sox, the Triple-A Veracruz Aguila (1968–1971), the Triple-A Poza Rica Petroleros (1972) and the Triple-A Yucatán Leones (1973). During his minor league career, he played 1,706 games. He primarily played first base over his career and occasionally played outfield and pitcher.

Álvarez was a member of the Washington Senators during spring training in 1963 and was expected to be the team's starting first baseman going into the regular season. However, Álvarez, born in Pinar del Río, Cuba, was forced to stay in his native country by the Cuban government. This made Álvarez incapable of reporting to the Senators, who trained in Pompano Beach, Florida. He left the country under unknown circumstances and joined the Pacific Coast League after the Senators returned his contract to the Reds' organization.

== Professional career ==
=== Early career: Cincinnati Reds ===
In 1956, Álvarez signed with the Cincinnati Redlegs (now known as the "Reds") as an amateur free agent. In his first professional season, he played for the Class-C Yuma Sun Sox of the Arizona–Mexico League and the Class-B Port Arthur Sea Hawks of the Big State League. That season, he batted a combined .305 with 10 doubles, 5 triples, and 5 home runs. During the following season, Álvarez split his playing time between the Class-B Wenatchee Chiefs of the Northwest League and the Class-B Clovis Redlegs of the Southwestern League. He batted a combined .325 with 24 doubles, 7 triples, and 39 home runs. Despite only appearing in 48 games in the Southwestern League, Álvarez finished the season third in the league in home runs with 24.

In 1958, Álvarez played for the Triple-A Havana Sugar Kings of the International League. In 146 games, Álvarez batted .268 with 67 runs, 130 hits, 23 doubles, five triples, 25 home runs and 88 runs batted in (RBIs). Along with Bob Lennon, Álvarez was fourth in the International League in home runs that year. He was also fifth in RBIs. Álvarez continued playing with the Triple-A Havana Sugar Kings in 1959. That season, he batted .196 with 51 runs, 99 hits, 19 doubles, one triple, 22 home runs and 65 RBIs. Álvarez was second to last in batting average in the International League; however, he was tied for eighth with Luke Easter in home runs. In 1960, Álvarez continued playing with the Havana until their move to Jersey City under the name the "Jerseys" after Fidel Castro rose to power in Cuba. With the team, he batted .254 with 134 hits, 20 doubles, one triple, 17 home runs and 72 RBIs in 151 games.

On September 18, 1960, Álvarez debuted in Major League Baseball after being called up by the Reds. In his first game, Álvarez struck out in one at-bat against the Pittsburgh Pirates. His first and only major league hit of the season came in his third game. In his three major games that season, Álvarez batted .111 with one run and one hit in three games. During the 1961 season, Álvarez played with the Triple-A Jersey City Jerseys. In 140 games that season, he batted .228 with 56 runs, 101 hits, 13 doubles, six triples, 12 home runs and 58 RBIs. In 1962, Álvarez started at the Triple-A level with the San Diego Padres of the Pacific Coast League (PCL). With the Padres, he batted .318 with 88 runs, 153 hits, 27 doubles, five triples, 18 home runs and 73 RBIs in 132 games. In September 1962, it was announced that Álvarez made the PCL all-star team. He was seventh in the PCL in batting average that season.

The Reds purchased Álvarez in September of the 1962 season after playing with the San Diego Padres in their minor league organization. His call-up to the majors was due to an injury to the Reds' first baseman Gordy Coleman. His first major league hit of the season came on September 9 against the St. Louis Cardinals. His first major league RBI came on September 14, against the New York Mets. Álvarez made his final major league appearance on September 28, against the Philadelphia Phillies, striking out in one at-bat. On the season with the Reds, Álvarez batted .241 with one run, six hits and two RBIs in 14 games.

=== Later career ===
In November 1962, the Cincinnati Reds traded Álvarez to the Washington Senators for first baseman Harry Bright. Going into the season, Mickey Vernon, manager of the Senators at the time, said that Álvarez was poised to play first base in the majors that season with Washington. During spring training in 1963, Álvarez was barred from leaving his native Cuba, making it impossible for him to report to the Senators. The Mexican government was involved in helping Álvarez leave Cuba to return to the United States. Tom Brown replaced Álvarez on the Senators' roster while he was in Cuba. On May 10, 1963, it was reported that Álvarez left Cuba and returned to his baseball career. Álvarez, who did not comment on how he returned from Cuba, was sold by the Senators to the Triple-A San Diego Padres after his return. That season with the Padres, Álvarez batted .259 with 51 runs, 95 hits, 19 doubles, two triples, 15 home runs and 63 RBIs in 103 games.

Álvarez joined the Double-A Macon Peaches of the Southern League in 1964. With the Peaches, he batted .271 with 16 runs, 39 hits, seven doubles, 10 home runs and 42 RBIs in 56 games. Álvarez split the 1965 season between the Triple-A San Diego Padres and the Double-A Knoxville Smokies. He batted a combined .233 with 27 runs, 70 hits, 10 doubles, 16 home runs and 50 RBIs in 111 games. In 1967, Álvarez started the season with the Double-A Smokies batting .312 with 56 runs, 115 hits, 20 doubles, one triple, 27 home runs and 78 RBIs in 114 games. He was second amongst Southern League batters in home runs, fifth in batting average and sixth in RBIs. Álvarez split the 1967 season between the Double-A Knoxville Smokies and the Double-A Evansville White Sox. Between the two Southern League teams, he batted .240 with 46 runs, 110 hits, 21 doubles, one triple, 19 home runs and 84 RBIs in 133 games. In 1968, Álvarez joined the Triple-A Veracruz Aguila of the Mexican League. He played with Veracruz for the next four seasons before joining the Poza Rica Petroleros, also of the Mexican League, in 1972. Álvarez spent his final season in professional baseball in 1973 with the Mexican League Yucatán Leones.

== See also ==
- List of baseball players who defected from Cuba
