= Miguel Alfredo González =

Cuban baseball player (1983-2017)

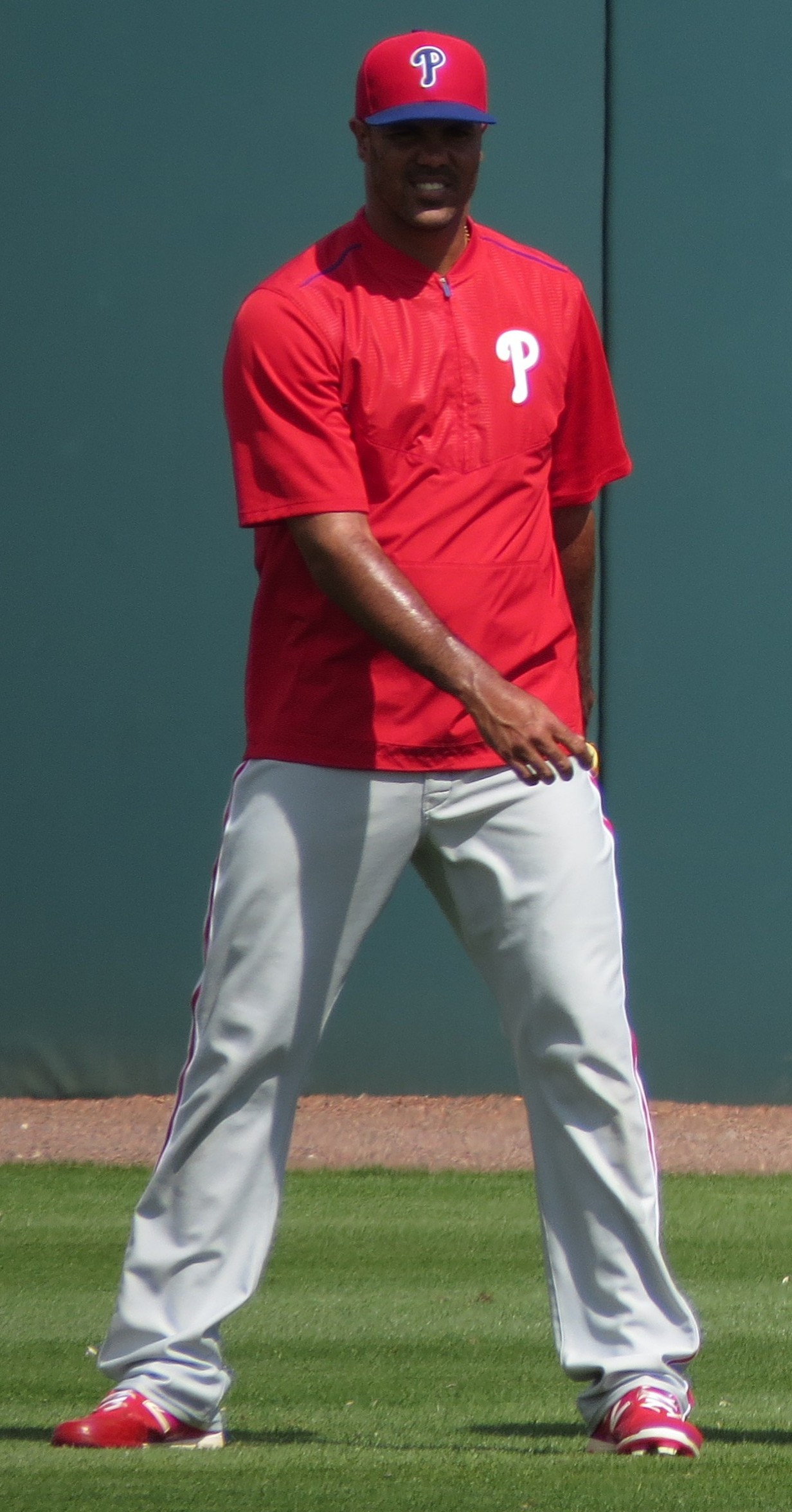
- González in 2015 spring training
- Pitcher
- Born: September 23, 1983; Havana, Cuba
- Died: November 23, 2017 (aged 34); Havana, Cuba
- Batted: Right Threw: Right

MLB debut
- September 3, 2014, for the Philadelphia Phillies

Last MLB appearance
- September 27, 2014, for the Philadelphia Phillies

MLB statistics
- Win–loss record: 0–1
- Earned run average: 6.75
- Strikeouts: 5
- Stats at Baseball Reference

Teams
- Philadelphia Phillies (2014)

Miguel Alfredo González Puebla (September 23, 1983 – November 23, 2017) was a Cuban professional baseball pitcher. He played in the Cuban National Series, for the Cuban national baseball team, and in 2014 for the Philadelphia Phillies of Major League Baseball (MLB).

== Professional career ==
=== Cuban baseball career ===
González pitched for La Habana in the Cuban National Series from 2007 through 2009. He played for the Cuba national baseball team in the 2009 World Port Tournament and 2009 and 2011 Baseball World Cups. He was playing for the Artemisa team when he was caught trying to defect in January 2012 and he was suspended from playing in the league at that point. He succeeded in defecting from Cuba to El Salvador in 2013, and then moved to Mexico.

=== American baseball career ===
González pitched in some games for the Toros de Tijuana of the Liga Norte de México as a showcase for American scouts, including those from the Los Angeles Dodgers, Boston Red Sox and Chicago Cubs. On July 26, 2013, stories in the press reported that González agreed to a six-year contract with the Philadelphia Phillies, worth $60 million. However, the Phillies never confirmed the report and subsequent reports mentioned that the deal might not happen. On August 30, 2013, the Phillies announced they had signed González to a three-year, $12 million contract with a vesting option for 2017.

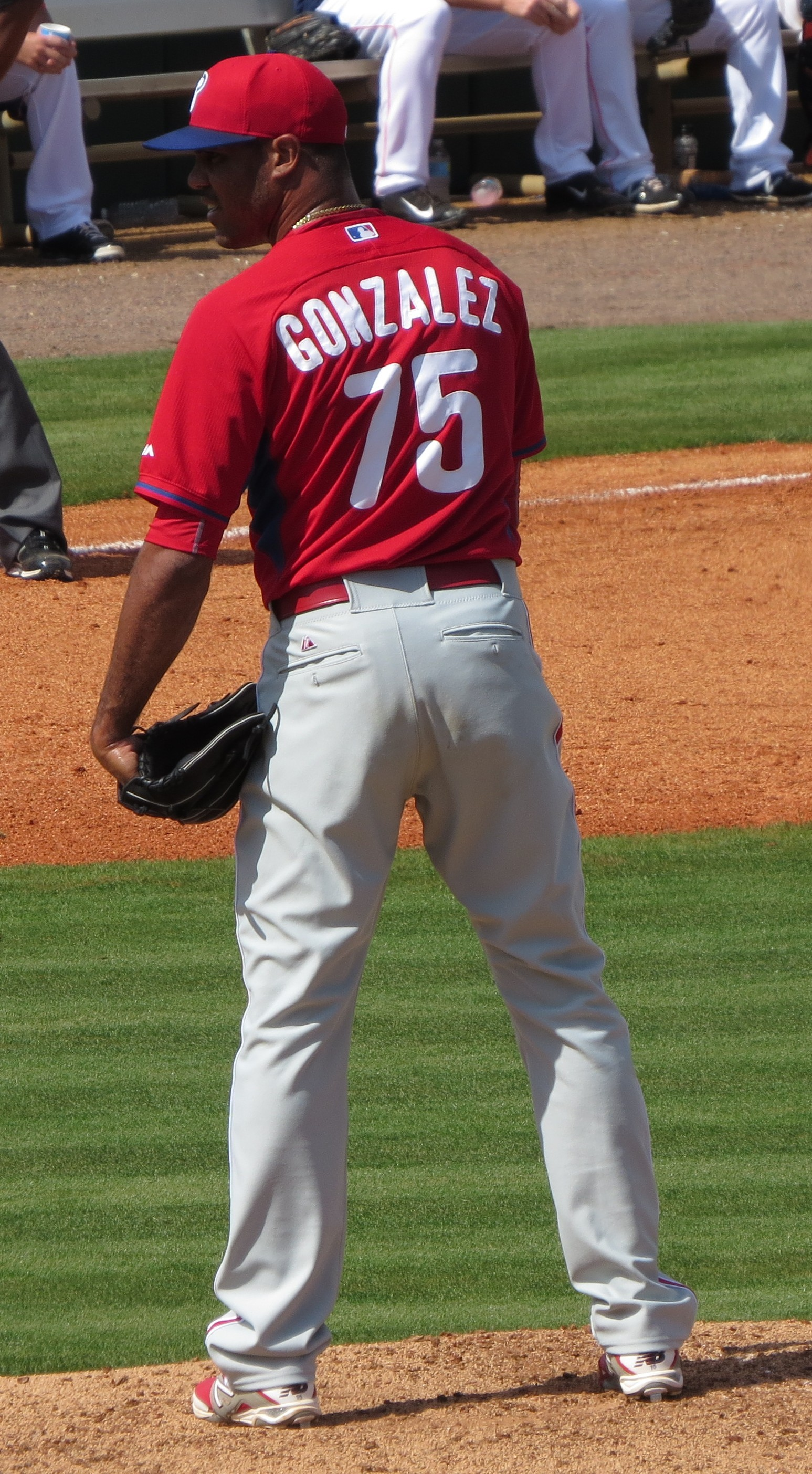
González pitching for the Philadelphia Phillies in 2015 Spring Training

Entering spring training, it was still unknown whether he would be a member of the big league starting rotation, bullpen, or whether he would start the season with the Phillies Class AAA affiliate, the Lehigh Valley IronPigs. Ultimately, he opened the season on the 60-day disabled list (DL) "after not exactly impressing in a poor spring"; the official reason for his placement on the DL was "right shoulder tendinitis". Upon returning from injury, Gonzalez ascended through the Phillies' minor league system on a rehab assignment, compiling 54 strikeouts in 46 1/3 innings pitched. Used primarily out of the bullpen in his rehab stint, Gonzalez completed his minor league assignment with a 3.11 earned run average (ERA) and .231 opponent batting average. Deemed healthy and ready to begin his MLB career, Gonzalez was activated and assigned to the Phillies on September 2 as part of the roster expansion call-ups. He recorded a 6.75 ERA in 5 1/3 innings pitched in the major leagues.

A poor spring training in 2015 led to the Phillies outrighting González to the minor leagues and removing him from the 40-man roster. He was released by the Phillies on April 1, 2016.

== Death ==
González was killed in a traffic accident in Havana, Cuba, on November 23, 2017.

== See also ==
- List of baseball players who defected from Cuba
- List of baseball players who died during their careers
