= Abraham Núñez (outfielder) =

Dominican baseball player (born 1977)

Abraham Nunez
- Outfielder
- Born: February 5, 1977 (age 48); Bajos de Haina, Dominican Republic
- Batted: Switch Threw: Right

MLB debut
- September 3, 2002, for the Florida Marlins

Last MLB appearance
- October 3, 2004, for the Kansas City Royals

MLB statistics
- Batting average: .209
- Home runs: 6
- Runs batted in: 35

CPBL statistics
- Batting average: .268
- Home runs: 3
- Runs batted in: 19
- Stats at Baseball Reference

Teams
- Florida Marlins (2002, 2004); Kansas City Royals (2004); Chinatrust Whales (2008)

Abraham Núñez (born February 5, 1977) is a Dominican former Major League Baseball outfielder. He has played in MLB for the Florida Marlins (2002, 2004) and Kansas City Royals (2004). He is a switch-hitter and throws right-handed. Nunez played for the Washington Nationals Triple-A affiliate Columbus Clippers in 2007. In 2008, he played for the CPBL's Chinatrust Whales.

In two major league seasons, Núñez was a .209 hitter with six home runs and 35 RBI in 136 games played.

In May 2006, while playing with the minor league Fresno Grizzlies, Núñez was suspended 50 games for testing positive for use of a performance-enhancing substance. He last played for the Caffè Danesi Nettuno of Italy's Serie A1 in 2009.
