= Hansel Izquierdo =

Cuban baseball player (born 1977)

- Pitcher
- Born: January 2, 1977 (age 49); Havana, Cuba
- Batted: Right Threw: Right

MLB debut
- April 21, 2002, for the Florida Marlins

Last MLB appearance
- June 24, 2002, for the Florida Marlins

MLB statistics
- Win–loss record: 2–0
- Earned run average: 4.55
- Strikeouts: 20

CPBL statistics
- Win–loss record: 2–5
- Earned run average: 4.00
- Strikeouts: 41
- Stats at Baseball Reference

Teams
- Florida Marlins (2002); Uni-President Lions (2006)

Hansel Izquierdo (born January 2, 1977) is a Cuban former Major League Baseball pitcher. He played during one season at the major league level for the Florida Marlins. He was drafted by the Marlins in the 7th round of the 1995 amateur draft. Izquierdo played his first professional season with their Rookie league GCL Marlins in 1995, and split his last season between the Pittsburgh Pirates' Double-A (Altoona Curve) and Triple-A (Indianapolis Indians) clubs in 2005. Izquierdo played for the Tecolotes de Nuevo Laredo of the Mexican League in 2010.

Hansel is married to Annia Izquierdo and has four children, one from a previous relationship. He graduated from Southwest Miami High School. He currently resides in Miami, Florida, with his wife and three children.

== See also ==
- List of baseball players who defected from Cuba
