= 2026 Boston Hunters season =

2026 Boston Hunters
- League: Women's Pro Baseball League
- Ballpark: Robin Roberts Stadium
- City: Springfield, Illinois (representing Boston, Massachusetts)
- Record: 4–11 (.267)
- League place: 4th
- Manager: Keith Foulke (fired August 9); Jemile Weeks
- Television: ESPN+

The 2026 Boston Hunters season was the inaugural season of the Boston Hunters in the Women's Pro Baseball League (WPBL). They finished with a 4–11 record, finishing in last place. All WPBL teams played in the postseason, though it was to no avail as they were swept in the first round, losing their semifinal series to the San Francisco Firebells.

== Draft ==
For the inaugural season, each WPBL team drafted 30 players, signing 15 of those players. The draft occurred on November 20, 2025, virtually on YouTube.

Key
*	Player later signed by team
+	Player signed but did not play
#	Player not signed by team

Rnd	Pick	Player	Position	Hometown
1	4	Hyeonah Kim	Catcher	(South Korea) Seoul
1	5	Alli Schroder	Pitcher	(Canada) Fruitvale, British Columbia
1	12	Raine Padgham	Pitcher	(Canada) Abbotsford, British Columbia
1	20	Lexi Hastings	Left fielder	(United States) Holly Springs, North Carolina
2	21	Kate Blunt	Shortstop	(United States) Ladera Ranch, California
2	28	Denver Bryant	Second baseman	(United States) Albany, Georgia
2	29	Ticara Geldenhuis	Outfielder	(Australia) Waterfall, New South Wales
2	36	Suzuka Yamamoto	Shortstop	(Japan) Setouchi, Okayama
2	37	Maïka Dumais	Pitcher	(Canada) Quebec City, Quebec
3	44	Gigi Schiano	Pitcher	(United States) Berrysburg, Pennsylvania
3	45	Maria José Valenzuela ^{+}	Infielder	(Mexico) Hermosillo, Sonora
3	52	Molly Paddison	Center fielder	(Australia) Pullenvale, Queensland
3	53	Beth Greenwood	Catcher	(United States) Amherst, New Hampshire
3	60	Sabrina Robinson	First baseman	(United States) Morristown, New Jersey
4	61	Gabrielle Haas *	Shortstop	(United States) Palm Beach Gardens, Florida
4	68	Paloma Benach *	Pitcher	(United States) Washington, D.C.
4	69	Stephanie Everett ^{#}	Left fielder	(United States) Silver Spring, Maryland
4	76	Luciana Moreno ^{#}	Infielder	(United States) Sun Prairie, Wisconsin
4	77	Allie Bebbere ^{#}	Pitcher	(Australia) Montmorency, Victoria
5	84	Emily Baxter ^{#}	Outfielder	(Canada) Oakville, Ontario
5	85	Braidy Birdsall ^{#}	Second baseman	(Canada) Saskatoon, Saskatchewan
5	91	Edith De Leija	Third baseman	(Mexico) Aldama, Tamaulipas
5	92	Meaghan Houk ^{#}	Infielder	(United States) Ravena, New York
5	93	Laura Hirai ^{#}	Pitcher	(United Kingdom) London, England
5	100	Olivia Bricker *	Pitcher	(United States) Cincinnati, Ohio
6	101	Sadie Zion ^{#}	First baseman	(United States) Danbury, Connecticut
6	108	Nadia Diaz ^{#}	Third baseman	(United States) Cicero, New York
6	109	Nylah Ramirez ^{#}	Pitcher	(United States) Brooklyn, New York
6	116	Clara Rice ^{#}	Catcher	(United States) Bethesda, Maryland
6	117	Mary Grace O'Neill ^{#}	Center fielder	(United States) Pleasantville, New York

== Regular season ==
=== Season standings ===
Women's Pro Baseball League
Team	W	L	Pct.	GB	Home	Road
San Francisco Firebells	10	5	.667	—	6‍–‍2	4‍–‍3
New York Heights	8	7	.533	2	2‍–‍5	6‍–‍2
Los Angeles Queens	8	7	.533	2	5‍–‍2	3‍–‍5
Boston Hunters	4	11	.267	6	1‍–‍7	3‍–‍4

=== Record vs. opponents ===
2026 Women's Pro Baseball League record Source: WPBL Schedule
Team	BOS	LA	NY	SF
Boston	—	1–4	3–2	0–5
Los Angeles	4–1	—	2–3	2–3
New York	2–3	3–2	—	3–2
San Francisco	5–0	3–2	2–3	—

Updated with the results of all games through September 6, 2026.

=== Game log ===
Legend
Hunters Win	Hunters Loss	Game Postponed
Bold = Heights team member

2026 Game Log
Overall: 4–11 (Home: 1–7; Away: 3–4)
August: 4–8 (Home: 1–5; Away: 3–3)

#	Date	Opponent	Score	Win	Loss	Save	Location	Record
1	August 2	Firebells	L 3–11	Eckert (1–0)	**Padgham** (0–1)	–	**Robin Roberts Stadium**	0–1
2	August 5	@ Queens	L 4–12	Roche (1–0)	**Schroder** (0–1)	–	Robin Roberts Stadium	0–2
3	August 8	@ Heights	W 9–6	**Dumais** (1–0)	Izumi (0–1)	–	Robin Roberts Stadium	1–2
4	August 9	Heights	L 6–7 (8)	O'Sullivan (1–0)	**Blunt** (0–1)	–	**Robin Roberts Stadium**	1–3
5	August 13	@ Heights	W 6–1	**Bricker** (1–0)	Eccles (0–1)	–	Robin Roberts Stadium	2–3
6	August 15	Queens	L 3–13	Roche (2–1)	**Padgham** (0–2)	–	**Robin Roberts Stadium**	2–4
7	August 16	@ Heights	W 9–7	**Schiano** (1–0)	Zettlemoyer (0–1)	–	Robin Roberts Stadium	3–4
8	August 20	Heights	L 4–9	Lee (2–1)	**Bricker** (1–1)	–	Robin Roberts Stadium	3–5
9	August 22	Firebells	L 5–12	Gilder (2–1)	**Benach** (0–1)	–	**Robin Roberts Stadium**	3–6
10	August 23	Queens	W 7–3	**Blunt** (1–1)	Shimano (0–1)	–	**Robin Roberts Stadium**	4–6
11	August 26	@ Queens	L 6–8	Villarreal (1–0)	**Schroder** (0–2)	–	Robin Roberts Stadium	4–7
12	August 28	@ Firebells	L 6–14	Whitmore (2–1)	**Schroder** (0–3)	–	Robin Roberts Stadium	4–8

September: 0–3 (Home: 0–2; Away: 0–1)

#	Date	Opponent	Score	Win	Loss	Save	Location	Record
13	September 2	Firebells	L 5–8	Whitmore (3–1)	**Blunt** (1–2)	–	**Robin Roberts Stadium**	4–9
14	September 5	Queens	L 6–10	Roche (3–1)	**Schroder** (0–4)	–	**Robin Roberts Stadium**	4–10
15	September 6	@ Firebells	L 7–13	Eckert (2–0)	**Dumais** (1–1)	–	Robin Roberts Stadium	4–11

== Postseason ==
=== Postseason game log ===
2026 Postseason Game Log: 0–2 (Home: 0–1; Away: 0–1)
Semifinals: 0–2 (Home: 0–1; Away: 0–1)

#	Date	Opponent	Score	Win	Loss	Save	Location	Record
1	September 9	@ Firebells	L 4–6	Whitmore (1–0)	Blunt (0–1)	–	Robin Roberts Stadium	0–1
2	September 11	Firebells	L 6–9	Eckert (1–0)	Benach (0–1)	–	Robin Roberts Stadium	0–2

== Current roster ==
Boston Hunters roster
Active roster	Coaching staff
Pitchers: -- (Australia) Allie Bebbere; 12 (United States) Paloma Benach; -- (United States) Olivia Bricker; 18 (Canada) Maïka Dumais; -- (United Kingdom) Laura Hirai; 3 (Canada) Raine Padgham; -- (United States) Nylah Ramirez; 31 (United States) Gigi Schiano; 16 (Canada) Alli Schroder; Catchers: 17 (United States) Beth Greenwood; 7 (South Korea) Hyeonah Kim; -- (United States) Clara Rice; Infielders: -- (Canada) Braidy Birdsall; 4 (United States) Kate Blunt; 2 (United States) Denver Bryant; 25 (Mexico) Edith De Leija; -- (United States) Nadia Diaz; 33 (United States) Gabrielle Haas; -- (United States) Meaghan Houk; 30 (Mexico) Maria José Valenzuela; -- (United States) Luciana Moreno; 22 (United States) Sabrina Robinson; 5 (Japan) Suzuka Yamamoto; -- (United States) Sadie Zion; Outfielders: -- (Canada) Emily Baxter; -- (United States) Stephanie Everett; 13 (Australia) Ticara Geldenhuis; 14 (United States) Lexi Hastings; -- (United States) Mary Grace O'Neill; 55 (Australia) Molly Paddison	Manager: -- Jemile Weeks; Coaches: 6 Karavin Dew; 17 Beth Greenwood; Roster updated August 15, 2026: Disabled list; ‡ Inactive list; § Suspended list

== Player statistics ==
Updated as of 6 September 2026

=== Batting ===
= Indicates team leader in category (Note: To qualify as a team leader in AVG, OBP, SLG, or OPS, a player must have 3.1 plate appearances per team game.)

= Indicates league leader

Note: G = Games played; AB = At bats; R = Runs; H = Hits; 2B = Doubles; 3B = Triples; HR = Home runs; RBI = Runs batted in; SB = Stolen bases; CS = Caught stealing; BB = Walks; SO = Strikeouts; AVG = Batting average; OBP = On-base percentage; SLG = Slugging percentage; OPS = On-base plus slugging

Player	G	AB	R	H	2B	3B	HR	RBI	SB	CS	BB	SO	AVG	OBP	SLG	OPS
Molly Paddison	15	51	7	13	2	0	0	3	1	0	6	10	.255	.345	.294	.639
Ticara Geldenhuis	15	44	11	11	5	0	2	8	1	0	10	11	.250	.400	.500	.900
Denver Bryant	14	44	10	14	1	0	1	9	4	0	7	5	.318	.412	.409	.821
Raine Padgham	14	36	6	6	0	0	0	8	3	0	6	9	.167	.286	.167	.452
Edith De Leija	10	35	4	9	1	0	0	5	2	0	5	5	.257	.357	.286	.643
Gabrielle Haas	12	33	3	8	1	0	0	6	0	1	4	6	.242	.359	.273	.632
Lexi Hastings	12	30	12	12	4	0	3	7	6	1	9	7	.400	.550	.833	1.383
Kate Blunt	14	33	6	7	1	0	0	2	0	0	6	3	.212	.333	.242	.576
Maïka Dumais	14	25	7	5	1	0	0	4	5	0	6	5	.200	.355	.240	.595
Hyeonah Kim	11	20	8	4	2	0	0	1	1	0	3	5	.200	.429	.300	.729
Beth Greenwood	9	23	1	6	0	0	0	5	0	0	2	2	.261	.370	.261	.631
Suzuka Yamamoto	8	17	1	8	2	0	0	3	2	2	3	3	.471	.571	.588	1.160
Alli Schroder	12	17	7	7	2	0	1	6	1	0	3	4	.412	.524	.706	1.230
Sabrina Robinson	9	7	3	1	0	0	0	1	0	0	4	3	.143	.417	.143	.560
Paloma Benach	6	1	0	0	0	0	0	0	0	0	0	1	.000	.000	.000	.000
Team totals	15	416	86	111	22	0	7	68	26	4	74	79	.267	.394	.370	.765
Rank in 4 WPBL teams	—	4	4	4	3	1	4	4	2	2	1	1	4	4	4	4

Source: Baseball Reference

=== Pitching ===
= Indicates team leader in category (Note: To qualify as a team leader in ERA or WHIP, a player must have 1.0 IP per team game.)

= Indicates league leader

Note: W = Wins; L = Losses; ERA = Earned run average; G = Games pitched; GS = Games started; SV = Saves; IP = Innings pitched; H = Hits allowed; R = Runs allowed; ER = Earned runs allowed; HR = Home runs allowed; BB = Walks allowed (bases on balls); SO = Strikeouts; HBP = Hit by pitch; WHIP = Walks + hits per inning pitched

Player	W	L	ERA	G	GS	SV	IP	H	R	ER	HR	BB	SO	HBP	WHIP
Gigi Schiano	1	0	4.73	9	2	0	26.2	33	21	18	2	19	10	4	1.950
Alli Schroder	0	4	9.38	7	5	0	15.2	32	29	21	2	15	11	3	3.000
Kate Blunt	1	2	3.50	6	3	0	14.0	23	15	7	1	11	8	1	2.429
Paloma Benach	0	1	3.50	5	2	0	14.0	25	17	7	3	7	3	0	2.286
Maïka Dumais	1	1	7.17	8	0	0	13.2	22	19	14	1	13	10	7	2.561
Olivia Bricker	1	1	9.63	6	1	0	8.0	15	12	11	1	4	0	1	2.375
Raine Padgham	0	2	17.35	3	2	0	7.3	20	20	19	3	5	7	4	3.261
Denver Bryant	0	0	3.00	1	0	0	2.1	2	1	1	0	3	1	1	2.143
Team totals	4	11	6.73	15	15	0	102	172	134	98	13	77	50	21	2.441
Rank in 4 WPBL teams	4	1	4	—	—	1	2	1	1	1	3	1	4	2	4

Source: Baseball Reference (WPBL for ERA)
