= 2025 Women's Pro Baseball League draft =

Women's Pro Baseball League draft

General information
- Sport: Baseball
- Date: November 20, 2025
- Network: YouTube
- Sponsored by: New Era

Overview
- 120 total selections in 6 rounds
- League: Women's Pro Baseball League
- First selection: Kelsie Whitmore; San Francisco Firebells
- First round selections: 20

The 2025 Women's Pro Baseball League draft was the first edition of the Women's Pro Baseball League (WPBL) annual draft, taking place on November 20, 2025, virtually on YouTube. The draft assigned players from across 10 countries to WPBL teams. The draft created the rosters for the 2026 Women's Pro Baseball League season.

The process for the draft began with tryouts on August 22–26, 2025, with over 600 women across 10 countries trying out over four days. The final day of tryouts, which featured two seven-inning scrimmages, took place at Nationals Park, the home of the Washington Nationals of Major League Baseball. 150 players were selected for final consideration from tryouts, video submissions, and some were scouted by the league, for the November draft, to fill 120 draft picks.

The draft was organized to have six rounds, with 20 picks total per round, and five picks for each of four teams in each round, in a snake style format. The draft order, selected by the WPBL's law firm, was selected as the San Francisco Firebells, Los Angeles Queens, New York Heights, and Boston Hunters. No player was guaranteed a roster spot or contract. In total, each team initially drafted 15 players to their active roster.

== Draft selections ==
Key
*	Player later signed by team
+	Player signed but did not play
#	Player not signed by team

Rnd	Pick	Player	Team	Position	Hometown
1	1	Kelsie Whitmore	San Francisco Firebells	Pitcher	(United States) San Diego, California
1	2	Ayami Sato	Los Angeles Queens	Pitcher	(Japan) Tokorozawa, Saitama
1	3	Kylee Lahners	New York Heights	Third baseman	(United States) Pinehurst, North Carolina
1	4	Hyeonah Kim	Boston Hunters	Catcher	(South Korea) Seoul
1	5	Alli Schroder	Boston Hunters	Pitcher	(Canada) Fruitvale, British Columbia
1	6	Denae Benites	New York Heights	Catcher	(United States) Las Vegas, Nevada
1	7	Ashton Lansdell	Los Angeles Queens	Third baseman	(United States) Marietta, Georgia
1	8	Amanda Gianelloni	San Francisco Firebells	Second baseman	(United States) New Orleans, Louisiana
1	9	Joely Leguizamon	San Francisco Firebells	Shortstop	(United States) Jacksonville, Florida
1	10	Mo'ne Davis	Los Angeles Queens	Center fielder	(United States) Philadelphia, Pennsylvania
1	11	Rakyung Kim	New York Heights	Pitcher	(South Korea) Seoul
1	12	Raine Padgham	Boston Hunters	Pitcher	(Canada) Abbotsford, British Columbia
1	13	Valerie Perez	New York Heights	Shortstop	(United States) Corpus Christi, Texas
1	14	Jaida Lee	New York Heights	Pitcher	(Canada) St. John's, Newfoundland
1	15	Meggie Meidlinger	Los Angeles Queens	Pitcher	(United States) Sterling, Virginia
1	16	Jill Albayati	San Francisco Firebells	Pitcher, Utility player	(United States) Anaheim, California
1	17	Samantha Gutierrez	San Francisco Firebells	Catcher	(United States) San Diego, California
1	18	Tháima Maximiliana	Los Angeles Queens	Shortstop	Curaçao
1	19	London Studer	New York Heights	First baseman	(United States) Gahanna, Ohio
1	20	Lexi Hastings	Boston Hunters	Left fielder	(United States) Holly Springs, North Carolina
2	21	Kate Blunt	Boston Hunters	Shortstop	(United States) Ladera Ranch, California
2	22	Keira Izumi	New York Heights	Shortstop	(United States) San Diego, California
2	23	Jamie Mackay	Los Angeles Queens	Catcher	(United States) Laguna Beach, California
2	24	Ayaka Yamamoto	San Francisco Firebells	Third baseman	(Japan) Fukuyama, Hiroshima
2	25	Niki Eckert	San Francisco Firebells	Pitcher	(United States) Englewood, New Jersey
2	26	Emi Saiki	Los Angeles Queens	Shortstop	(Japan) Kagawa
2	27	Natsuki Yonetani	New York Heights	Left fielder	(Japan) Saitama, Saitama
2	28	Denver Bryant	Boston Hunters	Second baseman	(United States) Albany, Georgia
2	29	Ticara Geldenhuis	Boston Hunters	Outfielder	(Australia) Waterfall, New South Wales
2	30	Alyssa Zettlemoyer	New York Heights	Catcher	(United States) Murrieta, California
2	31	Samaria Benítez	Los Angeles Queens	Shortstop	(Mexico) Nayarit
2	32	Andréanne Leblanc	San Francisco Firebells	First baseman	(Canada) Mont-Saint-Hilaire, Quebec
2	33	Jua Park	San Francisco Firebells	Shortstop	(South Korea) Hadong, South Gyeongsang
2	34	Maggie Foxx	Los Angeles Queens	Catcher	(United States) Bedford, New Hampshire
2	35	Madison Willan	New York Heights	Infielder	(Canada) Edmonton, Alberta
2	36	Suzuka Yamamoto	Boston Hunters	Shortstop	(Japan) Setouchi, Okayama
2	37	Maïka Dumais	Boston Hunters	Pitcher	(Canada) Quebec City, Quebec
2	38	Claire Eccles	New York Heights	Center fielder	(Canada) Vancouver, British Columbia
2	39	Michelle Roche	Los Angeles Queens	Pitcher	(Canada) Burnaby, British Columbia
2	40	Alexia Jorge	San Francisco Firebells	Catcher	(United States) Lyndhurst, New Jersey
3	41	Ela Day-Bédard	San Francisco Firebells	Infielder	(Canada) Gatineau, Quebec
3	42	Suzu Narasaki	Los Angeles Queens	Center fielder	(Japan) Setouchi, Okayama
3	43	Elodie Ciamarro	New York Heights	Catcher	(Canada) Mont-Saint-Hilaire, Quebec
3	44	Gigi Schiano	Boston Hunters	Pitcher	(United States) Berrysburg, Pennsylvania
3	45	Maria José Valenzuela ^{+}	Boston Hunters	Infielder	(Mexico) Hermosillo, Sonora
3	46	Jacqui Reynolds	New York Heights	Pitcher	(United States) Woburn, Massachusetts
3	47	Caitlin Eynon	Los Angeles Queens	Shortstop	Perth, Western Australia
3	48	Rosi del Castillo	San Francisco Firebells	Center fielder	(Mexico) Puebla, Puebla
3	49	Liz Gilder	San Francisco Firebells	Pitcher	(Canada) Port Moody, British Columbia
3	50	Sarah Edwards	Los Angeles Queens	First baseman	(United States) Bay Shore, New York
3	51	Diana Ibarra	New York Heights	Center fielder	(Mexico) Tepatitlán, Jalisco
3	52	Molly Paddison	Boston Hunters	Center fielder	(Australia) Pullenvale, Queensland
3	53	Beth Greenwood	Boston Hunters	Catcher	(United States) Amherst, New Hampshire
3	54	Claire O'Sullivan	New York Heights	Pitcher	(Australia) Maroubra, New South Wales
3	55	Brittany Apgar	Los Angeles Queens	Center fielder	(United States) Greensboro, North Carolina
3	56	Skylar Kaplan	San Francisco Firebells	Left fielder	(United States) Glen Burnie, Maryland
3	57	Hinano Beppu	San Francisco Firebells	Second baseman	(Japan) Nakagawa, Fukuoka
3	58	Autumn Mills ^{#}	Los Angeles Queens	Pitcher	(Canada) Burlington, Ontario
3	59	McKenna Huff ^{#}	New York Heights	Shortstop	(United States) Fairfax, Virginia
3	60	Sabrina Robinson	Boston Hunters	First baseman	(United States) Morristown, New Jersey
4	61	Gabrielle Haas *	Boston Hunters	Shortstop	(United States) Palm Beach Gardens, Florida
4	62	Maddison Erwin ^{#}	New York Heights	Pitcher	(Australia) Canberra
4	63	Leah Cornish ^{#}	Los Angeles Queens	Catcher	Perth, Western Australia
4	64	Jordan Eyster *	San Francisco Firebells	Center fielder	(United States) Royal Oak, Michigan
4	65	Katie Reynolds ^{#}	San Francisco Firebells	Pitcher	(United States) Watertown, Massachusetts
4	66	Juliette Kladko ^{#}	Los Angeles Queens	Pitcher	(Canada) Vancouver, British Columbia
4	67	Angelis Rivera ^{#}	New York Heights	Pitcher	(Puerto Rico) Juncos
4	68	Paloma Benach *	Boston Hunters	Pitcher	(United States) Washington, D.C.
4	69	Stephanie Everett ^{#}	Boston Hunters	Left fielder	(United States) Silver Spring, Maryland
4	70	Rocio Barajas ^{#}	New York Heights	Pitcher	(Mexico) Puerto Vallarta, Jalisco
4	71	Amira Hondras *	Los Angeles Queens	Second baseman	(United States) Chicago, Illinois
4	72	Peyton Coria *	San Francisco Firebells	Pitcher	(United States) Perris, California
4	73	Hanna Miura ^{#}	San Francisco Firebells	Second baseman	(Japan) Sapporo, Hokkaido
4	74	Sydney Barry ^{#}	Los Angeles Queens	Pitcher	(Canada) Fort Mcmurray, Alberta
4	75	Nicole Rivera-Moats ^{#}	New York Heights	Second baseman	(Puerto Rico) Juncos
4	76	Luciana Moreno ^{#}	Boston Hunters	Infielder	(United States) Sun Prairie, Wisconsin
4	77	Allie Bebbere ^{#}	Boston Hunters	Pitcher	(Australia) Montmorency, Victoria
4	78	Katherine Murphy *	New York Heights	Left fielder	(United States) Belmont, Massachusetts
4	79	Rio Obitsu ^{#}	Los Angeles Queens	Second baseman	(Japan) Saitama, Saitama
4	80	Kaija Bazzano ^{#}	San Francisco Firebells	Shortstop	(United States) Sebastopol, California
5	81	Kaelei Kajitani ^{#}	San Francisco Firebells	First baseman	(United States) Madera, California
5	82	Isabella Villarreal *	Los Angeles Queens	Second baseman	(United States) Newport, Michigan
5	83	Zoe Falardeau ^{#}	New York Heights	Pitcher	(Canada) Welland, Ontario
5	84	Emily Baxter ^{#}	Boston Hunters	Outfielder	(Canada) Oakville, Ontario
5	85	Braidy Birdsall ^{#}	Boston Hunters	Second baseman	(Canada) Saskatoon, Saskatchewan
5	86	Adelaide Ziebart ^{#}	New York Heights	Right fielder	(Canada) Saskatoon, Saskatchewan
5	87	Elodie O'Sullivan ^{#}	Los Angeles Queens	Outfielder	Perth, Western Australia
5	88	Kiley Ingram ^{#}	San Francisco Firebells	Pitcher	(United States) Ontario, California
5	89	Scrappy Hopkins ^{#}	San Francisco Firebells	Catcher	(United States) Fort Walton Beach, Florida
5	90	Genevieve Hastings ^{#}	Los Angeles Queens	Shortstop	(United States) Billings, Montana
5	91	Edith De Leija	Boston Hunters	Third baseman	(Mexico) Aldama, Tamaulipas
5	92	Meaghan Houk ^{#}	Boston Hunters	Infielder	(United States) Ravena, New York
5	93	Laura Hirai ^{#}	Boston Hunters	Pitcher	(United Kingdom) London, England
5	94	Angela Valenzuela ^{#}	New York Heights	Pitcher	(United States) Phoenix, Arizona
5	95	Ayuri Shimano	Los Angeles Queens	Pitcher	(Japan) Osaka, Osaka
5	96	Flor Elena Valerio Montoya ^{#}	San Francisco Firebells	Pitcher	(Mexico) Tijuana, Baja California
5	97	Estheoa Segovia ^{#}	San Francisco Firebells	Catcher	(Mexico) Tijuana, Baja California
5	98	Luisa Hernandez ^{#}	Los Angeles Queens	First baseman	(Mexico) Lagos de Moreno, Jalisco
5	99	Melissa Mayeux ^{#}	New York Heights	Shortstop	(France) Louviers, Normandy
5	100	Olivia Bricker *	Boston Hunters	Pitcher	(United States) Cincinnati, Ohio
6	101	Sadie Zion ^{#}	Boston Hunters	First baseman	(United States) Danbury, Connecticut
6	102	Chloe Atkinson ^{#}	New York Heights	—	Perth, Western Australia
6	103	Adelaide Frank *	Los Angeles Queens	First baseman	(United States) Oakville, Missouri
6	104	Bella Espinoza-Molina ^{#}	San Francisco Firebells	Right fielder	(United States) Ladera Ranch, California
6	105	Arwen McCullough ^{#}	San Francisco Firebells	Pitcher	(United States) Livermore, California
6	106	Brittany Womack ^{#}	Los Angeles Queens	Right fielder	(United States) San Diego, California
6	107	Milanyela Cortez ^{#}	New York Heights	Pitcher	(Venezuela) Barquisimeto, Lara
6	108	Nadia Diaz ^{#}	Boston Hunters	Third baseman	(United States) Cicero, New York
6	109	Nylah Ramirez ^{#}	Boston Hunters	Pitcher	(United States) Brooklyn, New York
6	110	Abigail Moore ^{#}	New York Heights	Catcher	(United States) Arlington, Texas
6	111	Celicia Wilken ^{#}	Los Angeles Queens	First baseman	(United States) Austin, Texas
6	112	Allie Lacey ^{#}	San Francisco Firebells	Second baseman	(United States) La Crescenta, California
6	113	Micaela Minner ^{#}	San Francisco Firebells	First baseman	(United States) Akron, Ohio
6	114	Trinity Curtis ^{#}	Los Angeles Queens	Pitcher	(United States) Oakhurst, California
6	115	Minseo Park ^{#}	New York Heights	—	(South Korea) Seoul
6	116	Clara Rice ^{#}	Boston Hunters	Catcher	(United States) Bethesda, Maryland
6	117	Mary Grace O'Neill ^{#}	Boston Hunters	Center fielder	(United States) Pleasantville, New York
6	118	Sarah Beaulieu ^{#}	New York Heights	Pitcher	(Canada) Rivière-du-Loup, Quebec
6	119	Addisyn Baird *	Los Angeles Queens	Shortstop	(United States) Granger, Indiana
6	120	Kailyn Bearpaw ^{#}	San Francisco Firebells	First baseman	(United States) Sapulpa, Oklahoma
