= 2026 San Francisco Firebells season =

2026 San Francisco Firebells
- Regular season champions
- League: Women's Pro Baseball League
- Ballpark: Robin Roberts Stadium
- City: Springfield, Illinois (representing San Francisco, California)
- Record: 10–5 (.667)
- League place: 1st
- Manager: Matt Williams
- Television: ESPN+

The 2026 San Francisco Firebells season was the inaugural season of the San Francisco Firebells in the Women's Pro Baseball League (WPBL). They finished with a 10–5 record, clinching first place on September 2, in their third-to-last game following a win against the Los Angeles Queens. All WPBL teams played in the postseason, and the Firebells would go on to sweep the Boston Hunters in the first round, winning their semifinal series in two games, moving on to the Championship Series. They faced the Los Angeles Queens, losing the inaugural WPBL Championship in five games.

== Draft ==
For the inaugural season, each WPBL team drafted 30 players, signing 15 of those players. The draft occurred on November 20, 2025, virtually on YouTube.

Key
*	Player later signed by team
#	Player not signed by team

Rnd	Pick	Player	Team	Position	Hometown
1	1	Kelsie Whitmore	San Francisco Firebells	Pitcher	(United States) San Diego, California
1	8	Amanda Gianelloni	San Francisco Firebells	Second baseman	(United States) New Orleans, Louisiana
1	9	Joely Leguizamon	San Francisco Firebells	Shortstop	(United States) Jacksonville, Florida
1	16	Jill Albayati	San Francisco Firebells	Pitcher, Utility player	(United States) Anaheim, California
1	17	Samantha Gutierrez	San Francisco Firebells	Catcher	(United States) San Diego, California
2	24	Ayaka Yamamoto	San Francisco Firebells	Third baseman	(Japan) Fukuyama, Hiroshima
2	25	Niki Eckert	San Francisco Firebells	Pitcher	(United States) Englewood, New Jersey
2	32	Andréanne Leblanc	San Francisco Firebells	First baseman	(Canada) Mont-Saint-Hilaire, Quebec
2	33	Jua Park	San Francisco Firebells	Shortstop	(South Korea) Hadong, South Gyeongsang
2	40	Alexia Jorge	San Francisco Firebells	Catcher	(United States) Lyndhurst, New Jersey
3	41	Ela Day-Bédard	San Francisco Firebells	Infielder	(Canada) Gatineau, Quebec
3	48	Rosi del Castillo	San Francisco Firebells	Center fielder	(Mexico) Puebla, Puebla
3	49	Liz Gilder	San Francisco Firebells	Pitcher	(Canada) Port Moody, British Columbia
3	56	Skylar Kaplan	San Francisco Firebells	Left fielder	(United States) Glen Burnie, Maryland
3	57	Hinano Beppu	San Francisco Firebells	Second baseman	(Japan) Nakagawa, Fukuoka
4	64	Jordan Eyster *	San Francisco Firebells	Center fielder	(United States) Royal Oak, Michigan
4	65	Katie Reynolds ^{#}	San Francisco Firebells	Pitcher	(United States) Watertown, Massachusetts
4	72	Peyton Coria *	San Francisco Firebells	Pitcher	(United States) Perris, California
4	73	Hanna Miura ^{#}	San Francisco Firebells	Second baseman	(Japan) Sapporo, Hokkaido
4	80	Kaija Bazzano ^{#}	San Francisco Firebells	Shortstop	(United States) Sebastopol, California
5	81	Kaelei Kajitani ^{#}	San Francisco Firebells	First baseman	(United States) Madera, California
5	88	Kiley Ingram ^{#}	San Francisco Firebells	Pitcher	(United States) Ontario, California
5	89	Scrappy Hopkins ^{#}	San Francisco Firebells	Catcher	(United States) Fort Walton Beach, Florida
5	96	Flor Elena Valerio Montoya ^{#}	San Francisco Firebells	Pitcher	(Mexico) Tijuana, Baja California
5	97	Estheoa Segovia ^{#}	San Francisco Firebells	Catcher	(Mexico) Tijuana, Baja California
6	104	Bella Espinoza-Molina ^{#}	San Francisco Firebells	Right fielder	(United States) Ladera Ranch, California
6	105	Arwen McCullough ^{#}	San Francisco Firebells	Pitcher	(United States) Livermore, California
6	112	Allie Lacey ^{#}	San Francisco Firebells	Second baseman	(United States) La Crescenta, California
6	113	Micaela Minner ^{#}	San Francisco Firebells	First baseman	(United States) Akron, Ohio
6	120	Kailyn Bearpaw ^{#}	San Francisco Firebells	First baseman	(United States) Sapulpa, Oklahoma

== Regular season ==
=== Season standings ===
Women's Pro Baseball League
Team	W	L	Pct.	GB	Home	Road
San Francisco Firebells	10	5	.667	—	6‍–‍2	4‍–‍3
New York Heights	8	7	.533	2	2‍–‍5	6‍–‍2
Los Angeles Queens	8	7	.533	2	5‍–‍2	3‍–‍5
Boston Hunters	4	11	.267	6	1‍–‍7	3‍–‍4

=== Record vs. opponents ===
2026 Women's Pro Baseball League record Source: WPBL Schedule
Team	BOS	LA	NY	SF
Boston	—	1–4	3–2	0–5
Los Angeles	4–1	—	2–3	2–3
New York	2–3	3–2	—	3–2
San Francisco	5–0	3–2	2–3	—

Updated with the results of all games through September 6, 2026.

=== Game log ===
Legend
Firebells Win	Firebells Loss	Game Postponed
Bold = Firebells team member

2026 Game Log
Overall: 10–5 (Home: 6–2; Away: 4–3)
August: 8–4 (Home: 5–2; Away: 3–2)

#	Date	Opponent	Score	Win	Loss	Save	Location	Record
1	August 2	@ Hunters	W 11–3	**Eckert** (1–0)	Padgham (0–1)	–	Robin Roberts Stadium	1–0
2	August 6	Heights	L 8–13	Lee (1–0)	**Gilder** (0–1)	–	**Robin Roberts Stadium**	1–1
3	August 7	@ Queens	L 3–12	Sato (1–0)	**Whitmore** (0–1)	–	Robin Roberts Stadium	1–2
4	August 8	Queens	W 10–3	**Albayati** (1–0)	Roche (1–1)	–	**Robin Roberts Stadium**	2–2
5	August 12	Queens	W 8–2	**Gilder** (1–1)	Sato (1–1)	–	**Robin Roberts Stadium**	3–2
6	August 14	Queens	W 17–3	**Whitmore** (1–1)	Narasaki (0–1)	–	**Robin Roberts Stadium**	4–2
7	August 15	@ Heights	W 11–6	**Albayati** (2–0)	Lee (1–1)	–	Robin Roberts Stadium	5–2
8	August 19	Heights	L 8–11 (6)	O'Sullivan (2–0)	**Day-Bédard** (0–1)	–	**Robin Roberts Stadium**	5–3
9	August 21	@ Queens	W 8–6	Mackay (1–0)	**Coria** (0–1)	–	Robin Roberts Stadium	5–4
10	August 22	@ Hunters	W 12–5	**Gilder** (2–1)	Benach (0–1)	–	Robin Roberts Stadium	6–4
11	August 28	Hunters	W 14–6	**Whitmore** (2–1)	Schroder (0–3)	–	**Robin Roberts Stadium**	7–4
12	August 30	Heights	W 11–9	**Gilder** (3–1)	O'Sullivan (3–1)	–	**Robin Roberts Stadium**	8–4

September: 2–1 (Home: 1–0; Away: 1–1)

#	Date	Opponent	Score	Win	Loss	Save	Location	Record
13	September 2	@ Hunters	W 8–5	**Whitmore** (3–1)	Blunt (1–2)	–	Robin Roberts Stadium	9–4
14	September 4	@ Heights	L 2–14	Saiki (1–0)	**Gilder** (3–2)	–	Robin Roberts Stadium	9–5
15	September 6	Hunters	W 13–7	**Eckert** (2–0)	Dumais (1–1)	–	**Robin Roberts Stadium**	10–5

== Postseason ==
=== Postseason game log ===
2026 Postseason Game Log: 4–3 (Home: 1–3; Away: 3–0)
Semifinals: 2–0 (Home: 1–0; Away: 1–0)

#	Date	Opponent	Score	Win	Loss	Save	Location	Record
1	September 9	Hunters	W 6–4	Whitmore (1–0)	Blunt (0–1)	–	Robin Roberts Stadium	1–0
2	September 11	@ Hunters	W 9–6	Eckert (1–0)	Benach (0–1)	–	Robin Roberts Stadium	2–0

Championship: 2–3 (Home: 0–3; Away: 2–0)

#	Date	Opponent	Score	Win	Loss	Save	Location	Record
1	September 16	Queens	L 6–7	Mackay (1–0)	del Castillo (0–1)	–	Robin Roberts Stadium	0–1
2	September 17	Queens	L 7–11	Sato (2–0)	Albayati (0–1)	–	Robin Roberts Stadium	0–2
3	September 19	@ Queens	W 10–5	Day-Bédard (1–0)	Roche (1–1)	–	Robin Roberts Stadium	1–2
4	September 20	@ Queens	W 17–4	Eckert (2–0)	Mackay (1–1)	–	Robin Roberts Stadium	2–2
5	September 22	Queens	L 0–2	Sato (3–0)	Albayati (0–2)	–	Robin Roberts Stadium	2–3

== Current roster ==
San Francisco Firebells roster
Active roster		Coaching staff
Pitchers: 18 (United States) Jill Albayati; 2 (United States) Peyton Coria; 22 (United States) Niki Eckert; 10 (Canada) Liz Gilder; 3 (United States) Kelsie Whitmore	Catchers: 33 (United States) Samantha Gutierrez; 26 (United States) Alexia Jorge; Infielders: 8 (Japan) Hinano Beppu; 25 (Canada) Ela Day-Bédard; 5 (United States) Amanda Gianelloni; 16 (Canada) Andréanne Leblanc; 13 (United States) Joely Leguizamon; 7 (South Korea) Jua Park; 6 (Japan) Ayaka Yamamoto; Outfielders: 57 (Mexico) Rosi del Castillo; 1 (United States) Jordan Eyster; 21 (United States) Skylar Kaplan	Manager: 4 Matt Williams; Coaches: 12 Jeff Inglin; 11 Sam Unger; Roster updated on November 9, 2026: Disabled list; ‡ Inactive list; § Suspended list

== Player statistics ==
Updated as of 6 September 2026

=== Batting ===
= Indicates team leader in category (Note: To qualify as a team leader in AVG, OBP, SLG, or OPS, a player must have 3.1 plate appearances per team game.)

= Indicates league leader

Note: G = Games played; AB = At bats; R = Runs; H = Hits; 2B = Doubles; 3B = Triples; HR = Home runs; RBI = Runs batted in; SB = Stolen bases; CS = Caught stealing; BB = Walks; SO = Strikeouts; AVG = Batting average; OBP = On-base percentage; SLG = Slugging percentage; OPS = On-base plus slugging

Player	G	AB	R	H	2B	3B	HR	RBI	SB	CS	BB	SO	AVG	OBP	SLG	OPS
Andréanne Leblanc	15	52	13	20	3	0	2	14	0	0	11	1	.385	.500	.558	1.058
Kelsie Whitmore	15	51	21	23	2	0	11	32	1	0	10	5	.451	.531	1.137	1.669
Amanda Gianelloni	15	49	17	16	4	0	1	13	2	0	9	7	.327	.429	.469	.898
Joely Leguizamon	15	55	11	17	4	0	0	14	2	2	6	11	.309	.387	.382	.769
Skylar Kaplan	14	51	16	25	4	0	1	11	0	0	7	0	.490	.552	.627	1.179
Alexia Jorge	13	40	15	16	1	0	2	9	1	1	6	5	.400	.547	.575	1.122
Jua Park	14	40	13	16	2	0	0	13	4	0	8	2	.400	.520	.450	.970
Jill Albayati	9	32	11	13	6	0	1	7	0	0	6	4	.406	.513	.688	1.200
Ela Day-Bédard	12	25	8	5	0	0	0	3	0	0	1	12	.200	.364	.200	.564
Jordan Eyster	10	21	5	7	2	0	0	6	0	0	3	6	.333	.400	.429	.829
Samantha Gutierrez	6	16	6	7	1	0	1	9	0	0	3	1	.438	.571	.688	1.259
Ayaka Yamamoto	5	12	5	6	0	0	0	0	0	0	1	0	.500	.571	.500	1.071
Rosi del Castillo	5	6	1	3	1	0	0	0	0	0	0	1	.500	.500	.667	1.167
Niki Eckert	6	3	0	0	0	0	0	0	0	0	1	1	.000	.250	.000	.250
Hinano Beppu	2	3	0	0	0	0	0	0	0	0	0	2	.000	.000	.000	.000
Peyton Coria	8	2	0	0	0	0	0	0	0	0	0	2	.000	.000	.000	.000
Liz Gilder	6	2	0	0	0	0	0	0	0	0	0	1	.000	.000	.000	.000
Team totals	15	460	142	174	30	0	19	131	10	3	72	61	.378	.480	.567	1.047
Rank in 4 WPBL teams	—	2	1	1	1	1	1	1	4	4	2	3	1	1	1	1

Source: Baseball Reference

=== Pitching ===
= Indicates team leader in category (Note: To qualify as a team leader in ERA or WHIP, a player must have 1.0 IP per team game.)

= Indicates league leader

Note: W = Wins; L = Losses; ERA = Earned run average; G = Games pitched; GS = Games started; SV = Saves; IP = Innings pitched; H = Hits allowed; R = Runs allowed; ER = Earned runs allowed; HR = Home runs allowed; BB = Walks allowed (bases on balls); SO = Strikeouts; HBP = Hit by pitch; WHIP = Walks + hits per inning pitched

Player	W	L	ERA	G	GS	SV	IP	H	R	ER	HR	BB	SO	HBP	WHIP
Kelsie Whitmore	3	1	5.25	6	6	0	24.0	33	19	18	4	13	15	1	1.917
Niki Eckert	2	0	5.63	6	3	0	18.7	20	19	15	2	13	13	4	1.768
Liz Gilder	3	2	4.13	6	4	0	18.7	28	21	11	1	11	8	2	2.089
Peyton Coria	0	1	6.81	8	0	0	12.3	21	14	12	2	9	11	1	2.432
Jill Albayati	2	0	1.40	3	2	0	10.0	11	5	2	2	3	10	2	1.400
Ela Day-Bédard	0	1	15.75	5	0	0	8.0	17	19	18	4	7	2	4	3.000
Rosi del Castillo	0	0	4.94	5	0	0	5.7	6	4	4	1	2	4	1	1.412
Andréanne Leblanc	0	0	0.00	2	0	0	2.0	1	0	0	0	1	1	0	1.000
Jua Park	0	0	25.20	2	0	0	1.7	4	6	6	0	6	1	2	6.000
Team totals	10	5	5.96	15	15	0	101	141	107	86	16	65	65	17	2.040
Rank in 4 WPBL teams	1	4	2	—	—	1	3	3	4	4	2	3	3	3	2

Source: Baseball Reference (WPBL for ERA)
