= 2026 Los Angeles Queens season =

2026 Los Angeles Queens
- Women's Pro Baseball League champions
- League: Women's Pro Baseball League
- Ballpark: Robin Roberts Stadium
- City: Springfield, Illinois (representing Los Angeles, California)
- Record: 8–7 (.533)
- League place: 3rd
- Manager: Eric Young Sr.
- Television: ESPN+

The 2026 Los Angeles Queens season was the inaugural season of the Los Angeles Queens in the Women's Pro Baseball League (WPBL). They finished with an 8–7 record, clinching third place on their penultimate game of the season following a loss to the New York Heights. (Note: The Queens would go on to win one more game on their next/final game, also finishing with an 8–7 record. The Heights won the season series with the Queens, 3–2, resulting in the Queens clinching third place even before they won their eighth game.) All WPBL teams played in the postseason, and the Queens would go on to defeat the Heights in the first round, winning their semifinal series in three games, moving on to the Championship Series. They faced the San Francisco Firebells, winning the inaugural WPBL Championship in five games.

== Draft ==
For the inaugural season, each WPBL team drafted 30 players, signing 15 of those players. The draft occurred on November 20, 2025, virtually on YouTube.

Key
*	Player later signed by team
#	Player not signed by team

Rnd	Pick	Player	Position	Hometown
1	2	Ayami Sato	Pitcher	(Japan) Tokorozawa, Saitama
1	7	Ashton Lansdell	Third baseman	(United States) Marietta, Georgia
1	10	Mo'ne Davis	Center fielder	(United States) Philadelphia, Pennsylvania
1	15	Meggie Meidlinger	Pitcher	(United States) Sterling, Virginia
1	18	Tháima Maximiliana	Shortstop	Curaçao
2	23	Jamie Mackay	Catcher	(United States) Laguna Beach, California
2	26	Emi Saiki	Shortstop	(Japan) Kagawa
2	31	Samaria Benítez	Shortstop	(Mexico) Nayarit
2	34	Maggie Foxx	Catcher	(United States) Bedford, New Hampshire
2	39	Michelle Roche	Pitcher	(Canada) Burnaby, British Columbia
3	42	Suzu Narasaki	Center fielder	(Japan) Setouchi, Okayama
3	47	Caitlin Eynon	Shortstop	Perth, Western Australia
3	50	Sarah Edwards	First baseman	(United States) Bay Shore, New York
3	55	Brittany Apgar	Center fielder	(United States) Greensboro, North Carolina
3	58	Autumn Mills ^{#}	Pitcher	(Canada) Burlington, Ontario
4	63	Leah Cornish ^{#}	Catcher	Perth, Western Australia
4	66	Juliette Kladko ^{#}	Pitcher	(Canada) Vancouver, British Columbia
4	71	Amira Hondras *	Second baseman	(United States) Chicago, Illinois
4	74	Sydney Barry ^{#}	Pitcher	(Canada) Fort Mcmurray, Alberta
4	79	Rio Obitsu ^{#}	Second baseman	(Japan) Saitama, Saitama
5	82	Isabella Villarreal *	Second baseman	(United States) Newport, Michigan
5	87	Elodie O'Sullivan ^{#}	Outfielder	Perth, Western Australia
5	90	Genevieve Hastings ^{#}	Shortstop	(United States) Billings, Montana
5	95	Ayuri Shimano	Pitcher	(Japan) Osaka, Osaka
5	98	Luisa Hernandez ^{#}	First baseman	(Mexico) Lagos de Moreno, Jalisco
6	103	Adelaide Frank *	First baseman	(United States) Oakville, Missouri
6	106	Brittany Womack ^{#}	Right fielder	(United States) San Diego, California
6	111	Celicia Wilken ^{#}	First baseman	(United States) Austin, Texas
6	114	Trinity Curtis ^{#}	Pitcher	(United States) Oakhurst, California
6	119	Addisyn Baird *	Shortstop	(United States) Granger, Indiana

== Regular season ==
=== Season standings ===
Women's Pro Baseball League
Team	W	L	Pct.	GB	Home	Road
San Francisco Firebells	10	5	.667	—	6‍–‍2	4‍–‍3
New York Heights	8	7	.533	2	2‍–‍5	6‍–‍2
Los Angeles Queens	8	7	.533	2	5‍–‍2	3‍–‍5
Boston Hunters	4	11	.267	6	1‍–‍7	3‍–‍4

=== Record vs. opponents ===
2026 Women's Pro Baseball League record Source: WPBL Schedule
Team	BOS	LA	NY	SF
Boston	—	1–4	3–2	0–5
Los Angeles	4–1	—	2–3	2–3
New York	2–3	3–2	—	3–2
San Francisco	5–0	3–2	2–3	—

Updated with the results of all games through September 6, 2026.

=== Game log ===
Legend
Queens Win	Queens Loss	Game Postponed
Bold = Queens team member

2026 Game Log
Overall: 8–7 (Home: 5–2; Away: 3–5)
August: 7–6 (Home: 5–1; Away: 2–5)

#	Date	Opponent	Score	Win	Loss	Save	Location	Record
1	August 1	@ Heights	W 10–8	**Meidlinger** (1–0)	Reynolds (0–1)	–	Robin Roberts Stadium	1–0
2	August 5	Hunters	W 12–4	**Roche** (1–0)	Schroder (0–1)	–	**Robin Roberts Stadium**	2–0
3	August 7	Firebells	W 12–3	**Sato** (1–0)	Whitmore (0–1)	–	**Robin Roberts Stadium**	3–0
4	August 8	@ Firebells	L 3–10	Albayati (1–0)	**Roche** (1–1)	–	Robin Roberts Stadium	3–1
5	August 12	@ Firebells	L 2–8	Gilder (1–1)	**Sato** (1–1)	–	Robin Roberts Stadium	3–2
6	August 14	@ Firebells	L 3–17	Whitmore (1–1)	**Narasaki** (0–1)	–	Robin Roberts Stadium	3–3
7	August 15	@ Hunters	W 13–3	**Roche** (2–1)	Padgham (0–2)	–	Robin Roberts Stadium	4–3
8	August 21	Firebells	W 8–6	**Mackay** (1–0)	Coria (0–1)	–	**Robin Roberts Stadium**	5–3
9	August 22	Heights	L 7–8 (8)	Lee (3–1)	**Meidlinger** (1–1)	–	**Robin Roberts Stadium**	5–4
10	August 23	@ Hunters	L 3–7	Blunt (1–1)	**Shimano** (0–1)	–	Robin Roberts Stadium	5–5
11	August 26	Hunters	W 8–6	**Villarreal** (1–0)	Schroder (0–2)	–	**Robin Roberts Stadium**	6–5
12	August 27	@ Heights	L 4–12	O'Sullivan (3–0)	**Sato** (1–2)	–	Robin Roberts Stadium	6–6
13	August 29	Heights	W 10–6	**Shimano** (1–1)	Studer (0–1)	–	**Robin Roberts Stadium**	7–6

September: 1–1 (Home: 0–1; Away: 1–0)

#	Date	Opponent	Score	Win	Loss	Save	Location	Record
14	September 3	Heights	L 7–18	Eccles (1–1)	**Mackay** (1–1)	–	**Robin Roberts Stadium**	7–7
15	September 5	Hunters	W 10–6	**Roche** (3–1)	Schroder (0–4)	–	Robin Roberts Stadium	8–7

== Postseason ==
=== Postseason game log ===
2026 Postseason Game Log: 5–3 (Home: 0–3; Away: 5–0)
Semifinals: 2–1 (Home: 0–1; Away: 2–0)

#	Date	Opponent	Score	Win	Loss	Save	Location	Record
1	September 10	@ Heights	W 10–3	Roche (1–0)	Saiki (0–1)	–	Robin Roberts Stadium	1–0
2	September 12	Heights	L 7–9	Eccles (1–0)	Meidlinger (0–1)	–	Robin Roberts Stadium	1–1
2	September 14	@ Heights	W 15–11	Sato (1–0)	Eccles (1–1)	–	Robin Roberts Stadium	2–1

Championship: 3–2 (Home: 0–2; Away: 3–0)

#	Date	Opponent	Score	Win	Loss	Save	Location	Record
1	September 16	@ Firebells	W 7–6	Mackay (1–0)	del Castillo (0–1)	–	Robin Roberts Stadium	1–0
2	September 17	@ Firebells	W 11–7	Sato (2–0)	Albayati (0–1)	–	Robin Roberts Stadium	2–0
3	September 19	Firebells	L 5–10	Day-Bédard (1–0)	Roche (1–1)	–	Robin Roberts Stadium	2–1
4	September 20	Firebells	L 4–17	Eckert (2–0)	Mackay (1–1)	–	Robin Roberts Stadium	2–2
5	September 22	@ Firebells	W 2–0	Sato (3–0)	Albayati (0–2)	–	Robin Roberts Stadium	3–2

== Current roster ==
Los Angeles Queens roster
Active roster		Coaching staff
Pitchers: 13 (United States) Meggie Meidlinger; 27 (Canada) Michelle Roche; 18 (Japan) Ayami Sato; 19 (Japan) Ayuri Shimano	Catchers: 11 (United States) Maggie Foxx; 20 (United States) Jamie Mackay; Infielders: 17 (United States) Addisyn Baird; 58 (Mexico) Samaria Benítez; 25 (United States) Sarah Edwards; 29 (Australia) Caitlin Eynon; 17 (United States) Adelaide Frank; 7 (United States) Amira Hondras; 1 (United States) Ashton Lansdell (Captain); 2 (Curaçao) Tháima Maximiliana; 10 (United States) Isabella Villarreal; Outfielders: 0 (United States) Brittany Apgar; 3 (United States) Mo'ne Davis; 7 (Mexico) Diana Ibarra	Manager: 60 Eric Young Sr.; Coaches: 22 Emma Charlesworth-Seiler; Roster updated on November 9, 2026: Disabled list; ‡ Inactive list; § Suspended list

== Transactions ==
- On August 21, traded Suzu Narasaki and Emi Saiki to the New York Heights for Diana Ibarra.

== Player statistics ==
Updated as of 6 September 2026

=== Batting ===
= Indicates team leader in category (Note: To qualify as a team leader in AVG, OBP, SLG, or OPS, a player must have 3.1 plate appearances per team game.)

= Indicates league leader

Note: G = Games played; AB = At bats; R = Runs; H = Hits; 2B = Doubles; 3B = Triples; HR = Home runs; RBI = Runs batted in; SB = Stolen bases; CS = Caught stealing; BB = Walks; SO = Strikeouts; AVG = Batting average; OBP = On-base percentage; SLG = Slugging percentage; OPS = On-base plus slugging

Player	G	AB	R	H	2B	3B	HR	RBI	SB	CS	BB	SO	AVG	OBP	SLG	OPS
Ashton Lansdell	15	44	21	21	4	0	4	14	8	0	12	11	.477	.600	.841	1.441
Samaria Benítez	14	47	11	20	0	0	0	4	0	1	3	6	.426	.471	.426	.896
Jamie Mackay	15	44	16	17	2	0	5	17	1	0	3	3	.386	.471	.773	1.243
Maggie Foxx	14	42	12	14	3	0	1	6	1	0	8	3	.333	.440	.476	.916
Sarah Edwards	13	39	7	14	1	0	1	11	0	1	9	7	.359	.490	.462	.951
Mo'ne Davis	13	39	7	9	3	0	0	7	0	0	6	5	.231	.333	.308	.641
Amira Hondras	12	35	5	8	2	0	0	11	2	2	6	3	.229	.349	.286	.635
Caitlin Eynon	12	38	8	15	6	0	1	10	0	0	3	7	.395	.429	.632	1.060
Thaima Maximiliana	12	25	4	6	1	0	1	4	1	1	2	5	.240	.321	.400	.721
Ayuri Shimano	8	20	8	6	1	0	0	2	0	0	5	8	.300	.464	.350	.814
Michelle Roche	11	17	4	6	3	0	0	3	0	0	2	2	.353	.421	.529	.950
Adelaide Frank	7	15	2	5	0	0	0	4	0	0	2	1	.333	.412	.333	.745
Isabella Villarreal	6	13	3	6	1	0	0	5	0	0	1	3	.462	.533	.538	1.072
Brittany Apgar	6	8	2	2	0	0	0	1	1	0	2	4	.250	.400	.250	.650
Diana Ibarra	4	2	0	0	0	0	0	1	0	0	2	0	.000	.600	.000	.600
Suzu Narasaki	3	4	1	1	1	0	0	0	1	0	0	1	.250	.250	.500	.750
Addisyn Baird	1	3	1	1	0	0	0	0	0	0	1	1	.333	.500	.333	.833
Meggie Meidlinger	9	1	0	0	0	0	0	0	0	0	0	0	.000	.000	.000	.000
Team totals	15	436	112	151	28	0	13	100	15	5	67	70	.346	.446	.500	.946
Rank in 4 WPBL teams	—	3	3	3	2	1	3	3	3	1	3	2	3	3	3	3

Source: Baseball Reference

=== Pitching ===
= Indicates team leader in category (Note: To qualify as a team leader in ERA or WHIP, a player must have 1.0 IP per team game.)

= Indicates league leader

Note: W = Wins; L = Losses; ERA = Earned run average; G = Games pitched; GS = Games started; SV = Saves; IP = Innings pitched; H = Hits allowed; R = Runs allowed; ER = Earned runs allowed; HR = Home runs allowed; BB = Walks allowed (bases on balls); SO = Strikeouts; HBP = Hit by pitch; WHIP = Walks + hits per inning pitched

Player	W	L	ERA	G	GS	SV	IP	H	R	ER	HR	BB	SO	HBP	WHIP
Ayami Sato	1	2	6.09	7	6	0	23.0	42	31	20	5	3	17	2	1.957
Michelle Roche	3	1	5.82	6	5	0	21.2	30	23	18	2	10	9	1	1.846
Meggie Meidlinger	1	1	1.83	9	0	0	15.1	11	5	4	1	4	13	0	0.978
Jamie Mackay	1	1	11.81	5	1	0	10.2	25	24	18	4	6	9	3	2.906
Ayuri Shimano	1	1	5.65	3	1	0	8.2	6	10	7	2	8	8	2	1.615
Thaima Maximiliana	0	0	7.00	4	1	0	8.0	10	9	8	0	7	3	2	2.125
Amira Hondras	0	0	6.46	2	0	0	4.1	9	4	4	0	2	2	1	2.538
Isabella Villarreal	1	0	7.00	2	0	0	4.0	6	4	4	2	3	4	1	2.250
Maggie Foxx	0	0	3.00	2	0	0	2.1	2	1	1	1	3	2	0	2.143
Suzu Narasaki	0	1	31.50	1	1	0	1.1	6	8	6	0	3	1	0	6.750
Adelaide Frank	0	0	7.00	1	0	0	1.0	0	1	1	0	5	0	0	5.000
Brittany Apgar	0	0	21.00	1	0	0	0.2	1	2	2	1	4	0	0	7.500
Team totals	8	7	6.45	15	15	0	101	148	122	93	18	58	68	12	2.040
Rank in 4 WPBL teams	2	2	3	—	—	1	3	2	2	2	1	4	2	4	1

Source: Baseball Reference (WPBL for ERA)
