= 2026 New York Heights season =

2026 New York Heights
- League: Women's Pro Baseball League
- Ballpark: Robin Roberts Stadium
- City: Springfield, Illinois (representing New York City, New York)
- Record: 8–7 (.533)
- League place: 2nd
- Manager: Rachelle "Rocky" Henley
- Television: ESPN+

The 2026 New York Heights season was the inaugural season of the New York Heights in the Women's Pro Baseball League (WPBL). They finished with an 8–7 record, clinching second place on their last game of the season following a win against the Los Angeles Queens. (Note: The Queens would go on to win one more game on their next/final game, also finishing with an 8–7 record. The Heights won the season series with the Queens, 3–2, resulting in their clinching of second place even before the Queens won their eighth game.) All WPBL teams played in the postseason, though the Heights would not exit the first round, losing their semifinal series to the Queens in three games.

== Draft ==
For the inaugural season, each WPBL team drafted 30 players, signing 15 of those players. The draft occurred on November 20, 2025, virtually on YouTube.

Key
*	Player later signed by team
#	Player not signed by team

Rnd	Pick	Player	Position	Hometown
1	3	Kylee Lahners	Third baseman	(United States) Pinehurst, North Carolina
1	6	Denae Benites	Catcher	(United States) Las Vegas, Nevada
1	11	Rakyung Kim	Pitcher	(South Korea) Seoul
1	13	Valerie Perez	Shortstop	(United States) Corpus Christi, Texas
1	14	Jaida Lee	Pitcher	(Canada) St. John's, Newfoundland
1	19	London Studer	First baseman	(United States) Gahanna, Ohio
2	22	Keira Izumi	Shortstop	(United States) San Diego, California
2	27	Natsuki Yonetani	Left fielder	(Japan) Saitama, Saitama
2	30	Alyssa Zettlemoyer	Catcher	(United States) Murrieta, California
2	35	Madison Willan	Infielder	(Canada) Edmonton, Alberta
2	38	Claire Eccles	Center fielder	(Canada) Vancouver, British Columbia
3	43	Elodie Ciamarro	Catcher	(Canada) Mont-Saint-Hilaire, Quebec
3	46	Jacqui Reynolds	Pitcher	(United States) Woburn, Massachusetts
3	51	Diana Ibarra	Center fielder	(Mexico) Tepatitlán, Jalisco
3	54	Claire O'Sullivan	Pitcher	(Australia) Maroubra, New South Wales
3	59	McKenna Huff ^{#}	Shortstop	(United States) Fairfax, Virginia
4	62	Maddison Erwin ^{#}	Pitcher	(Australia) Canberra
4	67	Angelis Rivera ^{#}	Pitcher	(Puerto Rico) Juncos
4	70	Rocio Barajas ^{#}	Pitcher	(Mexico) Puerto Vallarta, Jalisco
4	75	Nicole Rivera-Moats ^{#}	Second baseman	(Puerto Rico) Juncos
4	78	Katherine Murphy *	Left fielder	(United States) Belmont, Massachusetts
5	83	Zoe Falardeau ^{#}	Pitcher	(Canada) Welland, Ontario
5	86	Adelaide Ziebart ^{#}	Right fielder	(Canada) Saskatoon, Saskatchewan
5	94	Angela Valenzuela ^{#}	Pitcher	(United States) Phoenix, Arizona
5	99	Melissa Mayeux ^{#}	Shortstop	(France) Louviers, Normandy
6	102	Chloe Atkinson ^{#}	—	Perth, Western Australia
6	107	Milanyela Cortez ^{#}	Pitcher	(Venezuela) Barquisimeto, Lara
6	110	Abigail Moore ^{#}	Catcher	(United States) Arlington, Texas
6	115	Minseo Park ^{#}	—	(South Korea) Seoul
6	118	Sarah Beaulieu ^{#}	Pitcher	(Canada) Rivière-du-Loup, Quebec

== Regular season ==
=== Season standings ===
Women's Pro Baseball League
Team	W	L	Pct.	GB	Home	Road
San Francisco Firebells	10	5	.667	—	6‍–‍2	4‍–‍3
New York Heights	8	7	.533	2	2‍–‍5	6‍–‍2
Los Angeles Queens	8	7	.533	2	5‍–‍2	3‍–‍5
Boston Hunters	4	11	.267	6	1‍–‍7	3‍–‍4

=== Record vs. opponents ===
2026 Women's Pro Baseball League record Source: WPBL Schedule
Team	BOS	LA	NY	SF
Boston	—	1–4	3–2	0–5
Los Angeles	4–1	—	2–3	2–3
New York	2–3	3–2	—	3–2
San Francisco	5–0	3–2	2–3	—

Updated with the results of all games through September 6, 2026.

=== Game log ===
Legend
Heights Win	Heights Loss	Game Postponed
Bold = Heights team member

2026 Game Log
Overall: 8–7 (Home: 2–5; Away: 6–2)
August: 6–7 (Home: 1–5; Away: 5–2)

#	Date	Opponent	Score	Win	Loss	Save	Location	Record
1	August 1	Queens	L 8–10	Meidlinger (1–0)	**Reynolds** (0–1)	–	**Robin Roberts Stadium**	0–1
2	August 6	@ Firebells	W 13–8	**Lee** (1–0)	Glider (0–1)	–	Robin Roberts Stadium	1–1
3	August 8	Hunters	L 6–9	Dumais (1–0)	**Izumi** (0–1)	–	**Robin Roberts Stadium**	1–2
4	August 9	@ Hunters	W 7–6 (8)	**O'Sullivan** (1–0)	Blunt (0–1)	–	Robin Roberts Stadium	2–2
5	August 13	Hunters	L 1–6	Bricker (1–0)	**Eccles** (0–1)	–	**Robin Roberts Stadium**	2–3
6	August 15	Firebells	L 6–11	Albayati (2–0)	**Lee** (1–1)	–	**Robin Roberts Stadium**	2–4
7	August 16	Hunters	L 7–9	Schiano (1–0)	**Zettlemoyer** (0–1)	–	**Robin Roberts Stadium**	2–5
8	August 19	@ Firebells	W 11–8 (6)	**O'Sullivan** (2–0)	Day-Bédard (0–1)	–	Robin Roberts Stadium	3–5
9	August 20	@ Hunters	W 9–4	**Lee** (2–1)	Bricker (1–1)	–	**Robin Roberts Stadium**	4–5
10	August 22	@ Queens	W 8–7 (8)	**Lee** (3–1)	Meidlinger (1–1)	–	Robin Roberts Stadium	5–5
11	August 27	Queens	W 12–4	**O'Sullivan** (3–0)	Sato (1–2)	–	**Robin Roberts Stadium**	6–5
12	August 29	@ Queens	L 6–10	Shimano (1–1)	**Studer** (0–1)	–	Robin Roberts Stadium	6–6
13	August 30	@ Firebells	L 9–11	Gilder (3–1)	**O'Sullivan** (3–1)	–	Robin Roberts Stadium	6–7

September: 2–0 (Home: 1–0; Away: 1–0)

#	Date	Opponent	Score	Win	Loss	Save	Location	Record
14	September 3	@ Queens	W 18–7	**Eccles** (1–1)	Mackay (1–1)	–	Robin Roberts Stadium	7–7
15	September 4	Firebells	W 14–2	**Saiki** (1–0)	Gilder (3–2)	–	**Robin Roberts Stadium**	8–7

== Postseason ==
=== Postseason game log ===
2026 Postseason Game Log: 1–2 (Home: 0–2; Away: 1–0)
Semifinals: 1–2 (Home: 0–2; Away: 1–0)

#	Date	Opponent	Score	Win	Loss	Save	Location	Record
1	September 10	Queens	L 3–10	Roche (1–0)	Saiki (0–1)	–	Robin Roberts Stadium	0–1
2	September 12	@ Queens	W 9–7	Eccles (1–0)	Meidlinger (0–1)	–	Robin Roberts Stadium	1–1
3	September 14	Queens	L 11–15	Sato (1–0)	Eccles (1–1)	–	Robin Roberts Stadium	1–2

== Current roster ==
New York Heights roster
Active roster	Coaching staff
Pitchers: -- (Mexico) Rocio Barajas; -- (Canada) Sarah Beaulieu; -- (Venezuela) Milanyela Cortez; -- (Australia) Maddison Erwin; -- (Canada) Zoe Falardeau; 29 (South Korea) Kim Ra-kyung; 7 (Canada) Jaida Lee; 18 (Australia) Claire O'Sullivan; 31 (United States) Jacqui Reynolds; -- (Puerto Rico) Angelis Rivera; -- (United States) Angela Valenzuela; Catchers: -- (Australia) Chloe Atkinson; 2 (United States) Denae Benites; 19 (Canada) Elodie Ciamarro; -- (United States) Abigail Moore; 13 (United States) Alyssa Zettlemoyer; Infielders: -- (United States) McKenna Huff; 1 (United States) Keira Izumi; 22 (United States) Kylee Lahners; -- (France) Melissa Mayeux; -- (South Korea) Minseo Park; 27 (United States) Valerie Perez; -- (United States) Nicole Rivera-Moats; 23 (Japan) Emi Saiki; 5 (United States) London Studer; 4 (Canada) Madison Willan; Outfielders: 21 (Canada) Claire Eccles; 10 (United States) Katherine Murphy; 8 (Japan) Suzu Narasaki; 15 (Japan) Natsuki Yonetani; -- (Canada) Adelaide Ziebart	Manager: 10 Rachelle "Rocky" Henley; Coaches: -- Stephen Larkin; -- Jackson Henley; Roster updated on August 21, 2026: Disabled list; ‡ Inactive list; § Suspended list

== Transactions ==
- On August 21, traded Diana Ibarra to the Los Angeles Queens for Suzu Narasaki and Emi Saiki.

== Player statistics ==
Updated as of 4 September 2026

=== Batting ===
= Indicates team leader in category (Note: To qualify as a team leader in AVG, OBP, SLG, or OPS, a player must have 3.1 plate appearances per team game.)

= Indicates league leader

Note: G = Games played; AB = At bats; R = Runs; H = Hits; 2B = Doubles; 3B = Triples; HR = Home runs; RBI = Runs batted in; SB = Stolen bases; CS = Caught stealing; BB = Walks; SO = Strikeouts; AVG = Batting average; OBP = On-base percentage; SLG = Slugging percentage; OPS = On-base plus slugging

Player	G	AB	R	H	2B	3B	HR	RBI	SB	CS	BB	SO	AVG	OBP	SLG	OPS
Natsuki Yonetani	15	58	23	23	6	0	2	12	4	0	8	8	.397	.485	.603	1.089
Denae Benites	15	58	25	32	2	0	11	38	15	0	6	6	.552	.597	1.155	1.752
Kylee Lahners	14	32	11	10	3	0	2	14	0	0	12	6	.313	.549	.594	1.143
London Studer	13	39	9	15	0	0	0	8	4	0	4	2	.385	.432	.385	.816
Claire Eccles	13	39	8	11	2	0	0	5	1	0	1	4	.282	.293	.333	.626
Val Perez	9	33	12	11	1	0	1	9	1	0	3	0	.333	.395	.455	.849
Claire O'Sullivan	13	27	10	11	0	0	1	8	6	0	5	3	.407	.500	.519	1.019
Alyssa Zettlemoyer	13	26	3	8	2	0	0	2	2	0	2	4	.308	.424	.385	.809
Madison Willan	12	24	6	11	2	0	0	7	0	1	7	1	.458	.576	.542	1.117
Keira Izumi	12	25	5	8	1	0	1	3	3	0	2	5	.320	.400	.480	.880
Elodie Ciamarro	9	24	6	11	2	0	0	3	1	1	0	4	.458	.458	.542	1.000
Diana Ibarra	8	20	1	3	0	0	0	2	0	0	2	2	.150	.261	.150	.411
Emi Saiki	6	12	4	8	0	0	0	5	1	0	5	2	.667	.765	.667	1.431
Suzu Narasaki	4	13	5	3	1	0	0	4	2	0	0	1	.231	.214	.308	.522
Jaida Lee	10	13	3	1	0	0	0	2	3	0	2	7	.077	.200	.077	.277
Katherine Murphy	8	13	1	1	0	0	0	2	1	1	2	1	.077	.200	.077	.277
Rakyung Kim	10	11	2	2	0	0	0	1	1	1	2	3	.182	.308	.182	.490
Jacqui Reynolds	6	0	1	0	0	0	0	0	0	0	1	0		1.000		
Team totals	15	467	135	169	22	0	18	125	45	4	64	59	.362	.451	.525	.976
Rank in 4 WPBL teams	—	1	2	2	3	1	2	2	1	2	4	4	2	2	2	2

Source: Baseball Reference

=== Pitching ===
= Indicates team leader in category (Note: To qualify as a team leader in ERA or WHIP, a player must have 1.0 IP per team game.)

= Indicates league leader

Note: W = Wins; L = Losses; ERA = Earned run average; G = Games pitched; GS = Games started; SV = Saves; IP = Innings pitched; H = Hits allowed; R = Runs allowed; ER = Earned runs allowed; HR = Home runs allowed; BB = Walks allowed (bases on balls); SO = Strikeouts; HBP = Hit by pitch; WHIP = Walks + hits per inning pitched

Player	W	L	ERA	G	GS	SV	IP	H	R	ER	HR	BB	SO	HBP	WHIP
Rakyung Kim	0	0	7.00	6	5	0	21.0	26	28	21	1	14	18	8	1.905
Jaida Lee	3	1	4.44	8	2	0	17.1	20	14	11	1	6	23	5	1.500
Claire O'Sullivan	3	1	3.06	6	1	0	16.0	25	14	7	2	11	10	3	2.250
Jacqui Reynolds	0	1	4.67	5	2	0	12.0	20	10	8	1	7	7	2	2.250
Emi Saiki	1	0	4.45	2	2	0	11.0	12	8	7	2	2	7	3	1.273
Claire Eccles	1	1	2.10	4	2	0	10.0	7	3	3	0	8	12	2	1.500
London Studer	0	1	8.75	5	0	0	8.0	13	14	10	0	14	8	1	3.375
Alyssa Zettlemoyer	0	1	9.00	3	0	0	4.2	8	8	6	1	7	1	1	3.214
Keira Izumi	0	1	21.00	4	1	0	4.0	10	13	12	2	8	0	0	4.500
Team totals	8	7	5.72	15	15	0	104	141	112	85	10	77	86	25	2.096
Rank in 4 WPBL teams	2	2	1	—	—	1	1	4	3	3	4	1	1	1	3

Source: Baseball Reference (WPBL for ERA)
