= 2026 Women's Pro Baseball League season =

Professional baseball season in the United States

2026 WPBL season
- League: Women's Pro Baseball League
- Sport: Baseball
- Duration: Regular season: August 1 – September 6, 2026; Postseason: September 9–22, 2026
- Games: 15
- Teams: 4
- TV partner: ESPN+
- Streaming partner(s): ESPN Select; Scripps Sports Network; YouTube

Draft
- Top draft pick: Kelsie Whitmore
- Picked by: San Francisco Firebells

Regular season
- Season champions: San Francisco Firebells

Postseason
- Finals champions: Los Angeles Queens
- Runners-up: San Francisco Firebells

WPBL seasons
- 2027 →

The 2026 Women's Pro Baseball League season began on August 1 with the inaugural game in league history where the New York Heights hosted the Los Angeles Queens. The regular season ended on September 6. The postseason began on September 9. The WPBL Championship Series then began on September 16 and concluded on September 22 with the Los Angeles Queens defeating the San Francisco Firebells in five games to win the inaugural WPBL championship title.

== Schedule ==
The Women's Pro Baseball League (WPBL) released its 2026 schedule on April 30, 2026. Each team played 15 regular season games, in a triple round-robin format, playing all other teams five times. From Saturday, August 1 through Sunday, September 6, with the exception of Mondays and Tuesdays, one game was played at 6:30 PM CDT, though three Saturdays (August 8, 15, and 27) featured two games, at 1:00 PM and 6:30 PM CDT. All four teams competed in the playoffs. The semi-final round began on September 9 and ended on September 14. The WPBL Championship Series started on September 16 and ended September 22.

The regular season started on August 1, with the New York Heights hosting the Los Angeles Queens.

== Standings ==
Women's Pro Baseball League
Team	W	L	Pct.	GB	Home	Road
San Francisco Firebells	10	5	.667	—	6‍–‍2	4‍–‍3
New York Heights	8	7	.533	2	2‍–‍5	6‍–‍2
Los Angeles Queens	8	7	.533	2	5‍–‍2	3‍–‍5
Boston Hunters	4	11	.267	6	1‍–‍7	3‍–‍4

New York clinched second place in the league and home advantage in the first round of playoffs following its 3–2 season series win over Los Angeles.

== Postseason ==
2026 Women's Pro Baseball League postseason

Tournament details
- Dates: September 9 – September 22, 2026
- Teams: 4

Final positions
- Champions: Los Angeles Queens
- Runners-up: San Francisco Firebells

Awards
- MVP: Ayami Sato (Los Angeles)

The postseason started on September 9 and ended on September 22. All four teams played in the postseason, following a four-team bracket where seeding was based on their ranking in the standings (1 seed vs. 4 seed, 2 seed vs. 3 seed). The winners of the first round, best-of-three semifinals faced off in a best-of-five championship series. The postseason began on September 9.

=== Teams ===
All four teams qualified for the postseason:

1. San Francisco Firebells – 10–5
2. New York Heights – 8–7 (3–2 head-to-head vs. LA)
3. Los Angeles Queens – 8–7 (2–3 head-to-head vs. NY)
4. Boston Hunters – 4–11

=== Playoff bracket ===
Semifinals
1	San Francisco	2
4	Boston	0
2	New York	1
3	Los Angeles	2

Championship
1	San Francisco	2
3	Los Angeles	3

=== Series A ===
==== (1) San Francisco Firebells vs. (4) Boston Hunters ====
San Francisco won the series, 2–0.

Game	Date	Score	Location	Time	Attendance
1	September 9	Boston Hunters – 4, San Francisco Firebells – 6	Robin Roberts Stadium	-	-
2	September 11	Boston Hunters – 6, San Francisco Firebells – 9	Robin Roberts Stadium	-	-

=== Series B ===
==== (2) New York Heights vs. (3) Los Angeles Queens ====
Los Angeles won the series, 2–1.

Game	Date	Score	Location	Time	Attendance
1	September 10	Los Angeles Queens – 10, New York Heights – 3	Robin Roberts Stadium	-	-
2	September 12	Los Angeles Queens – 7, New York Heights – 9	Robin Roberts Stadium	-	-
3	September 14	Los Angeles Queens – 15, New York Heights – 11	Robin Roberts Stadium	-	-

=== 2026 Championship Series ===
==== (1) San Francisco Firebells vs. (3) Los Angeles Queens ====
Los Angeles won the series, 3–2.

Game	Date	Score	Location	Time	Attendance
1	September 16	Los Angeles Queens – 7, San Francisco Firebells – 6	Robin Roberts Stadium	-	-
2	September 17	Los Angeles Queens – 11, San Francisco Firebells – 7	Robin Roberts Stadium	-	-
3	September 19	San Francisco Firebells – 10, Los Angeles Queens – 5	Robin Roberts Stadium	-	-
4	September 20	San Francisco Firebells – 17, Los Angeles Queens – 4	Robin Roberts Stadium	-	-
5	September 22	Los Angeles Queens – 2, San Francisco Firebells – 0	Robin Roberts Stadium	-	-

== Managerial changes ==
=== In-season ===
Team	Former manager	Reason for leaving	New manager	Notes
Boston Hunters	Keith Foulke	Fired	Jemile Weeks	On August 9, after a 1–2 (.333) start to the season, the Hunters replaced Keith Foulke with Jemile Weeks, effective immediately, 30 minutes prior to their fourth game of the season.

== League leaders ==
Hitting leaders
Stat	Player	Total
AVG	Denae Benites^{1} (NY)	.552
OPS	Denae Benites (NY)	1.752
HR	Denae Benites^{1} (NY); Kelsie Whitmore (SF)	11
RBI	Denae Benites^{1} (NY)	38
R	Denae Benites (NY)	25
H	Denae Benites (NY)	32
SB	Denae Benites (NY)	15

^{1} WPBL batting triple crown winner

Pitching leaders
Stat	Player	Total
W	Liz Gilder (SF); Jaida Lee (NY); Claire O'Sullivan (NY); Michelle Roche (LA); Kelsie Whitmore (SF)	3
L	Alli Schroder (BOS)	4
ERA	Meggie Meidlinger (LA)	1.83
K	Jaida Lee (NY)	23
IP	Gigi Schiano (BOS)	26.2
SV	none	0
WHIP	Meggie Meidlinger (LA)	0.98

== Milestones ==
- Denae Benites (NY):
  - Hit the first home run in league history, on August 1.
  - Won the regular season triple crown, leading the league in batting average, runs batted in, and home runs, sharing the lead with Whitmore in home runs.
- Kelsie Whitmore (SF):
  - Had the first three-home-run game in league history, in a San Francisco win over Los Angeles on August 12.
- Andréanne Leblanc (SF):
  - Had the first walk-off hit in league history, a go-ahead grand slam in a win over New York on August 30.

== Venue ==
Every game this season is taking place at Robin Roberts Stadium in Springfield, Illinois.

== Uniforms ==
Along with team identities, all team uniforms were announced on July 8, 2026. Each team has a home, away, and an alternate uniform inspired by their team namesakes.

== Broadcasting ==
On July 30, 2026, ESPN announced that they secured media rights for all regular season and postseason games in the United States and U.S. territories, while Scripps Sports Network announced they will broadcast 11 games on their network.

On July 31, the WPBL announced that outside the United States, all games will be streamed for free on YouTube.

ESPN and YouTube (internationally) streamed the entire Women's Pro Baseball League postseason.

== See also ==
- 2026 in baseball
