= Hyeonah Kim =

South Korean professional baseball player (born 2000)

Boston Hunters – No. 7
- Catcher
- Born: June 24, 2000 (age 26)
- Bats: Right Throws: Right

WPBL debut
- August 2, 2026, for the Boston Hunters
- Stats at Baseball Reference

Teams
- Boston Hunters (2026–present)
Medals
Women's baseball
Representing South Korea
Women's Baseball Asian Cup
Bronze medal – third place	2023 Hong Kong	Team

Hyeonah Kim (born June 24, 2000) is a South Korean professional baseball player. Kim is currently a catcher for the Boston Hunters of the Women's Pro Baseball League. She plays for the South Korea women's national baseball team in international competition.

== Early life and education ==
Kim is from Seoul, South Korea. She attended Ewha Womans University, where she served as a playing coach of the Ewha Playgirls, the only collegiate women's baseball team in South Korea.

== International career ==
=== Asian Cup ===
In the 2023 Women's Baseball Asian Cup, Kim played third base and won bronze with the rest of the South Korean team. She scored 10 hits during the tournament, more than any other player.

In the 2025 Asian Cup, Kim was moved to catcher. Despite South Korea's fourth place finish, Kim won best scorer with a .409 average and 15 RBI.

=== Women's World Cup ===
Kim played in the infield during the group stage of the 2024 Women's Baseball World Cup, where South Korea was unable to win any games. In the 2027 Women's World Cup group A, South Korea finished in fourth out of six teams, eliminating them from competition.

== Professional career ==
In the 2025 Women's Pro Baseball League draft, Kim was selected first by WPBL Boston (later renamed the Boston Hunters) and fourth overall. She made her league debut on August 2, 2026, during the Hunters' first game.
