= Braidy Birdsall =

Canadian baseball player

Boston Hunters
- 2B
- Bats: Right Throws: Right

WPBL debut
- 2026, for the Boston Hunters

Teams
- Boston Hunters (2026–present)

Braidy Birdsall is a Canadian professional baseball infielder. She did martial arts for 13 years growing up in Saskatoon, is attending Laurentian University for sports psychology, and currently plays for the Boston Hunters of the Women's Pro Baseball League.
