= Amanda Gianelloni =

American baseball player (born 1997)

San Francisco Firebells – No. 5
- Second baseman
- Born: February 17, 1997 (age 29); Thibodaux, Louisiana, U.S.
- Bats: Right Throws: Right

WPBL debut
- San Francisco Firebells
- Stats at Baseball Reference
Medals
Women's baseball
Representing United States
Women's Baseball World Cup
Silver medal – second place	2024 Canada	Team competition

Amanda Gianelloni (born February 17, 1997) is an American professional baseball player. She is currently a second baseman for the San Francisco Firebells of the Women's Pro Baseball League.

== Early life and education ==
Gianelloni was born in Thibodaux, Louisiana. She attended Assumption High School in Napoleonville.

Gianelloni attended Nicholls State University. She graduated with a Bachelor of Science in marketing in 2018 and a Master of Business Administration in 2021. She played shortstop for the Nicholls Colonels softball team, where she set the program record for career RBIs. In 2024, she was inducted to the Nicholls Athletics Hall of Fame.

== Professional career ==
Gianelloni was added to the United States women's national baseball team roster in 2016. At the 2024 Women's Baseball World Cup, she won the silver medal with the rest of the national team.

She is the first woman baseball player to be featured onSportCenter's Top Ten Plays.

In the inaugural Women's Pro Baseball League draft, Gianelloni was selected eighth overall by WPBL San Francisco. On November 21, 2025, she became the first player to officially sign with the league.

== Personal life ==
Gianelloni married Victoria Price in 2024.
