= Japan Women's Baseball League =

Women's baseball league in Japan

- Sport: Baseball
- Founded: 17 August 2009
- CEO: Takahiro Hikosō
- No. of teams: 4
- Country: Japan
- Most recent champion: Kyoto Flora
- Most titles: Aichi Dione (4)

The Japan Women's Baseball League (Japanese: 日本女子プロ野球リーグ, Hepburn: Nihon Joshi Puro Yakyū Rīgu), formerly Girls Professional Baseball League until 2012, was the highest level of women's baseball in Japan. The league folded in 2021, holding its final season in 2019.

== History ==
=== 2019 ===
On 26 August, it was announced that the league would suffer from severe contraction if new investors were not found and crowd number would not increase. On 9 November, it was announced that over half of the league's players had been released ahead of the 2020 season. In December 2021, the league announced it would shut down indefinitely.

== Teams ==
Team	Location	Former names	Team color
Saitama Astraia	Saitama	East Astraia (2013–14)	
Aichi Dione	Aichi	Hyogo Swing Smileys (2010–12); South Dione (2013–14); Hyogo Dione (2015–17)	
Kyoto Flora	Kyoto	Kyoto Asto Dreams (2010–12); West Flora (2013–14)	
Reia	Kyoto	Osaka Brabee Honeys (2012); North Reia (2013–'14); Tohoku Reia (2015)	

VICTORIA SERIES
Team	Participation team	Team color
All West Japan	West Flora, South Dione	
All East Japan	East Astraia, North Reia	
