= Beth Greenwood =

American baseball player (born 1999)

Boston Hunters – No. 17
- Catcher/Coach
- Born: October 19, 1999 (age 26)
- Bats: Right Throws: Right

WPBL debut
- August 2, 2026, for the Boston Hunters
- Stats at Baseball Reference

Teams
- Boston Hunters (2026–present)
Medals
Women's baseball
Representing United States
Women's Baseball World Cup
Silver medal – second place	2024 Canada	Team

Elizabeth Greenwood (born October 19, 1999) is an American professional baseball catcher and coach. She currently plays and coaches for the Boston Hunters of the Women's Pro Baseball League.

== Early life and education ==
Greenwood was raised in Amherst, New Hampshire. She attended Souhegan High School, where she was a catcher on the baseball team.

Greenwood attended the University of Rochester, where she played for the baseball team and studied electrical engineering. As a Yellowjacket, she was the first female baseball player in university history and the first American female to catch in an NCAA baseball game. She graduated in 2022.

== Player career ==
Greenwood joined the United States women's national baseball team development roster in 2018. She made the official roster in 2023.

Greenwood was selected by WPBL Boston in the third round of the inaugural Women’s Pro Baseball League draft.

== Coaching career ==
After graduating in 2022, Greenwood spent two years as a Baseball Research and Development Fellow and development coach for the Jersey Shore BlueClaws, the High-A affiliate of the Philadelphia Phillies. During the 2025-26 school year, Greenwood was a pitching coach with the baseball program at Vassar College.

On July 29, 2026, it was announced that Greenwood would serve on the Boston Hunters coaching staff.

== Activism ==
Greenwood is on the board of Baseball for All (BFA), a non-profit which provides women and girls opportunities to play baseball. In 2026, Greenwood worked with BFA to host the largest girls' youth baseball tournament in the United States.

== Personal life ==
Greenwood is LGBTQ+.
