= Andréanne Leblanc =

Canadian baseball player (born 2001)

San Francisco Firebells – No. 16
- First base
- Born: August 6, 2001 (age 25)
- Bats: Switch Throws: Right

WPBL debut
- August 2, 2026, for the San Francisco Firebells
- Stats at Baseball Reference

Teams
- San Francisco Firebells (2026–present)
Medals
Women's baseball
Representing Canada
Women's Baseball World Cup
Bronze medal – third place	2024 Canada	Team

Andréanne Leblanc (born August 6, 2001) is a Canadian professional baseball player. She currently plays first base for the San Francisco Firebells of the Women's Pro Baseball League.

== Early life ==
Leblanc is originally from Mont-Saint-Hilaire, Quebec and speaks both Canadian French and English.

== National career ==
Leblanc has played for the Quebec women's provincial baseball team since 2018. She was a member of the team when they won gold at the Baseball Canada Women's Championships in 2023 and 2024.

== International career ==
Leblanc has played for the Canada women's national baseball team since 2024. In the 2024 Women's Baseball World Cup, she scored 7 runs batted in, tying with 2 other players for the most in the tournament, and won the bronze medal with the rest of the Canadian team.

== Professional career ==
In the 2025 WPBL draft, Leblanc was selected 32nd overall by WPBL San Francisco (later renamed the San Francisco Firebells).

On August 30, 2026, Leblanc hit both the first walk-off home run and the first grand slam in league history. She also lead the league in putouts, scoring 97 during the regular season.
