= Jamie Mackay =

American professional baseball catcher (born 2003)

Los Angeles Queens – No. 20
- Catcher
- Born: April 28, 2003 (age 23).
- Bats: Right Throws: Right

WPBL debut
- Aug 1, 2026, for the Los Angeles Queens

Teams
- Los Angeles Queens (2026–present)

Career highlights and awards
- WPBL Champion (2026)

Jamie Mackay (born April 28, 2003) is an American professional baseball catcher. She currently plays for the Los Angeles Queens of the Women's Pro Baseball League.

== Early life and education ==
Mackay was raised in Laguna Beach, California and attended Pacifica Christian High School, where she played baseball and basketball.

Mackay played three seasons of softball at Ole Miss, and is currently playing her second year with the South Carolina Gamecocks.

== Professional career ==
In the debut WPBL draft, Mackay was selected 23rd overall by WPBL Los Angeles (later renamed the Los Angeles Queens). In the 2026 WPBL regular season, Mackay led the Queens in home runs (5) and runs batted in (17). She also served as a relief pitcher for the Queens, pitching in five regular season games and throwing 5 2/3 innings in the first game of the championship series. The Queens would go on to win the first WPBL championship title.
