= Jemile Weeks =

American baseball player (born 1987)

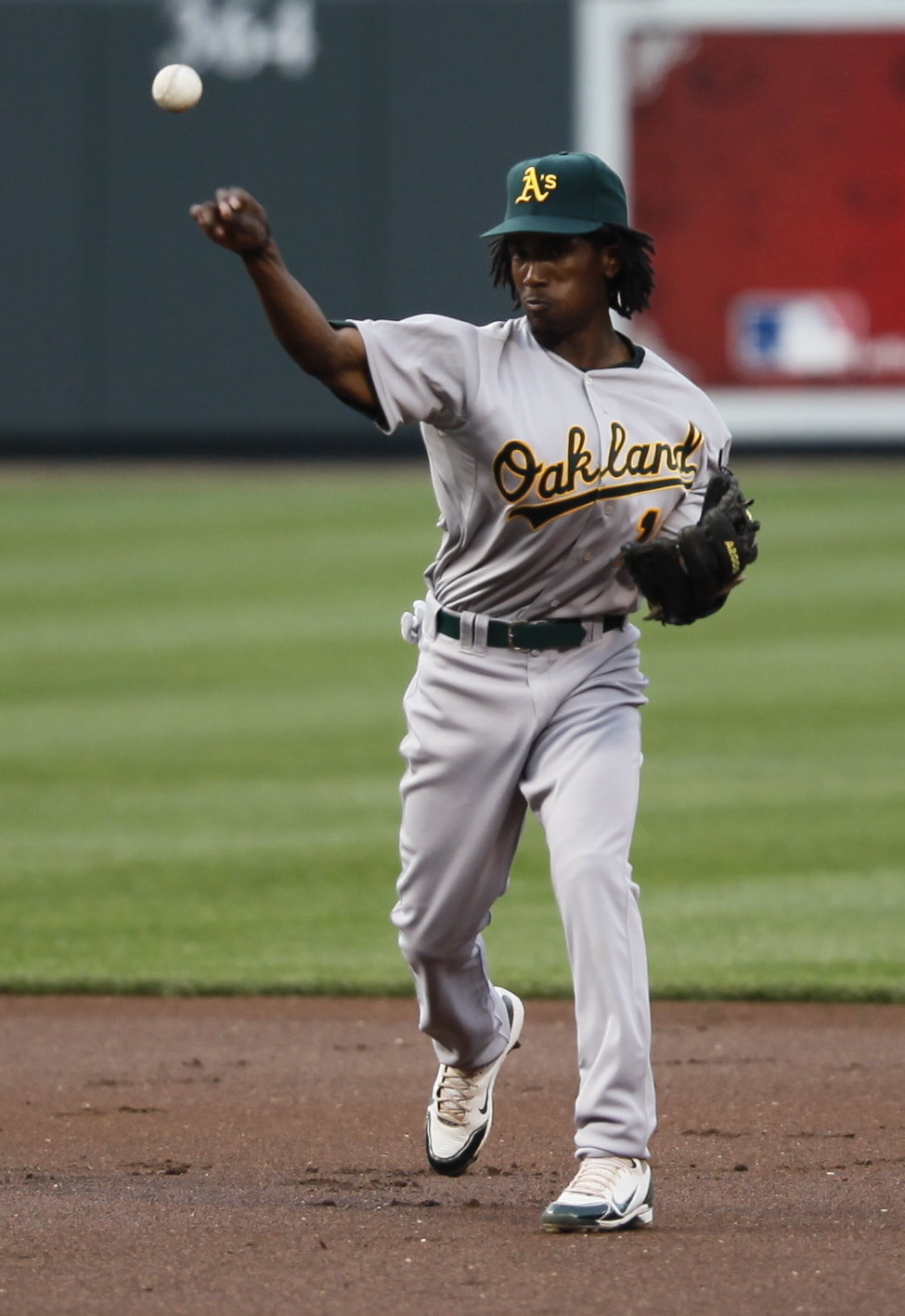
- Weeks with the Oakland Athletics, 2011

Boston Hunters
- Second baseman / Outfielder / Manager
- Born: January 26, 1987 (age 39); Orlando, Florida, U.S.
- Batted: Switch Threw: Right

MLB debut
- June 7, 2011, for the Oakland Athletics

Last MLB appearance
- May 7, 2016, for the San Diego Padres

MLB statistics
- Batting average: .254
- Home runs: 4
- Runs batted in: 62
- Stolen bases: 41
- Stats at Baseball Reference

Teams
- Oakland Athletics (2011–2013); Baltimore Orioles (2014); Boston Red Sox (2014–2015); San Diego Padres (2016)
Medals
Men's baseball
Representing United States
World University Championship
Gold medal – first place	2006 Havana	Team

Jemile Nykiwa Weeks (/dʒəˈmaɪl/ jə-MYLE; born January 26, 1987) is an American former professional baseball second baseman and outfielder who is currently the manager for the Boston Hunters of the Women's Pro Baseball League (WPBL). He has played in Major League Baseball (MLB) for the Oakland Athletics, Baltimore Orioles, Boston Red Sox, and San Diego Padres.

He is the younger brother of former MLB second baseman Rickie Weeks. He played college baseball at the University of Miami.

== Amateur career ==
Weeks attended Lake Brantley High School in Altamonte Springs, Florida. At Altamonte Springs, Weeks hit .472 as a junior and led the team to a conference title, and also won All-State honors twice. Weeks also went 3-3 with a home run in the 2005 PlayStation All-America Baseball Game and played football for two seasons. Weeks then attended the University of Miami. As a freshman, Weeks hit .352 and was named a Louisville Slugger Freshman All-American. In his junior and final season for Miami, Weeks hit .363 with 13 home runs and a .641 slugging percentage.

Weeks was selected by the Milwaukee Brewers in the eighth round of the 2005 Major League Baseball draft, but he chose, instead, to attend the University of Miami. He played college baseball for the Miami Hurricanes.

== Professional career ==
=== Oakland Athletics ===
The Oakland Athletics then selected him twelfth overall in the 2008 Major League Baseball draft.

Weeks was batting .297 in nineteen games for the Kane County Cougars in 2008 when a torn hip flexor ended his season. He played fall ball with the Phoenix Desert Dogs in 2009, and was named an Arizona Fall League Rising Star. At the start of the 2010 season, Weeks was ranked seventh in Oakland's farm system according to Baseball America and appeared as a non-roster invitee for the Athletics in spring 2011.

He was called up to the majors for the first time on June 7, 2011. He won the MLB Rookie of the Month Award for the American League in June 2011. He batted .309, with seven doubles, three triples, six RBIs, and six stolen bases in this month.

In 2012, Weeks hit .220 with 14 doubles, 8 triples, 2 homers, 20 RBIs, 50 walks, and 15 stolen bases. On August 22, 2012, Weeks was demoted to the Triple-A's Sacramento River Cats when the A's activated outfielder Seth Smith and acquired Stephen Drew from the Arizona Diamondbacks.

=== Baltimore Orioles ===
On December 2, 2013, Weeks and a player to be named later (PTBNL) were traded to the Baltimore Orioles for pitcher Jim Johnson. The PTBNL was identified as David Freitas on December 12. He played in only three games for Baltimore, going 3–for–11 (.273). Weeks split 73 games in the minor leagues between the rookie–level Gulf Coast League Orioles, Low–A Aberdeen IronBirds, and Triple–A Norfolk Tides, accumulating a .303/.411/.427 batting line with one home run, 22 RBI, and 10 stolen bases.

=== Boston Red Sox ===
The Orioles traded Weeks and Iván DeJesús Jr. to the Boston Red Sox in exchange for Michael Almanzar and Kelly Johnson on August 30, 2014. On December 8, he was removed from the 40–man roster and outrighted to the Triple–A Pawtucket Red Sox.

=== San Diego Padres ===
On January 14, 2016, Weeks signed a minor league contract with the San Diego Padres that included an invitation to spring training. He began the season with the El Paso Chihuahuas of the Triple-A Pacific Coast League, and was promoted to the major leagues on April 20. In 17 games with Padres, Weeks hit only .140 with 2 runs batted in and one stolen base. On October 26, Weeks was removed from the 40–man roster and sent outright to Triple–A, but rejected the assignment in favor of free agency.

=== Chicago Cubs ===
On December 22, 2016, Weeks signed a minor league contract with the Chicago Cubs organization. In 63 games he hit .235 with 2 home runs and 24 runs batted in for the Triple-A Iowa Cubs. He elected free agency following the season on November 6, 2017.

=== Acereros de Monclova ===
On February 13, 2018, Weeks signed with the Acereros de Monclova of the Mexican Baseball League. He was released on July 3, 2018.
