= Boston Hunters =

Women's professional baseball team for Boston

Logo
Cap insignia

Information
- League: Women's Pro Baseball League (WPBL)
- Location: Boston, Massachusetts
- Ballpark: Robin Roberts Stadium (2026–present)
- Founded: 2025
- Colors: Green; Orange; Cream
- Manager: Jemile Weeks
- Coach: Karavin Dew; Beth Greenwood
- Website: www.womensprobaseballleague.com/teams/boston

The Boston Hunters are a professional women's baseball team for Boston that competes in the Women's Pro Baseball League (WPBL). The team is named for physician and women's rights activist Harriot Hunt. Its main color is green, like Boston Legacy FC, the Boston Fleet, and the Boston Celtics. Its logo is an osprey clasping a baseball bat. The Hunters are one of the four inaugural teams of the WPBL, alongside the Los Angeles Queens, New York Heights, and San Francisco Firebells.

== History ==
=== Founding ===
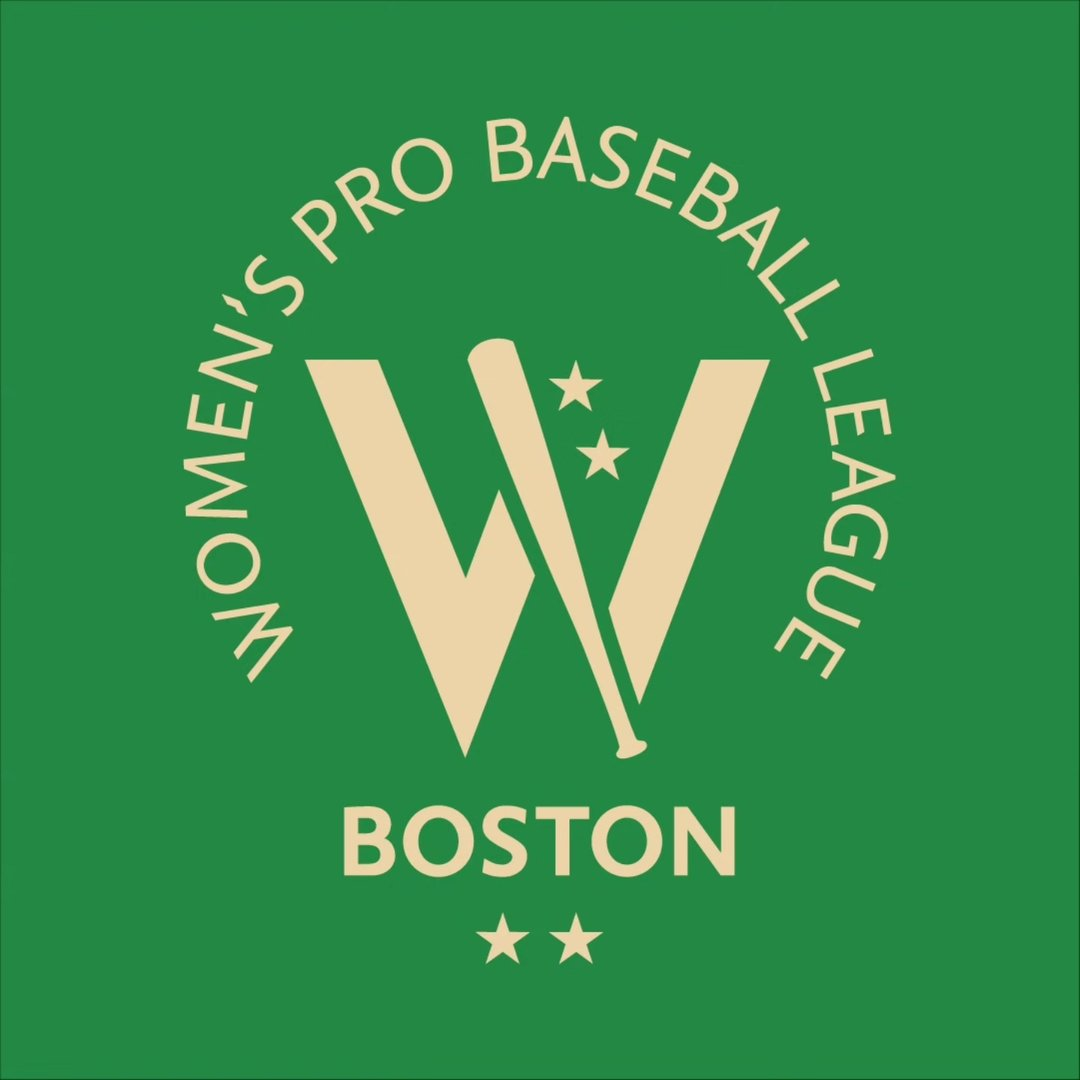
The provisional logo used by the WPBL prior to revealing the team's identity

On October 21, 2025, the WPBL announced that Boston would be one of the league's four inaugural teams, alongside New York, San Francisco, and Los Angeles. Boston was chosen because of its loyal baseball fan base and rich history.

In November 2025, the team selected catcher Hyeonah Kim of South Korea with the fourth overall pick of the inaugural WPBL draft. The team's first manager was Keith Foulke, a former relief pitcher for the Boston Red Sox.

=== 2026 season ===
The Hunters are not playing in Boston in the 2026 WPBL season. Instead, Robin Roberts Stadium in Springfield, Illinois, serves as a neutral venue for the season. League co-founder Keith Stein has stated that there is a chance of home games being introduced in subsequent seasons.

After losing two of their first three games, the Hunters announced that former Red Sox second baseman Jemile Weeks would replace Keith Foulke as manager.

== Team identity ==
When revealed, the team used the working name WPBL Boston. On July 8, 2026, the team received the name "Boston Hunters" after physician, women's rights activist, and Boston native Harriot Kezia Hunt.

The Hunters' logo is an osprey clasping a baseball bat. The team's main color is green, like Boston Legacy FC, the Boston Fleet, and the Boston Celtics.

== Current roster ==
Boston Hunters roster
Active roster	Coaching staff
Pitchers: -- (Australia) Allie Bebbere; 12 (United States) Paloma Benach; -- (United States) Olivia Bricker; 18 (Canada) Maïka Dumais; -- (United Kingdom) Laura Hirai; 3 (Canada) Raine Padgham; -- (United States) Nylah Ramirez; 31 (United States) Gigi Schiano; 16 (Canada) Alli Schroder; Catchers: 17 (United States) Beth Greenwood; 7 (South Korea) Hyeonah Kim; -- (United States) Clara Rice; Infielders: -- (Canada) Braidy Birdsall; 4 (United States) Kate Blunt; 2 (United States) Denver Bryant; 25 (Mexico) Edith De Leija; -- (United States) Nadia Diaz; 33 (United States) Gabrielle Haas; -- (United States) Meaghan Houk; 30 (Mexico) Maria José Valenzuela; -- (United States) Luciana Moreno; 22 (United States) Sabrina Robinson; 5 (Japan) Suzuka Yamamoto; -- (United States) Sadie Zion; Outfielders: -- (Canada) Emily Baxter; -- (United States) Stephanie Everett; 13 (Australia) Ticara Geldenhuis; 14 (United States) Lexi Hastings; -- (United States) Mary Grace O'Neill; 55 (Australia) Molly Paddison	Manager: -- Jemile Weeks; Coaches: 6 Karavin Dew; 17 Beth Greenwood; Roster updated August 15, 2026: Disabled list; ‡ Inactive list; § Suspended list
