= San Francisco Firebells =

Women's professional baseball team for San Francisco

Logo
Cap insignia

Information
- League: Women's Pro Baseball League (WPBL)
- Location: San Francisco, California
- Ballpark: Robin Roberts Stadium (2026–present)
- Founded: 2025
- WPBL pennant (1): 2026
- Colors: Purple; Orange; Lavender
- Manager: Matt Williams
- Coach: Jeff Inglin; Sam Unger
- Website: www.womensprobaseballleague.com/teams/san-francisco/

The San Francisco Firebells are a professional women's baseball team for San Francisco that competes in the Women's Pro Baseball League (WPBL). The team is named for historical volunteer firefighter Lillie "Firebelle Lil" Hitchcock Coit. Its main color is purple, like the Golden State Valkyries, and its logo fuses a bell with a phoenix. The Firebells are one of the four inaugural teams of the WPBL, alongside the Boston Hunters, Los Angeles Queens, and New York Heights.

== History ==
=== Founding ===
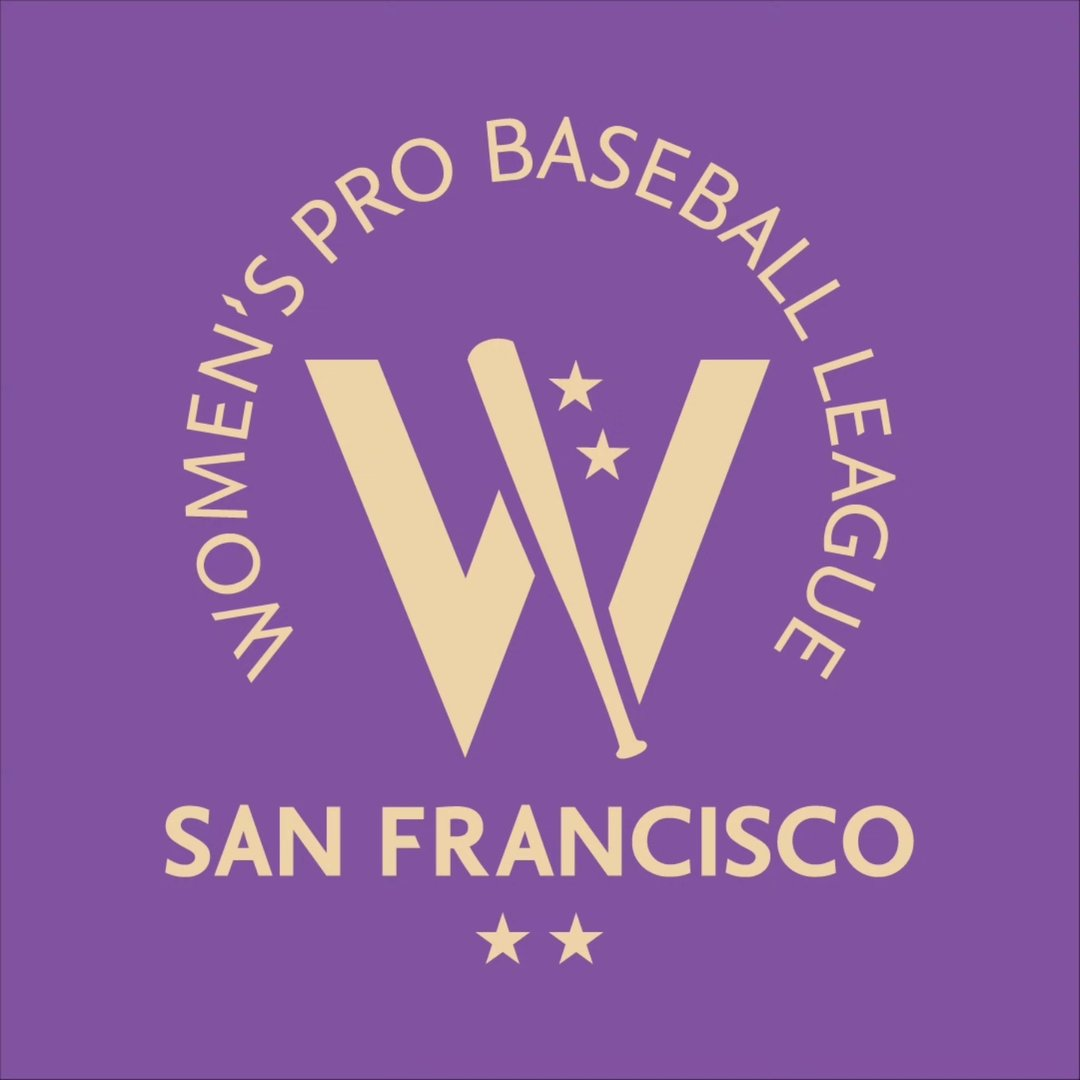
The provisional logo used by the WPBL prior to revealing the team's identity

On October 21, 2025, the WPBL announced that San Francisco would have one of the league's four inaugural teams, alongside Boston, New York, and Los Angeles. San Francisco was chosen because of its reputation of supporting baseball and women's sports. In 2025, the city's Golden State Valkyries set the WNBA single-season home attendance record in the team's first season, and the neighboring Bay FC set the single-game attendance record in American professional women's sports history in its second season.

In November 2025, the team selected Kelsie Whitmore with the first overall pick of the inaugural WPBL draft. The team's first manager is Matt Williams, a former third baseman for the San Francisco Giants. Williams had previously managed the Washington Nationals from 2014 to 2015 and the Kia Tigers from 2020 to 2021.

=== 2026 season ===
The Firebells are not playing in San Francisco in the 2026 WPBL season. Instead, Robin Roberts Stadium in Springfield, Illinois, serves as a neutral venue for the season. League co-founder Keith Stein has stated that there is a chance of exhibition games being played at the four cities, with Oracle Park being a possibility.

The team's first game was on August 2, in which they won 11–3 over the Boston Hunters. The Firebells then lost a game to the New York Heights and split two games against the Los Angeles Queens. Watch parties were held across the Bay Area during the first week of play, and a San Francisco women's sports bar plans to show all Firebells games.

== Team identity ==
When revealed, the team used the working name WPBL San Francisco. On July 8, 2026, the team received the name "San Francisco Firebells" after Lillie Hitchcock Coit, who was nicknamed "Firebelle Lil" due to her devotion to San Francisco's volunteer firefighters.

The Firebells' logo fuses a bell with a phoenix. The team's main color is purple, like the Golden State Valkyries.

== Current roster ==
San Francisco Firebells roster
| Active roster | | Coaching staff |
|---|---|---|
| Pitchers: 18 (United States) Jill Albayati; 2 (United States) Peyton Coria; 22 (United States) Niki Eckert; 10 (Canada) Liz Gilder; -- (United States) Kiley Ingram; -- (United States) Arwen McCullough; -- (United States) Katie Reynolds; -- (Mexico) Flor Elena Valerio Montoya; 3 (United States) Kelsie Whitmore | Catchers: 33 (United States) Samantha Gutierrez; -- (United States) Scrappy Hopkins; 26 (United States) Alexia Jorge; -- (Mexico) Esthela Segovia; Infielders: -- (United States) Kaija Bazzano; -- (United States) Kailyn Bearpaw; 8 (Japan) Hinano Beppu; 25 (Canada) Ela Day-Bédard; 5 (United States) Amanda Gianelloni; -- (United States) Kaelei Kajitani; -- (United States) Allie Lacey; 16 (Canada) Andréanne Leblanc; 13 (United States) Joely Leguizamon; -- (United States) Micaela Minner; 7 (South Korea) Jua Park; 6 (Japan) Ayaka Yamamoto; Outfielders: 57 (Mexico) Rosi del Castillo; -- (United States) Bella Espinoza-Molina; 1 (United States) Jordan Eyster; 21 (United States) Skylar Kaplan | Manager: 4 Matt Williams; Coaches: 12 Jeff Inglin; 11 Sam Unger; Roster updated on July 30, 2026: Disabled list; ‡ Inactive list; § Suspended list |
