= Olivia Bricker =

American baseball player (born 2000)

Boston Hunters – No. 26
- Pitcher
- Born: August 23, 2000 (age 26)
- Bats: Left Throws: Left

WPBL debut
- 2026, for the Boston Hunters

Teams
- Boston Hunters (2026–present)

Olivia Bricker is an American professional baseball pitcher. She has played baseball since she was four years old and was the first girl in Ohio to play varsity baseball at the high school level, playing for Clermont Northeastern High School. Bricker currently plays for the Boston Hunters of the Women's Pro Baseball League.
