= Ayami Sato =

Japanese baseball player (born 1989)

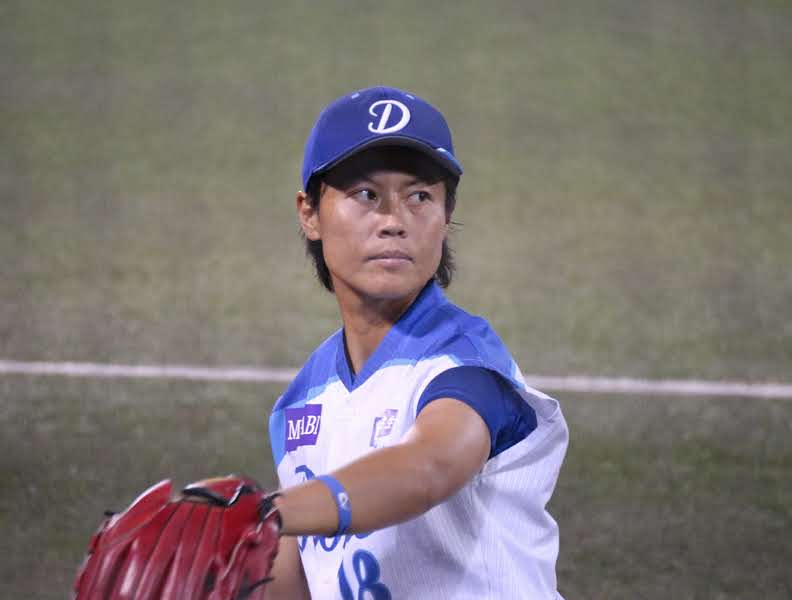

Los Angeles Queens – No. 18
- Pitcher
- Born: December 21, 1989 (age 36); Amami, Kagoshima, Japan
- Bats: Right Throws: Right
- Stats at Baseball Reference

Teams
- North Reia (2013–2014); Hyogo / Aichi Dione (2015–2024); Toronto Maple Leafs (2025); Los Angeles Queens (2026–present)

Career highlights and awards
- WPBL Champion (2026); Women's Baseball World Cup MVP: 2014, 2016, 2018; Women's Baseball World Cup All-Tournament team: 2010, 2012, 2016, 2014 WBSC Player of the Year

Ayami Sato
Medal record

Women's baseball

Representing Japan

Women's Baseball World Cup
Gold medal – first place	2010 Venezuela	Team
Gold medal – first place	2012 Canada	Team
Gold medal – first place	2014 Japan	Team
Gold medal – first place	2016 South Korea	Team
Gold medal – first place	2018 USA	Team
Gold medal – first place	2024 Canada/Japan	Team

Ayami Sato (里 綾実, Sato Ayami; born December 21, 1989) is a Japanese professional baseball pitcher for the Los Angeles Queens of the Women's Pro Baseball League. She formerly played for the Toronto Maple Leafs of the Canadian Baseball League (CBL) for the 2025 season, becoming the first female player in the league. She is also a starting pitcher for the Japan women’s national baseball team, with which she has won six gold medals at the Women's Baseball World Cup.

Sato is considered by many to be the best female pitcher, and by some the best female baseball player, in the world. She can throw close to 80 mph (130 km/h). Her curveball was clocked at 2,583 revolutions per minute. Sato has won six gold medals for her home country. She is the only women's baseball player to have won three consecutive World Cup MVP awards.

== Early life ==
Sato attended Kamimura Gakuen High School in Ichikikushikino, Kagoshima, Japan. She then attended Shobi University in Kawagoe, Saitama where she played on her college women’s baseball team.

Sato began playing baseball with her older brother at the age of 9. At the time, there was no women’s team in Japan. "I played against boys, and then I wanted to be them," Sato emphasized through a translator. She credits an elementary teacher for showing her how to throw a slider and curveball.

Sato was drawn to the control and constant action of being a pitcher. "I love to pitch because the pitcher is in the spotlight," Sato said. "I like being in control."

As a high school player, Sato claims she was nothing particularly special. However, in college she connected with pitching coach Hiroshi Shintani, who showed her how to let go and just have fun. "It broadened my mind more and more" she said. "And I learned how to enjoy it."

Her family was supportive when she decided to become a professional pitcher. Sato left home when she was in high school, "so after[wards] ... there was a little distance between the family and [myself]." But her parents would follow along with Sato's career through the media — she played on her college women's team, and joined the Japan Women's League after it was founded in 2009 — and they continue to be "very supportive."

Sato considered giving up on her dream of becoming a professional baseball player many times. There weren't many opportunities for young women who wanted to pursue a career in baseball. However, the Japanese women's league was founded in 2009, just in time for Sato to begin her career.

== Professional career ==
=== Women's World Cup ===
In 2010, at the age of 20, Sato debuted in the 2010 Women’s Baseball World Cup (WBWC), going 3–0 with a 0.53 ERA, beating Puerto Rico and shutting out Venezuela. She then beat the United States, only allowing two hits and no walks, and in effect eliminating them from a shot at the gold. Japan won the title that year, and Sato was named the Cup All-Star starting pitcher.

In the 2012 WBWC, Sato was 1–0 with a 0.72 ERA. The Japanese team was undefeated in that tournament and won their third straight gold medal. She was named the best relief pitcher in the tournament.

During the 2014 WBWC she led with two wins, a 0.00 ERA, and 10 strikeouts in 12 innings. She pitched in the gold medal game against the U.S. and outdueled Sarah Hudek. She led her team to a third straight gold medal and received her first MVP award for her dominant performance. At the end of 2014, she was named the World Baseball Softball Confederation Player of the Year, given annually to the best women's or men's baseball player.

In the 2016 WBWC, she had another dominant performance. She led with 21 strikeouts and a 3–0 record, while posting a 1.33 ERA. She was the starting pitcher in the championship game against Canada, pitching a two-hit, one-walk shutout. She received a second consecutive MVP award and was also named the tournament's best starting pitcher.

In the 2018 WBWC, Sato won her third straight MVP award and led Japan to their sixth straight title. With that win, she extended Japan's tournament win streak to 30 games. In the championship game against the U.S., Sato pitched a complete game with only 88 pitches to secure the 21 outs needed. She never allowed an American hitter to reach third base and allowed only one hit. Japan won the game, 3–0.

Sato pitched seven scoreless innings over two games as Japan won the 2023 Women's Baseball Asia Cup.

In the 2024 World Cup, Sato was 2–0 in the group stage in 2023. In the final round, she started once, allowing 3 unearned runs in five innings as Madonna Japan lost their first World Cup game since 2012.

=== Japan Women's Baseball League ===
In 2013, Sato made her debut in the Japan Women’s Baseball League with North Reia. She had a record of 6–10 with a 2.23 ERA in 29 starts. She led the league with 62 strikeouts as a rookie.

She was 11–9 with a save for North Reia in 2014 and led the loop with 66 whiffs. In 2015, she posted a 9–9, 2.43 record when moving to Hyogo Dione after North Reia became a development team. During 2016, she improved to 9–3, 2.17, leading the league in wins and ERA.

Sato led the league in strikeouts three out of the last four seasons, in wins for the past two, and has a 2.31 ERA over that period.

In 2018, Hyogo Dione moved to Aichi from Hyogo and changed their name to Aichi Dione. She left Aichi after the 2019 season. The league would not hold another season and folded in 2021.

=== Saitama Seibu Lady Lions ===
Sato joined the Saitama Seibu Lady Lions when they formed in 2020. The team competes in the amateur Venus League.

=== Intercounty Baseball League ===
On December 3, 2024, the Toronto Maple Leafs of the Intercounty Baseball League announced they had signed Sato, making her the first female player in the Canadian league and the first female player to play professional baseball in Canada. She debuted with Toronto on May 11, 2025. She started 3 games, going 1–0 with a 14.04 ERA.

=== Women's Pro Baseball League ===
On November 20, 2025, Sato was the second overall draft pick at the inaugural Women's Pro Baseball League draft, being chosen by the Los Angeles Queens. The Queens won the inaugural championship series on September 22, 2026. Sato was awarded Championship MVP after throwing the first complete game and first shutout in Women's Pro Baseball League history.
