= Raine Padgham =

Canadian professional baseball pitcher (born 2005)

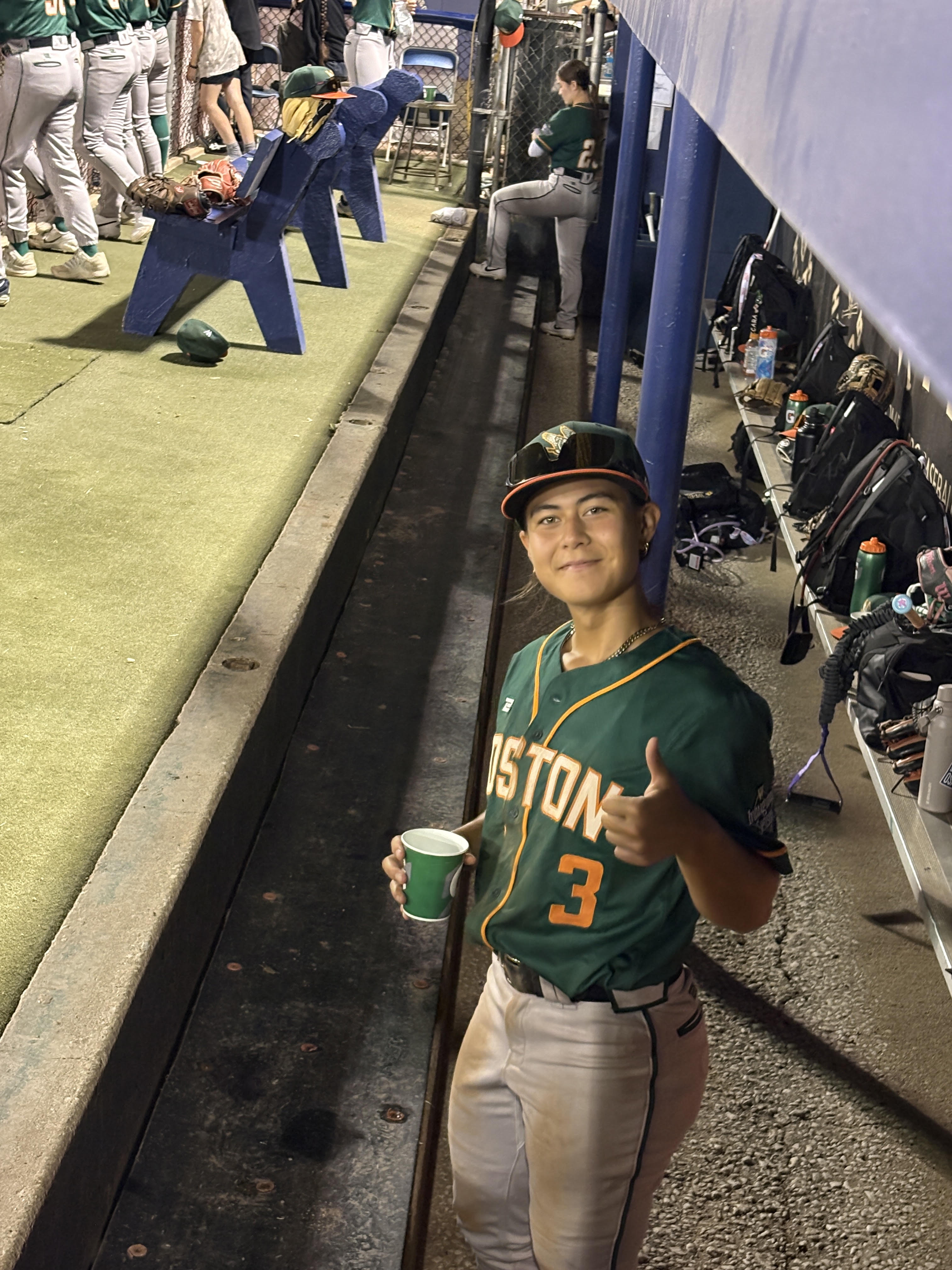
- Padgham in 2026

Boston Hunters
- Pitcher
- Born: Raine Feria Padgham; July 19, 2005 (age 21)
- Bats: Right Throws: Right

WPBL debut
- August 2, 2026, for the Boston Hunters
- Stats at Baseball Reference

Teams
- Boston Hunters (2026–present)
Medals
Women's baseball
Representing Canada
Women's Baseball World Cup
Bronze medal – third place	2024 Canada	Team

Raine Feria Padgham (born July 19, 2005) is a Canadian professional baseball pitcher. She currently pitches for the Boston Hunters of the Women's Pro Baseball League.

== Early life and education ==
Padgham attended Abbotsford Senior Secondary School in Abbotsford, British Columbia. She previously attended Thompson Rivers University. She is currently studying kinesiology at the University of British Columbia.

== Baseball career ==
Padgham began playing baseball when she was three years old, and proved herself an impressive pitcher from a young age. In 2017, Padgham played on both a girls and boys team at the Western Canadian Baseball Championships, becoming the first player to do this. At 13, she was the youngest player ever invited to the Canadian women's prospect team in Okotoks. She received national attention in 2020 when she threw an 83 mph pitch, possibly the fastest ever thrown by a woman, at a Baseball British Columbia High-Performance Camp.

Growing up, she played for both men's and women's teams, including the Abbotsford Cardinals, the Cloverdale Rangers, and Team British Columbia. In 2023, Padgham became the first female player on the Thompson Rivers University baseball team. She currently plays for the University of British Columbia Thunderbirds baseball team.

=== Canadian national team ===
Padgham has pitched for the Canada women's national baseball team since 2022. In the 2024 Women's Baseball World Cup bronze medal match, Padgham pitched to earn the win against Mexico.

In the 2026 Women's Baseball World Cup preliminaries, she pitched a 13-0 game against Hong Kong.

=== Boston Hunters ===
In the inaugural Women's Pro Baseball League draft, Padgham was selected as Boston's third pick and twelfth overall in the first round by WPBL Boston.

On August 2, 2026, Padgham made her WPBL debut as the starting pitcher in the Boston Hunters' first game.

== Personal life ==
Padgham is LGBTQ.
