= Alli Schroder =

Canadian baseball player and firefighter (born 2002)

Boston Hunters – No. 16
- Pitcher
- Born: April 25, 2002 (age 24)
- Bats: Right Throws: Right

WPBL debut
- 2026, for the Boston Hunters
- Stats at Baseball Reference

Teams
- Boston Hunters (2026–present)
Medals
Women's baseball
Representing Canada
Women's Baseball World Cup
Bronze medal – third place	2018 United States	Team
Bronze medal – third place	2024 Canada	Team

Allison Paige Schroder (born April 25, 2002) is a Canadian firefighter and professional baseball pitcher. She currently plays for the Boston Hunters of the Women's Pro Baseball League, and is their team captain.

== Early life and education ==
Schroder was raised in Fruitvale, British Columbia. She attended J. Lloyd Crowe Secondary School.

Schroder attended Vancouver Island University, where she studied environmental science. As a member of the VIU Mariners baseball team, she became the first female player in the Canadian College Baseball Conference.

Since 2021, Schroder has been a firefighter with the BC Wildfire Service.

== Professional career ==
The Canada women's national baseball team added Schroder to its roster in 2016. With the rest of the national team, Schroder won bronze medals at both the 2018 and 2024 Women's Baseball World Cups.

In June 2026, Schroder became the first female player at the Grand Forks International baseball tournament.

In the inaugural Women's Pro Baseball League draft, Schroder was drafted fifth overall by WPBL Boston. On July 31, 2026, it was announced that she would serve as the team's captain.
