= Kelsie Whitmore =

American baseball player (born 1998)

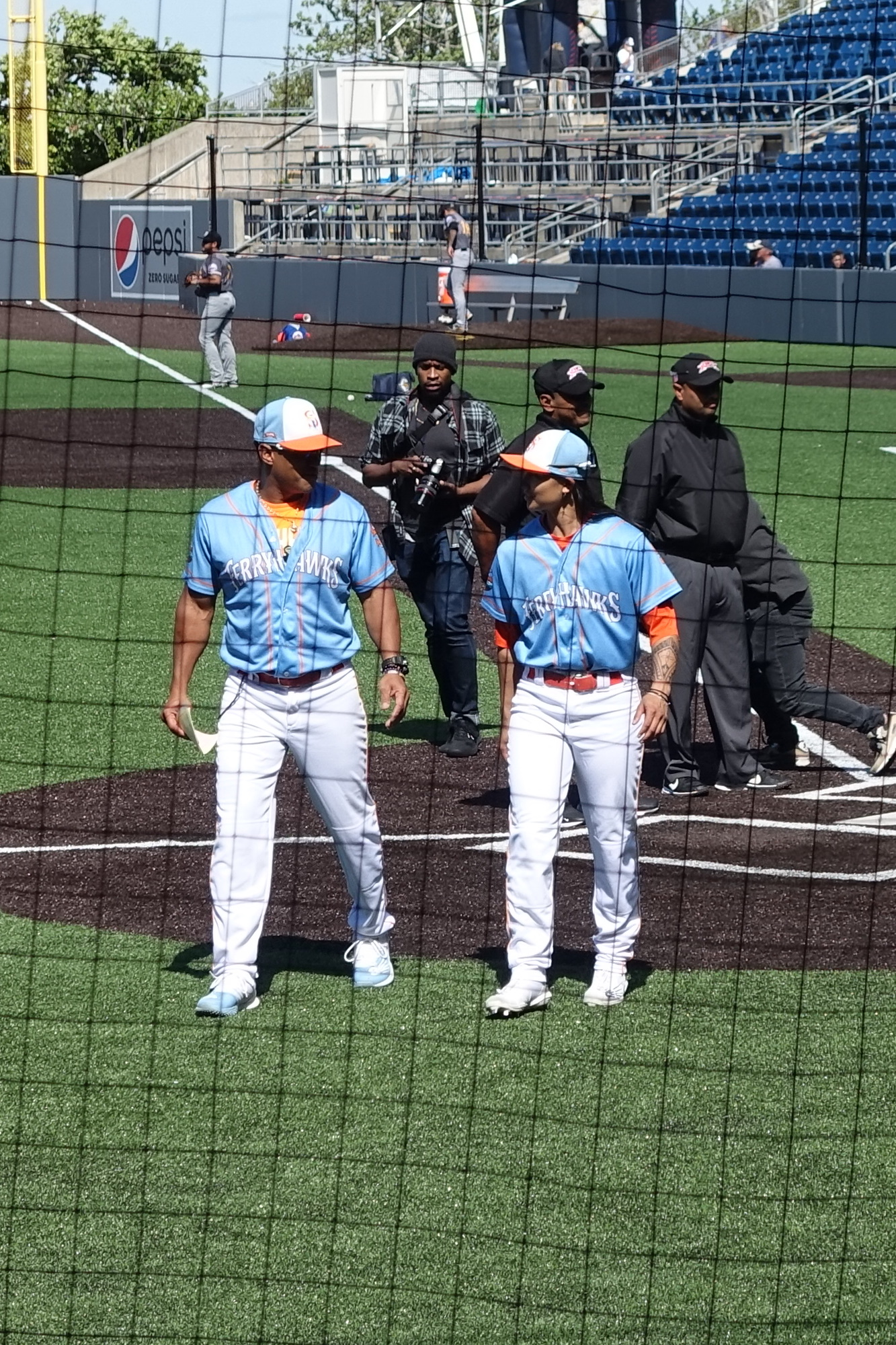
- Whitmore (right) with the Staten Island FerryHawks in 2022

San Francisco Firebells – No. 3
- Pitcher / Outfielder
- Born: July 5, 1998 (age 28); San Diego, California, U.S.
- Bats: Both Throws: Right
- Stats at Baseball Reference
Medals
Women's baseball
Representing United States
Women's Baseball World Cup
Silver medal – second place	2014 Japan	Team competition
Silver medal – second place	2024 Canada	Team competition
Pan American Games
Gold medal – first place	2015 Toronto	Team competition

Kelsie Ann-Gamboa Whitmore (born July 5, 1998) is an American professional baseball pitcher and captain of the San Francisco Firebells of the Women's Professional Baseball League. She also plays for the Savannah Bananas and has represented the United States women's national baseball team in international competition since 2014. Whitmore played college softball for the Cal State Fullerton Titans and has also played baseball professionally for the Sonoma Stompers of the Pacific Association, Staten Island FerryHawks of Atlantic League, and Oakland Ballers of the Pioneer League. She was the first woman to appear in the starting lineup in an Atlantic League game and was selected first overall in the inaugural Women's Pro Baseball League draft in 2025.

== Early life ==
Whitmore is a native Californian. Her father, Scott, is a middle school physical education teacher and her mother, Mirasol, is a native of the Philippines and a kindergarten teacher.

== Amateur career ==
Growing up, Whitmore played Little League Baseball and PONY Baseball. She attended Temecula Valley High School in Temecula, California. She played for the school's baseball team, the only girl on the team. She also played soccer and golf at Temecula Valley. In 2017, Whitmore enrolled at California State University, Fullerton, where she received a scholarship to play college softball for the Cal State Fullerton Titans. She also trained with the Titans' baseball team. Whitmore received a fifth year of eligibility from the National Collegiate Athletic Association due to the cancellation of the 2020 season because of the COVID-19 pandemic. In 2021, she batted .395 with a .507 on-base percentage and a .824 slugging percentage. She was named the Big West Conference's softball player of the year.

While in high school, Whitmore joined the United States women's national baseball team. She won the silver medal at the 2014 Women's Baseball World Cup and the gold medal in the 2015 Pan American Games. Whitmore also participated in the 2018 Women's Baseball World Cup, as the United States finished in fourth place. Playing for the national team from 2014 through 2019, she had a 1.35 earned run average (ERA) as a pitcher.

In October 2021, Whitmore joined the Portland Pickles of the West Coast League, a collegiate summer baseball league, when they played a two-game series against the Venados de Mazatlán of the Mexican Pacific League. In the second game, Whitmore pitched five scoreless innings.

== Professional career ==
=== Sonoma Stompers ===
In 2016, the Sonoma Stompers of the Pacific Association, an independent baseball league, signed Whitmore and Stacy Piagno; they became the first female teammates in professional baseball since the 1950s when women played in the Negro Leagues. Whitmore recorded her first professional hit on July 20. She also played for Sonoma in the 2017 season. Whitmore had two hits in 26 at bats. She also pitched three innings for Sonoma. Whitmore pitched to Anna Kimbrell during a game in 2016, forming the first all-female battery in a professional baseball league game since the All-American Girls Professional Baseball League.

=== Staten Island FerryHawks ===
On April 8, 2022, Whitmore signed with the Staten Island FerryHawks of the Atlantic League of Professional Baseball. She debuted in the Atlantic League as a pinch runner on April 22 and became the first woman to start an Atlantic League game on May 1, playing as a left fielder. On May 4, Whitmore became the first woman to pitch in an Atlantic League game. Entering the game with the bases loaded and two outs, she retired Ryan Jackson, a former major leaguer, on a fly out to end the inning. For the 2022 season, Whitmore batted .026, hitting a single in 39 at-bats, while on the mound allowed 14 earned runs in 10 1/3 innings for a 12.19 ERA. She became a free agent after the season.

On April 18, 2023, Whitmore re-signed with Staten Island. As a pitcher, she made 13 relief outings for the club, struggling to a 9.49 ERA with 4 strikeouts across 12 1/3 innings pitched. As a batter, she appeared in 25 games, going 0-for-14 with one walk.

=== Oakland Ballers ===
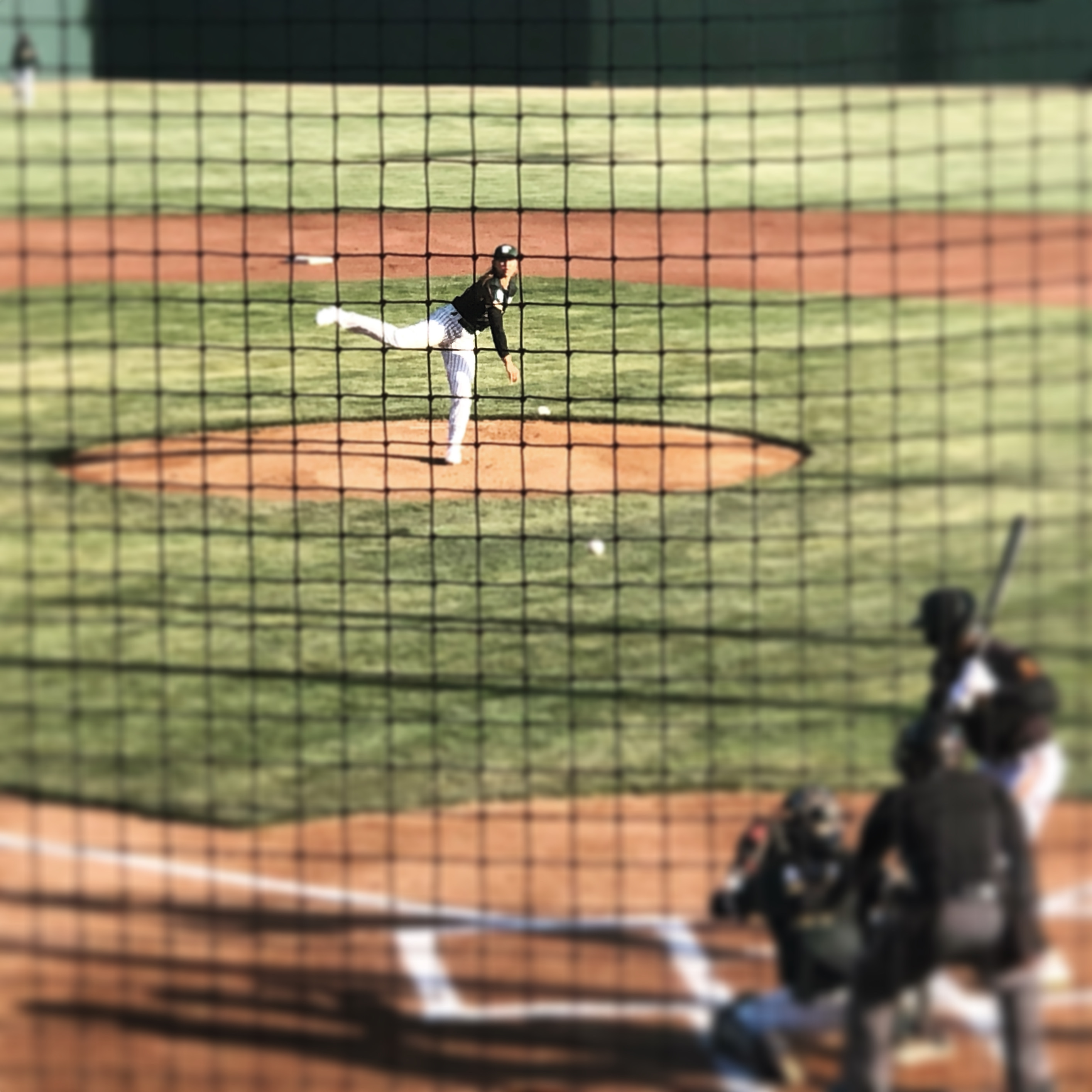
Kelsie Whitmore debuting with the Oakland Ballers.

On April 10, 2024, Whitmore signed with the Oakland Ballers of the Pioneer League, following an open tryout with the team in which she was one of only three players who signed out of 110 participants. She became the first woman to play for that league later that year. On June 6, she became the first female player to start a Pioneer League game. In that game, she struck out one batter. She played in 13 games for the Ballers, pitching 23 innings and giving up a 12.17 ERA. In April 2025, Whitmore had a tryout with El Águila de Veracruz of the Mexican League.

=== Savannah Bananas ===
On August 1, 2025, Whitmore signed with the Savannah Bananas, a barnstorming baseball team. She made her debut that weekend in Baltimore at Camden Yards against the Firefighters. In the 2025 Banana Ball season Whitmore played at eight MLB stadiums, including a hometown appearance at Petco Park. On January 12, 2026, the Bananas announced that they had re-signed Whitmore, with an accommodation for time off for WPBL and international competition.

=== San Francisco Firebells ===
On November 20, 2025, Whitmore became the first overall draft pick in the inaugural Women's Pro Baseball League draft. She was selected by WPBL San Francisco (later named San Francisco Firebells). On July 31, 2026, it was announced that she would serve as the team's captain.

== See also ==
- Women in baseball
