= Robin Roberts Stadium =

Baseball stadium in Springfield, Illinois

Robin Roberts Stadium at Lanphier Park
- Interactive map of Robin Roberts Stadium at Lanphier Park
- Former names: Lanphier Park (1928–1976)
- Location: Springfield, Illinois
- Coordinates: 39.817074°N 89.6364°W
- Owner: Friends of Robin Roberts Stadium
- Operator: Friends of Robin Roberts Stadium
- Capacity: 5,200
- Surface: Natural grass
- Field size: Foul Lines: 320 ft. Center Field: 415 ft.
- Public transit: SMTD

Construction
- Opened: 1925

Tenants
- Springfield Senators (Three–I League) 1928–1935; Springfield Browns (Three–I League) 1938–1942, 1946–1949; Springfield Redbirds (AA) 1978–1981; Springfield Cardinals (MWL) 1982–1993; Springfield Sultans (MWL) 1994–1995; Springfield Capitals (FL) 1996–2001; Springfield Sliders/Springfield Lucky Horseshoes (CICL/PL) 2008–present Robert Morris–Springfield Eagles (USCAA); Women's Professional Baseball League 2026

Robin Roberts Stadium at Lanphier Park is a stadium in Springfield, Illinois. It is primarily used for baseball. It originally opened in 1928 as Reservoir Stadium (name references to water reservoir located on what is now Lanphier High School) and was renovated in 1977. It holds 5,200 people. The stadium was renamed after Robin Roberts (1926–2010), a Hall-of-Fame pitcher and a graduate of Lanphier High School who was Springfield's most accomplished ballplayer, in 1976. From 1972 to 1979, the NCAA Division II baseball tournament was held at Lanphier.

The field has been home to a number of minor league teams. The AAA American Association Springfield Redbirds played there from 1978 to 1981. Two affiliates in the Class-A Midwest League also called Lanphier home; the Springfield Cardinals and the Springfield Sultans, as well as an independent Frontier League team, the Springfield Capitals. Earlier teams who played intermittently at the stadium in its youth included the Class-B Springfield Senators and Springfield Browns, both of the Three-I League.

In December 2007 it was announced that baseball would return to Springfield, Illinois. The Springfield Sliders debuted in the CICL (Central Illinois Collegiate League) and won the league championship in their first season. It would be the final CICL championship, as the league was disbanded and its teams (including the Sliders) became a part of the Prospect League.

The stadium also sees considerable use hosting local school baseball teams including the Lanphier High School Lions, the latter of which neighbors the municipal athletic complex the stadium is situated upon. The stadium is the former home of the Benedictine University at Springfield Bulldogs baseball team.

In 2026 the stadium served as the neutral venue for all games played during the inaugural season of the Women's Pro Baseball League.

Preceded by Branch Rickey Stadium	Home of the Springfield Capitals; 1996 – 2001	Succeeded by Marinelli Field
