= Women's Pro Baseball League =

Women's baseball league in the United States

- Current season, competition or edition: 2026 Women's Pro Baseball League season
- Classification: Independent
- Sport: Women's baseball
- First season: 2026
- Owners: Justine Siegal; Keith Stein
- No. of teams: 4
- Country: United States
- Most recent champion: Los Angeles Queens (1st title)
- Most titles: Los Angeles Queens (1)
- Website: Official website

The Women’s Pro Baseball League (WPBL) is an American professional women's baseball league. Co-founded by Justine Siegal and Keith Stein, the league began its first season on August 1, 2026 with four teams representing four cities across the United States: the Boston Hunters, New York Heights, Los Angeles Queens, and San Francisco Firebells. Robin Roberts Stadium in Springfield, Illinois, serves as a neutral venue for all games played during the inaugural season.

The league was founded in 2024 with an aim to elevate the visibility and proliferation of women's baseball by establishing a path to professionalism for college and amateur players. It is the fifth American professional women's baseball league, after the All-American Girls Professional Baseball League (1943–1954), National Girls Baseball League (1944–1954), International Girls Baseball League (1952–1953), and Ladies League Baseball (1997–1998). It has no association with Major League Baseball. Maybelle Blair, Cito Gaston, Digit Murphy, and Ayami Sato assisted in the league's initial development. The league's competitions, played during the summer, consist of a regular season and a postseason. Games last seven innings. Teams consist of 15–17 players and batters may use aluminum, composite, and wood bats. The league broadcast its games on ESPN Select in the U.S. and YouTube internationally.

== History ==
The WPBL was co-founded in 2024 by former Major League Baseball (MLB) coach Justine Siegal and Keith Stein, owner of the Canadian Baseball League's Toronto Maple Leafs. An advocate for gender equality in sports, Siegal previously founded Baseball for All, a nonprofit organization that promotes girls' participation in baseball. The commercial success and stability of the Women's National Basketball Association (WNBA) and National Women's Soccer League (NWSL) inspired Siegal and Stein to create a professional league for women's baseball, and hired Japan national team pitcher Ayami Sato and former Toronto Blue Jays manager Cito Gaston as special advisers to help develop it. The league's primary aim is to increase the visibility and proliferation of women's baseball by establishing a pathway to professionalism, as no high school or college in the U.S. offers girls' or women's baseball programs, and while over 1,300 girls played on high school baseball teams in the 2023–24 academic year, only nine women played on NCAA college baseball teams in 2024. The league also intends to capitalize on market research conducted by the MLB, which found that 46% of MLB fans were women, and 53% of women considered themselves MLB fans. The league's startup costs were reportedly between $5–30 million.

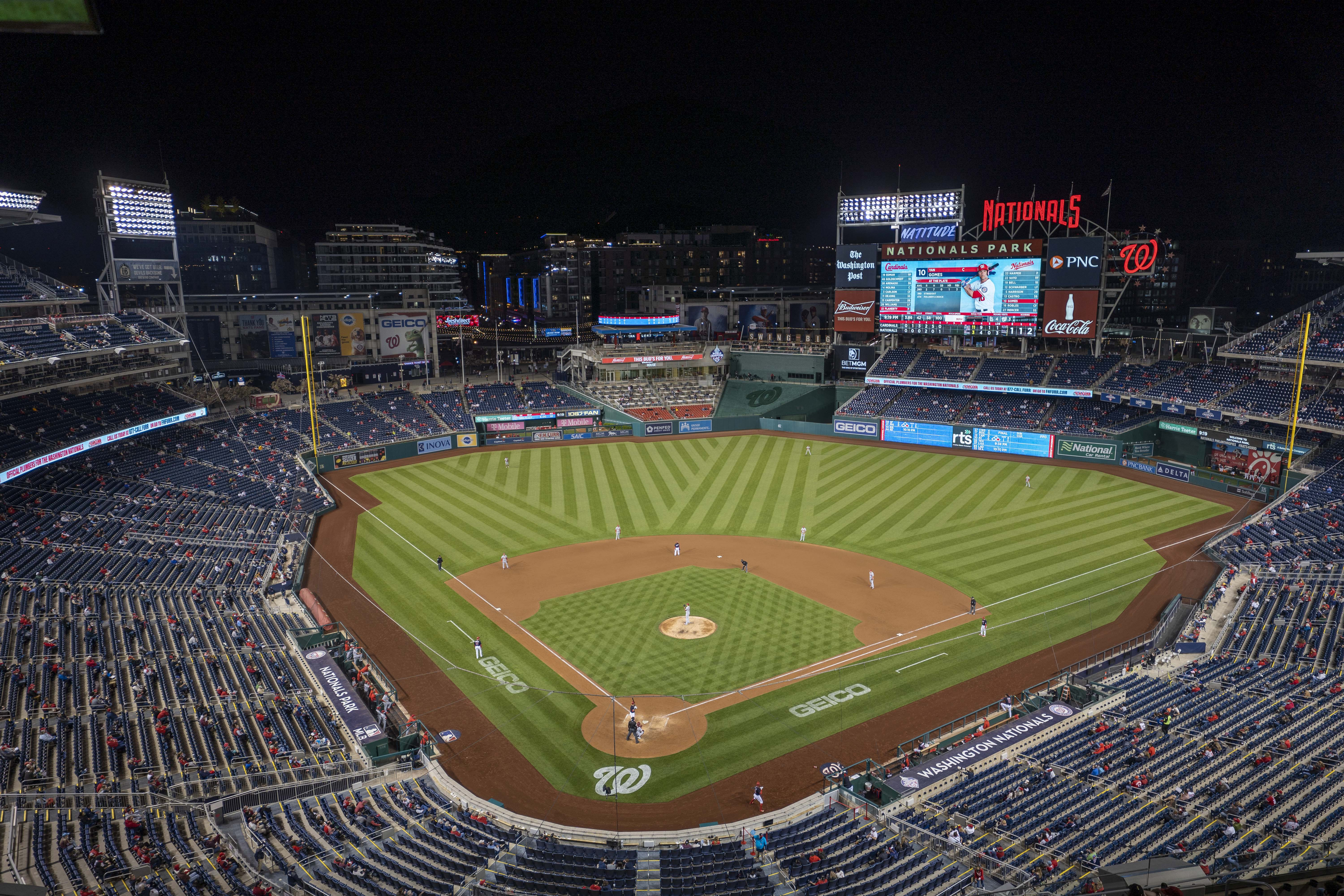
The WPBL's first tryouts were held at Nationals Park (pictured) in Washington, D.C., in August 2025.

The WPBL announced its establishment via a press release in October 2024. Player registrations opened shortly afterwards, and within 24 hours, over 400 players from the U.S., Canada, Japan, and the United Kingdom registered their interest in playing in the league. After a week, registrations grew to over 700 players. The league's launch also cultivated significant public interest: a Hart Research poll conducted in April 2025 found interest in the WPBL (19%) to be on par with the WNBA (21%) and NCAA women's college basketball (21%).

In August 2025, the league held tryouts at the Nationals Youth Baseball Academy and Nationals Park in Washington, D.C., to determine 130 eligible draftees. Over 600 players registered to try out, including Mo'ne Davis, whose return to baseball after five years attracted media attention. The inaugural four teams of the WPBL were announced in late October, and the first draft was conducted virtually in November 2025. Kelsie Whitmore was the first draft pick; she was selected by the San Francisco Firebells. Davis was the tenth pick, selected by the Los Angeles Queens. The draft was conducted centrally by the league's baseball operations department, with the future managers of the teams not involved in selecting players.

In March 2026, the league held a two-day spring training camp in Fort Myers, Florida at JetBlue Park, the Boston Red Sox's spring training stadium. Players from each of the league's four teams played a seven-inning exhibition game. The league also held preseason events in Brockton, Massachusetts, and Stockton, California. The team names were announced as the Boston Hunters, Los Angeles Queens, New York Heights, and San Francisco Firebells on July 8. The league began play on August 1.

== Organization and ownership ==
The WPBL is owned by co-founders Justine Siegal and Keith Stein. Jeffrey Gardner is the league's director of baseball operations.Assia Grazioli-Venier served as the league's chair when it launched and is an investor. The league has no association with Major League Baseball, though MLB commissioner Rob Manfred provided a video message for the league's draft. A seven-member advisory board deliberates with Siegal and Stein on league decisions. It initially consisted of Laura Gentile, Kate Childs Graham, Leslie Heaphy, Nona Lee, Digit Murphy, Ayami Sato, and Kat Williams. In 2026, a lawsuit filed by a board member Mina Kim stated the league's board of directors consisted of Stein, Mark Prosterman, Andreas Kloppenborg, Tamara Holmes, and Kara Roll.

Former Peoria Redwings pitcher Maybelle Blair also serves as its honorary chair. U.S. national team captain Alex Hugo leads the league's player development and recruiting efforts. Dave Stewart is also an advisor.

The four teams in the league are centrally owned by the WPBL and have no separate front office staff, such as a general manager. Siegel said in August 2026 that as the league grows, it intends to allow ownership of individual franchises. She also said all players are signed to one-season contracts and that the league is planning to hold another season in the future.

In July, board member Mina Kim sued the league to get access to some financial records. Her lawsuit also alleged potential financial discrepancies tied to Stein.

== Season and game format ==
Competition in the WPBL consists of a regular season, starting in August, followed by postseason playoffs that will determine the league's champion. Each team will play two to three games a week, scheduled between Wednesdays and Sundays. WPBL games are seven innings, and players have their choice of batting with wood, composite or aluminum bats.

== Teams ==
The WPBL commenced play in 2026 with four teams based in Boston, Los Angeles, New York, and San Francisco. The league has planned an expansion to six or eight clubs. The league's 2026 season is held at Robin Roberts Stadium in Springfield, Illinois. Teams have a $95,000 salary cap.

Players earn $300–$500 per game and are provided with accommodation, meals on game days, and a share of revenue from sponsors atop their regular salary, which is expected to be "comparable" to those in minor leagues. Teams have a 15-player active roster with two inactive players. Approximately half of the players drafted were not offered contracts with the teams, and some players said they received little communication from the league following the draft.

Team	City	Manager	Founded	Inaugural season
Boston Hunters	Boston, Massachusetts	Jemile Weeks	2025	2026
Los Angeles Queens	Los Angeles, California	Eric Young Sr.	2025	2026
New York Heights	New York City	Rachelle Henley	2025	2026
San Francisco Firebells	San Francisco, California	Matt Williams	2025	2026

== Broadcasting ==
For the 2026 season, ESPN is streaming all games on ESPN Select in the United States. Eleven regular season games will also be simulcast on Scripps Sports Network. Games are available on YouTube outside the United States. The agreement with ESPN was announced two days before the start of the 2026 season, which made it difficult for bars and restaurants to legally broadcast games. Fremantle produces the league's broadcasts, shoulder programming, and documentaries on the league and its clubs.

== See also ==
- List of organized baseball leagues
  - Athletes Unlimited Softball League
  - North American Women's Baseball League
  - Women's Professional Fastpitch
- Women in baseball
- Women's sports in the United States
