= Mo'ne Davis =

American baseball player (born 2001)

Mo’ne Davis
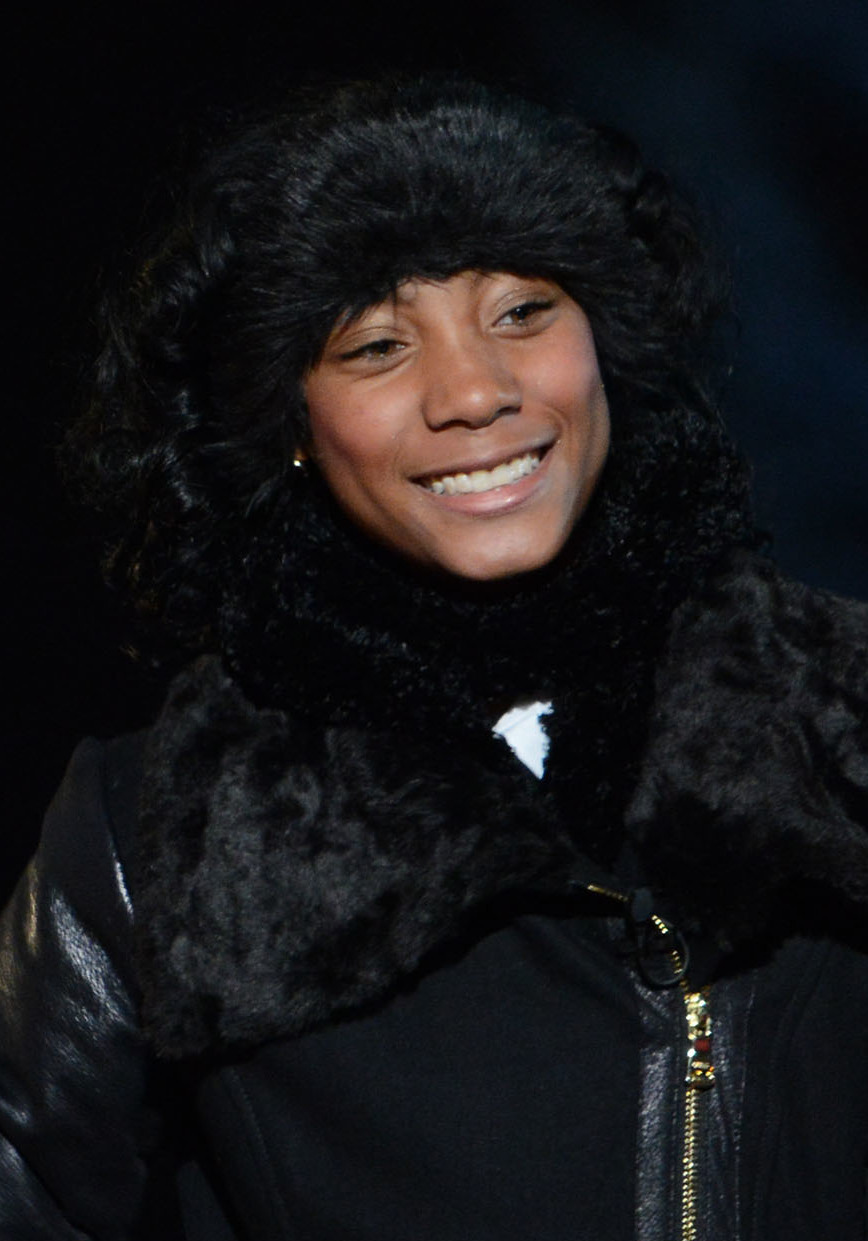
- Davis at the 2014 National Christmas Tree lighting ceremony

Los Angeles Queens – No. 3
- Outfielder
- Born: June 24, 2001 (age 25)
- Bats: Right Throws: Right

WPBL debut
- Aug 1, 2026, for the Los Angeles Queens
- Stats at Baseball Reference

Teams
- As player: Los Angeles Queens (2026–present)

Career highlights and awards
- WPBL Champion (2026)

Mo'ne Ikea Davis (born June 24, 2001) is an American professional baseball player for the Los Angeles Queens of the Women's Professional Baseball League, on which she is a center fielder.

Originally from Philadelphia, Pennsylvania, Davis is a former Little League Baseball pitcher and former Hampton University softball player. She was one of two girls who played in the 2014 Little League World Series and was the first girl to earn a win and to throw a shutout in Little League World Series history. She was the 18th girl overall to play and the sixth to get a hit. She was also the first Little League baseball player to appear on the cover of Sports Illustrated as a Little League player.

== Biography ==
Davis is the daughter of Lamar Davis and Lakeisha McLean. She has lived with her mother and stepfather, Mark Williams, since the age of six.

In 2008, Steve Bandura, who is program director for Marian Anderson Recreation Center in South Philadelphia, observed Davis playing football with her cousins and older brother. He noticed that "she was throwing this football in perfect spirals, effortless and running these tough kids down and tackling them." Bandura asked her if she would like to come to a basketball practice. When she came to practice, Bandura asked her to watch the practice, but she wanted to participate. Bandura told The Philadelphia Tribune that "Her eyes were just glued on the drill and, when it came time for her turn, she went through it like she has been doing it a thousand times. I just knew right then." According to The Philadelphia Tribune, Davis became Bandura's best basketball player and the only girl on the team. She also began playing and excelling at baseball and soccer.

Bandura, together with other sponsors, helped Davis transfer to Springside Chestnut Hill Academy. Her mother, Lakeisha McLean, told The Philadelphia Tribune that she was unaware that her daughter was so athletic. In 2011, she was a point guard in basketball, a pitcher, shortstop, and third baseman in baseball, but she revealed that she started pitching when she was a substitute from outfielder, and mid-fielder for soccer.

As of August 2014, while notable as a Little League pitcher, she considered basketball her primary sport. She aspired to become a WNBA player, and had expressed desire to play college basketball for the UConn Huskies of the University of Connecticut, despite not being formally recruited, and follow in the footsteps of Maya Moore, a UConn alumna who went on to play in WNBA.

In 2015, she released a memoir, written with Hilary Beard, Mo'ne Davis: Remember My Name. That year she also teamed up with the brand M4D3 (Make A Difference Everyday) to design a line of sneakers for girls, with some of the proceeds going toward the Plan International's Because I Am a Girl initiative, which has the goal of helping to lift four million girls in the developing world out of poverty.

In 2018, she committed to Virginia's Hampton University to play softball starting in the fall of 2019. Davis made her debut for the Lady Pirates on February 8, 2020, going 1-for-3, driving in two runs, and recording a sacrifice in Hampton's 15–4 win over North Carolina A&T. She ended the season third on the team in chances (77) and putouts (46) and had a .333 batting average with three multi-hit games and two multi-RBI games. Davis started as an infielder in 49 of the Pirates' 55 games and her batting average dipped to .219 with six doubles, 24 runs scored (2nd on the team), 16 RBI, and a perfect 8-for-8 in steals on the basepaths.

Despite having played in two seasons for the Hampton University softball team, Davis was not on the Pirates' 2023 roster.

In 2023, Davis began her graduate studies at Columbia University.

== Pitching ==
At age 13, Davis threw a 70 miles per hour (110 km/h) fastball, while the average velocity in her age class was 63 miles per hour (101 km/h) to 73 miles per hour (117 km/h) range. According to Will Femia, a 71 miles per hour (114 km/h) pitch (which was clocked during her August 15, 2014 game) is equivalent in reaction time at the plate for a batter to a 93 miles per hour (150 km/h) pitch on a full sized diamond. She also threw a curve ball that gave "opposing hitters fits".

Davis relied more on the precise mechanics of pitching rather than strength. According to John Brenkus of ESPN, Davis had a wind up and release point that never varied by more than 3 degrees. Although her arm was 15% shorter than a major league pitcher's arm, she was able to deliver balls at over 70 miles per hour (110 km/h). Her pitching was compared to the throwing motion of major league pitcher Jonathan Papelbon. At the end of her throwing motion, her arm was moving forward at peak angular velocity of 2500˚/sec, which was over 80% of the peak angular velocity (3000˚/sec) of typical major league pitchers.

== Little League World Series ==
=== Background ===
In 1972, Maria Pepe was the first girl to start in Little League games, but she was removed when opposing teams demanded her removal. The National Organization for Women filed suit for Pepe, and in 1973 Judge Sylvia Pressler ruled that "The institution of Little League is as American as the hot dog and apple pie. There is no reason why that part of Americana should be withheld from girls." Although the ruling came too late for Pepe to play, since she had turned 14, the ruling made it possible for Davis and other girls to play Little League baseball.

Davis was the fourth American girl and 18th overall to play in the Little League World Series, out of almost 9,000 participants since the tournament began in 1947. The 2014 Little League World Series was also the third time in which two girls participated. Davis was also the sixth girl to get a hit in Little League World Series history.

On August 10, 2014, Davis pitched a three-hit 8–0 shutout over Newark National Little League of Delaware to get into the Mid-Atlantic Region of the Little League World Series.

=== First win for a girl ===
On August 15, 2014, Davis became the first girl in Little League World Series history to pitch a winning game (for the Taney Dragons), which also made her the first girl to pitch a shutout in Little League postseason history. She led her team to a 4–0 victory over Nashville. She pitched six innings, struck out eight batters, and gave up two infield hits. In the sixth inning, she struck out the first two batters, and she brought a third batter to a full count when she struck him out. After the game, Pennsylvania governor Tom Corbett predicted that someday she would play in professional baseball.

=== Television ratings ===
ESPN's broadcast of the semifinals game in which Davis played on August 20, 2014, brought a 3.4 overnight rating, which marked an all-time high for Little League on ESPN. In the game, Davis was tagged with the loss after she failed to make it out of the 3rd inning, giving up 3 earned runs in 2.1 innings. She later made an error at first as Nevada won the game 8-1, eliminating Pennsylvania from series contention.

== Media and celebrity ==
After becoming the first female to pitch a shutout in postseason Little League history, she received congratulatory Twitter messages from Mike Trout, Marcus Stroman, Kevin Durant, and requests for interviews by television hosts such as Jimmy Fallon. Rachel Maddow said that Davis was the "best new thing in the world". She also was praised by Ellen DeGeneres, Billie Jean King, and Michelle Obama. Davis told ESPN "I never thought at the age of 13 I'd be a role model. I always wanted to be a role model, but being a baseball role model is really cool."

She appeared on the August 25, 2014 Sports Illustrated front cover, which made her the first Little League baseball player to appear on the front cover of a top US sports magazine as a Little League player. Asked about appearing on cover of Sports Illustrated, Davis said "I don't know. Kind of surprised, but I mean, it was fun."

In 2014, Paul Graziano, who had been the Little League World Series press box announcer for the last 34 years, stated he had never seen the level of excitement that early in the tournament and that this was partly due to the presence of Davis. The crowds cheered every time Davis pitched or was at bat, and she received standing ovations as she was pitching her shut-out win on August 15, 2014.

On August 19, 2014, Mark Hyman, assistant professor of sports management at George Washington University, told The New York Times "She's the most talked-about baseball player on earth right now". According to The New York Times, Davis increased the ratings of ABC and ESPN and, as of August 19, Davis had appeared on the front page of The Philadelphia Inquirer for five straight days.

Josh Peter, writing for USA Today, raised concern about the merchandising and marketing surrounding Davis' celebrity. For example, on August 20, 2014, a baseball appeared on eBay, and the auction price was up to $510, along with approximately 40 other items supposedly autographed by Davis. However, it was not just the autograph seekers who created problems for Davis. According to Peter, two companies were selling unauthorized Mo'ne jerseys.

In September 2014, Davis donated her jersey to the Baseball Hall of Fame. She was accompanied by teammates from the Anderson Monarchs. Mamie Johnson, one of the three women to play in Negro league baseball was present at the event.

In October 2014, Davis was named one of "The 25 Most Influential Teens of 2014" by Time magazine. Also in October, a 16-minute documentary about Davis, entitled I Throw Like a Girl, directed by Spike Lee, and produced by Spike DDB for Chevrolet, was released. On October 25 Davis threw out the ceremonial first pitch of game 4 of the MLB World Series at AT&T Park in San Francisco. In addition, Davis was named Sports Illustrated Kids' "SportsKid of the Year" for 2014. and was named one of ESPNW's Impact 25 in 2014.

In March 2015, Bloomsburg University baseball player Joey Casselberry made a crude remark about her on Twitter and was suspended from future play. After he had made a public apology, Davis initiated a plea to the school, requesting that the player be reinstated. Bloomsburg University responded with the statement: "Her request demonstrates the type of person she is, her level of maturity and the empathy that her family and coach teach her. Bloomsburg University stands firm on our decision; however, his consequences will be reviewed as is common in disciplinary actions like this."

Davis was shown in Marie Claire magazine's "The 8 Greatest Moments for Women in Sports".

In July 2015, Davis won the Best Breakthrough Athlete ESPY Award.

On March 12, 2025, a statue of Davis was unveiled at the Louisville Slugger Museum & Factory, which made Davis the first non-Major League Baseball player to have a statue there.

== Analysis of her broader impact ==
In 2014, writing for CNN, Kelly Wallace suggested that Davis' accomplishments will affect both girls and boys, women and men. In Wallace's view, she will inspire girls who want to play baseball in the future. To support this view, Wallace cited the case of Stephanie Tuck, who, as a girl, played on a Little League team. Tuck, recounting the experience of Little League play, said "I was heckled by the dads: 'Get that girl off the field.' I used to literally pray the ball would not come to me in right field, as the pressure was so intense." Wallace also wrote that Davis' play will remove the "specialness" of girls playing at the level of boys. In the future, fans will look at how good a player is, and gender will not be important. For men and boys, Wallace argued that Davis' performance will reduce gender biases about the roles of boys and girls. For example, "Throwing like a girl", according to Wallace, now has a completely different and positive meaning. Melissa Isaacson, writing for ABC News, expressed similar views. Wallace also speculated that the more attention female athletes such as Davis receive from girls, boys, men, and women, the more popular women's sports will become. Finally, Wallace suggested that the tremendous interest that Davis has piqued in the Little League World Series might lead to increased participation of both boys and girls in baseball, which has suffered from major league "performance-enhancing drug scandals".

== Broadcasting ==
In 2019 and again in 2021, Davis briefly worked as a broadcaster for ESPN during 2019 and 2021 for a few Little League World Series games. Davis has also appeared on various baseball and softball broadcasts for the MLB Network, including the MLB Network Showcase: Clubhouse Edition with CC Sabathia. Davis was one of the announcers for the DC Grays in the summer of 2022.

== Women's Pro Baseball League ==
On November 20, 2025, Davis was drafted by WPBL Los Angeles (later named Los Angeles Queens) of the Women's Pro Baseball League in its first ever draft. She was the 10th overall draft pick. On December 22, 2025, she officially signed a contract to play with the team.

== Banana Ball ==
On April 9, 2026, Davis signed her first professional league contract with the Indianapolis Clowns, a member of the Banana Ball Championship League.

Like Toni Stone, who in 1953 became the first woman to play regularly for a professional men's team when she replaced Hank Aaron on the Negro league Indianapolis Clowns, Davis advocates for girls in baseball and for equity in women's sports.

== See also ==
- Lizzie Arlington
- Ila Borders
- Tiffany Brooks
- Julie Croteau
- Margaret Gisolo
- Edith Houghton
- Mamie Johnson
- Carolyn King
- Kathryn Johnston Massar
- Jackie Mitchell
- Maud Nelson
- Carey Schueler
- Toni Stone
- Alta Weiss
- Eri Yoshida
- Women in baseball
