= Women in baseball =

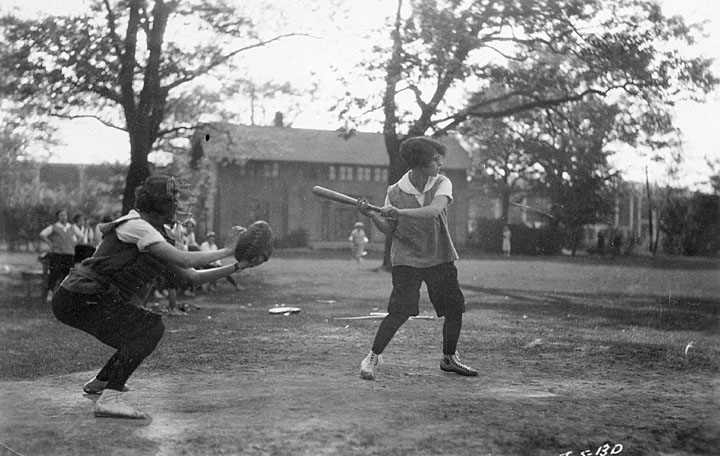
Women playing baseball at the University of Wisconsin–Madison in 1928

Women have a long history in American baseball and many women's teams have existed over the years. Baseball was played at women's colleges in New York and New England as early as the mid-nineteenth century; teams were formed at Vassar College, Smith College, Wellesley College, and Mount Holyoke College. An African American women's team, the Philadelphia Dolly Vardens, was formed in 1867.

A number of women's barnstorming teams have existed, and women have played alongside major league players in exhibition games. On April 2, 1931, 17-year-old Jackie Mitchell (originally known as "Virne Beatrice Mitchell Gilbert") of the Chattanooga Lookouts struck out both Babe Ruth and Lou Gehrig in an exhibition game. As a result, according to some accounts, Commissioner of Baseball Kenesaw Mountain Landis banned her from exhibitions. The first girl to play on a boys varsity high school baseball team was Nellie Twardzik, on April 24, 1935. Twardzik started at first base for the Bartlett High School Indians in Webster, Massachusetts from 1935 through 1937. Her high school letter and glove are on display in the "Diamond Dreams" exhibit featuring women in baseball at the National Baseball Hall of Fame in Cooperstown, New York.

In 1946, former player Edith Houghton became the first woman to work as an independent scout in Major League Baseball when she was hired by the Philadelphia Phillies of the National League. In 1989, NBC's Gayle Gardner became the first woman to regularly host Major League Baseball games for a major television network. In 2015, Jessica Mendoza was the first female analyst for a Major League Baseball game in the history of ESPN. Margaret Donahue (1892–1978) was the first non-owner female front office executive in Major League Baseball, starting as a stenographer for the Chicago Cubs in 1919 before becoming the team's corporate secretary in 1926 and team vice president and executive secretary before she retired in 1958.

Effa Manley, the only woman member of the National Baseball Hall of Fame (inducted 2006), co-owned the Newark Eagles baseball franchise in the Negro leagues from 1935 to 1948.

== Early history ==
Women were playing base ball (as it was then called) as far back as the 1860s, but it was not normal for young women to play what was considered a man's sport. In fact, until the early 1890s, when the bicycle craze hit America, women who wanted to get some outdoor exercise were usually discouraged from doing so. Nevertheless, baseball was played at women's colleges in New York and New England as early as the mid-nineteenth century; teams were formed at Vassar College, Smith College, Wellesley College, and Mount Holyoke College. An African American women's team, the Philadelphia Dolly Vardens, was formed in 1867.

Women competing against each other in base ball dates back to at least 1875 when the first female professional baseball players were recruited to play on teams according to their hair color. The "National Amusement Association", created by Illinois businessman Frank Myers, advertised the novelty of women playing baseball and promoted the sport as family entertainment, suitable for women and children. To garner interest, he divided the teams into "blondes" and "brunettes". Myers's attempt to profit from the novelty event failed in less than a year, but the concept of women playing baseball, divided into teams of blondes and brunettes, continued well into the 20th century as a popular event to stage at picnics and fairs.

In the late 1890s, there were some organized efforts to have all-female baseball teams, several of which enjoyed success. One of the most successful was the Boston Bloomer Girls baseball club; they took their name from the comfortable pants that some sports-minded young women had begun to wear instead of a long skirt. Young women who went against traditional fashion norms and chose bloomers were often called "bloomer girls". While in some cities, local authorities banned women's baseball teams, including the Bloomer Girls, in other cities, the club was welcomed by curious fans who had never seen female ballplayers.

The Bloomer Girls toured the United States in 1897; the press referred to them as the "champion women's club of the world", although this may have been marketing hyperbole, given that the team often seemed inexperienced and did not play very well. One regular standout for the Bloomers was pitcher Maud Nelson, whose talents as a player were praised by reporters; but her teammates did not seem to have as much polish or skill as she did. As they gained more experience, they began to play with more confidence; while still regarded as a novelty, the club often drew large crowds of appreciative fans, many of whom came to see Maud Nelson and her curve ball. The Boston Bloomers were still touring and playing baseball in the early 1900s; by 1907–1908, their team also included several male players, but the majority of the team continued to be female.

On July 5, 1898, Lizzie Arlington became the first woman to play for a professional men's baseball team when she pitched the ninth inning for the Reading Coal Heavers against the Allentown Peanuts. Reading was leading 5–0 heading into the final inning when Arlington entered the game. Though she allowed two hits and walked a batter to load the bases, Arlington succeeded in retiring the next three batters to preserve the victory, as the crowd enthusiastically shouted "Good for Lizzie!"

In 1917, Representative Jeannette Rankin of Montana was one of two scorekeepers at the Congressional Baseball Game. However, it was not until 1993 that Representatives Ileana Ros-Lehtinen of Florida, Maria Cantwell of Washington, and Blanche Lincoln of Arkansas became the first women to be in the starting lineup.

Margaret Donahue (1892–1978) was the first non-owner female front office executive in Major League Baseball, starting as a stenographer for the Chicago Cubs in 1919 before becoming the team's corporate secretary in 1926 and team vice president and executive secretary before she retired in 1958.

== 1920–2000 ==
Perhaps the best known young woman playing baseball in the early 1920s was Rhode Island's Lizzie Murphy. She was the first woman to play baseball against major league players, in 1922. A first baseman, she played for the Providence (RI) Independents, and was praised by newspaper reporters for her fielding skills. Sportswriters said she was every bit as talented as a male player, and noted that she was paid $300 a week, more than many minor league players of the 1920s received. Murphy, who had begun playing baseball when she was only ten, had dreams of becoming a major league player, but she was not able to achieve that goal. She did in 1922 become the first female baseball player to play against major league players, in a game that was a charity exhibition pitting all-star players from the New England and American Leagues against the Boston Red Sox. She was also able to have a long career in the semi-pro leagues, leading a touring team that played all over the eastern United States. According to newspaper accounts, she developed a loyal following, with numerous fans who came out to watch her and her team play. Lizzie Murphy's baseball career lasted from 1918 to 1935.

While Murphy was perhaps the best-known woman playing for an all-male team in the 1920s, there was at least one other woman athlete whose abilities included playing baseball. Philadelphia's Betty Schenkel not only played baseball with the boys during high school, but she was said to be adept in other sports, including basketball, soccer, and cycling.

On April 2, 1931, 17-year-old Jackie Mitchell (originally known as "Virne Beatrice Mitchell Gilbert") of the Chattanooga Lookouts struck out both Babe Ruth and Lou Gehrig in an exhibition game. By some accounts, Commissioner of Baseball Kenesaw Mountain Landis banned her from exhibitions as a result.

The first girl to play on a boys varsity high school baseball team was Nellie Twardzik, on April 24, 1935. Twardzik started at first base for the Bartlett2026 High School Indians in Webster, Massachusetts from 1935 through 1937. Her high school letter and glove are on display in the "Diamond Dreams" exhibit featuring women in baseball at the National Baseball Hall of Fame in Cooperstown, New York.

Effa Manley, the only woman member of the National Baseball Hall of Fame (inducted 2006), co-owned the Newark Eagles baseball franchise in the Negro leagues from 1935 to 1948.

=== World War II through 1950 ===
During World War II, over 500 baseball players, including super-stars like Ted Williams, Stan Musial and Joe DiMaggio, enlisted or were drafted. This left major league rosters depleted and severely diminished the level of talent in the league. The owner of the Chicago Cubs, Philip K. Wrigley formed a committee to come up with ideas to keep baseball financially afloat during the war. The result of that committee was the organization of the All-American Girls Professional Baseball League, which operated from 1943 to 1954. At the height of its popularity, it had teams in twelve cities. One of the most successful of the teams in the league was the Rockford (IL) Peaches, which won four championships. The Peaches, and the All-American Girls Professional Baseball League, were commemorated in a 1992 movie, A League of Their Own, starring Geena Davis. In 2022, the television series A League of Their Own, co-created by Will Graham and Abbi Jacobson, was an adaptation of the 1992 movie with new characters and storylines, about the formation of a World War II-era women's professional baseball team. Founded for similar reasons as the AAGPBL, the National Girls Baseball League was in operation from 1944 to 1954.

In 1946, former player Edith Houghton became the first woman to work as an independent scout in Major League Baseball when she was hired by the Philadelphia Phillies of the National League.

=== 1950s–1990s ===
There not being a rule against it, 12-year-old Kathryn Johnston of Corning, New York became the first girl to play Little League Baseball in 1950. Johnston played first base for the King's Dairy team. After that, a rule prohibited girls from playing in Little League; this was in force until 1974. Due to a lawsuit brought on behalf of Maria Pepe by the National Organization for Women, in 1974 the New Jersey Superior Court decided that Little League Baseball must allow girls to play. In the final week of December 1974, President Gerald Ford signed into law a bill that opened Little League Baseball to girls. In 1988, Julie Croteau was recognized as the first woman to play men's NCAA baseball. In 1995, Ila Borders became the first woman to start as pitcher in a men's collegiate baseball game.

In 1952 Major League Baseball began a ban on the signing of women to contracts, a ban that lasted until 1992. The Indianapolis Clowns of the Negro leagues were the first professional baseball team to hire a female player to a long-term contract that was not voided soon after. In an effort to replace Hank Aaron, who had left the team the previous year, the Clowns hired Toni Stone to play second base with the team in 1953, in which she batted .243. In the 1993 MLB draft, the Chicago White Sox drafted left handed pitcher Carey Schueler in the 43rd round. She was the first woman ever drafted by a Major League Baseball team. Prior to Schueler's drafting, the MLB had a ban in place on signing contracts for women; following her drafting by the White Sox, the rule was rescinded. However, she did not sign with the White Sox, and instead attended and played basketball for DePaul University in Chicago, Illinois before transferring to St. Mary's College of California, in Moraga, where she continued to play until an injury in 1996.

Melissa Ludtke was a plaintiff in a federal lawsuit, Melissa Ludtke and Time, Inc., Plaintiffs, v. Bowie Kuhn, Commissioner of Baseball et al. (1978) that is credited with giving equal access to Major League Baseball locker rooms to women sports reporters. In 1977, Ludtke sued the baseball commission on the basis that her 14th amendment rights were violated when she was denied access to the New York Yankees clubhouse while reporting on the 1977 World Series. She won the lawsuit. The United States District Court for the Southern District of New York stated her Fourteenth Amendment right was violated since the New York Yankees clubhouse was controlled by New York City. That court also stated that her fundamental right to pursue a career was violated based on her sex.

Starting in 1989 and continuing to date (July 2021), Janet Marie Smith oversaw multiple MLB stadium projects for the Baltimore Orioles, the Atlanta Braves, the Boston Red Sox, and the Los Angeles Dodgers. Smith directed the design of Baltimore's Oriole Park at Camden Yards which marked a new era of MLB parks. Camden Yards was the first of the "Retro Ballparks," and was unique in that it honored many qualities of ballparks from the classic era ballparks like Fenway Park and Wrigley Field, but also incorporated modern elements and building techniques to improve the overall fan experience as well as the views. Smith's work in major league baseball stadium design and renovation has influenced ballpark design since 1992. "Every ballpark built since Oriole Park's opening owes some debt of its design to that park." Oriole Park became known as "the Baltimore ballpark that changed baseball." Janet Marie Smith's "fingerprints are all over baseball."

Since 1992, the San Francisco Giants have employed older men as “balldudes”, instead of the traditional youths. In 1993, Corinne Mullane became the first "balldudette", and she and her daughter Molly, who began working as a balldudette in the 2000s, have since been included in the National Baseball Hall of Fame as the first mother-daughter ball-retrieving duo in baseball.

In 1994, the Colorado Silver Bullets women's professional baseball team was founded, in which the women players barnstormed around the country playing men's professional and semi-professional teams. They won six of 40 games in their inaugural season, improving to a final winning season of 23–22 in their final year, 1997. Croteau played with the Colorado Silver Bullets in its inaugural season. After one season, she and teammate Lee Anne Ketcham joined the Maui Stingrays of the Hawaii Winter Baseball league for their 1994 season, becoming the first women to play in a Major League Baseball-sanctioned league.

== 2000–present ==
=== Professional leagues ===
In 2008, Eri Yoshida became the first woman drafted by a Japanese men's professional baseball team. In 2010, she became the first female baseball player to play professionally in two countries. On Tuesday, July 27, 2010, Yoshida made her first road start against the Victoria Seals of the independent Golden Baseball League in Victoria, British Columbia, making her the first woman in baseball history to pitch professionally in three different countries. In 2009, Justine Siegal became the first female coach of a men's professional baseball team. In 2011, she was the first woman to throw batting practice (BP) to an MLB team, the Cleveland Indians at spring training. She also threw BP to the Oakland Athletics, Tampa Bay Rays, St. Louis Cardinals, Houston Astros, and New York Mets. In 2015, Siegal became the Oakland Athletics guest instructor for their Instructional League club, thus making her the first female coach in major league baseball history.

For one day in May 2016, Jennie Finch was a guest manager for the Bridgeport Bluefish of the Atlantic League, becoming the first woman to manage a professional baseball team. The team played and won one game that day. In 2016, the Sonoma Stompers of the Pacific Association, an independent baseball league, signed Kelsie Whitmore and Stacy Piagno; they became the first female teammates in professional baseball since the 1950s in the Negro Leagues. Whitmore pitched to Anna Kimbrell during a game in 2016, forming the first all-female battery since the All-American Girls Professional Baseball League.

In January 2021, the Boston Red Sox hired Bianca Smith as a minor league coach. With the hire, Smith was the first black woman to become a coach in professional baseball. In May 2022, Kelsie Whitmore signed with the Staten Island FerryHawks of the Atlantic League, and started a game for them in left field; this made her the first woman to start an Atlantic League of Professional Baseball game. Slightly later in May she became the first woman to pitch in an Atlantic League game when she made her first pitching appearance for Staten Island; entering the game with the bases loaded and two outs, she retired Ryan Jackson, a former major leaguer, on a fly out to end the inning. In 2024, Whitmore became the first woman to play for the Pioneer League. On June 6, 2024, she became the first female player to start a Pioneer League game. In that game she struck out one batter.

On December 3, 2024, the Toronto Maple Leafs announced they had signed the Japanese player Ayami Sato, making her the first female player in the Intercounty Baseball League and first female professional baseball player in Canada. She began playing on May 11, 2025.

In 2025, Sarah Edwards became the first female on-field coach in Asian professional baseball, as a hitting coach for the CTBC Brothers in the Chinese Professional Baseball League.

The Women's Pro Baseball League (WPBL), of the United States, was co-founded in 2024 by former Major League Baseball (MLB) coach Justine Siegal, and owner of the Intercounty Baseball League's Toronto Maple Leafs, Keith Stein. Launching with four teams – the New York Heights, Boston Hunters, Los Angeles Queens and San Francisco Firebells – the league began play on August 1, 2026. Marquee players include Firebells pitcher Kelsie Whitmore, Queens center fielder Mo'ne Davis, and Queens pitcher Ayami Sato who has been called "the greatest women's pitcher ever." The Queens defeated the Heights 10-8 in the inaugural WPBL game.

=== Development leagues ===
On August 15, 2014, Mo'ne Davis was the first girl in Little League World Series history to pitch a winning game (for the Taney Dragons), which also made her the first girl to pitch a shutout in Little League postseason history.

On June 8, 2017, Claire Eccles played her first game as part of the Victoria HarbourCats, making her the first woman to play in the West Coast League.

In 2020, Marika Lyszczyk, a player from Canada, became the first woman to catch in a men's college baseball game, while playing for Rivier University. In 2023, she became the first woman to play in the Futures Collegiate Baseball League, by pitching for the Brockton Rox.

Jaida Lee, at 16 years old, was in August 2022 the first female baseball player to compete in men's baseball at the Canada Summer Games.

In November 2022, Olivia Pichardo became the first woman chosen for any Division I baseball roster when she was chosen for that of Brown University. Pichardo became the first woman to play in a Division I baseball game on March 17, 2023, pinch-hitting for Brown University. In July 2023, she became the first woman to hit a home run while playing in the Hamptons Collegiate Baseball League; she was playing for the Sag Harbor Whalers. In April 2026, Pichardo became the first woman to pitch in a Division I baseball game, pitching for Brown University.

On January 11, 2022, the Yankees announced that Rachel Balkovec would manage the Low-A Tampa Tarpons in 2022, making her the first woman to manage in affiliated baseball.

In January 2023, Veronica Gajownik was hired to manage the Hillsboro Hops, which made her the first woman to manage a Class High-A baseball team and the first openly LGBTQ manager in minor or major league baseball history.

In 2023, Jocelyn Alo became the first woman to play for the Savannah Bananas, getting an at bat in one of their games. In 2024, Alo became the first female member of the Savannah Bananas, signing a one-month contract with the team.

On May 24, 2025, Alexia Jorge became the first woman to play in the Coastal Plain League, which she did as a catcher for the Holly Springs Salamanders.

=== Other playing opportunities ===
The inaugural Women's Baseball World Cup was held in Edmonton, Canada from July 30 to August 8, 2004 after having been chartered by the International Baseball Federation in 2002. Before this tournament the only other international women's baseball tournament was the Women's Baseball World Series, which began in 2001 and usually involved only three or four nations, usually Australia, Canada, Japan and occasionally the U.S.

The first time a women's baseball tournament was held as part of the Pan American Games, the United States team won a gold medal for the 2015 Pan American Games tournament in Toronto, Ontario, Canada.

Women’s baseball was first played at the Canada Summer Games in 2025; Ontario won gold, Alberta won silver, and British Columbia won bronze.

=== Off the field ===
Effa Manley, the only woman member of the Baseball Hall of Fame, was inducted into it in 2006. She co-owned the Newark Eagles baseball franchise in the Negro leagues from 1935 to 1948.

French player Melissa Mayeux was the first female player to be eligible to sign with a major league team, because in 2015 she became the first female player on Major League Baseball's international registration list.

In 2023, Alexandra Irving became the first woman in Major League Baseball history to be an official scorer for a perfect game, which she did for Domingo Germán's perfect game. Previously, on April 8, 2022, Irving and Kara Blackstone, Jillian Geib, and Sarah Johnson had been official scorers for Opening Day, which was the first time Major League Baseball's Opening Day featured four female official scorers.

Also in 2024, the video game MLB: The Show 24 enabled users to create and play as a female baseball player for the first time.

== Broadcasting ==
In 1989, NBC's Gayle Gardner became the first woman to regularly host Major League Baseball games for a major television network. In 1990, Lesley Visser became the first woman to cover the World Series. On August 3, 1993, Gardner became the first woman to do televised play-by-play of a baseball game when she called a game between the Colorado Rockies and Cincinnati Reds. That same year, CBS's Andrea Joyce became the first woman to co-host the network television coverage of the World Series. She co-hosted that World Series with Pat O'Brien. In 1995, NBC's Hannah Storm not only became the first woman to serve as solo host a World Series game, but also the first woman to preside over the World Series Trophy presentation.

In 2009, New York Yankees broadcaster Suzyn Waldman became the first woman to work a World Series game from the broadcast booth. On July 2, 2015, Jenny Cavnar became the first woman to provide analysis for a series of National League games in the radio booth, filling in on KOA for a Colorado Rockies game. (Cavnar was the fill-in play-by-play voice for the Colorado Rockies on April 23, 2018, when she stepped in the booth to call a game against the San Diego Padres.) On August 24, 2015, Jessica Mendoza was the first female analyst for a Major League Baseball game in the history of ESPN, during a game between the St. Louis Cardinals and the Arizona Diamondbacks. John Kruk, Dan Shulman, and Mendoza called the 2015 American League Wild Card Game on October 6, and Mendoza thus became the first female analyst in MLB postseason history. In 2019, Melanie Newman joined Suzie Cool as part of the first all-female broadcast team in professional baseball when she served as play-by-play broadcaster for the Salem Red Sox. In October 2020 Mendoza became the first female World Series analyst on any national broadcast platform; she was on ESPN's radio platform.

In 2021, an all-female broadcast crew called a Major League Baseball game for the first time; specifically, Sarah Langs, Heidi Watney, Lauren Gardner, Melanie Newman and Alanna Rizzo, called a YouTube Game of the Week featuring the Baltimore Orioles and Tampa Bay Rays at Tropicana Field. Before the 2024 season, the Oakland Athletics hired Jenny Cavnar as their full-time play-by-play announcer, making her the first female primary play-by-play announcer in MLB history. On May 13, 2024, in a game between the Oakland Athletics and the Houston Astros, Cavnar and Julia Morales became the first two women to do the play-by-play on television for the same MLB game. On August 26, 2024, Rylee Pay and Emma Tiedemann became the first pair of women to call a Boston Red Sox game. Rylee Pay became the Tacoma Rainiers's play-by-play announcer in 2025, making her the first female lead broadcaster in Triple-A baseball. On July 10, 2026, Madison Shipman became the first woman to call a regular-season Toronto Blue Jays game on television.

== Umpires ==
In 1904, Amanda Clement traveled to Hawarden, Iowa, to watch her brother Hank pitch in a semi-professional game. The umpire for the amateur game taking place before Hank's did not show, and Hank suggested that Amanda, who had played baseball with her brothers and was knowledgeable about the game, serve as the umpire. In so doing, Clement became the first woman paid to umpire a baseball game. Her performance was so well received that she was hired to umpire further semi-professional games. (Note: Sources differ on the year in which Clement umpired her first game. The Schenectady Gazette obituary of Clements places it in 1903, the South Dakota Sports Hall of Fame and the National Baseball Hall of Fame place it in 1904, and Sports Illustrated places it in 1905. Clements would have been either 15, 16, or 17 at the time.)

Now, if women were umpiring, none of this would happen. Do you suppose any ball player in the country would step up to a good-looking girl and say to her: 'You color-blind, pickle-brained, cross-eyed idiot, if you don't stop throwing the soup into me, I will distribute your feature all over this ground until the janitor will be compelled to soak you up with gasoline?' Of course, he wouldn't. Ball players aren't a bad lot. In fact, my experience is that they have more than the usual allowance of chivalry. And I don't believe there's anybody in the country that would speak rudely to a woman umpire, even if he thought his drive was 'safe by a mile' instead of a foul.

— Amanda Clement, interview with The Pittsburgh Press, 17 September 1906

Clement's umpiring career lasted six years, during which she officiated games in North Dakota, South Dakota, Minnesota, Iowa, and Nebraska. Unlike in modern games, during Clement's time games only had one umpire, who stood behind the pitcher and was responsible for calling strikes and balls, whether balls were fair or foul, and whether runners reached bases safely. Despite the danger umpires faced during this era Clement was treated respectfully by both players and fans, and became respected for her serious style and because she was insusceptible to bribery. Her popularity was so high that baseball marketers emphasized her officiating of games to bring in crowds. In 1906 Clement wrote an editorial for the Cincinnati Enquirer arguing that women made better umpires than men because men would not speak abusively towards female umpires. She would repeat this idea in interviews with other newspapers. Clement, a Congregationalist, refused to umpire on Sundays and stayed in the homes of clergymen while umpiring on the road. Clement earned between $15 and $25 per game, which she used to fund her college education, attending Yankton College for two years followed by two years at the University of Nebraska.

There were also several woman umpires in the early 1920s: one was Deana Ernest of Toledo, Ohio, who umpired semi-pro games in the area, and also managed a city league team there. Another was Nina Belle Hurst, a resident of Sawtelle, California, who umpired in the Southern California Baseball Managers Association. During World War II, there were also some women who umpired, including some the press jokingly referred to as "WUMPS" (women umpires). Among them was Lorraine Heinisch, of Kenosha WI, who umpired semi-pro games in 1943, including a championship game in Wichita, Kansas.

The first woman to umpire a professional game was Bernice Gera. A former Little League coach and a passionate fan of baseball, she entered umpiring school in 1967 (the first woman ever to attend the Fort Lauderdale Baseball School). On January 13, 1972, Gera won a discrimination suit against the National Association of Professional Baseball Leagues, winning an appeal from the Court of Appeals, New York state’s highest court, in a five-to-two decision that allowed her to be an umpire. Her first pro game was in the minor leagues in June 1972, a game between the Auburn Phillies and Geneva Rangers in the New York-Penn League, but after several disputed calls, she decided to resign and never umpired another professional game.

In 1988 Pam Postema became the first female umpire to officiate a Major League Baseball spring training game, and the last until Ria Cortesio in 2007.

Since 2017, Jen Pawol had been active as an umpire in the minor leagues. On August 9, 2025, Pawol made her MLB debut, becoming the first woman to umpire an MLB game during the regular season. She appeared as the first base umpire in the first game of a doubleheader between the Miami Marlins and Atlanta Braves at Truist Park in Atlanta, and was third base umpire in the second game. She continued as an umpire on Sunday, August 10, becoming the first female home plate umpire in an MLB regular-season game, in another game between the Braves and Marlins.

On August 29, 2025, Omairy Guzmán became the first female umpire in a game in the Dominican Republic Professional Baseball League; she was the third base umpire in a game between the Mineros de Bonao and the Atléticos de Puerto Plata.

== Executives ==
Since 2000, Jane Forbes Clark has served as the chairwoman of the Board of Directors at the National Baseball Hall of Fame and Museum.

The first woman to own a baseball team was Helene Hathaway Britton, who owned the St. Louis Cardinals National League baseball team from 1911 through 1916. She, among other things, initiated a Ladies' Day promotion for Mondays, allowing women free entry to the park if accompanied by a man. Margaret Donahue was the first female front office executive in Major League Baseball who was not an owner. She worked for the Chicago Cubs from 1919 to 1958 and introduced marketing concepts such as the season ticket and reduced prices for children under 12, both still used in the 2000s. Since then, many women have held executive positions in business and financial areas of Major League Baseball. Yet, there have not been many women who have become player personnel, though, there are women who have been hired as general managers (GMs) for minor league affiliates. However, these positions are not responsible for player personnel moves, since roster maneuvers are handled by front-office personnel of the minor league affiliate's major league parent team.

One woman who has a position in player personnel at the Major League level is Kim Ng. She first worked for the Chicago White Sox, where she successfully presented an arbitration case. After working for the American League as director of waivers and records, she was hired as Assistant GM by the New York Yankees. When she left the Yankees in 2001 for the same position with the Los Angeles Dodgers, the Yankees hired another woman to replace her, Jean Afterman. Afterman still holds the same position as of July 2015. Kim Ng later moved on to work for Major League Baseball as Senior Vice President of Baseball Operations. In 2020, she was hired by the Miami Marlins as the first woman to serve as general manager of an MLB team. On September 30, 2023, with the Marlins' 7–3 win in Pittsburgh, the Marlins clinched their fourth postseason berth, making Kim Ng the first woman GM in MLB history to lead a playoff team. It was the club's first postseason appearance since 2020, although Ng's team was immediately eliminated without a playoff win. In October, Ng declined to exercise her option for the 2024 season, reportedly because she learned the team sought to hire a president of baseball operations, which would have left her second in command in her department.

== Coaching ==
Several women have made milestone firsts as coaches, including:

- Rachel Balkovec
  - 2019: Balkovec became the first woman hired to be a full-time hitting coach for a Major League Baseball team.
  - 2022, the Yankees announced that Balkovec will manage the Low-A Tampa Tarpons in 2022, making her the first woman to manage in affiliated baseball.
- Justine Siegal
  - 2009: Siegal becomes the first female coach of a men's professional baseball team
  - 2015: Siegal becomes the Oakland Athletics guest instructor for their Instructional League Club, thus making her the first female coach in major league baseball history
  - 2019: Siegal becomes the first woman to coach Japanese Professional Baseball
  - 2019: Siegal becomes the first woman to coach Professional Baseball in Mexico
  - 2023: Siegal becomes the first woman to coach in the Mexican Baseball League
- Alyssa Nakken
  - 2020: Nakken became the first full-time female coach in Major League Baseball history and the first to coach on the field during a major league pre-season game.
  - 2022: Nakken became the first woman to coach on the field in a regular season major league game on April 12, 2022, when the Giants substituted Nakken into the game as the first base coach after Antoan Richardson was ejected during the top of the third inning of a game against the San Diego Padres.
  - 2023: Nakken was interviewed for a managerial position with the San Francisco Giants, making her the first woman to interview for any managerial position with a Major League Baseball team.
- Bianca Smith
  - 2021: Smith was hired by the Boston Red Sox as a minor league coach, making her the first African American woman to serve as a coach in a professional baseball organization.

== See also ==
- Toni Stone, Mamie Johnson, Connie Morgan (the only three women to play in the Negro leagues)
- Women's baseball
