= Tiffany Brooks (baseball) =

American baseball player

- RHP, 1B
- Born: February 18, 1977 (age 48); Chico, California, U.S.
- Bats: Right Handed Throws: Right Handed

Continental Baseball League debut
- March 4, 2010, for the Big Bend Cowboys

Tiffany Brooks (born February 18, 1977) is an American former right-handed pitcher and first baseman in independent league baseball.

Brooks was the first female baseball pitcher in the 21st century to sign a contract with a professional American men's baseball team when she signed with the Big Bend Cowboys of the Continental Baseball League. After successfully completing Spring Training (April 30 – May 4, 2010) in Alpine, Texas, Brooks was the first woman to make an American men's professional baseball Opening Day roster since Ila Borders in 2000. Brooks had a brief stint with the team before seeking her own release to pursue other playing opportunities.

Tiffany Brooks is also the first and only female baseball player to ever play in all three Independent professional instructional leagues: California Winter League, Arizona Summer League, and Arizona Winter League. She is the first and only female player to compete in the California Winter League (2011), the Arizona Summer League (2011), the World Free Agent Spring Training event in Florida (2012), and one of two women to ever compete in the Arizona Winter League (2010).

== Accomplishments ==
- Second American female ballplayer (any position) in the 21st century to sign with a professional men's baseball team.
- First woman on the Hollywood Legends Barnstorming Baseball Club (team composed of ex-MLB players including Bill Madlock, Darrell Evans, and Bill Lee, 2010)
- First woman to play in 100-year history of Dutch Men's Baseball League (2007)
- Only woman to participate in the NABA Men's World Series (2009)
- Third woman worldwide to sign a professional men's baseball contract since 2000
- Third American (fourth worldwide) female pitcher to sign since the 1950s (Mamie Johnson, Indianapolis Clowns, 1953; Ila Borders, 1997, St. Paul Saints).
- Two-time silver medalist in international women's club baseball competition (Phoenix Cup Hong Kong International Women's Baseball Tournament, 2008—North Stars; 2009—North American Liberty Belles).

== Current career ==
As of 2017, Tiffany Brooks is a free agent. She presently runs her own baseball and softball academy in Spokane, Washington, called Brooks Baseball and Softball Academy. She is featured in the books The Bus Leagues Experience, Volumes 1 and 2.

== Filmography ==
- Brother Vs. Brother (2016) – Celebrity judge during Season 4
- Throw Like a Girl (forthcoming; currently in post-production)

== See also ==
- Women in baseball
