= Margaret Donahue =

American baseball executive (1892–1978)

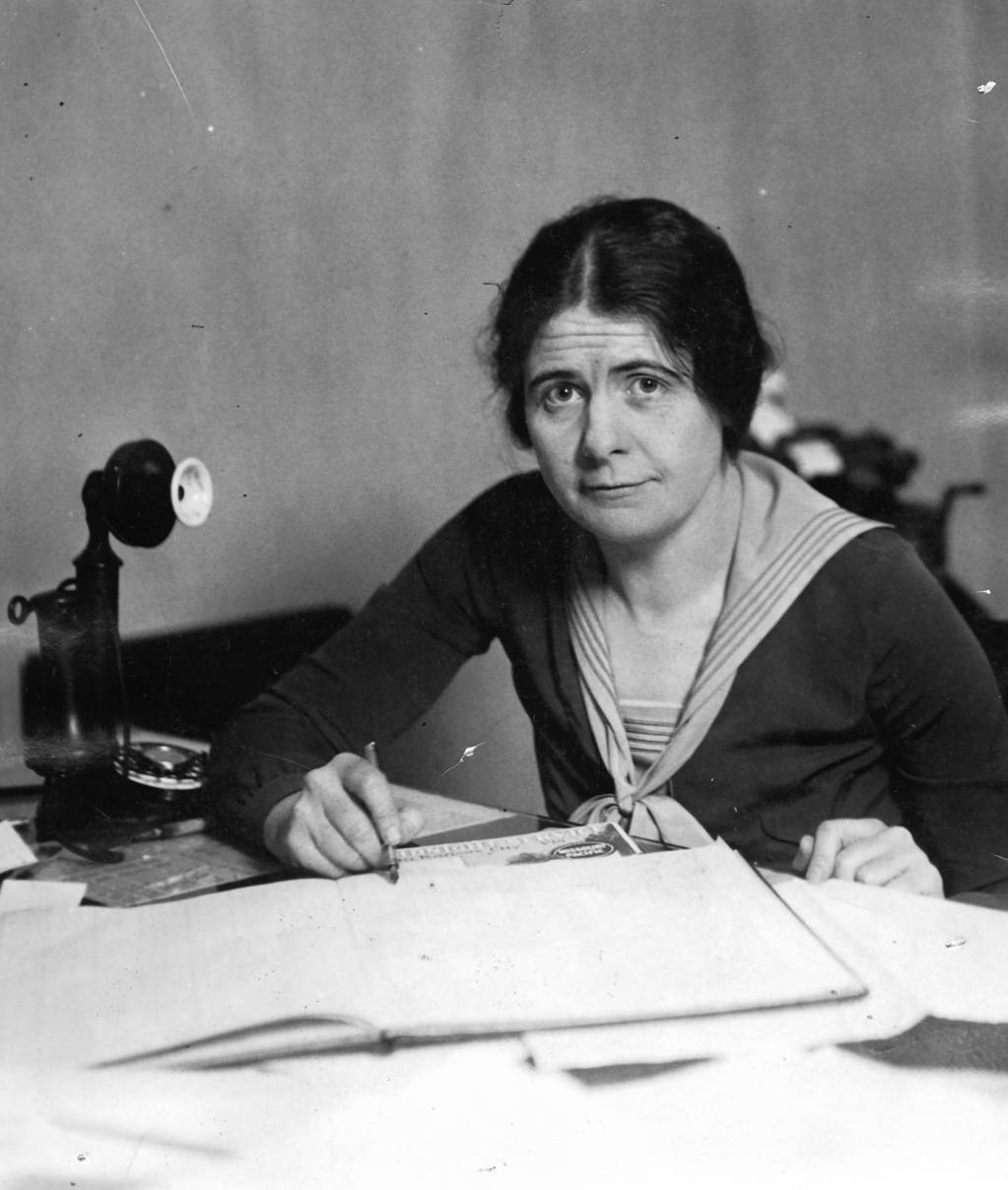
- Donahue in 1926
- Born: December 13, 1892; Huntley, Illinois, US
- Died: January 30, 1978 (aged 85); Crystal Lake, Illinois, US
- Occupation(s): Secretary, vice president
- Years active: 1919–1958
- Employer: Chicago Cubs

Margaret Donahue (December 13, 1892 – January 30, 1978) was an American professional baseball executive who worked in the front office of the Chicago Cubs of Major League Baseball (MLB) from 1919 to 1958. Donahue was the first female executive in MLB history and pioneered the sale of season tickets and other innovations.

== Early life ==
Donahue was born and raised on a farm in Huntley, Illinois, a suburb of Chicago, in 1892. She attended Huntley High School in 1909. After one year of high school, she dropped out and moved to Chicago to work as a secretary. She had one year of training and then worked for a laundry.

== Chicago Cubs ==
William Veeck Sr., the president of the Chicago Cubs of Major League Baseball, hired Donahue in 1919 as a stenographer for Bill Veeck, his son. In 1926, Veeck promoted Donahue to secretary, making her the first female executive in MLB.

Before the 1929 season, Donahue came up with the idea of selling season tickets. She also conceived of the idea of selling tickets at Western Union locations in addition to the box office. Donahue held "Ladies' Day" promotions and sold discounted tickets to children younger than 12 years of age, helping baseball to evolve from a game watched by businessmen in suits to a family event. Donahue worked for the Chicago Bears of the National Football League in their box office when they played at Wrigley Field from 1921 into the 1930s.

In 1950, the Cubs promoted Donahue to vice president. She retired in 1958.

== Personal life ==
While she worked for the Cubs, Donahue lived in Rogers Park, Chicago with her brother and two sisters. In her later years, Donahue lived in a nursing home in Crystal Lake, Illinois. She died on January 30, 1978.

A 0.5-acre (0.20 ha) park on the North Side of Chicago on West School Street, a few blocks from Wrigley Field, is named for Donahue. The Cubs contributed $1 million of the $1.3 million cost for Margaret Donahue Park, which broke ground in 2014. Donahue was inducted into the Chicago Cubs Hall of Fame in 2021.

== See also ==
- Women in baseball
