= Bianca Smith =

Professional baseball coach

- Coach
- Born: March 1991 (age 35); Sewickley, Pennsylvania, U.S.
- Bats: Right Throws: Right

Bianca Smith (born March 1991) is an American professional baseball coach. During the 2021 season, she became the first African American woman to serve as a professional baseball coach, working in the Boston Red Sox organization.

== Early life and education ==
Smith was born in Sewickley, Pennsylvania, and moved to Grapevine, Texas, at age 6 or 7. Her father, Victor Smith, played college football at Dartmouth College from 1985 to 1987; her mother, Dawn Patterson (d. 2013), was also a Dartmouth alumna and an attorney. Her mother was a New York Yankees fan who passed her love of the sport on to Smith. Her step-brother, Reggie Cannon, is a professional soccer player.

Smith attended Colleyville Heritage High School in Dallas, where she played softball and was a co-captain in her senior year. She graduated high school in 2008. She next enrolled at Dartmouth College, where she played on both the varsity softball team and the club baseball team. She graduated from Dartmouth with a bachelor's degree in sociology in 2012.

With an eye on pursuing a career as a baseball general manager, Smith obtained a J.D. degree and an MBA in sports management from Case Western Reserve University in 2017. At the same time, from 2013 to 2017, Smith worked as director of baseball operations for the Case Western Reserve Spartans.

== Coaching career ==
In 2018, Smith was a volunteer assistant coach for the University of Dallas college baseball team, as well as an intern in the baseball operations departments of the Texas Rangers. She also interned at Major League Baseball corporate headquarters. In 2019, she was a baseball operations trainee with the Cincinnati Reds. In August 2019, she was hired as assistant athletic director for compliance and administration, and assistant baseball coach and hitting coordinator, at Carroll University in Wisconsin. Her coaching relied heavily on statistical metrics and data analysis.

On December 31, 2020, The Boston Globe reported that the Boston Red Sox would hire Smith as a minor league coach, to be based in Fort Myers, Florida, working with position players. On January 4, 2021, the Red Sox made the hiring official. Per the Red Sox' 2021 minor league assignments, she became part of the coaching staff assigned to the team's Fenway South complex, led by manager Tom Kotchman. With that assignment, Smith became the first African American woman to serve as a coach in a professional baseball organization. She received sponsorships from Nike, Oakley, and Topps.

In 2022, Smith returned as a coach at the Fort Myers complex, and later served as a coach for the Scottsdale Scorpions of the Arizona Fall League. In 2023, Smith declined an offer to remain as a coach in the Red Sox organization, opting to look for a new opportunity.

== See also ==
- Jennifer King – first full-time African American woman coach in National Football League
- Alyssa Nakken – first full-time female coach in Major League Baseball
- Buck O'Neil – first African American coach in Major League Baseball
- Women in baseball
