= Jackie Mitchell =

Baseball player (1913-1987)

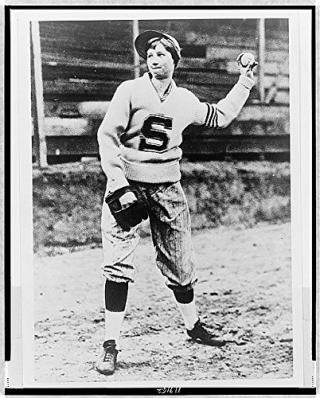
- Pitcher
- Born: August 29, 1913; Chattanooga, Tennessee, U.S.
- Died: January 7, 1987 (aged 73); Fort Oglethorpe, Georgia, U.S.
- Threw: Left

Southern Association debut
- April 2, 1931, for the Chattanooga Lookouts

Last appearance
- 1937

Teams
- Chattanooga Lookouts (1931); Chattanooga Engelettes; House of David

Virne Beatrice "Jackie" Mitchell Gilbert (August 29, 1913 – January 7, 1987) was one of the first female American pitchers in professional baseball history. She was 17 years old when she pitched for the Chattanooga Lookouts Class AA minor league baseball team in an exhibition game against the New York Yankees, and struck out Babe Ruth and Lou Gehrig in succession.

== Early life ==
Jackie Mitchell was born on August 29, 1913, in Chattanooga, Tennessee, to Virne Wall Mitchell and Dr. Joseph Mitchell. When she learned how to walk, her father took her to the baseball diamond and taught her the basics of the game. Her next door neighbor, Dazzy Vance, taught her to pitch and showed her his "drop ball", a type of breaking ball. Vance was a major league pitcher and would eventually be inducted into the Baseball Hall of Fame.

At the age of 17, Mitchell began playing for the Engelettes, a women's team in Chattanooga, Tennessee, and went on to attend a baseball training camp in Atlanta, Georgia. In doing so she attracted the attention of Joe Engel, the president and owner of the Chattanooga Lookouts, who was known for using publicity stunts as a way to draw crowds during the Great Depression. Seeing Mitchell as an opportunity to draw attention to the Lookouts, he signed her to the team on March 25, 1931. She appeared in her first professional game on April 2, becoming only the second woman to play organized baseball, behind Lizzie Arlington who pitched for the Reading Coal Heavers against the Allentown Peanuts in a minor league game in 1898.

== Against the New York Yankees ==
The New York Yankees and the Chattanooga Lookouts were scheduled to play an exhibition game in Chattanooga, Tennessee, on April 1, 1931; however, due to rain the game was postponed until the next day. When Babe Ruth was told he would be facing Mitchell the next day, he said "I don't know what's going to happen if they begin to let women in baseball. Of course, they will never make good. Why? Because they are too delicate. It would kill them to play ball every day."

On April 2, Mitchell, age 17, was brought in to pitch during the first inning by Lookouts manager Bert Niehoff after the starting pitcher, Clyde Barfoot, gave up a double and a single. The next two batters were Ruth and Gehrig. Ruth swung at two pitches before letting a third strike pass, flinging his bat in frustration as he trudged back to the bench. Gehrig followed, swinging and missing at every pitch. The next batter, Tony Lazzeri, tried a bunt on the first offering but eventually drew a walk on four straight balls. Then, Barfoot returned to the mound to take over from Mitchell. Mitchell’s appearance, though brief, left a lasting mark by striking out two of the game’s top hitters.

== Later career ==
Some modern reports say that later in 1931, baseball commissioner Kenesaw Mountain Landis banned her from exhibition games. However, Mitchell continued to play professionally, barnstorming with the House of David, a men's team famous for their very long hair and long beards. While traveling with the House of David team, she would sometimes wear a fake beard for publicity.

Mitchell retired in 1937 at the age of 23 after becoming furious since her story about playing baseball was being used as something of a side show – once being asked to pitch while riding a donkey. She refused to come out of retirement when the All-American Girls Professional Baseball League formed in 1943. Major League Baseball would formally ban the signing of women to contracts on June 21, 1952. The ban lasted until 1992 when Carey Schueler was drafted by the Chicago White Sox for the 1993 season.

In 1982 Mitchell was invited to throw out the ceremonial first pitch for the Chattanooga Lookouts on their season opening day.

Jackie Mitchell died in Fort Oglethorpe, Georgia, on January 7, 1987, and was buried in Forest Hills Cemetery in Chattanooga.

== Legacy ==
A musical about Mitchell's life entitled Unbelievable was developed by Kevin Fogarty (lyrics), Rachel DeVore Fogarty (music), and John Robert DeVore (book). It debuted in a staged reading on March 17, 2017, at Skyline Theatre Company in Bergen County, New Jersey.

On May 27, 2017, the Chattanooga Lookouts honored Mitchell with a limited edition bobblehead to the 1st 1,000 fans who entered the stadium.

In his "60 Moments" series with The Athletic, sportswriters Joe Posnanski ranked Mitchell's game against the Yankees as No. 27 on the list of most memorable baseball moments.

== See also ==
- Women in baseball
