= Dolly Vardens (baseball team) =

Dolly Vardens was a recurring name used for a number of baseball teams throughout the United States in the early decades of baseball (1860s-1880s). Most were white, male squads, though there was an all-female, African-American team from Chester, Pennsylvania, assembled by barber-turned-sports entrepreneur John Lang in the 1880s.

According to 19th century reports, in May 1883 in Chester's Lamokin Woods, a team of Black female players led by shortstop Ella Harris played against an unnamed team in a contest that was considered "a failure."

Apparently, there were two different semi-professional Dolly Varden teams, and one of them played a third club known as "Captain Jinks" in a game declared a draw after 15 innings. A newspaper report of the game included a long description about the opening coin toss plus a "lengthy discussion about a player getting a thorn stuck in her foot after chasing a foul ball into the woods, but not a ton of attention was paid to the quality of play."

Overall, these teams of Black women players were considered to be only a novelty, rather than a competitive organization, who played for the entertainment of spectators. (MLB official historian John Thorn notes, "Lang’s Dolly Vardens, created in the 1880s, are sometimes confused with several Philadelphia-area all-male clubs bearing that name as early as 1867.")

The name was taken from a character in the 1841 novel Barnaby Rudge, by Charles Dickens. Dolly Varden is also the name of a Hell's Kitchen, NYC restaurant as well as the moniker of the last passenger train locomotive to run up Manhattan's West Side.

== See also ==
- Women in baseball
