= Margaret Gisolo =

Baseball player (1914–2009)

Margaret Gisolo (October 21, 1914 – October 20, 2009) was an American sportswoman and educator who while still a child was a pioneer in the history of women in baseball as the first girl to play American Legion baseball, a predecessor of Little League. At the time, she was "featured in newspapers across the country". Later, she played a significant role in the development of Arizona State University's School of Dance into one of the best in the USA.

== Baseball ==
She was taught to play baseball by an older brother, who played minor league baseball at a semi-professional level. In 1928 Gisolo played for the Blanford Cubs from Blanford, Indiana in the American Legion junior baseball program, a program for children aged 14 to 16. With her team's growing success, she achieved considerable fame, with the New York Times calling her "The Girl Babe Ruth of Blanford, Ind", and her progress was tracked by "every media outlet from rural weeklies to Movietone News".

When her team defeated the Clinton Baptists, the losing team complained that regulations said "any boy was permitted to play" meaning girls were excluded, and therefore Gisolo should not have been playing. However, the administrators decided that in view of the role women had played in wartime and in the American Legion, there was no reason why she could not continue. Blanford went on to win the state championship on the way to a semifinal defeat in the national championship. The following year, the American Legion banned girls from baseball, citing the expense of separate facilities.

== Later life ==
After her school education in Jacksonville Elementary School in Blanford, and Clinton High School in Clinton, Indiana, from which she graduated in 1931, she attended college, gaining her bachelor's degree from Indiana State University in 1935 and a Master of Arts from New York University in 1942. Gisolo also played baseball on barnstorming teams, with Maud Nelson among others. During World War II, she served as an officer in the U.S. Navy WAVES, becoming a lieutenant commander.

After the war, she taught dance at Indiana University of Pennsylvania from 1947 to 1952. She joined the faculty at Arizona State University in 1954, co-founding a School of Dance based on the modern dance component of the physical education department, which became "one of the top university dance programs in the country" with her as chair. There her students including baseball player Reggie Jackson; she is also cited by dancer Bill Evans as his "dance mother".

After her retirement from Arizona State, she played seniors tennis, and was nationally ranked until retiring aged 86: at her retirement she was ranked first in doubles and second in singles for her age group.

She died in Tempe, Arizona on October 20, 2009, shortly before her 95th birthday.

== Awards ==
- 1979 Arizona State University Distinguished Teacher Award
- 1982 Distinguished Alumna of Indiana State University
- 1994 Honorary doctorate from Arizona State University
- 1996 Honorary doctorate from Indiana State University
- 1998 Inducted into Indiana State University Athletics Hall of Fame
- 2004 Inducted into National Italian American Sports Hall of Fame

== Further information ==
- Ladd, T. Sexual Discrimination in Youth Sport: The Case of Margaret Gisolo. In, Howell, R. (ed.), Her Story in Sport: An Historical Anthology of Women in Sports. West Point, NY: Leisure Press, c1982. pp 579–598
- Combs, Brenda M. Margaret Gisolo, October 21, 1914-October 20, 2009: a celebration of life. Arizona: Lavender Sun Productions, 2009 (DVD)
