= Rachel Balkovec =

American baseball coach (born 1987)

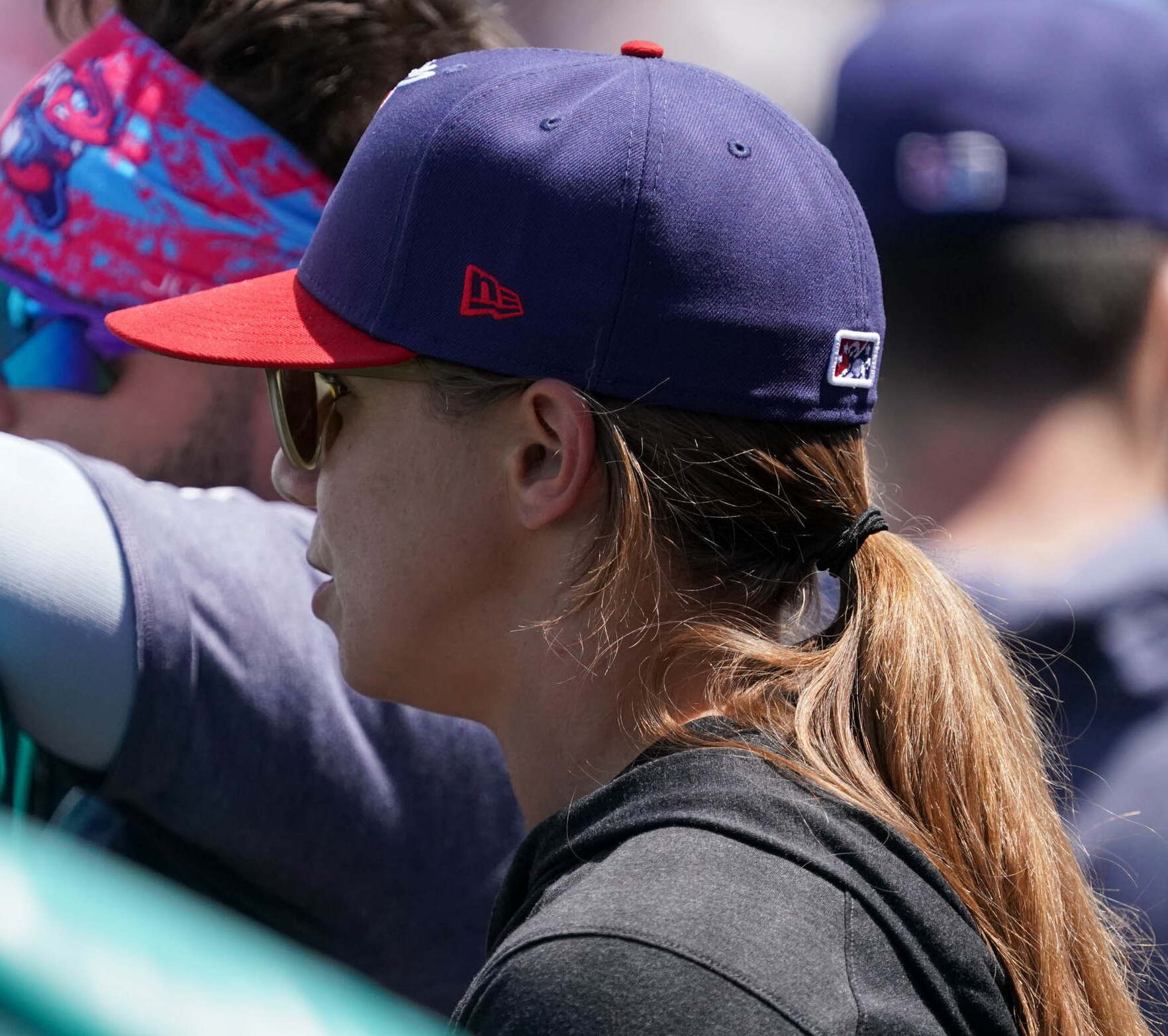
- Balkovec during a Jacksonville Jumbo Shrimp game at Werner Park in 2024
- Born: July 5, 1987 (age 39); Omaha, Nebraska
- Occupation: Director of Player Development
- Employer: Miami Marlins
- Known for: first full-time female hitting coach in Minor League Baseball and first full-time female manager in Minor League Baseball.

Rachel Balkovec (born July 5, 1987) is an American minor league baseball manager who is currently the director of player development for the Miami Marlins. In 2022, the New York Yankees named Balkovec manager of their Single–A minor league team, the Tampa Tarpons, making her the first woman to work as a full-time manager of a major league-affiliated team.

== Early life ==
Balkovec grew up in Omaha, Nebraska. She has two sisters. Her father worked as a customer service manager for American Airlines, and her mother was a bookkeeper.

As a student at Skutt Catholic High School in Omaha, Balkovec played softball, soccer, and basketball. She initially attended Creighton University, where she was a catcher on the Creighton Bluejays softball team, but transferred to the University of New Mexico, where she also played catcher for the New Mexico Lobos. She graduated from New Mexico in 2009 with a bachelor's degree in exercise science. She then earned her master's degree from Louisiana State University in kinesiology. In 2018, she enrolled in Vrije University in the Netherlands to study human movement sciences, earning her second master's degree.

== Career ==
Balkovec began her career in 2012 as a temporary contract strength and conditioning coach for the Johnson City Cardinals, the Rookie league affiliate of the St. Louis Cardinals. In that role, she won the Appalachian League's award for strength coach of the year. In 2014, she assumed a full-time role as Johnson City affiliate's strength and conditioning coach, the first time a woman had held that role in baseball.

In 2016, Balkovec was hired by the Houston Astros to be their Latin American strength and conditioning coordinator. She learned Spanish for the position, so she could better communicate with players. She was the first woman in that role in Major League Baseball. In 2018, she was promoted to be the Double–A Corpus Christi Hooks' strength and conditioning coach.

After moving to the Netherlands to pursue a second master's degree at Vrije University, Balkovec worked for the Dutch baseball and softball programs as an assistant hitting coach. After graduating, she returned to the United States to work at a fellowship at Driveline Baseball, researching hitters' eye tracking and pitchers' hip movement.

In November 2019, Balkovec was announced as the New York Yankees' newest Minor League hitting coach, to start in spring training 2020, again the first woman to hold such a position full-time. She also interviewed for a position as a quality control coach with the San Francisco Giants in fall 2019, but decided to take the Yankees' role.

Since the COVID-19 pandemic canceled the 2020 Minor League Baseball season, she coached in the Australian Baseball League. She was part of the coaching staff of the 2021 All-Star Futures Game.

On January 11, 2022, the Yankees announced that Balkovec would manage the Low–A Tampa Tarpons in 2022, making her the first woman to manage in affiliated baseball. On April 8, 2022, the Tarpons defeated the Lakeland Flying Tigers 9-6, earning Balkovec her first win in her managerial debut in affiliated baseball.

On January 10, 2024, MLB.com reported Balkovec would be named Director of Player Development for the Miami Marlins as the team remakes its front office.

== Overcoming gender challenges ==
In 2013, she was waitressing and working at Lululemon, hoping to advance her coaching career, but after applying to 15 different teams in Phoenix and not hearing back, she changed her name on her resume and her email address from "Rachel" to "Rae". Rather than emphasize she had been a Division I college softball catcher, she only said she had been a Division I college catcher. This led to phone interviews, but once people heard her voice, the only offers were for women's sports, Balkovec says. One team, she says, told her they would never hire a woman.

== See also ==
- Women in baseball
