= Helene Hathaway Britton =

American baseball executive (1879–1950)

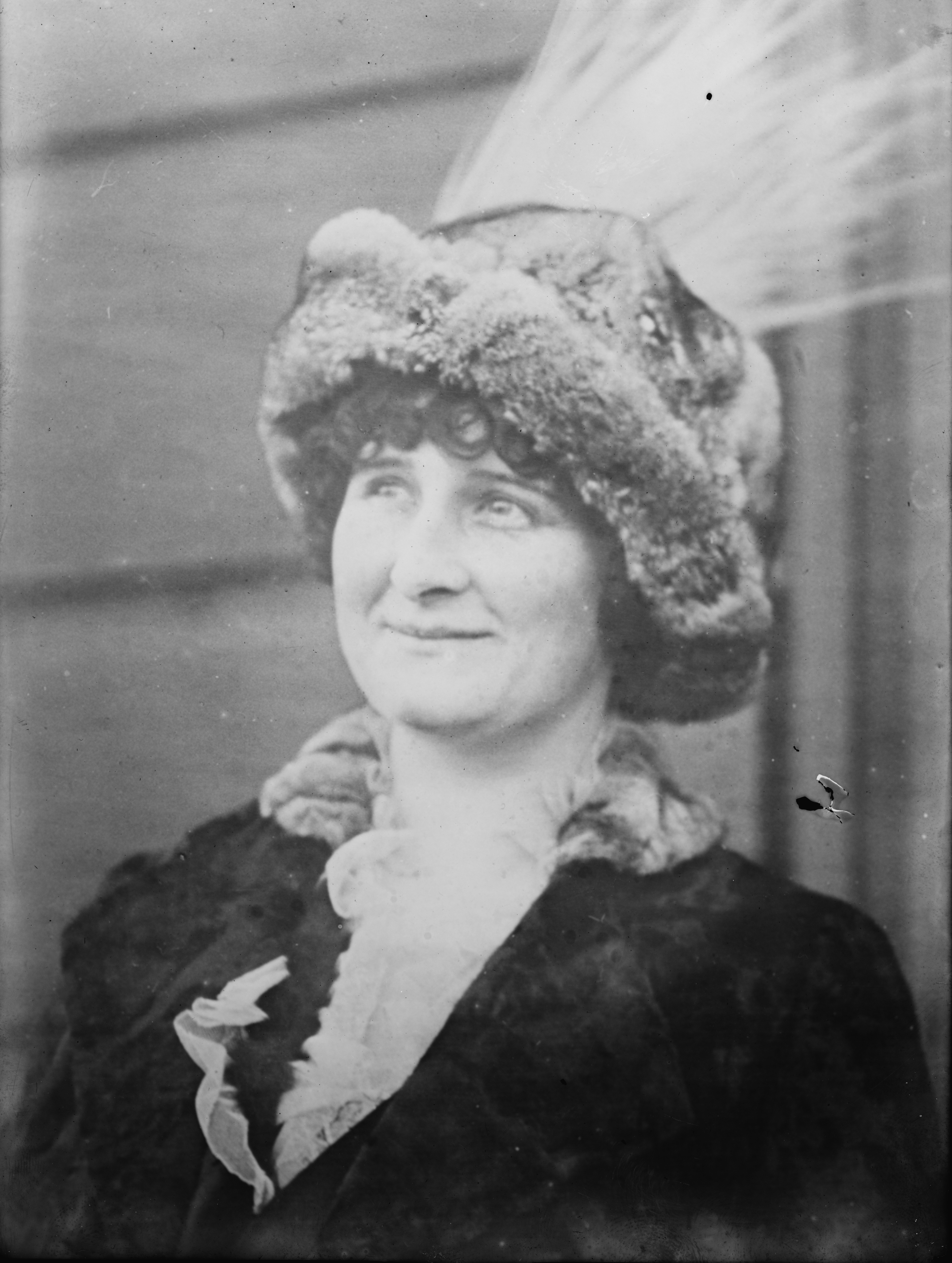
- Britton in 1915
- Born: January 30, 1879; Cleveland, Ohio, US
- Died: January 8, 1950 (aged 70); Philadelphia, Pennsylvania, US
- Known for: Owner of the St. Louis Cardinals (1911–1917)
- Spouses: Schuyler P. Britton (m. 1901; div. 1917); Charles S. Bigsby (m. 1918; died 1935)
- Family: Frank Robison (father); Stanley Robison (uncle)

Helene Hathaway Britton (née Robison; January 30, 1879 – January 8, 1950) was an American baseball executive. She owned the St. Louis Cardinals of the National League, and was the first woman to own a Major League Baseball franchise.

Britton was born and raised in Cleveland. Her father Frank and uncle Stanley Robison owned the Cardinals. After her uncle's death in 1911, Britton inherited the team from him. Despite receiving pressure to sell the team, Britton maintained ownership of the franchise until financial pressures led her to sell the team in 1917.

== Early life ==
Britton was born on January 30, 1879, in Cleveland, Ohio, to Frank DeHass Robison and Sarah Carver Hathaway. She was raised in Bratenahl, Ohio. Frank and his brother, Stanley Robison, owned a streetcar business in Cleveland as well as the Cleveland Spiders, a baseball team in the National League. Britton was raised as a baseball fan. In 1899, the Robison brothers purchased another National League team, the St. Louis Cardinals, and shifted their best players from Cleveland to St. Louis. The National League eliminated the Spiders after the 1899 season. Afterwards, Britton traveled with her father and uncle on their business trips to St. Louis to watch the Cardinals.

Britton was educated at the Hathaway Brown School in Shaker Heights, Ohio. She married Schuyler P. Britton, an attorney, on October 29, 1901. They had a son, Frank DeHaas Britton, and a daughter, Marie R. Britton.

== Owner of the St. Louis Cardinals ==
=== 1911–1913 ===
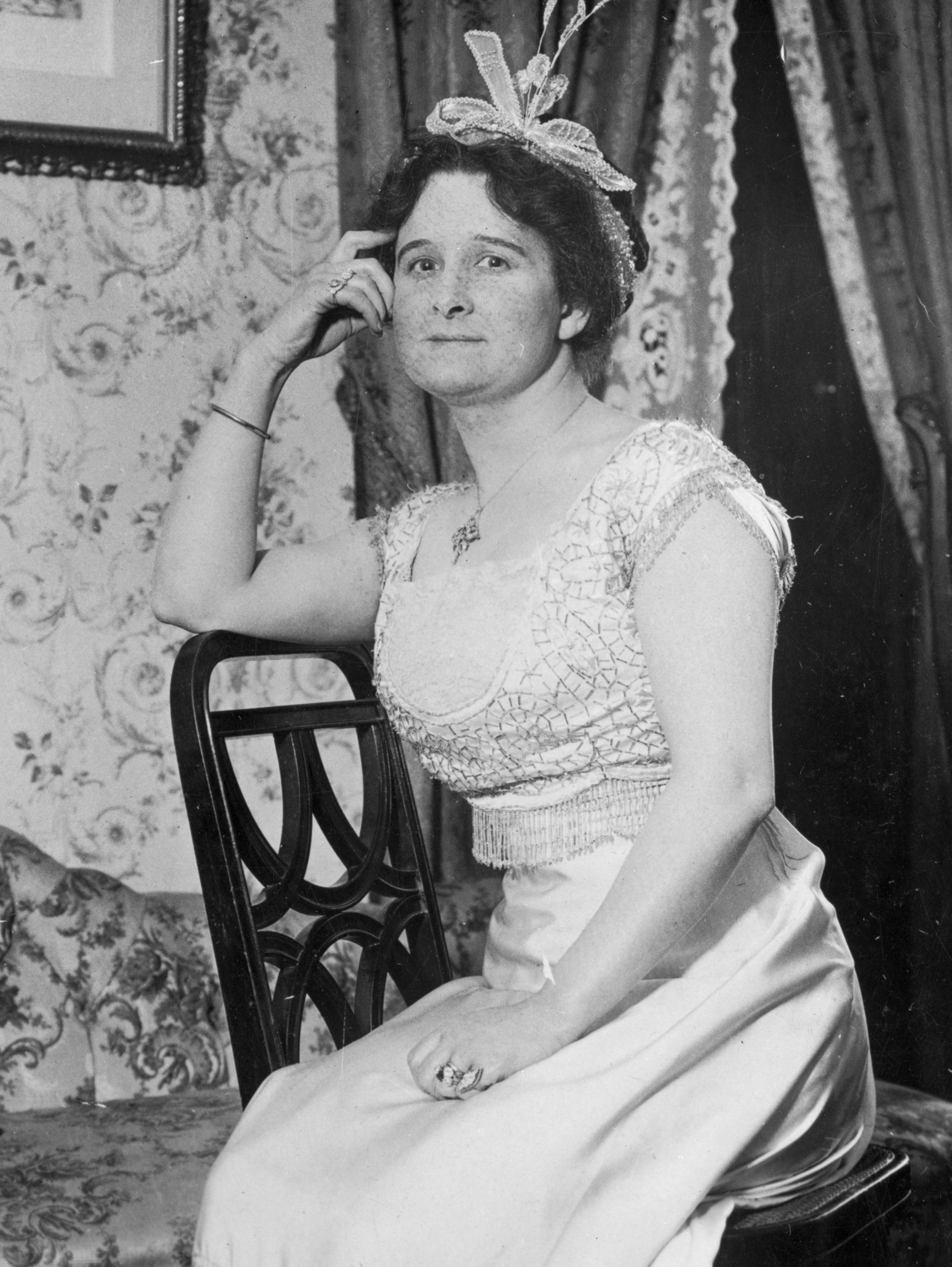
Britton in 1911

Britton's father died in 1908, and her uncle died in March 1911. He left Britton three-fourths of his estate, while the other one-fourth went to Britton's mother. Britton became the owner of the Cardinals, making her the first woman to own a Major League Baseball team. Robison named Frederick N. Abercrombie, the treasurer of the Cardinals, as the executor of his will, but Abercrombie challenged the will in court as he wanted Robison's purported original will to stand instead. The will went into probate and Edward E. Steininger, the president of the Cardinals, was made administrator of the estate. Britton had supported Steininger over Abercrombie.

Both Chicago businessman Charles Weeghman and James McGill, the president of the Denver Bears of the Western League, attempted to buy the Cardinals from Britton, but she resolved to keep the team. Britton attended National League meetings where other owners spent time trying to persuade her to sell the team because she was a woman.

Britton renamed the team's ballpark from League Park to Robison Field in honor of her uncle in 1911, and initiated a Ladies' Day promotion for Mondays, allowing women free entry to the park if accompanied by a man. The Cardinals had a strong season in 1911, and Britton signed player-manager Roger Bresnahan to a five-year contract worth $10,000 per season (approximately $346,000 in current dollar terms) with additional profit sharing in September. However, the 1912 season started off with Bresnahan moving the team's spring training location without consulting Britton. Britton and Bresnahan attacked each other publicly. Britton said under oath during her testimony that Bresnahan had offered her $500,000 (approximately $16.68 million in current dollar terms) to buy the team, and accused him of not trying to win to hasten her selling the team. Bresnahan was upset with Britton when she vetoed a trade that he arranged that would have sent Miller Huggins to the Chicago Cubs. Britton fired Bresnahan after the 1912 season. Bresnahan then petitioned the National Baseball Commission for the remaining salary on his contract, which Britton refused to pay. Britton hired Huggins, the team's second baseman, as the Cardinals' new player-manager. Britton and Bresnahan settled their dispute for $20,000 (approximately $667,000 in current dollar terms).

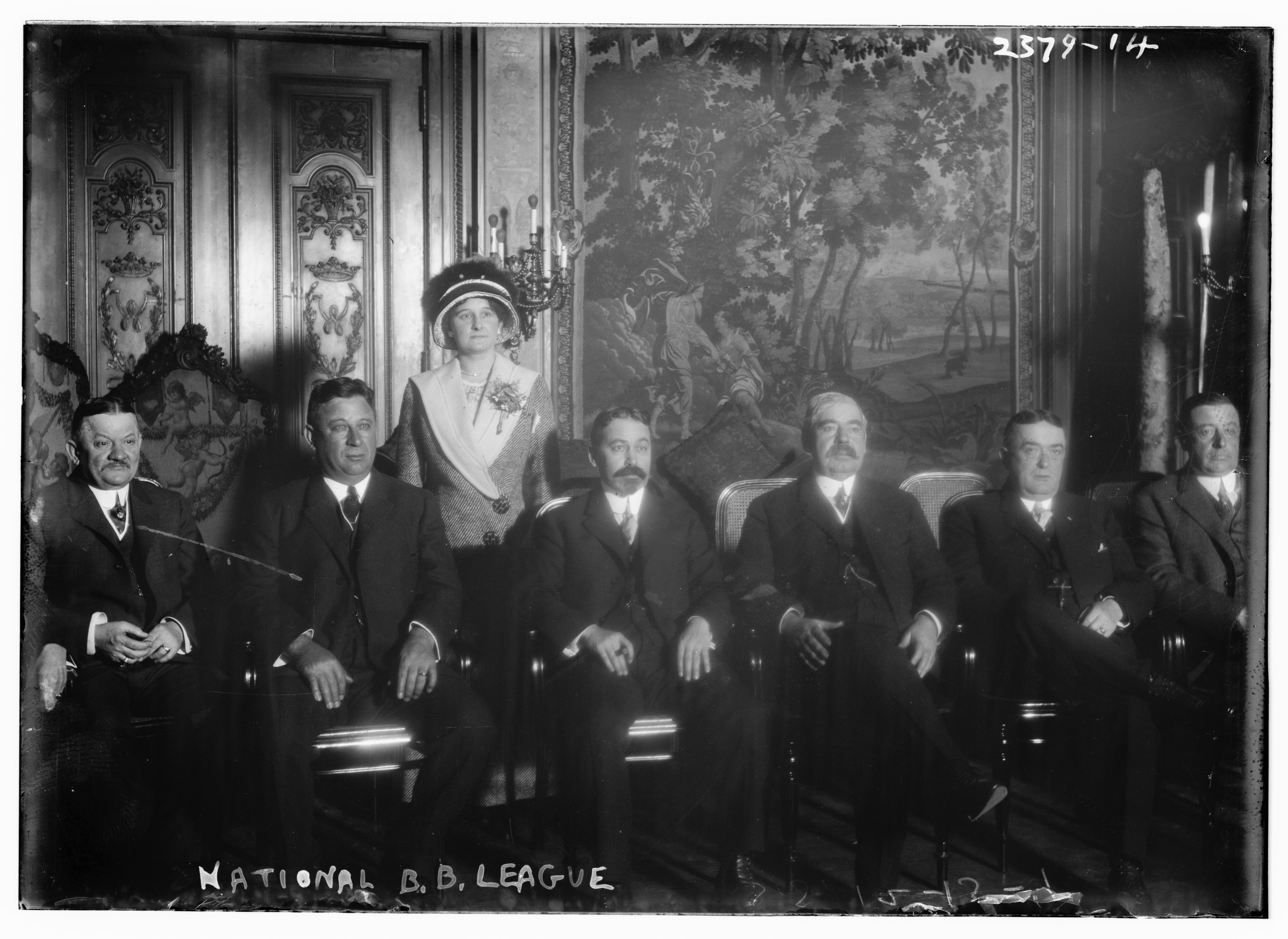
National League owners at the December 1911 league meeting

In April 1912, Britton and her mother sought an injunction against Steininger, who had been making decisions against Britton's wishes and not sharing all details of the business with her. Britton won the suit and acquired full control of the Cardinals in May 1912. Steininger resigned from the Cardinals in June and Britton appointed local attorney James C. Jones as team president. In February 1913, Schuyler P. Britton was elected team president and Helene Britton was elected vice president. However, Helene Britton continued to control the team through her husband.

Schuyler P. Britton

=== 1914–1917 ===
The debut of the St. Louis Terriers of the upstart Federal League in 1914 harmed attendance and revenues for the Cardinals. As the leagues began to discuss a peace agreement in 1915, offers to purchase the Cardinals resumed. At the league meetings in January 1916, where the peace agreement between the major leagues and the Federal League was established, Harry Ford Sinclair offered Britton $200,000 for the team (approximately $5,917,000 in current dollar terms), but she declined. A local syndicate offered Britton $375,000 (approximately $11.1 million in current dollar terms) for the team and ballpark in February 1916, but Britton reportedly wanted $400,000 (approximately $11.83 million in current dollar terms).

Britton separated from her husband in November 1916 and filed for divorce a few days later. Her husband resigned as team president and the board of directors elected Britton to succeed him in the role. In divorce court, Britton testified that her husband had "squandered her means to such an extent that her property was imperiled". The divorce was granted in February 1917, with the court awarding her custody of their two children.

By December 1916, Britton was willing to sell the Cardinals, if a buyer met her desired price. The conditions at Robison Field deteriorated to the point that a member of the St. Louis Board of Aldermen sent an open letter to National League president John K. Tener to seek his intervention. Britton rejected an offer made by a local syndicate for $250,000 in December 1916 (approximately $7.4 million in current dollar terms). In March 1917, James C. Jones, now a trustee for the Cardinals, put together a syndicate that began to raise money to buy the Cardinals. and paid Britton $25,000 (approximately $628,000 in current dollar terms) for a sixty-day option. They agreed on a price of $350,000 (approximately $8.8 million in current dollar terms) and the syndicate paid half to Britton in May. Branch Rickey took over as team president from Britton. The team was $175,000 in debt (approximately $4.4 million in current dollar terms) when Rickey took over.

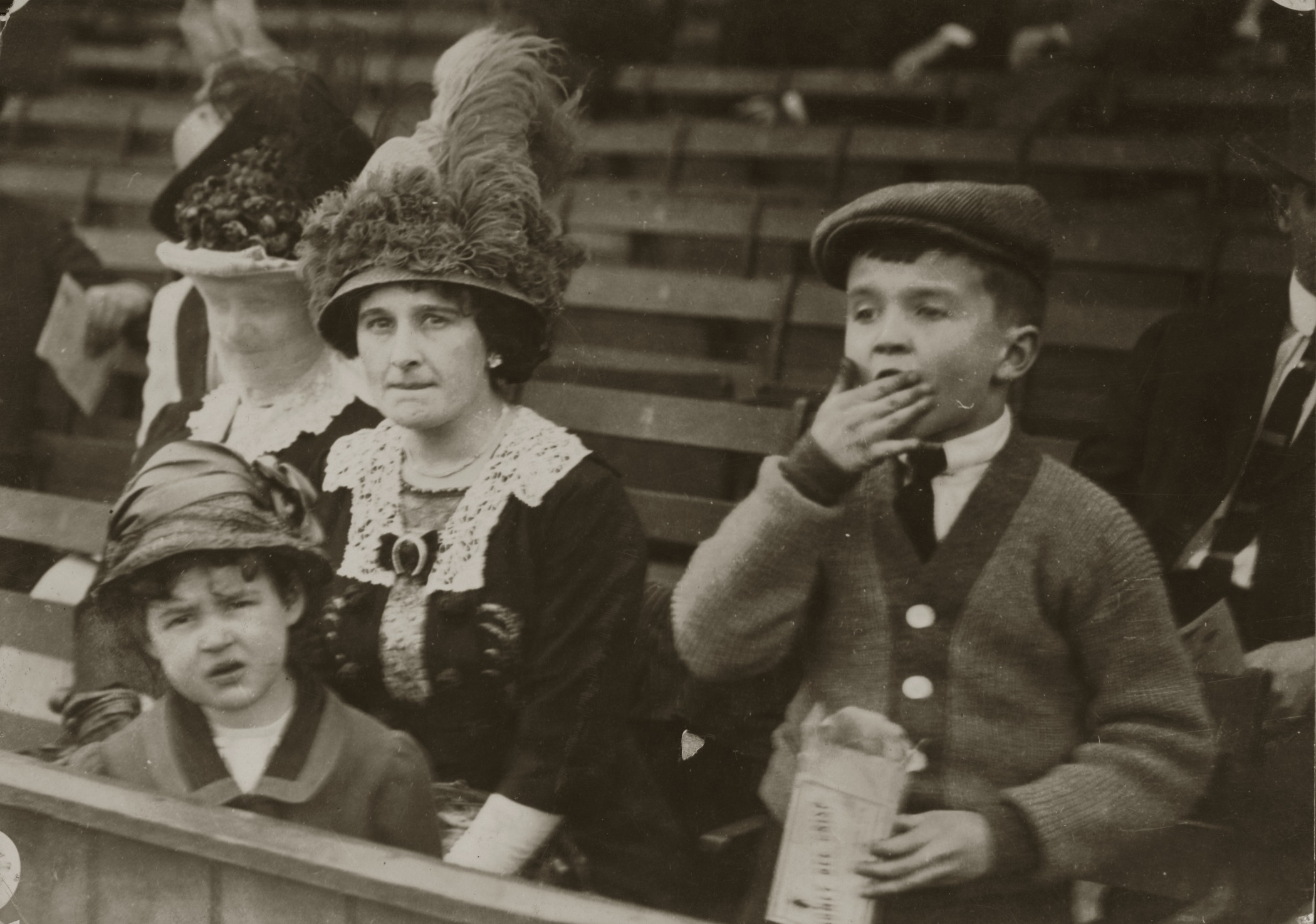
Britton at Robison Field with her two children

== Later life ==
After selling the Cardinals, Britton moved to Boston, Massachusetts. She married Charles S. Bigsby, who sold electrical appliances, on August 19, 1918. Bigsby died in 1935. In her later life, Britton lived in New York City and Upper Darby Township, Pennsylvania.

Britton died in Philadelphia, Pennsylvania, after a three-month illness on January 8, 1950. She was interred at Lake View Cemetery in Cleveland.

== See also ==
- Women in baseball
- List of female Major League Baseball principal owners
