= Ladies' Day (baseball) =

Baseball promotion for women baseball fans

Ladies' Day, also referred to as Ladies' Night if held during night games, was a baseball promotional event in Major League Baseball aimed at women baseball fans from early to mid 20th century. It was a common fixture at baseball stadiums until the rise of the Women's Liberation Movement in the 1970s, after which it was eventually discontinued as it was seen as being discriminatory to men.

== History ==
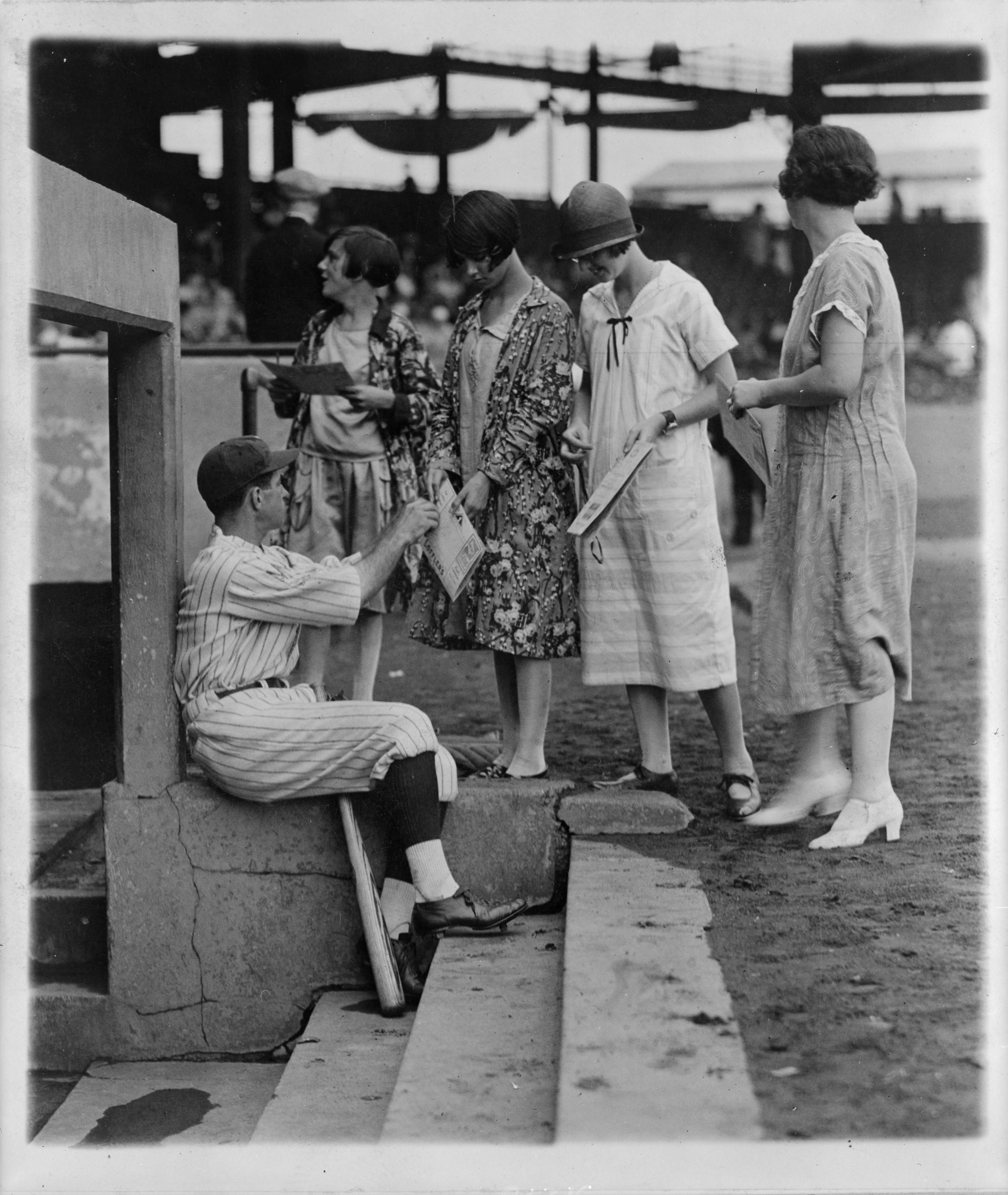
Future Hall of Famer Bucky Harris signing scorecards for women attendees on Ladies' Day, 1925

Though Ladies' Day had existed in baseball since the 19th century, the idea was to create an environment in the stands free of unsavory characters and conduct and to make baseball a family-oriented event. The New York Gothams reportedly held the first Ladies' Day in 1883.

Ladies' Day was reintroduced in 1913 by Helene Hathaway Britton, the owner of the St. Louis Cardinals and the first woman to own a baseball team. The Cardinals Ladies' Day promotion allowed women free entry to the park if accompanied by a man.

The promotion gained popularity after World War I. This was due, in part, to Charles Weeghman, owner of the Chicago Cubs. Weegham had used the promotion during his time with the short-lived Federal League as owner of the Chicago Whales and to promote the park which would eventually become known as Wrigley Field.

Ladies Day promotions began to decline after the case of Abosh v. New York Yankees, Inc. in 1972, where the New York State Human Rights Appeal Board ruled that Ladies' Day was discriminatory "in a modern technological society where women and men are to be on equal footing as a matter of public policy."

== Notable games on Ladies' Day/Night ==
- September 21, 1933: by a score of 2–1, the Washington Senators clinch the pennant on the final day of the season against the 1933 St. Louis Browns on Ladies' Day.
- May 13, 1940: Johnny Mize of the St. Louis Cardinals hits three home runs against the Cincinnati Reds. The game ended in an extra-innings tie, called due to darkness. The attendance was noted in The Cincinnati Enquirer as "6,606 paid, 9,370 women."
- May 18, 1957: At Crosley Field, Willie Mays steals four bases and hits a home run against the 1957 Cincinnati Redlegs.
- May 11, 1963: Sandy Koufax of the Los Angeles Dodgers no-hits the San Francisco Giants on Ladies' Night at Dodger Stadium, winning 8–0. It was his second career no-hitter.
- May 1, 1965: during a game between the Los Angeles Dodgers and San Francisco Giants, Dodgers' star hitter Tommy Davis breaks his ankle on a slide into second base, putting the Dodgers' pennant chances in jeopardy.
- August 26, 1981: Garry Templeton, star shortstop of the St. Louis Cardinals twice makes obscene gestures to fans who are booing him on Ladies' Day. Manager Whitey Herzog physically removed Templeton from the field and had a scuffle with him in the dugout. Templeton was fined $5000 and suspended for three weeks, during which he underwent psychiatric evaluation. The incident caused Templeton to be traded to the San Diego Padres for shortstop Ozzie Smith, who would go on to have a Hall of Fame career with the Cardinals.

== See also ==
- Women in baseball
