= Edith Houghton =

American baseball player and scout

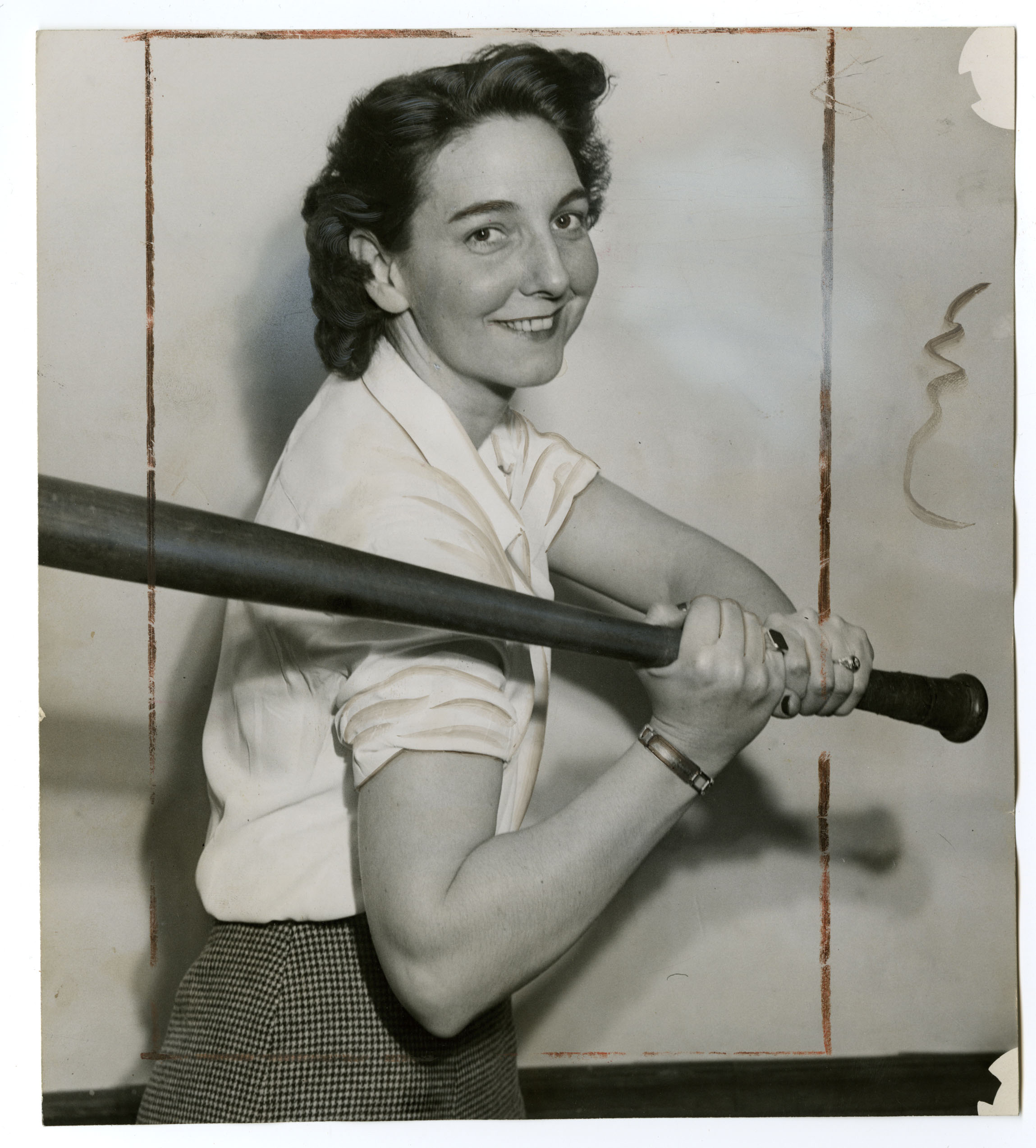
- Houghton, c. 1946

Personal information
- Full name: Edith Grace Houghton
- Nickname: The Kid
- Born: February 10, 1912 Philadelphia, Pennsylvania, U.S.
- Died: February 2, 2013 (aged 100) Sarasota, Florida, U.S.

Sport
- Country: United States
- Sport: Baseball
- Team: Philadelphia Bobbies, Hollywood Girls, New York Bloomer Girls
- Updated on 13 April 2016

Edith Grace Houghton (February 10, 1912 – February 2, 2013) was an American professional baseball player and scout. A former shortstop in women's baseball whose professional career began when she was ten years old, Houghton became the first female scout in Major League Baseball when she joined the talent-spotting staff of the Philadelphia Phillies of the National League in 1946. She served in that role until 1952, when she returned to active service in the United States Navy. She had joined the WAVES during World War II.

== Early life ==
Houghton was a native of the North Philadelphia neighborhood. Around 1917, Edith moved with her parents and nine older brothers and sisters to their brand-new house at 25th and Diamond Streets. Directly across Diamond Street, there was a large park with a baseball diamond. When the field was free, the kids in the neighborhood would start a game of baseball. The first position Edith played was shortstop. Her father, William L. Houghton, distributed goods for a large grocery company. He was also a skilled baseball player who taught his youngest daughter many techniques. As young as age six, Edith posed for photos in a baseball uniform. By the time she was eight, she dressed as the mascot for the Philadelphia police's baseball team. Family, friends, and fans dubbed Edith “The Kid.”

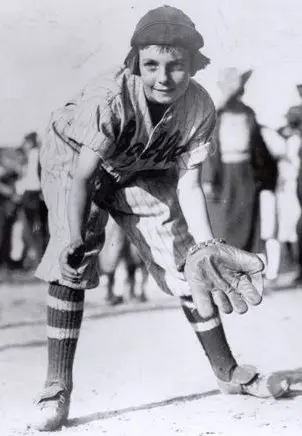
Edith Houghton as a child in her Philadelphia Bobbies baseball uniform c. 1922-1925

Too young to join a factory team, in 1922 the ten-year-old Edith tried out for the Philadelphia Bobbies, a semi-pro team for non-working girls. Houghton quickly became the star, her fielding and batting skills drew the attention of fans and reporters, as did her youth. Edith was the youngest on a team made up of mostly teenage girls. The Bobbies practiced in Fairmount Park, where Edith was a standout athlete and baseball player.

In 1925, she and the team travelled to Japan to play baseball against men; Houghton was then 13 years old. On September 23, 1925, they boarded a train at the North Broad Street Station, several blocks from Edith's house. Twelve Bobbies, their coach, and two men (to play pitcher and catcher) played eight games on their way to Seattle, en route to Yokohama. Once in Japan, they drew large crowds, especially at first. Edith impressed many Japanese reporters. Although they were contracted to play 15 games for $800, their finances fell through midway through the trip. Half the team headed to Formosa and back to the United States. The other half, including Edith, stayed in Kobe and luckily found a contributor to fund their trip home by December.

== Education ==
Houghton briefly attended the new Simon Gratz High School, which had many sports that she wanted to play. After six months, however, she went to Philadelphia High School for Girls on Spring Garden Street.

== Career ==
Edith went on to play for semi-pro baseball teams until she started softball in the 1930s. At that point women were pushed out of baseball into softball. Houghton later played with other women's pro teams such as the Hollywood Girls and the New York Bloomer Girls. In 1942, during World War II, she volunteered for the WAVES (Women Accepted for Volunteer Emergency Services). Although nominally a clerk, she was accepted into the department's baseball team. The Navy newsletter wrote that "enlisted WAVE Houghton... can make any ball team in the country." During her service, she was assigned to the procurement of WAVES and Navy Nurse clothing for the Bureau of Supplies and Accounts in Washington D.C. Houghton eventually became chief storekeeper. In December 1944, Houghton's unit was transferred to New York. In 1945, Houghton was discharged from the WAVES but was recruited again and became the Chief Master of Arms.

After the war, she took her skills to a new level. She approached Phillies’ owner R. R. M. Carpenter Jr. in 1946 asking for an interview, then met with Carpenter and general manager Herb Pennock. Soon the Phillies made national news: they hired Houghton as Major League Baseball's first female scout. From 1946 to 1952, she scouted players and signed fifteen to contracts, mostly from Philadelphia-area high schools.

External videos
- “Female Baseball Scout Turns 100”, SNN6

She left the team in 1952 and rejoined the Navy, where she served during the Korean and Vietnam wars and retired as a chief petty officer.

In 1964, Houghton left Philadelphia and moved to Sarasota, Florida, where she lived until her death on February 2, 2013, eight days before her 101st birthday.

== See also ==
- Women in baseball
