= Nellie Twardzik =

Baseball player (b. 1919, d. 2013)

Nellie Twardzik (Thompson)
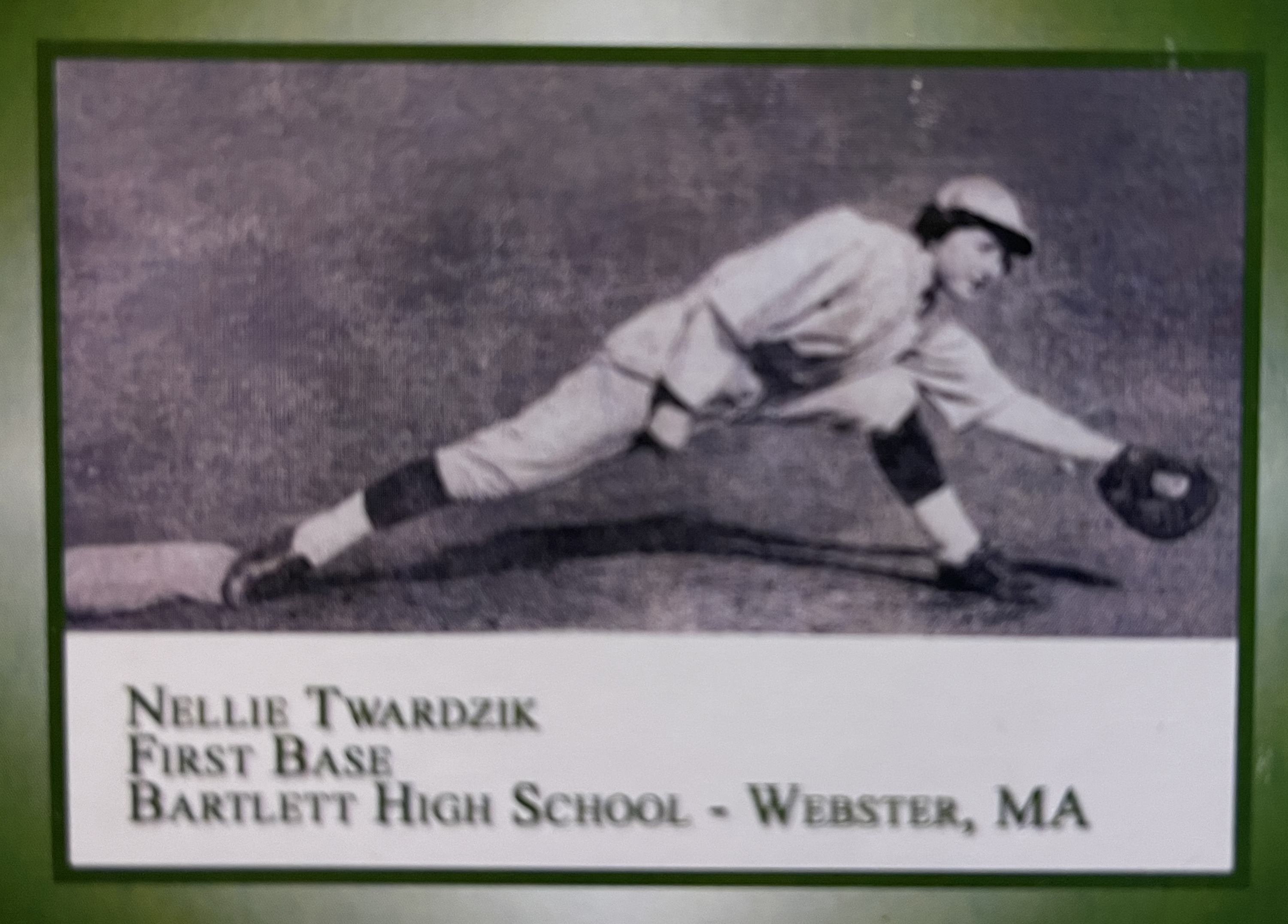
- Nellie Twardzik, 1935
- First Base
- Born: May 22, 1919; Dudley, Massachusetts, U.S.
- Died: March 8, 2013 (aged 93); Leicester, Massachusetts, U.S.
- Batted: Right Threw: Right

Aniela "Nellie" Twardzik Thompson (May 22, 1919 – March 8, 2013), at the age of 15, was the first girl to start on a high school boy's varsity baseball team in 1935. A Dudley, Massachusetts native, she played first base at Bartlett High School for three years until her graduation in 1937.

== Early years ==
Nellie was born at home in the Jericho section of Dudley, the daughter of Jacob and Anna (Wojdacz) Twardzik. She was the youngest sister of Joseph, William, Stella, Helen, Mary and Chester Twardzik. As a young girl she learned to play baseball with her older brothers, Joseph and William, who played semi-pro baseball. At age 13, Nellie played for the all male Dudley Athletic Club team. At age 14, her brother William started a semi-pro team called Nellie's All-Stars, with Nellie being the only girl on the team.

== High school ==
By the time Nellie arrived at Bartlett High School as a Sophomore, she was already an outstanding ball player. She had been playing for teams on sand lots and in open fields around Webster, Dudley and the surrounding areas for years. Nellie soon won the distinction, for which she gained national recognition, of being the first girl to start on a high school boy's varsity baseball team (April 24, 1935).

Nellie was also an honor student and served on the Student Council at Bartlett. She was a leading guard and captain on the girls’ varsity basketball team and lettered for three years. Winning her place on the boys' varsity baseball team and keeping it, however, was more challenging for a girl in 1935. It simply had never been done in America.

== School officials bar Nellie from rejoining team in 1936 ==
Jennifer Ring notes in her book Stolen Bases: Why American Girls Don't Play Baseball that during 1935, 15-year-old Nellie Twardzik gained national recognition when she beat out twenty-five boys to make the Bartlett baseball team. At the time, there were no written gender rules that applied to baseball. Although Nellie was first celebrated for winning a position on Webster's varsity team in 1935, she was blocked from trying out for the team in her second year because of her gender.

Her absence from the Bartlett team in the spring of 1936 caused a local uproar. The student body, team members and local fans marched in protest from the school to the principal's home. Baseball coach, George Finnegan, the school board and the principal later reversed the decision to bar her. Nellie was allowed back on the team.

Newspapers referred to Nellie Twardzik as the “Babe Ruth” of Webster. In April 1936 Bob Coyne of the Boston Post penned a caricature and article entitled, “Oh Boy What a Girl!” featuring Nellie's baseball skills and the challenge of keeping her on the team. All the publicity generated from the controversy created even more interest in the team and the girl on first base. It was estimated that as many as 1,500 spectators attended high school games during those years, when previously games drew two or three hundred supporters.

== The National Baseball Hall of Fame and other awards and honors ==
Nellie's scrapbooks have been enshrined in the National Baseball Hall of Fame Library in Cooperstown, New York since 1990. She was inducted into the Bartlett High School Sports Hall of Fame in 2004 and was recipient of the Stasia Czernicki Sportswoman Award in that same year. On Mother's Day, May 13, 2006, Nellie Twardzik's Bartlett High School letter and first baseman's glove were placed on permanent display in the "Diamond Dreams - Women in Baseball" exhibit at the National Baseball Hall of Fame.

At age 87, Nellie attended the exhibit's 2006 opening. She was recognized during the opening presentation by Hall of Fame Chairperson, Jane Forbes Clark.

Nellie was further honored at the Massachusetts State House in July 2006. On September 9 that year, she threw out the ceremonial first pitch at Fenway Park in a game where the Boston Red Sox played the Kansas City Royals. Though encouraged to pitch from a shorter distance, Nellie insisted on pitching from the mound. She proceeded to fire the ball across the plate.

== Later life ==
After graduating from High School, she played semi-pro ball for the Watertown Nighthawks and later for the Loreto Ball Club. Her playing days ended around 1940 when most men started to leave the baseball ranks to join the World War II effort.

Nellie, at age 50, served as assistant director of the Crawford Field summer playground in Dudley where she encouraged boys and girls to play baseball on coed teams. In the late 1960s she co-founded and co-directed the Dudley Lassie League, and also coached one of its first teams. Nellie continued to play ball in the Southbridge Women's Softball League throughout the 1970s.

== Family ==
Nellie married her high school sweetheart, James "Jim" Thompson. He attended the University of Alabama and served as a Navy pilot during World War II and the Korean Conflict. They had 5 children, Patricia, Kathleen, Mary Ellen, Joanne and Joseph. Nellie's Park, the site of the former Stevens Linen School in Dudley, was named in her honor in January 2013.
