= Ila Borders =

American baseball player (born 1975)

- Pitcher
- Born: February 18, 1975 (age 51); La Mirada, California, U.S.
- Batted: Right Threw: Left

Northern League debut
- May 31, 1997, for the St. Paul Saints

Last appearance
- 2000, for the Zion Pioneerzz
- Stats at Baseball Reference

Teams
- St. Paul Saints (1997); Duluth–Superior Dukes (1997–1999); Madison Black Wolf (1999); Zion Pioneerzz (2000)

Ila Jane Borders (born February 18, 1975) is an American former left-handed pitcher in college and independent professional baseball player. As a female pitcher in men's leagues, Borders achieved numerous baseball milestones at the college and professional levels, including being the first female pitcher to start and win a men's professional baseball game. In four seasons from 1997 to 2000, she appeared in 52 games and posted a record of 2–4 and 6.75 earned run average while recording 36 strikeouts.

== Biography ==
Borders played for Southern California College in the 1994–1996 seasons and Whittier College in the 1997 season. In 1995 she was the first woman to start as a pitcher in a men's collegiate baseball game. She was also the first woman to receive a baseball scholarship to play men's collegiate baseball and the first woman to earn a win in men's collegiate baseball. Borders was the first woman to play for The Canadian Collegiate Premier Wooden Bat League for the Swift Current Indians in the summer of 1995.

Borders became one of the first female pitchers in integrated men's professional baseball (women such as Toni Stone had played in the Negro leagues) when in 1997 she was signed by Mike Veeck of the St. Paul Saints of the independent Northern League, playing in her first regular season game on May 31, 1997 against the Sioux Falls Canaries. In that debut, she hit the first batter she faced, balked, and gave up three earned runs without recording an out. Her next appearance was much improved; in the one inning she pitched, she walked one but then struck out the side. One month into the regular season, she was traded to the Duluth–Superior Dukes. She pitched from the bullpen for both teams, seeing limited use. Her 1997 season totals were a 7.53 ERA, 15 appearances, 14 innings, allowing 24 hits and 9 walks while striking out 11 and with no decisions.

She returned to the Dukes for the 1998 season, pitching from the bullpen at first. On Thursday, July 7, 1998, she was made a starting pitcher, making her the first female pitcher to start a men's professional baseball game. The game was an 8–3 home loss to the Sioux Falls Canaries. Her line score on that night was 5 innings pitched, 3 runs allowed (all earned), 5 hits, 2 walks, and 2 strikeouts. She was credited with the loss. She made further starts, and on July 24, 1998, she became one of the first female pitchers to record a win in pro men's baseball in a 3–1 home victory against the Sioux Falls Canaries. A baseball from the game and the line-up cards were donated to the National Baseball Hall of Fame and Museum in Cooperstown, New York by home plate umpire Steve Wammer. That night she went 6 innings, giving up just 3 hits, walking 2, and striking out 2. This was the start of a streak of 12 scoreless innings that stretched into her next no-decision start vs. the Fargo-Moorhead RedHawks. Following that start, she suffered a severe bout of food poisoning that caused her to miss time, and most of the rest of her outings that season were poor. The Northern League regular season ended the first weekend in September. Her 1998 season totals were as follows: 1–4 record, 44 innings, 8.66 ERA, 65 hits, 14 walks, 14 strikeouts.

Returning to the Dukes in 1999, a new manager returned Borders to bullpen duty. They did not see eye-to-eye on her role or pitching style. In three outings for this manager, Borders had a 30.86 ERA (0–0 record, 2.3 innings, 10 hits, 4 walks, 1 strikeout). She requested a trade at this point and was sent to the Madison Black Wolf. Here she posted the best numbers of her career with a 1–0 record, 1.67 ERA, 15 games, 32.3 innings, 33 hits, 10 walks, and 8 strikeouts.

In 2000, Borders moved on to the Western Baseball League, where she played for the Zion Pioneerzz. Halfway into that season, disappointed with her performance so far that year (8.31 ERA, 5 games, 8 innings, 17 hits, 2 walks, 2 strikeouts) and with her inability in the preceding offseason to get a look from any clubs affiliated with the major leagues, she retired from baseball.

(The Duluth–Superior Dukes have moved to Kansas City, Kansas and become the Kansas City T-Bones. The Madison Black Wolf have moved to Lincoln, Nebraska to become the Lincoln Saltdogs, and the St. Paul Saints have since left the Northern League, were in the American Association for several years, and in 2021 has become the Minnesota Twins AAA Affiliate team.)

== Celebrity appearances ==
On May 14, 2004, Borders appeared on The Howard Stern Show with comedian Artie Lange during a radio show stunt in Las Vegas. Borders appeared in the Sports Illustrated magazine published on March 7, 1994, and again in Sports Illustrated for Kids. Borders also made appearances on popular syndicated shows such as The Tonight Show with Jay Leno, Today with Joe Garagiola and Good Morning America. Annie Leibovitz and Susan Sontag have Borders featured in their 1999 book Women.

== Playing style ==
Borders' style was that of a control pitcher. She attempted to throw breaking pitches and low fastballs to let the hitters get themselves out on ground balls. She could, when asked, throw a little over 80 mph, but when she did so the ball's trajectory flattened and became easier to hit. Her best pitch was a screwball. She also threw a curveball, which would break from 10 o'clock to 4 o'clock as it crossed the plate.

== Post-retirement ==
Borders worked in the Long Beach Fire Department for one and a half years before moving to Gilbert, Arizona in 2008. She was a firefighter and emergency medical technician in the Gilbert Fire Department, before becoming a firefighter-paramedic for the Cornelius Fire Department in Cornelius, Oregon. As of 2017, she lives in Beaverton, Oregon.

In 2017, her biography, Making My Pitch: A Woman's Baseball Odyssey, which she wrote with Jean Ardell, was published.

== Awards ==
Borders was elected to the Baseball Reliquary's Shrine of the Eternals for her unique contributions to the game of baseball in 2003. Borders' collegiate and professional baseball gear is on display at the National Baseball Hall of Fame and Museum.

== See also ==
- Dr. Alta Weiss – pitched for the Vermilion Independents then the Weiss All-Stars starting in 1907
- Jackie Mitchell – pitched for the Chattanooga Lookouts briefly in 1931, then later with the House of David
- Mamie Johnson – pitched for the Indianapolis Clowns in the 1953–1955 seasons
- Eri Yoshida – pitched for the Kobe 9 Cruise of the Kansai Independent Baseball League in the 2009 season and the Chico Outlaws in the independent US Golden Baseball League in the 2010 season.
- Women in baseball
