= Season ticket =

Ticket that grants privileges over a defined period of time

A season ticket or season pass is a ticket valid for multiple events, typically providing access to an entire season of games or performances at a specific venue or within a particular activity, such as sports matches or public transportation services. Season tickets are commonly issued by sports organizations, theaters, and transit authorities to ensure customers have secured access for an extended period at a discounted rate compared to purchasing individual event tickets.

While most prevalent in sports such as baseball, basketball, and soccer, season tickets are also used for music performances, theater seasons, and public transportation, where the ticket provides unlimited or pre-paid access within the specified period. Over time, the model of season ticketing has evolved, incorporating flexible ticket exchanges, digital memberships, and targeted marketing strategies to engage diverse customer segments.

== History ==
The Oxford English Dictionary has illustrative quotations which show the term season ticket used in the United States in 1820 for theatre tickets; and in the United Kingdom in 1836 for boat travel and 1862 for rail transport.

== Sports ==
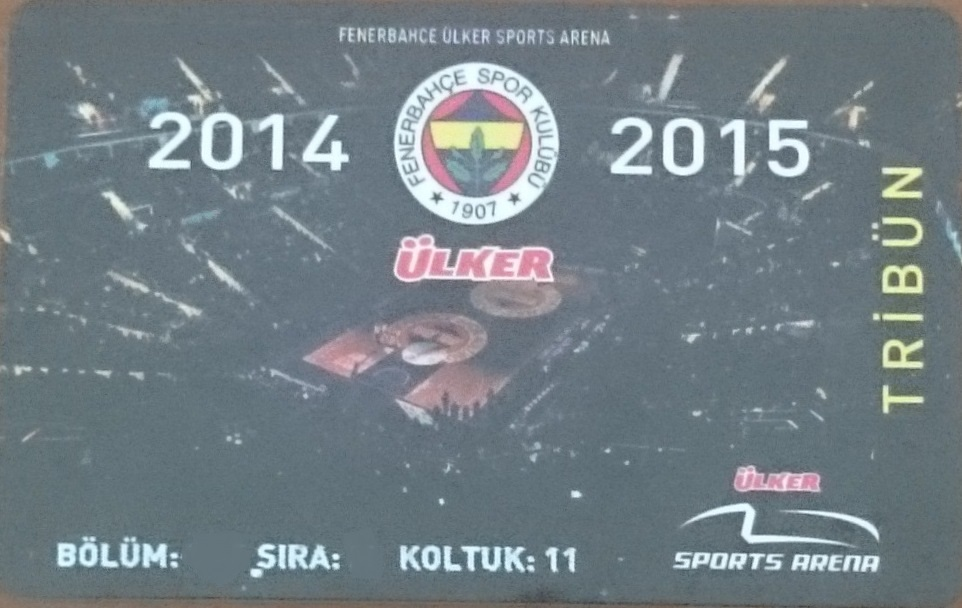
Season ticket for Turkish basketball team Fenerbahçe S.K.

In sports, a season ticket grants the holder access to all regular-season home games for one season without additional charges. The ticket usually offers a discounted price over purchasing a ticket for each of the home games for a season individually. In some sports, season ticket holders are usually allowed to buy tickets for other home games (such as the playoffs) earlier than other fans, and may be given priority when buying tickets for their team's allocation at an away game. Seats assigned to season tickets are generally the better ones in their seating section. Season ticket holders are frequently offered preferred seating at special events or extra games. Margaret Donahue came up with the idea to sell season tickets for the Chicago Cubs of Major League Baseball in 1929.

Season passes are commonly used for winter sports, but were originally in American ski resorts a privilege for club members and investors. However, in 2000 a discounting movement across the US triggered a price war and increased the widespread use of season passes.

== Arts ==
A season ticket is also an option for many music venues (including Opera, Ballet, Symphony houses) and repertory theatre companies. The season subscription usually offers a discounted price over purchasing a ticket for each concert or play in a series or all concerts or plays in a season.

== Public transport ==
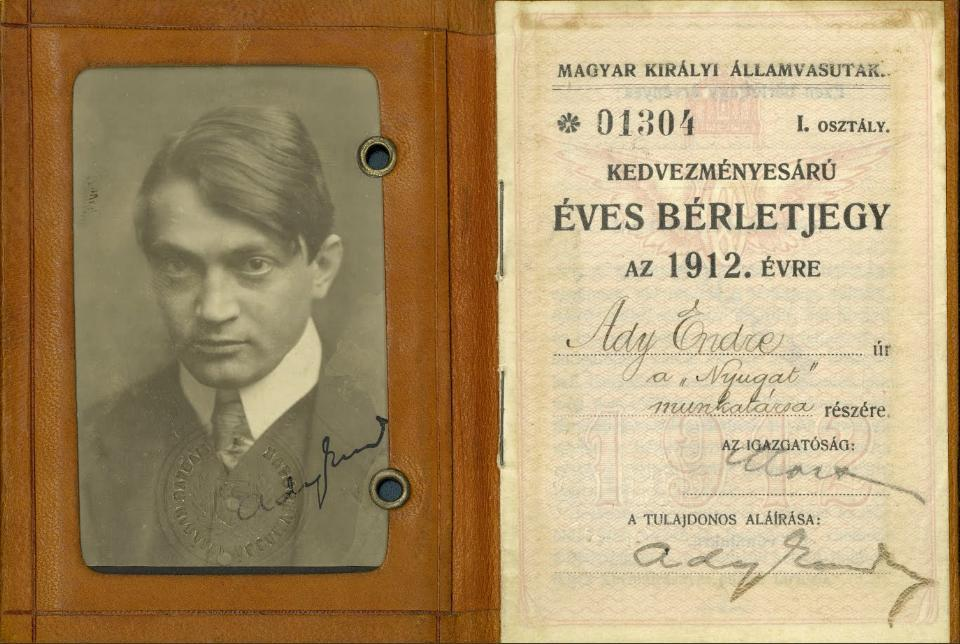
Hungarian poet Endre Ady's season rail pass from 1912

In public transport, a season ticket allows the user to travel by public transport an unlimited number of times within a period of time. The term "commuter pass" is used in some countries. Season tickets are typically sold for a week, month or year. The validity of season tickets varies. At one extreme it may only allow travel between two points (A to B) by only one operator and one route (if there are more than one competing). At the other extreme, it may allow unlimited travel within a geographic area, or even a whole country, allowing free choice of method of transportation (bus, tram, train, etc.) and free choice of operating company.

== Television ==
In television, a season ticket refers to the term invented by the manufacturers of the TiVo digital video recorder for the function which allows a user to program the device to record all the episodes of a season of a television show, even if their airings are rescheduled or pre-empted. Similar functions are available on competitive digital video recorder systems and software packages, such as ReplayTV and IceTV. With the advent of digital streaming services, such as Netflix and digital video stores like iTunes and Google Play Store, one can also purchase a season pass to gain the ability to watch every episode of a chosen season at one's leisure on a computer or mobile device.

== Video games ==
The use of battle passes as a means of video game monetization was first used within the Dota 2 esports tournament The International 2013, which provided a purchasable season pass to viewers rewarding them with in-game items for their viewership. Such battle passes gained more in free to play games following consumer and governmental backlash against loot boxes. By 2020, games like Fortnite and Apex Legends frequently used battle passes based around themed seasons and offering in-game items designed towards that theme.

== Other uses ==
Other examples of venues that often offer season passes include amusement parks, recreational sports venues (ski areas), and paid-admission parks (state and national parks). Some passes may also grant additional perks, such as free or prepaid parking, or coupons exclusive to pass-holders.

== See also ==
- Personal seat license
- Rail pass
- Battle Pass
