= Alyssa Nakken =

American baseball coach (born 1990)

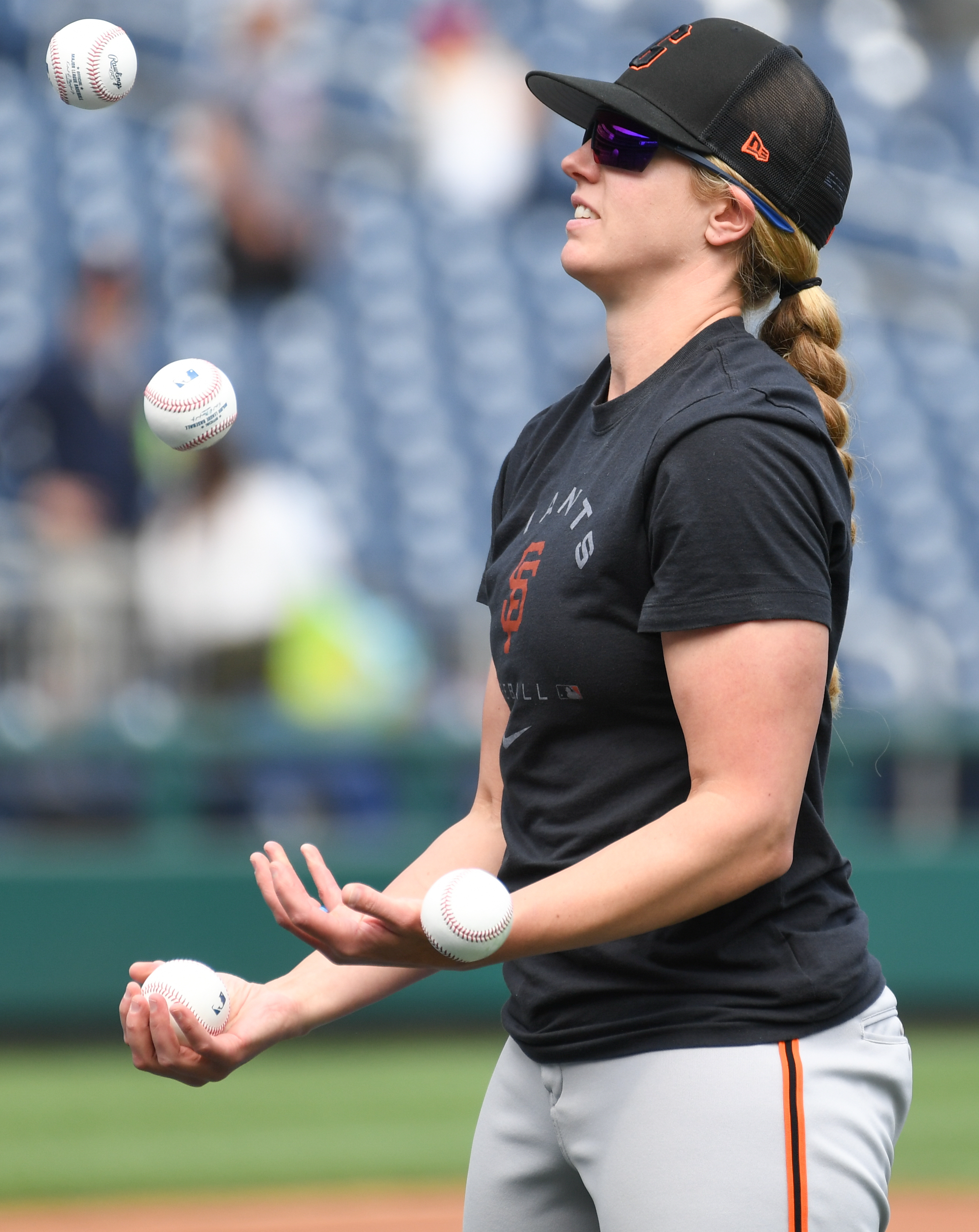
- Nakken with the San Francisco Giants in 2022

Cleveland Guardians
- Coach
- Born: June 13, 1990 (age 36); Woodland, California, U.S.
- Bats: Right Throws: Right

Teams
- As coach: San Francisco Giants (2020–2024); Cleveland Guardians (2025–present)

Alyssa Michelle Nakken (born June 13, 1990) is an American professional baseball coach for the Cleveland Guardians of Major League Baseball (MLB). She is the first female full-time coach in MLB history, and the first to coach on the field during a major league game. In 2014 she was an analytical intern for the San Francisco Giants during the postseason, winning a World Series ring. She attended California State University, Sacramento, where she played college softball.

== Early life ==
Nakken is from Woodland, California, and graduated from Woodland High School in 2008. In high school, Nakken played softball, basketball, and volleyball.

She attended California State University, Sacramento, where she played college softball for the Sacramento State Hornets as a first baseman. She had a .304 batting average and was named to the All-Pacific Coast Softball Conference all four years, from 2009 through 2012. She was also a three-time all conference selection, and the 2012 conference Scholar-Athlete of the Year. Nakken graduated with a bachelor's degree in psychology.

== Career ==
=== San Francisco Giants ===
Nakken joined the San Francisco Giants' baseball operations department as an intern in 2014. She worked for the team on health and wellness programs. In 2015, she earned a master's degree in sports management from the University of San Francisco, where she also worked as the chief information officer for the baseball team. The Giants promoted her to the major league coaching staff as an assistant coach in January 2020, making her the first full-time female coach in MLB history.

On July 20, 2020, Nakken became the first woman to coach on the field in a major league baseball game, during exhibition play. Nakken was first base coach for the Giants' game against the Oakland Athletics. The Giants won 6–2. Her jersey from the game was sent to the National Baseball Hall of Fame and Museum. Nakken continued to coach in exhibition games in 2021.

Nakken became the first woman to coach on the field in a regular season major league game on April 12, 2022, when the Giants substituted her into the game as the first base coach after Antoan Richardson was ejected during the top of the third inning of a game against the San Diego Padres.

In 2023, Nakken was interviewed for a managerial position with the San Francisco Giants, making her the first woman to interview for any managerial position with a Major League Baseball team.

=== Cleveland Guardians ===
On November 23, 2024, Nakken joined the Cleveland Guardians as an assistant director for player development.

== Personal life ==
Nakken is married to Robert Abel, who is also a coach at a baseball school that he founded in 2019. Their first child was born January 2024, when Nakken became the first MLB coach to take maternity leave.

== See also ==
- Women in baseball
