= Lizzie Arlington =

American baseball player

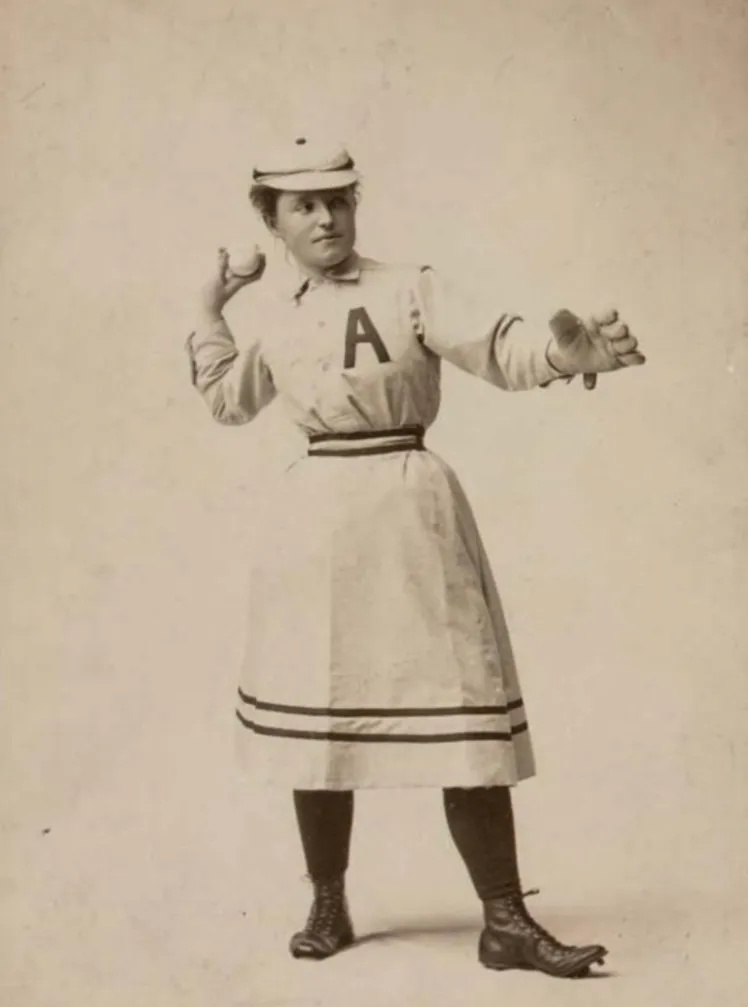
- Born: Elizabeth Stride; August 31, 1876; Pennsylvania, U.S.
- Died: March 1919 (aged 42); Philadelphia, Pennsylvania, U.S.

Elizabeth Stride Warner (August 31, 1876 – March 14, 1919), known professionally as Lizzie Arlington, was an American baseball player. She was the first woman to play for a professional men's baseball team.

== Early life ==
Arlington was the youngest of six children born to emigrants Henry and Mary Stride, from Wales. She grew up in Mahanoy City, Pennsylvania, where she played baseball with her father and brothers.

On June 20, 1891, at age 13, Arlington took the field as the pitcher for the Mahanoy City baseball team against the visiting Cincinnati Reds (a professional women's team barnstorming through the area). Reds' manager Mark Lally, impressed with her play, immediately recruited and signed her to play for his team. Arlington played three seasons with the Reds, including two where she shared pitching duties with Maud Nelson.

Arlington played for the Young Ladies Baseball Club of New York in 1894 and the other Young Ladies Baseball Club of New York (also known as the New York Stars) in 1895.

== Minor League Baseball (1898) ==
In 1898, sporting and theatrical promoter William J. Connor engaged Arlington for $100.00 a week and negotiated with Atlantic League president Edward G. Barrow for her to sign a minor league contract. She showed up later that year while pitching for the reserve team of the Philadelphia Nationals, and continued to pitch and play infield against several professional clubs in exhibition games around the country throughout the summer.

On July 5, 1898, Arlington became the first woman to play for a professional men's baseball team when she pitched the ninth inning for the Reading Coal Heavers against the Allentown Peanuts. Reading was leading 5–0 heading into the final inning when Arlington entered the game. Though she allowed two hits and walked a batter to load the bases, Arlington succeeded in retiring the next three batters to preserve the victory, as the crowd enthusiastically shouted "Good for Lizzie!"

The Reading Eagle newspaper reported that more than a thousand fans, including 200 women, attended the game to see what Arlington looked like and what she wore. She entered the grounds in a "stylish carriage drawn by two white horses" and, responding to applause by lifting her cap, revealed her hair done in the latest fashion. She wore black stockings and a gray uniform with knee-length skirt. During the pre-game practice, Arlington played second base like a professional, "even down to expectorating on her hands and wiping them on her uniform", according to the report.

The verdict of the Eagle's sports writer was that, "for a woman, she is a success." A writer for the Hartford Courant, anticipating her coming to play for the locals against the Newark team, commented, "It is said that she plays ball like a man and talks ball like a man and if it was not for her bloomers she would be taken for a man on the diamond, having none of the peculiarities of women ball players." But authorities cancelled the appearance of Arlington in Hartford, reportedly because the home team management wanted to take no chances on losing the game, and thereafter her name disappeared from the sports pages.

== Later life ==
In 1901, she married George Warner. Both had been former residents of Mahanoy City, Pennsylvania. After leaving baseball, she continued to play tennis, and according to her obituary, she frequently attended local baseball games. After her husband's death on January 25, 1911, she embarked upon a business career. She died in Philadelphia in 1919.
