= Carey Schueler =

First woman drafted by MLB in the US

- Pitcher
- Born: April 25, 1975 (age 51); Philadelphia, Pennsylvania, U.S.
- Bats: Right Throws: Left
- Stats at Baseball Reference

Carey A. Schueler (born April 25, 1975) is the first woman ever drafted by a Major League Baseball (MLB) team.

== Drafting by the White Sox ==
Schueler played baseball at Campolindo High School in Moraga, California as a left-handed pitcher. In 1993, Schueler became the first woman to be drafted by an MLB team when the Chicago White Sox (whose general manager at the time, Ron Schueler, was her father) picked her directly out of high school in the 43rd round (1208th pick overall) of the 1993 MLB draft. Prior to Schueler's drafting, the MLB had a ban in place on signing contracts for women; the rescindment of the rule in 1992 allowed the White Sox to draft her.

At the time of her drafting, Schueler was also a basketball star for her high school's basketball team. She did not sign with the White Sox, and instead attended and played basketball for DePaul University in Chicago, Illinois before transferring to St. Mary's College of California, in Moraga, where she continued to play until an injury in 1996.

== Career statistics ==
=== College ===
| Year | Team | GP | GS | MPG | FG% | 3P% | FT% | RPG | APG | SPG | BPG | TO | PPG |
|---|---|---|---|---|---|---|---|---|---|---|---|---|---|
| 1993–94 | DePaul | 30 | - | - | 40.4 | 40.3 | 79.5 | 3.9 | 3.1 | 0.8 | 0.4 | - | 10.8 |
| 1994–95 | DePaul | 28 | - | - | 43.9 | 40.0 | 75.9 | 2.1 | 2.3 | 1.0 | 0.2 | - | 7.4 |
| Career | | 58 | - | - | 41.7 | 40.2 | 78.0 | 3.1 | 2.7 | 0.9 | 0.3 | - | 9.2 |
Statistics retrieved from Sports-Reference.

== Personal life ==
Schueler is the daughter of Ron Schueler, a former professional pitcher, pitching coach, general manager and scout. She is married to Kate Varde, with whom she has a son, Schueler, and a daughter, Grace.

== See also ==
- Women in baseball
