= Kathryn Johnston Massar =

Kathryn "Tubby" Johnston Massar was the first woman to play in a Little League Baseball game, in 1950. She joined, disguised as a boy, and used the name Tubby Johnston. Later she was known to be a girl and was still allowed to play. Johnston was from Corning, New York, and played first base for the King's Dairy team.

== Tubby's Rule ==
When the season had ended, a Little League meeting was held. It was decided that girls would be banned from Little League Baseball, which was known as Tubby's Rule. Later, in 1974, due to a lawsuit brought on behalf of Maria Pepe by the National Organization for Women, the New Jersey Superior Court decided that Little League Baseball must allow girls to play. In the final week of December 1974, President Gerald Ford signed a bill that opened Little League Baseball to girls.
