= Maud Nelson =

American female baseball player (1881–1944)

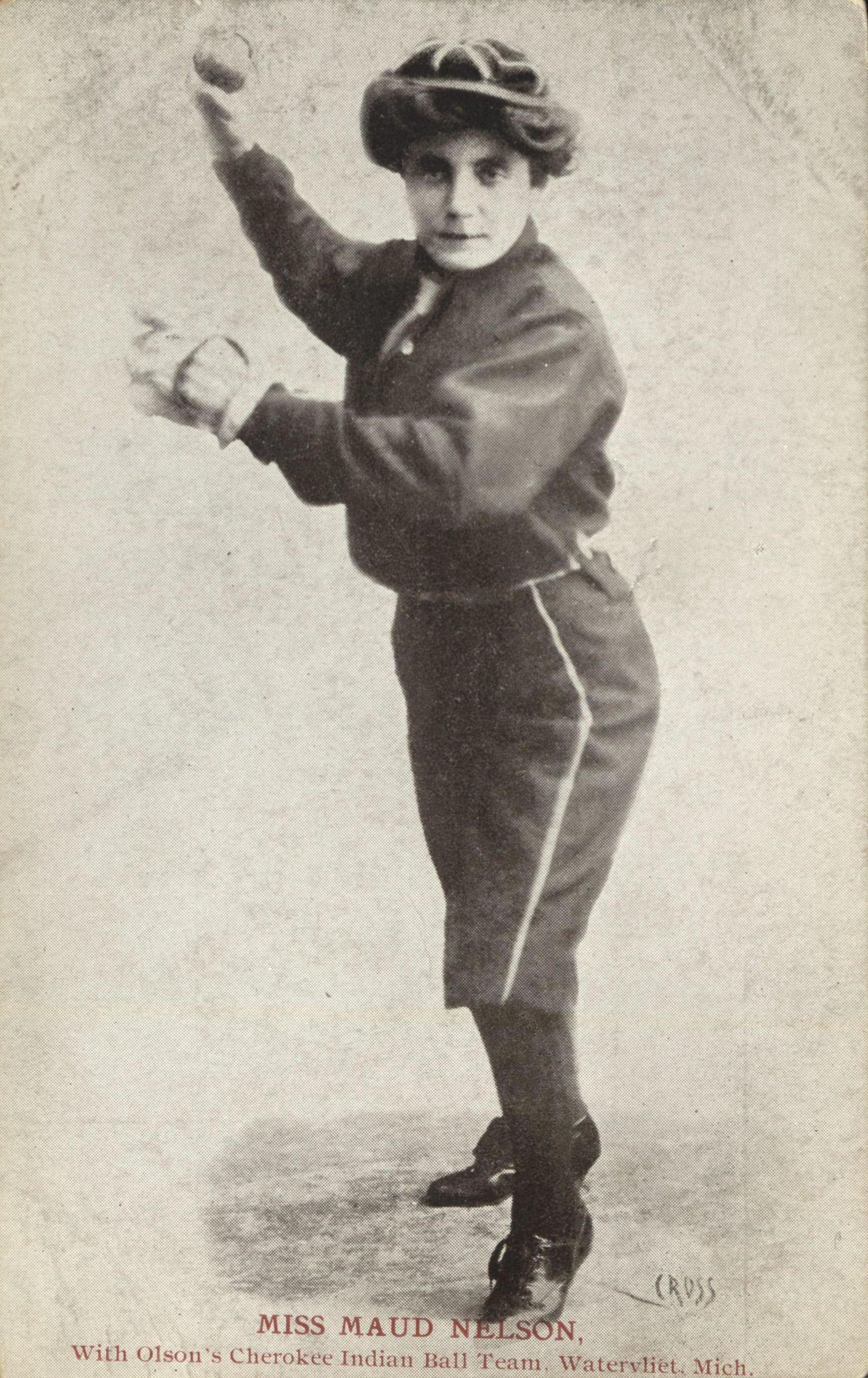
- in "Olsen's Cherokee Indian Base Ball Club"
- Born: Clementina Brida; June 27, 1872; Caldes (TN) Italy
- Died: February 15, 1944 (aged 71); Chicago, Illinois, U.S.
- Occupations: Baseball player, coach, team owner
- Spouse: Joe Olsen

Maud Nelson (born Clementina Brida, June 27, 1872 - February 15, 1944) was an early Italian-born American professional woman baseball pitcher, scout, manager, and team owner.

== Life ==
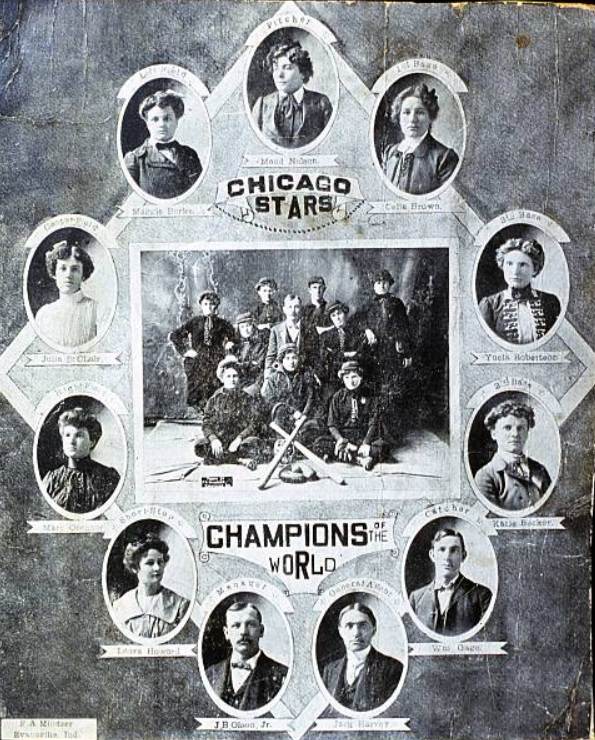
Baseball pitcher Maud Nelson and the Chicago Stars c.1902

Nelson began pitching professionally at the age of 16, as a starting pitcher for the Boston Bloomer Girls. She played for several professional baseball teams, including the American Athletic Girls. She was a leading player of the Chicago Stars who were billed as "Champions of the World". She was their star pitcher during 1902 and 1903 when the team would tour by Pullman coach. In addition to her starting pitching duties, she often played third base in the later innings of a game. Other skilful players in the Chicago team was Julie St Clair and Maggie Burke.

In 1905 John B (Joe) Olsen and Nelson moved to Watervliet, Michigan where they established a new women's baseball team. The "Cherokee Indian Base Ball Team" set out in their Pullman car in the same year complete with an electric light facility, a grand stand and a 12 foot by 1200 foot fence. Nelson despite being born in Caldes Tyrol now Italy was on the team. She was billed by her husband, Olsen, as the undisputed women's champion pitcher of the world.

In 1911, Maud Nelson became owner-manager of the Western Bloomer Girls, along with her first husband, Olsen. The "Bloomer Girl" style was well known with an easier game and the bloomer style of dress was strongly associated with women's baseball. She also became a baseball scout in 1911, recruiting both male and female players for a number of professional teams. After John died in 1917, Maud again played for Boston, and managed a women's team for the Chicago Athletic Club.

In the early 1920s, Maud married Costante Dellacqua, with whom she later started the All Star Ranger Girls team. The team wore cowboys hats, skirts, shirts and cardigans with the initials A and R on the sleeve. In 1934 she signed future star Rose Gacioch to her team. This was towards the end of the Bloomer Girls teams as softball became the more popular game. Nelson retired to a house in the neighborhood of Wrigley Field, living there until her death in 1944. In 2001, Nelson became part of the National Italian American Sports Hall of Fame as a posthumous inductee.

== See also ==
- Women in baseball

== Sources ==
- Gregorich, Barbara (1993). Women at Play: The Story of Women in Baseball. Harcourt Brace and Company. pp. 6–11.
- "The Girls of Summer".
