= Georgia Bulldogs baseball statistical leaders =

The Georgia Bulldogs baseball statistical leaders are individual statistical leaders of the Georgia Bulldogs baseball program in various categories, including batting average, home runs, runs batted in, runs, hits, stolen bases, ERA, and Strikeouts. Within those areas, the lists identify single-game, single-season, and career leaders. The Bulldogs represent the University of Georgia in the NCAA's Southeastern Conference.

Georgia began competing in intercollegiate baseball in 1886. These lists are updated through the end of the 2026 season.

== Batting Average ==
Career Min. of 300 AB
| Rk | Player | AVG | Seasons |
|---|---|---|---|
| 1 | Charlie Condon | .410 | 2023 2024 |
| 2 | Joe Stewart | .394 | 1977 1978 1979 |
| 3 | David Lanning | .382 | 1977 1978 1979 |
| | Rodney Bellamy | .382 | 1979 1980 |
| 5 | Jeff Treadway | .381 | 1982 1983 |
| 6 | Jeff Keppinger | .380 | 1999 2000 2001 |
| 7 | Billy Henderson | .375 | 1947 1948 1949 1950 |
| 8 | Marty Brown | .360 | 1984 1985 |
| 9 | Buck Belue | .356 | 1979 1980 1981 1982 |
| 10 | Rich Poythress | .353 | 2007 2008 2009 |
| | Mike Wirth | .353 | 1981 1982 |

Season
| Rk | Player | AVG | Season |
|---|---|---|---|
| 1 | Ronnie Braddock | .489 | 1962 |
| 2 | Charley Trippi | .464 | 1946 |
| 3 | Buck Belue | .447 | 1982 |
| 4 | Joe Stewart | .438 | 1978 |
| 5 | Charlie Condon | .433 | 2024 |
| 6 | Wendall Tarleton | .424 | 1955 |
| 7 | R.E. Gladin | .420 | 1958 |
| 8 | Rodney Bellamy | .415 | 1980 |
| 9 | Gordon Beckham | .411 | 2008 |
| | Rick Fuentes | .411 | 1982 |

== Home Runs ==
Career
| Rk | Player | HR | Seasons |
|---|---|---|---|
| 1 | Charlie Condon | 62 | 2023 2024 |
| 2 | Gordon Beckham | 53 | 2006 2007 2008 |
| 3 | Josh Morris | 51 | 2004 2005 2006 |
| 4 | Kolby Branch | 50 | 2024 2025 2026 |
| 5 | Daniel Jackson | 46 | 2025 2026 |
| 6 | Corey Collins | 45 | 2021 2022 2023 2024 |
| | Doc Brooks | 45 | 1999 2000 2001 |
| | Roger Miller | 45 | 1986 1987 1988 1989 |
| 9 | Connor Tate | 43 | 2019 2020 2021 2022 2023 |
| | Rich Poythress | 43 | 2007 2008 2009 |

Season
| Rk | Player | HR | Season |
|---|---|---|---|
| 1 | Charlie Condon | 37 | 2024 |
| 2 | Daniel Jackson | 32 | 2026 |
| 3 | Gordon Beckham | 28 | 2008 |
| 4 | Charlie Condon | 25 | 2023 |
| | Rich Poythress | 25 | 2009 |
| 6 | Josh Morris | 23 | 2006 |
| | Andy Osbolt | 23 | 1998 |
| 8 | Brennan Hudson | 22 | 2026 |
| 9 | Kolby Branch | 20 | 2026 |
| | Michael O'Shaughnessy | 20 | 2026 |
| | Robbie Burnett | 20 | 2025 |
| | Corey Collins | 20 | 2024 |
| | Ron Wenrich | 20 | 1985 |

Single Game
| Rk | Player | HR | Season | Opponent |
|---|---|---|---|---|
| 1 | 13 times | 3 | Most recent: Daniel Jackson, 2026 vs. Arkansas | |

== Runs Batted In ==
Career
| Rk | Player | RBI | Seasons |
|---|---|---|---|
| 1 | Roger Miller | 226 | 1986 1987 1988 1989 |
| 2 | Rich Poythress | 185 | 2007 2008 2009 |
| 3 | Josh Morris | 184 | 2004 2005 2006 |
| 4 | Gordon Beckham | 182 | 2006 2007 2008 |
| 5 | Connor Tate | 169 | 2019 2020 2021 2022 2023 |
| 6 | Kyle Farmer | 168 | 2010 2011 2012 2013 |
| | Jeff Keppinger | 168 | 1999 2000 2001 |
| 8 | Adam Swann | 167 | 1999 2000 2001 2002 |
| 9 | Mark Thornhill | 166 | 1998 1999 2000 2001 |
| 10 | Chris Stowers | 159 | 1993 1994 1995 1996 |
| | Kolby Branch | 159 | 2024 2025 2026 |

Season
| Rk | Player | RBI | Season |
|---|---|---|---|
| 1 | Daniel Jackson | 87 | 2026 |
| 2 | Rich Poythress | 86 | 2009 |
| 3 | Charlie Condon | 78 | 2024 |
| 4 | Gordon Beckham | 77 | 2008 |
| 5 | Rich Poythress | 75 | 2008 |
| 6 | J.R. Showalter | 74 | 1990 |
| 7 | Jeff Keppinger | 73 | 2001 |
| 8 | Josh Morris | 71 | 2004 |
| 9 | Ron Wenrich | 70 | 1985 |
| 10 | Slate Alford | 69 | 2024 |

Single Game
| Rk | Player | RBI | Season | Opponent |
|---|---|---|---|---|
| 1 | Roger Miller | 10 | 1987 | Ga. College |

== Runs ==
Career
| Rk | Player | R | Seasons |
|---|---|---|---|
| 1 | Doug Radziewicz | 207 | 1988 1989 1990 1991 |
| 2 | Gordon Beckham | 201 | 2006 2007 2008 |
| 3 | Roger Miller | 180 | 1986 1987 1988 1989 |
| 4 | Todd Crane | 179 | 1992 1993 1994 1995 |
| 5 | Jeff Keppinger | 178 | 1999 2000 2001 |
| | J.R. Showalter | 178 | 1988 1989 1990 |
| 7 | Ryan Peisel | 169 | 2006 2007 2008 |
| 8 | Tre Phelps | 160 | 2024 2025 2026 |
| | Connor Tate | 160 | 2019 2020 2021 2022 2023 |
| | Adam Swann | 160 | 1999 2000 2001 2002 |

Season
| Rk | Player | R | Season |
|---|---|---|---|
| 1 | Gordon Beckham | 97 | 2008 |
| 2 | Daniel Jackson | 88 | 2026 |
| 3 | Charlie Condon | 84 | 2024 |
| 4 | Tre Phelps | 81 | 2026 |
| 5 | Ryan Peisel | 78 | 2008 |
| 6 | J.R. Showalter | 75 | 1990 |
| 7 | Scott Bohlke | 72 | 1987 |
| 8 | Slate Alford | 71 | 2025 |
| | Andy Neufeld | 71 | 2001 |
| | Jeff Cooper | 71 | 1990 |

Single Game
| Rk | Player | R | Season | Opponent |
|---|---|---|---|---|
| 1 | David Jackson | 6 | 1982 | Tenn.-Temple |

== Hits ==
Career
| Rk | Player | H | Seasons |
|---|---|---|---|
| 1 | Doug Radziewicz | 282 | 1988 1989 1990 1991 |
| | Roger Miller | 282 | 1986 1987 1988 1989 |
| 3 | Mark Thornhill | 276 | 1998 1999 2000 2001 |
| 4 | Jeff Keppinger | 271 | 1999 2000 2001 |
| 5 | Kyle Farmer | 265 | 2010 2011 2012 2013 |
| 6 | Gordon Beckham | 263 | 2006 2007 2008 |
| 7 | Ryan Peisel | 261 | 2006 2007 2008 |
| | J.R. Showalter | 261 | 1988 1989 1990 |
| 9 | Pete Arenas | 258 | 1993 1994 1995 1996 |
| 10 | Connor Tate | 254 | 2019 2020 2021 2022 2023 |
| | Adam Swann | 254 | 1999 2000 2001 2002 |

Season
| Rk | Player | H | Season |
|---|---|---|---|
| 1 | Gordon Beckham | 113 | 2008 |
| 2 | Joey Side | 111 | 2006 |
| 3 | Chaz Lytle | 108 | 2002 |
| 4 | Ryan Peisel | 106 | 2008 |
| 5 | Jeff Keppinger | 102 | 2001 |
| 6 | Charlie Condon | 100 | 2024 |
| | Daniel Jackson | 100 | 2026 |
| 8 | Rich Poythress | 99 | 2008 |
| 9 | Jonathan Wyatt | 96 | 2006 |
| | Andy Neufeld | 96 | 2001 |

Single Game
| Rk | Player | H | Season | Opponent |
|---|---|---|---|---|
| 1 | 2 times | 6 | Most recent: David Coffey, 2003 vs. Gardner-Webb | |

== Stolen Bases ==
Career
| Rk | Player | SB | Seasons |
|---|---|---|---|
| 1 | Billy Henderson | 91 | 1947 1948 1949 1950 |
| 2 | Wendall Tarleton | 73 | 1954 1955 1956 1957 |
| 3 | Chris Stowers | 65 | 1993 1994 1995 1996 |
| | Todd Crane | 65 | 1992 1993 1994 1995 |
| 5 | Stephen Wrenn | 56 | 2014 2015 2016 |
| 6 | Dustin McNally | 49 | 1997 1998 1999 |
| 7 | Peter Verdin | 47 | 2009 2010 2011 2012 |
| 8 | Jonathan Wyatt | 42 | 2004 2005 2006 2007 |
| 9 | Daniel Jackson | 38 | 2025 2026 |
| 10 | Tucker Maxwell | 37 | 2017 2018 2019 |

Season
| Rk | Player | SB | Season |
|---|---|---|---|
| 1 | Chaz Lytle | 31 | 2002 |
| 2 | Rodney Bellamy | 30 | 1980 |
| 3 | Billy Henderson | 29 | 1950 |
| 4 | Stephen Wrenn | 28 | 2015 |
| 5 | Wendall Tarleton | 27 | 1955 |
| | Charley Trippi | 27 | 1946 |
| 7 | Daniel Jackson | 26 | 2026 |
| 8 | Chris Stowers | 24 | 1996 |
| 9 | Johnathan Taylor | 23 | 2009 |
| 10 | Todd Crane | 22 | 1995 |
| | Wendall Tarleton | 22 | 1957 |

Single Game
| Rk | Player | SB | Season | Opponent |
|---|---|---|---|---|
| 1 | Robbie Burnett | 4 | 2025 | Quinnipiac |
| | Mason LaPlante | 4 | 2023 | Tennessee |
| | Tucker Maxwell | 4 | 2019 | Presbyterian |
| | Tucker Maxwell | 4 | 2019 | Ala. St. |

== Earned Run Average ==
Career (Min. of 95 IP)
| Rk | Player | ERA | Seasons |
|---|---|---|---|
| 1 | Chuck Fore | 2.12 | 1976 1977 |
| 2 | Buddy Copeland | 2.35 | 1967 1968 |
| 3 | Bobby Cannon | 2.39 | 1969 1970 |
| 4 | Tom Jordan | 2.43 | 1965 1966 |
| 5 | Wayne Minshew | 2.50 | 1957 1958 |
| 6 | Cris Carpenter | 2.93 | 1985 1986 1987 |
| 7 | Dennis Chastain | 3.08 | 1984 |
| | Wayne LaHullier | 3.08 | 1973 1974 1975 1976 |
| 9 | Dave Fleming | 3.10 | 1988 1989 1990 |
| 10 | Will Startup | 3.15 | 2003 2004 2005 |

Season (Min. of 1 IP/G)
| Rk | Player | ERA | Season |
|---|---|---|---|
| 1 | Wayne Minshew | 1.02 | 1957 |
| 2 | Walter Glenn | 1.32 | 1958 |
| 3 | Tom Jordan | 1.57 | 1966 |
| 4 | Chuck Fore | 1.67 | 1977 |
| 5 | Bill Ivie | 1.83 | 1975 |
| 6 | Bob Cannon | 1.94 | 1970 |
| 7 | Emerson Hancock | 1.99 | 2019 |
| 8 | Dave Fleming | 2.08 | 1989 |
| 9 | Chris DiLorenzo | 2.18 | 1974 |
| 10 | Will Startup | 2.22 | 2004 |
| | Bob Cain | 2.22 | 1964 |

== Strikeouts ==
Career
| Rk | Player | K | Seasons |
|---|---|---|---|
| 1 | Derek Lilliquist | 387 | 1985 1986 1987 |
| 2 | Brian Powell | 352 | 1993 1994 1995 |
| 3 | Dave Fleming | 318 | 1988 1989 1990 |
| 4 | Zack Frachiseur | 307 | 1996 1997 1998 |
| 5 | Josh Gandy | 286 | 1995 1996 1997 |
| 6 | John Hill | 277 | 1991 1992 1993 1994 |
| 7 | Cris Carpenter | 260 | 1985 1986 1987 |
| 8 | Michael Palazzone | 240 | 2009 2010 2011 2012 |
| 9 | Sean Ruthven | 226 | 2003 2004 2005 |
| 10 | Trevor Holder | 223 | 2006 2007 2008 2009 |

Season
| Rk | Player | K | Season |
|---|---|---|---|
| 1 | Derek Lilliquist | 190 | 1987 |
| 2 | Dave Fleming | 163 | 1990 |
| 3 | Brian Powell | 140 | 1994 |
| 4 | Brian Powell | 138 | 1995 |
| 5 | Josh Gandy | 126 | 1997 |
| 6 | Brooks Browns | 123 | 2006 |
| 7 | Zack Frachiseur | 120 | 1998 |
| 8 | Joey Volchko | 119 | 2026 |
| 9 | Chris Ciaccio | 117 | 1994 |
| 10 | Dave Fleming | 110 | 1989 |
| | Caden Aoki | 110 | 2026 |

Single Game
| Rk | Player | K | Season | Opponent |
|---|---|---|---|---|
| 1 | Jim Redfearn | 21 | 1908 | Alabama |
