= David Jackson =

David Jackson or Dave Jackson may refer to:

== Academics ==
- David Jackson (art historian) (born 1958), British professor of Russian and Scandinavian art histories
- David J. Jackson, American political scientist
- David M. Jackson, Canadian mathematics professor

== Arts and entertainment ==
- David Noyes Jackson (1922–2001), American writer, collaborator of James Merrill
- David Jackson (actor) (1934–2005), British actor
- David Jackson (musician) (born 1947), English musician and former member of the band Van der Graaf Generator
- David Jackson (director) (active since 1983), American television director and writer
- David Jackson (comics), American comic-book letterer and artist of Warrior

== Politics and law ==
- David S. Jackson (1813–1872), American politician, U.S. Representative from New York
- David Jackson (Manitoba politician) (1852–1925), Canadian politician in Manitoba
- David Jackson (Australian politician) (1889–1941), member of the Australian House of Representatives
- David Francis Jackson (fl. 1985–1987), Australian jurist on List of judges of the Federal Court of Australia
- David Jackson (judge), Australian jurist, judge in the Supreme Court of Queensland
- David D. Jackson (born 1946), Kansas state legislator

== Sports ==
=== Boxing ===
- David Jackson (Ugandan boxer) (born 1949), Ugandan boxer
- David Jackson (New Zealand boxer) (1955–2004), New Zealand boxer
- David Jackson (American boxer) (born 1976), American Olympic boxer

=== Other sports ===
- David Jackson (footballer, born 1937) (1937–2024), English footballer
- David Jackson (cricketer) (born 1953), English cricketer
- David Jackson (footballer, born 1958) (1958–2009), English footballer
- David Jackson (golfer) (born 1964), American professional golfer
- Dave Jackson (ice hockey) (born c. 1964), Canadian National Hockey League referee
- David Jackson (American football) (born 1965), American football player
- David Jackson (basketball, born 1982), American basketball player in Novo Basquete Brasil and Liga Sudamericana de Básquetbol
- Paddy Jackson (David Patrick Lindsay James Jackson, born 1992), Irish rugby player
- David Jackson (archer) (born 1992), French barebow archer

== Others ==
- David Jackson (Pennsylvania physician) (1747–1801), American physician, delegate to Continental Congress for Pennsylvania
- David Edward Jackson (1788–1837), American explorer, frontiersman, and trapper
- D. Hamilton Jackson (1884–1946), civil rights leader, resident of the United States Virgin Islands
- Oliver David Jackson (1919–2004), Australian Army officer
