= Senator Petty =

Senator Petty may refer to:

- Eric D. Petty (born 1954), Minnesota State Senate
- Jim Petty (fl. 2020s), Arkansas State Senate
- Marge Petty (born 1946), Kansas State Senate
