= Jeanne Hoferer =

American politician

Member of the Kansas Senate from the 18th district
- In office June 1, 1984 – 1988
- Preceded by: Elwaine Pomeroy
- Succeeded by: Marge Petty

Personal details
- Born: April 23, 1948 (age 78) Kansas City, Missouri
- Party: Republican
- Spouse: Paul
- Children: 2
- Education: Washburn University (B.A. in Economics)

Jeanne Hoferer (born April 23, 1948) is an American former politician who served in the Kansas State Senate from 1984 to 1988.

Hoferer was raised in Kansas City, Missouri, and attended Roman Catholic schools as a child. She attended Washburn University before dropping out to marry her husband Paul, eventually returning to earn her B.A. in 1980. Before entering politics herself, she worked for U.S. Senator Nancy Kassebaum's office.

On June 1, 1984, Hoferer was appointed to fill the Senate seat left open by Elwaine Pomeroy, who resigned his seat to serve on the Kansas parole board. She almost immediately faced an election, running against Vic Miller, a state representative from the area; Hoferer defeated him in the general election in November, thereby winning a full term in the Senate in her own right.

During her time in the Senate, Hoferer passed an amendment regulating pet sellers that were commonly described as "puppy mills". Hoferer pursued avenues to expand pull-tab gambling under Kansas bingo statutes without submitting the change to a constitutional amendment or voter approval. The Kansas Attorney General rejected the interpretation, stating that authorizing such gambling without a public referendum would be unconstitutional. She ran for re-election in 1988, but lost to Democrat Marge Petty.
