= Brunkow =

Brunkow is a surname. Notable people with the surname include:

- Kristen Brunkow O'Shea (born 1992), American politician
- Mary E. Brunkow (born 1961), American molecular biologist, immunologist and Nobel laureate
