= North American Women's Baseball League =

Amateur baseball league (2003-2009)

The North American Women's Baseball League (NAWBL) was an amateur baseball league that played from 2003 to 2009.

The NAWBL played games scheduled for seven innings, using NCAA rules, including base-stealing and taking leads off bases. Lineup rules allowed liberal substitutions and unlimited re-entry into games, and all players were guaranteed some playing time in each game. The season ran from June through August. Robin Wallace was the organizer and Executive Director, and Al Melanson was the Commissioner.

Players varied in age from high-school freshman to early forties. Some traveled from as far as Connecticut or central New Hampshire. Several players made boys' or men's teams at school. The league was competitive but friendly; arguments with umpires and with opponents were unheard-of. Selected players organized outside the regulation season and entered tournaments; they competed throughout the United States and in Canada, the Dominican Republic, and Japan.

Quality of play was variable, as the league existed not just for good players who have no other outlet to play baseball but to train new players. Ground outs were executed crisply and double plays were routine. Base running was excellent and was often drilled during the year. But a team could have an outfielder who didn't know where a fly ball would land and was coached into position. Starting pitching was a specialty rather than a shared duty, and several players became dominant as starters. Control was intermittent and a NAWBL rule adopted in 2008 required a pitcher who issued five walks in an inning to be replaced.

The squads, named Outlaws (red/black), Ravens (gold/navy), Saints (green), and Seahawks (turquoise) were chosen at the start of the year for parity. Trades between teams during a season almost never happened. The teams were run by the league; although some attracted their own fans and chart-keepers, they didn't promote themselves separately. The league did a minimum of self-promotion. They played day and evening games, with lights, the scoreboard, and an announcer.

== History ==
A predecessor New England Women's Baseball League was a player-run and-funded organization that played at many fields in the metro Boston area. This was the New England Division of a league that also had an Ontario Division and a Florida Division.

The later NAWBL, with only the New England Division, resumed under Nick Lopardo, owner of the North Shore Spirit of the independent Can-Am League. The NAWBL operated from 2003 through 2005 within the Spirit organization and played its games on Spirit off-days at Fraser Field in Lynn, Massachusetts. The NAWBL all-stars were known as the Lady Spirit. In 2004, the Lady Spirit won a 4-game series against the Dominican national team; head coach Ken Perrone said the series drew close to 4,000 attendees at one game.

In 2006 and 2007, the NAWBL was based at Holman Stadium in Nashua, New Hampshire, with the financial backing of John Stabile, owner of the Nashua Pride, also of the Can-Am League. The all-stars traveled as the Pride Pioneers.

In 2008, the NAWBL was funded by player dues and conducted a three-team season independent of any professional club. It moved back to Fraser Field, and played some games at World Series Park in Saugus, Massachusetts. In 2009, only a single game was played; on June 28 at Fraser Field, the Ravens led the Saints, 8-0, after four innings and held on to win, 11-10. The league has played no games since then, and websites at nawbl.com and nawbl.org are both inoperative.

== See also ==
- Women's baseball
- American Women's Baseball Federation
