= Women's baseball =

Sport

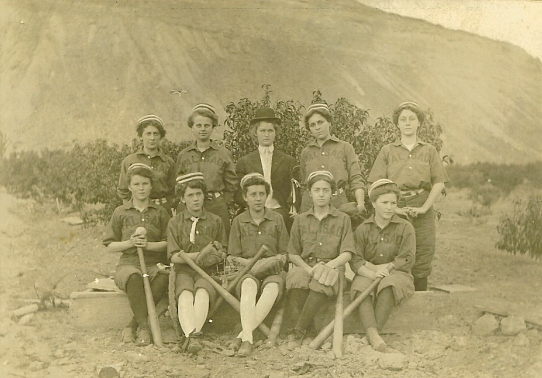
Palisade, Colorado, women's baseball team, about 1910

Women's baseball is the team sport of baseball played by women. Women have played baseball since at least 1866, when teams were formed at Vassar College. One of the first professional baseball teams were the Dolly Vardens, an African-American women's team formed in Philadelphia in 1867. Today, women's baseball is played in youth through adult leagues, and at the university level in North America and internationally.

Women's baseball is played in several countries. The strongest and most organized women's baseball leagues are in the United States, Australia, Japan, Taiwan, Cuba, Hong Kong, and Canada. Those countries have national governing bodies that support girls' and women's baseball programs. Other countries/regions that currently have organized women's baseball are Germany, France, Netherlands, Croatia, India, South Korea, Venezuela, Argentina, Puerto Rico, Colombia, Brazil, Dominican Republic, and Pakistan. There also are a handful of women playing baseball in Vietnam currently on the Fishanu team at Hanoi University and on the Hanoi Baseball Club.

Internationally, the World Baseball Softball Confederation is the world governing body for women's and men's baseball, as well as women's and men's softball. The WBSC was established in 2013 by the merger of the International Baseball Federation (IBAF) and International Softball Federation (ISF).

== Early history ==
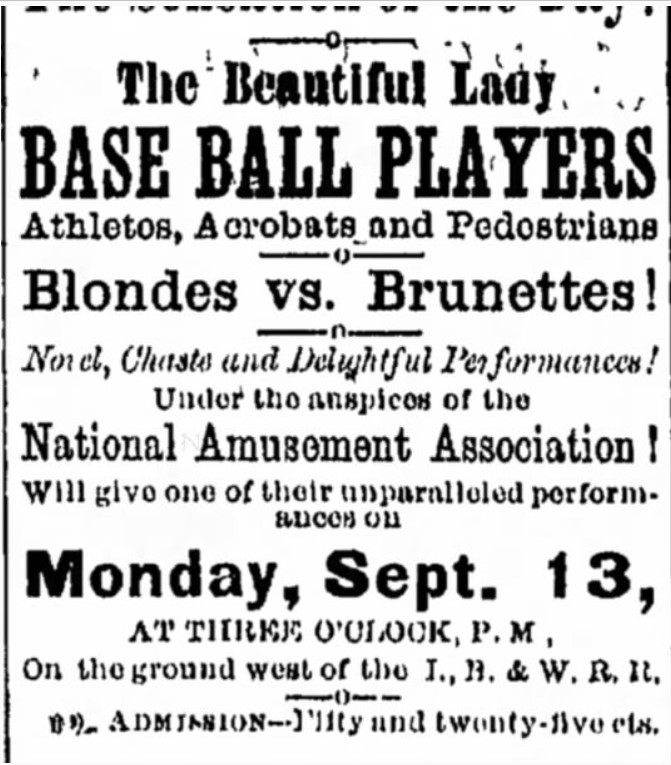
A newspaper advertisement for an exhibition game between the Blondes and Brunettes, 13 Sept., 1875.

The first ticketed women's baseball game was an exhibition match between the Blondes and the Brunettes in 1875 in Springfield, Illinois. The teams scheduled two later games to be played in St. Louis,but after the first game, law enforcement officials threatened to arrest the players if they tried to play again. Low attendance, unfavorable news coverage, and pressure from local police led to disbanding the league after only two weeks.

In 1875, students at Vassar College organized what is credited to be the first women's collegiate baseball team named the Resolutes. Nineteenth-century Victorian culture stressed the physical and mental frailty of women, and many physicians warned women and girls that baseball, like other methods of vigorous exercise, would harm their physical health and reproductive systems. Despite this, students were encouraged by Vassar's resident physician, Dr. Helen Webster, who believed that physical activity would improve their health. Women at other colleges including Smith, Mount Holyoke, and Wellesly formed teams modeled after Vassar. Students at Vassar continued to play until at least 1876.

The Dolly Vardens, the name of two all-female, African-American teams from Chester, Pennsylvania, was assembled by barber-turned-sports entrepreneur John Lang in 1883. An earlier African-American women's team also named the Dolly Vardens is said to have formed in Philadelphia in 1867, one year after the first African-American men's team formed. Another African-American women's team called "Captain Jinks Base Ball Club" is recorded to have played against the Dolly Vardens. Most of the newspaper reporting at the time covered the teams' fashion in greater detail than the outcome of their games.

In the late 1880s through the 1890s, there were a number of barnstorming women's teams that traveled across the country to play exhibition games. These games emphasized entertainment and spectacle over the quality of play. Many of these teams were organized by Sylvester F. Wilson. Wilson was a known to have abducted and assaulted a number of female ballplayers over his career, some of which were minors. He also had multiple recorded arrests and run-ins with the law. Wilson was excellent at marketing, and drew large crowds to the games for the novelty of watching women play baseball. While some of the women on Wilson's teams exhibited great talent, most players were chosen chosen for their physical attractiveness.

Starting in the late 1890s, barnstorming teams known as Bloomer Girls teams, were organized. These teams played exhibition games against teams of men. Bloomer Girl rosters were primarily female, but typically featured at least one male player, sometimes dressed in drag. Two future major leaguers, Smoky Joe Wood and Rogers Hornsby, began their careers playing on Bloomer Girl teams. One particularly talented player was pitcher Maud Nelson, who would later become a manager and owner of several baseball teams. Lizzie Murphy, the first woman to play baseball against major league players, also played for Bloomer Girls teams for nearly 30 years. Bloomer Girl teams continued to regularly tour the United States until the early 1930s.

In 1898, Lizzie Arlington became the first woman to sign a minor league contract with the Atlantic League. On July 5, 1898, she pitched the ninth inning for the Reading Cole Heavers against the Allentown Peanuts. She gave up two hits, but no runs. Arlington succeeded in retiring the next three batters to preserve the victory, as the crowd enthusiastically shouted "Good for Lizzie!"

== Timeline ==
Important events and milestones in women's baseball:

- 1875 – The first women's baseball game for which fans were charged and women players were paid was played between the Blondes and the Brunettes in Springfield, Illinois, on 11 September.
- 1876 – The Resolutes, modeled after the Vassar College team, developed their own version of uniforms which included long-sleeved shirts with frilled high necklines, embroidered belts, wide floor-length skirts, high button shoes and broad striped caps.
- 1880 – A Smith College team was disbanded after disapproving mothers complained about the children playing the sport, saying it was not appropriate for women to play.
- 1880s – The Dolly Vardens, an all-female, African-American team from Chester, Pennsylvania, was assembled by barber-turned-sports entrepreneur John Lang in the 1880s as a team that played for the entertainment of spectators.
- 1920s – Philadelphia had factory teams for women, women's leagues, and the Philadelphia Bobbies for non-working women.
- 1930s – The "Bold Years" for women's baseball; women baseball players toured internationally, played junior baseball, and signed minor league contracts.
- 1937 – A formal women's baseball league is formed in Kingston upon Hull.
- 1943–54 – The All-American Girls Professional Baseball League (AAGPBL) was started by Philip Wrigley, owner of the Chicago Cubs and Wrigley's Chewing Gum.
- 1944–54 – The National Girls Baseball League was founded by Charles Bidwell, owner of the Chicago Cardinals. The league consisted of teams in Chicago and operated for 11 seasons.
- 1946 – Sophie Kurys set the stolen base record for the AAGPBL with 201 stolen bases in 203 attempts; this record continues to be unequalled in baseball history, as Rickey Henderson is second in stolen bases with 130 (1982).
- 1947 – The Racine Belles of the AAGPBL started the Junior Belles baseball program; 100 girls tried out and 60 were selected to play on four teams; the Grays, Greens, Reds, and Golds.
- 1948 – Dottie Wiltse pitched for the AAGPBL up until she was four months pregnant.
- 1948 – The Junior Belles became more popular, as more girls tried out for the teams; other AAGPBL teams, such as the Lassies and the Comets, began to sponsor girls' junior baseball teams.
- 1948 – After five years of playing, the AAGBL (also known as the AAGPBL) starts throwing pitches overhand instead of underhand.
- 1950 – The Racine Belles and Junior Belles folded due to lack of money.
- 1955 – Bill Allington formed two women's teams called Allington's All-Stars which barnstormed the U.S. playing men's town and semi-pro teams, and lasted until 1957.
- 1973 –The Pawtucket Pioneers, and later named the Pawtucket Slaterettes, an all-girl baseball league, was founded in Pawtucket, R.I.
- 1974 - The Little League federal charter was amended, allowing girls to play Little League Baseball.
- 1984 – Former Atlanta Braves executive Bob Hope founded the Sun Sox, an all-women's team, and tried to enter them into the Class A Florida State League; however, the league did not award Hope the franchise.
- 1988 – American Women's Baseball Association (AWBA) founded in Chicago; first organized women's league since AAGPBL (1943–1954).
- 1990s – American Women's Baseball League (AWBL; also known as American Women's Baseball, AWB) was founded by Jim Glennie in an effort to unite women's baseball teams and leagues around the country and to provide support to them.
- 1992 – A League of Their Own movie about the AAGPBL was produced by Penny Marshall.
- 1994 – Bob Hope formed and Coors Brewing Company sponsored the Colorado Silver Bullets women's baseball team which played men's college and minor league teams; the team existed for 4 years.
- 1994 – Women's National Adult Baseball Association (WNABA) formed; 16 women's teams played in a women's world series in Phoenix in 1994.
- 1995 – WNABA had 100 affiliated women's baseball teams in 16 states in the U.S.
- 1997 – Ladies League Baseball was formed by San Diego businessperson Mike Ribant.
- 1998 – After beginning its second season, the Ladies League Baseball expanded to 6 teams and went nationwide, but folded shortly after "due to lack of attendance".
- 2000 – The American Women's Baseball League (AWBL) took women's baseball team to Japan to play Team Energen, the Japanese women's national team.
- 2001 – The first Women's World Series (WWS) was played at the SkyDome in Toronto, Ontario, Canada; countries that participated included the United States of America, Australia, Canada, and Japan – the U.S. won the gold medal.
- 2003 – Pawtucket Slaterettes all-girls' baseball league celebrated its 30th season of all-girls' baseball.
- 2003 – Women's baseball became an official sport (39th) of the AAU; this marked the first time in United States history that a U.S. national organization began sanctioning and supporting women's baseball.
- 2003 – The American Eagles of American Women's Baseball Federation (AWBF) became the first women's baseball team to be sanctioned by USA Baseball.
- 2004 – The first-ever Women's Baseball World Cup was played in Edmonton, Alberta, Canada; the event was sanctioned by the International Baseball Association and Federation (IBAF) and was hosted by Baseball Canada. Women's Baseball World Cup tournaments were held biennially through 2018, cancelled during the COVID pandemic, then held triennially from 2024.
- 2004 – USA Baseball sanctioned the first official national women's baseball team; the team competed in the 2004 WWS (in Japan) and in the 2004 Women's World Cup of Baseball.
- 2004 – John Kovach, manager of the South Bend Blue Sox Women's Baseball Club, director of the Great Lakes Women's Baseball League, and AAU Women's Baseball Youth Baseball Chair, worked out a proposal with Little League Baseball to use the Michiana Girls' Baseball League as a model league to develop girls' Little League Baseball programs around the United States. (The Little League Baseball organization has so far not started a girls' baseball program, as it views the existing main, co-ed divisions as fully integrated, with thousands of girls playing.)
- 2007 – Chicago Pioneers girls' baseball team became the first-ever U.S. Girls' Baseball National Champions after defeating the Pawtucket Slaterettes during the 2007 Women's Baseball National Championship/Girls' Baseball National Championship in Ft. Myers, Florida.
- 2011 – The first ever members clubs are announced for Southern Ontario's Women's Baseball League. Those clubs were located in London, Guelph, St Catharines and Niagara Falls, Ontario, Canada. This was the first ever professional league for women, aged 18 and over, in Ontario and started playing in 2012.
- 2015 – Women's baseball was added to the 2015 Pan American Games.
- 2016 – Twelve teams competed in the 7th Women's Baseball World Cup, the most in history. Japan won the championship at every World Cup from 2008 to 2024.
- 2026 – The Women's Pro Baseball League played its first season. The league consisted of four teams who played all their games at Robin Roberts Stadium in Springfield, Illinois.

== International competition ==
Organized international competition in women's baseball began with the 2001 Women's World Series played in Toronto's Skydome, (now known as the Rogers Centre). Women's World Series events were held in 2002 (St. Petersburg, Florida), in 2003 (Gold Coast, Queensland), and in 2004 (Uozu-city, Japan). These Women's World Series events were organized by the American Women's Baseball Federation and the Women's Baseball Association of Japan. They paved the way for official International Baseball Federation sanctioned Women's World Cup competitions.

In 2004 five countries competed in the first Women's Baseball World Cup in Edmonton, Canada: the United States, Canada, Australia, Japan and Taiwan. Subsequent tournaments have been held every two years, with the US winning the first two in 2004 and 2006, and Japan winning five consecutive gold medals from 2008 to 2016. In 2016, the field included twelve teams, more than had competed in any previous Women's Baseball World Cup: Australia, the Netherlands, Canada, Cuba, the United States, Venezuela, Taiwan, Hong Kong, India, Pakistan, Japan, and South Korea.

The first Pan American Women's Baseball Championship (I Campeonato Panamericano del Béisbol Femenino) was played in Valencia, Venezuela, from 13 to 20 November 2009. Teams that competed were Cuba, Venezuela, Puerto Rico, Colombia, Brazil, and the Dominican Republic. Women's baseball was added to the Pan American Games in 2015.

== See also ==
- All-American Girls Professional Baseball League
- Japan Women's Baseball League
- North American Women's Baseball League
- American Women's Baseball Federation
- Women's Pro Baseball League, planned professional women's league set to launch in 2026.
- USA Baseball
- Women in baseball
