= Elwaine Pomeroy =

American politician

Member of the Kansas Senate from the 18th district
- In office 1973 – May 31, 1984
- Succeeded by: Jeanne Hoferer

Member of the Kansas Senate from the 13th district
- In office 1969–1972

Personal details
- Born: June 4, 1933 Topeka, Kansas
- Died: June 29, 2011
- Party: Republican
- Spouse: Joanne C. Bunge (m. September 30, 1950)
- Children: 3
- Education: Washburn University (B.A.); Washburn University School of Law (J.D.)

Elwaine Franklin Pomeroy (June 4, 1933–June 29, 2011) was an American politician and lawyer who served for 16 years in the Kansas State Senate.

Pomeroy was born in Topeka, Kansas, where he sold war bonds as a Boy Scout during World War II. He attended Washburn University for both undergraduate study and law school, and worked as a lawyer. In 1968, he was elected to the Kansas Senate, where he served for four terms, including spending eight years as chair of the Judiciary Committee. In 1984, he resigned from the Senate to serve on the Kansas Parole Board, where he served until 1990, after which he resumed private practice and worked as a lobbyist.
