= American Amateur Baseball Congress =

The American Amateur Baseball Congress (AABC) is an amateur baseball organization in the United States for players from sub-teens through adults. Founded in 1935, it coordinates its programs with USA Baseball and the American Baseball Coaches Association. AABC has eight (8) age-range divisions in the U.S., Puerto Rico, and Canada. There are also five (5) single-age divisions: 9's, 11's, 13's, 15's, and 17's. In some leagues, however, all divisions are age-range and none are single-age.

Under the AABC, each league has at least four (4) teams, each of which plays at least six (6) league games. Each league's winner goes on to state-tournament play. The winner of each state tournament goes to regional play and from there to the world series.

== History ==
See footnote

AABC's 75th annual meeting was held on October 30, 2010, in San Antonio, Texas.

== Divisions ==
See footnote

- 19 (& over) Stan Musial Baseball
- 18U Connie Mack Baseball
- 17s Don Mattingly Baseball
- 16U Mickey Mantle Baseball
- 15s Ken Griffey Jr. Baseball
- 14U Sandy Koufax Baseball
- 13s Sandy Koufax 13S Baseball
- 12U Pee Wee Reese Baseball
- 11s Gil Hodges Baseball
- 10U Willie Mays Baseball
- 9s Jackie Robinson Baseball
- 6, 7, 8 Roberto Clemente Baseball
- 6U Rod Carew Baseball

== World Series ==
See footnote

=== Stan Musial World Series ===
In general
Past Champions

=== Connie Mack World Series ===
History
Past Champions

=== Don Mattingly World Series ===
2006
2010
2011

=== Mickey Mantle World Series ===
In general
2011

=== Ken Griffey Jr World Series ===
2010

=== Sandy Koufax 14U World Series ===
2009
2010
2011

=== Sandy Koufax 13S World Series ===
2011 West Michigan Broncos

=== Pee Wee Reese World Series ===
Ball fields
2009
2010
2011

2014 Dallas, Texas

=== Gil Hodges World Series ===
2007
2010
2011

2013 Hamden Yard Dogs (Hamden, Connecticut)

2014 Bonnie Seals (Brooklyn, NY)

=== Willie Mays World Series ===
Ball fields
2010
2011

2014 Brooklyn Blue Storm

=== Jackie Robinson World Series ===
2009
2010
2011

=== Roberto Clemente World Series ===
2008
2011

== Regions ==
- East Central:
- North Atlantic: Connecticut, Delaware, Maine, Maryland, Massachusetts, New Hampshire, New Jersey, New York, Rhode Island, Vermont, Eastern Pennsylvania, Washington, D.C., Ontario (Canada), and Quebec (Canada)
- North Central:
- South East Region: Alabama, Arkansas, Florida, Georgia, Louisiana, Mississippi, North Carolina, South Carolina, and Tennessee
- South Plains:
- West Region: Alaska, Arizona, Northern California, Southern California, Hawaii, Idaho, Montana, Nevada, Oregon, Utah, Washington, Wyoming, British Columbia (Canada), and Baja (Mexico)
- Puerto Rico:

== State leagues ==
See footnote

- Arizona Amateur Baseball Association
- Northern California Association of AABC
- AABC South Coast Baseball League (Orange County, California)
- Colorado AABC (CAABC)
- Connecticut Amateur Baseball Congress (CABC)
- Florida Amateur Baseball Association (FABA)
- AABC of Georgia
- Northeastern Kentucky AABC Association (NEKA)
- Michigan Association – AABC (Michigan AABC)
- Minnesota AABC
- New Jersey Amateur Baseball Congress (NJABC)
- New Mexico Amateur Baseball Association
- New York Metropolitan Amateur Baseball League (NYMABL)
- Ohio Association – AABC (Ohio AABC)
- AABC of Texas
- Amateur Baseball Congress of Washington (ABCW)

== See also ==
- Amateur baseball in the United States
- USA Baseball
- Baseball awards § U.S. youth baseball
