= History of women's baseball in the United Kingdom =

Women's baseball in the United Kingdom emerged as early as 1929 in London among local women workers. By 1931, multiple teams, including the Kodak Hawkeye of London and another from Cardiff, were playing against each other. In Yorkshire, women's baseball became so popular that by 1937, a formal league had formed, dominated by the Hull Nomads until World War II. Locals watched North American military personnel, such as the women from the all Black 6888th Central Postal Directory Battalion stationed at Birmingham, play; despite this, post-war revival efforts failed. Women continued to play in coed leagues until the organization Women's Baseball UK (WB-UK) created the first women's domestic league in the UK in 80 years. In 2020, the British Baseball Federation established the Great Britain women's national baseball team.

== Emergence in the London region ==
In 1929 an exhibition baseball match took place between the women of the West End theatre production company of The Five O'Clock Girl at Stamford Bridge. In the early 1930s informal women's baseball teams such as Middlesex Ladies were being formed in the London region and playing occasional games in Wealdstone. By this time the Kodak research facility had been established at the Kodak Harrow site, and with ties internationally to Rochester, New York it appears more than coincidental that baseball was popular in the area. Initially formed in 1926, by 1931 the baseball section of the Kodak Recreation Society had three teams in a works based women's league.

The most successful of these teams was Hawkeye, who had won the previous two Kodak League Cups, played under 'Canadian softball rules'. The Coach of the baseball players was Toronto native Eddie Lynch, who was so impressed with Hawkeye that he openly challenged all-comers to try and defeat his team, with the winner to be crowned winners of the 'European Championship of Baseball'. The first club to accept the challenge were St Dyfrig's Girls Team, of Cardiff, who were defeated 10–8, with the Kodak Hawkeye team made up predominantly of factory typists, and thus claimed the title of European Champions of Baseball.

British Celanese were another manufacturing company who encouraged baseball among its female workers via works teams, Kodak's Hawkeye team defeated them twice prior to the European Championship challenge had been laid down by Lynch. The Kodak works baseball teams were still going strong as late as 1935. In 1936 two women's clubs were formed at Hackney, by the founder of the Hackney Royals, Fred Whitehead, and to be coached by Royals Coach Irving 'Snooker' Ruvinsky. Ruvinsky, a catcher originally from Montreal, was part of the Great Britain roster that won the 1938 Baseball World Cup. Whitehead proposed that the players would be female staff from the Hackney greyhounds and local female speedway fans. In 1937 the Kodak girls were invited to challenge West Ham girls, prior to a senior men's West Ham game, in an effort to promote the women's game, and the Kodak team were described as "pioneers of ladies baseball".

== Rise and fall in Yorkshire ==
In April 1936 Alfred T. Grogan, honorary Secretary Treasurer of the newly formed Yorkshire County Baseball Association, was bombarded by requests from women in the region for the establishment of a women's team, which would be the first of its kind in the North of England. It was not long before Leeds Pioneers and Greenfield Amazons (Bradford) were formed and preparing to play against each other. That August the first ever women's baseball game played in Leeds took place at Elland Road and in Bradford, at Greenfield Stadium. Grogan reportedly received an invitation for these West Yorkshire clubs to form a representative England team to tour Australia.

By October 1936 two women's clubs had also appeared in Kingston upon Hull, and Grogan turned his attention to the establishment of a formal women's league, these two teams were given coaching by Elliott Lydiatt. It was noted that 40% of spectators at men's baseball games in Hull were women, which was a primary driver for Grogan to develop women's organised baseball in the area. Six women's teams were formed, including works sides of Reckitt and Sons and Needler's.

A formal league was finally established for the 1937 season, with the support of Chet Adams, who was the newly appointed Manager of the men's Hull Baseball Club. At a meeting at Christ Church, Hull, attended by representatives from Reckitts along with Lydiatt, Grogan and Rev H. J. Munday, Chairman of Hull Amateur Baseball League. It was agreed that Lydiatt, a well known pitcher and member of the National Baseball Association, would organise good coaching for the women. Grogan stated that teams were being formed in Leeds and other parts of Yorkshire, along with Hull, and that it was expected that a Yorkshire representative side would be selected to challenge a London representative side at West Ham Stadium.

In May 1937 members of Castleford Urban Council formed a women's team to play against Castleford Tigers, another local woman's team. The women were starting to create an impression in the press, in June 1937 Irene Lockwood of Leeds Pioneers was described in the Daily Mirror as "the Babe Ruth of Leeds", following their 19–9 victory over Castleford Tigers. Young girls were also being inspired by the baseball playing ladies, Castleford Tigers chose four-year old Greta Scott as their mascot.

By this stage Hull had established a league with six women's teams, Castleford had two teams, Bradford had two teams, Leeds had one, and Eddie Gladu was coaching the women of Sheffield, and the establishment of an inter-city league was a genuine prospect. In fact baseball had really caught the imagination of the women of Yorkshire, Hull Nomads were so inundated with applications to play for them that they were forced to create two additional teams alongside their senior side and Craven Park, Hull was often used for games. The 1937 season saw teams from across the Hull area join the league, including Young Women's Christian Association, Co-Op Ladies, Hull Pioneer White Caps and Boulevesco.

In January 1938 Mr R. E. Lewis, Secretary of newly formed the Coventry Thursday Baseball League, asked for women interested in forming women's teams to contact him. He erroneously believed this league would be the first women's baseball league in the country. In truth, the league in Hull was the only women's league in the United Kingdom. By the 1938 season the women's section of the Hull Amateur League was expanded to two divisions of six teams, with Hull G. Girls and Alexandra Laundry joining the league. Teams were also competing for the Yorkshire Ladies Baseball Cup and the Infirmary Cup. During this golden age Hull Nomads were dominant, much to the joy of their president, the Sheriff of Hull, Wallace Rockett, such was the impact of the league that the American Consul in Hull, Ilo Clare Funk, donated a silver trophy for the league winners.

The 1939 season had eight teams competing, including Alexandra Nationals and Hammonds Royals The impact of World War II began to negatively affect the league, it was expected that in the 1940 season some clubs would play friendlies rather than join the league and that teams would be created from local defence units. Indeed, on the eve of the 1940 season only four teams had joined the league Across this era Hull Nomads won the league championship, Ladies Baseball Cup and the Infirmary Cup multiple times. The Nomads had incredibly won the league every year, since its inception in 1937 and had even defeated the men's team, Beetonsville Diamonds.

== Wartime decline ==
As war took hold on life in the United Kingdom there were opportunities for the baseball playing ladies to use their experience against the military. Hull Nomads competed against a men's team for the second time, in an exhibition game versus Hull Air Cadets. The exploits of North American service personnel playing baseball in wartime United Kingdom have been documented, but few are aware that the people of Birmingham were lucky enough to witness the women of "Six Triple Eight" playing baseball in their city. In 1945 the Birmingham Mail described how locals would often enjoy watching the ladies from the all black 6888th Central Postal Directory Battalion enjoying playing baseball, during their down time. In the Aldershot area, Canadian women serving in the United Kingdom established the Canadian Women's Baseball League.

At the conclusion of hostilities there was an effort to revive women's baseball in the United Kingdom, especially in the former hotbed of Hull. In 1948 preparations got underway to revive the league, but this never came to fruition. In 1949 it was announced that some women were already in training and that a women's section of the Hull Baseball League was to be formed, but again it proved futile. Whilst men's domestic baseball shrunk after the war, women's all but vanished.

== In the 21st century ==
Baseball in the United Kingdom has a long history, and a well established men's senior representative side, but it was not until 2020 that a women's side was established by the British Baseball Federation. Amanda ‘Doris’ Hocking, who had spearheaded the formation of Women's Baseball UK, the body that created the first women's domestic league in the United Kingdom for 80 years, was appointed as the first General Manager.

However, in April 2021 Hocking resigned in protest over a tweet made by the British Baseball Federation's Twitter account, which was widely perceived to have sexualised women in baseball. Amongst those who supported Hocking for her stance was men's senior team Manager, Drew Spencer. The President of the British Baseball Federation, Gerry Perez, was forced to resign, after a week of defending the tweet and refusing to remove it.
