= Marge Petty =

American politician

Member of the Kansas Senate from the 18th district
- In office 1989–2000
- Preceded by: Jeanne Hoferer
- Succeeded by: David D. Jackson

Personal details
- Born: February 26, 1946 (age 80) Fort Wayne, Indiana, U.S.
- Party: Democratic
- Children: 2
- Education: Texas Christian University (B.A.); University of Kansas (M.A.); Washburn University (J.D.)

Marjorie "Marge" Petty (born February 26, 1946) is an American former politician who served for 12 years in the Kansas State Senate.

Petty was born in Indiana, and her family moved to Midland, Texas when she was young; she attended Texas Christian University and briefly lived in Chicago before moving to Topeka. She entered elected office in 1985 when she was elected to the Topeka City Council, serving there until 1989, during which time she studied for her master's degree at the University of Kansas and her Juris Doctor degree from the Washburn University School of Law.

In the 1988 election, Petty successfully won election as a Democrat to Kansas's 18th Senate district. She was re-elected twice, in 1992 and 1996. In 2000, Petty ran for re-election, but lost her race to Republican David D. Jackson.

After leaving the Kansas Senate, Petty worked at the Kansas Corporation Commission from 2003 to 2008. In 2009, President Barack Obama appointed her as a regional representative for the Department of Health and Human Services and she moved to Dallas, Texas.
