= Mike Burgess (Kansas politician) =

American politician

Michael Burgess

Member of the Kansas House of Representatives from the 51st district
- In office January 13, 2003 – January 14, 2013
- Preceded by: Cindy Hermes
- Succeeded by: Ron Highland

Personal details
- Born: November 19, 1975 (age 50)
- Party: Republican
- Spouse: Megan
- Children: 2
- Education: Kansas State University

Michael Brooks Burgess (November 19, 1975) is a former Republican member of the Kansas House of Representatives, representing the 51st district. He has served from 2003 to 2013.

Burgess, who works as a web developer, has a BA in Journalism/Mass Communication from Kansas State University.

He is a board member of the Shawnee County Fair Association and past chair of the Public Relations Society of America Technology Section.

== Committee and caucus membership ==
- Energy and Utilities
- Transportation
- Government Efficiency and Fiscal Oversight (Vice-Chair)
- Joint Committee on Information Technology
- Congressional Motorcycle Safety Caucus

== Major donors ==
The top 5 donors to Burgess' 2008 campaign are mostly professional organizations:

- 1. Kansas Contractors Assoc $1,000
- 2. AT&T $500
- 3. Kansas Medical Society $500
- 4. Northeast Kansas Building & Construction Trades Council $500
- 5. Lewis, John G $500
