= Ron Highland =

American politician (born 1947)

Member of the Kansas House of Representatives from the 51st district
- In office January 14, 2013 – January 9, 2023
- Preceded by: Mike Burgess
- Succeeded by: Kenny Titus

Personal details
- Born: March 1, 1947 (age 79) Brewster, Kansas, U.S.
- Party: Republican
- Spouse: Linda
- Education: Kansas State University
- Profession: Veternarian

Ron Highland (born March 1, 1947) is an American politician who served as a member of the Kansas House of Representatives from 2013 to 2023. He was elected in 2012 as a Republican and lives in Wamego. The American Conservative Union had given him a lifetime evaluation of 80%. He did not seek re-election in 2022.
