= David D. Jackson =

American politician

David Jackson

Member of the Kansas Senate from the 18th district
- In office January 8, 2001 – January 10, 2005
- Preceded by: Marge Petty
- Succeeded by: Laura Kelly

Member of the Kansas House of Representatives

Personal details
- Born: November 7, 1946 (age 79) Topeka, Kansas, U.S.
- Party: Republican
- Spouse: Annette Jackson

David D. Jackson (born November 7, 1946) is an American former politician who served as a Republican in the Kansas State Senate from 2001 to 2004.

Jackson is the owner of a greenhouse in Topeka. He was originally elected to the Senate in 2000. In the 2004 election, he faced a challenge from Democrat (and future Governor) Laura Kelly for his Senate seat in the 18th district; Jackson was narrowly defeated in the general election, taking 49.8% of the vote and losing by fewer than 100 votes in the final count.

In 2016, Jackson attempted to win back the seat, challenging Kelly once again. He lost another close election, this time claiming 48.3% of the vote.
