= USA Baseball =

Governing body for baseball in the United States

- Formation: January 6, 1965 (61 years ago)
- Headquarters: Cary, North Carolina, U.S.
- Executive Director: Paul Seiler
- President: John Gall
- Website: usabaseball.com

The United States Baseball Federation, doing business as USA Baseball, is a 501(c)(3) nonprofit organization that serves as the national governing body for baseball in the United States. USA Baseball is a member of the United States Olympic & Paralympic Committee and the World Baseball Softball Confederation. The organization is responsible for the selection of the United States national team for various international competition, including the senior professional team (World Baseball Classic, Olympic, Premier12, and Pan American Games), the collegiate national team, the various youth national teams (18U, 15U, and 12U), and the women's national team.

Tracing its origins to the formation of the U.S. Amateur Baseball Federation by Leslie Mann in 1932, the modern USA Baseball organization was sanctioned in 1978. USA Baseball is the chief organizer of non-collegiate (Note: College baseball in the United States is governed by the National Collegiate Athletic Association (NCAA).) amateur baseball initiatives through its Sport Development department, including Play Ball and Pitch Smart. USA Baseball also presents the Golden Spikes Award annually to the top collegiate baseball player in the country and is responsible for creating the USABat standard. Although USA Baseball does not have jurisdiction over professional baseball leagues such as Major League Baseball or its affiliates, the organizations cooperate in the development of the sport in the United States, and many MLB and minor league players have represented the U.S. internationally in major baseball tournaments.

Since 1997, no player has used uniform number 42 out of respect for Jackie Robinson, which was the same year the number was retired across Major League Baseball.

== History ==
=== Predecessor organizations ===
The first ever US national baseball team took the field in the 1900 Summer Olympics in Paris, France, in an unofficial capacity, with the same composition in the 1904 Olympics in St. Louis, which constituted the first time the game had been presented to the Games' American audiences. In 1912, yet another demonstration event occurred in the Summer Olympics in Stockholm. Only one player on the roster, Jim Thorpe, had extensive experience in the two demonstration games that were held, as the majority of players were track and field athletes.

The national governing body is a de facto successor to the USA Baseball Congress, founded in 1931 by former major league outfielder Leslie Mann, who is also regarded in high esteem as founder of the International Baseball Federation (IBAF). That organization helped formalize the establishment of a full time national team program and regulate amateur baseball nationally. Under Leslie's guidance, the nascent Team USA, following a 20-game friendship tour of Japan in 1935 took part in the demonstration match at the Summer Olympics in Berlin the next year and participated in the first Amateur World Series (later known as the Baseball World Cup) two years later. They took part in a further two more AWS tournaments before the Second World War.

After 1942, Mann's USA Baseball Congress became inactive. American representation in international competition was eventually taken up by collegiate athletic groups took part, with an all-NCAA team of college athletes taking part in the Pan American Games since the first edition held in 1951. This would be the basis of the current USA Baseball Collegiate National Team, which would go on to play an exhibition game at the 1964 Summer Olympics in Japan. Before that, the only post-WWII team the country fielded in the Summer Olympic Games was in the demonstration game in Melbourne at the 1956 Summer Olympics, with the U.S. Far East Command providing the servicemen that competed.

Several baseball groups coalesced to form the United States Baseball Federation in early 1962, with Everett D. Barnes of the American Association of College Baseball Coaches as its president. This version of the USBF initially existed as an affiliate of the National Collegiate Athletic Association. During this time, the group was not sanctioned by the U.S. Olympic Committee, and it clashed with the Amateur Athletic Union (which at the time controlled the USOC) for the right to organize national baseball teams and participate in International Baseball Federation competitions; these tensions came to a head during the selection process for the 1964 Summer Olympic team.

After the 1964 Olympics, the modern incarnation of the USBF was officially incorporated in Michigan on January 6, 1965. However, at this point, it was still operating without official sanction from the USOC.

=== USA Baseball ===
USA Baseball in its modern form was established as a result of the Amateur Sports Act of 1978, which officially recognized the United States Olympic Committee as the governing body of all Olympic sports in the country, removing the AAU from the position. As the United States received hosting rights for the 1984 Summer Olympics with Los Angeles, the time would come for the birth of a new group to spearhead baseball efforts in the country. USA Baseball was originally based in Trenton, New Jersey upon its establishment on the basis of the old USBF in Michigan.

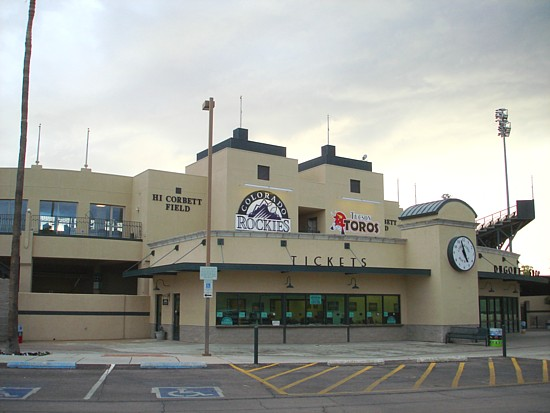
Hi Corbett Field, Tucson, Arizona

The U.S. Baseball Federation then moved to Tucson, Arizona in November 1997 with its facilities being headquartered at Hi Corbett Field and would adopt the brand USA Baseball as its official identity, one it carries to the present. It would spend five years in Tucson before moving to its current home in Cary, North Carolina in 2003.

=== 14U and 16U national teams ===
From 1997 to 2011, USA Baseball fielded a 16U national team that participated in the International Baseball Federation World Youth Championships, as well as other tournaments, including the COPABE Pan American Youth Championships and the 1999 PAL World Series.

In its 15-year history, the USA Baseball 16U national team experienced significant success on the international stage. Team USA made it to the championship game of every international tournament it appeared in, taking home 11 gold medals – including nine in World Championships – and three silvers. In addition, eight of those teams went undefeated in international play. The program holds an overall historical record of 99–10 against international opponents, including 54–2 at the World Championships.

The 14U national team was created in 2007 and fielded teams for the COPABE Pan American Championships and Pan American Championships Qualifiers until 2011. In that time, the program went undefeated five times in six international tournaments, earning five gold medals and one bronze in its history and finishing with a 39–2 overall record.

In 2011, the two teams were discontinued after the World Baseball Softball Confederation (WBSC) changed its youth championships age discipline to 15U. The programs were replaced with the 15U national team and the 14U national team development program.

=== USA Baseball at the Olympic Games ===
Baseball was first introduced to the Summer Olympic Games as a demonstration sport at the Los Angeles 1984 Olympics and returned as an exhibition sport at the Seoul 1988 Games. In 1984, the United States came in second, falling to Japan in the final, 6–3. Four years later, Team USA got Olympic redemption as it won the gold medal, defeating Japan in the final 5–3.

Baseball was open only to male amateurs in 1992 and 1996. As a result, the Americans and other nations where professional baseball is developed relied on collegiate players, while the Cubans used their most experienced veterans, who technically were considered amateurs as they nominally held other jobs, but in fact trained full-time. In 2000, professionals were admitted, but Major League Baseball did not release its players in 2000, 2004, and 2008, and the situation changed only a little: the Cubans still used their best players, while the Americans started using minor leaguers. The IOC cited the absence of the best players as the main reason for baseball being dropped from the Olympic program.

In contrast, Japan's Nippon Professional Baseball has allowed its players to compete in the Olympics, and paused its 2021 season for the duration of the 2020 Tokyo Olympics (held in 2021).

At the International Olympic Committee meeting on July 7, 2005, baseball and softball were voted out of the 2012 Summer Olympics in London, United Kingdom, becoming the first sports voted out of the Olympics since polo was eliminated from the 1936 Olympics. The two slots left available by the IOC's elimination were subsequently filled by golf and rugby sevens in 2016. This decision was reaffirmed on February 9, 2006. In the stands during the 2008 bronze medal game between the U.S. and Japan, IOC president Jacques Rogge was interviewed by MLB.com's Mark Newman and cited various criteria for baseball to earn its way back in: "To be on the Olympic program is an issue where you need universality as much as possible. You need to have a sport with a following, you need to have the best players and you need to be in strict compliance with WADA (World Anti-Doping Agency). And these are the qualifications that have to be met. When you have all that, you have to win hearts. You can win the mind, but you still must win hearts."

It was officially decided in August 2009 at the IOC Board meeting in Berlin that baseball would also not be included in the 2016 Summer Olympics. On April 1, 2011, the IBAF and the International Softball Federation announced they were preparing a joint proposal to revive play of both sports at the 2020 Summer Olympics. In August 2011, Olympic news source Around the Rings reported that the ISF and IBAF would not rush into an Olympic proposal, and that the IBAF was working on forming a temporary commission to analyze the prospect of a joint proposal. "In the past, baseball and softball were running alone, and the result was that baseball and softball stayed out," IBAF president Riccardo Fraccari said in reference to their decades-long push for Olympic inclusion. On September 8, 2013, the International Olympic Committee voted to reinstate wrestling, defeating the combined baseball-softball bid for the 2020 Summer Olympics.

Under new IOC policies that shift the Games to an "event-based" program rather than sport-based, the host organizing committee can now also propose the addition of temporary sports to the program alongside the permanent "core" events. A second bid for baseball-softball to be included as an event in 2020 was shortlisted by the Tokyo Organizing Committee on June 22, 2015 due to baseball's popularity in Japan. On August 3, 2016, during the 129th IOC Session in Rio de Janeiro, Brazil, the IOC approved the Tokyo Organizing Committee's final shortlist of five sports, which included baseball, to be included in the program during the 2020 Summer Olympics. Baseball will not be included in the 2024 Paris Olympics, but it is expected that it will be included along with softball, in the 2028 Los Angeles Olympics due to baseball's popularity in the United States.

USA Baseball started using minor league athletes for the first time in 1999, with the 2000 Olympic Team being one of the first professional national teams to represent the U.S. in international competition. Led by Manager Tommy Lasorda and featuring players Ben Sheets, Ernie Young, and Brad Wilkerson, Team USA went 8–1 in the tournament en route to the Olympic gold medal. The 2000 Olympic Team was later named the USOC Team of the Year.

After failing to qualify for the Athens 2004 Games, the U.S. returned to the Olympics in 2008, finishing with a 6–3 record and claiming the bronze medal with an 8–4 defeat of Japan.

=== World Baseball Classic 2023 ===
The World Baseball Classic is a national team tournament that is staged every four years. The most recent one in 2023 included a record points performance from Team USA's Trea Turner. They lost the championship against Japan, 2–3.

== National teams ==
=== Professional national team ===
Established in 1999, the Professional National Team section (USAB-PNT) is the flagship and seniormost of all the national teams of USA Baseball. Since 1999, USA Baseball has been selecting teams of professional-level Minor and Major League (MLB) players to represent the United States in various international competitions, including the Olympic Games and World Baseball Classic. It constitutes the most elite and prestigious of all the team programs and its rosters have occasionally come from the teams mentioned below.

It carries the heritage (but not the lineage) of the national demonstration teams the nation sent to the Summer Olympics of 1900-04, 1912 and 1936, and the military demostration team of 1956.

==== Olympics and related competitions' PNT ====
The first professional national team that the organization selected participated in the 1999 Pan American Games in Winnipeg. The team went 5–2 in the tournament, eventually making it to the gold medal game, where it lost to Cuba 5–1 to claim the silver medal.

Also among the first teams of minor league players that USA Baseball fielded was the 2000 U.S. Olympic Baseball Team, managed by Tommy Lasorda at the Sydney 2000 Olympic Games. Behind a stellar performance on the mound by Ben Sheets, the team of minor league players defeated Cuba for the gold medal. In 2008, a Davey Johnson-led U.S. team, featuring Dexter Fowler, Matt LaPorta, and Stephen Strasburg, took home the bronze medal from the Beijing Games. The USA returned to Olympic baseball in 2021 with Mike Scioscia as team manager, claiming silver medals after losing to Japan in the championship game.

In 2011, USA Baseball fielded one team of professional minor league players to compete in both the World Cup and Pan American Games. The Pan American team posted a 10–6 record and took home the silver medal from Lagos de Moreno, Mexico. Joe Thurston and Brett Jackson led the team offensively, and Andy Van Hekken and Drew Smyly contributed strong pitching performances.

The World Cup team was named co-bronze medalist of the IBAF Baseball World Cup, which was played in Panama. The U.S. shared the honor with Canada after their bronze-medal game was rained out.

In 2015, USA Baseball fielded two professional national teams, once again made up of minor league players, for the Toronto 2015 Pan American Games and the WBSC Premier12. The U.S. claimed the silver medal in both events. The Pan American Games roster featured Albert Almora, Jr., Tyler Pastornicky, Paul Sewald, and Zach Eflin, while the Premier12 team was led by Matt McBride, Adam Frazier, and Anthony Vasquez.

USA Baseball once again fielded a collegiate-minor league national team in 2019 for the WBSC Premier12. The event was a qualifier for the 2020 Summer Olympics in Tokyo and was to be held in November.

Professional National Team Gold Medals
Year	Tournament
2017	World Baseball Classic
2009	XXXVIII Baseball World Cup
2007	XXXVII Baseball World Cup
2005	CONCEBE Regional Olympic Qualifier
2000	Sydney 2000 Olympic Games

==== World Baseball Classic national team ====
Following the removal of baseball from the Olympic program in 2005, the World Baseball Classic (WBC) was proposed by MLB, the Major League Baseball Players Association, and other professional baseball leagues and their players associations around the world. Subsequently, the tournament was created and the first installment was played in 2006. Unique to the event is the use of MLB players on the rosters, marking the first team in USA Baseball history to feature MLB-level athletes.

For the inaugural 2006 World Baseball Classic, Team USA featured stars such as Chase Utley, Derek Jeter, and Chipper Jones. In the second installment of the WBC in 2009, with Dustin Pedroia, Jimmy Rollins, and Jeter donning the red, white, and blue, the U.S. team finished fourth, losing to Japan in the semifinals.

The 2013 WBC team was managed by Joe Torre and led by David Wright, Joe Mauer, and Rollins. Team USA advanced to the second round of the tournament before falling to Puerto Rico.

Team USA had its best showing in the tournament so far in 2017, taking home the Classic championship crown. Managed by Jim Leyland and featuring Marcus Stroman, Christian Yelich, Adam Jones, Eric Hosmer, Buster Posey, and Brandon Crawford, the U.S. went 6–2 en route to the title. The team opened the tournament with a dramatic 3–2 walk-off victory in extra innings over Colombia and defeated the defending champions Dominican Republic – with the help of an iconic catch from Jones that denied Manny Machado a home run in the second round to advance to the semifinals.

Following a rain-soaked 2–1 victory over Japan, Team USA went head-to-head against Puerto Rico, which had beaten the U.S. 6–5 earlier in the tournament, in the final, and put together an 8–0 win. Stroman got the start and took a no-hitter into the seventh inning of the contest, giving up just one hit and one walk in his six innings of work. The offense backed up Stroman's outing with a 13-hit showing that led to eight runs, five of which came with two outs, to secure the shutout victory and USA Baseball's first WBC championship.

Stroman was named the MVP of the tournament, while Hosmer (1B) and Yelich (OF) were both named to the WBC All-Tournament team.

Returning in 2023, this time with Mark DeRosa as team skipper, the national WBC squad, led by OF Mike Trout, led the Team USA on a near successful defense of the championship, ending up with silver. In 2026, the United States advanced to its third championship game in a row, but again fell short.

ALL-TIME TEAM USA WORLD BASEBALL CLASSIC RESULTS:

2006 World Baseball Classic
Date	Opponent	Score (Result)
3/7/06	Mexico	2–0 (W)
3/8/06	Canada	8–6 (L)
3/10/06	South Africa	17–0 (W)
3/12/06	Japan	4–3 (W)
3/13/06	Korea	7–3 (L)
3/16/06	Mexico	2–1 (L)

2009 World Baseball Classic
Date	Opponent	Score (Result)
3/7/09	Canada	6–5 (W)
5/8/09	Venezuela	15–6 (W)
3/11/09	Venezuela	5–3 (L)
3/14/09	Puerto Rico	11–1 (L)
3/15/09	Netherlands	9–3 (W)
3/17/09	Puerto Rico	6–5 (W)
3/18/09	Venezuela	10–6 (L)
3/22/09	Japan	9–4 (L)

2013 World Baseball Classic
Date	Opponent	Score (Result)
3/8/13	Mexico	5–2 (L)
3/9/13	Italy	6–2 (W)
3/10/13	Canada	9–4 (W)
3/12/13	Puerto Rico	7–1 (W)
3/14/13	Dominican Republic	3–1 (L)
3/15/13	Puerto Rico	4–3 (L)

2017 World Baseball Classic
Date	Opponent	Score (Result)
3/10/17	Colombia	3–2, 10 innings (W)
3/11/17	Dominican Republic	7–5 (L)
3/12/17	Canada	8–0 (W)
3/15/17	Venezuela	4–2 (W)
3/17/17	Puerto Rico	6–5 (L)
3/18/17	Dominican Republic	6–3 (W)
3/21/17	Japan	2–1 (W)
3/22/17	Puerto Rico (Championship Game)	8–0 (W)

=== Collegiate national team ===
The USA Baseball collegiate national team (CNT) is composed of the top draft-ineligible collegiate baseball players in the country. The team competes each summer in a schedule of exhibition games across the U.S. and overseas against the world's top baseball talent. As part of this schedule, the U.S. takes on the Japan Collegiate All-Stars nearly every summer and squares off in international friendship series against Canada, Chinese Taipei, Cuba, and the Netherlands.

The collegiate program has had great success in recent years. In 2009, the U.S. won the inaugural World Baseball Challenge in Canada, and the 2011 team posted an 11–2–1 record, defeating Japan in four of five games during their international friendship series.

In 2013, the USA-Cuba International Friendship series returned to the U.S. for the first time since 1996, with Team USA putting together a historic five-game sweep of the Cuban senior national team. The collegiate national team also traveled abroad to compete in the 39th annual USA vs. Japan Collegiate All-Star series, where the host nation claimed a 3–2 series victory.

The 2014 collegiate national team also enjoyed success in its summer tour, finishing with an 18–8–2 record, including going 7–1 in the XXVIII Haarlem Baseball Week tournament. In 2016, Team USA traveled to Cuba for the fifth installment of the USA vs. Cuba International Friendship series. For the first time in USA Baseball history, the team claimed a series against Cuba on Cuban soil, courtesy of Keston Hiura's pinch-hit home run in the final game of the series that secured a 2–1 defeat of the host country and a 3–2 series victory.

In 2017, the collegiate national team contributed to USA Baseball's historic sweep of international competition with series wins over all three of its international opponents that year, including Chinese Taipei, Cuba, and Japan. The 2018 collegiate national team then followed that with another sweep, once again collecting series wins over Chinese Taipei, Cuba, and Japan. The program followed its 2017 success with another strong showing in 2018, once again sweeping its three international series against Chinese Taipei, Japan, and Cuba and finishing with an 11–3 record in international play. The series win against Cuba was just the second time in USA Baseball history that the team has won a series against Cuba on Cuban soil.

Players who have taken the field for the collegiate national team and have gone on to have successful MLB careers include Jim Abbott, Alex Bregman, Kris Bryant, Troy Glaus, Todd Helton, Ryan Howard, Barry Larkin, Tino Martinez, Pedroia, David Price, Huston Street, Dansby Swanson, Mark Teixeira, Troy Tulowitzki, Jason Varitek, and Ryan Zimmerman.

Established 1951 in time for the first ever Pan American Games, it constitutes the oldest continuous active component of the national program, and participated in every major international baseball event until 1998. For many years before the PNT was created in 1999 the CNT was the flagship of the national programs USA Baseball offered to younger players and was the sole team program of the federation from its foundation until the 1980s when the 18U team was created.

Collegiate National Team Gold Medals
Year	Tournament
2014	XXVIII Haarlem Baseball Week
2009	World Baseball Challenge
2008	XXV Haarlem Baseball Week
2008	IV FISU World University Games
2006	FISU World University Championships
2004	FISU World University Championships
2002	XXII Haarlem Baseball Week
2000	XXI Haarlem Baseball Week
1995	National Baseball Congress World Series
1988	Seoul 1988 Olympic Games
1974	XXIII Baseball World Cup
1973	XXII Baseball World Cup
1967	V Pan American Games

=== 18U national team ===
Composed of the nation's top players ages 16 to 18, the USA Baseball 18U national team is a major power on the international baseball scene. The team competes in two major events in biannual cycles – the COPABE Pan American "AAA" Championships and the WBSC U-18 Baseball World Cup. The program has won seven straight international tournament titles dating back to 2011, including winning the last four WBSC U-18 Baseball World Cups in 2012, 2013, 2015, and 2017.

In 2017, the 18U national team continued USA Baseball's unprecedented sweep of international competition with a dominant showing in the WBSC U-18 Baseball World Cup. The team went undefeated for just the second time in the program's history, and the first since 1989, while the pitching staff tallied an incredible 0.47 collective ERA en route to the gold medal.

For the second consecutive year, the 18U national team finished a stellar USA Baseball season on a high note. The team traveled to Panama for the 2018 COPABE U-18 Pan-American Championships in November and dominated to claim its fifth Pan-American Championships gold medal in a row and its eighth-straight gold medal in international competition dating back to 2011. The team had a historic run to the title, outscoring its opponents 131–27 in nine games while going undefeated. The 131 runs scored are the most an 18U National Team has ever scored in international competition.

Current major leaguers Matt Holliday, Bryce Harper, Clayton Kershaw, Buster Posey, Eric Hosmer, Freddie Freeman, and Justin Upton have all played on the 18U team. The 18U program is the second-oldest of Team USA's constituent programs which began in the late 1980s.

18U National Team Gold Medals
Year	Tournament
2018	COPABE U-18 Pan-American Championships
2017	WBSC U-18 Baseball World Cup
2016	COPABE Pan Am "AAA" Championships
2015	WBSC U-18 Baseball World Cup
2014	COPABE Pan Am "AAA" Championships
2013	IBAF "AAA" World Cup
2012	IBAF "AAA" World Cup
2011	COPABE Pan Am "AAA" Championships
2009	COPABE Pan Am "AAA" Championships
1999	IBA Junior World Cup
1995	Junior World Championships
1989	World Youth Baseball Championships
1988	World Youth Baseball Championships

=== 15U National Team ===
In 2012, USA Baseball rolled out its first 15U national team. The program, composed of some of the most talented young players across the country, played four games in the Dominican Republic against the Dominicans and Puerto Rico. Team USA went 4–0 abroad, outscoring their opponents, 31–3.

In 2013, the 15U team traveled to Barranquilla, Colombia, for the COPABE Pan American "AA" Championships, where it brought home the gold medal for the first time. En route to defeating Cuba, 6–1, in the championship game, the 15U squad amassed a perfect record, finishing 8–0 in the event.

Competing in its first WBSC U-15 Baseball World Cup in 2014, Team USA traveled to Mazatlan, Mexico, and went 9–1 overall and claimed the silver medal. The 2014 campaign also had the 15U national team's Brice Turang bring home the 15U's first USA Baseball Richard W. "Dick" Case Player of the Year award, given to the athlete who is not only an outstanding player on the field, but also exemplified sportsmanship and love of the game.

USA Baseball's national team championships (NTCs), 14U national team development program, and national team identification series (NTIS) help the organization identify players for the 15U national neam. The NTCs are held in Arizona and Florida and up to 72 teams compete in each region. USA Baseball representatives and scouts select the top players from each event to make up the national team.

Starting in 2017, a new trials system was introduced for the 15U program that includes two phases and 72 athletes vying for just 20 spots on Team USA's roster. The pool of talent is then narrowed to 34 players for phase two before the final 20 are named.

Following 2018 trials and training at the National Training Complex, the 15U national team traveled to David, Panama, where it claimed the program's first WBSC U-15 Baseball World Cup gold medal.

15U National Team Gold Medals
Year	Tournament
2018	WBSC U-15 Baseball World Cup
2017	COPABE Pan Am "AA" Championships
2015	COPABE Pan Am "AA" Championships
2013	COPABE Pan Am "AA" Championships
2012	COPABE Pan Am "AA" Championships

=== 12U National Team ===
In 2013, USA Baseball launched its first 12U National Team. The team, which was composed of some of the most talented young players from across the county, traveled to Taipei City, Taiwan, and came home with its first International Baseball Federation 12U World Cup gold medal. After lengthy pool play, the 12U team defeated the hosts, Chinese Taipei, in the World Cup final, 8–1. The game was attended by over 10,000 home fans and was broadcast throughout parts of Asia and online.

The 12U national team is composed of players selected from the NTIS, the 12U National Open through the 12U open development camps and the 11U futures invitational.

In 2015, the 12U national team claimed its second world championship in a row with a 7–2 win over Chinese Taipei in the WBSC U-12 Baseball World Cup. The program then followed that with a silver medal at the 2016 COPABE Pan American "A" Championships. A third consecutive gold medal in the WBSC U-12 Baseball World Cup in 2017 with another 7–2 defeat of Chinese Taipei marked the team's contribution to USA Baseball's 2017 sweep of international competition.

The 12U national team returned to the COPABE U-12 Pan American Championships in 2018, where it claimed its first gold medal in the event. Team USA went undefeated in the event, outscoring its opponents 127-7 and winning all nine of its games by a 13-run average margin.

12U National Team Gold Medals
Year	Tournament
2018	COPABE U-12 Pan American Championships
2017	WBSC U-12 Baseball World Cup
2015	WBSC U-12 Baseball World Cup
2013	IBAF "A" World Cup

=== Women's national team ===
The USA Baseball women's national team was established in 2004 when an 18-player team was chosen following open tryouts across the nation. The team went on to capture the gold medal in the first IBAF Women's Baseball World Cup in Edmonton, Canada. Team USA repeated as IBAF World Cup gold medalists in 2006 in Taiwan, before taking home the bronze medal at the 2008 World Cup in Japan and again in 2010 in Venezuela.

In 2012 and 2014, the women's national team won the silver medal at the WBSC Women's Baseball World Cup in Edmonton, Canada, and Miyazaki, Japan, respectively. The 2015 women's national team competed in the Toronto 2015 Pan American Games and claimed gold, defeating Canada 11–3 to earn the championship.

When not competing in international tournaments, the team hosts a women's national team development program, leads youth clinics, and works to grow the game of baseball among women in the U.S.

The 2018 women's national team was named following the Women's National Open and Women's National Team Trials in June of that year. The 20-woman team competes in the 2018 WBSC Women's Baseball World Cup, which was held in the U.S. for the first time, from August 22–31 at the USSSA Space Coast Complex in Viera, Florida. Team USA finished the World Cup with a 6–3 record with a 1.98 team ERA and a collective .288 average.

Women's National Team Gold Medals
Year	Tournament
2015	XVII Pan American Games
2015	Pan American Games Qualifier
2006	IBAF Women's World Cup
2004	IBAF Women's World Cup

== National Team Development Programs ==
At age levels where international competitions are not held, the national team development program (NTDP) offers an unmatched developmental opportunity to better prepare athletes for potential future national teams and introduce them to the USA Baseball organization. It also serves to help young players grow and prepare for the next steps in their respective baseball careers.

Since the program's inception in 2012, 64 NTDP attendees have earned spots on national team rosters at the 15U, 18U, and collegiate national team levels. Additionally, in the five years that NTDP participants have been eligible, 21 players have been selected in the first five rounds of the MLB First-year Player Draft.

=== 17U NTDP ===
In 2012, USA Baseball fielded its first 17U NTDP. Members of the 17U NTDP are identified through the USA Baseball National Team Championships in Arizona and Florida, as well as the USA Baseball NTIS.

Four members of the 2016 17U NTDP went on to play on the 2017 18U national team that claimed the program's fourth consecutive WBSC U-18 Baseball World Cup gold medal. In 2018, the week-long 17U NTDP was held in Chicago.

American Baseball Coaches Association Hall of Famer Jack Leggett served as the field coordinator for the event in 2018 after coaching in 2017. The head coach at Northwestern University, Spencer Allen, and current University of Texas head coach, David Pierce, joined Leggett on staff and served as the managers for the Stripes team and Stars team, respectively.

Coaches and evaluators assess 40 athletes during the NTDP week; evaluators made up of former professional players, respected collegiate and high-school coaches, and professional scouts.

=== 16U NTDP ===
In 2018, USA Baseball introduced a 16U age level to its NTDP.

The 16U NTDP will feature athletes selected from the 15U NTIS, the newly reinstated 16U national team championships, and through recommendations from professional scouts, USA Baseball task force members, and collegiate, high-school, and youth coaches.

For its inaugural season, the 16U NTDP was led by three-time USA Baseball national team coach and seven-time NTDP field coordinator, Eric Kibler. University of Dayton Head Coach Jayson King joined Kibler on staff as the manager of the Stripes team, while Bill Mosiello, who is currently the associate head coach at Texas Christian University, managed the Stars team.

Coaches and evaluators assess 36 athletes during the NTDP week.

=== 14U NTDP ===
Along with the 17U NTDP, 2012 was the inaugural year for the 14U NTDP. Members of the 14U NTDP are identified through the USA Baseball national team championships in Arizona and Florida and the USA Baseball NTIS.

With the introduction of a new 15U National Team Trials system in 2017, 18 players from the 14U NTDP are selected each year to compete for a national team roster spot in that year's 15U National Team Trials. In 2017, two athletes from the 2017 14U NTDP made the 2017 15U national team through the new system and won gold with Team USA at the COPABE Pan American “AA” Championships.

The 2018 14U NTDP took place at the USA Baseball National Training Complex, July 23–27.

Current St. Thomas Aquinas (Ft. Lauderdale, Fla.) head coach and former 15U national team assistant coach, Troy Cameron, was selected as the 14U NTDP field coordinator. Scott Grove, the head coach at The First Academy (Orlando, Fla.), served as the event's pitching coordinator, while current St. Mary's College head coach, Eric Valenzuela, and current Indiana University head coach, Chris Lemonis, managed the Stars and Stripes teams, respectively.

=== National Training Complex ===
In March 2003, with the area's family-friendly environment, already-rapid growth, and proximity to sports cities Chapel Hill, Durham, Raleigh, and Charlotte, Cary, North Carolina was chosen as the destination for the national governing body of baseball. An agreement was reached with the town to create a complex and headquarters there and the USA Baseball National Training Complex opened in June 2007. The first event held at the facility was the 2007 USA Baseball Tournament of Stars, which served as the primary identification event for the organization's 18U national team from 2007 to 2018.

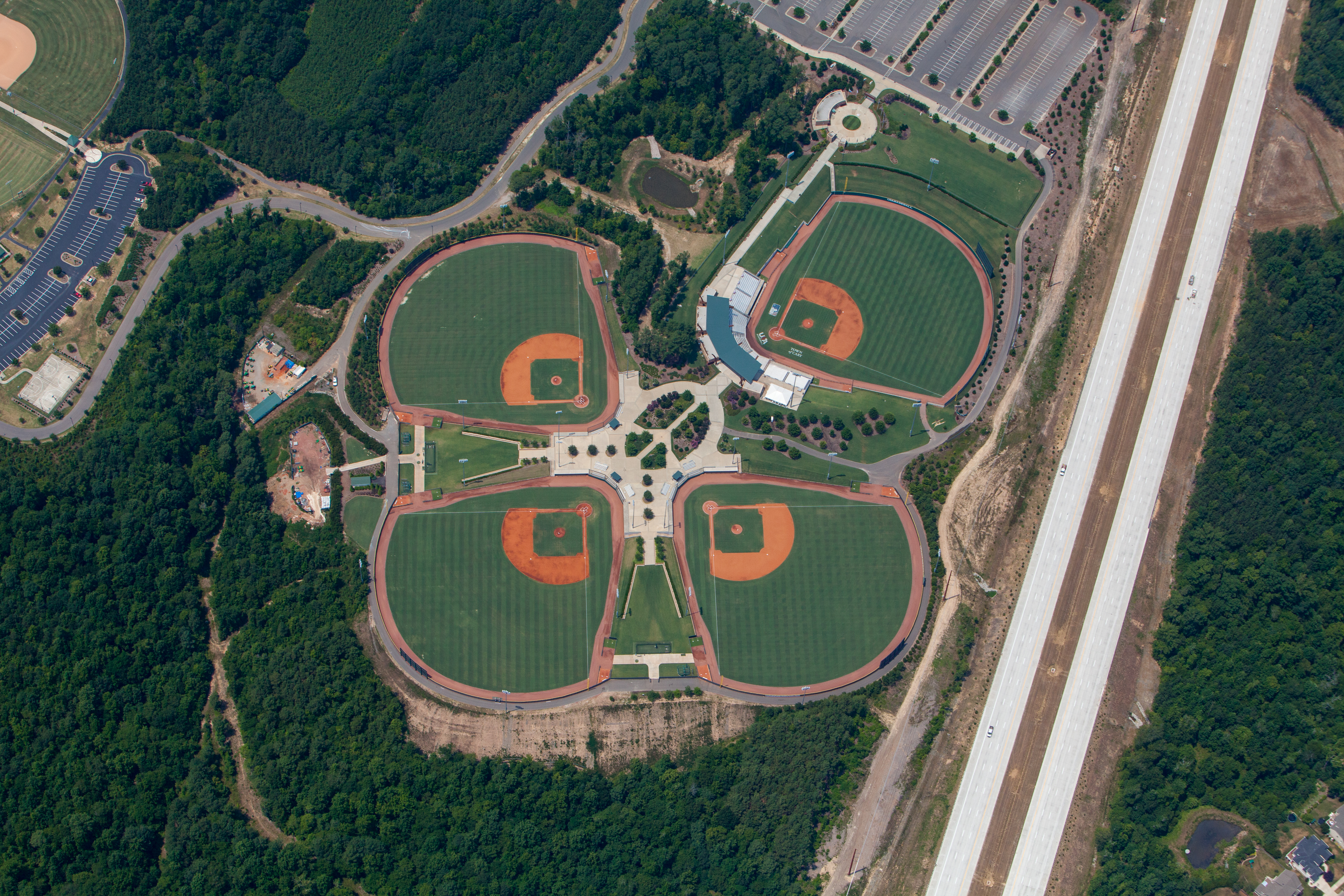
USA Baseball National Training Complex, Cary, North Carolina

The USA Baseball National Training Complex at Thomas Brooks Park in Cary, North Carolina is located within the 221-acre Thomas Brooks Park. The complex includes four baseball fields – a stadium field and three training fields – all with dimensions of 330 feet down the lines and 400 feet in centerfield. All fields are maintained at Major League Baseball standards.

In recognition of more than 30 years of public service and countless accomplishments for the citizens of Cary, the Cary Town Council named the stadium field in honor of former Town Manager William B. Coleman, Jr., upon his retirement on October 17, 2008. Coleman Field has a press box that includes two suites, an official scorer's room, a sound room, and a press row. Spectator seating is for 1,754 people, including handicapped-accessible seating, and additional grass seating for about 250 people. All fields have access to restroom facilities and a concession building.

The National Training Complex (NTC) is also home to the flagship USA Baseball Team Store, which is open during all USA Baseball events at the complex. The NTC was expanded in 2022-2024 with the construction of a brand new national main office for USA Baseball and additional training facilities.

== USA Baseball events ==
=== National High School Invitational ===
Held annually in March, the USA Baseball National High School Invitational (NHSI) co-presented by the Greater Raleigh Sports Alliance and the Town of Cary brings 16 of the top prep teams in the United States to compete in what has become the premiere event on the high-school baseball calendar. Due to the concentration of elite talent at the event, the tournament champion is frequently recognized as the top high school baseball team in the country at the start of the season.

The NHSI, which not only features the top teams in the country, but also some of the best high-school baseball players, is a 16-team, single-elimination championship tournament. Each participating team is guaranteed to play four games. The NHSI presents participating athletes with national exposure in addition to providing the opportunity for the best teams in the country to compete against each other.

In 2012, Mater Dei High School (Santa Ana, Calif.) claimed the inaugural NHSI title in dramatic fashion with a 3–2 walk-off win over Harvard-Westlake (Studio City, Calif.). The 2013 edition of the tournament was once again won by Mater Dei with another defeat of Harvard-Westlake before The First Academy (Orlando, Fla.) took home the trophy in 2014.

In the 2018 NHSI, Orange Lutheran High School (Orange, Calif.) became the second school in NHSI history to defend its title when it secured the 2018 championship with a dominant 9–3 victory over Green Hope High School (Cary, N.C.) in the final. Green Hope went on an historic run en route to its runner-up finish, not only becoming the first North Carolina school to reach the NHSI championship game, but also the first to advance past its opening round game in the event.

USA Baseball NHSI Champions
Year	School
2019	Orange Lutheran High School (Orange, Calif.)
2018	Orange Lutheran High School (Orange, Calif.)
2017	Orange Lutheran High School (Orange, Calif.)
2016	Huntington Beach High School (Huntington Beach, Calif.)
2015	San Clemente (San Clemente, Calif.)
2014	The First Academy (Orlando, Fla.)
2013	Mater Dei High School (Santa Ana, Calif.)
2012	Mater Dei High School (Santa Ana, Calif.)

=== National Team Championships ===
The USA Baseball National Team Championships in Florida and Arizona are the primary identification events for players to be considered for the 15U National Team and the 14U, 16U and 17U National Team Development Programs (NTDP).

The National Team Championships first started in 1997 as the USA Junior Olympic Baseball Championships and was a joint venture between USA Baseball and the United States Olympic Committee. At its inception, the event was a tournament for 16-and-under travel baseball teams that was used to identify talent for the USA Baseball 16U National Team.

When USA Baseball moved from New Jersey to Arizona in 1998, the then-56 team tournament moved out west, as well, where it was contested at the spring training homes of the Colorado Rockies and the Chicago White Sox/Arizona Diamondbacks. With the popularity and size of the event growing exponentially, it was expanded to a second location in 2001, once again including the East Coast with a location in Fort Myers, Florida.

In 2009, the tournament was renamed and expanded once more, this time to include a second age group. Now called the National Team Championships, a 14U division was added to identify talent for the USA Baseball 14U national team. However, when the WBSC changed its international competition age groups from 16U to 15U in 2012, a 15U division was added to the National Team Championships for the new 15U national team, the 16U division was changed to 17U and the 17U and 14U divisions now funneled into the newly created NTDP.

The event, held annually in both Arizona and Florida, USA Baseball provides an opportunity for more than 400 teams to compete against teams from all across the country.

In Florida, the USA Baseball National Team Championships are held in Palm Beach County, Florida, at Roger Dean Stadium, the spring-training home of the St. Louis Cardinals and Miami Marlins, and The Ballpark of the Palm Beaches, the spring-training home of the 2017 World Series Champions Houston Astros and the Washington Nationals.

In Arizona, the USA Baseball National Team Championships are held in Glendale, Goodyear, Peoria, and Surprise, Arizona, at the spring-training homes of the Los Angeles Dodgers, Cleveland Indians, San Diego Padres, Texas Rangers, Cincinnati Reds, Kansas City Royals, and Chicago White Sox.

=== Futures Invitational ===
The USA Baseball 10U and 11U Futures Invitational are elite, invitation-only youth championship events, exclusively reserved for top 10U and 11U teams and athletes. The four-day, championship tournaments will both be hosted at the USA Baseball National Training Complex, the official training site of Team USA and adjoining Thomas Brooks Park and/or Middle Creek Park in Cary, North Carolina. Both the 10U and 11U event will host the best teams from across the country featuring the top youth talent in the nation.

=== National Team Identification Series (NTIS) ===
The USA Baseball National Team Identification Series (NTIS) is the most comprehensive player identification program offered by Team USA. Players from across the country will participate in selection events and tryouts on the regional level with the aim of ultimately being named to their regional team. Those regional teams will then compete in their respective age groups against the 15 other regions from across the country at the culminating National Team Identification Series Champions Cup event at the USA Baseball National Training Complex in Cary, North Carolina, in the fall of 2019.

The program includes six separate men's age groups – 11U, 13U, 14U, 15U, 16U and 17U. From the final 2018 NTIS event, USA Baseball will invite a minimum of 68 players to future National Team Trials, National Team Development Program (NTDP) and Tournament of Stars opportunities with the ultimate goal of being selected to represent our country as a part of Team USA in 2019.

All of the regional teams within each age group will be put together by our various NTIS Regional Directors. These various regional directors will be responsible for identifying and selecting 18-player teams which will participate in the culminating event in Cary, North Carolina.

=== 12U NTIS ===
Held in various locations throughout the country, the 12U NTIS will offer athletes across the U.S. the opportunity to become involved with Team USA, while providing instruction, evaluation and fun. Players from the 12U NTIS will be recommended to USA Baseball officials and, from those recommendations, USA Baseball will invite 128 players to participate in the 12U National Open.

=== Women's National Open ===
The USA Baseball Women's National Open brings together more than 100 of the top female baseball players in the country to compete against each other for the chance to earn a spot on the Women's National Team Trials roster. These players are split into six teams, competing in games and participating in positional workouts while being scouted and evaluated by the Women's National Team staff. Following the conclusion of the event, the 40-woman Women's National Team Trials roster is announced, followed by National Team Trials and Training, as well as the World Baseball Softball (WBSC) Women's Baseball World Cup.

=== USA Baseball Cups ===
The 2019 USA Baseball's 14U and 16U Cups are open-invitation tournaments composed of 32 teams. The 14U and 16U Cups will involve 16 teams each. Each team is guaranteed four games (weather permitting). The events are held in Cary, North Carolina, at the USA Baseball National Training Complex. USA Baseball will award 32 teams the right to participate based on an application approval process.

== Sport Development ==
The USA Baseball Sport Development team aims to grow the game of baseball through youth programs, player development, safety and educational initiatives. The Sport Development website – SportDev.org – houses all USA Baseball's development initiatives, educational resources, certifications and blog material. The website provides free online education courses and resources, development initiatives such as Hit and Run, Fun At Bat and the Prospect Development Pipeline, coach and umpire certification and the Sport Development Blog.

=== MLB/USA Baseball events ===
As part of an ongoing partnership, USA Baseball and Major League Baseball have worked together to create a host of events that contribute to the growth and proliferation of the game of baseball, as well as the identification and growth of young athletes.

==== Breakthrough Series ====
The Breakthrough Series, established in 2008, is a joint effort on behalf of USA Baseball and Major League Baseball. This unique program focuses on developing the player on and off the field through seminars, mentorship, gameplay, scout evaluations, video coverage, and the highest level of instruction all while providing a platform for the players to perform for scouts and collegiate coaches. The events are completely cost free with USA Baseball covering expenses for the players.

Players in the MLB and USA Baseball diversity pipeline, including the Breakthrough Series, Dream Series and Elite Development Invitational may be offered additional development and instructional opportunities throughout the year. Affording participants touch points at different times during the season will allow for consistent growth opportunities both in competitive and non-competitive settings and will aide in the continued advancement of their life and baseball skills.

==== Elite Development Invitational ====
Utilizing the successful Breakthrough Series instructional model incorporating multiple seminars, Major League Baseball, USA Baseball and the Major League Baseball Players Association teamed up to develop the revolutionary Elite Development Invitational.

In 2017, the event welcomed 200 players (ages 12–17) and more than two dozen coaches with a combined 200-plus years of baseball experience to historic Dodgertown in Vero Beach, Florida, for two weeks of intensive instruction.

The wide-ranging group of coaches covered every field position and instructed players in a variety of workouts and game situations throughout the week.

Players in the MLB and USA Baseball diversity pipeline, including the Breakthrough Series and Elite Development Invitational may be offered additional development and instructional opportunities throughout the year. Affording participants touch points at different times during the season will allow for consistent growth opportunities both in competitive and non-competitive settings and will aide in the continued advancement of their life and baseball skills.

Over 30 former professional players including veterans like Jerry Manuel, Maury Wills, Tom Gordon, Lee Smith, Marquis Grissom, and Endy Chavez served as instructors with Commissioner Manfred, Joe Torre, Harold Reynolds, Dusty Baker and Dee Gordon stopping by to share their knowledge and experiences. Facilitating a Spring Training atmosphere for the aspiring professional players, days consisted of individual work, games, situational play, "chalk talk" and nightly seminars about the baseball industry.

==== Trailblazer Series ====
In 2017, USA Baseball and Major League Baseball launched a new baseball tournament for girls, held in the greater Los Angeles area, and built around Jackie Robinson Day Weekend. In 2018, approximately 100 girls, once again, had an unprecedented opportunity to participate in the Trailblazer Series.

==== Dream Series ====
The Dream Series, established in 2017, is operated by Major League Baseball and USA Baseball. This event will host a diverse group of more than 60 high school pitchers and catchers from across the country, in a special development camp atmosphere as well as a showcase for professional scouts and collegiate recruiters.

In addition to the on-field actions, participants will receive daily presentations from former Major Leaguers, scouts, college administrators, umpires and other industry professionals. The focus of these presentations will be to prepare the prospect for the collegiate and professional recruiting processes and offer information about alternative careers within the baseball industry. As in similar development camps, a large contingent of college recruiters and professional scouts are expected to attend and evaluate players who demonstrate potential, but may not have had the opportunity for exposure through other events.

Coaches at this year's Dream Series include Bob Didier, Marvin Freeman, Marquis Grissom, LaTroy Hawkins, Kenny Hill, Charles Johnson, Jerry Manuel, Darren Oliver, Dave Stewart, and Lenny Webster.

=== Online educational resources ===
Education is one of the fundamental building blocks of the game. As such, USA Baseball's educational resources emphasize a culture of development, safety and fun within the sport through free online training courses and programs for players, parents, coaches and umpires. Content is available in both English and Spanish.

=== Mobile Coach ===
The USA Baseball Mobile Coach App, free to all users, features practice plans, unique drills, and video tutorials to assist coaches of all levels to run competent, safe, age and skill appropriate practices for their players.

=== Long-Term Athlete Development Plan (LTAD) ===
USA Baseball, with support from Major League Baseball (MLB), has generated a Long-Term Athlete Development Plan (LTAD) to provide a multi-stage developmental pathway for an individual's lifelong experience within the sport of baseball in the United States. Through developmentally appropriate programs for all ages, the LTAD aims to increase participation, aid in performance, and enhance enjoyment across the sport of baseball. The LTAD plan is a culmination of evidence-based information from the principal contributor group and input from a leadership group consisting of experts from the medical safety industry, MLB league and club executives, and an advisory group inclusive of leaders from across the baseball spectrum.

=== High school baseball manual ===
The high school baseball program manual has been developed to support the thousands of dedicated high school coaches around the country in their quest to provide a positive, development-based experience to their student-athletes.

=== Prospect Development Pipeline (PDP) ===
The Prospect Development Pipeline (PDP) is a collaborative effort between Major League Baseball (MLB) and USA Baseball. The program established an official identification and player assessment pathway for elite high school age baseball players in the United States to all 30 MLB Clubs for the draft.

=== Play Ball ===
Play Ball is a collaborative initiative between Major League Baseball and USA Baseball that highlights the many ways baseball can be played, including ways outside of traditionally organized baseball leagues and tournaments. Events hosted around the country provide an opportunity for youth to experience the game in a variety of different forms in a non-competitive environment.

=== Pitch Smart ===
Pitch Smart is a joint initiative by Major League Baseball and USA Baseball that provides a series of practical, age-appropriate guidelines to help parents, players and coaches avoid overuse injuries and foster long, healthy careers for youth pitchers.

=== Fun At Bat ===
Fun At Bat is an entry-level bat and ball program for kids with an emphasis on character development, functional movement, active play, and fun. The initiative stems from meticulous research on introductory youth sport programs and is supported by Major League Baseball, USA Baseball and industry professionals.

=== Baseball5 ===
Baseball5 is being promoted as an accessible variation of baseball. USA Baseball offers Baseball5 equipment in conjunction with GameMaster Athletic.

=== Hit and Run Baseball ===
Hit and Run Baseball is a joint initiative between Major League Baseball and USA Baseball that provides guidelines for fun, new ways to engage youth baseball players in formal competitive play. The program serves youth leagues, tournament providers and amateur coaches by providing game modification recommendations focused on pace of play and additional skill building opportunities for athletes that are designed to occur more frequently than traditional gameplay exposure.

=== Coach and umpire certification ===
Utilizing USA Baseball's educational content and achieving certification allows coaches to stay current with developments in the modern game of baseball. The organization offers educational resources and certification programs for coaches at different levels, including recreational youth teams and national teams. Certification pathways are also available for umpires.

=== Baseball ACE ===
Baseball ACE is an educational program for any and all individuals who are currently coaching baseball or aspire to coach at any level of the game. Offered in partnership by USA Baseball and the American Baseball Coaches Association (ABCA), this program aims to create a culture of continuing education, professional development and mentorship within the baseball coaching community.

== USABat ==
USA Baseball, the national governing body for the sport of baseball in the U.S., in conjunction with participating national member organizations has adopted a new method for measuring bat performance in the testing of youth bats. Informed by the research of leading scientists on the USA Baseball Bat Study Committee, and supported by its National Member Organizations, — including the American Amateur Baseball Congress (AABC), Babe Ruth Baseball/Cal Ripken Baseball, Dixie Youth Baseball & Dixie Boys Baseball, Little League Baseball and PONY Baseball — USA Baseball has concluded that recent advancements in science, engineering, technology, and the materials available to fabricate non-wood bats, now allow the manufacturers to construct youth bats that can perform at a wood-like level through the entire range of lengths and weights of youth bats.

The new USA Baseball bat standard (USABat), which applies to bats that are classified below the NCAA and NFHS level of play, will be implemented on January 1, 2018, allowing the bat manufacturers sufficient time to bring these bats to the marketplace.

Similar to the NCAA and NFHS BBCOR standard, which helped to eliminate discrepancies with different length bats and thus provide a more direct measure of bat performance, the USA Baseball bat standard will allow youth baseball organizations in the United States to reach their goal of establishing a wood-like standard, a standard that will provide for the long-term integrity of the game.

== Golden Spikes Award ==
Since 1978, USA Baseball has honored the top amateur baseball player in the nation with the Golden Spikes Award. The award is presented in partnership with the Rod Dedeaux Foundation and is given each year to the player who best exhibits exceptional on-field ability and exemplary sportsmanship.

In 2018, California's Andrew Vaughn won the award on ESPN's SportsCenter. Following the nationally televised announcement of the winner, the finalists and their families were celebrated at the Jonathan Club Los Angeles as part of the 2018 Rod Dedeaux Foundation Awards Dinner.

In 2020, USA Baseball announced that it would forego naming a Golden Spikes Award winner given the canceled 2020 college baseball season due to the COVID-19 pandemic.

Golden Spikes Award Winners
Year	Player	Position	School
2025	Wehiwa Aloy	Infielder	Arkansas
2024	Charlie Condon	Infielder/Outfielder	Georgia
2023	Dylan Crews	Outfielder	LSU
2022	Ivan Melendez	Infielder	Texas
2021	Kevin Kopps	Pitcher	Arkansas
2020	not awarded		
2019	Adley Rutschman	Catcher	Oregon State
2018	Andrew Vaughn	Infielder	California
2017	Brendan McKay	Pitcher/First Baseman	Louisville
2016	Kyle Lewis	Outfielder	Mercer
2015	Andrew Benintendi	Outfielder	Arkansas
2014	A.J. Reed	Infielder/Pitcher	Kentucky
2013	Kris Bryant	Infielder	San Diego
2012	Mike Zunino	Catcher	Florida
2011	Trevor Bauer	Pitcher	UCLA
2010	Bryce Harper	Catcher/Outfielder/Infielder	Southern Nevada
2009	Stephen Strasburg	Pitcher	San Diego State
2008	Buster Posey	Catcher	Florida State
2007	David Price	Pitcher	Vanderbilt
2006	Tim Lincecum	Pitcher	Washington
2005	Alex Gordon	Third Baseman	Nebraska
2004	Jered Weaver	Pitcher	Long Beach State
2003	Rickie Weeks Jr.	Second Baseman	Southern
2002	Khalil Greene	Shortstop	Clemson
2001	Mark Prior	Pitcher	Southern California
2000	Kip Bouknight	Pitcher	South Carolina
1999	Jason Jennings	Pitcher	Baylor
1998	Pat Burrell	Third Baseman	Miami
1997	J.D. Drew	Outfielder	Florida State
1996	Travis Lee	First Baseman	San Diego State
1995	Mark Kotsay	Outfielder	Cal State Fullerton
1994	Jason Varitek	Catcher	Georgia Tech
1993	Darren Dreifort	Pitcher	Wichita State
1992	Phil Nevin	Third Baseman	Cal State Fullerton
1991	Mike Kelly	Outfielder	Arizona State
1990	Alex Fernandez	Pitcher	Miami Dade Community College
1989	Ben McDonald	Pitcher	LSU
1988	Robin Ventura	Third Baseman	Oklahoma State
1987	Jim Abbott	Pitcher	Michigan
1986	Mike Loynd	Pitcher	Florida State
1985	Will Clark	First Baseman	Mississippi State
1984	Oddibe McDowell	Outfielder	Arizona State
1983	Dave Magadan	First Baseman	Alabama
1982	Augie Schmidt	Shortstop	New Orleans
1981	Mike Fuentes	Outfielder	Florida State
1980	Terry Francona	Outfielder	Arizona
1979	Tim Wallach	First Baseman	Cal State Fullerton
1978	Bob Horner	Third Baseman	Arizona State

== Organizational awards ==
Every year, USA Baseball recognizes the top National Team coach, developmental coach, volunteer coach, player, performance and team from the past season with its organizational awards. In addition, in years when USA Baseball fields a Women's National Team, the organization also recognizes the top female athlete of that year. The awards and past winners are as follows:

=== USA Baseball Rod Dedeaux Coach of the Year Award ===
Presented annually in conjunction with the U.S. Olympic Committee and the Rod Dedeaux Foundation, the USA Baseball Rod Dedeaux Coach of the Year award is given to the National Team manager or coach who expects excellence out of his players. A coach who not only strives for his players to succeed but to become better human beings as well. The award was first presented in 1996.

Rod Dedeaux Coach of the Year Award Winners
Year	Coach	Team
2025	Rick Eckstein	18U National Team and Women's National Team development program
2024	Rick Eckstein	18U National Team and Premier12 Team
2023	Mark DeRosa	World Baseball Classic Team
2022	Denny Hocking	18U National Team
2021	Mike Scioscia	U.S. Olympic Baseball Team
2020	none awarded	
2019	Veronica Alvarez	Women's National Team
2018	Paul Mainieri	Collegiate National Team
2017	Jim Leyland	World Baseball Classic Team
2016	George Horton	Collegiate National Team
2015	Willie Randolph	Premier12 Team
2014	Andy Stankiewicz	18U National Team
2013	Rob Cooper	18U National Team
2012	Scott Brosius	18U National Team
2011	Scott Brosius	18U National Team
2010	Eric Kibler	16U National Team
2009	Eddie Rodriguez	World Cup Team
2008	Rob Walton	Collegiate National Team
2007	Davey Johnson	World Cup Team
2006	Davey Johnson	Olympic Qualifying Team
2005	Davey Johnson	Pre-Olympic Qualifying Team
2004	Marty Scott	Women's National Team
2003	Ray Tanner	Collegiate National Team
2002	Lelo Prado	Collegiate National Team
2001	Pat McMahon	Collegiate National Team
2000	Mike Gillespie	Collegiate National Team
2000	Tommy Lasorda	U.S. Olympic Baseball Team
1999	Mark Johnson	Collegiate National Team
1998	Ron Polk	Collegiate National Team
1997	Bob Milano	Collegiate National Team
1996	Skip Bertman	Collegiate National Team and U.S. Olympic Baseball Team

=== USA Baseball Developmental Coach of the Year Award ===
Presented annually in conjunction with the U.S. Olympic Committee, the USA Baseball Developmental Coach of the Year Award is given to the manager or coach who most prepares his players for the next level of baseball and as well as their future outside of the sport. The award was first presented in 1996.

Developmental Coach of the Year Award Winners
Year	Coach	Team
2025	Casey Scott	15U National Team
2024	Bryan Madsen	12U National Team
2023	Rob Shabansky	15U National Team
2022	Drew Briese	15U National Team
2021	Jason Maxwell	18U National Team
2020	None awarded	
2019	Troy Cameron	15U National Team
2018	Jason Maxwell	15U National Team
2017	David Sharp	12U National Team
2016	Glenn Cecchini	18U National Team
2015	Tanner Vesely	12U National Team
2014	Jonathan Pollard	Women's National Team
2013	Dave Webb	12U National Team
2012	Eric Kibler	14U and 17U National Team Development Programs
2011	Jeff Hewitt	14U National Team
2010	Bill Kinneberg	Collegiate National Team
2009	George Sanchez	16U National Team
2008	Mark Elkins	18U National Team
2007	Gary Hatch	16U National Team
2006	Garye LaFevers	16U National Team
2005	Phil Bodine	16U National Team
2004	Frank Cruz	Collegiate National Team
2003	Don Freeman	16U National Team
2002	Edgar Soto	18U National Team
2001	Dave Grant	18U National Team
2000	Tim Saunders	16U National Team
1999	Bill Krejci	16U National Team
1998	Mark McKenzie	16U National Team
1997	Bill Olson	18U National Team
1996	Phil Clark	18U National Team

=== USA Baseball Volunteer Coach of the Year Award ===
Presented on a year-by-year basis in conjunction with the U.S. Olympic Committee, the USA Baseball Volunteer Coach of the Year Award is given to the coach who does not receive payment in any form for his or her involvement in assisting USA Baseball with coaching and growing the game of baseball at any level.

Volunteer Coach of the Year Award Winners
Year	Coach	Team
2018	Karsten Whitson	14U National Team Development Program
2017	Bill Burniston	Collegiate National Team
2016	Skip Schumaker	14U National Team Development Program
2015	Todd Greene	14U National Team Development Program
2014	Brad Wilkerson	Multiple programs
2013	Landon Powell	14U National Team Development Program
2012	Eric Kibler	14U and 17U National Team Development Programs
2011	Jeff Hewitt	14U National Team
2010	Bill Kinneberg	Collegiate National Team
2009	George Sanchez	16U National Team
2008	Mark Elkins	18U National Team
2007	Gary Hatch	16U National Team
2006	Garye LaFevers	16U National Team
2005	Phil Bodine	16U National Team
2004	Frank Cruz	Collegiate National Team
2003	Don Freeman	16U National Team

=== USA Baseball Player of the Year/Richard W. "Dick" Case Award ===
From 1984 to 2002, the USA Baseball Player of Year Award was given to the athlete who was not only an outstanding player on the field, but also exemplified sportsmanship and love of the game as well. Beginning in 2003, the award was renamed the Richard W. “Dick” Case Award in honor of the organization's founding Executive Director/CEO.

Player of the Year/Richard W. "Dick" Case Award Winners
Year	Player	Team
2025	Coleman Borthwick	18U National Team
2024	Kayson Cunningham	18U National Team
2023	Trea Turner	World Baseball Classic Team
2023	Tyler Early	12U National Team
2022	Bryce Eldridge	18U National Team
2021	Tyler Austin	U.S. Olympic Team
2020	not awarded	
2019	Robert Hassell III	18U National Team
2018	Adley Rutschman	Collegiate National Team
2017	Triston Casas	18U National Team
2016	Ricky Tyler Thomas	Collegiate National Team
2015	Justyn-Henry Malloy	15U National Team
2014	Brice Turang	15U National Team
2013	Carlos Rodón	Collegiate National Team
2012	Reese McGuire	18U National Team
2011	Albert Almora	18U National Team
2010	Alex Bregman	16U National Team
2009	Justin Smoak	World Cup Team
2008	Stephen Strasburg	Collegiate National Team and U.S. Olympic Team
2007	Jayson Nix	World Cup Team
2006	J.P. Arencibia	Collegiate National Team
2005	Ryan Zimmerman	Collegiate National Team
2004	Ryan Shealy	Pre-Olympic Qualifying Team
2003	Huston Street	Collegiate National Team
2002	Michael Aubrey	Collegiate National Team
2001	Orlando Hudson	World Cup Team
2000	Ben Sheets	U.S. Olympic Team
1999	Dan Wheeler	Pan American Games Team
1998	Pat Burrell	Golden Spikes Award Winner
1997	J.D. Drew	Golden Spikes Award Winner
1996	Travis Lee	Collegiate National Team and U.S. Olympic Team
1995	Mark Kotsay	Golden Spikes Award Winner
1994	Jason Varitek	Golden Spikes Award Winner
1993	Darren Dreifort	Golden Spikes Award Winner
1992	Phil Nevin	Collegiate National Team and U.S. Olympic Team
1991	Mike Kelly	Golden Spikes Award Winner
1990	Alex Fernandez	Golden Spikes Award Winner
1989	Ben McDonald	Golden Spikes Award Winner
1988	Robin Ventura	Collegiate National Team and U.S. Olympic Team
1987	Jim Abbott	Collegiate National Team and Pan American Games Team
1986	Mike Loynd	Golden Spikes Award Winner
1985	Will Clark	Golden Spikes Award Winner
1984	Oddibe McDowell	Collegiate National Team and U.S. Olympic Team

=== USA Baseball International Performance of the Year Award ===
The USA Baseball International Performance of the Year Award recognizes the athlete who authors the greatest single-game performance on an international stage while wearing the Team USA uniform in a given year. The annual award was first presented in 2009.

International Performance of the Year Award Winners
Year	Player(s)	Team	Performance
2025	Coleman Borthwick	18U National Team	Threw a complete game shutout against Japan in the U-18 Baseball World Cup
2024	Casey Lawrence	Premier12 Team	Pitched six shutout innings and struck out seven batters against Venezuela to earn the win and bronze medal
2023	Charlie Condon	Collegiate National Team	Walk-off two-run single to secure five-game sweep in 20th USA vs. Chinese Taipei International Friendly Series
2022	Christian Rodriguez	18U National Team	Struck out seven in five shutout relief innings to help beat Japan and clinch a spot in U-18 Baseball World Cup title game
2021	Todd Frazier	Olympic Qualifying Team	4-for-4 with two-run home run in victory over Venezuela to clinch a Tokyo 2020 Olympic Games berth
2020	not awarded		
2019	Alec Burleson		Walk-off solo home run in Game 2 of the USA vs. Japan Collegiate All-Star Series
2018	Bobby Witt Jr.	18U National Team	Hit for a natural cycle in the U-18 Pan-American Championships gold medal game
2017	Josh Atomanczyk	12U National Team	W, 5 1/3 IP, 4 H, 1 ER, 7 K, 2-for-3, 2 R, 2 HR, 5 RBI
2017	Marcus Stroman	World Baseball Classic Team	W, 6 1/3 IP, 1 H, 3 K in World Baseball Classic Final
2016	Hans Crouse	18U National Team	W, 7 IP, 1 H, 0 ER, 3 BB, 11 K
2015	Ryan Hendrix, Tanner Houck, Chris Okey, and A. J. Puk	Collegiate National Team	Combined to no-hit Cuba for the first time in its history
2014	James Kaprielian	Collegiate National Team	W, 6 IP, 2 H, 0 ER, 0 BB, 12 K
2013	Brady Aiken	18U National Team	W, 7 IP, 5 H, 1 ER, 2 BB, 10 K
2012	Jonathon Crawford	Collegiate National Team	W, 6.1 IP, 4 H, 2 ER, 2 BB, 6 K
2011	Keegan Thompson	16U National Team	W, 9 IP, 4 H, 0 ER, 1 BB, 12K, 4-for-5, 1 R, 1 2B, 2 RBI
2010	Chris Archer	Professional National Team	W, 6 IP, 2 H, 0 ER, 0 BB, 10 K against Cuba
2009	Jameson Taillon	18U National Team	W, 7.2 IP, 4 H, 0 ER, 1 BB, 16 K (U.S. U-18 Pan-American single-game record)

=== USA Baseball Sportswoman of the Year Award ===
The USA Baseball Sportswoman of the Year Award is presented in years when the organization fields a Women's National Team to the top female athlete who was not only an outstanding player on the field, but also exemplified sportsmanship and love of the game.

Sportswoman of the Year Award Winners
Year	Player	Team
2024	Meggie Meidlinger	Women's National Team
2023	Alex Hugo	Women's National Team
2022	Kelsie Whitmore	Women's National Team
2019	Alex Hugo	Women's National Team
2018	Megan Baltzell	Women's National Team
2016	Tamara Holmes	Women's National Team
2015	Malaika Underwood	Women's Pan American Team
2014	Sarah Hudek	Women's National Team
2012	Tamara Holmes	Women's National Team
2010	Jenna Marston	Women's National Team
2006	Donna Mills	Women's National Team
2004	Laura Brenneman	Women's National Team

=== USA Baseball Team of the Year Awards ===
Finally, the USA Baseball Team of the Year is one whose success reaches far beyond the medal it wins. It is a team that teaches the game of baseball wherever it goes while embodying the ideals, standards and principles of USA Baseball and Team USA. The annual award was first presented in 1996.

Team of the Year Award Winners
Year	Team
2025	12U National Team
2024	18U National Team
2023	12U National Team
2022	12U National Team
2021	Olympic Team
2020	Not awarded
2019	Women's National Team
2018	15U National Team
2017	World Baseball Classic Team
2016	Collegiate National Team
2015	Women's National Team
2014	18U National Team
2013	18U National Team
2012	18U National Team
2011	16U National Team
2010	16U National Team
2009	Professional National Team
2008	Collegiate National Team
2007	Professional National Team
2006	Professional National Team
2005	Professional National Team
2004	Collegiate National Team
2003	Collegiate National Team
2002	Collegiate National Team
2001	16U National Team
2000	Olympic Team
1999	Professional National Team
1998	16U National Team
1997	18U National Team
1996	U.S. Olympic Team

== Member organizations ==
- Amateur Athletic Union (AAU)
- American Amateur Baseball Congress (AABC)
- American Baseball Coaches Association (ABCA)
- American Legion Baseball
- Babe Ruth Baseball
- Baseball Players Association (BPA)
- Dixie Baseball
- Little League Baseball
- National Amateur Baseball Federation
- National Association of Intercollegiate Athletics (NAIA)
- National Association of Police Athletic Leagues
- National Baseball Congress (NBC)
- National Club Baseball Association (NCBA)
- National Collegiate Athletic Association (NCAA)
- National Federation of State High School Associations (NFHS)
- National High School Baseball Coaches Association
- National Junior College Athletic Association (NJCAA)
- PONY Baseball
- T-BALL USA
- United States Specialty Sports Association (USSSA)
- World Baseball Classic (WBC)
- YMCAs of the USA

== See also ==
- American Women's Baseball Federation
- Baseball in the United States
- Baseball awards#U.S. amateur baseball
- Baseball awards#U.S. college baseball
- Baseball awards#U.S. high-school baseball
- Baseball awards#U.S. youth baseball
- USOC Athlete of the Year (2000 Team of the Year: USA Baseball Olympic team)
