= American Women's Baseball Federation =

Non-profit amateur sports organization

American Women's Baseball Federation (AWBF) is a 501(c)(3) tax-exempt non-profit amateur sports organization formed to organize and promote baseball as a mainstream and lifetime opportunity for women.

The AWBF was founded to help women's baseball teams around the country network through its website and the tournaments it has organized. The AWBF is an assumed name for the American Women's Baseball League. Its National Championship Tournament is hosted in Huntingburg, Indiana and featured Donna Mills in 2009. Julie Croteau and her former Colorado Silver Bullets teammates have also been affiliated with the organization.

Since 1992 the AWBF has organized 17 regional and national tournaments. With international partner Women's Baseball Association of Japan (WBAJ) it organized the first four Women's World Series events. National teams met in Canada (2001), United States (2002), Australia (2003), and Japan (2004) to play for international bragging rights. The Women's World Series events were the precursors to the Women's World Cup of Baseball. The Women's World Cup of Baseball started in 2004 in Edmonton and involved most of the same teams that participated in the 2004 Women's World Series. The Women's World Cup of Baseball is now the top elite women's baseball tournament in the world. The Women's World Series is no longer played.

The AWBF now keeps a database of players interested in trying out for the USA Baseball women's national team. Interested players are directed to tryout sites and their names are sent to USA Baseball which holds tryouts and select a women's national team each year.

Jim Glennie is the Founder of the AWBF and served as Director of Player Identification for the USA Baseball Women's National Team and started the foundation after his daughter started playing baseball.

== See also ==
- Women's baseball
- Women's Baseball World Cup
