= David J. Jackson =

American political scientist

Academic background
- Education: Wayne State University

Academic work
- Discipline: Political science
- Institutions: Bowling Green State University (1998–present)
- Main interests: Research on celebrity influence in U.S. politics

David James Jackson is an American political scientist. A professor at Bowling Green State University in Ohio, Jackson's research focuses on the influence of celebrities on U.S. politics.

== Education and career ==
Jackson holds a Bachelor of Arts from the University of Detroit, a Master of Arts from Bowling Green State University (BGSU), and a Ph.D. from Wayne State University. While completing his dissertation on the influence of entertainment media on the political values of young people in the United States, he returned to BGSU in 1998 and was appointed associate professor in 2006 and full professor in 2015.

== Research ==
Jackson's research has focused on the effects of celebrity endorsements on North American politics. His first book, Entertainment and Politics: The Influence of Pop Culture on Young Adult Political Socialization, was based on his dissertation and received reviews in The Journal of Politics, Political Science Quarterly, and Political Communication. His second book, Classrooms and Barrooms, the result of a Fulbright fellowship for teaching at the University of Łódź, explored perceptions of working class Poles of themselves and the United States.

Jackson's early research found that celebrity endorsements made unpopular statements less unpalatable to survey participants and increased participants' agreement with opinions already considered popular. Young people in particular were more likely to agree with a position endorsed by a celebrity, although the celebrity's credibility and the alignment between the celebrity and the issue affected public opinion.

However, when applied to U.S. elections, later research by Jackson found that many celebrity endorsements can have a net negative effect. According to a summary in The Atlantic of a 2015 survey conducted by Jackson, "[i]n almost all the cases, the net effect of any particular endorsement on a sample of the general electorate was negative—voters were less likely to support the endorsed candidate. But the effect often switched to positive when you just focused on demographics already favorable to any given celebrity." Summarizing this research in a 2016 Plain Dealer op-ed, Jackson wrote that "celebrities can be just as divisive as anyone else engaged in the political process today. Seekers of office should deploy celebrity support strategically." Local celebrities in particular have levels of credibility that can influence races, "at least in a small way," he told the Detroit News.

Jackson has also found that celebrity endorsements rarely have "game-changing effects," telling The Tennessean that Taylor Swift's endorsement of Phil Bredesen for U.S. Senate in 2018 might have pushed some young fans to vote for him but that the net effect is "always going to be on the margins."

In the aftermath of The Apprentice star Donald Trump's election as president, Jackson noted that Trump had "created a new pathway to the presidency, from celebrity culture right to the Oval Office," which he said undermined Republican efforts to say that celebrities should stay out of politics. Axios and Variety have cited Jackson's research in reporting on celebrity pursuit of elected office, including Caitlyn Jenner's run for California governor, Matthew McConaughey's consideration of a run for governor of Texas and Kanye West's discussion of a presidential bid.

== Awards ==
In 2007, Jackson received a Fulbright fellowship to teach at the University of Łódź in Poland. Jackson was granted a professorship of service excellence by BGSU in 2019 in recognition of his public engagement and his service as president of the American Association of University Professors chapter at BGSU.

== Bibliography ==
=== Books ===
- Jackson, David J. (2002). Entertainment & Politics The Influence of Pop Culture on Young Adult Political Socialization. New York: Peter Lang. ISBN 9780820457468.
- Jackson, David J. (2009). Classrooms and Barrooms: An American in Poland. Lanham, Maryland: Hamilton Books. ISBN 9780761843832.

=== Select articles ===
- Jackson, David J.; Darrow, Thomas I. A. (July 2005). "The Influence of Celebrity Endorsements on Young Adults' Political Opinions". Harvard International Journal of Press/Politics. 10 (3): 80–98. doi:10.1177/1081180X05279278.
- Jackson, David J. (2008). "Selling Politics: The Impact of Celebrities' Political Beliefs on Young Americans". Journal of Political Marketing. 6 (4): 67–83. doi:10.1300/J199v06n04_04.
- Jackson, David J. (2018). "The Effects of Celebrity Endorsements of Ideas and Presidential Candidates". Journal of Political Marketing. 17 (4): 301–321. doi:10.1080/15377857.2018.1501530.
