= Kristen O'Shea =

American politician (born 1992)

Member of the Kansas Senate from the 18th district
- In office January 11, 2021 – January 13, 2025
- Preceded by: Vic Miller
- Succeeded by: Kenny Titus

Personal details
- Born: July 10, 1992 (age 34)
- Party: Republican
- Spouse: Gabriel O'Shea
- Education: University of Missouri; Kansas State University
- Occupation: Consultant, business owner

Kristen Brunkow O'Shea (born July 10, 1992) is an American politician who served as a Republican member of the Kansas Senate from the 18th district. She assumed office in 2021. Her district was anchored in northern Topeka, and also includes the cities of Silver Lake, Rossvile, St. Marys and Wamego. She did not seek re-election in 2024, withdrawing after being the only person to file for the seat.
