= Wayne Minshew =

American journalist & baseball player (1936–2015)

Lamar Wayne Minshew (June 9, 1936 – April 29, 2015) was a journalist and minor league baseball player.

== Biography ==
Born in Cherokee County, Alabama, Minshew attended Model High School and then the State University of West Georgia, before enrolling at University of Georgia. He set the school's record for lowest earned run average in a season in 1957, when he posted a mark of 1.02. He played professionally for the Wytheville Cardinals and Hobbs Cardinals in the St. Louis Cardinals system in 1958 and briefly reappeared with the Jacksonville Jets in 1961.

He then embarked on his career as a journalist. From 1959 to 1965, he wrote for The Americus Times and the Jacksonville Journal before embarking on a career with the Atlanta Constitution in 1966. He became the Atlanta Braves' first beat writer and also contributed to The Sporting News. He later became the Braves' director of public relations.

Wayne Minshew has a whole chapter devoted to him in the book, "Keepers of the Game: When the Baseball Beat was the Best Job on the Paper" which celebrates the last generation of baseball writers whose careers were rooted in Teletype machines, train travel, and ten-team leagues. Wayne traveled with the Atlanta Braves while writing for the Atlanta newspaper.
