= Billy Henderson (coach) =

American football player and coach (1928–2018)

William "Billy" Henderson
- Born: June 2, 1928 (age 98)
- Education: University of Georgia

William Henderson (2 June 1928 – 14 February 2018) was an American football player and coach. Henderson had coached for Furman University, the University of South Carolina, and four high schools. Henderson was a native of Georgia, graduated from high school in Macon, and was an alumnus of the University of Georgia (UGA). At UGA, Henderson was on the football and baseball teams.

== Early life ==
Henderson was the youngest of 4 children of the late Holly Bradford Henderson and Mina Jewell Henderson. His father died when Henderson was 8 years old. This left his mother a widow who had to do everything on her own. She did not have any money, but she never let her children know that. “We thought we were wealthy and had everything we needed,” said Henderson. Coach Henderson had a strong passion for baseball. He and his buddies would walk three miles down from his house to watch minor league baseball games. Because he did not have the money to get in the game, he had to wait until a ball was hit over the fence, race to get it, return the ball, and then get free admission. “That’s where I learned to run fast,” said Henderson.

Henderson's athletic ability was discovered on the dusty sand lots of Macon, Georgia. During his high school athletic career, he was twice named All-American player for both football and baseball. In his entire four years of high school, he earned fourteen letters in football, basketball, baseball, and track. Henderson was drafted by the Chicago Cubs after his senior year of high school, but he chose to sign a football scholarship with the Georgia Bulldogs. There he was an All-SEC performer.

== Coaching career ==
Henderson received his first head coaching job at Willingham High School in Macon as an athletic director and coach of varsity baseball and football. His first season there, he was building the program and went winless in football. Henderson was determined to better the program and came up with something called McWill Night. These nights were intended to promote fitness in the community. This program was open to any athlete that wanted to better him or herself, not just his or her players. He recruited people like Gov. Jimmy Carter, Lester Maddox, Carl Sanders, and Vince Dooley to ensure his program would be successful. The event was held in the Macon Coliseum and consisted of more than 2,000 participants and 6,350 spectators. Billy drew national coverage from the Sunday newspaper in Macon. Coach Henderson also started a gymnastics team, became the head of summer recreation programs, and volunteered for programs such as Big Brothers, Boy Scouts, and the YMCA.

During this time period integration was approaching and Henderson was already preparing for it. When this change came about he hired a man named Don Richardson, from one of the black schools, to be the head basketball coach. Henderson decided that he made the right move because the basketball team won six state titles and a national championship in 1978. Richardson was not the only one to be successful because Hendersons's baseball team also won the state title in 1969.

The school board decided to make some changes in the school policy making it acceptable for students to attend Central High School and join the ROTC program. This angered Henderson because he felt that he was being cheated out of athletes and his school did not have an ROTC program. After twelve years of nurturing this high school's athletic program, he changed schools. He received a job at Mount de Sales Academy, a Catholic school, where he was assistant football and won two state baseball championships. There he was named the National High School Baseball Coach of the year. This was the second time a Georgia high school coach had been named national coach of the year for any sport.

After all of his successes he moved to Athens, Georgia to coach at Clarke Central High School. His biggest sacrifice was not being able to coach his son who was the quarterback at Mount de Sales in Macon. Coach Henderson was still able to keep up with his son and attend several playoff games. By 1974, Henderson led the Clarke Central Gladiators to a 5-4-1 record.

The Clarke Central Gladiators lost the first four games of the 1975 season, scoring only 6 points while allowing 121 points against them. Henderson told his team that their performances were not acceptable and they were going to have practice that next morning at 7 a.m. “I suggested they stay home because I was going to try to kill them,” says Henderson. As the next week came Henderson and the Gladiators shocked the undefeated and fourth ranked Dunwoody, 14–7. Not to mention this game was their first victory of the season. This team worked very hard and won the sub-region championship.

By the 1977 season, his team had outscored their opponents 211-25 heading into the first round of the playoffs. This was when Henderson won his first state title game as a head coach against Valdosta 16-14 following a tragic summer death of one of his players. Winning became a ritual. The 1978 team finished 9-2 and the 1979 team finished undefeated, 15–0. When this season was over, Henderson was offered a job at Georgia Tech, but rejected it. Henderson had lost interest in coaching college ball. After all of these successes, the Gladiators were expected to do a lot. Anything less than a state championship would have meant that the Gladiators had failed.

== Assistant coaching career ==
Henderson was a part of two state title games as an assistant coach at Mount de Sales, two baseball titles at Mount de Sales, and a swimming title at Athens High, Clarke Central before integration. Henderson had previously coached at Furman University and University of South Carolina and Jefferson (Ga.) High School. Coach Henderson won his first state championship in 1977 against Valdosta, who was led by quarterback Buck Belue.

Prior to retirement, Coach Henderson had been invited by Aubrey Hammack to appear on several television shows that were produced by Cox Cable in Macon and it was during that time that the first book was begun.

In May 2011, Aubrey Hammack published the book, The Winning Edge Lessons From Billy Henderson, which was well received. Hammack was a 1963 graduate of Willingham High School in Macon. Hammack had started assisting Johnny Reynolds of Athens, GA in writing the first book but at that time it was not completed.

== Retirement ==
By the end of the 1995 season, losing in the quarterfinals, Henderson did not realize that it would be his last high school game at the age of sixty-five retiring before the 1996 season due to illness. In September 1996, the football stadium at Clarke Central was named Billy Henderson Stadium in his honor. Later that year, he joined the YMCA staff as a director of the youth football program. Henderson went out to elementary schools giving pep talks trying to encourage kids to play football. It was his goal to stay active within the community. The following year, the YMCA's enrollment had tripled. In 1998, Henderson was not yet ready to retire from the game, and he wanted to return to coaching even though his health was declining. Henderson accepted a head coaching job at Central-Macon, but later turned it down.

Henderson founded the Athens Athletic Hall of Fame in 2000 and the Champions Foundation. These organizations were established to provide summer day camps and sports camps, to help high school athletes find scholarships, and to promote sportsmanship. The Hall of Fame first inducted an African American male named Pleas Starks, a longtime water boy for UGA. Henderson remains one of the most recognizable names and faces in Athens. Until his death, Henderson kept in touch with his players. One player told Henderson he wanted to thank him for teaching him how to shake a hand properly and to look someone in the eyes while talking to them. “Next to my parents, he has been the most influential person in my life,” said Tate Grizzle, a former player. “Here is a man who wakes up every day not thinking about what he can do for himself, but what he can do for others,” said Obey Dupree. Billy has paid overdue electricity bills for one of his player's family, loaned his car to a player to visit his dad in Atlanta for Thanksgiving, and even bailed one of his players out of jail. Coach Henderson allowed one of his football players, who was having some difficulties, to move in with his family at Willingham. In the 60s according to Aubrey Hammack in his book, The Winning Edge Lessons From Billy Henderson 2011.,

== Coaching record ==
Coach Henderson's final record with Clarke Central alone was 222-65-1 and he had an overall record of 285-107-15 which made him one of the most successful coaches in Georgia high school history. Henderson received the Atlanta Falcons Lifetime Achievement Award. He made eighteen straight playoff appearances and ended his head coaching career with three state football championships, three baseball championships, and one swimming championship.

== Personal life and death ==
Henderson had three daughters and two sons with his wife of 63 years, Frances “Fosky” (née West, 1927–2010). A son, Brad, died in 1964 and a grandson, Zachary, in 2011.

Henderson died at his home in Athens, Georgia on 14 February 2018 of cancer, at the age of 89.
