= Kenny Titus =

American politician

Member of the Kansas Senate from the 18th district
- Incumbent
- Assumed office January 13, 2025
- Preceded by: Kristen O'Shea

Member of the Kansas House of Representatives from the 51st district
- In office January 9, 2023 – January 13, 2025
- Preceded by: Ron Highland
- Succeeded by: Megan Steele

Personal details
- Party: Republican

Kenny Titus is an American politician. He served as a member of the Kansas House of Representatives from 2023 to 2025, representing the 51st district, then was elected to represent the 18th district in the Kansas Senate in 2024. He is a member of the Republican Party.
