= David Jackson (footballer, born 1958) =

English footballer

Personal information
- Full name: David Patrick Jackson
- Date of birth: 16 September 1958
- Place of birth: Wibsey, England
- Date of death: August 2009 (aged 50)
- Place of death: Bradford, England
- Position: Forward

Youth career
- 1975–1978: Manchester United

Senior career*
Years	Team	Apps	(Gls)
1978–1979	Bradford City	12	(3)
- Exeter City
- * Club domestic league appearances and goals

David Patrick Jackson (16 September 1958 – August 2009) was an English professional footballer who played as a forward.

== Career ==
Born in Wibsey, Jackson signed for Bradford City in July 1978 from Manchester United, leaving the club in May 1979. During his time with Bradford City he made 12 appearances in the Football League, scoring three goals He also made one appearance in the FA Cup. He also played for Exeter City.

== Sources ==
- Frost, Terry (1988). Bradford City A Complete Record 1903-1988. Breedon Books Sport. ISBN 0-907969-38-0.
