= David Jackson (art historian) =

British art historian

David Jackson (born 1958) is professor of Russian and Scandinavian art histories at the University of Leeds. He is a specialist in the art of Ilya Repin on whom he wrote his PhD thesis.

== Selected publications ==
- Nordic Art. The Modern Breakthrough 1860–1920. Hirmer Verlag, Munich, 2012. ISBN 978-3777470818
- The Peredvizhniki Pioneers of Russian Painting. Nationalmuseum, Stockholm, 2011. ISBN 978-9171008312
- Christen Købke: Danish Master of Light. Yale University Press, 2010. ISBN 978-0300166637
- Akseli Gallen-Kallela: The Spirit of Finland. NAI, Netherlands, 2006. (With P. Wageman)
- The Russian vision: the art of Ilya Repin. BAI, Schoten. 2006
- Akseli Gallen-Kallela: the spirit of Finland. Groninger Museum, 2006. (With P. Wageman)
- The Wanderers and critical realism in nineteenth-century Russian art. Manchester University Press, Manchester, 2006.
- Het Russische Landschap. BAI Schoten, 2003. Exhibition catalogue. (With P. Wageman)
- Russian landscape. BAI, Schoten, 2003. Exhibition catalogue. (With P. Wageman)
