= Rich Poythress =

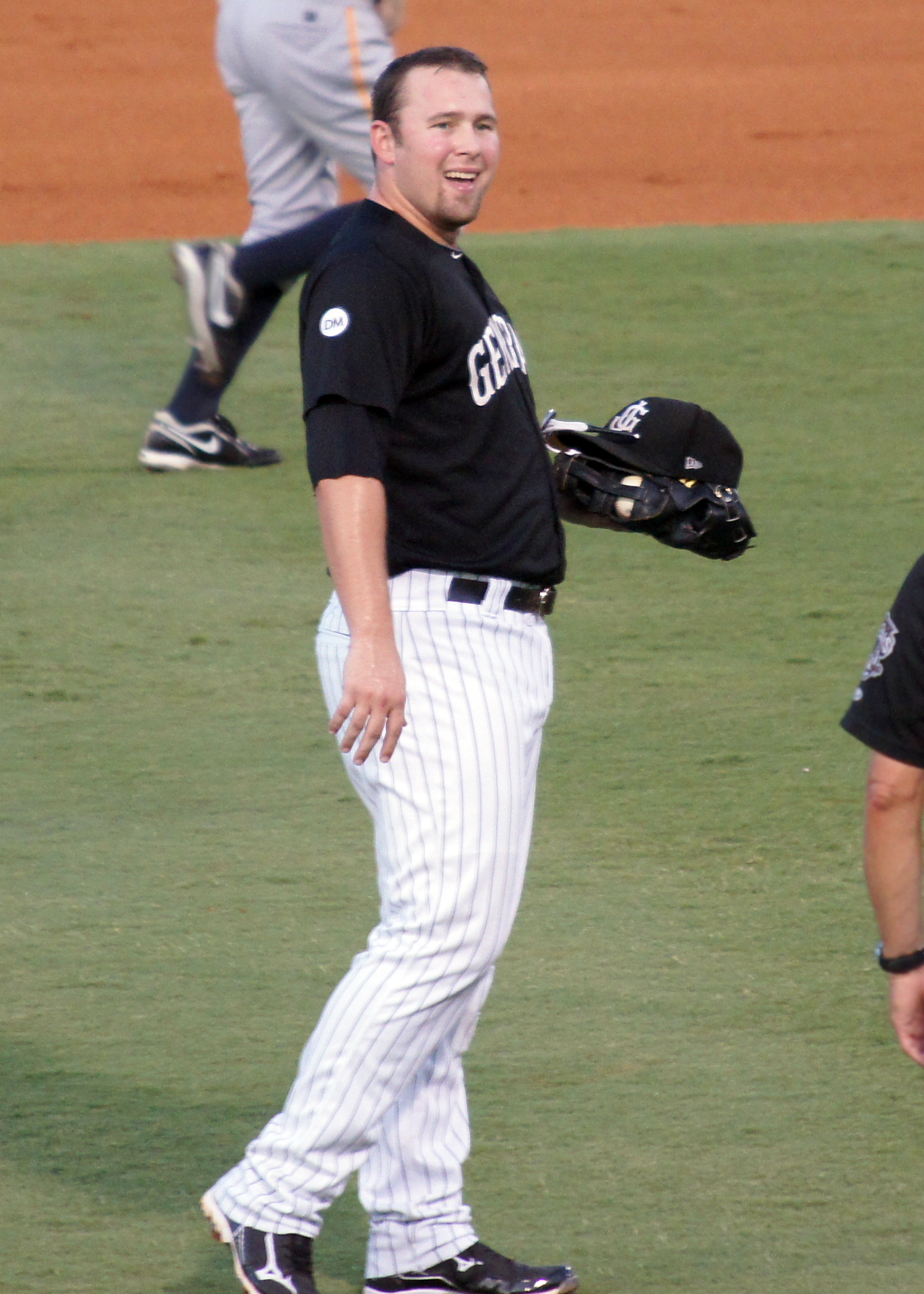

Free agent
- First basemen
- Born: August 11, 1987 (age 38); Grovetown, Georgia
- Bats: Right Throws: Right
- Stats at Baseball Reference

Rich Poythress (born August 11, 1987) is an American former professional baseball first basemen. He was drafted by the Seattle Mariners in the second round of the 2009 Major League Baseball draft.

== College career ==
Poythress attended Greenbrier High School where he was a four-year varsity starter. As a junior, he hit .544 with 13 home runs. He also played for the Savannah Chain summer team.

Poythress attended the University of Georgia where as a freshman he appeared in 45 games, 38 starts. He batted .282 with three home runs and 24 RBIs. He recovered from a torn ACL before the season.

Poythress played started 69 games with the Bulldogs in his sophomore season. He helped the team become the Southeastern Conference champions and helped them in the College World Series. He batted .374 with 15 home runs and 75 RBIs. He started all six College World Series games and hit .409 with three doubles and eight RBIs. Poythress set a school-record with 55 assists at first base and was named to the SEC All-Defensive Team. After the 2008 season, he played collegiate summer baseball with the Orleans Cardinals of the Cape Cod Baseball League and was named a league all-star.

In his junior season Poythress started all of the Bulldog's 62 games. His .376 average with 25 home runs and 86 RBIs were a team lead. His RBIs were an all-time single-season record at the school. He was named to the First Team All-SEC and SEC All-Defensive Team as well as a Louisville Slugger All-American. He was named as a semi-finalist for the Dick Howser Trophy. During the season, he was named SEC player of the Week and a Louisville Slugger National Player of the Week after helping the Bulldogs to a sweep over the University of Tennessee.

== Professional career ==
Poythress was drafted by the Seattle Mariners in the second round of the 2009 Major League Baseball draft. The Mariners signed him on July 29, 2009. He began his professional career with the Rookie-Level Peoria Mariners of the Arizona League. He hit .300 with one home runs and six RBIs in six games with Peoria. He was promoted to the Double-A West Tenn Diamond Jaxx of the Southern League on August 9. With the Diamond Jaxx he hit .230 with two doubles, one home run and nine RBIs in 26 games. In 2010, Poythress was assigned to the Class-A Advanced High Desert Mavericks of the California League. He played in the Mariners organization until 2013 without reaching the majors.

Poythress signed a minor league deal with the Miami Marlins in April 2014. He then signed a minor league deal with the Atlanta Braves in July 2014.

Poythress was said to have very good power and that is his standout tool. It was also said that he has below average speed, an average throwing arm and was compared to players like Ryan Shealy and Matt LeCroy. Before the 2009 draft, he was named as the number 12 prospect by ESPN.com.
