= Chris Stowers =

American baseball player (born 1974)

- Outfielder
- Born: August 18, 1974; St. Louis, Missouri, U.S.
- Batted: Left Threw: Left

MLB debut
- July 10, 1999, for the Montreal Expos

Last MLB appearance
- July 16, 1999, for the Montreal Expos

MLB statistics
- Games played: 4
- At bats: 2
- Hits: 0
- Stats at Baseball Reference

Teams
- Montreal Expos (1999)

Christopher James Stowers (born August 18, 1974) is an American former professional baseball outfielder and graduated from The Terry College of Business at the University of Georgia. Stowers was a Freshman All-American and All SEC player. He is considered among the best outfielders in UGA history and played in Major League Baseball (MLB) for the Montreal Expos in 1999.
