= Charlie Condon (baseball) =

American baseball player (born 2003)

Colorado Rockies
- First baseman / Outfielder
- Born: April 14, 2003 (age 23); Atlanta, Georgia, U.S.
- Bats: Right Throws: Right

Career highlights and awards
- Golden Spikes Award (2024); Dick Howser Trophy (2024)

Charles Merrill Condon (born April 14, 2003) is an American professional baseball first baseman and outfielder in the Colorado Rockies organization. He played college baseball for the Georgia Bulldogs. The Rockies selected Condon third overall in the 2024 Major League Baseball draft.

== Amateur career ==
Condon attended The Walker School in Marietta, Georgia. As a senior, he hit .432 with a 1.310 OPS and broke the Georgia HS all-time home-run record. A multi-sport athlete, Condon was also his team's starting quarterback his final three years of high school.

After redshirting his first year at the University of Georgia in 2022, Condon played collegiate summer baseball with the St. Cloud Rox of the Northwoods League. In 2023, he started all 56 games he played in for Georgia, hitting .386/.484/.800 with 25 home runs and 67 runs batted in (RBI). He was named the Baseball America Freshman of the Year and the Freshman Hitter of the Year by the National Collegiate Baseball Writers Association (NCBWA). During the summer after the season, he played for the United States collegiate national team, and again played summer ball, this time with the Falmouth Commodores of the Cape Cod Baseball League.

Condon entered his redshirt sophomore season in 2024 as a top prospect for the 2024 Major League Baseball draft.

During the 2024 season, Condon broke the NCAA BBCOR home run record with 37 total on the season. He led the nation in both home runs and batting average and was awarded the Dick Howser Trophy, SEC Player of the Year, and the Golden Spikes Award. Heading into the 2024 MLB draft, Condon was a consensus top-5 prospect and ranked as the number one prospect by several publications.

== Professional career ==
On July 14, 2024, Condon was selected by the Colorado Rockies third overall in the 2024 Major League Baseball draft. Upon signing, he received a $9.25 million signing bonus, tying fellow 2024 draftee Chase Burns for the largest signing bonus in MLB history. Condon made his professional debut with the High-A Spokane Indians, hitting .180/.248/.270 with one home run, 11 RBI, and four stolen bases across 25 appearances.

On March 14, 2025, Condon was ruled out for six weeks after suffering a non-displaced fracture in his left wrist. Upon returning, he played in 35 games for Spokane, slashing .312/.431/.420 with three home runs and 17 RBI. On June 29, Condon was promoted to the Double-A Hartford Yard Goats. He played in 55 games with Hartford and hit .235 with 11 home runs and 38 RBI. After the season, he played in the Arizona Fall League with the Salt River Rafters. Condon was assigned to the Triple-A Albuquerque Isotopes to open the 2026 season.

== Personal life ==
Condon grew up an Atlanta Braves fan.
