= Kansas's 18th Senate district =

American legislative district

Kansas's 18th State Senate district
Senator
| Kenny Titus; R–Topeka |
- Demographics: 81% White; 5% Black; 9% Hispanic; 1% Asian; 1% Native American; 3% Other
- Population (2018): 70,478

Kansas's 18th Senate district is one of 40 districts in the Kansas Senate. It has been represented by Republican Kenny Titus since January 13, 2025. Previous senators include Democrat Vic Miller and Governor Laura Kelly.

== Geography ==
District 18 is based in northern Topeka, also stretching west to Silver Lake, Rossville, St. Marys, and Wamego. It covers parts of Pottawatomie, Shawnee, and Wabaunsee Counties.

The district overlaps with Kansas's 1st and 2nd congressional districts, and with the 47th, 50th, 51st, 52nd, 53rd, 55th, 57th, 58th, and 61st districts of the Kansas House of Representatives.

== Recent election results ==
=== 2020 ===
2020 Kansas Senate election, District 18
Primary election
| Party | Candidate | Votes | % |
|---|---|---|---|
| Democratic | Tobias Schlingensiepen | 2,599 | 52.9 |
| Democratic | Joe Cheray | 1,378 | 28.0 |
| Democratic | H. Dean Zajic | 940 | 19.1 |
| Total votes | | 4,917 | 100 |
General election
| Republican | Kristen O'Shea | 19,396 | 59.2 |
| Democratic | Tobias Schlingensiepen | 13,364 | 40.8 |
| Total votes | | 32,760 | 100 |
| Republican gain from Democratic | | | |

=== 2016 ===
2016 Kansas Senate election, District 18
| Party | Candidate | Votes | % |
|---|---|---|---|
| Democratic | Laura Kelly (incumbent) | 15,007 | 51.6 |
| Republican | Dave Jackson | 14,076 | 48.4 |
| Total votes | | 29,083 | 100 |
| Democratic hold | | | |

=== 2012 ===
2012 Kansas Senate election, District 18
Primary election
| Party | Candidate | Votes | % |
|---|---|---|---|
| Republican | Dick Barta | 5,093 | 76.0 |
| Republican | Cristina Fischer | 855 | 12.8 |
| Republican | Gary Parnell | 756 | 11.3 |
| Total votes | | 6,704 | 100 |
General election
| Democratic | Laura Kelly (incumbent) | 14,813 | 51.7 |
| Republican | Dick Barta | 13,833 | 48.3 |
| Total votes | | 28,646 | 100 |
| Democratic hold | | | |

=== Federal and statewide results ===
| Year | Office | Results |
|---|---|---|
| 2020 | President | Trump 54.3 – 43.1% |
| 2018 | Governor | Kelly 52.9 – 38.9% |
| 2016 | President | Trump 53.4 – 39.7% |
| 2012 | President | Romney 52.4 – 44.7% |
