= Great Britain women's national baseball team =

National women's baseball team representing the United Kingdom

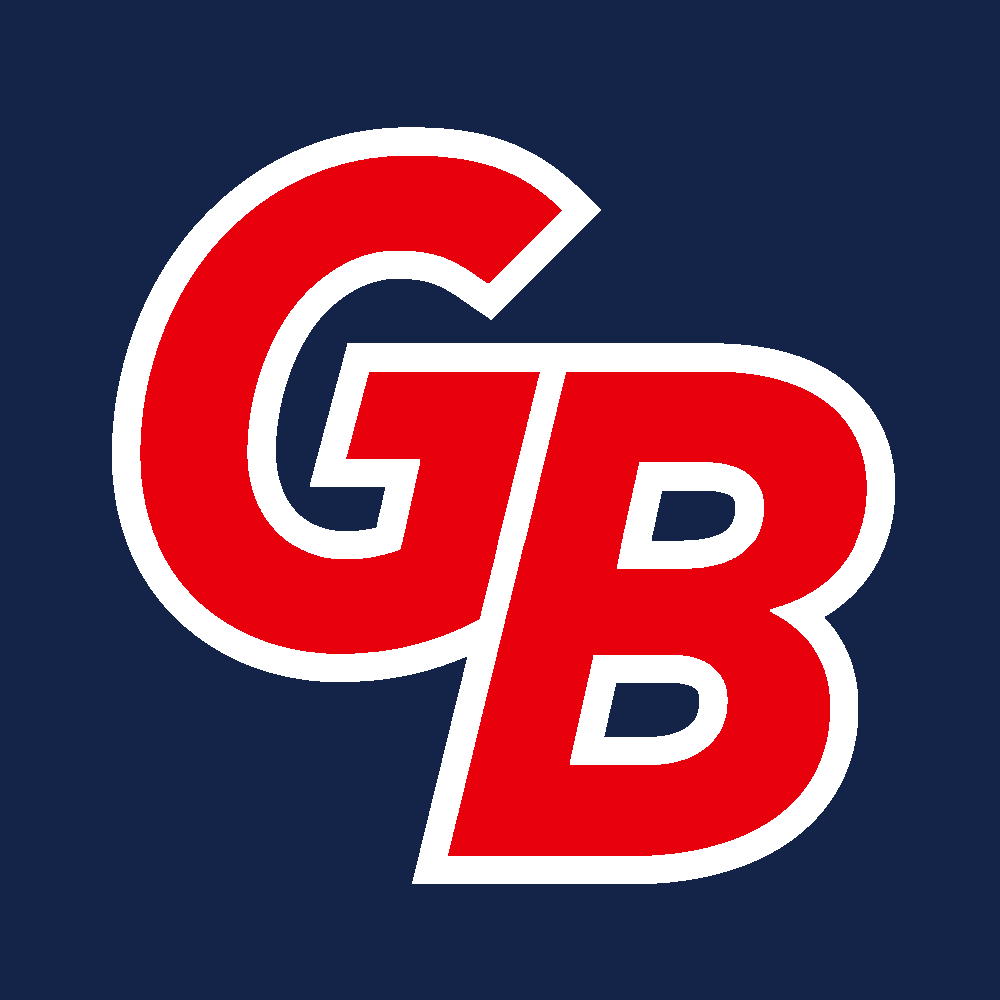

Information
- Country: United Kingdom
- Federation: British Baseball Federation
- Confederation: Confederation of European Baseball

WBSC ranking
- Current: 15 (9 September 2026)
- Highest: 15 (as of December 2025)

Uniforms
| Home | Away |

Olympic Games
- Appearances: 0

European Championship
- Appearances: 2 (first in 2022)
- Best result: (gold) 1st (1 time, in 2025)

Women's World Cup
- Appearances: 0

Key results
First international
- Great Britain 27–10 Czech Republic; Greg Hamilton Baseball Park, France; 3 August 2022

Biggest win
- Great Britain 27–10 Czech Republic; Greg Hamilton Baseball Park, France; 3 August 2022

Biggest loss
- Netherlands 12–2 Great Britain; Greg Hamilton Baseball Park, France; 4 August 2022

The Great Britain women's national baseball team is the national women's baseball team of the United Kingdom. It is governed by the British Baseball Federation, and is also a member nation of the Confederation of European Baseball.

== Background ==
Women's baseball in the United Kingdom emerged as early as 1929 in London among local women workers. By 1931, multiple teams, including the Kodak Hawkeye of London and another from Cardiff, were playing against each other. In Yorkshire, women's baseball became so popular that by 1937, a formal league had formed, dominated by the Hull Nomads until World War II. Locals watched North American military personnel, such as the women from the all Black 6888th Central Postal Directory Battalion stationed at Birmingham, play; despite this, post-war revival efforts failed. Women continued to play in coed leagues until the organization Women's Baseball UK (WB-UK) created the first women's domestic league in the UK in 80 years. In 2020, the British Baseball Federation established the Great Britain women's national baseball team.

== National team formation and controversy ==
Baseball in the United Kingdom has a long history, and a well established men's senior representative side, but it was not until 2020 that a women's side was established by the British Baseball Federation. Amanda ‘Doris’ Hocking, who had spearheaded the formation of Women's Baseball UK, the body that created the first women's domestic league in the United Kingdom for 80 years, was appointed as the first General Manager.

However, in April 2021 Hocking resigned in protest over a tweet made by the British Baseball Federation's Twitter account, which was widely perceived to have sexualised women in baseball. Amongst those who supported Hocking for her stance was men's senior team Manager, Drew Spencer. The President of the British Baseball Federation, Gerry Perez, was forced to resign, after a week of defending the tweet and refusing to remove it.

=== First international tournament ===
In preparation for their international debut at the Women's European Baseball Championship Sheffield Bruins women's team Head Coach, Josh Taylor, was appointed as Pitching Coach and Fiona Brambley was appointed as team Trainer, to travel out to France with the squad. The team's debut international championship got off to an explosive start, with the women piling on the runs in a commanding victory over the Czech Republic, on the first day of the competition. Laura Hirai scored six runs in the game. Dora Lau and Gabriella Sassoli both crossed the plate four times. Sassoli also collected four RBI. During the tournament catcher Marianna Casal placed emphasis on the importance of the team making its international debut, hoping to inspire other girls and women to take up baseball in the United Kingdom, by leading her team in the European Championship. She said "Even if we do come back in fourth, we will have been the first women in Great Britain to go a baseball Euros. That is an achievement, we are making history."

== Notable figures ==
Elizabeth Stride, known professionally as Lizzie Arlington. Stride was born to English parents in the United States, in 1877, and was the first woman to play for a professional men's team.

Laura Hirai was the first ever batter for the senior women's team, scoring the first run. Hirai was also the first ever Ball Girl in New York Yankees history, at the 2019 MLB London Series. Hirai is the first woman to represent both the Great Britain Baseball Youth National teams (U16 and U18) and the Great Britain Baseball Women's Senior National Team, and also play for the Great Britain Softball Women's Senior National team.

== Coaching staff ==
| Name | Position |
|---|---|
| (United Kingdom) Pietro Sollecito | Head coach / Lead Manager |
| (United Kingdom) John Baxendale | Operations Manager |
| (United Kingdom) Gaetano Cristiano | Bench Coach |
| (United Kingdom) Erick Henson | Third Base Coach, Hitting Coach |
| (United Kingdom) Hsinyen Lai | Infield Coach |
| (United Kingdom) Emma McClean | Bullpen Coach |
| (United Kingdom) Wes Ng | Physical Trainer |
| (United Kingdom) Lorenzo Pieri | Pitching Coach |
| (United Kingdom) Alex Pike | Catching Coach |

== Results and fixtures ==
Legend

Win Lose Void or postponed Fixture

=== 2022 ===
| 2022 Women's European Baseball Championship group stage | 5 August | Great Britain (United Kingdom) | 12–13 | France | Greg Hamilton Baseball Park, France |
| 2022 Women's European Baseball Championship group stage | 16:00 | LP: Dora Lau | Boxscore | WP: Coralie Guillemin | Attendance: 200; Umpires: Ondrej Benes |

| 2022 Women's European Baseball Championship group stage | 4 August | Netherlands | 12–2 (F/5) | (United Kingdom) Great Britain | Greg Hamilton Baseball Park, France |
| 2022 Women's European Baseball Championship group stage | 10:00 | WP: Ciska Antoinette Maria Welboren | Boxscore | LP: Laura Hirai | Attendance: 200; Umpires: Ondrej Benes |

| 2022 Women's European Baseball Championship group stage | 3 August | Great Britain (United Kingdom) | 27–10 (F/5) | Czech Republic | Greg Hamilton Baseball Park, France |
| 2022 Women's European Baseball Championship group stage | 11:00 | WP: Oona Ylinen | Boxscore | LP: Karolína Blažková | Attendance: 80; Umpires: François-Xavier Chaffois |

== Record by team ==
| Team | Stats | | | | |
| Team | GP | W | L | RS | RA |
|---|---|---|---|---|---|
| Czech Republic | 3 | 2 | 1 | 48 | 32 |
| France | 2 | 1 | 1 | 28 | 14 |
| Netherlands | 2 | 1 | 1 | 12 | 21 |
| Total | 7 | 4 | 3 | 88 | 67 |

== Tournament records ==
=== World Cup ===
Great Britain have yet to qualify for the Women's Baseball World Cup, the most recent tournament was scheduled to take place in Monterrey, Mexico in 2020 but was postponed until 2021 then cancelled due to covid. The finals of the next tournament are scheduled to take place in 2024, in Thunder Bay, Canada.

Women's Baseball World Cup record
| Year | Host | Round | Position | W | L | RS | RA |
|---|---|---|---|---|---|---|---|
| 2004 | (Canada) | Did not enter | | | | | |
| 2006 | (Taiwan) | Did not enter | | | | | |
| 2008 | (Japan) | Did not enter | | | | | |
| 2010 | (Venezuela) | Did not enter | | | | | |
| 2012 | (Canada) | Did not enter | | | | | |
| 2014 | (Japan) | Did not enter | | | | | |
| 2016 | (South Korea) | Did not enter | | | | | |
| 2018 | (United States) | Did not enter | | | | | |
| 2020 | (Mexico) | Did not enter | | | | | |
| 2024 | (Canada) | To be decided | | | | | |
| Total | 0/9 | - | - | 0 | 0 | 0 | 0 |

=== European Baseball Championship ===
Great Britain were not formed in time to compete at the 2019 2019 Women's European Baseball Championship, in Rouen, France, and were therefore not eligible to qualify for the 2020 Women's Baseball World Cup.

The 2022 Women's European Baseball Championship was held on Wednesday, 3 August to Saturday, 6 August 2022 in Montpellier in France, with France as defending champions. Once again the championships also served as qualifying event for the next Baseball World Cup. Great Britain, in their first ever international tournament, finished 4th and therefore did not qualify for the Baseball World Cup.

Women's European Baseball Championship
| Year | Position | Pld | W | L | RS | RA |
|---|---|---|---|---|---|---|
| (France) 2019 | Did not enter | | | | | |
| (France) 2022 | 4th | 3 | 1 | 2 | 41 | 35 |
| Total | - | 3 | 1 | 2 | 41 | 35 |

== Current roster ==
The team's most recent roster, for the 2025 Women's European Baseball Championship.

Great Britain roster – 2025 Women's European Baseball Championship
| Players | | Coaches |
| Pitchers: 18 Laura Bailes; 45 Chereen Harrocks; 7 Laura Hirai; 2 Gabriella Sassoli; 17 Claury Rashel Scatliffe; 74 Jess Vernon; 13 Oona Ylinen | Catchers: 6 Caitlin Frank; 8 Artie Herbert; 25 Emma McLean; 5 Stella Veski; Infielders: 33 Kat Golik; 23 Ella Henson; 7 Laura Hirai; 22 Darier Minika Malone; 25 Emma McLean; 9 Natasha Romoff; 2 Gabriella Sassoli; 15 Sophie Willis; 13 Oona Ylinen; Outfielders: 18 Laura Bailes; 14 Bethany Casson; 19 Saskia Davies; 12 Lhiez Dela Paz; 4 Samiya Rahman; 2 Gabriella Sassoli; 17 Claury Rashel Scatliffe; 74 Jess Vernon; 15 Sophie Willis; 13 Oona Ylinen | Manager: 32 Pietro Sollecito; Coaches: 10 Dani Briggs; 21 Gaetano Cristiano; 30 Erick Henson; 31 Lorenzo Pieri; 34 Alexander Joseph Pike |
