= 2025 Women's European Baseball Championship =

Tournament details
- Country: Czech Republic
- City: Hluboká nad Vltavou
- Dates: 14 August – 17 August
- Teams: 4
- Defending champions: France

Final positions
- Champions: Great Britain (1st title)
- Runners-up: Czech Republic
- Third place: France
- Fourth place: Netherlands

Tournament statistics
- Games played: 7
- Best BA: (United Kingdom) Natasha Romoff (.800)
- Most SBs: (United Kingdom) Laura Hirai (United Kingdom) Claury Scatliffe (5)
- Best ERA: (Czech Republic) Tereza Stejspalová (2.23)

Awards
- MVP: (United Kingdom) Dariér Malone

The 2025 Women's European Baseball Championship was an international women's baseball tournament held in Hluboká nad Vltavou, Czech Republic from 14 to 17 August 2025. WBSC Europe organized the event. Great Britain, competing in its second tournament, won its first championship. It was the first European championship held outside France and not won by the French team. The British defeated the host and previously undefeated Czech Republic team in the championship match. Dariér Malone of Great Britain was named the tournament most valuable player.

== Teams ==
Four teams competed in the 2025 championship.

Team	Previous best finish
Czech Republic (host)	(silver) 2022 Women's European Baseball Championship
France	(gold) 2019 and 2022 Women's European Baseball Championship
Great Britain	Fourth, 2022 Women's European Baseball Championship
Netherlands	(silver) 2019 Women's European Baseball Championship

== Round robin ==
Pos	Team	Pld	W	L	RF	RA	PCT	GB	Qualification
1	Czech Republic (H)	3	3	0	34	18	1.000	—	Final
2	Great Britain	3	2	1	38	25	.667	1	Final
3	France	3	1	2	19	28	.333	2	
4	Netherlands	3	0	3	14	34	.000	3	

Source: WBSC Europe
(H) Hosts

Date	Local time	Road team	Score	Home team	Inn.	Venue	Game duration	Attendance	Boxscore
Aug 14, 2025	14:00	Great Britain	16–1	France	F/5	Hluboká Baseball & Softball Club	2:20	60	Boxscore
Aug 14, 2025	18:00	Netherlands	1–11	Czech Republic	F/5	Hluboká Baseball & Softball Club	2:11	90	Boxscore
Aug 15, 2025	14:00	France	13–4	Netherlands		Hluboká Baseball & Softball Club	2:58	75	Boxscore
Aug 15, 2025	18:00	Great Britain	12–15	Czech Republic		Hluboká Baseball & Softball Club	3:41	215	Boxscore
Aug 17, 2025	9:30	Netherlands	9–10	Great Britain		Hluboká Baseball & Softball Club	2:59	93	Boxscore
Aug 17, 2025	13:00	Czech Republic	8–5	France		Hluboká Baseball & Softball Club	2:17	140	Boxscore

== Final ==
Date	Local time	Road team	Score	Home team	Inn.	Venue	Game duration	Attendance	Boxscore
Aug 17, 2025	17:00	Great Britain	9–7	Czech Republic		Hluboká Baseball & Softball Club	2:42	250	Boxscore

== Final standings ==
#	Team	Record	
1st place, gold medalist(s)	Great Britain	3–1	Qualifies for Women's World Cup
2nd place, silver medalist(s)	Czech Republic	3–1	
3rd place, bronze medalist(s)	France	1–2	
	Netherlands	0–3	

== Awards and statistical leaders ==
=== Awards ===
- Most valuable player: (United Kingdom) Dariér Malone
- Best hitter: (Czech Republic) Tereza Stejspalová
- Best pitcher: (United Kingdom) Claury Scatliffe

=== Batting ===
- Batting average: (United Kingdom) Natasha Romoff, .800
- Stolen bases: (United Kingdom) Laura Hirai and Claury Scatliffe, 5

=== Pitching ===
- Best earned run average: (Czech Republic) Tereza Stejspalová, 2.23
