= Jaida Lee =

Canadian professional baseball player (born 2006)

New York Heights – No. 7
- Pitcher
- Born: Jaida Marie Maclaren Lee; January 1, 2006 (age 20)
- Bats: Right Throws: Right

WPBL debut
- August 1, 2026, for the New York Heights

WPBL statistics (through August 29, 2026)
- Win–loss record: 3-1
- Earned run average: 5.71
- Strikeouts: 23
- Stats at Baseball Reference

Teams
- New York Heights (2026–present)
Medals
Women's baseball
Representing Canada
Women's Baseball World Cup
Bronze medal – third place	2024 Canada	Team

Jaida Marie Maclaren Lee (born January 1, 2006) is a Canadian professional baseball player. She is currently a pitcher for the New York Heights of the Women's Pro Baseball League. She plays for the Canadian women's national baseball team in international competitions. In 2022, at age 16, she became the first female to compete in men’s baseball at the Canada Summer Games.

== Early life ==
Lee was raised in St. John's, Newfoundland and Labrador, by Dave and Amanda Lee. She has two older brothers. Lee started playing baseball at 6 years old, and has been playing on boy's and men's baseball teams since the age of 10. She attended Gonzaga High School in St. John's.

== Career ==
=== Early career ===
Lee pitched for Newfoundland and Labrador's Female U-16 team in the 2021 Atlantic Female Under 16 Baseball Championship. During tournament, Lee was named Top Batter and Top Pitcher. Also in 2021, Lee was the only girl on the province's U-17 boys baseball team, where she pitched the team's win in Dartmouth, Nova Scotia.

Lee was named Female Athlete of the Year by Baseball NL in 2021.

Lee was invited and threw the ceremonial first pitch at the Toronto Blue Jays game versus the Cleveland Guardians on August 12, 2022, at the Rogers Centre.

=== Canada Summer Games ===
Selections for Team Newfoundland and Labrador began in 2019. Lee was 13 years old when she attended her first selections camp.

During the 2022 Canada Summer Games, Lee played with Team N.L.. Lee's first pitch was a strike. The ball, taken out of the game, will be on display at the Canadian Baseball Hall of Fame in St. Mary's, Ontario.

=== St. John's Amateur Baseball ===
Lee entered the predominantly male St. John's Amateur Baseball 2023 Intermediate Draft at the age of 17. The draft was held on May 25, 2023. Lee was selected 12th overall by the 2022 Intermediate League Champion Metro Property Management Knights, making her one of the highest drafted female players in the league's history behind Canadian women's national team member Heather Healey.

=== National team ===
In 2021, Lee was among 41 players invited to a women's national team showcase event in Trois Rivières, Quebec.

Lee was added to the Canadian women's national baseball team roster in time for the 2024 Women's Baseball World Cup group stage, played in August 2023. In the finals, Lee earned bronze with the rest of the Canadian team.

Lee will play for Canada in the 2027 Women's Baseball World Cup.

=== Women's Pro Baseball League ===
In the inaugural Women's Pro Baseball League draft, Lee was fourteenth overall by the New York Heights (then named WPBL New York). She made her debut during the league's first game on August 1, 2026.
