= 2027 Women's Baseball World Cup =

Women's baseball world tournament

Tournament details
- Countries: Chinese Taipei; United States
- Cities: Rockford; Tainan
- Venues: 2 (in 2 host cities)
- Dates: 22–26 July 2026 (Group Rockford); 23–27 August 2026 (Group Tainan); 19–25 July 2027 (Finals)
- Teams: 12 (from 4 confederations)

Tournament statistics
- Games played: 30
- Attendance: 18,021 (601 per game)

The 2027 Women's Baseball World Cup will be the 10th edition of the Women's Baseball World Cup, the quadrennial international baseball championship organised under the aegis of World Baseball Softball Confederation for the women's national teams across the world. It will be held in Taiwan and United States from July and August 2026, with the latter hosting the finals on 19 to 25 July 2027. This will be Chinese Taipei and United States' second time hosting. The finals will be in Rockford, Illinois.

For the fourth time, 12 teams took part, following the expansion in 2016. Continental championships acted as qualification. Qualifiers took place between August 2025 and May 2026. The hosts Chinese Taipei and United States automatically qualified, although the former already qualified on merit. Great Britain and Philippines will make their debut.

Japan are the seven-time defending champions, recently beating United States 11–6 at the 2024 final in Thunder Bay.

== Hosts selection ==
- On 10 June 2025, United States was awarded the hosting rights for the group stage and the finals, with the venue being the International Women's Baseball Center in Rockford.
- On 1 April 2026, Chinese Taipei was announced as the second host with the sixth biggest city, Tainan, being the host city at the newly built Asia-Pacific International Baseball Stadiums and Training Centres.
- This will be Chinese Taipei and United States' second time hosting, with Chinese Taipei previously hosting in 2006 and United States in 2018.
- This will be Asia's sixth time organising the event and also the sixth time the Americas has hosted.

== Preparations ==
=== Tickets ===
- On 19 March 2026, the ticket pre-sale started in Rockford.

=== Sponsors ===
==== United States ====
- Bucciferro Family McDonald's (Premier sponsor and the Official US quick service restaurant)
- City of Loves Park (Champion sponsor)
- GoRockford (Presenting sponsor)
- Lino's (In-Kind sponsor)
- Raymond James (Home run sponsor)
- Rockford IceHogs (Home run sponsor)
- The Sports Bra

== Qualification ==
For the fourth time, 12 teams took part, following the expansion in 2016. Continental championships acted as qualification.

| Qualification | Host | Dates | Vacancies | Qualified |
|---|---|---|---|---|
| Host nations | —N/a | Various | 2 | Chinese Taipei; United States |
| 2025 European Championship | (Czech Republic) Hluboká nad Vltavou | 14–17 August 2025 | 1 | Great Britain |
| 2025 Pan American Championship | (Venezuela) La Guaira | 20–26 September 2025 | 3 | Cuba; Mexico; Venezuela |
| 2025 Asia Cup | (China) Hangzhou | 26 October – 2 November 2025 | 3 | Japan; Hong Kong; South Korea |
| Oceanian selection | —N/a | —N/a | 1 | Australia |
| Americas qualification series | (Puerto Rico) Carolina | 29 April – 3 May 2026 | 1 | Canada |
| Wildcard | —N/a | —N/a | 1 | Philippines |
| Total | | | 12 | |

=== Summary of qualified teams ===
| Team | Qualification method | Date of qualification | Appearance(s) | | | | Previous best performance (Note: Bold text indicates they hosted that edition.) | WR (Note: World rankings at the start of the tournament (first group stage).) |
| Team | Qualification method | Date of qualification | Total | First | Last | Streak | Previous best performance | WR |
|---|---|---|---|---|---|---|---|---|
| United States | Host nation | 10 June 2025 | 10th | 2004 | 2024 | 10 | Champions (2004, 2006) | 2 |
| Great Britain | 2025 European Championship | 17 August 2025 | 1st | Debut | | | | 15 |
| Mexico | 2025 Pan American Championship | 25 September 2025 | 2nd | 2024 | | 2 | Fourth place (2024) | 4 |
| Venezuela | 2025 Pan American Championship | 25 September 2025 | 7th | 2010 | 2024 | 7 | Third place (2016) | 5 |
| Cuba | 2025 Pan American Championship | 26 September 2025 | 7th | 2006 | 2024 | 3 | Sixth place (2006, 2010) | 7 |
| Chinese Taipei | 2025 Asia Cup | 28 October 2025 | 10th | 2004 | 2024 | 10 | Runners-up (2006) | 6 |
| Japan | 2025 Asia Cup | 28 October 2025 | 10th | 2004 | 2024 | 10 | Champions (2008, 2010, 2012, 2014, 2016, 2018, 2024) | 1 |
| South Korea | 2025 Asia Cup | 29 October 2025 | 6th | 2008 | 2024 | 3 | Sixth place (2008, 2016) | 12 |
| Hong Kong | 2025 Asia Cup | 30 October 2025 | 8th | 2006 | 2024 | 5 | Seventh place (2006) | 8 |
| Australia | Oceanian selection | – | 10th | 2004 | 2024 | 10 | Runners-up (2010) | 10 |
| Canada | Americas qualification series | 1 May 2025 | 10th | 2004 | 2024 | 10 | Third place (2008) | 3 |
| Philippines | Wildcard | 5 May 2026 | 1st | Debut (Note: Qualified in 2021, but competition was canceled.) | | | | 21 |

== Venues ==
| Group Rockford & Finals | Group Tainan |
| Rockford, United States | Tainan, Taiwan |
|---|---|
| Rivets Stadium | ASPAC Secondary Stadium |
| Capacity: 3,279 | Capacity: 3,000 |
| 2027 Women's Baseball World Cup is located in the United States | 2027 Women's Baseball World Cup is located in Taiwan |

== Groups ==
On 1 April 2026, the groups were announced.

=== Tiebreakers ===
1. Win percentage
2. Head-to-head record
3. Lowest quotient of runs allowed by defensive outs between tied teams
4. Lowest quotient of earned runs allowed by defensive outs between tied teams
5. Highest batting average between tied teams
6. Drawing of lots

=== Group Rockford ===
Group A was contested in Rockford from 22–26 July 2026.

| Pos | Team | Pld | W | L | RF | RA | RD | PCT | GB | Qualification |
|---|---|---|---|---|---|---|---|---|---|---|
| 1 | United States (H) | 5 | 5 | 0 | 102 | 12 | +90 | 1.000 | — | Finals |
| 2 | Australia | 5 | 4 | 1 | 65 | 28 | +37 | .800 | 1 | Finals |
| 3 | Canada | 5 | 3 | 2 | 53 | 30 | +23 | .600 | 2 | Finals |
| 4 | South Korea | 5 | 2 | 3 | 32 | 68 | −36 | .400 | 3 | |
| 5 | Mexico | 5 | 1 | 4 | 32 | 60 | −28 | .200 | 4 | |
| 6 | Hong Kong | 5 | 0 | 5 | 13 | 99 | −86 | .000 | 5 | |

Updated to match(es) played on July 26, 2026. Source: WBSC
(H) Hosts

All times listed are local, CDT.

| Date | Local time | Road team | Score | Home team | Inn. | Venue | Game duration | Attendance | Boxscore |
|---|---|---|---|---|---|---|---|---|---|
| Jul 22, 2026 | 11:00 | Canada | 13–0 | Hong Kong | 5 | Rivets Stadium | 1:56 | 802 | Boxscore |
| Jul 22, 2026 | 15:00 | Australia | 12–2 | Mexico | 8 | Rivets Stadium | 3:13 | 1,153 | Boxscore |
| Jul 22, 2026 | 19:00 | United States | 22–2 | South Korea | 5 | Rivets Stadium | 2:41 | 1,590 | Boxscore |
| Jul 23, 2026 | 11:00 | Australia | 21–0 | Hong Kong | 5 | Rivets Stadium | 2:00 | 353 | Boxscore |
| Jul 23, 2026 | 15:00 | South Korea | 2–15 | Canada | 5 | Rivets Stadium | 2:07 | 450 | Boxscore |
| Jul 23, 2026 | 19:00 | Mexico | 5–24 | United States | 5 | Rivets Stadium | 2:46 | 3,400 | Boxscore |
| Jul 24, 2026 | 11:00 | Hong Kong | 10–16 | South Korea | 7 | Rivets Stadium | | | Boxscore |
| Jul 24, 2026 | 15:00 | Mexico | 2–12 | Canada | 6 | Rivets Stadium | 2:01 | 350 | Boxscore |
| Jul 24, 2026 | 19:00 | Australia | 5–10 | United States | 7 | Rivets Stadium | 2:33 | 2,000 | Boxscore |
| Jul 25, 2026 | 11:00 | Hong Kong | 3–15 | Mexico | 5 | Rivets Stadium | 2:14 | 350 | Boxscore |
| Jul 25, 2026 | 15:00 | South Korea | 3–13 | Australia | 6 | Rivets Stadium | 2:32 | 600 | Boxscore |
| Jul 25, 2026 | 19:00 | United States | 12–0 | Canada | 6 | Rivets Stadium | 2:40 | 2,000 | Boxscore |
| Jul 26, 2026 | 11:00 | South Korea | 9–8 | Mexico | 7 | Rivets Stadium | 3:15 | 500 | Boxscore |
| Jul 26, 2026 | 15:00 | Canada | 13–14 | Australia | 7 | Rivets Stadium | 3:18 | 600 | Boxscore |
| Jul 26, 2026 | 19:00 | Hong Kong | 0–34 | United States | 5 | Rivets Stadium | 2:05 | 1200 | Boxscore |

=== Group Tainan ===
Group B was contested in Tainan from 23–27 August 2026.

| Pos | Team | Pld | W | L | RF | RA | RD | PCT | GB | Qualification |
|---|---|---|---|---|---|---|---|---|---|---|
| 1 | Japan | 5 | 5 | 0 | 54 | 2 | +52 | 1.000 | — | Finals |
| 2 | Venezuela | 5 | 4 | 1 | 26 | 9 | +17 | .800 | 1 | Finals |
| 3 | Chinese Taipei (H) | 5 | 3 | 2 | 35 | 17 | +18 | .600 | 2 | Finals |
| 4 | Philippines | 5 | 2 | 3 | 14 | 23 | −9 | .400 | 3 | |
| 5 | Cuba | 5 | 1 | 4 | 11 | 37 | −26 | .200 | 4 | |
| 6 | Great Britain | 5 | 0 | 5 | 8 | 60 | −52 | .000 | 5 | |

Updated to match(es) played on unknown. Source: WBSC
(H) Hosts

| Date | Local time | Road team | Score | Home team | Inn. | Venue | Game duration | Attendance | Boxscore |
|---|---|---|---|---|---|---|---|---|---|
| Aug 25, 2026 | 19:30 | Great Britain | 2–9 | Venezuela | 5 | ASPAC Secondary Stadium | 2:10 | 532 | Boxscore |
| Aug 25, 2026 | 22:00 | Philippines | 0–3 | Japan | 4 | ASPAC Secondary Stadium | 0:53 | 126 | Boxscore |
| Aug 26, 2026 | 10:00 | Cuba | 2–9 | Chinese Taipei | 5 | ASPAC Secondary Stadium | 1:50 | 200 | Boxscore |
| Aug 26, 2026 | 12:10 | Japan | 23–0 | Great Britain | 4 | ASPAC Secondary Stadium | 2:01 | 100 | Boxscore |
| Aug 26, 2026 | 14:30 | Cuba | 0–6 | Philippines | 5 | ASPAC Secondary Stadium | 1:08 | 106 | Boxscore |
| Aug 26, 2026 | 16:00 | Venezuela | 0–4 | Japan | 5 | ASPAC Secondary Stadium | 1:30 | 75 | Boxscore |
| Aug 26, 2026 | 18:00 | Philippines | 6–2 | Great Britain | 5 | ASPAC Secondary Stadium | 1:41 | 382 | Boxscore |
| Aug 26, 2026 | 20:10 | Chinese Taipei | 1–2 | Venezuela | 5 | ASPAC Secondary Stadium | 1:40 | 135 | Boxscore |
| Aug 27, 2026 | 9:00 | Japan | 13–0 | Cuba | 5 | ASPAC Secondary Stadium | 1:31 | 119 | Boxscore |
| Aug 27, 2026 | 11:00 | Philippines | 2–8 | Chinese Taipei | 5 | ASPAC Secondary Stadium | 1:35 | 55 | Boxscore |
| Aug 27, 2026 | 13:00 | Great Britain | 4–7 | Cuba | 5 | ASPAC Secondary Stadium | 1:44 | 70 | Boxscore |
| Aug 27, 2026 | 15:05 | Venezuela | 10–0 | Philippines | 5 | ASPAC Secondary Stadium | 1:32 | 210 | Boxscore |
| Aug 27, 2026 | 17:00 | Chinese Taipei | 2–11 | Japan | 5 | ASPAC Secondary Stadium | 1:46 | 245 | Boxscore |
| Aug 27, 2026 | 19:05 | Cuba | 2–5 | Venezuela | 5 | ASPAC Secondary Stadium | 1:23 | 143 | Boxscore |
| Aug 27, 2026 | 21:00 | Great Britain | 0–15 | Chinese Taipei | 4 | ASPAC Secondary Stadium | 1:28 | 175 | Boxscore |

== Finals ==
=== Round robin ===
| Pos | Team | Pld | W | L | RF | RA | RD | PCT | GB | Qualification |
|---|---|---|---|---|---|---|---|---|---|---|
| 1 | Australia | 0 | 0 | 0 | 0 | 0 | 0 | — | — | Advance to Final |
| 2 | Canada | 0 | 0 | 0 | 0 | 0 | 0 | — | — | Advance to Final |
| 3 | Japan | 0 | 0 | 0 | 0 | 0 | 0 | — | — | Advance to Third place play-off |
| 4 | Chinese Taipei | 0 | 0 | 0 | 0 | 0 | 0 | — | — | Advance to Third place play-off |
| 5 | United States (H) | 0 | 0 | 0 | 0 | 0 | 0 | — | — | |
| 6 | Venezuela | 0 | 0 | 0 | 0 | 0 | 0 | — | — | |

Updated to match(es) played on unknown. Source: WBSC
(H) Hosts

| Date | Local time | Road team | Score | Home team | Inn. | Venue | Game duration | Attendance | Boxscore |
|---|---|---|---|---|---|---|---|---|---|
| Jul 19, 2027 | | | – | | | Rivets Stadium | | | |
| Jul 19, 2027 | | | – | | | Rivets Stadium | | | |
| Jul 19, 2027 | | | – | | | Rivets Stadium | | | |
| Jul 20, 2027 | | | – | | | Rivets Stadium | | | |
| Jul 20, 2027 | | | – | | | Rivets Stadium | | | |
| Jul 20, 2027 | | | – | | | Rivets Stadium | | | |
| Jul 21, 2027 | | | – | | | Rivets Stadium | | | |
| Jul 21, 2027 | | | – | | | Rivets Stadium | | | |
| Jul 21, 2027 | | | – | | | Rivets Stadium | | | |
| Jul 22, 2027 | | | – | | | Rivets Stadium | | | |
| Jul 22, 2027 | | | – | | | Rivets Stadium | | | |
| Jul 22, 2027 | | | – | | | Rivets Stadium | | | |
| Jul 23, 2027 | | | – | | | Rivets Stadium | | | |
| Jul 23, 2027 | | | – | | | Rivets Stadium | | | |
| Jul 23, 2027 | | | – | | | Rivets Stadium | | | |

=== Third place play-off ===
| Date | Local time | Road team | Score | Home team | Inn. | Venue | Game duration | Attendance | Boxscore |
|---|---|---|---|---|---|---|---|---|---|
| Jul 25, 2027 | | | – | | | Rivets Stadium | | | |

=== Final ===
| Date | Local time | Road team | Score | Home team | Inn. | Venue | Game duration | Attendance | Boxscore |
|---|---|---|---|---|---|---|---|---|---|
| Jul 25, 2027 | | | – | | | Rivets Stadium | | | |
