= 2024 Women's Baseball World Cup Group B =

Group B of the 2024 Women's Baseball World Cup took place from 13 to 18 September 2023 in Miyoshi, Japan. The group consisted of host nation Japan, Chinese Taipei, Venezuela, Cuba, Puerto Rico and France.

== Teams ==
Draw position	Team	Confederation	Method of qualification	Date of qualification	Finals appearance	Last appearance	Previous best performance	WBSC Rankings
B1	Japan	WBSC Asia	Hosts/Asian Cup winners	14 February 2023	9th	2018	Winners (2008, 2010, 2012, 2014, 2016, 2018)	1
B2	Chinese Taipei	WBSC Asia	Asian Cup runners-up	28 May 2023	9th	2018	Runners-up (2018)	2
B3	Venezuela	WBSC Americas	Americas qualifier winners	18 August 2022	6th	2018	Third place (2016)	5
B4	Cuba	WBSC Americas	Americas qualifier fourth place	18 August 2022	6th	2018	Second round (2010)	7
B5	Puerto Rico	WBSC Americas	Asian Cup runners-up	18 August 2022	3rd	2018	Group stage (2010, 2018)	11
B6	France	WBSC Europe	European Championship winners	6 August 2022	1st	—	—	16

== Standings ==
Pos	Team	Pld	W	L	RF	RA	RD	PCT	GB	Qualification
1	Japan (H)	5	5	0	41	7	+34	1.000	—	Advance to finals
2	Chinese Taipei	5	4	1	46	16	+30	.800	1	Advance to finals
3	Venezuela (Note: Venezuela advance to the finals as the second wildcard.)	5	3	2	28	23	+5	.600	2	Advance to finals
4	Puerto Rico	5	2	3	32	22	+10	.400	3	
5	Cuba	5	1	4	19	39	−20	.200	4	
6	France	5	0	5	11	70	−59	.000	5	

Source: WBSC
Rules for classification: 1) Wins/losses; 2) Head to head; 3) Head to head runs against; 4) Runs against; 5) Head to head
(H) Hosts

== Summary ==
All times listed are local, JST (UTC+9).

Date	Local time	Road team	Score	Home team	Inn.	Venue	Game duration	Attendance	Boxscore
13 September 2023	10:30	Cuba	1–9	Chinese Taipei	7	Miyoshi Kinsai Stadium	2:27	100	Boxscore
13 September 2023	14:30	France	1–11	Venezuela	6	Miyoshi Kinsai Stadium	1:45	493	Boxscore
13 September 2023	18:30	Puerto Rico	2–4	Japan	7	Miyoshi Kinsai Stadium	1:49	1,605	Boxscore
14 September 2023	10:30	Chinese Taipei	10–2	Venezuela	7	Miyoshi Kinsai Stadium	2:05	615	Boxscore
14 September 2023	14:30	Cuba	0–11	Puerto Rico	5	Miyoshi Kinsai Stadium	1:46	175	Boxscore
14 September 2023	18:30	Japan	20–1	France	5	Miyoshi Kinsai Stadium	1:44	555	Boxscore
15 September 2023	10:30	Puerto Rico	6–12	Chinese Taipei	7	Miyoshi Kinsai Stadium	2:38	500	Boxscore
15 September 2023	14:30	France	1–11	Cuba	6	Miyoshi Kinsai Stadium	2:08	534	Boxscore
15 September 2023	18:30	Venezuela	4–5	Japan	7	Miyoshi Kinsai Stadium	1:58	705	Boxscore
16 September 2023	10:00	Puerto Rico	13–3	France	7	Miyoshi Kinsai Stadium	2:25	618	Boxscore
16 September 2023	14:00	Chinese Taipei	0–2	Japan	7	Miyoshi Kinsai Stadium	1:52	2409	Boxscore
16 September 2023	18:00	Cuba	7–8	Venezuela	8	Miyoshi Kinsai Stadium	2:44	350	Boxscore
17 September 2023	10:30	France	5–15	Chinese Taipei	6	Miyoshi Kinsai Stadium	2:08	633	Boxscore
17 September 2023	14:30	Venezuela	3–0	Puerto Rico	7	Miyoshi Kinsai Stadium	2:00	984	Boxscore
17 September 2023	18:30	Japan	10–0	Cuba	6	Miyoshi Kinsai Stadium	1:57	2758	Boxscore

== Matches ==
=== Cuba vs Chinese Taipei ===
13 September 2023 10:30 Miyoshi Kinsai Stadium
Team	1	2	3	4	5	6	7	R	H	E
Cuba	1	0	0	0	0	0	0	1	6	2
Chinese Taipei	2	0	1	4	0	2	X	9	9	2

=== France vs Venezuela ===
13 September 2023 14:30 Miyoshi Kinsai Stadium
Team	1	2	3	4	5	6	7	R	H	E
France	1	0	0	0	0	0	-	1	2	1
Venezuela	0	1	3	0	6	1	-	11	10	3

=== Puerto Rico vs Japan ===
13 September 2023 18:30 Miyoshi Kinsai Stadium
Team	1	2	3	4	5	6	7	R	H	E
Puerto Rico	0	0	2	0	0	0	0	2	3	1
Japan	0	0	0	4	0	0	X	4	6	0

=== Chinese Taipei vs Venezuela ===
14 September 2023 10:30 Miyoshi Kinsai Stadium
Team	1	2	3	4	5	6	7	R	H	E
Chinese Taipei	1	0	3	2	0	2	2	10	11	0
Venezuela	1	1	0	0	0	0	0	2	6	1

=== Cuba vs Puerto Rico ===
14 September 2023 14:30 Miyoshi Kinsai Stadium
Team	1	2	3	4	5	6	7	R	H	E
Cuba	0	0	0	0	0	-	-	0	3	1
Puerto Rico	5	0	3	3	X	-	-	11	7	0

=== Japan vs France ===
14 September 2023 18:30 Miyoshi Kinsai Stadium
Team	1	2	3	4	5	6	7	R	H	E
Japan	6	4	3	6	1	-	-	20	15	0
France	0	0	1	0	0	-	-	1	5	2

=== Puerto Rico vs Chinese Taipei ===
15 September 2023 10:30 Miyoshi Kinsai Stadium
Team	1	2	3	4	5	6	7	R	H	E
Puerto Rico	1	3	0	1	1	0	0	6	11	2
Chinese Taipei	6	0	1	3	2	0	X	12	12	0

=== France vs Cuba ===
15 September 2023 14:30 Miyoshi Kinsai Stadium
Team	1	2	3	4	5	6	7	R	H	E
France	0	1	0	0	0	0	-	1	4	4
Cuba	1	2	0	1	2	5	-	11	11	0

=== Venezuela vs Japan ===
15 September 2023 18:30 Miyoshi Kinsai Stadium
Team	1	2	3	4	5	6	7	R	H	E
Venezuela	0	0	4	0	0	0	0	4	4	0
Japan	0	1	1	0	2	0	1	5	11	1

=== Puerto Rico vs France ===
16 September 2023 10:00 Miyoshi Kinsai Stadium
Team	1	2	3	4	5	6	7	R	H	E
Puerto Rico	0	0	3	2	0	1	7	13	18	0
France	0	1	0	1	1	0	0	3	8	1

=== Chinese Taipei vs Japan ===
16 September 2023 14:00 Miyoshi Kinsai Stadium
Team	1	2	3	4	5	6	7	R	H	E
Chinese Taipei	0	0	0	0	0	0	0	0	4	1
Japan	0	0	1	1	0	0	X	2	6	1

=== Cuba vs Venezuela ===
16 September 2023 18:00 Miyoshi Kinsai Stadium
Team	1	2	3	4	5	6	7	8	R	H	E
Cuba	0	0	4	0	0	1	2	0	7	9	0
Venezuela	2	2	1	0	0	2	0	1	8	13	3

=== France vs Chinese Taipei ===
17 September 2023 10:30 Miyoshi Kinsai Stadium
Team	1	2	3	4	5	6	7	R	H	E
France	1	1	3	0	0	0	-	10	11	0
Chinese Taipei	1	0	7	5	0	2	-	0	1	1

=== Venezuela vs Puerto Rico ===
17 September 2023 14:30 Miyoshi Kinsai Stadium
Team	1	2	3	4	5	6	7	R	H	E
Venezuela	1	0	0	0	2	0	0	3	7	0
Puerto Rico	0	0	0	0	0	0	0	0	5	1

=== Japan vs Cuba ===
17 September 2023 18:30 Miyoshi Kinsai Stadium
Team	1	2	3	4	5	6	7	R	H	E
Japan	3	1	4	1	0	1	-	10	11	0
Cuba	0	0	0	0	0	0	-	0	1	1
