= Women's European Baseball Championship =

International women's baseball tournament

- Sport: Baseball
- Founded: 2019
- No. of teams: 4 (2025)
- Continent: Europe
- Most recent champion: Great Britain (1st title)
- Most titles: France (2 titles)
- 2025 Women's European Baseball Championship

The Women's European Baseball Championship is the main championship tournament between national women's baseball teams in Europe, governed by the World Baseball Softball Confederation (WBSC) Europe. Four countries have competed in the first three competitions, with each receiving at least one gold or silver medal.

== History ==
The 2019 Women's European Baseball Championship was held in July and August 2019 in Rouen, France. France, the winner of the championship, qualified for 2020 Women's Baseball World Cup.

The 2022 championship was held on August 3 to 6, 2022. Montpellier, France hosted the second edition, which also served as qualifying event for the next World Cup. Four teams participated with host and defending champion France, the Netherlands, Czech Republic, and Great Britain. France defeated the Czech Republic in the final (13-3) and qualified for the 2024 Baseball World Cup.

The 2025 championship was held in Hluboká nad Vltavou, Czech Republic. Great Britain won their first European championship, defeating the hosting Czech team in the championship.

== Results ==
Ed.	Years	Final hosts	Finalists			Semi-finalists			Teams
Ed.	Years	Final hosts	Champions	Score	Runners-up	3rd place	Score	4th place	Teams
1	2019; Details	(France); Rouen	France	5 – 2	Netherlands	Czech Republic	—		3
2	2022; Details	(France); Montpellier	France	13 – 3 (F/5)	Czech Republic	Netherlands	round-robin	Great Britain	4
3	2025; Details	(Czech Republic); Hluboká nad Vltavou	Great Britain	9 - 7	Czech Republic	France	round-robin	Netherlands	4
4	2027; Details	(Czech Republic); Hluboká nad Vltavou							

== Medal table ==
Rank	Nation	Gold	Silver	Bronze	Total
1	France	2	0	1	3
2	Great Britain	1	0	0	1
3	Czech Republic	0	2	1	3
4	Netherlands	0	1	1	2
Totals (4 entries)		3	3	3	9

== Participating nations ==
Nation	2019	2022	2025	Years
Czech Republic	3rd place, bronze medalist(s)	2nd place, silver medalist(s)	2nd place, silver medalist(s)	3
France	1st place, gold medalist(s)	1st place, gold medalist(s)	3rd place, bronze medalist(s)	3
Great Britain		4	1st place, gold medalist(s)	2
Netherlands	2nd place, silver medalist(s)	3rd place, bronze medalist(s)	4	3
Nations (4)	3	4	4	
