= Valerie Perez (baseball) =

American baseball player and manager (born 1991)

New York Heights – No. 27
- Shortstop
- Born: August 12, 1991 (age 35); Corpus Christi, Texas U.S.
- Bats: Right Throws: Right

WPBL statistics (through September 4, 2026)
- Batting average: .333
- Home runs: 1
- Runs batted in: 9
- Stats at Baseball Reference

Teams
- New York Heights (2026–present)
Medals
Women's baseball
Representing United States
Women's Baseball World Cup
Silver medal – second place	2024 Canada	Team

Valerie Perez is an American professional baseball player and manager. She is the head coach of the Firefighters of the Banana Ball Championship League and plays shortstop for the New York Heights of the Women's Pro Baseball League.

== Early life and education ==
Perez was born in Corpus Christi, Texas to Rene and Maria Perez. She attended Calallan High School, where she competed with the softball, basketball, and cross country teams.

Perez attended Texas A&M University–Corpus Christi, graduating in 2014. While a student, she played shortstop for the Islanders softball team.

After graduating, Perez became a firefighter and paramedic for the Corpus-Christi Fire Department.

== Baseball career ==
Perez was added to the United States women's national baseball team roster in 2023. At the 2024 Women's Baseball World Cup, she won the silver medal with the rest of the national team.

In 2024, Perez became head coach of the Firefighters of the Banana Ball Championship League, making her the first woman to manage a Banana Ball team. When the team expanded the following year, she moved to Savannah to work with the organization full-time.

In December 2025, Perez signed with the New York Heights of the Women's Pro Baseball League.

== Personal life ==
Perez is LGBTQ. She and her wife, Chelsea, have three children.
