= Whiskeyjack (disambiguation) =

Whisky jack is a common name for the Canada jay.

Whiskeyjack, whiskyjack or whisky jack may also refer to:

- Wisakedjak, the trickster god in Anishinaabe mythology
- A bottle jack
- The Thunder Bay Whiskey Jacks, an independent baseball team that played in the Northern League 1993-1998
- Whiskey Jack, a Canadian musical group signed with Boot Records
- Whiskeyjack, a member of the Bridgeburners in the fantasy series Malazan Book of the Fallen
