= Denae Benites =

American baseball player (born 2001)

New York Heights – No. 2
- Catcher
- Born: September 10, 2001 (age 25)
- Bats: Right Throws: Right

WPBL debut
- August 1, 2026, for the New York Heights

WPBL statistics (through September 4, 2026)
- Batting average: .552
- Home runs: 11
- Runs batted in: 38
- Stats at Baseball Reference

Teams
- New York Heights (2026–present)
Medals
Women's baseball
Representing United States
Women's Baseball World Cup
Silver medal – second place	2024 Canada	Team

Denae Michelle Benites (born September 10, 2001) is an American professional baseball catcher. She currently plays for and captains the New York Heights of the Women's Pro Baseball League. She also plays for the United States women's national baseball team and the Loco Beach Coconuts of the Banana Ball Championship League.

== Early life and education ==
Benites attended Centennial High School in Las Vegas, Nevada, where she was the first female student to play on the baseball team. She graduated in 2019.

After graduating high school, Benites became an EMT and volunteer firefighter in Delaware.

== Playing career ==
=== National team ===
Benites joined the US women's national baseball team in 2019. At the 2024 Women's Baseball World Cup, she won the silver medal with the rest of the national team.

In 2025, Benites was one of many international female baseball players featured in the documentary See Her Be Her.

=== Banana Ball ===
In 2026, Benites began playing for the Loco Beach Coconuts of the Banana Ball Championship League.

=== Women's Pro Baseball League ===
In the inaugural Women's Pro Baseball League draft, Benites was selected sixth overall by WPBL New York (later renamed the New York Heights). On July 31, 2026, it was announced that she would serve as the team's captain.

On August 1, 2026, Benites hit the first home run in WPBL history. In the inaugural 2026 season, Benites became the first player to win the batting Triple Crown in WPBL history, leading the league with a .552 batting average, 11 home runs (tied with Kelsie Whitmore), and 38 runs batted in (RBI).

== Personal life ==
Benites is LGBTQ.
