= Netherlands women's national baseball team =

National women's baseball team of the Netherlands

Information
- Country: Netherlands
- Federation: Royal Netherlands Baseball and Softball Federation
- Confederation: WBSC Europe
- Manager: Martin de Koning

WBSC ranking
- Current: 27 ▼3 (31 December 2025)
- Highest: 7 (31 December 2015)

Women's World Cup
- Appearances: 5 (first in 2010)
- Best result: 7th

The Netherlands women's national baseball team is the national women's baseball team of the Netherlands.

The team is controlled by the Women's Baseball Netherlands Foundation, an independent organisation founded by Ivette van Putten and Percy Isenia. The Netherlands debuted in the 2010 Women's Baseball World Cup, managed by Isenia, who had played baseball in two Summer Olympics.

The team has competed five women's world cups, first winning a game in the 2012 World Cup. The team has also competed in all three Women's European Baseball Championships, finishing second in 2019, then third in 2022.

== 2022 roster ==
The following was the squad selected for the 2022 Women's European Baseball Championship.

Netherlands roster – 2022 Women's European Baseball Championship
Official roster		Coaching staff
Pitchers: 5 Anne Bonneveld; 14 Marieke Crama; 18 Magali de Rooy; 35 Kyra Van Genderen; 29 Nikki Groenemans; 21 Zoë Lageweg; 10 Merle Verena Langevoord; 40 Anouk Vergunst; 22 Ciska Antoinette Maria Welboren; 26 Simone Willemse	Catchers: 12 Sascha Egas; 23 Emma Hesp; 24 Vlin Rietema; 44 Nathalie Kimbella Schindeler; Infielders: 18 Magali de Rooy; 12 Sascha Egas; 29 Nikki Groenemans; 21 Zoë Lageweg; 40 Anouk Vergunst; 3 Kika Floor Wessels; Outfielders: 88 Houda Bakkech; 62 Rosemarjin Beerse; 27 Wendy Bladt; 18 Kyra Van Genderen; 13 Esther Mariëlle Maliepaard; 44 Nathalie Kimbella Schindeler; 8 Cherise Stravers	Manager: 41 Martin Roeland de Koning; Coaches: 4 Thijs Bobeldijk (3rd Base Coach); 11 Wybe van Vlokhoven (Pitching Coach); 53 Patrick Schneider (1st Base Coach)

== International competition ==
=== Women's Baseball World Cup ===
Women's Baseball World Cup record
Year	Round	Position	Pld	W	L	RS	RA
(Venezuela) 2010	First Round	10th	4	0	4	8	59
(Canada) 2012	First Round	7th	7	0	7	27	107
(Japan) 2014	First Round	8th	3	0	3	2	32
(South Korea) 2016	First Round	9th	3	1	2	10	21
(United States) 2018	First Round	12th	5	0	5	11	71
(Mexico) 2021	Cancelled due to the COVID-19 pandemic						
(Canada) 2024	Did not qualify						
(United States) (Chinese Taipei) 2027	Did not qualify						
Total	First Round	6/10	22	1	21	-	-

=== Women's European Baseball Championship ===
Women's European Baseball Championship record
Year	Round	Position	W	L	RS	RA
(France) 2019	Finals	2nd	2	3	34	86
(France) 2022	Semifinals	3rd	1	2	41	35
(Czech Republic) 2025		4th	0	3	14	34
Total	Finals	2/2	3	5	75	121

== Shooting incident ==
On August 13, 2010, a Hong Kong player was shot in the leg during a game against the Netherlands at the 2010 Women's Baseball World Cup. The incident occurred in the top of the fourth inning, when the Netherlands were leading with 12–9. The game was being played at the José Antonio Casanova Stadium in Fort Tiuna, a military garrison in Caracas. After the shooting, Hong Kong quit the tournament, and the tournament moved to another city in Venezuela.

== See also ==
- Netherlands men's national baseball team
