= Melissa Mayeux =

French softball and baseball player and softball coach (born 1998)

New York Heights
- Shortstop/Coach
- Born: November 2, 1998 (age 27)
- Bats: Right Throws: Right

Teams
- New York Heights (2026–present)
Medals
Women's baseball
Representing France
European Baseball Championship
Gold medal – first place	2019 Rouen	National team

Mélissa Mayeux (born 2 November 1998) is a French softball and baseball player and coach. She is a coach for the Western Kentucky Hilltoppers and has been drafted into the Women's Pro Baseball League.

== Baseball career ==
Mayeux began playing baseball at the age of four, joining her older brother. As a youth, she played for Montigny Cougars and Barracudas de Montpellier.

Mayeux received international attention in 2015 for being the first female player to be eligible to sign with a Major League Baseball team when she was added to the league's international registration list. She played on France's national under-18 baseball team in 2015 and 2016 and the women's national baseball team in the 2019 European Championship, where she led the tournament with 13 runs scored and, as a pitcher, one save.

In 2025, she was selected by WPBL New York (later renamed the New York Heights) in the 25th round of the inaugural Women's Pro Baseball League draft.

== Softball career ==
Mayeux played college softball for Miami Dade College in 2018 and 2019 before transferring to the Louisiana Ragin’ Cajuns in 2020. In 2022, she was the Sun Belt Conference Player of the Year. That summer, she played for the Smash It Sports Vipers of Women's Professional Fastpitch.

Mayeux played for the French national softball team in European championships in 2015, 2019, 2024, and 2025. In 2025, she played for Comanches de Saint-Raphaël, winning the club European cup. She also played for the team in the French national softball league.

In early 2023, Mayeux became the varsity softball coach of Lafayette Christian Academy. That August, she became an assistant coach for the Northwestern State Lady Demons. In 2025, she was an assistant coach for the Texas–Corpus Christi Islanders. That October, she was named a coach for the Western Kentucky Hilltoppers.
