= 2024 Women's Baseball World Cup Group A =

Group A of the 2024 Women's Baseball World Cup took place from 8 to 13 August 2023 in Thunder Bay, Canada. The group consisted of host nation Canada, United States, Australia, South Korea, Hong Kong and Mexico. United States won the group qualifying for the finals along with hosts Canada. Mexico finished in third and earned a wildcard spot for the finals.

== Teams ==
Draw position	Team	Confederation	Method of qualification	Date of qualification	Finals appearance	Last appearance	Previous best performance	WBSC Rankings
A1	Canada	WBSC Americas	Hosts	20 December 2022	9th	2018	Runners-up (2008, 2016)	3
A2	United States	WBSC Americas	Wildcard	27 March 2023	9th	2018	Winners (2004, 2006)	4
A3	Australia	WBSC Oceania	Top ranked Oceania team	20 December 2022	9th	2018	Third place (2014)	8
A4	South Korea	WBSC Asia	Asian Cup third place	28 May 2023	5th	2018	Second round (2016)	10
A5	Hong Kong	WBSC Asia	Asian Cup fourth place	28 May 2023	6th	2018	Group stage (2006, 2008, 2014, 2016, 2018)	11
A6	Mexico	WBSC Americas	Americas qualifier third place	18 August 2022	1st	—	—	12

== Standings ==
Pos	Team	Pld	W	L	RF	RA	RD	PCT	GB	Qualification
1	United States	5	5	0	71	2	+69	1.000	—	Advance to finals
2	Canada (H)	5	4	1	52	34	+18	.800	1	Advance to finals
3	Mexico (Note: Mexico advance to the finals as the first wildcard.)	5	3	2	43	25	+18	.600	2	Advance to finals
4	Australia	5	2	3	36	35	+1	.400	3	
5	Hong Kong	5	1	4	20	84	−64	.200	4	
6	South Korea	5	0	5	11	53	−42	.000	5	

Source: WBSC
Rules for classification: 1) Wins/losses; 2) Head to head; 3) Head to head runs against; 4) Runs against; 5) Head to head
(H) Hosts

== Summary ==
All times listed are local, EDT (UTC−4).

Date	Local time	Road team	Score	Home team	Inn.	Venue	Game duration	Attendance	Boxscore
8 August 2023	11:30	Hong Kong	9–8	South Korea	7	Baseball Central	3:01	100	Boxscore
8 August 2023	15:30	Australia	2–3	United States	7	Baseball Central	3:10	250	Boxscore
8 August 2023	19:30	Mexico	1–9	Canada	7	Baseball Central	2:00	255	Boxscore
9 August 2023	11:30	United States	14–0	South Korea	5	Baseball Central	1:54	150	Boxscore
9 August 2023	15:30	Mexico	16–8	Australia	8	Baseball Central	2:53	200	Boxscore
9 August 2023	19:30	Canada	22–3	Hong Kong	5	Baseball Central	2:07	410	Boxscore
10 August 2023	11:30	South Korea	3–10	Australia	7	Port Arthur Stadium	2:03	124	Boxscore
10 August 2023	15:30	Hong Kong	6–16	Mexico	5	Port Arthur Stadium	2:07	145	Boxscore
10 August 2023	19:30	United States	23–0	Canada	5	Port Arthur Stadium	1:54	2000	Boxscore
12 August 2023	11:30	Hong Kong	0–29	United States	5	Port Arthur Stadium	2:00	100	Boxscore
12 August 2023	15:30	South Korea	0–10	Mexico	6	Port Arthur Stadium	1:47	135	Boxscore
12 August 2023	19:30	Canada	11–7	Australia	7	Port Arthur Stadium	2:59	458	Boxscore
13 August 2023 (Note: Originally scheduled for 11 August)	11:30	Australia	9–2	Hong Kong	7	Port Arthur Stadium	2:09	116	Boxscore
13 August 2023	15:30	Mexico	0–2	United States	7	Port Arthur Stadium	1:53	98	Boxscore
13 August 2023	19:30	South Korea	0–10	Canada	5	Port Arthur Stadium	1:36	300	Boxscore

== Matches ==
All times listed are local, EDT (UTC-4).

=== Hong Kong vs South Korea ===
8 August 2023 11:30 Baseball Central
Team	1	2	3	4	5	6	7	R	H	E
Hong Kong	2	0	1	2	0	0	4	9	9	1
South Korea	1	3	1	2	0	0	1	8	4	6
WP: Yik Shan Hung (1–0) LP: Ji Sook Lee (0–1); Boxscore

=== Australia vs United States ===
8 August 2023 15:30 Baseball Central
Team	1	2	3	4	5	6	7	R	H	E
Australia	0	0	0	0	0	2	0	2	6	1
United States	0	0	2	0	1	0	X	3	3	3
WP: Elise Berger (1–0) LP: Genevieve Beacom (0–1) Sv: Megan Meidlinger (1); Boxscore

=== Mexico vs Canada ===
8 August 2023 19:30 Baseball Central
Team	1	2	3	4	5	6	7	R	H	E
Mexico	0	0	0	1	0	0	0	1	4	3
Canada	1	0	1	6	0	1	X	9	10	2
WP: Raine Padgham (1–0) LP: Rosa Alarcon (0–1); Boxscore

=== United States vs South Korea ===
9 August 2023 11:30 Baseball Central
Team	1	2	3	4	5	6	7	R	H	E
United States	5	1	1	4	3	X	X	14	13	0
South Korea	0	0	0	0	0	X	X	0	3	2
WP: Jamie Baum (1–0) LP: Sayuri Ono (0–1); Home runs: USA: Ashton Lansdell (1); KOR: None; Boxscore

=== Mexico vs Australia ===
9 August 2023 15:30 Baseball Central
Team	1	2	3	4	5	6	7	8	R	H	E
Mexico	0	0	5	1	2	0	0	8	16	9	2
Australia	2	0	3	0	0	0	3	0	8	8	5
WP: Maricela Reyes (1–0) LP: Morgan Doty (0–1); Home runs: MEX: Diana Muñoz (1); AUS: None; Boxscore

=== Canada vs Hong Kong ===
9 August 2023 19:30 Baseball Central
Team	1	2	3	4	5	6	7	R	H	E
Canada	2	5	3	6	6	X	X	22	16	1
Hong Kong	0	0	3	0	0	X	X	3	2	3
WP: Julia Konigshofer (1–0) LP: Debby Mak (0–1); Boxscore

=== South Korea vs Australia ===
10 August 2023 11:30 Port Arthur Stadium
Team	1	2	3	4	5	6	7	R	H	E
South Korea	0	1	0	0	0	0	2	3	5	6
Australia	2	3	0	1	2	2	X	10	9	2
WP: Claire O'Sullivan (1–0) LP: Songhee Choi (0–1); Home runs: KOR: None; AUS: Ticara Geldenhuis (1); Boxscore

=== Hong Kong vs Mexico ===
10 August 2023 15:30 Port Arthur Stadium
Team	1	2	3	4	5	6	7	R	H	E
Hong Kong	0	6	0	0	0	X	X	6	5	3
Mexico	3	6	0	3	4	X	X	16	9	0
WP: Dafne Limon (1–0) LP: Hei Ting Lau (0–1); Home runs: HKG: None; MEX: Denise Velazquez (1); Boxscore

=== United States vs Canada ===
10 August 2023 19:30 Port Arthur Stadium
Team	1	2	3	4	5	6	7	R	H	E
United States	1	2	0	10	10	X	X	23	15	1
Canada	0	0	0	0	0	X	X	0	3	3
WP: Jillian Albayati (1–0) LP: Marylena Florio (0–1); Home runs: USA: Kelsie Whitmore (1), Olivia Pichardo (1); CAN: None; Boxscore

=== Hong Kong vs United States ===
12 August 2023 11:30 Port Arthur Stadium
Team	1	2	3	4	5	6	7	R	H	E
Hong Kong	0	0	0	0	0	X	X	0	0	6
United States	20	2	0	7	X	X	X	29	15	0
WP: Kelsie Whitmore (1–0) LP: Wai Lam (0–1); Home runs: HKG: None; USA: Alexandra Hugo (1), Jamie Baum (1); Boxscore

=== South Korea vs Mexico ===
12 August 2023 15:30 Port Arthur Stadium
Team	1	2	3	4	5	6	7	R	H	E
South Korea	0	0	0	0	0	0	X	0	3	5
Mexico	3	1	4	0	0	2	X	10	11	2
WP: Rosa Alarcon (1–1) LP: Minsung Park (0–1); Boxscore

=== Canada vs Australia ===
12 August 2023 19:30 Port Arthur Stadium
Team	1	2	3	4	5	6	7	R	H	E
Canada	0	0	4	0	0	3	4	11	10	1
Australia	0	0	2	0	5	0	0	7	9	3
WP: Raine Padgham (2–0) LP: Morgan Doty (0–2); Boxscore

=== Australia vs Hong Kong ===
13 August 2023 11:30 Port Arthur Stadium
Team	1	2	3	4	5	6	7	R	H	E
Australia	0	0	0	0	3	0	6	9	10	3
Hong Kong	0	0	2	0	0	0	0	2	3	6
Boxscore

=== Mexico vs United States ===
13 August 2023 15:30 Port Arthur Stadium
Team	1	2	3	4	5	6	7	R	H	E
Mexico	0	0	0	0	0	0	0	0	1	1
United States	1	0	1	0	0	0	X	2	5	0
Boxscore

=== South Korea vs Canada ===
13 August 2023 19:30 Port Arthur Stadium
Team	1	2	3	4	5	6	7	R	H	E
South Korea	0	0	0	0	0	X	X	0	1	1
Canada	0	2	2	5	1	X	X	10	11	1
Boxscore
