= Brittany Apgar =

American baseball player

Los Angeles Queens – No. 0
- Center Fielder
- Born: August 8, 2003 (age 23); Farmville, North Carolina, U.S.
- Bats: Right Throws: Left

WPBL debut
- Aug 1, 2026, for the Los Angeles Queens
- Stats at Baseball Reference

Teams
- Los Angeles Queens (2026–present)

Career highlights and awards
- WPBL Champion (2026)

Brittany "Britt" Apgar (born August 8, 2003) is an American professional baseball outfielder. She currently plays center field for the Los Angeles Queens of the Women's Pro Baseball League. Apgar was born with hypoplasia, because of which she only has one hand.

== Early life and education ==
Apgar was born in Farmville, North Carolina to Tommie and Tom Apgar, and grew up in Greensboro. She grew up playing baseball. She pitched on a local rec team, and while in middle school, she played for DC Force, an all-girls baseball team.

Apgar attended Southeast Guilford High School. She made the junior varsity baseball team as a freshman, but was later removed from the team due to her gender, after which she played softball.

Apgar attended Greensboro College, where she was an outfielder on the softball team. She transferred to the University of North Carolina at Greensboro during her sophomore year, but later dropped out.

== Professional career ==
In the inaugural Women's Pro Baseball League draft, Apgar was selected 15th in the third round by WPBL Los Angeles (later renamed the Los Angeles Queens). During the 2026 WPBL season, Apgar played 6 regular season games with the Queens, who would go on to win the first WPBL championship title.

== Limb difference ==
Apgar was born with hypoplasia, which prevented her right arm and hand from fully developing. Using bones from her legs and feet, doctors were able to lengthen her right arm and construct a wrist and fingers, which she calls her "nub."

While playing baseball, Apgar bats right handed, with the bat resting on her nub, and throws with her left hand. She used to hit using a prosthesis which was attached to her bat, but she stopped using it after other teams accused it of giving her an unfair advantage.

In 2026, Apgar attended the Boston Red Sox spring training camp with the WPBL, where the impact of her bat with a high-velocity pitch caused the skin of her right hand to split open. This lead her to post a video to Instagram seeking advice about a guard or prosthetic that could protect her nub. She then connected with Chrysta Irolla at the Hospital for Special Surgery, with whom she is working on a new prosthetic.

Apgar has said that her hero is Jim Abbott, a former National Team and Major League Baseball pitcher who was also born without a right hand.

== Personal life ==
Apgar is LGBTQ.

== See also ==
- Pete Gray – American baseball player (1915–2002)
- Chad Bentz – American baseball player (born 1980)
