= Rachelle Henley =

American baseball manager (born 1969)

Rocky Henley

New York Heights – No. 10
- Manager
- Born: Rachelle McCann; January 24, 1969 (age 57); San Francisco, California, U.S.
- Bats: Right Throws: Right

Teams
- New York Heights (2026–present)

Rachelle "Rocky" McCann Henley is an American baseball coach, manager, and former third baseman. She is the manager of the New York Heights of the Women's Pro Baseball League.

== Early life and education ==
Henley was born and raised in San Francisco, where she attended El Camino High School and San Francisco State University.

Henley played softball at both the high school and collegiate level. During the 1989 season, Henley led the Gators softball team in assists, and in 1991 she led in batting average, RBI, and triples. With 44 RBIs, she shares the Gators season record with Daniella Guerrera.

== Baseball career ==
In 1994, Henley played third base for the Colorado Silver Bullets, an all-women barnstorming team. In 1997, she played for the San Jose Spitfires of the short lived Ladies Professional Baseball League. She later played and coached for the San Francisco Fillies of the California Women’s Baseball League.

In 2015, Henley and Alex Oglesby founded the San Francisco Bay Sox, a girls' baseball program operated through the San Francisco Recreation & Parks Department. It is now the largest all-girls baseball program in the United States. Henley and Oglesby later founded Evolution Girls Baseball, a nonprofit organization which promotes girls' baseball internationally. She has coached for organizations including the Bay Sox, Evolution, Baseball For All, and Junior Giants.

In 2025, Henley was inducted into the San Mateo County Historical Association's Peninsula Sports Hall of Fame.

In July 2026, Henley was announced as the first manager of the New York Heights, making her the first female manager in the Women's Pro Baseball League.

== Personal life ==
Henley was married to Robert Henley, who died in 2025. Their son, Jackson Henley, is an assistant coach with the New York Heights.
