= New York Heights =

Women's professional baseball team for New York

Logo
Cap insignia

Information
- League: Women's Pro Baseball League (WPBL)
- Location: New York City
- Ballpark: Robin Roberts Stadium (2026–present)
- Founded: 2025
- Colors: Navy blue Light blue White
- Manager: Rachelle "Rocky" Henley
- Coach: Stephen Larkin; Jackson Henley
- Website: www.womensprobaseballleague.com/teams/new-york

The New York Heights are a professional women's baseball team for New York City that competes in the Women's Pro Baseball League (WPBL). The team is named for civil and women's rights activist Dorothy Height. Its main color is blue, with a color scheme similar to that of the New York Sirens, the New York Liberty, and Gotham FC. Its logo displays a baseball's speed and resembles the New York skyline. The Heights are one of the four inaugural teams of the WPBL, alongside the Boston Hunters, Los Angeles Queens, and San Francisco Firebells.

== History ==
=== Founding ===
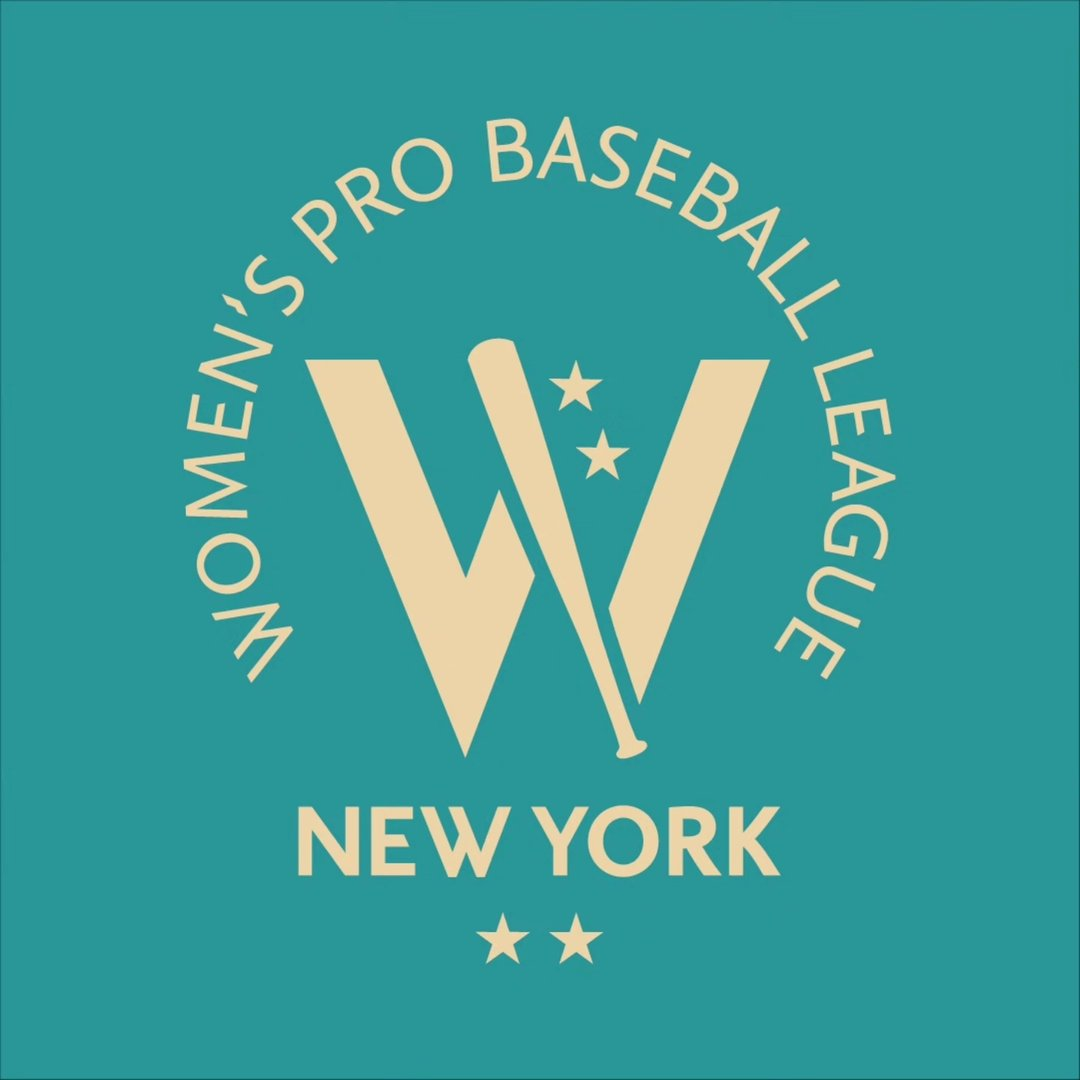
The provisional logo used by the WPBL prior to revealing the team's identity

On October 21, 2025, the WPBL announced that New York would be one of the league's four inaugural teams, alongside Boston, San Francisco, and Los Angeles. New York was chosen because of its big baseball fan base, with two Major League Baseball teams.

In November 2025, the team selected infielder Kylee Lahners with the third overall pick in the league's inaugural draft. The team's first manager is Rachelle "Rocky" Henley, the founder of the San Francisco Bay Sox.

=== 2026 season ===
The Heights are not playing in New York in the 2026 WPBL season. Instead, Robin Roberts Stadium in Springfield, Illinois, serves as a neutral venue for the season. League co-founder Keith Stein has stated that there is a chance of exhibition games being played at the four cities.

Denae Benites was named captain of the New York Heights prior to opening day. In the inaugural game against the Los Angeles Queens, Benites hit the first home run in the league's history.

== Team identity ==
When revealed, the team used the working name WPBL New York. On July 8, 2026, the team received the name "New York Heights" after civil and women's rights activist and long time New York resident Dorothy Height.

The Heights' logo displays a baseball's speed and resembles the New York skyline. The team's main color is blue, with a color scheme similar to that of the New York Sirens, the New York Liberty, and Gotham FC.

== Current roster ==
New York Heights roster
Active roster	Coaching staff
Pitchers: -- (Mexico) Rocio Barajas; -- (Canada) Sarah Beaulieu; -- (Venezuela) Milanyela Cortez; -- (Australia) Maddison Erwin; -- (Canada) Zoe Falardeau; 29 (South Korea) Kim Ra-kyung; 7 (Canada) Jaida Lee; 18 (Australia) Claire O'Sullivan; 31 (United States) Jacqui Reynolds; -- (Puerto Rico) Angelis Rivera; -- (United States) Angela Valenzuela; Catchers: -- (Australia) Chloe Atkinson; 2 (United States) Denae Benites; 19 (Canada) Elodie Ciamarro; -- (United States) Abigail Moore; 13 (United States) Alyssa Zettlemoyer; Infielders: -- (United States) McKenna Huff; 1 (United States) Keira Izumi; 22 (United States) Kylee Lahners; -- (France) Melissa Mayeux; -- (South Korea) Minseo Park; 27 (United States) Valerie Perez; -- (United States) Nicole Rivera-Moats; 23 (Japan) Emi Saiki; 5 (United States) London Studer; 4 (Canada) Madison Willan; Outfielders: 21 (Canada) Claire Eccles; 10 (United States) Katherine Murphy; 8 (Japan) Suzu Narasaki; 15 (Japan) Natsuki Yonetani; -- (Canada) Adelaide Ziebart	Manager: 10 Rachelle "Rocky" Henley; Coaches: -- Stephen Larkin; -- Jackson Henley; Roster updated on August 21, 2026: Disabled list; ‡ Inactive list; § Suspended list
