= Lizzie Murphy =

American baseball player

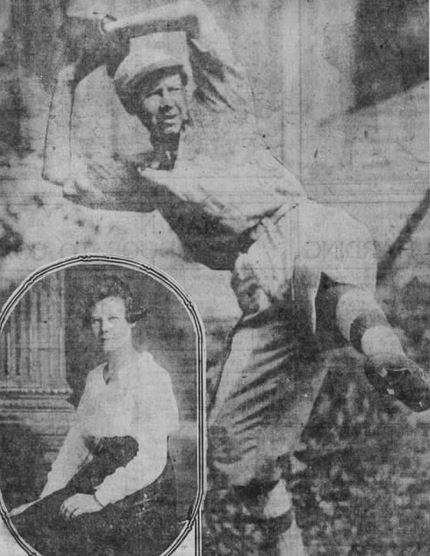
- First base
- Born: April 13, 1894; Warren, Rhode Island, U.S.
- Died: July 27, 1964 (aged 70)

Career highlights and awards
- First woman to play baseball against major league players; first person to play for both baseball's National League and American League All-Star teams

Mary Elizabeth Murphy (April 13, 1894 – July 27, 1964), known as "The Queen of Baseball", was the first woman to play baseball against major league players, in 1922. She played baseball for seventeen years as a first baseman; she also played on several all-star teams and was the first person of either sex to play on both American and National league baseball All-Star teams.

== Early life ==
Murphy was born April 13, 1894, probably in Warren, Rhode Island, though some sources indicate that she was born in Canada. Her parents were Mary (née Garan) and John Murphy; her father was a mill hand and also a semi-pro baseball player. Lizzie was athletic and was a runner, skater, and swimmer, besides playing baseball. By age 12, she had quit school and gone to work at the Parker Woolen Mill as a ring spinner. In her spare time, she played baseball with the Warren Silk Hats and the Warren Baseball Club. By age 15, she was playing on the local men's business amateur league teams, such as the Warren Shoe Company.

== Career ==
By the age of 17, Murphy was playing professionally and demanding to be paid when she played. She first signed with the Providence Independents and then in 1918 she signed with Ed Carr's Traveling All-Stars, a semi-professional team out of Boston. Carr's was a barnstorming team which traveled throughout Canada and New England playing up to 100 games a year. She also played in the women's leagues, playing for the Bloomer Girls for 30 years. When she began her professional career, she was a pitcher, but she was also known as a hitter. Her career average upon retirement was .300.

== Queen of Baseball ==
Murphy was keen on self-promotion, selling photographs of herself between innings. She billed herself as the "Queen of Baseball" but was known as Spike Murphy. Newspapers recognized her skill and rather than bill her as a woman player on the team, she was called by name, as a publicity draw in headlines like, "Lizzie Murphy in Game", "Tyler Will Hurl Against Lizzie Murphys Tomorrow", and "'Spike' Murphy, Woman Baseball Wizard, Learned Game Throwing Stones---'Ty' and 'Babe' Better Beware if "Liz" Breaks Into Game".

Murphy usually played first base and made history in 1922 as the first female player to play against major league players. The game was a charity exhibition pitting all-star players from the New England and American Leagues against the Boston Red Sox. It was organized at Fenway Park to raise money for the family of Tommy McCarthy, who had recently died. McCarthy would later be inducted into the Baseball Hall of Fame. She came into the game in the fourth inning and scored an out at first base from a throw by third baseman Hervey McClellan. Six years later, Murphy played in a National League All-Star game against the Boston Braves and she played in a Negro league game against one of the greatest pitchers in the Negro leagues, Satchel Paige. During the game, Murphy was able to get a base hit and after the game, Satchel was asked if he had pitched more gently because she was a lady. Josh Gibson (the catcher) refuted the claim, stating Paige had treated her the same as any other player. In addition to playing against the Negro league, Murphy played for them. When the Cleveland Giants toured in Rhode Island, she played first base for them.

== Death ==
Murphy retired in 1935, went back home to Warren, and then married Walter Larivee in 1937. When her husband died a few years later, Murphy went back to work in the woolen mills and worked on oyster boats. She died on July 27, 1964.

== Legacy ==
Murphy was inducted into the Rhode Island Heritage Hall of Fame in 1994. Her nickname 'The Queen of Baseball' was used as inspiration for the name of the Women's Pro Baseball League team the Los Angeles Queens.

== See also ==
- Women in baseball
- Women's baseball
