= Los Angeles Queens =

Women's professional baseball team for Los Angeles

Logo
Cap insignia

Information
- League: Women's Pro Baseball League (WPBL)
- Location: Los Angeles, California
- Ballpark: Robin Roberts Stadium (2026–present)
- Founded: 2025
- League championships: 2026
- Colors: Black; Gold; White
- Manager: Eric Young Sr.
- Coach: Emma Charlesworth-Seiler
- Website: www.womensprobaseballleague.com/teams/los-angeles

The Los Angeles Queens are a professional women's baseball team for Los Angeles that competes in the Women's Pro Baseball League (WPBL). The team is named for "The Queen of Baseball" Lizzie Murphy, who was the first woman to play against major league players. Its main colors are black and gold, and its logo is a capital Q topped with four diamonds. The Queens are one of the four inaugural teams of the WPBL, alongside the Boston Hunters, New York Heights, and San Francisco Firebells.

== History ==
=== Founding ===
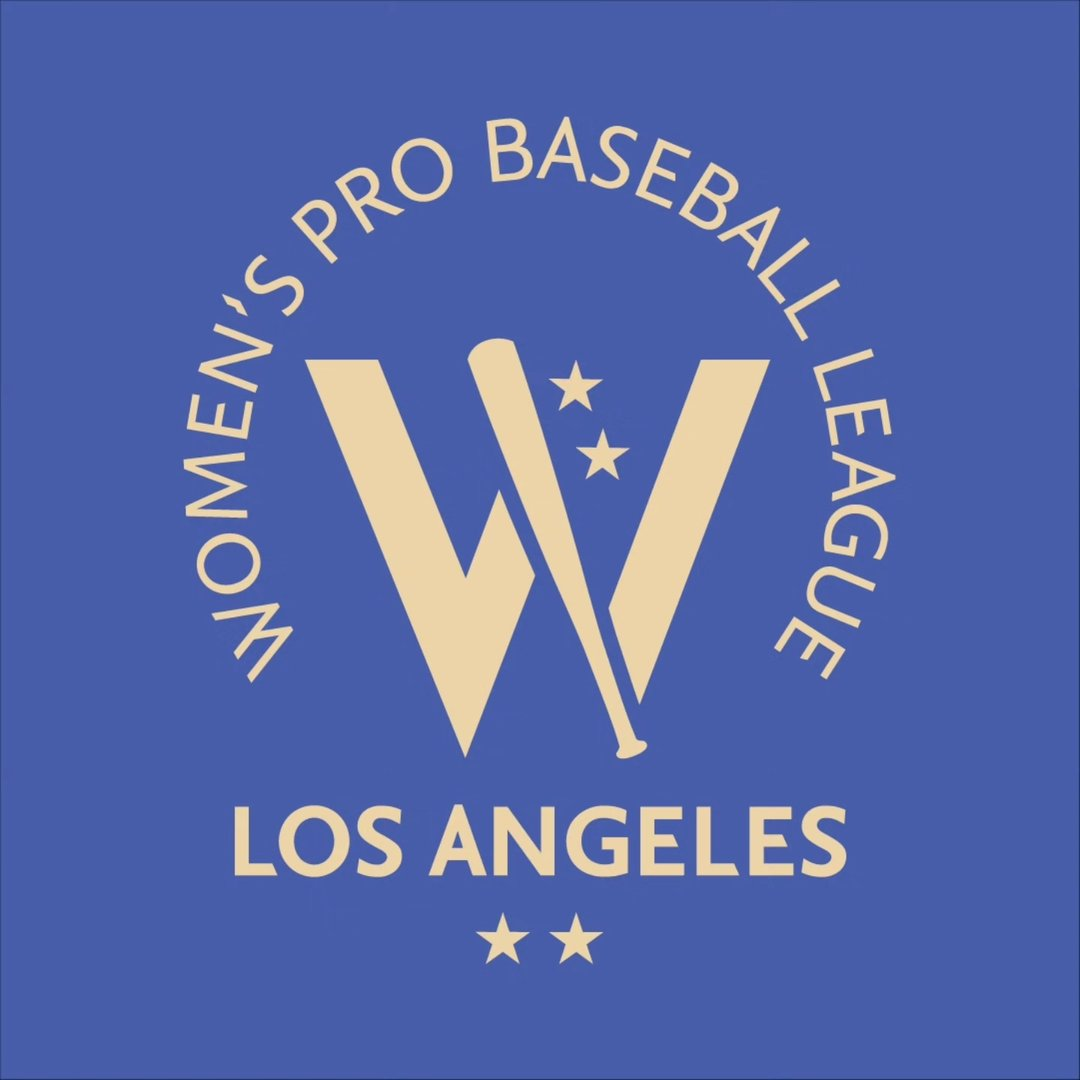
The provisional logo used by the WPBL prior to revealing the team's identity

On October 21, 2025, the WPBL announced that Los Angeles would be one of the league's four inaugural teams, alongside Boston, New York, and San Francisco. Los Angeles was chosen because of its vibrant energy and fan base.

In November 2025, the team selected Ayami Sato with the second overall pick of the inaugural WPBL draft, and Mo'ne Davis with the tenth overall pick. The team's first manager is former second baseman and left fielder Eric Young Sr., who began his career with the Los Angeles Dodgers.

=== 2026 season ===
The Queens are not playing in Los Angeles in the 2026 WPBL season. Instead, Robin Roberts Stadium in Springfield, Illinois, serves as a neutral venue for the season. League co-founder Keith Stein has stated that there is a chance of exhibition games being played at the four cities.

In the first game of the season, the Queens rallied for a come-from-behind victory against the New York Heights, winning 10–8. In their second game, the Queens' Sarah Edwards hit the first recorded grand slam in WPBL history.

On September 22, 2026, the Queens won the inaugural WPBL Championship with a Game 5 2-0 victory over the San Francisco Firebells, winning the series 3-2.

== Team identity ==
When revealed, the team used the working name WPBL Los Angeles. On July 8, 2026, the team received the name "Los Angeles Queens" after Lizzie Murphy, who was nicknamed "The Queen of Baseball" for being the first woman to play against major league players.

The Queens' logo is a capital Q topped with four diamonds. The team's main colors are black and gold.

== Current roster ==
Los Angeles Queens roster
Active roster	Coaching staff
Pitchers: -- (Canada) Sydney Barry; -- (United States) Trinity Curtis; -- (Canada) Juliette Kladko; 13 (United States) Meggie Meidlinger; 27 (Canada) Michelle Roche; 18 (Japan) Ayami Sato; 19 (Japan) Ayuri Shimano; Catchers: -- (Australia) Leah Cornish; 11 (United States) Maggie Foxx; 20 (United States) Jamie Mackay; Infielders: -- (United States) Addisyn Baird; 58 (Mexico) Samaria Benítez; 25 (United States) Sarah Edwards; 29 (Australia) Caitlin Enyon; 17 (United States) Adelaide Frank; -- (United States) Genevieve Hastings; -- (Mexico) Luisa Hernandez; 7 (United States) Amira Hondras; 1 (United States) Ashton Lansdell (Captain); 2 (Curaçao) Tháima Maximiliana; -- (Japan) Rio Obitsu; 10 (United States) Isabella Villarreal; -- (United States) Celicia Wilken; Outfielders: 0 (United States) Brittany Apgar; 3 (United States) Mo'ne Davis; 7 (Mexico) Diana Ibarra; -- (Australia) Elodie O'Sullivan; -- (United States) Brittany Womack	Manager: 60 Eric Young Sr.; Coaches: 22 Emma Charlesworth-Seiler; Roster updated on August 21, 2026: Disabled list; ‡ Inactive list; § Suspended list
