= Alex Hugo =

American baseball and softball player (born 1994)

Personal information
- Full name: Alexandra Renee Hugo
- Born: April 19, 1994 (age 32)

Sport
- Country: United States
- Sport: Softball (2001–2017); Baseball (2018–present)
- Handedness: Right
- College team: Kansas Jayhawks (2012–2013); Georgia Bulldogs (2014–2016)
- Team: Akron Racers (2016–2017)
Medal record
Women's baseball
Representing United States
Women's Baseball World Cup
Silver medal – second place	2024 Canada	Team competition

Alexandra Renee Hugo (born April 19, 1994) is an American softball and baseball player and coach. Hugo has played for the United States women's national baseball team since 2018, and is the only two-time winner of the USA Baseball Sportswoman of the Year award.

== Early life and education ==
Hugo was raised in Olathe, Kansas by Brent and Jaci Hugo. She began playing softball when she was seven years old. She attended Olathe South High School, where she played softball and basketball, graduating in 2012.

== Softball career ==
=== College career ===
Hugo played her freshman season at the University of Kansas, where she played in all 50 games and led the team with 15 home runs.

Hugo transferred to the University of Georgia in 2014. As a second baseman with Georgia Bulldogs softball, she was a two-time NFCA All-American, a three-time All-SEC player, and a finalist for USA Softball National Collegiate Player of the Year. In her sophomore season, Hugo led all collegiate softball players in the nation with 25 home runs. She competed with the Bulldogs at the 2016 Women's College World Series, where they lost in the second round to LSU.

=== Akron Racers ===
In the 2016 National Pro Fastpitch draft, Hugo was selected tenth overall by the Akron Racers. She played with the team through 2017.

== Baseball career ==
=== National team ===
Hugo joined the United States women's national baseball team in 2018, and has been team captain since 2023. Prior to tryouts, she had never played a game of organized baseball. In 2019, the United States won gold at the COPABE Women's Pan-American Championships, with Hugo winning MVP honors and the 2019 USA Baseball Sportswoman of the Year award.

Following the United States' first place win in the 2024 Women's Baseball World Cup group stage, Hugo was again named the USA Baseball Sportswoman of the Year, making her the first athlete to earn the award multiple times. In the 2024 WBWC finals, Hugo earned silver with the rest of the national team. She hit two home runs during the tournament, more than any other player.

=== Coaching ===
In 2023, Hugo became a minor league roving instructor for the Oakland Athletics. In 2025, she was named a special advisor to the newly founded Women's Pro Baseball League, where she works in player recruitment and development.

== Personal life ==
Hugo is married to Taylor Schlopy, her former teammate with the Georgia Bulldogs and the Akron Racers. They have two children.
