= 2022 Women's European Baseball Championship =

Tournament details
- Country: France
- City: Montpellier
- Venue: Greg Hamilton Baseball Park
- Dates: 3 August – 6 August
- Teams: 4
- Defending champions: France

Final positions
- Champions: France (2nd title)
- Runners-up: Czech Republic
- Third place: Netherlands
- Fourth place: Great Britain

Tournament statistics
- Games played: 7
- Best BA: (Netherlands) Anouk Vergunst (.667)
- Most HRs: (Czech Republic) Karolína Blažková (France) Emma Patry (1)
- Most SBs: (Netherlands) Wendy Bladt (5)
- Best ERA: (Netherlands) Ciska Welboren (0.00)

Awards
- MVP: (France) Coralie Guillemin
- All statistics correct as of 28 December 2022.

The 2022 Women's European Baseball Championship was an international women's baseball tournament organized by WBSC Europe. The championship was held in August 2022 in Montpellier, France, as France hosted for the second consecutive tournament. France defended its title from the 2019 tournament. It was Great Britain's first international championship.

== Teams ==
The following four teams qualified for the 2022 championship.

Team	Previous finish
Netherlands	(silver) 2019 Women's European Baseball Championship
Czech Republic	(bronze) 2019 Women's European Baseball Championship
France	(gold) 2019 Women's European Baseball Championship
Great Britain	

== Group stage ==
#	Team	Pld	W	L	RS	RA	AVG	
Q	France (H)	3	2	1	28	28	.666	Qualified for final
Q	Czech Republic	3	2	1	45	40	.666	Qualified for final
E	Netherlands	3	1	2	26	17	.333	Eliminated
E	Great Britain	3	1	2	41	35	.333	Eliminated

August 3, 2022; 11:00	Great Britain	27–10 (5)	Czech Republic	Greg Hamilton Baseball Park; Attendance: 80
August 3, 2022; 11:00		Boxscore		Greg Hamilton Baseball Park; Attendance: 80

August 3, 2022; 16:00	Netherlands	5–6	France	Greg Hamilton Baseball Park; Attendance: 200
August 3, 2022; 16:00		Boxscore		Greg Hamilton Baseball Park; Attendance: 200

August 4, 2022; 10:00	Netherlands	12–2 (5)	Great Britain	Greg Hamilton Baseball Park; Attendance: 0
August 4, 2022; 10:00		Boxscore		Greg Hamilton Baseball Park; Attendance: 0

August 4, 2022; 16:00	France	9–11	Czech Republic	Greg Hamilton Baseball Park; Attendance: 100
August 4, 2022; 16:00		Boxscore		Greg Hamilton Baseball Park; Attendance: 100

August 5, 2022; 10:00	Czech Republic	24–9 (6)	Netherlands	Greg Hamilton Baseball Park; Attendance: 80
August 5, 2022; 10:00		Boxscore		Greg Hamilton Baseball Park; Attendance: 80

August 5, 2022; 16:00	Great Britain	12–13	France	Greg Hamilton Baseball Park; Attendance: 200
August 5, 2022; 16:00		Boxscore		Greg Hamilton Baseball Park; Attendance: 200

== Final ==
August 6, 2022; 12:00	(gold) France	13–3 (5)	Czech Republic (silver)	Greg Hamilton Baseball Park; Attendance: 400
August 6, 2022; 12:00		Boxscore		Greg Hamilton Baseball Park; Attendance: 400

== Final standings ==
#	Team	Record	
1st place, gold medalist(s)	France	3–1	Qualified for 2023 Women's Baseball World Cup
2nd place, silver medalist(s)	Czech Republic	2–2	
3rd place, bronze medalist(s)	Netherlands	1–2	
	Great Britain	1–2	

== Awards and statistical leaders ==
=== Awards ===
- Most valuable player: (France) Coralie Guillemin
- Best hitter: (Netherlands) Anouk Vergunst
- Best pitcher: (France) Cassandra Vigneau

=== Batting ===
- Batting average: (Netherlands) Anouk Vergunst, .667
- Home runs: (Czech Republic) Karolína Blažková and (France) Emma Patry, 1
- Runs batted in: Four tied with 6
- Stolen bases: (Netherlands) Wendy Bladt, 5

=== Pitching ===
- Earned run average: (Netherlands) Ciska Welboren, 0.00
- Innings pitched: (France) Cassandra Vigneau 8 2/3
- Strikeouts: (France) Camille Foucher and (United Kingdom) Claury Rashel Scatliffe: 9
