= Thunder Bay Whiskey Jacks =

Northern League members

- 1993–1998; Thunder Bay, Ontario
Team logo
Cap insignia

Minor league affiliations
- Class: Independent (1993–1998)
- League: Northern League (1993–1998)

Minor league titles
- Division titles: 1998

Team data
- Name: Thunder Bay Whiskey Jacks (1993–1998)
- Colors: Teal, amethyst, white, black, gray, brown
- Ballpark: Port Arthur Stadium (1993–1998)

One of the six founding members of the modern Northern League in 1993, the Thunder Bay Whiskey Jacks were league members from 1993 to 1998. They played their home games at Port Arthur Stadium in Thunder Bay, Ontario. After the 1998 season, they moved to Schaumburg, Illinois and became the Schaumburg Flyers.

== 1993 season ==
The Whiskey Jacks went 36-35 in the first year of the league. Former Chicago Cubs first-round pick Ty Griffin hit .274 and tied for the league lead with 11 home runs. OF Rodney McCray (.242, .341 SLG) led the loop with 35 steals. OF Dennis Hood was eighth in average (.322), but also led the league in strikeouts (75). Yoshi Seo (4-4, 2.37) was third in the league in ERA. The team drew just over 4,000 fans per game, finishing second in league attendance behind St. Paul.

== 1994 season ==
In 1994, Thunder Bay had a 22-18 first half under manager Dan Shwam but fell to 13-27 in the second half. C/3B Pete Kuld (.279, .608 SLG) led the league in home runs (27) and strikeouts (81). Rod Steph (8-1, 2.45) was fourth in ERA and threw the first no-hitter in team history.

== 1995 season ==
New manager Doug Ault's club was last in the first half (14-28) but finished 24-18 in the second half, three games behind the St. Paul Saints. Pat Tilmon (4-4, 3.27) was third in the league in ERA while OF Sean Hearn hit .303, slugged .529, hit 19 home runs and stole 20 bases. Kuld homered 13 times in 164 games before being traded to the Duluth-Superior Dukes - he led the league in homers that year with 24. Two ex-MLB players filled the DH role: Francisco Cabrera (.360, .500 SLG) and Daryl Boston (.280, .391 SLG). After the 1995 season the team was sold by original owner Ricky May to a group led by Bill Terlecky for $340,000.

== 1996 season ==
In 1996, the club finished last in the eastern division in both halves, going a total 33-51 under new manager Jason Felice. The Jacks' attendance of 50,429 was last in the league by over 25,000. Chad Poeck (5-8, 1 Sv, 3.21) was third in ERA, while the club boasted two All-Stars this time, Hearn (.322, .628 SLG, 20 HR) and 2B Casey Waller (.300, .461 SLG). Tilmon had a 5-3 record, 3.05 ERA.

== 1997 season ==
Thunder Bay was 36-48 under Jay Ward in 1997 and attendance picked up but remained last (62,496). DH Danny Lewis (.358, .663 SLG) was second in the league in average and hit 24 homers, while 37-year-old 1B Larry See (.282, .502 SLG) smacked 19 round-trippers. Jim Boynewicz (9-4, 3.83 ERA) was third in innings pitched with 141.

== 1998 season ==
Thunder Bay, managed by Ward again, went 22-21 in the first half of 1998 to take the eastern division over three sub-.500 teams and secure their first playoff berth. The Jacks' fell to 18-24 in the second half. In the playoffs, they lost 3 games to 2 to St. Paul. Attendance continued to trail other teams with 54,566. Boynewicz (7-5, 3.40) was 4th in the league in ERA and Poeck (4-4, 3.47) was fifth. Poeck also threw the second no-hitter in team history. Lewis slipped to .316 with 17 HR and a .563 slugging, while See fell to .235 with 10 HR and a .406 slugging percentage.

== Franchise move ==
A city union strike in Thunder Bay forced the Whiskey Jacks to play the first month of the 1998 season on the road, costing an estimated $200,000 in lost ticket, food, and beverage sales. That, combined with perennially low attendance, caused the franchise to be sold and moved to Schaumburg, Illinois after the season, becoming the Schaumburg Flyers in 1999.
