= 2019 Women's European Baseball Championship =

Tournament details
- Country: France
- City: Rouen
- Venue: Terrain Pierre Rolland
- Dates: 31 July – 3 August
- Teams: 3

Final positions
- Champions: France (1st title)
- Runners-up: Netherlands
- Third place: Czech Republic

Tournament statistics
- Games played: 7
- Best BA: (France) Raina Hunter (.700)
- Most SBs: (Netherlands) Esther Maliepaard (9)
- Best ERA: (France) Camille Foucher (0.00)

Awards
- MVP: (France) Marjorie Brunel

The 2019 Women's European Baseball Championship was an international women's baseball tournament organized by Confederation of European Baseball. It was the first European women's championship and featured three teams. The tournament was held in July and August 2019 at Terrain Pierre-Rolland in Rouen, France. The host team, France, went undefeated and qualified for 2021 Women's Baseball World Cup, though that tournament was canceled.

== Teams ==
Three teams participated for the 2019 championship.

Netherlands	
Czech Republic	
France	Host

== Group stage ==
#	Team	Pld	W	L	RS	RA	AVG	
Q	France (H)	4	4	0	67	32	1.0	Qualified for final
Q	Netherlands	4	2	2	51	34	.500	Qualified for final
E	Czech Republic	4	0	0	34	86	.000	Eliminated

July 31, 2019; 12:00	Netherlands	3–4	France	Terrain Pierre Rolland; Attendance: 220
July 31, 2019; 12:00		Boxscore		Terrain Pierre Rolland; Attendance: 220

July 31, 2019; 17:00	Czech Republic	7–30 (3)	France	Terrain Pierre Rolland; Attendance: 219
July 31, 2019; 17:00		Boxscore		Terrain Pierre Rolland; Attendance: 219

August 1, 2019; 12:00	Netherlands	21–11 (5)	Czech Republic	Terrain Pierre Rolland; Attendance: 85
August 1, 2019; 12:00		Boxscore		Terrain Pierre Rolland; Attendance: 85

August 1, 2019; 17:00	France	15–10	Netherlands	Terrain Pierre Rolland; Attendance: 221
August 1, 2019; 17:00		Boxscore		Terrain Pierre Rolland; Attendance: 221

August 2, 2019; 12:00	Czech Republic	4–17 (5)	Netherlands	Terrain Pierre Rolland; Attendance: 75
August 2, 2019; 12:00		Boxscore		Terrain Pierre Rolland; Attendance: 75

August 2, 2019; 17:00	France	18–12	Czech Republic	Terrain Pierre Rolland; Attendance: 203
August 2, 2019; 17:00		Boxscore		Terrain Pierre Rolland; Attendance: 203

== Final ==
August 3, 2019; 14:00	(gold) France	5–2	Netherlands (silver)	Terrain Pierre Rolland; Attendance: 403
August 3, 2019; 14:00		Boxscore		Terrain Pierre Rolland; Attendance: 403

== Final standings ==
#	Team	Record	
1st place, gold medalist(s)	France	5–0	Qualified for 2020 Women's Baseball World Cup
2nd place, silver medalist(s)	Netherlands	2–3	
3rd place, bronze medalist(s)	Czech Republic	0–4	

== Awards and leaders ==
=== Individual Awards ===
- Most valuable player: (France) Marjorie Brunel
- Best hitter: (France) Raina Hunter
- Best pitcher: (France) Camille Foucher

=== Batting ===
- Batting average: (France) Raina Hunter, .700
- Runs scored: (France) Melissa Mayeux, 13
- Runs batted in: (Netherlands) Anouk Vergunst, 8
- Stolen bases: (Netherlands) Esther Maliepaard, 9
- Home runs: none

=== Pitching ===
- Wins: Six tied with 1
- Strikeouts: Five tied with 5
- Earned run average: (France) Camille Foucher, 0.00 in 5 2/3 innings
- Saves: (France) Melissa Mayeux, 1
