= Mexico women's national baseball team =

National team

Information
- Country: Mexico
- Federation: Mexican Baseball Federation (FEMEBE)
- Confederation: WBSC Americas
- Manager: Ezequiel Buenrostro Avila

WBSC ranking
- Current: 6 ▼2 (9 September 2026)

Women's World Cup
- Appearances: 1 (first in 2024)
- Best result: 4th (in 2024)

The Mexico women's national baseball team (Spanish: Selección Mexicana de Béisbol Femenil) is a national team of Mexico and is controlled by the Mexican Baseball Federation (FEMEBE). It has represented the nation in women's international competition since 2019.

== Roster ==
Roster selected for the 2024 Women's Baseball World Cup finals.

Mexico – 2024 Women's Baseball World Cup roster
Players		Coaches
Pitchers: 44 Maricela Aguillera Reyes; 12 Narda Karla Andrade Alcala; 13 Rosa Maria Del Castillo Alarcon; 4 Marcela Diaz Alfaro; 25 Selene Huerta Valderrama; 19 Marlen Fernanda Lagunes Perez; 11 Daniela Cecilia Leal Aguilar; 1 Dafne Mejia Limon; 54 Veronica Yaneth Romo Lozano; 6 Flor Elena Valerio Montoya	Catchers: 17 Liliana Esthela Segovia Arredondo; Infielders: 9 Rocio Barajas Martinez; 58 Samaria Benitez; 22 Edith De Leija; 13 Rosa Maria Del Castillo Alarcon; 11 Daniela Cecilia Leal Aguilar; 3 Denise Deside Perez Velazquez; 16 Gabriela Sandoval; 17 Liliana Esthela Segovia Arredondo; 30 Maria Jose Valenzuela Gutierrez; 6 Flor Elena Valerio Montoya; Outfielders: 10 Melody Yosarelh Cortes Tapia; 8 Diana Ibarra Muñoz; 19 Marlen Fernanda Lagunes Perez; 32 Valeria Rodriguez Larios; Designated hitters: 9 Rocio Barajas Martinez	Manager: 18 Vicente Gerardo Jimenez Ortiz; Coaches: 51 Agustin De La Caridad Avila Junco; -- Ezequiel Buenrostro Avila; 26 Eliseo Villarreal Felix
Updated: August 5, 2026

== History ==
The Mexico women's national baseball team was formed in 2018, and made its official debut in a game against Nicaragua in 2019.

The team was set to make their Women's Baseball World Cup debut at the 2020 tournament, which they also would have hosted. However, the tournament was postponed, and later cancelled, due to the COVID-19 pandemic. The team instead debuted at the 2024 Women's Baseball World Cup. They went on to finish in 4th place, losing the third place play-off match to Canada.

== Tournament records ==
Women's Baseball World Cup record
Year	Result	Position	Pld	W	L	%	RS	RA
(Mexico) 2021	Cancelled due to the COVID-19 pandemic							
(Canada) (Japan) 2024	Fourth Place	4th	6	2	4	333	17	37
