= Port Arthur Stadium =

Baseball stadium in Thunder Bay, Ontario

- Interactive map of Port Arthur Stadium
- Location: 425 Winnipeg Avenue, Thunder Bay, Ontario
- Coordinates: 48°25′24″N 89°14′23″W
- Owner: City of Thunder Bay Parks Division
- Operator: City of Thunder Bay Parks Division
- Capacity: 3,031
- Surface: Grass
- Field size: Left Field - 320 ft. Center Field - 400 ft. Right Field - 320 ft.
- Public transit: Thunder Bay Transit 15

Construction
- Opened: July 14, 1951

Tenants
- Thunder Bay Whiskey Jacks (NL) (1993–1998); Thunder Bay Border Cats (NWL) (2003–present)

Port Arthur Stadium is a stadium in Thunder Bay, Ontario, Canada. It is exclusively used for baseball and is the home of the Thunder Bay Border Cats of the Northwoods League. The ballpark has a capacity of 3,031 people and seats 2,581, and was opened in 1951.
