= France women's national baseball team =

National baseball team

Information
- Country: France
- Federation: FFBS
- Confederation: WBSC Europe

WBSC ranking
- Current: 14 ▲1 (31 December 2025)
- Highest: 15 (23 July 2025)
- Lowest: 18 (31 December 2019)

Uniforms
Home	Away

Women's World Cup
- Appearances: 1 (first in 2024)
- Best result: 12th

The France women's national baseball team represents the French Federation of Baseball and Softball in international competitions, such as the Women's World Cup and Women's European Baseball Championship. They are currently ranked 14th in the world. The team won the European championship in 2019 and 2022 before finishing third in 2025.

In its first World Cup in 2024, France finished in 12th place, losing all its group stage games in 2023.
