= Czech Republic women's national baseball team =

National baseball team

Information
- Country: Czech Republic
- Confederation: Confederation of European Baseball

WBSC ranking
- Current: 22 ▼4 (9 September 2026)
- Highest: 18 (31 December 2025)
- Lowest: 20 (31 December 2019)

The Czech Republic women's national baseball team is the national baseball team of the Czech Republic. The team competes in the bi-annual Women's European Baseball Championship. In 2022 the team finished runners up in the European Championships, behind France.
