= 2024 Women's Baseball World Cup =

Women's international baseball tournament

Tournament details
- Countries: Canada; Japan
- Venue(s): Port Arthur Stadium and Miyoshi Kinsai Stadium (in Thunder Bay and Miyoshi host cities)
- Dates: 8 – 13 August 2023
- Teams: 12 (from 5 confederations)

Final positions
- Champions: Japan (7th title)
- Runners-up: United States
- Third place: Canada
- Fourth place: Mexico

Tournament statistics
- Best BA: (Japan) Miu Shiraishi
- Most HRs: (United States) Alexandra Hugo (2)
- Most SBs: (Canada) Sena Catterall (6)
- Most Ks (as pitcher): (United States) Olivia Pichardo (8)

Awards
- MVP: (Japan) Miu Shiraishi

The 2024 Women's Baseball World Cup was the ninth Women's Baseball World Cup, an international baseball tournament that was held in Thunder Bay, Canada and Miyoshi, Japan. The group stage took place from 8 to 13 August 2023 as two separate tournaments in two separate locations. The finals took place in Thunder Bay, Canada in 2024. This was the first women's world cup held in two stages. It was the third time Canada has hosted the tournament and the first time more than one nation has hosted the tournament. Defending champions Japan successfully retained their title. The United States defeated Japan in the second round, handing Japan its first loss in the tournament since 2012, but Japan defeated the U.S. in the championship game. Canada, which hosted the finals, finished third.

== Teams ==
Team	World ranking (Note: As of 31 December 2021.)	Method of qualification
Canada	3rd	Hosts
Japan	1st	Hosts & 2023 Women's Baseball Asian Cup winners
France	16th	2022 Women's European Baseball Championship winners
Venezuela	5th	Women's Baseball Americas World Cup Qualifier 2022 winners
Puerto Rico	9th	Women's Baseball Americas World Cup Qualifier 2022 runners-up
Mexico	12th	Women's Baseball Americas World Cup Qualifier 2022 third place
Cuba	7th	Women's Baseball Americas World Cup Qualifier 2022 fourth place
Australia	8th	Top-ranked WBSC Oceania team
United States	4th	Wild card
Chinese Taipei	2nd	2023 Women's Baseball Asian Cup runners-up
South Korea	10th	2023 Women's Baseball Asian Cup third place
Hong Kong	11th	2023 Women's Baseball Asian Cup fourth place

== Venues ==
Group A & Finals		Group B
Thunder Bay, Canada		Miyoshi, Japan
Baseball Central	Port Arthur Stadium	Miyoshi Kinsai Stadium
Capacity: 1,800	Capacity: 3,031	Capacity: 16,000
2024 Women's Baseball World Cup is located in Canada		2024 Women's Baseball World Cup is located in Japan

== Group stage ==
=== Group A ===
Group A was contested in Thunder Bay from 8–13 August 2023.

Pos	Team	Pld	W	L	RF	RA	RD	PCT	GB	Qualification
1	United States	5	5	0	71	2	+69	1.000	—	Advance to finals
2	Canada (H)	5	4	1	52	34	+18	.800	1	Advance to finals
3	Mexico (Note: Mexico advance to the finals as the first wildcard.)	5	3	2	43	25	+18	.600	2	Advance to finals
4	Australia	5	2	3	36	35	+1	.400	3	
5	Hong Kong	5	1	4	20	84	−64	.200	4	
6	South Korea	5	0	5	11	53	−42	.000	5	

Source: WBSC
Rules for classification: 1) Wins/losses; 2) Head to head; 3) Head to head runs against; 4) Runs against; 5) Head to head
(H) Hosts
Notes:

All times listed are local, EDT (UTC−4).

Date	Local time	Road team	Score	Home team	Inn.	Venue	Game duration	Attendance	Boxscore
8 August 2023	11:30	Hong Kong	9–8	South Korea	7	Baseball Central	3:01	100	Boxscore
8 August 2023	15:30	Australia	2–3	United States	7	Baseball Central	3:10	250	Boxscore
8 August 2023	19:30	Mexico	1–9	Canada	7	Baseball Central	2:00	255	Boxscore
9 August 2023	11:30	United States	14–0	South Korea	5	Baseball Central	1:54	150	Boxscore
9 August 2023	15:30	Mexico	16–8	Australia	8	Baseball Central	2:53	200	Boxscore
9 August 2023	19:30	Canada	22–3	Hong Kong	5	Baseball Central	2:07	410	Boxscore
10 August 2023	11:30	South Korea	3–10	Australia	7	Port Arthur Stadium	2:03	124	Boxscore
10 August 2023	15:30	Hong Kong	6–16	Mexico	5	Port Arthur Stadium	2:07	145	Boxscore
10 August 2023	19:30	United States	23–0	Canada	5	Port Arthur Stadium	1:54	2000	Boxscore
12 August 2023	11:30	Hong Kong	0–29	United States	5	Port Arthur Stadium	2:00	100	Boxscore
12 August 2023	15:30	South Korea	0–10	Mexico	6	Port Arthur Stadium	1:47	135	Boxscore
12 August 2023	19:30	Canada	11–7	Australia	7	Port Arthur Stadium	2:59	458	Boxscore
13 August 2023 (Note: Originally scheduled for 11 August)	11:30	Australia	9–2	Hong Kong	7	Port Arthur Stadium	2:09	116	Boxscore
13 August 2023	15:30	Mexico	0–2	United States	7	Port Arthur Stadium	1:53	98	Boxscore
13 August 2023	19:30	South Korea	0–10	Canada	5	Port Arthur Stadium	1:36	300	Boxscore

=== Group B ===
Group B was contested in Miyoshi from 13–18 September 2023.

Pos	Team	Pld	W	L	RF	RA	RD	PCT	GB	Qualification
1	Japan (H)	5	5	0	41	7	+34	1.000	—	Advance to finals
2	Chinese Taipei	5	4	1	46	16	+30	.800	1	Advance to finals
3	Venezuela (Note: Venezuela advance to the finals as the second wildcard.)	5	3	2	28	23	+5	.600	2	Advance to finals
4	Puerto Rico	5	2	3	32	22	+10	.400	3	
5	Cuba	5	1	4	19	39	−20	.200	4	
6	France	5	0	5	11	70	−59	.000	5	

Source: WBSC
Rules for classification: 1) Wins/losses; 2) Head to head; 3) Head to head runs against; 4) Runs against; 5) Head to head
(H) Hosts
Notes:

All times listed are local, JST (UTC+9).

Date	Local time	Road team	Score	Home team	Inn.	Venue	Game duration	Attendance	Boxscore
13 September 2023	10:30	Cuba	1–9	Chinese Taipei	7	Miyoshi Kinsai Stadium	2:27	100	Boxscore
13 September 2023	14:30	France	1–11	Venezuela	6	Miyoshi Kinsai Stadium	1:45	493	Boxscore
13 September 2023	18:30	Puerto Rico	2–4	Japan	7	Miyoshi Kinsai Stadium	1:49	1,605	Boxscore
14 September 2023	10:30	Chinese Taipei	10–2	Venezuela	7	Miyoshi Kinsai Stadium	2:05	615	Boxscore
14 September 2023	14:30	Cuba	0–11	Puerto Rico	5	Miyoshi Kinsai Stadium	1:46	175	Boxscore
14 September 2023	18:30	Japan	20–1	France	5	Miyoshi Kinsai Stadium	1:44	555	Boxscore
15 September 2023	10:30	Puerto Rico	6–12	Chinese Taipei	7	Miyoshi Kinsai Stadium	2:38	500	Boxscore
15 September 2023	14:30	France	1–11	Cuba	6	Miyoshi Kinsai Stadium	2:08	534	Boxscore
15 September 2023	18:30	Venezuela	4–5	Japan	7	Miyoshi Kinsai Stadium	1:58	705	Boxscore
16 September 2023	10:00	Puerto Rico	13–3	France	7	Miyoshi Kinsai Stadium	2:25	618	Boxscore
16 September 2023	14:00	Chinese Taipei	0–2	Japan	7	Miyoshi Kinsai Stadium	1:52	2409	Boxscore
16 September 2023	18:00	Cuba	7–8	Venezuela	8	Miyoshi Kinsai Stadium	2:44	350	Boxscore
17 September 2023	10:30	France	5–15	Chinese Taipei	6	Miyoshi Kinsai Stadium	2:08	633	Boxscore
17 September 2023	14:30	Venezuela	3–0	Puerto Rico	7	Miyoshi Kinsai Stadium	2:00	984	Boxscore
17 September 2023	18:30	Japan	10–0	Cuba	6	Miyoshi Kinsai Stadium	1:57	2758	Boxscore

== Finals ==
Pos	Team	Pld	W	L	RF	RA	RD	PCT	GB	Qualification
1	United States	5	5	0	44	8	+36	1.000	—	Advance to Final
2	Japan	5	4	1	40	14	+26	.800	1	Advance to Final
3	Canada (H)	5	3	2	36	30	+6	.600	2	Advance to third place play-off
4	Mexico	5	2	3	15	33	−18	.400	3	Advance to third place play-off
5	Venezuela	5	1	4	5	31	−26	.200	4	
6	Chinese Taipei	5	0	5	15	39	−24	.000	5	

Source: WBSC
Rules for classification: 1) Wins/losses; 2) Head to head; 3) Head to head runs against; 4) Runs against; 5) Head to head
(H) Hosts

Date	Local time	Road team	Score	Home team	Inn.	Venue	Game duration	Attendance	Boxscore
Jul 28, 2024	10:00	United States	7–0	Venezuela		Port Arthur Stadium			Forfeit
Jul 28, 2024	14:00	Japan	9–4	Chinese Taipei	7	Port Arthur Stadium	2:37	487	Boxscore
Jul 28, 2024	19:30	Canada	7–2	Mexico	7	Port Arthur Stadium	2:18	818	Boxscore
Jul 29, 2024	11:00	Chinese Taipei	0–3	Venezuela	7	Port Arthur Stadium	2:03	71	Boxscore
Jul 29, 2024	15:00	Mexico	1–11	United States	6	Port Arthur Stadium	2:05	121	Boxscore
Jul 29, 2024	19:00	Japan	7–6	Canada	8	Port Arthur Stadium	2:30	1,023	Boxscore
Jul 30, 2024	11:00	Chinese Taipei	3–9	Mexico	7	Port Arthur Stadium	2:09	283	Boxscore
Jul 30, 2024	15:00	Venezuela	0–11	Japan	5	Port Arthur Stadium	2:16	212	Boxscore
Jul 30, 2024	19:00	Canada	4–13	United States	7	Port Arthur Stadium	2:27	1,361	Boxscore
Jul 31, 2024	11:00	Mexico	0–10	Japan	6	Port Arthur Stadium	1:42	111	Boxscore
Jul 31, 2024	15:00	United States	9–0	Chinese Taipei	7	Port Arthur Stadium	2:26	159	Boxscore
Jul 31, 2024	19:00	Venezuela	0–10	Canada	5	Port Arthur Stadium	1:25	732	Boxscore
Aug 1, 2024	11:00	United States	4–3	Japan	8	Port Arthur Stadium	2:19	622	Boxscore
Aug 1, 2024	15:00	Mexico	3–2	Venezuela	8	Port Arthur Stadium	2:28	157	Boxscore
Aug 1, 2024	19:00	Canada	9–8	Chinese Taipei	8	Port Arthur Stadium	2:42	547	Boxscore

=== Third place play-off ===
2024
Team	1	2	3	4	5	6	7	R	H	E
Mexico	0	1	0	0	0	0	1	2	7	1
Canada	0	0	2	0	2	0	X	4	7	2
Boxscore

=== Final ===
2024
Team	1	2	3	4	5	6	7	R	H	E
Japan	0	0	4	3	4	0	0	11	12	1
United States	0	0	1	0	3	2	0	6	9	3
Boxscore

== Awards ==
The following awards and statistics are for the finals and playoff games.

All-World Team
Position	Name	Team
Starting pitcher	Elizabeth Gilder	Canada
Relief pitcher	Miyu Shimizu	Japan
Catcher	Nanako Hanabusa	Japan
First base	Naomi Ryan	United States
Second base	Alexandra Hugo	United States
Third base	Edith de Leija	Mexico
Shortstop	Mia Valcke	Canada
Outfielders	Miu Shiraishi	Japan
Outfielders	Miwa Naraoka	Japan
Outfielders	Sena Catterall	Canada
Designated hitter	Remi Schaber	United States

=== Individual awards and statistical leaders ===
- Most valuable player: (Japan) Miu Shiraishi
- Best defensive player: (Canada) Sena Catterall
- Best batting average: (Japan) Miu Shiraishi and (Chinese Taipei) Yi-hsuan Chiu, .615
- Best pitcher (earned run average): (Japan) Wakana Mori, 1.00 in 7 innings
- Best pitcher (win–loss record): 13 tied with 1–0
- Most home runs: (United States) Alexandra Hugo, 2
- Most runs scored and most stolen bases: (Canada) Sena Catterall, 10 and 6, respectively
- Most runs batted in: (Canada) Andréanne Leblanc, 9
