= Cuba women's national baseball team =

National women's baseball team of Cuba

Information
- Country: Cuba
- Federation: Baseball Federation of Cuba
- Confederation: WBSC Americas
- Manager: Jorge Luis Pimienta Laza

WBSC ranking
- Current: 10 ▼3 (9 September 2026)

Pan American Games
- Appearances: 1 (first in [[Baseball at the 2015 Pan American Games|2015]])
- Best result: 5th (2015)

Women's World Cup
- Appearances: 7 (first in [[2006 Women's Baseball World Cup|2006]])
- Best result: 6th (2006, 2010)

Medal record

Pan American Championship
| Bronze medal – third place | 2009 Venezuela | |
| Bronze medal – third place | 2025 La Guaira | |

The Cuba women's national baseball team (Spanish: Selección femenina de béisbol de Cuba) represents Cuba in international women's baseball competitions. It is controlled by the Baseball Federation of Cuba and is a member of WBSC Americas. The team has participated in every Women's Baseball World Cup since its debut in 2006.

== History ==
Women have played baseball in Cuba since the 1940s. Pioneers such as Mirta Marrero and Luisa Gallego were part of a team called Las Águilas, and a women's baseball governing body was founded in 1947. In the 1960s, Vilma Espín, president of the Federación de Mujeres Cubanas (FMC), helped further develop the sport.

A milestone occurred in 2003 when the Cuban Baseball Federation and the FMC partnered to organize a women's tournament to select the first-ever national team. Cuba made its international debut with friendly games against Canada in 2005, which led to their participation in the 2006 Women's Baseball World Cup in Taipei, where they finished sixth.

Cuba's best international result is a bronze medal at the first Women's Baseball Pan American Championship in 2009 in Venezuela. They repeated this achievement at the 2025 Women's Baseball Pan American Championship in La Guaira, Venezuela, finishing third after defeating Nicaragua 9-8 in the bronze medal game.

At the 2026 Women's Baseball World Cup Group Tainan, a young Cuban team gained valuable experience, earning a 7–4 victory over Great Britain. The team was managed by Jorge Luis Pimienta Laza.

== Rosters ==
=== Current roster ===
Roster for the 2026 Women's Baseball World Cup Group Tainan.

Cuba roster – 2026 Women's Baseball World Cup
| Official roster | | Coaching staff |
| Pitchers: 19 Yanet Carbonell Salinas; 13 Adriana Carrazana Urquiza; 4 Meliza De La Caridad Carro Jimenez; 9 Maiquelis Maricela Chacon Serrano; 22 Aylen Garcia Cordovi; 25 Lorenis Padron Prieto; 24 Erika Gabriela Pelier Turro; 18 Luz Mery Ramos Pérez; 23 Jennys Rodriguez Garcia | Catchers: 15 Yaidelis Olivera Cordova; 14 Leidiana De La Caridad Perez Torres; Infielders: 16 Libia Elvira Duarte Crespo; 20 Marielbys Ferro Varela; 6 Ariansi Fonseca Reyes; 2 Jessica Herrera; 11 Maryolis Osoria Manso; 10 Maikelin Perez Alvarez; Outfielders: 7 Eleyenni Lianet Estupiñan Consuegra; 8 Doris Brianna Fuentes Cruz; 12 Darianna Gonzalez-Longoria Aliaga | Manager: 21 Jorge Luis Pimienta Laza; Coaches: 27 Francisco Ramon Fernandez-Vega Herrero (Pitching Coach); 26 Osvaldo Faustino Torres Licea (3B Coach) |

=== 2015 Pan American Games ===
The Cuba women's national baseball team roster for the 2015 Pan American Games (as of 19 July 2015):

- Leydis Arzuaga (C)
- Yurismary Baez (OF)
- Yulisa Barban (OF)
- Dayanna Batista (IF)
- Vania Cabrera (IF)
- Ana Castellanos (P)
- Yoidania Castro (P)
- Enelsy Cordovi (P)
- Yanet Cruz (P)
- Libia Duarte (IF)
- Jessica Herrera (IF)
- Yadira Lopez (P)
- Dianelis Munoz (OF)
- Odrisleisis Peguero (OF)
- Nilsa Rodriguez (IF)
- Yordanka Rodriguez (C)
- Mayumis Solano (P)
- Mariandy Torres (OF)

Legend: C = Catcher, IF = Infielder, OF = Outfielder, P = Pitcher

== Tournament records ==
=== Women's Baseball World Cup ===
Cuba has participated in seven of the eleven editions of the Women's Baseball World Cup. The team did not enter the inaugural 2004 tournament, was not among the eight invited teams in 2008, and did not participate in 2014. The 2021 tournament was cancelled due to the COVID-19 pandemic; Cuba had qualified via a wild card. Their best results are sixth-place finishes in 2006 and 2010.

Women's Baseball World Cup record
| Year | Result | Position | Pld | W | L | % | RS | RA |
|---|---|---|---|---|---|---|---|---|
| (Canada) 2004 | Did not enter | | | | | | | |
| (Taiwan) 2006 | First round | 6th | 6 | 1 | 5 | .167 | 30 | 56 |
| (Japan) 2008 | Not invited | | | | | | | |
| (Venezuela) 2010 | Second round | 6th | 8 | 2 | 6 | .250 | 49 | 43 |
| (Canada) 2012 | Placement round | 8th | 9 | 1 | 8 | .111 | 42 | 84 |
| (Japan) 2014 | Did not participate | | | | | | | |
| (South Korea) 2016 | Consolation round | 8th | 7 | 4 | 3 | .571 | 42 | 36 |
| (United States) 2018 | Placement round | 8th | 8 | 4 | 4 | .500 | 51 | 44 |
| (Mexico) 2021 | Cancelled due to COVID-19 pandemic (Cuba qualified via wild card) | | | | | | | |
| (Japan) 2024 | Group stage | 9th | 5 | 1 | 4 | .200 | 19 | 39 |
| (Taiwan) 2027 | Group stage | TBD | 5 | 1 | 4 | .200 | 11 | 37 |
| Total | 0 Titles | 7/11 | 48 | 14 | 34 | .292 | 244 | 339 |

Note: The 2027 tournament is ongoing; totals are provisional. The 2021 edition was cancelled, and Cuba did not participate in 2004, 2008, or 2014.

==== 2006 Women's Baseball World Cup ====
Cuba made its debut in the 2006 Women's Baseball World Cup in Taipei, Taiwan. The team finished in sixth place with a 1–5 record, scoring 30 runs and allowing 56. Cuba lost its first five games before closing the tournament with a 14–4 victory over Hong Kong.

Final standings

2006 World Cup – Final standings
| Pos | Team | W | L | RS | RA |
|---|---|---|---|---|---|
| 1 | United States | 5 | 1 | 51 | 23 |
| 2 | Japan | 4 | 2 | 92 | 25 |
| 3 | Canada | 4 | 2 | 36 | 29 |
| 4 | Australia | 4 | 2 | 48 | 28 |
| 5 | Chinese Taipei | 3 | 3 | 37 | 19 |
| 6 | Cuba | 1 | 5 | 30 | 56 |
| 7 | Hong Kong | 0 | 6 | 8 | 122 |

Game log

2006 World Cup – Cuba results
| Date | Opponent | Score | Innings | Result |
|---|---|---|---|---|
| August 1 | Canada | 8–10 | 7 | L |
| August 2 | Japan | 0–15 | 5 | L |
| August 3 | Australia | 4–5 | 7 | L |
| August 4 | United States | 4–14 | 6 | L |
| August 5 | Hong Kong | 14–4 | 7 | W |
| August 6 | Chinese Taipei | 0–8 | 7 | L |

==== 2010 Women's Baseball World Cup ====
Cuba competed in the 2010 Women's Baseball World Cup in Venezuela. The team finished in sixth place with a 2–6 record, scoring 49 runs and allowing 43. Cuba advanced to the second round after finishing third in Pool B with a 2–2 record.

First round – Pool B standings

2010 World Cup – Pool B standings
| Pos | Team | W | L | Pct | RS | RA |
|---|---|---|---|---|---|---|
| 1 | Japan | 4 | 0 | 1.000 | 32 | 2 |
| 2 | United States | 3 | 1 | .750 | 36 | 5 |
| 3 | Cuba | 2 | 2 | .500 | 34 | 18 |
| 4 | Puerto Rico | 1 | 3 | .250 | 11 | 31 |
| 5 | South Korea | 0 | 4 | .000 | 9 | 66 |

First round – Cuba results

2010 World Cup – First round results
| Date | Opponent | Score | Innings | Result |
|---|---|---|---|---|
| August 12 | South Korea | 21–9 | 6 | W |
| August 13 | Japan | 1–3 | 7 | L |
| August 15 | Puerto Rico | 12–1 | 6 | W |
| August 15 | United States | 0–5 | 7 | L |

Second round – Pool C standings

2010 World Cup – Pool C standings
| Pos | Team | W | L | Pct | RS | RA |
|---|---|---|---|---|---|---|
| 1 | Japan | 4 | 1 | .800 | 33 | 14 |
| 2 | Venezuela | 4 | 1 | .800 | 22 | 22 |
| 3 | Australia | 3 | 2 | .600 | 37 | 31 |
| 4 | United States | 2 | 3 | .400 | 28 | 32 |
| 5 | Canada | 2 | 3 | .400 | 21 | 29 |
| 6 | Cuba | 0 | 5 | .000 | 15 | 28 |

Note: The Pool C standings include the results carried over from Pool B against Japan and the United States.

Second round – Cuba results (new games only)

2010 World Cup – Second round results
| Date | Opponent | Score | Result |
|---|---|---|---|
| August 18 | Venezuela | 3–4 | L |
| August 19 | Australia | 2–6 | L |
| August 20 | Canada | 9–10 | L |

Note: The second-round standings also include the first-round results against Japan (1–3) and the United States (0–5), which were carried over.

5th–6th place game

2010 World Cup – 5th place game
| Date | Opponent | Score | Result |
|---|---|---|---|
| August 21 | Canada | 1–5 | L |

==== 2012 Women's Baseball World Cup ====
Cuba competed in the 2012 Women's Baseball World Cup in Edmonton, Canada. The team finished in eighth place with a 1–8 record, scoring 42 runs and allowing 84. Cuba won its final game of the first round against the Netherlands (13–5) before losing both placement-round games.

First round standings

2012 World Cup – First round standings
| Pos | Team | W | L | Pct | RS | RA |
|---|---|---|---|---|---|---|
| 1 | Japan | 6 | 1 | .857 | 66 | 13 |
| 2 | Canada | 6 | 1 | .857 | 84 | 30 |
| 3 | United States | 5 | 2 | .714 | 58 | 34 |
| 4 | Australia | 4 | 3 | .571 | 68 | 42 |
| 5 | Chinese Taipei | 3 | 4 | .429 | 33 | 55 |
| 6 | Venezuela | 3 | 4 | .429 | 35 | 53 |
| 7 | Cuba | 1 | 6 | .143 | 28 | 65 |
| 8 | Netherlands | 0 | 7 | .000 | 27 | 107 |

First round – Cuba results

2012 World Cup – First round results
| Date | Opponent | Score | Innings | Result |
|---|---|---|---|---|
| August 10 | Australia | 4–12 | 7 | L |
| August 11 | Chinese Taipei | 3–6 | 7 | L |
| August 12 | Venezuela | 5–11 | 7 | L |
| August 13 | Japan | 0–10 | 5 | L |
| August 15 | United States | 1–9 | 7 | L |
| August 16 | Canada | 2–12 | 6 | L |
| August 17 | Netherlands | 13–5 | 7 | W |

Placement round – Cuba results

2012 World Cup – Placement round results
| Date | Round | Opponent | Score | Result |
|---|---|---|---|---|
| August 18 | 5th–8th semifinal | Venezuela | 6–9 | L |
| August 19 | 7th place game | Netherlands | 8–10 | L |

==== 2016 Women's Baseball World Cup ====
Cuba competed in the 2016 Women's Baseball World Cup in Gijang, South Korea. The team finished in eighth place with a 4–3 record, scoring 42 runs and allowing 36. Cuba finished third in Group A during the first round and then finished second in the consolation round.

First round – Group A standings

2016 World Cup – Group A standings
| Pos | Team | W | L | Pct | RS | RA |
|---|---|---|---|---|---|---|
| 1 | Venezuela | 3 | 0 | 1.000 | 42 | 2 |
| 2 | South Korea | 2 | 1 | .667 | 15 | 15 |
| 3 | Cuba | 1 | 2 | .333 | 18 | 16 |
| 4 | Pakistan | 0 | 3 | .000 | 1 | 43 |

First round – Cuba results

2016 World Cup – First round results
| Date | Opponent | Score | Innings | Result |
|---|---|---|---|---|
| September 3 | Venezuela | 0–12 | 5 | L |
| September 4 | South Korea | 3–4 | 7 | L |
| September 5 | Pakistan | 15–0 | 5 | W |

Consolation round standings

2016 World Cup – Consolation round standings
| Pos | Team | W | L | Pct | RS | RA |
|---|---|---|---|---|---|---|
| 1 | United States | 5 | 0 | 1.000 | 73 | 2 |
| 2 | Cuba | 4 | 1 | .800 | 39 | 20 |
| 3 | Netherlands | 3 | 2 | .600 | 40 | 29 |
| 4 | Hong Kong | 2 | 3 | .400 | 28 | 21 |
| 5 | India | 1 | 4 | .200 | 22 | 43 |
| 6 | Pakistan | 0 | 5 | .000 | 7 | 94 |

Note: The consolation round standings include the first-round result against Pakistan (15–0), which was carried over.

Consolation round – Cuba results (new games only)

2016 World Cup – Consolation round results
| Date | Opponent | Score | Innings | Result |
|---|---|---|---|---|
| September 7 | Netherlands | 9–8 | 8 | W |
| September 8 | India | 12–1 | 5 | W |
| September 9 | United States | 1–10 | 5 | L |
| September 10 | Hong Kong | 2–1 | 7 | W |

Note: The 15–0 victory over Pakistan from the first round was carried over to the consolation round standings.

==== 2018 Women's Baseball World Cup ====
Cuba competed in the 2018 Women's Baseball World Cup in Viera, Florida, United States. The team finished in eighth place with a 4–4 record, scoring 52 runs and allowing 44. Cuba finished fifth in Group B during the first round and then finished second in the placement round.

First round – Group B standings

2018 World Cup – Group B standings
| Pos | Team | W | L | Pct | RS | RA |
|---|---|---|---|---|---|---|
| 1 | Japan | 5 | 0 | 1.000 | 46 | 3 |
| 2 | Canada | 4 | 1 | .800 | 42 | 16 |
| 3 | Dominican Republic | 2 | 3 | .400 | 29 | 45 |
| 4 | Australia | 2 | 3 | .400 | 49 | 29 |
| 5 | Cuba | 1 | 4 | .200 | 29 | 34 |
| 6 | Hong Kong | 1 | 4 | .200 | 11 | 75 |

First round – Cuba results

2018 World Cup – First round results
| Date | Opponent | Score | Innings | Result |
|---|---|---|---|---|
| August 23 | Australia | 4–12 | 7 | L |
| August 23 | Canada | 7–10 | 5 | L |
| August 24 | Dominican Republic | 12–0 | 5 | W |
| August 25 | Japan | 1–4 | 7 | L |
| August 26 | Hong Kong | 5–8 | 7 | L |

Note: The Australia–Cuba game began on August 22 and was suspended in the fourth inning due to weather; it resumed on August 23 at 09:00 and finished 12–4. The Canada–Cuba game was shortened to five innings due to weather.

Placement round standings

2018 World Cup – Placement round standings
| Pos | Team | W | L | Pct | RS | RA |
|---|---|---|---|---|---|---|
| 1 | Australia | 5 | 0 | 1.000 | – | – |
| 2 | Cuba | 3 | 2 | .600 | – | – |
| 3 | Puerto Rico | 3 | 2 | .600 | – | – |
| 4 | South Korea | 2 | 3 | .400 | – | – |
| 5 | Hong Kong | 2 | 3 | .400 | – | – |
| 6 | Netherlands | 0 | 5 | .000 | – | – |

Note: The placement round standings include the first-round results against Australia (4–12) and Hong Kong (5–8), which were carried over.

Placement round – Cuba results (new games only)

2018 World Cup – Placement round results
| Date | Opponent | Score | Result |
|---|---|---|---|
| August 28 | South Korea | 7–4 | W |
| August 29 | Netherlands | 10–1 | W |
| August 30 | Puerto Rico | 6–5 | W |

Note: The first-round results against Australia (4–12) and Hong Kong (5–8) were carried over to the placement round standings.

==== 2024 Women's Baseball World Cup ====
Cuba competed in Group B of the 2024 Women's Baseball World Cup, contested in Miyoshi, Japan, from September 13 to 18, 2023. The team finished in fifth place with a 1–4 record, scoring 19 runs and allowing 39.

Group B standings

2024 World Cup – Group B standings
| Pos | Team | Pld | W | L | RF | RA | RD | Pct | Qualification |
|---|---|---|---|---|---|---|---|---|---|
| 1 | Japan (H) | 5 | 5 | 0 | 41 | 7 | +34 | 1.000 | Advance to finals |
| 2 | Chinese Taipei | 5 | 4 | 1 | 46 | 16 | +30 | .800 | Advance to finals |
| 3 | Venezuela | 5 | 3 | 2 | 28 | 23 | +5 | .600 | Advance to finals |
| 4 | Puerto Rico | 5 | 2 | 3 | 32 | 22 | +10 | .400 | |
| 5 | Cuba | 5 | 1 | 4 | 19 | 39 | −20 | .200 | |
| 6 | France | 5 | 0 | 5 | 11 | 70 | −59 | .000 | |

Group B – Cuba results

2024 World Cup – Cuba results
| Date | Opponent | Score | Innings | Result |
|---|---|---|---|---|
| September 13 | Chinese Taipei | 1–9 | 7 | L |
| September 14 | Puerto Rico | 0–11 | 5 | L |
| September 15 | France | 11–1 | 6 | W |
| September 16 | Venezuela | 7–8 | 8 | L |
| September 17 | Japan | 0–10 | 6 | L |

Note: Cuba's game against Venezuela went to extra innings and was decided in the eighth. The game against France was shortened to six innings.

==== 2027 Women's Baseball World Cup ====
Cuba competed in Group B of the 2027 Women's Baseball World Cup, contested in Tainan, Taiwan, from August 23 to 27, 2026. The team finished in fifth place with a 1–4 record, scoring 11 runs and allowing 37.

Group B standings

2027 World Cup – Group B standings
| Pos | Team | Pld | W | L | RF | RA | RD | Pct | Qualification |
|---|---|---|---|---|---|---|---|---|---|
| 1 | Japan | 5 | 5 | 0 | 54 | 2 | +52 | 1.000 | Advance to finals |
| 2 | Venezuela | 5 | 4 | 1 | 26 | 9 | +17 | .800 | Advance to finals |
| 3 | Chinese Taipei (H) | 5 | 3 | 2 | 35 | 17 | +18 | .600 | Eliminated |
| 4 | Philippines | 5 | 2 | 3 | 14 | 23 | −9 | .400 | Eliminated |
| 5 | Cuba | 5 | 1 | 4 | 11 | 37 | −26 | .200 | Eliminated |
| 6 | (United Kingdom) Great Britain | 5 | 0 | 5 | 8 | 60 | −52 | .000 | Eliminated |

Group B – Cuba results

2027 World Cup – Cuba results
| Date | Opponent | Score | Innings | Result |
|---|---|---|---|---|
| August 26 | Chinese Taipei | 2–9 | 5 | L |
| August 26 | Philippines | 0–6 | 5 | L |
| August 27 | Japan | 0–13 | 5 | L |
| August 27 | (United Kingdom) Great Britain | 7–4 | 5 | W |
| August 27 | Venezuela | 2–5 | 5 | L |

Note: All five of Cuba's games were completed in five innings due to weather conditions. The 7–4 victory over Great Britain was Cuba's only win of the tournament.

=== Pan American Championship ===
Cuba has participated in all five editions of the Women's Baseball Pan American Championship since its inauguration in 2009. The team has won two bronze medals (2009 and 2025) and finished fourth on two other occasions (2015 and 2022).

Pan American Championship record
| Year | Result | Position | Pld | W | L | RS | RA |
|---|---|---|---|---|---|---|---|
| (Venezuela) 2009 | Third place | 3rd | 6 | 2 | 4 | 41 | 35 |
| (Dominican Republic) 2015 | Fourth place | 4th | 5 | 2 | 3 | 27 | 23 |
| (Mexico) 2019 | Sixth place | 6th | 7 | 3 | 4 | 48 | 78 |
| (Venezuela) 2022 | Fourth place | 4th | 7 | 3 | 4 | 34 | 46 |
| (Venezuela) 2025 | Third place | 3rd | 6 | 4 | 2 | 27 | 30 |
| Total | 0 Titles | 5/5 | 31 | 14 | 17 | 177 | 212 |

==== 2009 Pan American Championship ====
The 2009 tournament, officially the I Campeonato Panamericano de Béisbol Femenino, was the inaugural edition of the Women's Baseball Pan American Championship. It was held in Valencia, Venezuela, from November 15 to 20, 2009, with four participating teams: Puerto Rico, Venezuela, Cuba, and the Dominican Republic. The tournament served as a qualifier for the 2010 Women's Baseball World Cup.

The format was a single round-robin followed by a semifinal between the second- and third-placed teams, with the winner advancing to the final against the first-placed team. Cuba finished the group stage in third place with a 2–3 record (28 runs scored, 21 allowed). In the semifinal, Cuba lost to Venezuela 13–14. As the semifinal loser, Cuba took the bronze medal, while the Dominican Republic finished fourth after the group stage.

Group stage

2009 Pan American Championship – Group stage
| Date | Team 1 | Score | Team 2 |
|---|---|---|---|
| November 15 | Cuba | 9–0 | Dominican Republic |
| November 16 | Puerto Rico | 7–5 | Cuba |
| November 17 | Puerto Rico | 3–1 | Cuba |
| November 18 | Cuba | 11–5 | Dominican Republic |
| November 19 | Venezuela | 6–2 | Cuba |

Note: The Venezuela–Cuba game scheduled for November 17 was rained out and rescheduled for November 19.

Group stage standings

2009 Pan American Championship – Final standings
| Pos | Team | Pld | W | L | RS | RA |
|---|---|---|---|---|---|---|
| 1 | Puerto Rico | 5 | 5 | 0 | 46 | 9 |
| 2 | Venezuela | 4 | 3 | 1 | 33 | 14 |
| 3 | Cuba | 5 | 2 | 3 | 28 | 21 |
| 4 | Dominican Republic | 6 | 0 | 6 | 11 | 74 |

Semifinal

| November 20, 2009 Pan American Championship; Semifinal | Venezuela | 14–13 | Cuba | Valencia, Venezuela |
| | | | | Stadium: Estadio Alejandro Sevilla; Attendance: 400 |

Summary

2009 Pan American Championship record
| Pld | W | L | RS | RA |
|---|---|---|---|---|
| 6 | 2 | 4 | 41 | 35 |

==== 2015 Pan American Championship ====
The 2015 tournament, officially the II Campeonato Panamericano de Béisbol Femenino, was held in Santiago and La Vega, Dominican Republic, from March 8 to 12, 2015. It served as a qualifier for the 2015 Pan American Games women's baseball tournament, with the top four teams earning berths.

Cuba finished the round-robin with a 2–2 record, which was enough to secure one of the four qualifying spots for the Pan American Games. They lost to Puerto Rico in the bronze medal game, finishing in fourth place.

Opening round

2015 Pan American Championship – Opening round
| Date | Team 1 | Score | Team 2 |
|---|---|---|---|
| March 8 | Cuba | 14–4 | Dominican Republic |
| March 9 | Cuba | 5–3 | Puerto Rico |
| March 10 | United States | 1–0 | Cuba |
| March 11 | Venezuela | 9–4 | Cuba |

Bronze medal game

| March 12, 2015 Pan American Championship; Bronze medal game | Cuba | 4–6 | Puerto Rico | La Vega, Dominican Republic |
| | | | | Stadium: Estadio de La Vega |

Summary

2015 Pan American Championship record
| Pld | W | L | RS | RA |
|---|---|---|---|---|
| 5 | 2 | 3 | 27 | 23 |

==== 2019 Pan American Championship ====
The 2019 tournament, officially the I Campeonato Panamericano Femenino de Béisbol, was held in Aguascalientes, Mexico, from August 18 to 25, 2019. The tournament served as a qualifier for the 2020 Women's Baseball World Cup, with the top four teams earning berths.

Cuba finished the tournament in sixth place with a record of 3 wins and 4 losses. The team was in contention for a World Cup berth until the final day, when a 8–7 victory over the Dominican Republic left Cuba, Mexico, and the Dominican Republic tied at 3–4. The tiebreaker for the final berth favored Mexico on run differential.

Opening round

2019 Pan American Championship – Opening round
| Date | Team 1 | Score | Team 2 |
|---|---|---|---|
| August 18 | Cuba | 11–9 | Puerto Rico |
| August 19 | Mexico | 7–6 | Cuba |
| August 21 | Canada | 7–5 | Cuba |
| August 21 | Cuba | 15–14 | Nicaragua |
| August 22 | United States | 23–1 | Cuba |
| August 23 | Venezuela | 13–2 | Cuba |
| August 25 | Cuba | 8–7 | Dominican Republic |

Summary

2019 Pan American Championship record
| Pld | W | L | RS | RA |
|---|---|---|---|---|
| 7 | 3 | 4 | 48 | 78 |

==== 2022 Pan American Championship ====
Cuba competed in the 2022 Women's Baseball Pan American Championship in La Guaira, Venezuela, which also served as a qualifier for the 2024 Women's Baseball World Cup. The team finished in fourth place after losing to Venezuela in the semifinals and to Mexico in the bronze medal game. Despite the fourth-place finish, Cuba qualified for the World Cup as one of the top four teams in the tournament.

Opening round

2022 Pan American Championship – Opening round
| Date | Team 1 | Score | Team 2 |
|---|---|---|---|
| August 12 | Cuba | 1–11 | Puerto Rico |
| August 13 | Cuba | 6–4 | Dominican Republic |
| August 14 | Venezuela | 8–3 | Cuba |
| August 16 | Nicaragua | 2–12 | Cuba |
| August 17 | Cuba | 7–2 | Mexico |

Knockout stage

| August 19, 2022 Pan American Championship; Semifinal | Cuba | 0–10 | Venezuela | Macuto, Venezuela |
| 18:00 | | | | Stadium: Estadio Jorge Luis García Carneiro |

| August 20, 2022 Pan American Championship; Bronze medal game | Cuba | 5–9 | Mexico | Macuto, Venezuela |
| | | | | Stadium: Estadio Jorge Luis García Carneiro |

Summary

2022 Pan American Championship record
| Pld | W | L | RS | RA |
|---|---|---|---|---|
| 7 | 3 | 4 | 34 | 46 |

==== 2025 Pan American Championship ====
Cuba competed in the 2025 Women's Baseball Pan American Championship in La Guaira, Venezuela. The team finished the opening round with a 3–1 record, scoring 16 runs and allowing 16, to advance to the semifinals. They lost 2–6 to Mexico in the semifinals but rebounded to defeat Nicaragua 9–8 in eight innings in the bronze medal game, securing third place and a berth in the 2027 Women's Baseball World Cup.

Opening round

2025 Pan American Championship – Opening round
| Date | Team 1 | Score | Team 2 |
|---|---|---|---|
| September 20 | Venezuela | 11–0 (F/5) | Cuba |
| September 22 | Argentina | 2–7 | Cuba |
| September 23 | Cuba | 3–1 | Nicaragua |
| September 24 | Cuba | 6–2 | Mexico |

Knockout stage

| September 25, 2025 Pan American Championship; Semifinal | Mexico | 6–2 | Cuba | La Guaira, Venezuela |
| 14:30 | | | | Stadium: Estadio Fórum La Guaira; Attendance: 100 |

| September 26, 2025 Pan American Championship; Bronze medal game | Nicaragua | 8–9 | Cuba | La Guaira, Venezuela |
| 13:00 | | | | Stadium: Estadio Fórum La Guaira; Attendance: 100 |

Summary

2025 Pan American Championship record
| Pld | W | L | RS | RA |
|---|---|---|---|---|
| 6 | 4 | 2 | 27 | 30 |

=== Pan American Games ===
Cuba competed in the first and, to date, only women's baseball tournament held at the Pan American Games, which took place in Toronto, Canada, in July 2015. The team finished in fifth place after losing all four of its preliminary round games. The team scored 8 runs and allowed 43.

Pan American Games record
| Year | Result | Position | Pld | W | L | RS | RA |
|---|---|---|---|---|---|---|---|
| (Canada) 2015 | Preliminary round | 5th | 4 | 0 | 4 | 8 | 43 |
| Total | 0 Titles | 1/1 | 4 | 0 | 4 | 8 | 43 |

2015 Pan American Games game log

| July 20, 2015 Pan American Games; Preliminary round | Cuba | 1–13 | Canada | Ajax, Canada |
| 19:00 | | | | Stadium: President's Choice Ajax Pan Am Ballpark |

| July 21, 2015 Pan American Games; Preliminary round | Cuba | 5–6 | Puerto Rico | Ajax, Canada |
| 15:00 | | | | Stadium: President's Choice Ajax Pan Am Ballpark |

| July 22, 2015 Pan American Games; Preliminary round | Cuba | 0–11 | United States | Ajax, Canada |
| | | | | Stadium: President's Choice Ajax Pan Am Ballpark |

| July 23, 2015 Pan American Games; Preliminary round | Cuba | 2–13 | Venezuela | Ajax, Canada |
| 15:00 | | | | Stadium: President's Choice Ajax Pan Am Ballpark |

== Head-to-head record ==
The following table summarizes Cuba's results against every opponent it has faced in official competition (Women's Baseball World Cup, Women's Baseball Pan American Championship and Pan American Games). It is sorted by number of meetings, then by wins, then by runs scored. All games are decided; there are no draws in baseball.

Cuba women's national baseball team – head-to-head record
| Opponent | Years | Comps | Pld | W | L | RF | RA | RD | Pct |
|---|---|---|---|---|---|---|---|---|---|
| Venezuela | 2009–2027 | WC, PAC, PAG | 14 | 0 | 14 | 49 | 133 | −84 | .000 |
| Puerto Rico | 2009–2024 | WC, PAC, PAG | 10 | 4 | 6 | 50 | 62 | −12 | .400 |
| Canada | 2006–2019 | WC, PAC, PAG | 7 | 0 | 7 | 32 | 67 | −35 | .000 |
| United States | 2006–2019 | WC, PAC, PAG | 7 | 0 | 7 | 7 | 73 | −66 | .000 |
| Dominican Republic | 2009–2022 | WC, PAC | 6 | 6 | 0 | 60 | 20 | +40 | 1.000 |
| Japan | 2006–2027 | WC | 6 | 0 | 6 | 2 | 55 | −53 | .000 |
| Mexico | 2019–2025 | PAC | 5 | 2 | 3 | 26 | 26 | 0 | .400 |
| Nicaragua | 2019–2025 | PAC | 4 | 4 | 0 | 39 | 25 | +14 | 1.000 |
| Netherlands | 2012–2018 | WC | 4 | 3 | 1 | 40 | 24 | +16 | .750 |
| Australia | 2006–2018 | WC | 4 | 0 | 4 | 14 | 35 | −21 | .000 |
| Chinese Taipei | 2006–2027 | WC | 4 | 0 | 4 | 6 | 32 | −26 | .000 |
| South Korea | 2010–2018 | WC | 3 | 2 | 1 | 31 | 17 | +14 | .667 |
| Hong Kong | 2006–2018 | WC | 3 | 2 | 1 | 21 | 13 | +8 | .667 |
| Pakistan | 2016 | WC | 1 | 1 | 0 | 15 | 0 | +15 | 1.000 |
| India | 2016 | WC | 1 | 1 | 0 | 12 | 1 | +11 | 1.000 |
| France | 2024 | WC | 1 | 1 | 0 | 11 | 1 | +10 | 1.000 |
| Argentina | 2025 | PAC | 1 | 1 | 0 | 7 | 2 | +5 | 1.000 |
| (United Kingdom) Great Britain | 2027 | WC | 1 | 1 | 0 | 7 | 4 | +3 | 1.000 |
| Philippines | 2027 | WC | 1 | 0 | 1 | 0 | 6 | −6 | .000 |
| Total | | | 83 | 28 | 55 | 429 | 596 | −167 | .337 |

Legend: WC = Women's Baseball World Cup; PAC = Women's Baseball Pan American Championship; PAG = Pan American Games.

=== Record by confederation ===
Cuba's record by WBSC confederation
| Confederation | Opponents | Pld | W | L | RF | RA | RD | Pct |
|---|---|---|---|---|---|---|---|---|
| WBSC Americas | 8 | 54 | 17 | 37 | 270 | 408 | −138 | .315 |
| WBSC Asia | 7 | 19 | 6 | 13 | 87 | 124 | −37 | .316 |
| WBSC Europe | 3 | 6 | 5 | 1 | 58 | 29 | +29 | .833 |
| WBSC Oceania | 1 | 4 | 0 | 4 | 14 | 35 | −21 | .000 |
| Total | | 83 | 28 | 55 | 429 | 596 | −167 | .337 |

=== Notable results ===
- Biggest win: 15–0 vs Pakistan (2016 Women's Baseball World Cup, September 5, 2016).
- Highest-scoring game: 21–9 vs South Korea (2010 Women's Baseball World Cup, August 13, 2010) — 30 combined runs.
- Biggest loss: 1–23 vs the United States (2019 Women's Baseball Pan American Championship, August 22, 2019).
- Most frequent opponent: Venezuela (14 meetings, 0 wins).
- Best record against a single opponent: Dominican Republic (6–0).
- Cuba is unbeaten against the Dominican Republic (6–0) and Nicaragua (4–0).
- Cuba has never beaten Venezuela (0–14), Canada (0–7), the United States (0–7), Japan (0–6), Australia (0–4), Chinese Taipei (0–4), or the Philippines (0–1).

== See also ==
- Cuba national baseball team – men's national baseball team
- Cuba women's national softball team
- Cuba men's national softball team
- Cuba national baseball5 team
