= Tara Harbert =

American baseball player

Medal record

Women's baseball

Representing United States

Women's Baseball World Cup
Bronze medal – third place	2008 Japan	Team competition
Bronze medal – third place	2010 Venezuela	Team competition
Silver medal – second place	2012 Canada	Team competition
Silver medal – second place	2014 Japan	Team competition

Tara Harbert (born October 18, 1983) is a member of the United States women's national baseball team. Her father, Roger Harbert played professional baseball in Australia during the 1960s.

== Playing career ==
=== Baseball ===
In preparation for the Team USA tryouts in 2008, she was coached by former Major Leaguer and Colorado Rockies coach Walt Weiss. She would serve as the leadoff hitter for Team USA at the 2008 and 2010 Women's Baseball World Cup.

With the New England Women's Red Sox, she was part of the team that captured the 2012 Roy Hobbes Cup.

She was announced as part of the roster for the Baseball at the 2015 Pan American Games, but was not in the final roster.

=== Softball ===
As a teenager, she played for the Colorado Stars, who were part of the American Softball Association Gold League. Harbert earned a scholarship to the University of Hawaii. In her junior season, she hit .423, and .486 in conference play, earning All-Conference and All-America honors.

Harbert transferred to Colorado State as a senior. She would steal 28 bases and earn All-Conference Team honors. In the summer of 2006, she was recruited to play softball in Europe by a team in Parma, Italy.

== Awards and honors ==
- 2010 Women's Baseball World Cup, Best Defensive Player

== Personal ==
Her sister, Tanya, earned a gymnastics scholarship to Denver University.
