= Jacinda Barclay =

Australian sportswoman (1991–2020)

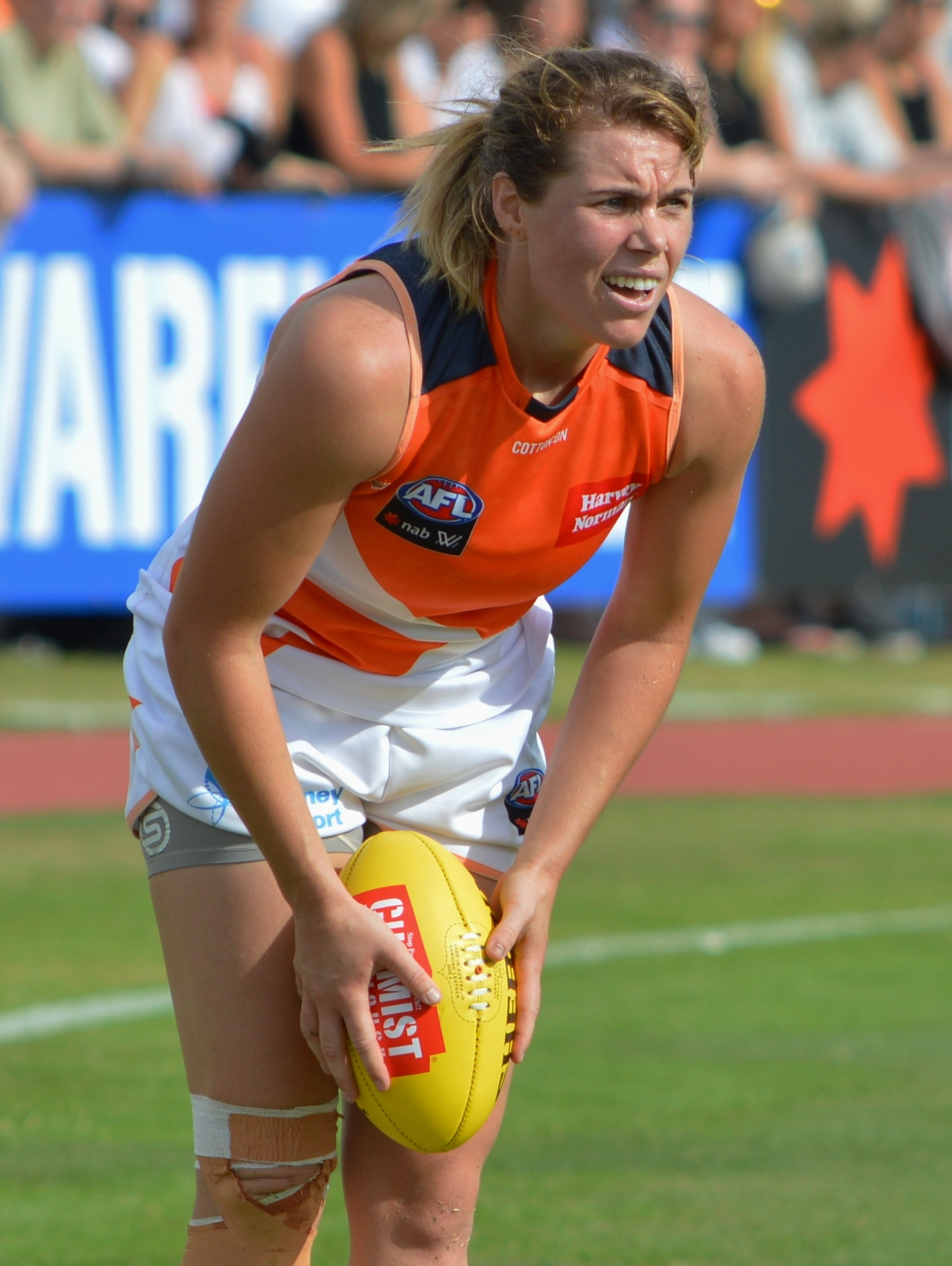
- Barclay playing for Greater Western Sydney in 2018

Personal information
- Born: 18 February 1991; New Zealand
- Died: 12 October 2020 (aged 29); Chidlow, Western Australia
- Original team: Swan Districts (WAWFL)
- Draft: No. 65, 2016 national draft
- Debut: Round 1, 2017, Greater Western Sydney vs. Adelaide, at Thebarton Oval
- Height: 170 cm (5 ft 7 in)
- Position: Utility

Playing career
Years	Club	Games (Goals)
2017–2020	Greater Western Sydney	23 (11)

Jacinda Barclay (18 February 1991 – 12 October 2020) was an Australian sportswoman who played baseball, American football and Australian rules football at high levels. She represented the Australian national team in five Women's Baseball World Cups and played professional football for the Chicago Bliss in the Legends Football League and Greater Western Sydney in the AFL Women's (AFLW). Citing her success across multiple sports, The Sydney Morning Herald called Barclay "the Sonny Bill Williams of women's sport" in 2016.

== Early life ==
Jacinda Barclay was born on 18 February 1991 to New Zealander parents and grew up in Chidlow, Western Australia (a rural locality in the Perth Hills), and attended La Salle College. She began playing Australian rules football at age 12, before deciding to focus on baseball as a teenager.

== Career ==
=== Baseball ===
Barclay spent her junior baseball career on boys' teams. A right-arm pitcher, she made her state debut for Western Australia at the age of 15 (at the 2006 national championships), and the following year was included in the national squad for the first time. Barclay represented the Australian national team (the Emeralds) in the 2008 World Cup in Japan at the age of 17. She won a silver medal at the 2010 World Cup in Venezuela, and played in three more world cups (Canada 2012, Japan 2014, and South Korea 2016).

=== American football ===
Barclay began playing American football in 2012, while living in Chicago. Her initial attempts to win a contract in the Legends Football League were thwarted by her visa status. Barclay later signed with the New South Wales Surge for the inaugural 2013–14 season of LFL Australia (the competition's only season so far). She played as a quarterback, leading her team to a title and winning an award as the best offensive player in the league. In 2016, Barclay was scouted by the Chicago Bliss in the main LFL competition in the United States. She won a championship in her first season.

=== Australian rules football ===
Barclay began playing Australian football at the age of twelve, although she gave it up for a period in order to concentrate on baseball. At amateur level, she played for periods with Swan Districts in the West Australian Women's Football League (WAWFL) and the UNSW Eastern Suburbs Stingrays in the Sydney Women's AFL competition. Barclay represented both Western Australia and NSW/ACT at the AFL Women's National Championship. She was drafted to Greater Western Sydney with the 65th pick overall in the 2016 AFL Women's draft, and made her senior debut for the club in round one of the 2017 season, against Adelaide at Thebarton Oval.

After playing six games in 2017, Barclay signed for the 2018 season with Greater Western Sydney during the trade period in May 2017.

==== AFL Women's statistics ====
Legend
G	Goals	K	Kicks	D	Disposals	T	Tackles
B	Behinds	H	Handballs	M	Marks

Season	Team	No.	Games	Totals							Averages (per game)							Votes
Season	Team	No.	Games	G	B	K	H	D	M	T	G	B	K	H	D	M	T	Votes
2017	Greater Western Sydney	34	6	4	3	27	9	36	13	10	0.7	0.5	4.5	1.5	6.0	2.2	1.7	0
2018	Greater Western Sydney	34	7	4	3	41	31	72	23	20	0.6	0.4	5.9	4.4	10.3	3.3	2.9	0
2019	Greater Western Sydney	34	5	2	2	19	21	40	6	5	0.4	0.4	3.8	4.2	8.0	1.2	1.0	0
2020	Greater Western Sydney	34	5	1	1	23	17	40	11	12	0.2	0.4	4.6	3.4	8.0	2.2	2.4	0
Career			23	11	9	110	78	188	53	47	0.5	0.4	4.8	3.4	8.2	2.3	2.0	0

== Personal life and death ==
In 2016, Barclay was working in the professional diving industry as an assistant life support technician and had aspirations to become a sports psychologist.

Barclay was found dead at her Perth home on 12 October 2020. Her death was implied to have been a suicide. Barclay was the first contact sportswoman in Australia to donate her brain to the Australian Sports Brain Bank. Researchers uncovered neurological degradation to her cerebral white matter, similar to that found in the brains of former American football players. Damage of this type is thought to be the result of multiple head injuries from contact sports and is linked to an increased risk of suicide, and is also known as chronic traumatic encephalopathy.

In April 2021, Barclay's family and friends interviewed with The Guardian about her life and death. Remembered as a strong and ambitious figure in women's sports, Barclay was also distressed by the different pay scales and recognition accorded to male and female athletes. Barclay, who had been told she would easily have earned $200,000 a year as a male athlete, was paid $23,059 in 2020 as a tier two player for the Greater Western Sydney Giants women's team. Her struggle to succeed in a business with a far lower ceiling for women than men, combined with her head trauma, was ascribed a factor in her death by her confidants.

== See also ==
- List of players who have converted from one football code to another
