= Tamara Holmes =

American baseball player

Personal information
- Born: June 2, 1974 (age 52) Berkeley, California, U.S.
- Height: 5 ft 9 in (1.75 m)

Sport
- College team: California Golden Bears

Tamara Holmes
Medal record

Women's baseball

Representing United States

Women's Baseball World Cup
| Gold medal – first place | 2004 Canada | Team competition |
| Gold medal – first place | 2006 Taiwan | Team competition |
| Bronze medal – third place | 2008 Japan | Team competition |
| Bronze medal – third place | 2010 Venezuela | Team competition |
| Silver medal – second place | 2012 Canada | Team competition |
| Silver medal – second place | 2014 Japan | Team competition |

Pan American Games
| Gold medal – first place | 2015 Toronto | Team competition |

Tamara Holmes (born June 2, 1974) is a baseball player who competed with the Colorado Silver Bullets and the United States women's national baseball team which won a gold medal at the 2015 Pan American Games. Heading into 2015, she has hit more home runs than any other women's baseball player.

== Playing career ==
Holmes grew up in Albany, California. Holmes' first experience with baseball occurred at Albany Little League in California. In 1986, she was named to the Little League All-Star Team. She moved to Berkeley, California after her sophomore year of high school and stopped playing baseball. Holmes accepted a volleyball scholarship to compete with the Cal Golden Bears.

In 1996, she joined the Colorado Silver Bullets during their final season of play. On May 15, 1996, she hit the first home run in Silver Bullets history. It occurred at the University of Georgia's Foley Field against the Atlanta Mustangs, and it was also an inside-the-park grand slam. In 2004, she played for the United States at the inaugural IBAF Women's World Cup. At the 2010 Women's World Cup, Holmes hit three home runs, two of which were grand slams. She was recognized as the Offensive Player of the Tournament. On the 2014 World Cup roster, she was the only former Silver Bullets player still with Team USA.

== Personal ==
Her older sister Andrea ran track in high school and accepted a scholarship to Boise State. Holmes graduated from the University of California in 2001 and was employed as a firefighter. Holmes is co-owner of a CrossFit and Olympic lifting gym in Oakland, California. She got married on July 1, 2016 to Carrie Holmes of Sacramento.

== Awards and honors ==
- 2010 Women's World Cup of Baseball Home Run Trophy
- 2010 Women's World Cup of Baseball Offensive Player of the Tournament
- 2012 Women's World Cup of Baseball All-Tournament Team

== Bibliography ==
- Ring, Jennifer (2015). "Chapter 4: Tamara Holmes". A Game of Their Own: Voices of Contemporary Women in Baseball. Nebraska: University of Nebraska Press. pp. 53–70. ISBN 978-0803244801.
