= Ashley Stephenson =

Canadian ice hockey and baseball player

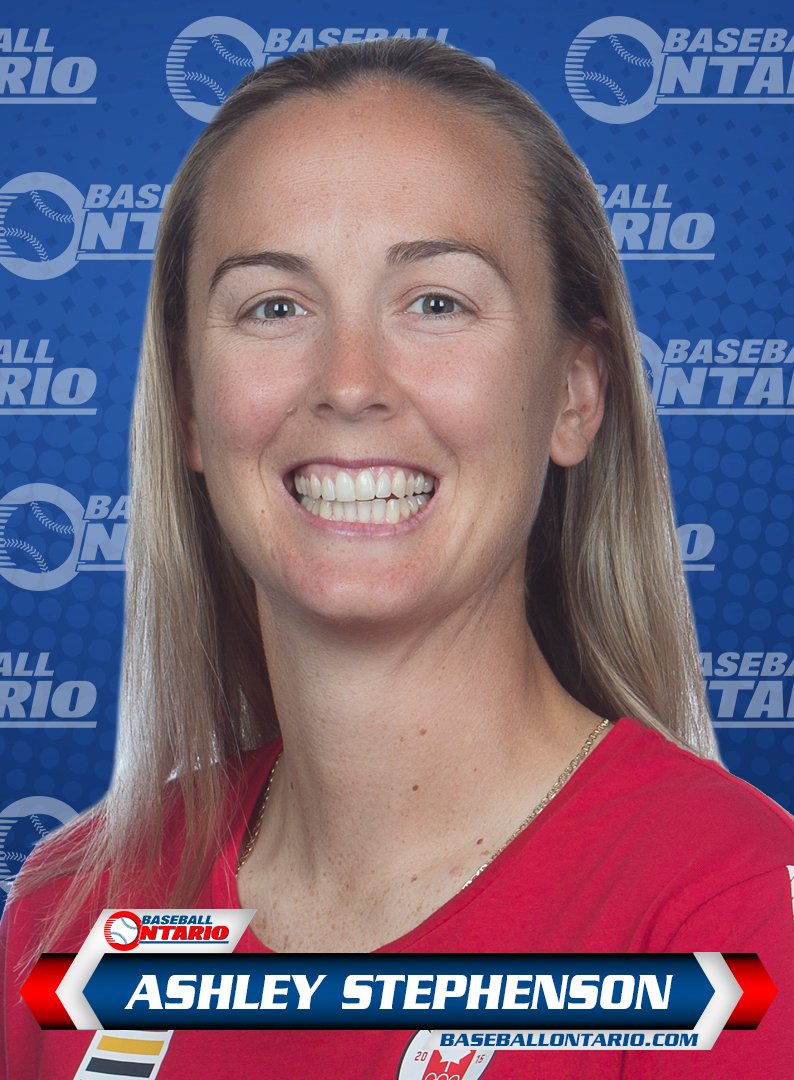
- Born: November 22, 1982 (age 44) Mississauga, Ontario, Canada
- Height: 5 ft 7 in (170 cm)
- Weight: 140 lb (64 kg; 10 st 0 lb)
- Played for: Burlington Barracudas (CWHL); Mississauga Chiefs (CWHL); Brampton Thunder (NWHL); Laurier Golden Hawks (OUA)
- Playing career: 2000–2012
Medal record
Women's ice hockey
Representing Ontario
Esso women's hockey nationals
| Gold medal – first place | 2008 Charlottetown | Tournament |
Women's baseball
Representing Canada
Women's Baseball World Cup
| Bronze medal – third place | 2005 Canada | Team competition |
| Bronze medal – third place | 2006 Taiwan | Team competition |
| Silver medal – second place | 2008 Japan | Team competition |
| Bronze medal – third place | 2012 Canada | Team competition |
Pan American Games
| Silver medal – second place | 2015 Toronto | Team competition |
- Baseball career

Member of the Canadian

Baseball Hall of Fame
- Induction: 2024

Ashley Stephenson (born November 22, 1982) is a former two-sport athlete from Ontario who played baseball for Canada women's national baseball team and ice hockey in the original NWHL and the CWHL. She won a silver medal at the 2015 Pan American Games.

== Playing career ==
=== Hockey ===
Stephenson played her university hockey with the Wilfrid Laurier Golden Hawks women's ice hockey program from 2000 through 2005. Having won four Ontario University Athletics conference titles (2002, 2004–06), she was part of the Golden Hawks team that claimed the CIS National Championship in 2005.

In addition, she was recognized as the Most Valuable Player of the CIS National Championship tournament. Recognized as a CIS First-Team All-Canadian in 2006, she was inducted into the Golden Hawks Hall of Fame in 2011.

A member of the Brampton Thunder from 2005 to 2007, she played for the Mississauga Chiefs from 2007 to 2010. Among the highlights of her time with the Chiefs, she competed in the inaugural CWHL season (2007–08) and earned a gold medal at the 2008 Esso women's hockey nationals.

Claimed by the Thunder in the 2010 CWHL Draft, she would join the Burlington Barracudas. Competing with the Barracudas from 2010 to 2012, she was part of their final season (2011–12). The final goal of her career stood as the game-winning goal in a December 18, 2011 match against the Toronto Furies, which would also prove to be the final win in Barracudas franchise history.

After suffering her seventh concussion, Stephenson was forced to retire from hockey. Heading into the 2012–13 CWHL season, she served as an assistant coach to Sommer West with the Toronto Furies.

=== Baseball ===
Stephenson and teammate Kate Psota have both participated with the Canadian national women's baseball team in every IBAF World Cup between 2004 and 2018. The team claimed six medals, four bronze (2004, 2006, 2012 and 2018) and two silver (2008 and 2016). At the 2008 Women's Baseball World Cup, she led all players with five stolen bases.

During the 2010 International Series in Cary, North Carolina, Ashley logged a .444 batting average as Canada prevailed in 4 out of 6 games against the United States. In 2011, she would be recognized for her contributions to the national team as the recipient of Baseball Canada's Jimmy Rattlesnake Award, which in recent years was renamed in her honour.

During 2015, she was one of three women, including teammate Autumn Mills, who served as instructors at the Toronto Blue Jays Baseball Academy.

In 2019 she retired from international baseball as an active player although has continued as a coach.

== Coaching career ==
In 2023, Stephenson was hired as a coach for the minor league Vancouver Canadians. In 2026, Stephenson was named bench coach of the Dunedin Blue Jays the Toronto Blue Jays Single-A affiliate.

== Awards and honours ==
=== Hockey ===
- 2002-03 OUA Women's Hockey Second Team All-Star
- 2003-04 OUA Women's Hockey First Team All-Star
- 2004-05 OUA Women's Hockey First Team All-Star
- 2005-06 OUA Women's Hockey First Team All-Star
- 2004-05 CIS Women's Hockey Championship Tournament MVP
- 2004-05 CIS Women's Hockey Second Team All-Canadian
- 2004-05 CIS Women's Hockey Championship Tournament All-Star
- 2005-06 CIS Women's Hockey Championship Tournament All-Star
- CIS First-Team All-Canadian (2006)
- 2005-06 Wilfrid Laurier Golden Hawks Team Most Valuable Player
- Golden Hawks Hall of Fame in 2011

=== Baseball ===
- Canadian National Women's Baseball Team MVP Award (2005, 2008)
- 2008 IBAF World Cup Tournament All-Star (Third Base)
- 2011 Baseball Canada Jimmy Rattlesnake Award
