= Donna Mills (baseball) =

American baseball player

Medal record

Women's baseball

Representing United States

Women's Baseball World Cup
Gold medal – first place	2004 Canada	2004 Tournament
Gold medal – first place	2006 Taiwan	2006 Tournament
Bronze medal – third place	2008 Japan	2008 Tournament

Donna Mills (born July 13, 1973) is a baseball player who competed with the United States women's national baseball team.

== Playing career ==
=== Baseball ===
As a child, she played in the Pine Hill Little League. In 1999, she was invited to play with the Boston Blue Sox, an all-women's baseball team.

With the United States national women's team, she was a starting infielder at the 2004, 2006 and 2008 Women's World Cup of Baseball.

Recognized with MVP honors at the 2006 World Cup, she donated her batting gloves to the Baseball Hall of Fame in Cooperstown, New York. Said gloves are on permanent display at an exhibition titled "Diamonds and Dreams".

In 2011, she was invited by USA Baseball to be one of eight coaches at the 2011 Friendship Series, held at their national training complex in Cary, North Carolina.

=== Softball ===
Playing softball for the Peabody Raiders, the team qualified in 1990 and 1991 for the Junior Olympics Nationals in Lodi, California. She earned an NCAA scholarship to play softball at Division II University of Massachusetts Lowell.

== Awards and honors ==
- Most Valuable Player, 2006 International Baseball Federation Women's World Cup of Baseball
- Lynn Vocational Technical Institute Athletics Hall of Fame (2007 inductee)

== Personal ==
She gave birth to a daughter named Gianna. Currently, she is employed as a court officer for the District Court of Massachusetts.
