= Australia women's national baseball team =

Information
- Country: Australia
- Federation: Australian Baseball Federation
- Confederation: Baseball Confederation of Oceania
- Manager: (Australia) Jason Pospishil

WBSC ranking
- Current: 7 ▲3 (9 September 2026)

Women's World Cup
- Appearances: 9 (first in 2004)
- Best result: (silver) 2nd (1 time, in 2010)

The Australian women's national baseball team, nicknamed the Emeralds, represents Australia in international women's baseball tournaments and competitions. The team is controlled by the Australian Baseball Federation, which is represented in the Baseball Confederation of Oceania (BCO). They are the only team in Oceania to be formally ranked by the International Baseball Federation (IBAF), and are the 3rd ranked women's baseball team in the world. The Emeralds have been in existence since 2001, when the first ever squad was selected from the 2001 National Women’s Championships, held in Sydney. They compete in the biennial IBAF Women’s Baseball World Cup.

The team has competed at all nine Women's Baseball World Cups, medaling at the 2010 and 2014 tournaments.

== Roster ==
=== 2023 World Cup Roster ===
Australia roster – 2023 Women's Baseball World Cup - Group A
Active roster		Coaching staff
Pitchers Right-handed pitchers: Allie Bebbere; Maddison Erwin; Meaghan Haggart; Abbey Kelly; Ashley Patton; Left-handed pitchers: Genevieve Beacom	Catchers: Maddison Heath; Carly Moore; Infielders: Caitlin Eynon; Abbey Kelly; Shae Lillywhite; Abbey McLellan; Jordan Richardson; Maddison Tabrett; Outfielders: Kelsey Brennan; Lili Cavanagh; Morgan Doty; Ticara Geldenhuis; Claire O'Sullivan	Manager: Jason Pospishil; Coaches: Samantha Hamilton; Lisa Norrie; Chris Oxspring

=== 2020 World Cup Roster ===
No Roster had been named due to postponement of the World Cup because of the COVID pandemic. The World Cup was originally scheduled for Monterey, Mexico, and then changed to Tijuana, Mexico.

=== 2018 World Cup Roster ===
Australia roster – 2018 Women's Baseball World Cup
Active roster		Coaching staff
Pitchers Right-handed pitchers: Kaila Borgomastro; Sinead Flanigan; Brittany Hepburn; Abbey Kelly; Kim McMillan; Laura Neads; Maddison Tabrett; Left-handed pitchers: Amy Collins	Catchers: Tahnee Lovering; Abbey McLellan; Infielders: Olivia Bannon; Bronwyn Gell; Natalie House; Shae Lillywhite; Taylah Welch; Outfielders: Leslie Anglin; Morgan Doty; Chelsea Forkin; Tammy McMillan; Elodie O'Sullivan	Manager: Simone Wearne; Coaches: Risa Nakashima; Anthony Bennett; Lisa Norrie
25 February 2019

=== 2016 World Cup Roster ===
Australia roster – 2016 Women's Baseball World Cup
Active roster		Coaching staff
Pitchers Right-handed pitchers: Jacinda Barclay; Tabatha Callander; Linda Gough; Brittany Hepburn; Abbey Kelly; Kim McMillan; Jordan Richardson; Left-handed pitchers: Amy Collins	Catchers: Tahnee Lovering; Infielders: Olivia Bannon; Bronwyn Gell; Kim McMillan; Laura Neads; Claire O'Sullivan; Shae Lillywhite; Karina Connors; Outfielders: Leslie Anglin; Morgan Doty; Chelsea Forkin; Erin Fox; Tammy McMillan	Manager: Simone Wearne; Coaches: Matt Williams; Anthony Bennett; Lisa Norrie

=== 2014 World Cup Roster ===
Pitchers

- Kim McMillan
- Melinda Latimer
- Stephanie Gaynor
- Brittany Hepburn
- Maddison Lenard
- Lauren McGrath
- Laura Neads
- Jacinda Barclay
- Georgia Blair
- Taylah Welch
- Amy Collins

Outfield

- Amy McCann
- Leigh Godfrey
- Rachael Higgins

Infield

- Shae Lillywhite
- Christina Kreppold
- Natalie Rawlings
- Bronwyn Gell
- Katie Gaynor

Catcher

- Tahnee Lovering

=== 2012 World Cup Roster ===
Australia roster – 2012 Women's Baseball World Cup
Active roster
Pitchers Right-handed pitchers: Jacinda Barclay; Stephanie Gaynor; Brittany Hepburn; Kim McMillan; Laura Neads; Maddison Lenard; Tayla Welch; Tahlia Wellington; Erin Collins; Left-handed pitchers	Catchers: Tahnee Lovering; Amanda Torrington; Infielders: Katie Gaynor; Bronwyn Gell; Christina Kreppold; Shae Lillywhite; Taylah Welch; Outfielders: Sam Hamilton; Melinda Latimer; Amy McCann; Stacey Saggus; Lauren McGrath

=== 2010 World Cup Roster ===
Australia roster – 2010 Women's Baseball World Cup
Players		Coaching staff
Pitchers: (Western Australia); 17 Jacinda Barclay; (Victoria (state)); 15 Sinead Flanigan; (New South Wales); 44 Melinda Latimer; (New South Wales); 32 Kim McMillan; (New South Wales); 60 Lauren Murphy; (New South Wales); 20 Laura Neads; (Queensland); 22 Taylah Welch; (Victoria (state)); 7 Kathy Welsh	Catchers: (New South Wales); 87 Tahnee Lovering; (Victoria (state)); 47 Clare Whittam; Infielders: (New South Wales); 8 Katie Gaynor; (Victoria (state)); 53 Bronwyn Gell; (Western Australia); 18 Christina Kreppold; (Victoria (state)); 26 Shae Lillywhite; (Western Australia); 24 Natalie Rawlings; (New South Wales); 11 Brooke Shiels; Outfielders: (New South Wales); 12 Janna Loudoun; (New South Wales); 2 Tahlia McDonald; (Victoria (state)); 31 Amy McCann; Utility players: (Victoria (state)); 29 Samantha Hamilton	Manager: John Gaynor; Coaches: Tim Ballard (pitching coach); Dominic Ruggierio (assistant coach); Other staff: Anne-Maree Adams (Executive Officer); Joni Ralph-Wilkie (Best Mum Ever!!<3) (physiotherapist)

== Coaching staff ==
- Head Coach – Simone Wearne
- Assistant Coach – Dean White
- Assistant Coach – Narelle Gosstray
- Assistant Coach – Luke Hughes
- Pitching Coach – Graeme Lloyd
- Physio – Joni Ralph-Wilkie
- Executive Officer – David Nagy
- Technical Analyst – Yasunori Sato

== World ranking ==
In August 2009 the International Baseball Federation created a ranking system so that the nations involved in international competition could be compared independently. Teams receive points based on the position they finish at the end of World Cup tournaments. Only results at the previous three tournaments years are used, so points are added and removed over time. Points are also weighted so that more recent tournaments have a greater impact on the rankings.

Date Released	Tournament	Tournament Result	Ranking	Points	Position Above			Position Below		
Date Released	Tournament	Tournament Result	Ranking	Points	Rank	Team	Points Difference	Rank	Team	Points Difference
4 September 2010	2010 World Cup	2nd	3rd	140.00	2nd	United States	+13.33	4th	Canada	−6.67
13 August 2009	2008 World Cup^{*}	4th	4th	100.00	3rd	Canada	+40.00	5th	Chinese Taipei	−20.00

* – When the rankings were first released, the 2008 World Cup was the most recent tournament completed that had any bearing on the rankings themselves.

== Women's World Cup ==
Of the twelve nations to be represented at the IBAF Women's Baseball World Cup, Australia is one of five teams to have participated in all four of them. To date its best result was in the most recent tournament held in 2010, in which Australia placed 2nd. Previously, the team had finished fourth in each of the tournaments, with medals being shared between Canada, Japan and United States.

At least one Australian has been named to each of the All-Star teams selected at the end of the respective tournaments.

- 2004: Chelsea Forkin and Katie Gaynor
- 2006: Simone Wearne, Shae Lillywhite and Amy McCann
- 2008: Angela Catford
- 2010: Laura Neads, Christina Kreppold and Kim McMillan
- 2016: Tahnee Lovering, Tammy McMillan

Women's Baseball World Cup record
Year	Round	Position	W	L	RS	RA
(Canada) 2004	Semifinals	4th	2	4	25	31
(Taiwan) 2006	Semifinals	4th	4	2	–	–
(Japan) 2008	Group stage	4th	2	4	36	30
(Venezuela) 2010	Finals	2nd	6	3	72	49
(Canada) 2012	Semifinals	4th	4	5	82	64
(Japan) 2014	Round 2	3rd	4	2	46	28
(South Korea) 2016	Round 2	5th	3	4	47	36
(United States) 2018	Round 1	7th	5	3	–	–
(Canada) 2024	Group stage	8th	2	3	36	35
Total	Finals	9/9	32	30	–	–

Australian Women's Baseball World Cup Record by Opponent
Opponent	Tournaments Met	W–L Record	Largest Victory		Largest Defeat		Current Streak
Opponent	Tournaments Met	W–L Record	Score	Tournament	Score	Tournament	Current Streak
Canada	4	2–3	9–4	(Chinese Taipei) 2006	6–1	(Venezuela) 2010	L2
Chinese Taipei	4	4–0	12–0 (F/6)	(Japan) 2008	–		W4
Cuba	2	2–0	6–2	(Venezuela) 2010	–		W2
Hong Kong	1	1–0	22–2 (F/5)	(Chinese Taipei) 2006	–		W1
India	1	1–0	15–0 (F/5)	(Japan) 2008	–		W1
Japan	4	2–3	7–1	(Canada) 2004	13–3 (F/5)	(Venezuela) 2010	L1
Netherlands	1	1–0	16–3 (F/5)	(Venezuela) 2010	–		W1
United States	4	1–5	19–6 (F/6)	(Venezuela) 2010	11–1 (F/6)	(Japan) 2008	W1
Venezuela	1	1–1	12–2	(Venezuela) 2010	8–1	(Venezuela) 2010	W1
Overall	4	15–12	Against HKG		Against USA & JPN		L1
Overall	4	15–12	22–2 (F/5)	(Chinese Taipei) 2006	11–1 (F/6) 13–3 (F/5)	(Japan) 2008 (Venezuela) 2010	L1

== See also ==
- Women's baseball in Australia
