= Nicole Luchanski =

Canadian baseball player (born 1989)

Medal record

Women's baseball

Representing Canada

Women's Baseball World Cup
Bronze medal – third place	2006 Taiwan	Team competition
Silver medal – second place	2008 Japan	Team competition
Bronze medal – third place	2012 Canada	Team competition

Pan American Games
Silver medal – second place	2015 Toronto	Team competition

Nicole Luchanski (born 20 December 1989, in Edmonton, Alberta) is a Canadian baseball player. She is a member of the Canada women's national baseball team which won a silver medal at the 2015 Pan American Games.

== Playing career ==
=== Baseball ===
She has competed with the Canadian national team in five IBAF Women’s World Cups (2006, 2008, 2010, 2012, 2014). In the bronze medal game of the 2012 Women’s World Cup, a 17–13 victory against Australia, Luchanski hit the first home run of the event. Of note, it was an inside the park home run, making Luchanski the only player at the event to hit a home run.

In 2014, she competed with Team Alberta, winning a gold medal at the Senior Women’s Invitational National Championships in Canada. She also had the opportunity to train with Hall of Fame second baseman Roberto Alomar at Whalley Athletic Park in Surrey, British Columbia. It was part of the second day of training camp leading up to the 2014 Women's World Cup.

== Awards and honours ==
- 2010 Jimmy Rattlesnake Award
- 2012 IBAF Women’s World Cup of Baseball All-Tournament Team

== Personal ==
She graduated from the University of Alberta in 2013 with a Bachelor of Science in Forestry.
