= Kate Psota =

Canadian baseball and ice hockey player

- Born: April 30, 1986 (age 39) Burlington, Ontario, Canada
- Height: 5 ft 7 in (170 cm)
- Weight: 155 lb (70 kg; 11 st 1 lb)
- PWHL OUA team: Stoney Creek Jr. Sabres; Laurier Golden Hawks (2005-10)
- Playing career: 2005–2010

Medal record

Women's baseball

Representing Canada

Women's Baseball World Cup
Bronze medal – third place	2005 Canada	Team competition
Bronze medal – third place	2006 Taiwan	Team competition
Silver medal – second place	2008 Japan	Team competition
Bronze medal – third place	2012 Canada	Team competition

Pan American Games
Silver medal – second place	2015 Toronto	Team competition

Katherine "Kate" Psota (born 30 April 1986) is a Canadian former competitor with the Wilfrid Laurier Golden Hawks women's ice hockey program. She was a member of the Canada women's national baseball team that won a silver medal at the 2015 Pan American Games.

== Career ==
=== Hockey ===
Psota played collegiate hockey for the Laurier Golden Hawks from 2006–10, she won an OUA conference title in every season. Earning CIS Academic All-Canadian honours in 2009, her final game with the Golden Hawks was the bronze medal game at the 2010 CIS National Championships, a 4-0 victory against Saint Mary’s.

=== Baseball ===
Psota and teammate Ashley Stephenson have both participated with the Canadian national women’s baseball team in every IBAF World Cup since 2004. Between 2004 and 2014, they have claimed four medals in six tournaments, three bronze and one silver medal which was attained in 2008. Earning Canadian national women’s baseball team MVP honours in 2009 and 2010, she was also recognized as a World Cup All-Star in 2010 and 2012.

== Awards and honours ==
=== Hockey ===
- 2009 CIS Academic All-Canadian
- 2010 Bronze Medal, CIS National Championships

=== Baseball ===
- Canadian National Women’s Baseball Team MVP Award (2009, 2010)
- 2010 IBAF World Cup Tournament All-Star (First Base)
- 2011 Jimmy Rattlesnake Award
- 2012 IBAF World Cup Tournament All-Star (First Base)

== Personal ==
In 2010, she graduated from Wilfrid Laurier University with a Bachelor of Arts in geography and kinesiology. The following year, Psota had obtained a Bachelor of Arts in education.
