= Angela Catford =

Australian baseball player (born 1978)

Angela Catford (born 13 January 1978 in Castle Hill, New South Wales) is an outfielder for the Australia women's national baseball team.

In the 2008 Women's Baseball World Cup she was named as an outfielder in the All-Star team. She also won the batting award at the 2004 national women's championships which led to her selection in the national team for the 2004 Women's World Series and also played in the inaugural 2006 Women's Baseball World Cup.
