= Meggie Meidlinger =

American baseball player

Los Angeles Queens – No. 13
- Pitcher
- Born: Megan Elizabeth Meidlinger; November 9, 1987 (age 38)
- Bats: Right Throws: Right

WPBL debut
- Aug 1, 2026, for the Los Angeles Queens
- Stats at Baseball Reference

Teams
- Los Angeles Queens (2026–present)

Career highlights and awards
- WPBL Champion (2026)
Medals
Women's baseball
Representing United States
Women's Baseball World Cup
Gold medal – first place	2006 Taiwan	Team
Silver medal – second place	2024 Canada	Team
Bronze medal – third place	2008 Japan	Team

Megan Elizabeth "Meggie" Meidlinger (born November 9, 1987) is an American professional baseball pitcher for the Los Angeles Queens of the Women's Pro Baseball League (WPBL). She has been a member of the United States women's national baseball team since 2006.

== Playing career ==
Pitching at Dominion High School in Sterling, Virginia, she threw a complete game in a 10-0 victory over Briar Woods. She became the first female in the state's history to pitch a perfect men's varsity game. She was also the first female to win a men's varsity baseball game in the state. For her efforts, she was recognized in Sports Illustrated's Faces in the Crowd segment.

While she played in high school, she was recruited by Adriane Adler to play for the East Coast Yankees. She would also play for the New England Women's Red Sox and the Chicago Pioneers.

=== National team ===
As a pitcher and first baseman, she was part of the Team USA roster that captured the gold medal at the 2006 Women's Baseball World Cup. She was one of four teenaged players to qualify for the Team USA roster in 2006.

At the 2008 Women's Baseball World Cup, Meidlinger made three relief appearances and won bronze with the rest of the national team. She was then absent from the roster until 2016, since which she has pitched in each World Cup.

At the 2024 Women's Baseball World Cup, she gave up no runs in three appearances, and won the silver medal with the rest of the national team.

=== Los Angeles Queens ===
Meidlinger was drafted by the Los Angeles Queens in the 2025 inaugural draft of the Women's Pro Baseball League, which is set to begin play in August 2026. She was selected fifteenth overall in the first round, and later signed with the team.

In the 2026 WPBL season, Meidlinger boasted both the lowest regular season earned run average (1.83) and WHIP (.98) of all league pitchers.

== Personal life ==
Meidlinger studied architecture at Virginia Tech, and currently practices at a firm in Atlanta.
