= Samantha Magalas =

Samantha Magalas (born April 9, 1982) became the first woman in Canadian history to play for a men's university baseball team. Samantha became the starting first baseman for York University in Toronto in 2004, and competed for the rest of the season. She also became the school's first athlete to compete on both male and female sports teams, suiting up for the York University women's hockey team from 2001–2004.

Magalas was a player on the Canada women's national baseball team from 2004–2009 where she competed in three Women's Baseball World Cups, and won one silver and two bronze medals. In 2004, she earned a Top Ten Player award while playing in the Women's Baseball World Series in Japan, and was named an All-Star at the Women's World Cup in Edmonton, Canada, earning the honour of best first baseman. Following her playing career, Magalas joined the coaching staff from 2010 to 2015 coaching in two World Cups. She was also Canada's only female coach for the women's baseball team at the 2015 Pan Am Games in Toronto.

Magalas was born in Oakville, Ontario and currently lives in Windsor, where she works for the city of Windsor. Previously, she worked at OUA Ontario University Athletics as a high performance sport convenor. She also runs her own private baseball academy and continues to coach with the Toronto Blue Jays Baseball Academy.
