= Meggie =

Meggie is a feminine given name and nickname. It may refer to:

== People ==
- Margherita Meggie Albanesi (1899–1923), British actress
- Megan Meggie Dougherty Howard (born 1995), American soccer player
- Meggie Meidlinger (fl. 2006–2008), American baseball player
- Margarita Meggie Ochoa (born 1990), Filipino jujutsu practitioner

== Fictional characters ==
- Meghan Meggie Cleary, the protagonist of the novel The Thorn Birds, by Australian author Colleen McCullough, and its adaptations
- Meggie Folchart, the protagonist of four fantasy novels by German author Cornelia Funke
- Meggie McClaine, in the soap opera The Young and the Restless, played by Sean Young

== See also ==
- Maggie
