= Amy McCann =

Amy McCann may refer to:

- Amy McCann (baseball) (born 1978), Australian baseball player
- Amy McCann (footballer) (born 1983), English-born Northern Irish footballer
