= Olivia Pichardo =

American baseball player (born 2004)

Brown Bears – No. 19
- Outfielder / Pitcher
- Born: February 26, 2004 (age 22); Forest Hills, New York, U.S.
- Bats: Left Throws: Right

Career highlights and awards
- First woman to play in Division I college baseball
Medals
Women's baseball
Representing United States
Silver medal – second place	2024 Thunder Bay	Team

Olivia Whitney Pichardo (born February 26, 2004) is an American baseball player for the Brown University Bears and U.S. women's national team. She is the first woman to play NCAA Division I baseball.

== Early life ==
Pichardo was born in Queens, New York. She began playing baseball in kindergarten and played varsity baseball in high school. She also played on the Next Level Baseball travel team, as well as the Atlantic Collegiate Baseball League's New York Crush. She also interned for the New York Mets in their amateur scouting department.

== College career ==
In November 2022, as a freshman, Pichardo became the first woman named to an NCAA Division I baseball roster when she made the Brown Bears team as a walk-on. In March 2023, she became the first woman to play in a Division I baseball game, when she pinch hit. She appeared in one game that season. That summer, she became the first woman to hit a home run while playing in the Hamptons Collegiate Baseball League. She played for the Sag Harbor Whalers. In 21 games, she had a .083/.344/.156 slash line, with 16 walks and 18 strikeouts. She pitched in three games, allowing 6 unearned runs in 3 innings.

Pichardo played in one game for Brown in 2024, getting hit by a pitch and scoring her first run in a loss to Princeton on April 6. That summer, she played for the Dubois County Bombers of the Prospect League, the first woman on that team’s roster. She batted .128/.340/.205 with 1 home run, a 10th-inning game winner, in 16 games.

In 2025, Pichardo batted 0-for-3 in three games for Brown. She played that summer for the Piney Woods TimberHogs of the Mid-America League alongside U.S. women's national teammate Remi Schaber. Hall of Famer Pedro Martínez, whose son played in the collegiate summer league, said Pichardo and Schaber were "talented individuals. They have more to show than people think.”

In April 2026, Pichardo became the first woman to pitch in a Division I baseball game, pitching for Brown in a victory over Cornell University.

Pichardo graduated from Brown in 2026. The same year, she announced her decision to attend University of California, Berkeley as a grad transfer. For her final year of eligibility, she will play for the California Golden Bears softball team.

== International career ==
In 2022, Pichardo played for the United States women's national baseball team in a five-game series against Canada. She played as both an outfielder and pitcher. She made four starts in the outfield and one as a pitcher.

In the group stage of the 2024 Women's Baseball World Cup in 2023, Pichardo hit a home run against Canada and batted .333 in three games while throwing 2 scoreless innings. she led all pitchers in the World Cup finals with 8 strikeouts, as the U.S. finished second to Japan. As a hitter, she batted .214 with a sacrifice fly. Her fastball reached 85 miles per hour.

== Personal life ==
Pichardo has a younger sister. Her father grew up in the Dominican Republic, and her mother is Chinese-American.

Pichardo threw out the ceremonial first pitch at a Boston Red Sox game on May 3, 2023, during Asian American Pacific Islander Night at Fenway Park.
