= 2025 Women's Baseball Pan American Championship =

Tournament details
- Country: Venezuela
- City: La Guaira
- Dates: 20 – 26 September
- Teams: 5
- Defending champions: Venezuela

Final positions
- Champions: Venezuela
- Runners-up: Mexico
- Third place: Cuba
- Fourth place: Nicaragua

Tournament statistics
- Games played: 14

The 2025 Women's Baseball Pan American Championship is a 5th Women's Baseball Pan American Championship tournament which was held from 20 to 26 September 2025 in La Guaira, Venezuela.

The tournament served as the qualifiers for the 2027 Women's Baseball World Cup. The top three teams qualified for the World Cup.

Venezuela defeated Mexico 9-8 to win their second consecutive tournament.

== Venues ==
The tournament was held at Estadio Fórum La Guaira.

== Participants ==
- Argentina
- Cuba
- Mexico
- Nicaragua
- Venezuela (hosts)

== Opening round ==
Pos	Team	Pld	W	L	RF	RA	RD	PCT	GB	Qualification
1	Venezuela (H)	4	4	0	40	4	+36	1.000	—	Advance to Semifinal
2	Cuba	4	3	1	16	16	0	.750	1	Advance to Semifinal
3	Mexico	4	2	2	31	15	+16	.500	2	Advance to Semifinal
4	Nicaragua	4	1	3	14	20	−6	.250	3	Advance to Semifinal
5	Argentina	4	0	4	4	50	−46	.000	4	

Source: WBSC Americas
(H) Hosts

Date	Local time	Road team	Score	Home team	Inn.	Venue	Game duration	Attendance	Boxscore
Sep 20, 2025	11:30	Mexico	14–0	Argentina	F/5	Estadio Fórum La Guaira	2:00	100	Boxscore
Sep 20, 2025	19:30	Venezuela	11–0	Cuba	F/5	Estadio Fórum La Guaira	2:00	350	Boxscore
Sep 21, 2025	14:30	Nicaragua	1–11	Mexico	F/5	Estadio Fórum La Guaira	2:00	100	Boxscore
Sep 21, 2025	18:00	Argentina	0–17	Venezuela	F/5	Estadio Fórum La Guaira	2:10	150	Boxscore
Sep 22, 2025	14:30	Argentina	2–7	Cuba		Estadio Fórum La Guaira	2:50	150	Boxscore
Sep 22, 2025	18:20	Venezuela	4–0	Nicaragua		Estadio Fórum La Guaira	2:10	250	Boxscore
Sep 23, 2025	14:30	Cuba	3–1	Nicaragua		Estadio Fórum La Guaira	1:55	100	Boxscore
Sep 23, 2025	18:00	Mexico	4–8	Venezuela		Estadio Fórum La Guaira	2:55	250	Boxscore
Sep 24, 2025	14:30	Nicaragua	12–2	Argentina	F/5	Estadio Fórum La Guaira	2:30	100	Boxscore
Sep 24, 2025	18:00	Cuba	6–2	Mexico		Estadio Fórum La Guaira	2:10	100	Boxscore

== Finals ==
=== Semifinal ===
Date	Local time	Road team	Score	Home team	Inn.	Venue	Game duration	Attendance	Boxscore
Sep 25, 2025	14:30	Mexico	6–2	Cuba		Estadio Fórum La Guaira	2:05	100	Boxscore
Sep 25, 2025	18:00	Nicaragua	1–10	Venezuela		Estadio Fórum La Guaira	2:15	300	Boxscore

=== Bronze medal game ===
Date	Local time	Road team	Score	Home team	Inn.	Venue	Game duration	Attendance	Boxscore
Sep 26, 2025	13:00	Nicaragua	8–9	Cuba	F/8	Estadio Fórum La Guaira	3:00	100	Boxscore

=== Final ===
Date	Local time	Road team	Score	Home team	Inn.	Venue	Game duration	Attendance	Boxscore
Sep 26, 2025	17:00	Mexico	8–9	Venezuela		Estadio Fórum La Guaira	3:00	500	Boxscore

== Final standings ==
Qualification
2027 Women's Baseball World Cup Group Stages

Rank	Team
Gold medal	Venezuela
Silver medal	Mexico
Bronze medal	Cuba
4th	Nicaragua
5th	Argentina

== External websites ==
- Official website
