= Ashton Lansdell =

American baseball player (born 2001)

Los Angeles Queens – No. 1
- Third baseman
- Born: February 22, 2001 (age 25); Charlotte, North Carolina
- Bats: Right Throws: Right

WPBL debut
- Aug 1, 2026, for the Los Angeles Queens
- Stats at Baseball Reference

Teams
- Los Angeles Queens (2026–present)

Career highlights and awards
- WPBL Champion (2026)
Medals
Women's baseball
Representing United States
Women's Baseball World Cup
Silver medal – second place	2024 Canada	Team

Ashton Grace Lansdell (born February 22, 2001) is an American professional baseball player. She plays for the Los Angeles Queens of the Women's Pro Baseball League (WPBL), where she is the team captain, and for the Party Animals of the Banana Ball Championship League. She has played for the United States women's national baseball team since 2018.

== Early life and education ==
Lansdell was born in Charlotte, North Carolina to Scott and Dana Lansdell, and raised in Marietta, Georgia. She attended Wheeler High School in Marietta, where she was a pitcher on the varsity baseball team.

Lansdell spent her freshman year at Georgia Highlands College, where she became the first female to play baseball at the NJCAA level. She then transferred to Florida International University, where she played two seasons of softball. For her senior year, she transferred to the University of Mississippi, where she played third base for the Rebels softball team. Lansdell was a member of the team in 2025 when they made their Women's College World Series debut.

== Professional career ==
=== US women's national team ===
In 2018, Lansdell joined the United States women's national baseball team. She was a starter in all 5 games at the 2024 Women's Baseball World Cup and won the silver medal with the rest of the national team.

=== Banana Ball ===
In 2024, Lansdell signed a short-term contract with the Savannah Bananas. In 2025, Lansdell signed with the Party Animals full-time, becoming the team's first female player.

=== Women's Pro Baseball League ===
In the inaugural Women's Pro Baseball League draft, Lansdell was selected 7th overall by WPBL Los Angeles. Since March 13, 2026, Lansdell has hosted The WPBL Podcast. On July 31, 2026, it was announced that she would serve as the team's captain.

During the 2026 WPBL regular season, Lansdell led the Queens in batting average (.477) and OPS (1.441). The Queens would go on to win the first WPBL championship title.

== Personal life ==
Lansdell identifies as queer. She is in a relationship with fellow Ole Miss Rebels softball teammate Aliyah Binford.
