= José Antonio Casanova Stadium =

Venezuelan sports stadium

The José Antonio Casanova Stadium is a multipurpose sports facility in Venezuela. The stadium is located within the military base of Fort Tiuna, itself located between Coche and El Valle parishes, both south of the Libertador Municipality, southwest of Caracas.

José Antonio Casanova Stadium is mainly used for baseball or softball. While it has hosted various events such as the Interinstitutional Military Games, its use is not limited to the Venezuelan Armed Forces. The stadium is regularly used for civilian sports activities, including international events – such as the 2010 Women's Baseball World Cup, for which it received a major renovation, or the 2013 Youth Baseball World Cup.

The stadium is named for José Antonio Casanova, a Venezuelan Baseball Hall of Fame and Museum player and manager, who won multiple Venezuelan Professional Baseball League (LVBP) and international championships during his combined career that lasted over more than three decades. In addition to his time with the LVBP, he also managed the team of Venezuela's Military Academy of the Bolivarian Army, located at Fort Tiuna, for 29 years.

== 2010 Women's Baseball World Cup shooting incident ==
On August 13, 2010, during the 2010 Women's Baseball World Cup game at José Antonio Casanova Stadium between the Netherlands and Hong Kong, Hong Kong player Cheuk Woon-Yee was struck in the leg by a stray bullet from the military base. All remaining Casanova Stadium games for the tournament, including the final, were moved to Maracay, while Hong Kong withdrew from the competition to return home.
