= Simone Wearne =

Australian baseball player

Simone Wearne (born 5 December 1980 in Melbourne) is a former pitcher for the Australia women's national baseball team. At the 2006 Women's Baseball World Cup she was named in the All-World team as a starting pitcher. She was a member of the Australian team which won the 2002 Women's World Baseball Series, and was named co-MVP of the tournament along with First Baseman Sue Fairhurst. She is the sister of professional baseball infielder Scott Wearne. She is a player and coach for Melbourne-based baseball club the Springvale Lions (women's program). She was coach of the Women's National Team from 2013 - 2018, and has coached Victoria Blue and South Australia at the Women's National Championships.

Simone coached the 18U Australian Women's Baseball Team to a silver medal at the Phoenix Cup Women's Baseball Tournament in Hong Kong in 2013, before leading the Emeralds to a bronze medal finish at the 2014 Women's Baseball World Cup in Japan.

In 2012 Simone became the first female and youngest person ever inducted into the Baseball Australia Hall of Fame.
