= Zoe Hicks =

Canadian softball player

Personal information
- Born: January 28, 1998 (age 28) Boissevain, Manitoba, Canada
- Height: 173 cm (5 ft 8 in)

Sport
- Sport: Softball; Baseball
- College team: Louisiana Tech; Iowa Western
Medal record
Women's softball
Representing Canada
Women's World Cup
Bronze medal – third place	2024 Castions di Strada	Team
Pan American Games
Bronze medal – third place	2023 Santiago	Team

Zoe Hicks (born January 28, 1998) is a Canadian softball and baseball player and coach. She helped Canada to win a bronze medal in softball at the 2023 Pan American Games. Hicks played softball collegiately with Iowa Western Community College before ending her college career with Louisiana Tech.

She was a coach for the Los Angeles Dodgers in 2022 and 2023.

== Playing career ==
Hicks started playing softball at the age of 6 when she started out playing as pitcher, though she walked the bases loaded in this first experience. When the family moved to Austria when she was in grade 8, she continued to practice softball by throwing pitches in the hockey rinks where her father coached.

Her attention to the sport of softball eventually allowed for her to attend Iowa Western Community College and play on the school's softball team. She excelled there and named to three different All-American teams following that sophomore season, including first team National Junior College Athletic Association as well as second team FastPitch News and third team National Fastpitch Coaches Association. She gained Division 1 college attention and initially transferred to Buffalo to play for the university team there as a coach of Iowa Western travelled there to coach the team, he was replaced that same year and Hicks looked for other opportunities. She eventually transferred to Louisiana Tech Bulldogs and Lady Techsters where despite early struggles, her enthusiasm for her sport and teammates allowed her to find success.

Hicks started playing baseball when she was 20. In 2020, she became the first female player signed to the collegiate summer Expedition League by the Wheat City Whiskey Jacks, who eventually played the 2020 season in Grand Forks, North Dakota due to the COVID-19 pandemic.

== International career ==
She has played in international tournaments for both the provincial Manitoba team and the Canadian national teams. Hicks has also played on the Canadian women's baseball team including playing at the 2024 Women's Baseball World Cup.

Hicks was named the national baseball team's MVP in 2022.

Hicks hit a two-run single in the bronze medal game at the 2023 Pan American Games as the Canadians defeated Mexico 7-0 in five innings. Following the medal, Hicks said that of the team's win and hopes for future success that "I think it was big for us (to win a medal). We had really high expectations and the tournament didn't go as we had planned. We wanted to play the gold-medal game we wanted to compete for gold. For us, we love coming away with bronze but we have bigger expectations coming for the worlds next year and then following with the Olympics five years from now.”

Hicks represented Canada at the 2024 Women's Softball World Cup, winning a bronze medal.

== Coaching career ==
Hicks worked for the Los Angeles Dodgers coaching staff in their technology division in 2022. She got the position by first going through a program with the MLB called "Take the Field" that was aimed in getting more women involved in baseball. She completed the virtual seminars in 2020 and was placed into a database for clubs to choose from before eventually being selected by the Dodgers.

In 2023, she became a coach/baseball tech associate with the Arizona Complex League Dodgers, doing some on-field coaching. However, she stepped down from her role with the Dodgers due to her commitments to the Canadian baseball and softball teams.

== Personal life ==
Born in Boissevain, Manitoba, Hicks grew up enjoying dance and practiced ballet as a child. Her older brother played hockey as her father coached the sport, she herself tried the sport of hockey but her father realized at a young age there was not any interest for it. When she was in grade 8, the family moved to Austria where her father had a coaching opportunity and she continued in dance with professional ballet instruction.
