= 2012 Women's Baseball World Cup =

Tournament details
- Country: Canada
- Dates: 10 August - 19 August
- Teams: 8
- Defending champions: Japan

Final positions
- Champions: Japan (3rd title)
- Runners-up: United States
- Third place: Canada
- Fourth place: Australia

Tournament statistics
- Games played: 36
- Attendance: 33,720 (937 per game)

Awards
- MVP: (Japan) Yukari Isozaki

The 2012 Women's Baseball World Cup was an international baseball competition being held in Edmonton, Alberta, Canada from August 10 to 19, 2012. Japan won their third consecutive title. Their loss to the United States in the opening round was the team's last loss in the World Cup until 2024.

== Teams ==
Eight teams participated in the tournament. All eight had competed in the 2010 World Cup, which had 11 teams.

| Australia | 2010 World Cup |
| Canada | 5th, 2010 World Cup |
| Chinese Taipei | 7th, 2010 World Cup |
| Cuba | 6th, 2010 World Cup |
| Japan | 2010 World Cup |
| Netherlands | 10th, 2010 World Cup |
| United States | 2010 World Cup |
| Venezuela | 4th, 2010 World Cup |

== Round 1 ==
=== Standings ===
| Teams | W | L | Pct. | GB | R | RA |
|---|---|---|---|---|---|---|
| Japan | 6 | 1 | .857 | – | 66 | 13 |
| Canada | 6 | 1 | .857 | – | 84 | 30 |
| United States | 5 | 2 | .714 | 1 | 58 | 34 |
| Australia | 4 | 3 | .571 | 2 | 68 | 42 |
| Chinese Taipei | 3 | 4 | .429 | 3 | 33 | 55 |
| Venezuela | 3 | 4 | .429 | 3 | 35 | 53 |
| Cuba | 1 | 6 | .143 | 5 | 28 | 65 |
| Netherlands | 0 | 7 | .000 | 6 | 27 | 107 |

=== Schedule ===
| August 10, 2012 | United States | 10 – 0 (F/5) | Netherlands | Telus Field, Edmonton; Attendance: 120 |
| August 10, 2012 | | Boxscore | | Telus Field, Edmonton; Attendance: 120 |

| August 10, 2012 | Cuba | 4 – 12 | Australia | John Fry Park, Edmonton; Attendance: 400 |
| August 10, 2012 | | Boxscore | | John Fry Park, Edmonton; Attendance: 400 |

| August 10, 2012 | Canada | 12 – 2 (F/5) | Chinese Taipei | Telus Field, Edmonton; Attendance: 1,500 |
| August 10, 2012 | | Boxscore | | Telus Field, Edmonton; Attendance: 1,500 |

| August 11, 2012 | Chinese Taipei | 6 – 3 | Cuba | Telus Field, Edmonton; Attendance: 200 |
| August 11, 2012 | | Boxscore | | Telus Field, Edmonton; Attendance: 200 |

| August 11, 2012 | Netherlands | 0 – 21 (F/5) | Japan | John Fry Park, Edmonton; Attendance: 300 |
| August 11, 2012 | | Boxscore | | John Fry Park, Edmonton; Attendance: 300 |

| August 11, 2012 | Australia | 8 – 11 | United States | Telus Field, Edmonton; Attendance: 400 |
| August 11, 2012 | | Boxscore | | Telus Field, Edmonton; Attendance: 400 |

| August 11, 2012 | Venezuela | 2 – 14 (F/5) | Canada | Telus Field, Edmonton; Attendance: 2,500 |
| August 11, 2012 | | Boxscore | | Telus Field, Edmonton; Attendance: 2,500 |

| August 12, 2012 | Chinese Taipei | 17 – 3 (F/5) | Netherlands | Telus Field, Edmonton; Attendance: 100 |
| August 12, 2012 | | Boxscore | | Telus Field, Edmonton; Attendance: 100 |

| August 12, 2012 | Cuba | 5 – 11 | Venezuela | John Fry Park, Edmonton; Attendance: 150 |
| August 12, 2012 | | Boxscore | | John Fry Park, Edmonton; Attendance: 150 |

| August 12, 2012 | Canada | 5 – 4 | Australia | Telus Field, Edmonton; Attendance: 2,000 |
| August 12, 2012 | | Boxscore | | Telus Field, Edmonton; Attendance: 2,000 |

| August 12, 2012 | United States | 5 – 2 | Japan | Telus Field, Edmonton; Attendance: 1,900 |
| August 12, 2012 | | Boxscore | | Telus Field, Edmonton; Attendance: 1,900 |

| August 13, 2012 | Japan | 10 – 0 (F/5) | Cuba | Telus Field, Edmonton; Attendance: 150 |
| August 13, 2012 | | Boxscore | | Telus Field, Edmonton; Attendance: 150 |

| August 13, 2012 | Chinese Taipei | 4 – 2 | Venezuela | John Fry Park, Edmonton; Attendance: 150 |
| August 13, 2012 | | Boxscore | | John Fry Park, Edmonton; Attendance: 150 |

| August 13, 2012 | Australia | 13 – 11 | Netherlands | Telus Field, Edmonton; Attendance: 200 |
| August 13, 2012 | | Boxscore | | Telus Field, Edmonton; Attendance: 200 |

| August 13, 2012 | United States | 9 – 15 (F/8) | Canada | Telus Field, Edmonton; Attendance: 3,000 |
| August 13, 2012 | | Boxscore | | Telus Field, Edmonton; Attendance: 3,000 |

| August 14, 2012 | Japan | 11 – 1 (F/5) | Chinese Taipei | Telus Field, Edmonton; Attendance: 250 |
| August 14, 2012 | | Boxscore | | Telus Field, Edmonton; Attendance: 250 |

| August 14, 2012 | Netherlands | 2 – 19 (F/5) | Canada | Telus Field, Edmonton; Attendance: 150 |
| August 14, 2012 | | Boxscore | | Telus Field, Edmonton; Attendance: 150 |

| August 15, 2012 | Venezuela | 0 – 3 | Japan | Telus Field, Edmonton; Attendance: 250 |
| August 15, 2012 | | Boxscore | | Telus Field, Edmonton; Attendance: 250 |

| August 15, 2012 | Australia | 20 – 1 (F/5) | Venezuela | Telus Field, Edmonton; Attendance: 350 |
| August 15, 2012 | | Boxscore | | Telus Field, Edmonton; Attendance: 350 |

| August 15, 2012 | Cuba | 1 – 9 | United States | John Fry Park, Edmonton; Attendance: 200 |
| August 15, 2012 | | Boxscore | | John Fry Park, Edmonton; Attendance: 200 |

| August 16, 2012 | Venezuela | 14 – 6 | Netherlands | Telus Field, Edmonton; Attendance: 250 |
| August 16, 2012 | | Boxscore | | Telus Field, Edmonton; Attendance: 250 |

| August 16, 2012 | United States | 13 – 3 (F/5) | Chinese Taipei | John Fry Park, Edmonton; Attendance: 300 |
| August 16, 2012 | | Boxscore | | John Fry Park, Edmonton; Attendance: 300 |

| August 16, 2012 | Japan | 10 – 0 (F/6) | Australia | Telus Field, Edmonton; Attendance: 350 |
| August 16, 2012 | | Boxscore | | Telus Field, Edmonton; Attendance: 350 |

| August 16, 2012 | Canada | 12 – 2 (F/6) | Cuba | Telus Field, Edmonton; Attendance: 2,800 |
| August 16, 2012 | | Boxscore | | Telus Field, Edmonton; Attendance: 2,800 |

| August 17, 2012 | Australia | 11 – 0 (F/5) | Chinese Taipei | Telus Field, Edmonton; Attendance: 300 |
| August 17, 2012 | | Boxscore | | Telus Field, Edmonton; Attendance: 300 |

| August 17, 2012 | Venezuela | 5 – 1 | United States | John Fry Park, Edmonton; Attendance: 250 |
| August 17, 2012 | | Boxscore | | John Fry Park, Edmonton; Attendance: 250 |

| August 17, 2012 | Netherlands | 5 – 13 | Cuba | Telus Field, Edmonton; Attendance: 200 |
| August 17, 2012 | | Boxscore | | Telus Field, Edmonton; Attendance: 200 |

| August 17, 2012 | Japan | 9 – 7 | Canada | Telus Field, Edmonton; Attendance: 5,100 |
| August 17, 2012 | | Boxscore | | Telus Field, Edmonton; Attendance: 5,100 |

== Round 2 ==
=== Semifinals ===
| August 18, 2012 | Chinese Taipei | 7 – 5 | Netherlands | Telus Field, Edmonton; Attendance: 250 |
| August 18, 2012 | | Boxscore | | Telus Field, Edmonton; Attendance: 250 |

| August 18, 2012 | Venezuela | 9 – 6 | Cuba | John Fry Park, Edmonton; Attendance: 250 |
| August 18, 2012 | | Boxscore | | John Fry Park, Edmonton; Attendance: 250 |

| August 18, 2012 | Japan | 5 – 1 | Australia | Telus Field, Edmonton; Attendance: 500 |
| August 18, 2012 | | Boxscore | | Telus Field, Edmonton; Attendance: 500 |

| August 18, 2012 | Canada | 4 – 17 (F/6) | United States | Telus Field, Edmonton; Attendance: 3,100 |
| August 18, 2012 | | Boxscore | | Telus Field, Edmonton; Attendance: 3,100 |

=== 7th place game ===
| August 19, 2012 | Cuba | 8 – 10 | Netherlands | Telus Field, Edmonton; Attendance: 250 |
| August 19, 2012 | | Boxscore | | Telus Field, Edmonton; Attendance: 250 |

=== 5th place game ===
| August 19, 2012 | Chinese Taipei | 1 – 6 | Venezuela | John Fry Park, Edmonton; Attendance: 250 |
| August 19, 2012 | | Boxscore | | John Fry Park, Edmonton; Attendance: 250 |

=== Bronze medal game ===
| August 19, 2012 | Canada | 17 – 13 | Australia | Telus Field, Edmonton; Attendance: 2,000 |
| August 19, 2012 | | Boxscore | | Telus Field, Edmonton; Attendance: 2,000 |

=== Final ===
| August 19, 2012 | Japan | 3 – 0 | United States | Telus Field, Edmonton; Attendance: 3,300 |
| August 19, 2012 | | Boxscore | | Telus Field, Edmonton; Attendance: 3,300 |

== Final standings ==
| Rk | Team | W | L |
|---|---|---|---|
| 1st place, gold medalist(s) | Japan | 8 | 1 |
Lost in the final
| 2nd place, silver medalist(s) | United States | 6 | 3 |
Failed to qualify for final
| 3rd place, bronze medalist(s) | Canada | 7 | 2 |
| 4 | Australia | 4 | 5 |
Failed to qualify for medal games
| 5 | Venezuela | 5 | 4 |
| 6 | Chinese Taipei | 4 | 5 |
| 7 | Netherlands | 1 | 8 |
| 8 | Cuba | 1 | 8 |

2012 Women's Baseball World champions

Japan
3rd title

== Awards and leaders ==
=== Individual awards ===
- Most valuable player: (Japan) Yukari Isozaki
- Outstanding defensive player: (Japan) Ayako Rokkaku

=== All-Star team ===
| Position | Name | Team |
|---|---|---|
| Starting pitcher | Yukari Isozaki | Japan |
| Relief pitcher | Ayami Sato | Japan |
| Catcher | Stephanie Savoie | Canada |
| First base | Kate Psota | Canada |
| Second base | Nicole Luchanski | Canada |
| Third base | Christina Kreppold | Australia |
| Shortstop | Ayaka Deguchi | Japan |
| Outfield | Iori Miura | Japan |
| Outfield | Jenna Flannigan | Canada |
| Outfield | Hsiao Mei Chen | Chinese Taipei |
| Designated hitter | Tamara Holmes | United States |

=== Statistical leaders ===
- Best batting average: (United States) Tamara Holmes, .679
- Pitcher best earned run average: (Australia) Lauren McGrath
- Pitcher best win–loss record: (Japan) Yukaria Isozaki
- Most runs batted in: (Australia) Katie Gaynor, 13
- Most home runs: (Canada) Nicole Luchanski, 1
- Most stolen bases: (Australia) Bronwyn Gell, 9
- Most runs scored: (Australia) Shae Lillywhite, 16
