= 2010 Women's Baseball World Cup =

Tournament details
- Country: Venezuela
- Dates: 12 August - 22 August
- Teams: 11
- Defending champions: Japan

Final positions
- Champions: Japan (2nd title)
- Runners-up: Australia
- Third place: United States
- Fourth place: Venezuela

Tournament statistics
- Games played: 40
- Attendance: 156,684 (3,917 per game)
- Best BA: (Japan) Ayako Rokkaku (.643)
- Most HRs: (United States) Tamara Holmes (3)
- Most SBs: (Cuba) Dayana Batista (7–7)
- Best ERA: (Japan) Kasumi Noguchi (0.00)
- Most Ks (as pitcher): (United States) Martina Sementelli (14)

Awards
- MVP: Ayako Rokkaku
- All statistics correct as of August 22, 2010.

The 2010 Women's Baseball World Cup was an international baseball competition that was held in Venezuela from August 12 to August 22, 2010. Japan successfully defended their title from 2008, defeating Australia 13–3 in the final.

== Teams ==
The following 11 teams appeared at the tournament.

Pool A
Australia	4th, 2008 World Cup
Canada	2008 World Cup
Chinese Taipei	5th, 2008 World Cup
Hong Kong	8th, 2008 World Cup
Netherlands	1st appearance
Venezuela	1st appearance

Pool B
Cuba	6th, 2006 World Cup
Japan	2008 World Cup
Puerto Rico	1st appearance
South Korea	6th, 2008 World Cup
United States	2008 World Cup

== Round 1 ==
=== Pool A ===
==== Standings ====
Teams	W	L	Pct.	GB	R	RA
Venezuela	4	0	1.000	–	36	10
Canada	3	1	.750	1	27	11
Australia	2	2	.500	2	22	17
Chinese Taipei (Note: Chinese Taipei's result against Hong Kong was removed from their record after Hong Kong withdrew from the tournament.)	1	3	.250	3	20	16
Netherlands	0	4	.000	4	8	59
Hong Kong (Note: Hong Kong withdrew from the tournament, after a shooting incident during their second game against the Netherlands.)	0	1	.000	N/A	1	17

==== Schedule ====
August 12, 2010	Chinese Taipei	17 – 1 (F/5)	Hong Kong	Estadio Cesar Nieves, Vargas; Attendance: 1,500
August 12, 2010		Boxscore		Estadio Cesar Nieves, Vargas; Attendance: 1,500

August 12, 2010	Australia	1 – 6	Canada	Estadio Cesar Nieves, Vargas; Attendance: 1,200
August 12, 2010		Boxscore		Estadio Cesar Nieves, Vargas; Attendance: 1,200

August 12, 2010	Netherlands	4 – 20 (F/5)	Venezuela	Estadio José A. Casanova, Caracas; Attendance: 5,000
August 12, 2010		Boxscore		Estadio José A. Casanova, Caracas; Attendance: 5,000

August 13, 2010	Canada	7 – 6	Chinese Taipei	Estadio José A. Casanova, Caracas; Attendance: 250
August 13, 2010		Boxscore		Estadio José A. Casanova, Caracas; Attendance: 250

August 13, 2010	Hong Kong	9 – 12 (F/3)	Netherlands	Estadio José A. Casanova, Caracas
August 13, 2010		Boxscore		Estadio José A. Casanova, Caracas

August 15, 2010	Australia	16 – 3 (F/5)	Netherlands	Estadio José Perez Colmenares, Maracay; Attendance: 4,000
August 15, 2010		Boxscore		Estadio José Perez Colmenares, Maracay; Attendance: 4,000

August 15, 2010	Chinese Taipei	3 – 5	Venezuela	Estadio José Perez Colmenares, Maracay; Attendance: 8,451
August 15, 2010		Boxscore		Estadio José Perez Colmenares, Maracay; Attendance: 8,451

August 16, 2010	Canada	12 – 1 (F/5)	Netherlands	Estadio Aviación, Maracay; Attendance: 500
August 16, 2010		Boxscore		Estadio Aviación, Maracay; Attendance: 500

August 16, 2010	Australia	4 – 0	Chinese Taipei	Estadio Aviación, Maracay; Attendance: 600
August 16, 2010		Boxscore		Estadio Aviación, Maracay; Attendance: 600

August 16, 2010	Netherlands	0 – 11	Chinese Taipei	Estadio Aviación, Maracay; Attendance: 800
August 16, 2010		Boxscore		Estadio Aviación, Maracay; Attendance: 800

August 16, 2010	Venezuela	3 – 2 (F/8)	Canada	Estadio José Perez Colmenares, Maracay; Attendance: 4,932
August 16, 2010		Boxscore		Estadio José Perez Colmenares, Maracay; Attendance: 4,932

August 17, 2010	Venezuela	8 – 1	Australia	Estadio José Perez Colmenares, Maracay; Attendance: 12,639
August 17, 2010		Boxscore		Estadio José Perez Colmenares, Maracay; Attendance: 12,639

=== Pool B ===
==== Standings ====
Teams	W	L	Pct.	GB	R	RA
Japan	4	0	1.000	–	32	2
United States	3	1	.750	1	36	5
Cuba	2	2	.500	2	34	18
Puerto Rico	1	3	.250	3	11	31
South Korea	0	4	.000	4	9	66

==== Schedule ====
August 12, 2010	United States	1 – 5	Japan	Estadio José Perez Colmenares, Maracay; Attendance: 6,000
August 12, 2010		Boxscore		Estadio José Perez Colmenares, Maracay; Attendance: 6,000

August 12, 2010	South Korea	9 – 21 (F/6)	Cuba	Estadio Aviacion, Maracay; Attendance: 1,000
August 12, 2010		Boxscore		Estadio Aviacion, Maracay; Attendance: 1,000

August 13, 2010	Cuba	1 – 3	Japan	Estadio José Perez Colmenares, Maracay; Attendance: 2,000
August 13, 2010		Boxscore		Estadio José Perez Colmenares, Maracay; Attendance: 2,000

August 15, 2010	Puerto Rico	1 – 12 (F/6)	Cuba	Estadio José Perez Colmenares, Maracay; Attendance: 4,500
August 15, 2010		Boxscore		Estadio José Perez Colmenares, Maracay; Attendance: 4,500

August 15, 2010	South Korea	0 – 21 (F/5)	United States	Estadio Aviación, Maracay; Attendance: 200
August 15, 2010		Boxscore		Estadio Aviación, Maracay; Attendance: 200

August 15, 2010	Japan	14 – 0 (F/5)	South Korea	Estadio Aviacion, Maracay; Attendance: 1,000
August 15, 2010		Boxscore		Estadio Aviacion, Maracay; Attendance: 1,000

August 15, 2010	Cuba	0 – 5	United States	Estadio Aviación, Maracay; Attendance: 1,500
August 15, 2010		Boxscore		Estadio Aviación, Maracay; Attendance: 1,500

August 16, 2010	Puerto Rico	10 – 0 (F/5)	South Korea	Estadio José Perez Colmenares, Maracay; Attendance: 200
August 16, 2010		Boxscore		Estadio José Perez Colmenares, Maracay; Attendance: 200

August 16, 2010	United States	9 – 0	Puerto Rico	Estadio José Perez Colmenares, Maracay; Attendance: 1,300
August 16, 2010		Boxscore		Estadio José Perez Colmenares, Maracay; Attendance: 1,300

August 17, 2010	Japan	10 – 0 (F/6)	Puerto Rico	Estadio José Perez Colmenares, Maracay; Attendance: 1,500
August 17, 2010		Boxscore		Estadio José Perez Colmenares, Maracay; Attendance: 1,500

== Round 2 ==
=== Pool C ===
==== Standings ====
Teams	W	L	Pct.	GB	R	RA	Tiebreaker
Japan	4	1	.800	–	33	14	1–0
Venezuela	4	1	.800	–	22	22	0–1
Australia	3	2	.600	1	37	31	
United States	2	3	.400	2	28	32	1–0
Canada	2	3	.400	2	21	29	0–1
Cuba	0	5	.000	4	15	28	

==== Schedule ====
August 18, 2010	Canada	1 – 10	United States	Estadio José Perez Colmenares, Maracay; Attendance: 639
August 18, 2010		Boxscore		Estadio José Perez Colmenares, Maracay; Attendance: 639

August 18, 2010	Japan	9 – 10	Australia	Estadio José Perez Colmenares, Maracay; Attendance: 7,000
August 18, 2010		Boxscore		Estadio José Perez Colmenares, Maracay; Attendance: 7,000

August 18, 2010	Venezuela	4 – 3	Cuba	Estadio José Perez Colmenares, Maracay; Attendance: 13,582
August 18, 2010		Boxscore		Estadio José Perez Colmenares, Maracay; Attendance: 13,582

August 19, 2010	Australia	6 – 2	Cuba	Estadio José Perez Colmenares, Maracay; Attendance: 1,225
August 19, 2010		Boxscore		Estadio José Perez Colmenares, Maracay; Attendance: 1,225

August 19, 2010	Japan	6 – 2	Canada	Estadio José Perez Colmenares, Maracay; Attendance: 6,560
August 19, 2010		Boxscore		Estadio José Perez Colmenares, Maracay; Attendance: 6,560

August 19, 2010	Venezuela	7 – 6	United States	Estadio José Perez Colmenares, Maracay; Attendance: 14,501
August 19, 2010		Boxscore		Estadio José Perez Colmenares, Maracay; Attendance: 14,501

August 20, 2010	Canada	10 – 9	Cuba	Estadio José Perez Colmenares, Maracay; Attendance: 355
August 20, 2010		Boxscore		Estadio José Perez Colmenares, Maracay; Attendance: 355

August 20, 2010	United States	6 – 19 (F/6)	Australia	Estadio José Perez Colmenares, Maracay; Attendance: 7,322
August 20, 2010		Boxscore		Estadio José Perez Colmenares, Maracay; Attendance: 7,322

August 20, 2010	Japan	10 – 0 (F/5)	Venezuela	Estadio José Perez Colmenares, Maracay; Attendance: 12,578
August 20, 2010		Boxscore		Estadio José Perez Colmenares, Maracay; Attendance: 12,578

=== Pool D ===
==== Standings ====
Teams	W	L	Pct.	GB	R	RA
Chinese Taipei	3	0	1.000	–	39	3
Puerto Rico	2	1	.667	1	22	17
South Korea	1	2	.333	2	17	27
Netherlands	0	3	.000	3	6	37

==== Schedule ====
August 19, 2010	Chinese Taipei	12 – 2 (F/6)	South Korea	Estadio Aviación, Maracay; Attendance: 70
August 19, 2010		Boxscore		Estadio Aviación, Maracay; Attendance: 70

August 19, 2010	Puerto Rico	11 – 1 (F/5)	Netherlands	Estadio Aviación, Maracay; Attendance: 103
August 19, 2010		Boxscore		Estadio Aviación, Maracay; Attendance: 103

August 20, 2010	Puerto Rico	1 – 16 (F/5)	Chinese Taipei	Estadio Aviación, Maracay; Attendance: 600
August 20, 2010		Boxscore		Estadio Aviación, Maracay; Attendance: 600

August 20, 2010	South Korea	15 – 5	Netherlands	Estadio Aviacion, Maracay; Attendance: 600
August 20, 2010		Boxscore		Estadio Aviacion, Maracay; Attendance: 600

== Final round ==
=== Classification games ===
==== 9th and 10th place ====
August 21, 2010	South Korea	11 – 4	Netherlands	Estadio Aviación, Maracay; Attendance: 57
August 21, 2010		Boxscore		Estadio Aviación, Maracay; Attendance: 57

==== 7th and 8th place ====
August 21, 2010	Chinese Taipei	4 – 3	Puerto Rico	Estadio Aviacion, Maracay; Attendance: 120
August 21, 2010		Boxscore		Estadio Aviacion, Maracay; Attendance: 120

==== 5th and 6th place ====
August 21, 2010	Canada	5 – 1	Cuba	Estadio José Perez Colmenares, Maracay; Attendance: 300
August 21, 2010		Boxscore		Estadio José Perez Colmenares, Maracay; Attendance: 300

=== Semi-finals ===
Semi-finals
1	Japan	6
4	United States	1
3	Venezuela	2
2	Australia	12

Gold medal game
W1	Japan	13
W2	Australia	3
Bronze medal game
L1	United States	15
L2	Venezuela	5

August 21, 2010	Japan	6 – 1	United States	Estadio José Perez Colmenares, Maracay; Attendance: 5,000
August 21, 2010		Boxscore		Estadio José Perez Colmenares, Maracay; Attendance: 5,000

August 21, 2010	Venezuela	2 – 12	Australia	Estadio José Perez Colmenares, Maracay; Attendance: 10,500
August 21, 2010		Boxscore		Estadio José Perez Colmenares, Maracay; Attendance: 10,500

=== Bronze medal game ===
August 22, 2010	United States	15 – 5 (F/6)	Venezuela	Estadio José Perez Colmenares, Maracay; Attendance: 6,000
August 22, 2010		Boxscore		Estadio José Perez Colmenares, Maracay; Attendance: 6,000

=== Gold medal game ===
August 22, 2010	Japan	13 – 3 (F/5)	Australia	Estadio José Perez Colmenares, Maracay; Attendance: 6,350
August 22, 2010		Boxscore		Estadio José Perez Colmenares, Maracay; Attendance: 6,350

== Shooting incident ==
On August 13, during the game against the Netherlands, Hong Kong player Cheuk Woon-Yee was struck by a stray bullet in the leg. The incident occurred when Cheuk was taking the field to play third base in the fourth inning against the Netherlands, which were leading the game 12–9. The game was held at José Antonio Casanova Stadium in Fort Tiuna, a military garrison in Caracas. The other two games on Friday and all games on Saturday were postponed.

On August 15, the International Baseball Federation and the organizers of the tournament decided to move all remaining games to Maracay. The schedule did not include Hong Kong, as they elected to withdraw from the competition to return home.

== Final standings ==
Rk	Team	W	L
1st place, gold medalist(s)	Japan	8	1
Lost in the final
2nd place, silver medalist(s)	Australia	6	3
Failed to qualify for final
3rd place, bronze medalist(s)	United States	5	4
4	Venezuela	6	3
Failed to qualify for semi finals
5	Canada	6	4
6	Cuba	2	8
Failed to qualify for Pool C
7	Chinese Taipei	5	3
8	Puerto Rico	3	5
9	South Korea	2	6
10	Netherlands	0	8

2010 Women's Baseball World champions

Japan
2nd title

== Awards ==
The IBAF announced the following awards at the completion of the tournament.

All Star Team
Position	Player
Starting Pitcher	(Japan) Ayami Sato
Relief Pitcher	(Australia) Laura Neads
Catcher	(Japan) Tomomi Nishi
First Base	(Canada) Kate Psota
Second Base	(Venezuela) Lelis Gomez
Third Base	(Australia) Christina Kreppold
Short Stop	(United States) Jena Marston
Outfield	(Japan) Akiko Shimura
Outfield	(United States) Tamara Holmes
Outfield	(Venezuela) Leonel Reyes
Designated Hitter	(Australia) Kim McMillan

Tournament Awards
Award	Player
MVP	(Japan) Ayako Rokkaku
Leading Hitter	(Japan) Ayako Rokkaku
Best Earned Run Average	(Japan) Kasumi Noguchi
Best Won/Loss Average	(Japan) Ayami Sato
Most Runs Batted In	(Australia) Katie Gaynor
Most Home Runs	(United States) Tamara Holmes
Most Stolen Bases	(Cuba) Dayana Bautista
Most Runs Scored	(United States) Clarisa Navarro
Outstanding Defensive Player	(United States) Tara Herbert
