= Genevieve Beacom =

Australian baseball player (born 2004)

- Pitcher
- Born: October 30, 2004 (age 21); Melbourne, Australia

Australian Baseball League debut
- 8 January, 2022, for the Melbourne Aces

Teams
- Melbourne Aces (2022)

Career highlights and awards
- First woman to pitch in the Australian Baseball League

Genevieve Beacom (born 30 October 2004) is an Australian baseball pitcher who in 2022 became the first woman to pitch in the Australian Baseball League. Beacom made her debut on 8 January 2022 for the Melbourne Aces in a game against the Adelaide Giants. A left-hander, Beacom throws a curveball, an 85.9 mile-per-hour fastball, and a changeup, and stands at 6 feet 2 inches (1.88 m).

Beacom came to the United States to play college baseball, playing softball for the East Central Falcons in the 2025 season while redshirting for the baseball team. She is signed to play for the Oregon State Beavers softball team starting in the 2026 season.

== Biography ==
=== Early life and amateur career ===
Genevieve Beacom was born on 30 October 2004 to her father Brendan. Growing up, Beacom watched her brother, Sam Trend-Beacom, play baseball, and started herself playing Tee-ball at a young age. Beacom played one year of softball, which she stated she "hated". In 2018, she struck out seventeen batters in a youth women's competition. She was the first woman selected to the Baseball Victoria under-16 team, and was the first female pitcher for the Victorian Summer Baseball League; she pitched to a 0.00 earned run average in the under-16 tournament, which consisted of the best 200 players in Australia. She played in the 2019 Australian Youth Championships.

Beacom signed with the Melbourne Aces of the Australian Baseball League (ABL) around 1 January 2022 as a development player without pay so as to not interfere with her eligibility to play college baseball in the United States. Beacom made her ABL debut against the Adelaide Giants on 8 January 2022 for the Aces, where she pitched one inning, allowing one walk and no hits as the Aces lost 7–1. When she made her debut, she became the first woman to pitch in the ABL. A left-hander, Beacom throws a curveball, an 85.9 mile-per-hour (MPH) fastball (as of May 2023; most women baseball pitchers throw in the upper 70s for MPH) and a changeup, and stands at 6 feet 2 inches (1.88 m). Beacom stated she that intends to take a gap year for 2023.

In January 2023 Baseball Australia invited Beacom to its men's under-18 national team camp. She was a member of the 2023 roster for Australia women's national baseball team. In the 2024 Women's Baseball World Cup, she went four for thirteen batting and pitched 5 1/3 innings with eight strikeouts. Australia went 2–3 and did not advance to the finals.

=== College career ===
On March 22, 2024, Beacom committed to East Central College, a D-II community college, to play for the Falcons college baseball team.

Beacom played in the college's softball team for the 2025 season, starting at first base, while redshirting for the baseball team. She led the team to a 30-17 record, and was a First Team All-League selection in the Missouri Community College Athletic Conference.

On July 9, 2025, Beacom signed with the D-I Oregon State Beavers softball team ahead of the 2026 season.

== Personal life ==
Beacom's brother Sam played college baseball for Lower Columbia College in Longview, Washington. In an interview with MLB Network in January 2022, she stated her favourite baseball team is the Atlanta Braves, and her favourite player is Gerrit Cole. She graduated from Flinders Christian community college in Tyabb, Victoria in 2022. She stated she would like to study psychology at a university in the United States.
