= Puerto Rico women's national baseball team =

National team of Puerto Rico

Information
- Country: Puerto Rico
- Federation: Federación de Béisbol Aficionado de Puerto Rico
- Confederation: COPABE

WBSC ranking
- Current: 9 ▼2 (31 December 2025)

The Puerto Rico women's national baseball team is a national team of Puerto Rico and is controlled by the Federación de Béisbol Aficionado de Puerto Rico. It represents the nation in women's international competition. The team is a member of the COPABE. They are currently ranked ninth in the world.

== History ==
=== Debut and first years ===
In November 2009, the Puerto Rico women's national baseball team made its international debut, participating in the first edition of the Women's Pan American Baseball Cup, which was classificatory to the 2010 Women's Baseball World Cup. In its first game, the team defeated Venezuela with scores of 6:3. Puerto Rico scored five runs in the first inning and one in the seventh, while Venezuela scored 1 in the first, second and fourth innings. The game was won by Johana Ramos. In its second game, the team defeated Cuba 7:5. Cuba scored first with two runs in the first and one in the third, but Puerto Rico got on the scoreboard by scoring twice in the third and added two more runs in the fifth, in the seventh inning Puerto Rico scored three times and Cuba two. The game was won by Krizia Rivera, who by then was fifteen years old, while Elizabeth Santana registered a saved game. For the team, Lisandra batted 3-2 with an RBI, Coralys Ortíz 4-2 and Yariam Rivera with an RBI. In the third date, the team participated in a double-header. In the first game Puerto Rico defeated the Dominican Republic by mercy rule, 10:0. With this victory the team advanced to the finals, classifying to the World Cup. In the second game of the date, they defeated Cuba in a rematch 3:1. After four games, Puerto Rico dominated the statistics in batting average (.347), earned run average (2.24) and defensive percent (.950). In individual fields, first baseman Berríos, who was twenty years old, led in hits (6), RBIs (5), runs (7) and stolen bases (3) and was second in batting average (.500). In their fifth game, Puerto Rico defeated the Dominican Republic by mercy rule in the third inning, 20:0. The game was won by Ariana Vélez. The team concluded their first participation by winning the silver medal, only losing to Venezuela in the finals. In 2010, the team won the V Cuban Sports Olympics, defeating the Occidentales de Cuba seven runs to one in the final. Yinoska Claudio was selected the tournament's Most Valuable Player, also finishing second in batting average (.571). The team compiled a record of 4-1, only losing to Centrales de Cuba.

== Rosters ==
=== 2015 Pan American Games ===
The Puerto Rico women's national baseball team roster for the 2015 Pan American Games (as of July 19, 2015):

- Lisandra Berríos (IF)
- Angela Castro (U)
- Yinoska Claudio (IF)
- Katiria Dávila (P/IF)
- Noelia De Jesús (P)
- Luz Feliciano (P/IF)
- Dayaniris Flores (C)
- Marlene Gómez (OF)
- Kiara Hernández (P)
- Kiara Irizarry (IF)
- Julitza López (OF)
- Fiordelis Martínez (IF/OF)
- Michelle Martínez (OF)
- Adrix Paradizo (P/IF)
- Diamilette Quiles (IF)
- Janilis Rivera (C)
- Enid Santana (P)
- María Zayas (P)

Legend: C = Catcher, IF = Infielder, OF = Outfielder, P = Pitcher, U = Utility fielder
