= Jillian Albayati =

American baseball player (born 2004)

Jill Albayati

San Francisco Firebells
- Pitcher
- Born: May 3, 2004 (age 22); Anaheim, California, U.S.
- Bats: Right Throws: Right

WPBL debut
- 2026, for the San Francisco Firebells
- Stats at Baseball Reference

Teams
- San Francisco Firebells (2026–present)
Medals
Women's baseball
Representing United States
Women's Baseball World Cup
Silver medal – second place	2024 Canada	Team

Jillian Graciela Albayati (born May 3, 2004) is an American professional baseball player. She is currently a pitcher for the San Francisco Firebells of the Women's Pro Baseball League.

== Early life and education ==
Albayati was born in Anaheim, California to Shawn and Silvia Albayati. She attended Anaheim High School, where she pitched for the varsity baseball team. In 2022, she became the first girl to pitch in a California Interscholastic Federation Southern Section title game.

Albayati attended California State University, San Marcos, where she played for both the softball and baseball teams. On April 7, 2024, she became the first woman to play baseball at CSUSM, and the first NCAA division II athlete to play both softball and baseball on the same day. She graduated in 2026.

== Professional career ==
In 2022, Albayati was added to the United States women's national baseball team roster. At the 2024 Women's Baseball World Cup, she won the silver medal with the rest of the national team.

In the inaugural Women's Pro Baseball League draft, Albayati was selected sixteenth overall by WPBL San Francisco.

On October 27, 2026, Albayati signed with the Texas Tailgaters of the Banana Ball Championship League.
