= Samantha Hamilton =

Australian baseball player and coach

Personal information
- Nicknames: Hotty, Hammo, Hammer

Sport
- Country: Australia
- Sport: Baseball
- Events: Women's World Series, Women's Baseball World Cup
- College team: Wellness College Tokyo (Japan)
- Club: Doncaster Dragons BC
- Team: Doncaster, Victoria, Australia
- Turned pro: 2001
- Retired: 2013

Achievements and titles
- World finals: 2001,2002,2003,2004,2006,2008,2010,2012 (current)
- National finals: 1999–2014

Samantha Hamilton (born 8 April 1973) is a former first basewoman and outfielder for the Australia women's national baseball team.

== Early life and education ==
Samantha-Jane Hamilton was born on 8 April 1973.

== Career ==
Hamilton was an inaugural member of the Doncaster Dragons Baseball Club women’s program in 2000.

She is a 10-time national champion with Victoria, claiming titles in 2000, 01, 02, 04, 05, 07, 08, 09, 11, 13. Hamilton was named 'Hitting Champion' at the 2012 Nationals in Canberra and named to the All Star team and Team Victoria MVP in the same year.

Prior to the IBAF sanctioning the World Cups in 2004, Hamilton won gold in the 2002 and 2003 World Series with Australia, plus a bronze in 2001.

In the 2006 Women's Baseball World Cup Hamilton stole the most bases for the tournament (6 from 6 games).

She was a member of the Australian team which claimed silver at the 2010 IBAF Women's World Cup in Venezuela - Australia's first ever Women's World Cup medal and best ever World Cup result.

At the time of her retirement, she was the only female baseball player in Australia to have played at every Australian Championships and in every Australian Women's team since their inceptions.

Hamilton was first appointed head women's program coach of the Doncaster Dragons Baseball Club in Melbourne in 2006. She has been reappointed each year since then, including for the 2024-25 season.

As of July 2024 she is assistant coach for Team Australia Emeralds, and Victorian High Performance Program Manager.
