= Katie Gaynor =

Australian baseball player (born 1977)

Katie Gaynor (born 30 August 1977 in Sydney) is a utility player for the Australia women's national baseball team. In the 2004 Women's Baseball World Cup she was named as the designated hitter in the All-Star team. She is married to John Gaynor and has played softball for New South Wales.

In the 2010 Women's Baseball World Cup she led the tournament in runs batted in.
