= Amy McCann (baseball) =

Australian baseball player

Personal information
- Nicknames: A-Mac, Mudguts, Muddie
- Nationality: Australian
- Born: 19 December 1978 (age 47) North Sydney, New South Wales
- Height: 168 cm (5 ft 6 in)
- Weight: 65 kg (143 lb)
- Website: ABF profile

Sport
- Country: Australia
- Sport: Baseball
- Events: Women's World Series, Women's Baseball World Cup
- College team: Wellness College (Tokyo)
- Club: Doncaster Dragons BC
- Team: Doncaster, Victoria, Australia
- Turned pro: 2002
- Retired: 2014

Achievements and titles
- World finals: 2002, 2004, 2006, 2008, 2010, 2012, 2014
- National finals: 2002–2013

Amy McCann (born 19 December 1978) is an Australian former baseball player who was a centre-fielder for the Australia women's national baseball team for over a decade.

McCann first was selected to the Australian team in 2002, where she won gold at the 2002 World Series in Florida.

From 2004 to 2014, McCann became one of just five players in the world who contested all of the first six IBAF World Cups).

McCann was a member of the Australian team which memorably claimed silver at the 2010 IBAF Women's World Cup in Venezuela - Australia's first ever World Cup medal and best ever World Cup result. She then claimed a second medal when she won bronze in 2014 at her sixth World Cup.

She was twice named to the All World Team as an outfielder during her career - at the 2006 Women's Baseball World Cup and the 2004 Women's World Series.

In 2006, she was named Baseball Australia's Female Player of the Year.

McCann played for 12 years on the Victorian women's baseball team winning seven national titles in 2004,05,07,08,09,11,13. She was named to the Australian All Star Team in her twelfth and final nationals in 2013.

== Career ==
McCann began playing baseball at age 12, after being turned down by a number of clubs across Sydney before being accepted by the Kissing Point Angels, because at the time there was no women's baseball league in Sydney. After graduating from university in Canberra in 1999, she moved to Melbourne, and began playing in the Baseball Victoria state women's league. She has been involved with her local club, the Doncaster Dragons, since 2002.

Her career achievements include:

- 2014 IBAF Women's World Cup bronze medal
- 2010 IBAF Women's World Cup silver medal
- 2006 ABF Female Player of the Year
- 2006 World Cup All Star Team
- 2004 World Series All Star team
- Member of 2002 World Series Champion – Team Australia
- 3x Victorian State League Batting Champion
- 2013 Australian All Star team
