= Shae Lillywhite =

Australian baseball player (born 1985)

Shae Lillywhite (born 19 January 1985) is an infielder with the Australia women's national baseball team and is the Australia's most capped women's playing having competed at eight consecutive Women's Baseball World Cups from 2004 to 2018.

In the 2006 Cup she was named in the All-Star team as the second basewoman.

In 2013, she became the first Australian signed to the Japan Women's Baseball League
