= Venezuela women's national baseball team =

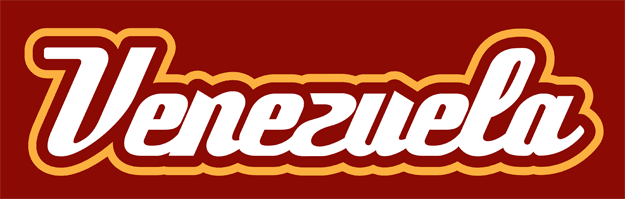

Information
- Country: Venezuela
- Federation: Federación Venezolana de Béisbol
- Confederation: COPABE

WBSC ranking
- Current: 5 ▼1 (31 December 2025)

World Cup
- Best result: Bronze: 3 – (2016)

Pan American Games
- Best result: Bronze: 3 – (2015)

The Venezuela women's national baseball team is a national team of Venezuela and is controlled by the Federación Venezolana de Béisbol. It represents the nation in women's international competition. The team is a member of the COPABE.

== Women's Baseball World Cup ==
- 2010 Women's Baseball World Cup : Fourth Place (4th)
- 2012 Women's Baseball World Cup : Fifth place (5th)
- 2014 Women's Baseball World Cup : Sixth place (6th)
- 2016 Women's Baseball World Cup : Third place (3rd)
- 2018 Women's Baseball World Cup : Fifth place (5th)
- 2024 Women's Baseball World Cup : Fifth place (5th)

== Pan American Games ==
- 2015 Pan American Games : Third place (3rd)

== Rosters ==
=== 2024 Women's Baseball World Cup ===
Venezuela roster – 2024 Women's Baseball World Cup Finals
Official roster		Coaching staff
Pitchers: 37 Abril Amaro; 42 Kimberly Caicedo; 23 Frandelis García; 22 Angélica Ledezma; 72 María Marcano	Catchers: 27 Yakary Molina; 2 Sthephany Suarez; 57 Mariana Valdez; Infielders: 37 Abril Amaro; 42 Kimberly Caicedo; 22 Angélica Ledezma; 15 Migreily Angulo; 14 Srishna Arciniega; 5 Yohelis Colina; 20 Ruclaireth Tovar; Outfielders: 22 Angélica Ledezma; 16 Mariana Natera; 10 Yusneiby Acacio; 15 Migreily Angulo; 14 Srishna Arciniega; Designated hitters: 23 Frandelis García	Coaches: 77 Daniel Méndez

=== 2015 Pan American Games ===
The Venezuela women's national baseball team roster for the 2015 Pan American Games (as of 19 July 2015).

- Migreily Angulo (C)
- Ofelia Arrieche (OF)
- Sor Brito (IF)
- Dayvis Cazorla (P)
- Giddelys Cumana (P)
- Ingrid Escobar (IF)
- Osmari Garcia (C)
- Daily Gimenez (IF)
- Lelis Gomez (IF)
- Oriannys Hernandez (P)
- Kerlys Pérez (P)
- Marianne Pérez (OF)
- Esquia Rengel (U)
- Leonela Reyes (OF)
- Maria Rincon (P)
- Astrid Rodriguez (U)
- Patricia Segovia (U)
- Maigleth Torres (IF)

Legend: C = Catcher, IF = Infielder, OF = Outfielder, P = Pitcher, U = Utility fielder
