= Canada women's national baseball team =

National team

Information
- Country: Canada
- Federation: Baseball Canada
- Confederation: WBSC Americas
- Manager: Anthony Pluta
- Team Colors: Red, White, Black

WBSC ranking
- Current: 3 (31 December 2025)

World Cup
- Appearances: 18 (first in 1969)
- Best result: Silver (2: 2008, 2016)

Pan American Games
- Appearances: 1 (first in 2015)
- Best result: Silver (2015)

The Canada women's national baseball team represents Canada in international women's baseball competitions. They are overseen by Baseball Canada, the governing body of baseball in Canada.

== Team ==
=== Current roster ===
Roster selected for the 2024 Women's Baseball World Cup Finals

Canada roster – 2024 Women's Baseball World Cup
Official roster		Coaching staff
Pitchers: 38 Alexane Fournier; 33 Sophy Gagné; 30 Alizée Gélinas; 3 Elizabeth Gilder; 2 Amy Johnson; 36 Jaida Lee; 18 Raine Padgham; 27 Michelle Roche; 17 Tess Sawkins; 16 Allison Schroder	Catchers: 11 Lucie Anctil; 14 Kaitlyn Ross; Infielders: 25 Ela Day-Bédard; 38 Alexane Fournier; 30 Alizée Gélinas; 13 Zoe Hicks; 45 Andréanne Leblanc; 17 Tess Sawkins; 6 Mia Valcke; 4 Madison Willan; Outfielders: 21 Emily Baxter; 8 Sena Catterall; 24 Cassie Matlock; 17 Tess Sawkins	Manager: 39 Anthony Pluta; Coaches: 29 Aaron Myette (Pitching Coach); 7 Katherine Psota (1st Base Coach); 12 Ashley Stephenson; 10 Patricia Landry

The roster for the 2015 Pan American Games.

- Melissa Armstrong (P)
- Amanda Asay (P/IF)
- Jessica Bérubé (P)
- Veronika Boyd (OF)
- Claire Eccles (P)
- Jenna Flannigan (OF)
- Rebecca Hartley (OF)
- Jennifer Gilroy (C)
- Kelsey Lalor (OF)
- Nicole Luchanski (IF)
- Daniella Matteucci (OF)
- Autumn Mills (P)
- Heidi Northcott (P)
- Katherine Psota (IF)
- Stéphanie Savoie (C)
- Ashley Stephenson (IF)
- Vanessa Riopel (P)
- Bradi Wall (IF)

Legend: C = Catcher, IF = Infielder, OF = Outfielder, P = Pitcher

== Competitive record ==
=== Women's Baseball World Cup ===
Women's Baseball World Cup record
Year	Round	Position	Pld	W	L	RS	RA
(Canada) 2004	Third Place	(bronze) 3rd	6	3	3	27	19
(Taiwan) 2006	Round-robin	(bronze) 3rd	6	4	2	36	29
(Japan) 2008	Finals	(silver) 2nd	6	4	2	53	26
(Venezuela) 2010	2nd Round	5th	7	4	3	48	40
(Canada) 2012	Bronze Medal	(bronze) 3rd	9	7	2	105	60
(Japan) 2014	Bronze Medal	4th	6	2	4	36	27
(South Korea) 2016	Finals	(silver) 2nd	8	6	2	51	28
(United States) 2018	Bronze Medal	(bronze) 3rd	9	6	3	75	29
(Mexico) 2021	Cancelled due to the COVID-19 pandemic						
(Canada) (Japan) 2024	Third Playoff	(bronze) 3rd	10	8	2	92	66
Total	Runners-up	9/10	67	44	23	-	-

=== Pan American Games ===
Pan American Games record
Year	Result	Position	Pld	W	L	RS	RA
(Canada) 2015	Silver medal	2nd	5	4	1	35	13
Total	Runners-up	1/1	5	4	1	35	13

== Awards and honours ==
- Amanda Asay, Finalist, 2006 Tip O'Neill Award
- Amanda Asay, 2006 IBAF World Cup Tournament All-Star (First Base)
- Kate Psota, 2010 IBAF World Cup Tournament All-Star (First Base)
- Kate Psota, 2012 IBAF World Cup Tournament All-Star (First Base)
- Ashley Stephenson, 2008 IBAF World Cup Tournament All-Star (Third Base)
- Ashley Stephenson, Jimmy Rattlesnake Award

=== Team MVP ===
Year	Player	Province	Position
2005	Ashley Stephenson	Ontario	Third base
2006	Amanda Asay	British Columbia	First base
2008	Ashley Stephenson	Ontario	Third base
2009	Kate Psota	Ontario	First base
2010	Kate Psota	Ontario	First base
2011	Meagan Cornelssen	Alberta	Outfield
2012	Stéphanie Savoie	Quebec	Catcher
2013	Stéphanie Savoie	Quebec	Catcher
2014	Stéphanie Savoie	Quebec	Catcher
2015	Nicole Luchanski	Alberta	Second base
2016	Amanda Asay	British Columbia	First base
2017	Nicole Luchanski	Alberta	Second base
2018	Daphnée Gélinas	Quebec	Infielder
2019	Kelsey Lalor	Alberta	Outfield
2021	Ellie Jespersen	Alberta	Infielder
2022	Zoe Hicks	Manitoba	Third baseman
2023	Zoe Hicks	Manitoba	Third baseman

Source: Baseball Canada
