= United States women's national baseball team =

Information
- Country: United States
- Federation: USA Baseball
- Confederation: WBSC Americas

WBSC ranking
- Current: 2 (31 December 2025)

Women's World Cup
- Appearances: 9 (first in 2004)
- Best result: (gold) 1st (2 times, in 2004 and 2006)

Medal record

Women's World Cup
| Gold medal – first place | 2004 Edmonton | |
| Gold medal – first place | 2006 Taipei | |
| Silver medal – second place | 2012 Edmonton | |
| Silver medal – second place | 2014 Miyazaki | |
| Silver medal – second place | 2024 Thunder Bay | |
| Bronze medal – third place | 2008 Matsuyama | |
| Bronze medal – third place | 2010 Maracay | |

Pan American Games
| Gold medal – first place | 2015 Toronto | Team |

The United States women's national baseball team represents the United States in international women's baseball competitions. It is controlled by USA Baseball and is a member of WBSC Americas.

== Rosters ==
=== Current roster ===
Roster selected for the 2027 Women's Baseball World Cup group stage

United States roster – 2027 Women's Baseball World Cup Group A
| Official roster | | Coaching staff |
| Pitchers: 18 Jillian Albayati; 27 Jordan Andreas; 11 Elise Berger; 4 Kate Blunt; 10 Bailey Brown; 13 Meggie Meidlinger; 6 Naomi Ryan; 19 Olivia Pichardo; 14 Kelsie Whitmore; 7 Adelaide Wilson | Catchers: 2 Denae Benites; 26 Alexia Jorge; Infielders: 18 Jillian Albayati; 5 Jamie Baum; 16 Alexandra Hugo; 22 Kylee Lahners; 21 Ashton Lansdell; 15 Sarah Lessig; 6 Naomi Ryan; 8 Remi Schaber; Outfielders: 18 Jillian Albayati; 3 Amira Hondras; 15 Sarah Lessig; 1 Ashanthy Marcano Vizcarrondo; 19 Olivia Pichardo; 6 Naomi Ryan; 14 Kelsie Whitmore; 7 Adelaide Wilson; Designated hitters: 18 Jillian Albayati; 6 Naomi Ryan; 8 Remi Schaber | Manager: 29 Michael Kinkade; Coaches: 23 Kristin Caldwell (1st Base Coach); 34 Jason Sekany (Pitching Coach); 28 Tanner Vesely (Bench Coach) |

=== 2024 Women's World Cup ===
Roster selected for the 2024 Women's Baseball World Cup Finals

United States roster – 2024 Women's Baseball World Cup
| Official roster | | Coaching staff |
| Pitchers: 18 Jillian Albayati; 5 Jamie Baum; 11 Elise Berger; 15 Kate Blunt; 23 Sophia Broderick; 3 Cody Eckert; 13 Megan Meidlinger; 4 Naomi Ryan; 12 Remi Schaber; 14 Kelsie Whitmore | Catchers: 2 Denae Benites; 17 Elizabeth Greenwood; 9 Anna Kimbrell; Infielders: 5 Jamie Baum; 2 Denae Benites; 15 Kate Blunt; 23 Sophia Broderick; 10 Amanda Gianelloni; 17 Elizabeth Greenwood; 16 Alexandra Hugo; 9 Anna Kimbrell; 22 Kylee Lahners; 21 Ashton Lansdell; 1 A'Lana Martinez; 27 Valerie Perez; 12 Remi Schaber; Outfielders: 18 Jillian Albayati; 3 Cody Eckert; 10 Amanda Gianelloni; 21 Ashton Lansdell; 1 A'Lana Martinez; 19 Olivia Pichardo; 4 Naomi Ryan | Manager: 8 Veronica Alvarez; Coaches: 34 Reynol Mendoza (Pitching Coach); 6 Malaika Underwood (3rd Base Coach) |

=== 2015 Pan American Games ===
The United States women's national baseball team announced their roster for the 2015 Pan American Games on May 24, 2015. The final roster as of July 19, 2015 is listed below.

- Veronica Alvarez (C)
- Ryleigh Buck (P/IF)
- Samantha Cobb (P/OF)
- Alex Fulmer (P)
- Veronica Gajownik (P/IF)
- Brittany Gomez (OF)
- Jade Gortarez (P/IF)
- Tamara Holmes (OF)
- Sarah Hudek (P/OF)
- Anna Kimbrell (P/C)
- Jenna Marston (P/IF)
- Stacy Piagno (P)
- Nicole Rivera (P/IF)
- Cydnee Sanders (P/IF)
- Marti Sementelli (P)
- Michelle Snyder (P/IF)
- Malaika Underwood (IF)
- Kelsie Whitmore (P/OF)

Legend: C = Catcher, IF = Infielder, OF = Outfielder, P = Pitcher

== Tournament records ==
=== Women's World Cup ===
The United States team has participated in every edition of the Women's World Cup. The United States team has won twice, finished second three times, and finished third twice.

Women's Baseball World Cup record
| Year | Result | Position | Pld | W | L | % | RS | RA |
|---|---|---|---|---|---|---|---|---|
| (Canada) 2004 | Champions | 1st | 6 | 5 | 1 | .833 | 33 | 10 |
| (Taiwan) 2006 | Champions | 1st | 6 | 5 | 1 | .833 | 51 | 23 |
| (Japan) 2008 | Third place | 3rd | 6 | 4 | 2 | .667 | 62 | 23 |
| (Venezuela) 2010 | Third place | 3rd | 9 | 5 | 4 | .556 | 74 | 43 |
| (Canada) 2012 | Runners-up | 2nd | 9 | 6 | 3 | .667 | 75 | 41 |
| (Japan) 2014 | Runners-up | 2nd | 6 | 4 | 2 | .667 | 37 | 12 |
| (South Korea) 2016 | First round | 7th | 7 | 6 | 1 | .857 | 77 | 13 |
| (United States) 2018 | Fourth Place | 4th | 9 | 6 | 3 | .667 | 67 | 19 |
| (Mexico) 2021 | Cancelled due to the COVID-19 pandemic | | | | | | | |
| (Canada) (Japan) 2024 | Runners-up | 2nd | 10 | 9 | 1 | .900 | 112 | 21 |
| Total | 2 Titles | 9/10 | 68 | 50 | 18 | .735 | 588 | 205 |

=== Pan American Games ===
The United States won a gold medal at the 2015 Pan American Games tournament in Toronto, Ontario, Canada. This was the first time a women's baseball tournament was held as part of the Pan American Games.

Pan American Games record
| Year | Result | Position | Pld | W | L | % | RS | RA |
|---|---|---|---|---|---|---|---|---|
| (Canada) 2015 | Gold medal | 1st | 5 | 5 | 0 | 1.000 | 44 | 10 |
| Total | 1 Title | 1/1 | 5 | 5 | 0 | 1.000 | 44 | 10 |

== Bibliography ==
- Ring, Jennifer (2015). A Game of Their Own: Voices of Contemporary Women in Baseball. Nebraska: University of Nebraska Press. ISBN 978-0803244801.
