= 2004 Women's Baseball World Cup =

Baseball competition

Tournament details
- Country: Canada
- City: Edmonton
- Dates: July 30 - August 8
- Teams: 5
- Defending champions: N/A -Inaugural Tournament

Final positions
- Champions: United States (1st title)
- Runners-up: Japan
- Third place: Canada
- Fourth place: Australia

Tournament statistics
- Games played: 14
- Best BA: (Australia) Shae Lillywhite (.556)
- Most SBs: (Japan) Miyuki Otomo (6)
- Best ERA: (United States) Dominisha Britton (0.00)

Awards
- MVP: (United States) Laura Brenneman

The 2004 IBAF Women's Baseball World Cup was held from July 30 to August 8, 2004 in Edmonton, Alberta, Canada and won by the United States. It was the first Women's Baseball World Cup and was sanctioned by the International Baseball Federation.

Competing teams were Australia, Canada, Chinese Taipei (Taiwan), Japan, USA. India and Bulgaria were scheduled to compete, but withdrew before the tournament.

== Final results ==
Pos.	Team	W	L
1st place, gold medalist(s)	United States	5	1
2nd place, silver medalist(s)	Japan	3	3
3rd place, bronze medalist(s)	Canada	3	3
4	Australia	2	4
5	Chinese Taipei	0	4

== Results ==
July 30, 2004	Chinese Taipei	5 – 7	Australia

July 30, 2004	Canada	8 – 10 (F/8)	Japan

July 31, 2004	Chinese Taipei	4 – 5 (F/9)	Japan

July 31, 2004	Australia	1 – 5	United States

August 1, 2004	United States	5 – 4 (F/9)	Japan

August 2, 2004	United States	1 – 2	Canada

August 3, 2004	Japan	1 – 7	Australia

August 4, 2004	Canada	3 – 2	Chinese Taipei

August 4, 2004	United States	8 – 1	Chinese Taipei

August 5, 2004	Australia	5 – 0	Canada

August 7, 2004; Semi Final	Australia	2 – 12 (F/6)	United States

August 7, 2004; Semi Final	Japan	3 – 1 (F/8)	Canada

August 8, 2004; 3rd Playoff	Australia	3 – 8	Canada

August 8, 2004; Final	Japan	0 – 2	United States

== All-Star team ==
Position	Player	Nation
Pitchers	Laura Purser-Rose	United States
Pitchers	Hanami Watanabe	Japan
Catchers	Genevieve Beauchamp	Canada
Catchers	Alex Sickinger	United States
First Baseman	Samantha Magalas	Canada
Second Baseman	Laura Brenneman	United States
Third Baseman	Chelsea Forkin	Australia
Shortstop	Yu Kawamoto	Japan
Outfielders	Karine Gagné	Canada
Outfielders	Melanie Harwood	Canada
Outfielders	Kim Braatz-Voisard	United States
Designated Hitter	Katie Gaynor	Australia
