= 2006 Women's Baseball World Cup =

Baseball World Cup

Tournament details
- Country: Taiwan
- City: Taipei
- Dates: July 31 - August 6
- Teams: 7
- Defending champions: United States

Final positions
- Champions: United States (2nd title)
- Runners-up: Japan
- Third place: Canada
- Fourth place: Australia

Tournament statistics
- Games played: 21
- Best BA: (Japan) Tomomi Nishi (.625)
- Most HRs: (Japan) Ayumi Ota (1)
- Most SBs: (Australia) Samantha Hamilton (6)
- Best ERA: (Chinese Taipei) Feng-Yin Cheng (0.00)

Awards
- MVP: (United States) Donna Mills

The 2006 IBAF Women's Baseball World Cup was held from July 31 to August 6 in Taipei, Taiwan and won by the United States. The tournament was a round-robin format, with the U.S. defeating Japan on the final day of the tournament to win the championship.

== Final results ==
Pos.	Team	W	L	RS	RA
1st place, gold medalist(s)	United States	5	1	51	23
2nd place, silver medalist(s)	Japan	4	2	92	25
3rd place, bronze medalist(s)	Canada	4	2	36	29
4	Australia	4	2	48	28
5	Chinese Taipei	3	3	37	19
6	Cuba	1	5	30	56
7	Hong Kong	0	6	8	122

== All-Star Team ==
Position	Player	Nation
Pitchers	Lin-Pei Chun	Chinese Taipei
Pitchers	Simone Wearne	Australia
Catchers	Tomomi Takashima	Japan
First base	Amanda Asay	Canada
Second base	Shae Lillywhite	Australia
Third base	Donna Mills	United States
Shortstop	Ayumi Ota	Japan
Outfielders	Amy McCann	Australia
Outfielders	Bridget Veenema	United States
Outfielders	Kim Voisard	United States
Designated hitter	Tomomi Nishi	Japan

== Awards ==
- Most valuable player: (United States) Donna Mills
- Outstanding defensive player: (Japan) Tomomi Takashima
- Champion manager: (United States) Julie Croteau

== See also ==
- List of sporting events in Taiwan
