= 2008 Women's Baseball World Cup =

Tournament details
- Country: Japan
- City: Matsuyama
- Dates: August 24–29
- Teams: 8
- Defending champions: United States

Final positions
- Champions: Japan (1st title)
- Runners-up: Canada
- Third place: United States
- Fourth place: Australia

Tournament statistics
- Games played: 22
- Best BA: (Japan) Tomomi Takashima (.733)
- Most HRs: (Japan) Natsumi Nakano (1)
- Most SBs: (Canada) Ashley Stephenson (5)
- Best ERA: (Japan) Kasumi Noguchi (0.00)

Awards
- MVP: (Japan) Kasumi Noguchi

The 2008 IBAF Women's Baseball World Cup was held in Botchan Stadium at Matsuyama, Ehime, Japan and won by Japan.

== Final results ==
Pos.	Team	W	L
1st place, gold medalist(s)	Japan	6	0
2nd place, silver medalist(s)	Canada	4	2
3rd place, bronze medalist(s)	United States	4	2
4	Australia	2	4
5	Chinese Taipei	3	2
6	South Korea	2	3
7	India	1	4
8	Hong Kong	0	5

== Results ==
August 24, 2008	United States	11 – 5	Chinese Taipei	Botchan Stadium

August 24, 2008	Hong Kong	9 – 19 (F/5)	Canada	Botchan Stadium

August 24, 2008	India	0 – 15 (F/5)	Australia	Botchan Stadium

August 24, 2008	Japan	11 – 0 (F/5)	South Korea	Botchan Stadium

August 25, 2008	United States	27 – 0 (F/4)	India	Botchan Stadium

August 25, 2008	South Korea	15 – 5 (F/5)	Hong Kong	Botchan Stadium

August 25, 2008	Australia	12 – 0 (F/6)	Chinese Taipei	Botchan Stadium

August 25, 2008	Canada	2 – 12 (F/5)	Japan	Botchan Stadium

August 26, 2008	Chinese Taipei	6 – 0	India	Botchan Stadium

August 26, 2008	Canada	15 – 0 (F/4)	South Korea	Botchan Stadium

August 26, 2008	Australia	1 – 11 (F/6)	United States	Botchan Stadium

August 26, 2008	Japan	24 – 1 (F/4)	Hong Kong	Botchan Stadium

August 27, 2008	Hong Kong	2 – 16 (F/5)	Chinese Taipei	Botchan Stadium

August 27, 2008	Canada	7 – 6	United States	Botchan Stadium

August 27, 2008	India	7 – 9	South Korea	Botchan Stadium

August 27, 2008	Australia	1 – 10	Japan	Botchan Stadium

August 28, 2008	Japan	9 – 5	United States	Botchan Stadium

August 28, 2008	Australia	6 – 7	Canada	Botchan Stadium

August 29, 2008	South Korea	1 – 16 F/4	Chinese Taipei	Botchan Stadium

August 29, 2008	Hong Kong	6 – 8	India	Botchan Stadium

August 29, 2008	United States	2 – 1	Australia	Botchan Stadium

August 29, 2008	Canada	3 – 11	Japan	Botchan Stadium

== All-Star team ==
Position	Player	Nation
Pitcher	Marti Sementelli	United States
Catcher	Tomomi Nishi	Japan
First Baseman	Yukiko Kon	Japan
Second Baseman	Malaika Underwood	United States
Third Baseman	Ashley Stephenson	Canada
Shortstop	Kyoko Makino	Japan
Outfielders	Nodoka Harada	Japan
Outfielders	Angela Catford	Australia
Outfielders	Lilly Jacobson	United States
Designated Hitter	Tomomi Takashima	Japan
