= List of Pan American Games medalists in baseball =

This is the complete list of Pan American Games medalists in baseball from 1951 to 2019.

== Medalists ==
=== Men's ===
Games	Gold	Silver	Bronze
1951	Cuba: Juan Izaguirre; Angel Scull; Derubin Jácome; Juan Vistuer; Angelio Brito; Luís Fiuza; Leonardo Feijo; Aurélio Herrera; Juan Ravelo; Gustavo Martínez; Osvaldo Orgalles; Marío Díaz; Nélson Campbell; Jorge Silva; Gilberto Delgado; Celso Oviedo	United States: Frank Wehner; Stanley Johnson; Junie Floyd; Bob Colufti; Jack Stallings; Wiley Warren; Ellsworth "Kay" Rogers; Jack Liptak; Don Woodlief; Max Eller; Alton "Tunney" Brooks; Dick McCleney	Mexico: Antonio Mondragon; R. de Hoyos; G. Figueroa; Manuel Contreras; Nicolas Genestas; H. Leal; R. López Ortíz; J. Sánchez; A. Uribe; R. Delgado; Sabino García; A. Méndez; R. Cárdenas; M. López Ortíz; A. Flores; J. López Ruíz; Fernando García; Alberto Sosa
1955	Dominican Republic: Rafael Quezada; Manuel Valdespino; Domingo Vargas; Miguel Marcelino; Pedro Pablo Tineo; Carlos Dore; Fabio Fiallo; Manuel Infante; Felipe Alou; José A. Capellán; Julián Javier; Roy Donald; Atilano Domínguez; Teodoro Rodríguez; Rafael Andújar; Wilfredo Echevarría; Luis Henríquez	United States: Paul Ebert; Arlan Barber; Bill Lore; Bob Jingling; Carl Thomas; Jerry Schoonmaker; James Temp; Don Lukaszewski; Vince Magi; Lamont Geiger; Raymond Hyde; Kenneth DeCarlo; John Garten; William Cary; Jerry Cloutier; Bob Schnorbus; Louis Scarborough	Venezuela: Francisco Cirimeli; Antonio Martínez; Manuel Fernández; Jaime Barroso; José Matos; Eladio Reverón; Rubén Millán; Jorge Aquiles Gómez; Argenis Gil; Pedro Gómez; Elio Chacón; José Garrido; Emiro Alvarez; Carlos Loreto; Julio Pirela; Luis Angel González; Francisco López; Andrés Quintero
1959	Venezuela: Rubén Millán; Francisco López; William Tronconis; Eduardo Amaya; Miguel Giron; José Flores; Tadeo Flores; Raúl Landaeta; Dámaso Blanco; Domingo Martín; Luis Manuel Hernández; Manuel Pérez Bolaños; Luis Peñalver; José Pérez; Lucas Ferreira; Enrique Capecchi; Francisco Oliveros	Puerto Rico: Carlos Pizarro; Santiago Rosario; Angel Fuentes; Reinaldo Vásquez; Luís Marrero; Jorge Pacheco; Ignacio Rios; Héctor Valle; José A. Meléndez; José Marrero; Irmo Figueroa; Raúl Rodríguez; Juan López; José V. Meléndez; José Calderon; Héctor Santiago; Enrique Irizarri; Ricardo Delgado	United States: Lou Brock; Ron Causton; Ty Cline; Charles Davis; Jerry Droscher; Terry Gellinger; Alan Hall; Ralph Hochgrebe; Robert Hoover; Arley Kangous; Allen Kennedy; Ron Klepfer; Jack McCartan; Perry McGriff; William Mansfield; Grayson Mersch; Tom Orton; Roger Rudeen
1963	Cuba: Franklyn Aspillaga; Antonio Rubio; Daniel Hernández; Fidel Linares; Jorge Trigoura; Lázaro Pérez; António González; Pedro Chávez; Ramón Hechevarría; Raúl Ortega; Modesto Verdura; Ricardo Lazo; Pastor Rodriguez; Santiago Scott; Miguel Cuevas; Aquino Abreu; Urbano González; Manuel Alarcón; Rolando Pastor	United States: Barry Bruckner; Victor Johnson; Larry Tucker; James Westervelt; Robert Jenkins; Douglas Mills; Ted Tollner; Charles Roys; Robert Overman; James Hollister; L. Ferg Norton; Alan DeJardin; Robert Hoover; Richard Mooney; Steve Smith; Archie Moore; Wilson Parma; Thomas H. Jenk	Mexico: Arnold Armenta; Arturo Navarro; Carlos Sánchez; Cirilo Magdaleno; Daniel Navarro; Elias Mier; José Garibay; José Parcero; José Rodríguez; Luís Esma; Luís García; Marío Aguirre; Miguel Ángel Tapia; Pedro Rodríguez; Reynaldo Rodríguez; Roberto Ortíz; Sérgio Murillo; Tomás Valenzuela
1967	United States: Ray Blosse; Daniel Carlson; John Curtis; Barry Debolt; Dennis Lamb; Jack Kraus; Mike Lisetski; Mark Marquess; Tim Plodinec; Joe Sadelfield; Kenneth Smith; Steve Sogge; Jim Spencer; Paul Splittorff; Kenneth Szotkiewicz; George Greer; Taylor Toomey; William Wright	Cuba: Manuel Alarcón; Rigoberto Betancourt; Pedro Chávez; Miguel Cuevas; Antonio Gonzalez; Urbano Gonzalez; Ramon Hechevarria; Félix Isasi; Antonio Jiménez; Fermín Laffita; Ricardo Lazo; Elpidio Mancebo; Lazaro Perez; Gaspar Pérez; Felix Rosa; Felipe Sarduy; Alfredo Street; Jesus Torriente; Roberto Valdes	Puerto Rico: Javier Andino; Anibal Baerga; Jose Baez; Luis Camacho; Angel Davila; Heriberto Feliciano; Samuel Garcia; Julio Maysonet; Luis Medina; Francisco Mercado; Ramon Nieves; Ramon Ortiz; Pedro Pacheco; Milton Ramirez; Jose Ramos; Carlos Rodriguez; Antonio Rodriguez; Raul Vives
1971	Cuba: Wilfredo Sánchez; Silvio Montejo; Félix Isasi; Armando Capiró; Agustín Marquetti; Vicente Díaz; Lázaro Pérez; Rodolfo Puente; Emilio Salgado; Urbano González; Lázaro Martínez; Rigoberto Rosique; Rolando Macías; Óscar Romero; Braudilio Vinent; José Antonio Huelga; Walfrido Ruíz; Antônio González	United States: Eddie Bane; Alan Bannister; Larry Caluffetti; John Caneira; Bernardo Castillo; Peter Helt; Clifton Holland; Mario Hewitt; Fred Lynn; James Steele; Jerry Tabb; Jackson Todd; Alton Torregano; Fred Mims; Paul Patterson; Jeffrey Port; Kenneth Reed; Jay Smith	Colombia: José Corpas; Luis Herrera; Luis Escobar; Abel Leal; Luis Gaviria; Humberto Bayuelo; Pompeyo Llamas; Daniel Blanco; Rene Morelos; Remberto Madera; Luis Santos; Alejandro Lian; Alcibiades Jaramillo; Erasmo Marimon; Evaristo Martínez; Orlando Ramírez; Adolfo Jiménez; Benjamin Herrera; Orlando García
1975	Cuba: Julio Romero; Oscar Romero; Omar Carrero; Juan Pérez; Braudilio Vinent; Santiago Mederos; Lázaro Pérez; Evelio Hernández; Agustín Marquetti; Alfonso Urquiola; Félix Isasi; Osvaldo Oliva; Pedro José Rodríguez Sr.; Rodolfo Puente; Agustín Arias; Armando Capiró; Fermín Laffita; Fernando Sánchez; Antonio Muñoz; Wilfredo Sánchez	United States: Mark Daly; Don Hanna; Bob Owchinko; Steve Powers; Pete Redfern; Scott Sanderson; Mike Scott; Rich Wortham; Gary Allenson; Duane Gustavson; Ed Bahns; Ron Hassey; Wayne Krenchicki; Joe Strain; Paul Stevens; Rick Clopton; Steve Kemp; Dave Stegman; Eddie Stephenson; Jeff Carsley	Venezuela: Jesús Hernández; Evelio Ovalles; José Granados; Omar Marín; Arsenis Navas; Guillermo Guerra; William Hidalgo; José Luis Ayala; Ignacio Camero; Ornar Guzmán; Gustavo Rivas; Pedro Ávila; Ubaldo Alcedo; José Juárez; Luis González; Jesús Hernández; Miguel González; Luis Bravo; Victor Williams; Gustavo Bastardo
1979	Cuba: Rey Vicente Anglada; Armando Capiró; Luis Casanova; Rafael Castillo; Rogelio García; Jesús Guerra; Fernando Hernández; Pedro Jova; Agustín Marquetti; Alberto Martínez; Pedro Medina; Antonio Muñoz; Juan Carlos Oliva; Rodolfo Puente; Pedro José Rodríguez Sr.; Fernando Sánchez; Wilfredo Sánchez; Lázaro Santana; Alfonso Urquiola; Braudilio Vinent	Dominican Republic: Marcos Aguasvivas; Rafael Almonte; Rafael Belliard; Maney Cabreja; Pablo Cabrera; Iván Crispín; Quique Cruz; Orlando De León; Cecilio Guante; Orlando Guerrero; Rafael Harris; Jony Olivo; Juan Ortiz; Héctor Paniagua; Aquiles Peña; Manuel Peña; Felipe Polanco; Antonio Romero; Rafael Stephan	Puerto Rico: Carmelo Aguayo; Héctor Ayala; Angel Báez; Julio Bonilla; Luis Colón; Milton Crespo; Alejandro De Jesús; Jesús Feliciano; Víctor Gómez; Edwin Hernández; Ramón Lara; Carlos Lugo; Juan Martínez; Luis Mercado; Rogelio Negrón; Carlos Ponce; Mariano Quiñones; David Rodríguez; Angel Rodríguez; Obdulio Valentín
1983	Cuba: Pedro Medina; Juan Castro; Alberto Martínez; Antonio Muñoz; Alfonso Urquiola; Antonio Pacheco; Ramón Otamendi; Leonardo Goire; Pedro Jova; Amado Zamora; Fernando Hernández; Víctor Mesa; Lourdes Gourriel; Braudilio Vinent; Rogelio García; Julio Romero; Lázaro de la Torre; Jorge Luis Valdés; Mario Véliz; Félix Núñez	Nicaragua: Cruz Ulloa; Elvin Jarquin; Tomás Guzmán; Julio Moya; Diego Raudez; César Monge; Adolfo Álvarez; Luis Cano; Roberto Espino; Ariel Delgado; Julio Medina; Julio César Sánchez; Arnoldo Munoz; Alvaro Munoz; Cayetano García; Apolinar Cruz; Pablo Juárez; Danilo Sotelo Sr.; Leo Cárdenas; Roger López	United States: Vince Barger; Bill Swift; John Hoover; Doug Henry; Tim Belcher; Jeff Ballard; Todd Burns; B. J. Surhoff; John Marzano; Jim Puzey; Tom Scaletta; John Verducci; Jeff Paul; Keith Miller; Mark McGwire; Ben Abner; Eric Fox; John Fishel; Cory Snyder; Kevin Penner
1987	Cuba: Pablo Abreu; Omar Ajete; Luis Casanova; Juan Castro; Lázaro de la Torre; Jorge García; Rogelio García; Giraldo González; Lourdes Gourriel; Orestes Kindelán; Omar Linares; Pedro Medina; Víctor Mesa; Alejo O'Reilly; Antonio Pacheco; Euclides Rojas; Luis Tissert; Luis Ulacia; Jorge Luis Valdés; Lázaro Vargas	United States: Jim Abbott; Cris Carpenter; Mike Fiore; Larry Gonzales; Ty Griffin; Donald Guillot; Steve Hecht; Rick Hirtensteiner; Clyde Keller; Larry Lamphere; Scott Livingstone; Tino Martinez; Chris Nichting; Gregg Olson; Jim Poole; Scott Servais; Dave Silvestri; Joe Slusarski; Ed Sprague Jr.; Ted Wood	Puerto Rico: Eddie Ahorrio; Edwin Cuadrado; Gilberto Escalera; Jesús Feliciano; Luis Fontanez; Efraín García; Héctor Gutierrez; José Lorenzana; José Meléndez; Ángel Morales; José Ortiz; Edwin Pérez; Mariano Quiñones; Luis Ramos; Jorge Robles; Helson Rodriguez; Abimael Rosario; Josué Salva; Roberto Santana; Wilfredo Velez
1991	Cuba: Pedro Luis Rodríguez; Alberto Hernández; José Raúl Delgado; Lourdes Gourriel; Antonio Pacheco; Omar Linares; Lázaro Vargas; Germán Mesa; Luis Ulacia; Víctor Mesa; Orestes Kindelán; Ermidelio Urrutia; Romelio Martínez; Jorge Luis Valdés; Euclides Rojas; Osvaldo Fernández Guerra; Osvaldo Fernández Rodríguez; Osvaldo Duvergel; Leonardo Tamayo; Omar Ajete	Puerto Rico: José Lorenzana; Efrain Nieves Sr.; Efraín García; Roberto Lopez; Luis Ramos; Abimael Rosario; Manuel Serrano; Ernest Martinez; Angel A. Morales; Albert Bracero; Jorge Aranzamendi; Jesus I. Feliciano; Wilfredo Velez; Francisco Hernaiz; Jimmy Figueroa; Ariel Robles; Josue Salva; Rafael Santiago; Angel Fonseca; Armando Ríos	United States: John Dettmer; Todd Greene; Jason Giambi; Chris Gomez; Jeff Granger; Jeffrey Hammonds; Charles Johnson; Todd Johnson; Rick Helling; Dan Melendez; Craig Wilson; Tony Phillips; Chris Roberts; Steve Rodriguez; Paul Shuey; Kennie Steenstra; Todd Taylor; David Tuttle; Jeff Ware; Chris Wimmer
1995	Cuba: Juan Manrique; Pedro Luis Rodríguez; Orestes Kindelán; Jorge Toca; Lourdes Gourriel; Antonio Pacheco; Juan Padilla; Eduardo Paret; Germán Mesa; Omar Linares; Luis Ulacia; Ermidelio Urrutia; Víctor Mesa; José Estrada; Daniel Lazo; Pedro Luis Lazo; Omar Ajete; Rolando Arrojo; Eliecer Montes de Oca; José Ibar; Osvaldo Fernández; Orlando Hernández	Nicaragua: Oswaldo Mairena; Yader Soto; Jose Quiroz; Luis Miranda; Pedro Ramirez; Eduardo Bojorge; Guillermo Modragon; Roberto Mendoza; Julio Osejo; Jairo Mendoza; Jorge Avellan; Julio Medina; Norman Cardoze; Nemesio Porras; Henry Roa; Ariel Delgado; Bayardo Davila; Richard Hunter; Sandy Moreno; Anibal Vega; Jose Ramon Padilla; Carlos Berrios	Puerto Rico: Jose Fortis; Nelson Sanchez; David Melendez; Ramon Montanez; José Mateo; Orville Batista; Luis Victoria; Wilfredo Velez; Jose Lorenzano; Efrain Nieves Sr.; Efrain Garcia; José Miranda; Carlos Márquez; Jaime Roque; Juan Montero; Luis Ramos; Abimael Rosario; Alberto Bracero; Angel A. Morales; Jorge Aranzamendi; Joel Perez; Omar Hernandez
1999	Cuba: Danys Báez; Danel Castro; José Contreras; Faustino Corrales; Yobal Dueñas; Michel Enríquez; José Ibar; Orestes Kindelán; Daniel Lazo; Pedro Luis Lazo; Ciro Silvino Licea; Omar Linares; Juan Manrique; Isaac Martínez; Javier Méndez; Germán Mesa; Juan Padilla; Ariel Pestano; Gabriel Pierre; Maels Rodríguez; Ormari Romero; Norge Luis Vera; Robelquis Videaux; Luis Ulacia	United States: Ryan Anderson; Peter Bergeron; Milton Bradley; Travis Dawkins; Shawn Gilbert; Charlie Greene; Jason Hardtke; David Holdridge; Marcus Jensen; Adam Kennedy; Matthew LeCroy; Mark Mulder; Mike Neill; Craig Paquette; John Patterson; Brad Penny; Dave Roberts; J. C. Romero; Bobby Seay; Scott Stewart; Derek Wallace; Dan Wheeler; Todd Williams; Jon Zuber	Canada: Todd Betts; Rob Butler; Stubby Clapp; Lee Delfino; Colin Dixon; Troy Fortin; Aaron Guiel; Jason Gooding; Jason Green; Steve Green; Yan Lachapell; Clint Lawrence; Julien Lepine; Matt Logan; Mike Meyers; Aaron Myette; Ryan Radmanovich; Mark Randall; Chad Ricketts; Dave Ross; Andy Stewart; Matt Stockman; Julien Tucker; Jeremy Ware
2003	Cuba: Yovany Aragón; Orelvis Ávila; Manuel Benavides; Frederich Cepeda; Michel Enríquez; Yuli Gurriel; Vladimir Hernández; Roger Machado; Yadel Martí; Javier Méndez; Vicyohandri Odelín; Adiel Palma; Eduardo Paret; Joan Carlos Pedroso; Ariel Pestano; Alexander Ramos; Carlos Tabares; Norge Luis Vera; Robelquis Videaux	United States: Matt Campbell; Jeff Clement; Tyler Greene; Michael Griffin; Stephen Head; Paul Janish; Jeff Larish; Brent Lillibridge; Mike Nickeas; Justin Orenduff; Micah Owings; Eric Patterson; Dustin Pedroia; Danny Putnam; Steven Register; Mark Romanczuk; Seth Smith; Huston Street; Justin Verlander; Jered Weaver	Mexico: Rigo Beltrán; Lorenzo Buelna; Francisco Campos; Hugo Castellanos; Francisco Córdova; Luis García; Heber Gómez; Julio Hernández; Édgar Huerta; Edgar Leyva; Ray Martínez; Roberto Méndez; Eleazar Mora; Noé Muñoz; Pablo Ortega; Carlos Rodríguez; Salvador Rodríguez; Raúl Sánchez; Mario Santana; Roberto Saucedo; Mario Váldez; Julio Valerio
2007	Cuba: Frederich Cepeda; Yoenis Céspedes; Aroldis Chapman; Giorvis Duvergel; Norberto González; Yuli Gurriel; Pedro Luis Lazo; Jonder Martínez; Yunesky Maya; Alexander Mayeta; Luis Miguel Navas; Adiel Palma; Eduardo Paret; Ariel Pestano; Alexei Ramírez; Elier Sánchez; Eriel Sánchez; Yoandry Urgellés; Osmani Urrutia; Norge Luis Vera	United States: Pedro Álvarez; Ryan Berry; Jordan Danks; Danny Espinosa; Ryan Flaherty; Logan Forsythe; Brett Hunter; Joe Kelly; Roger Kieschnick; Lance Lynn; Brian Matusz; Tommy Medica; Jordy Mercer; Petey Paramore; Josh Romanski; Tyson Ross; Cody Satterwhite; Justin Smoak; Jake Thompson; Brett Wallace	Mexico: Jorge Campillo; Francisco Campos; Rafael Diaz Adame; Efren Espinoza; Karim García; Luis García; Benji Gil; Gerónimo Gil; José Silva; Noé Muñoz; Pablo Ortega; Roberto Ramírez; Oscar Rivera Ruiz; Jose Luis Sandoval; Luis Mauricio Suarez; Mauricio Tequida Miranda; Ivan Terrazas Magaña; Mario Valdez
2007	Cuba: Frederich Cepeda; Yoenis Céspedes; Aroldis Chapman; Giorvis Duvergel; Norberto González; Yuli Gurriel; Pedro Luis Lazo; Jonder Martínez; Yunesky Maya; Alexander Mayeta; Luis Miguel Navas; Adiel Palma; Eduardo Paret; Ariel Pestano; Alexei Ramírez; Elier Sánchez; Eriel Sánchez; Yoandry Urgellés; Osmani Urrutia; Norge Luis Vera	United States: Pedro Álvarez; Ryan Berry; Jordan Danks; Danny Espinosa; Ryan Flaherty; Logan Forsythe; Brett Hunter; Joe Kelly; Roger Kieschnick; Lance Lynn; Brian Matusz; Tommy Medica; Jordy Mercer; Petey Paramore; Josh Romanski; Tyson Ross; Cody Satterwhite; Justin Smoak; Jake Thompson; Brett Wallace	Nicaragua: Jorge Luis Avellan; Norman Rene Cardoze; Larry Francisco Galeano; Yasmir Antonio Garcia; Sandor Guido; Armando de Jesus Hernandez; Hesse Estaly Loaisiga Palma; Edgard Roberto Lopez; Oswaldo Mairena; Sergio Antonio Mena; Jose Esteban Perez; Jairo Ramon Pineda; Luz de Jesús Portobanco; Julio Cesar Raudes; Pedro Wilder Rayo Rojas; Justo Cesar Rivas; Jenrry Antonio Roa Miranda; Jose Luis Saenz Morales; Danilo Francisco Sotelo; Eddy Orland Talavera
2011	Canada: Andrew Albers; Cole Armstrong; Chris Bisson; Shawn Bowman; Nick Bucci; Michael Crouse; Emerson Frostad; Mark Hardy; Jim Henderson; Shawn Hill; Jay Johnson; Mike Johnson; Chris Kissock; Brock Kjeldgaard; Marcus Knecht; Kyle Lotzkar; Jonathan Malo; Dustin Molleken; Scott Richmond; Chris Robinson; Jamie Romak; Tim Smith; Skyler Stromsmoe; Jimmy Van Ostrand	United States: Pete Andrelczyk; Jeff Beliveau; Brett Carroll; Justin Cassel; Matt Clark; Jordan Danks; C. J. Fick; James Gallagher; Drew Garcia; Tuffy Gosewisch; Brett Jackson; Jeff Marquez; James McCann; Tommy Mendonca; Jordy Mercer; Scott Patterson; A. J. Pollock; Todd Redmond; Matt Shoemaker; Drew Smyly; Joe Thurston; Chad Tracy; Andy Van Hekken; Randy Williams	Cuba: José Abreu; Yosvany Alarcón; Freddy Álvarez; Erisbel Arruebarrena; Alexeis Bell; Rusney Castillo; Frederich Cepeda; Alfredo Despaigne; Giorvis Duvergel; Michel Enríquez; Miguel González; Norberto González; Yulieski González; Yuli Gurriel; Dalier Hinojosa; Miguel Lahera; Jonder Martínez; Frank Morejón; Vicyohandri Odelín; Héctor Olivera; Yadier Pedroso; Ariel Pestano; Rudy Reyes; Alberto Soto
2015	Canada: Andrew Albers; Phillippe Aumont; Shane Dawson; Kellin Deglan; Brock Dykxhoorn; Jeff Francis; Tyson Gillies; Shawn Hill; Jesse Hodges; Sean Jamieson; Brock Kjeldgaard; Jordan Lennerton; Chris Leroux; Kyle Lotzkar; Jared Mortensen; Tyler O'Neill; Pete Orr; Jasvir Rakkar; Scott Richmond; Chris Robinson; Evan Rutckyj; Tim Smith; Skyler Stromsmoe; Rene Tosoni	United States: Albert Almora; Jake Barrett; Buddy Baumann; Jeff Bianchi; Aaron Blair; Brian Bogusevic; Casey Coleman; Zach Eflin; Brian Ellington; Cam Gallagher; Josh Hader; David Huff; Travis Jankowski; Patrick Kivlehan; Casey Kotchman; Scott McGregor; Tommy Murphy; Andy Parrino; Tyler Pastornicky; Paul Sewald; Nate Smith; Jake Thompson* Mac Williamson; Jacob Wilson	Cuba: Roel Santos; Raul Gonzalez; Rudy Reyes; Yosvany Alarcón; Freddy Álvarez; Urmaris Guerra; Ismel Jiménez; Frederich Cepeda; Yander Guevara; Adolis García; Héctor Mendoza; Yorbis Borroto; Yordan Manduley; Frank Morejón; Erly Casanova; Alfredo Despaigne; Alexander Malleta; Yosvani Torres; Yoanni Yera; Yulexis La Rosa; William Saavedra; Lázaro Blanco; Liván Moinelo; Yennier Canó
2019	Puerto Rico: Fernando Cabrera; Freddie Cabrera; Luis Cintrón; Fernando Cruz; Jeffrey Domínguez; Bryan Escanio; Edwin Gómez; Jay González; Andrés López; Kevin Luciano; Brahiam Maldonado; Iván Maldonado; Miguel Martínez; Ozzie Martínez; Luis Mateo; Efraín Nieves; Jorge Padilla; José Rivera; César Rivera; Wilfredo Rodríguez; Orlando Román; Ramesis Rosa; Giovanni Soto; Kevin Torres	Canada: Ben Abram; Phillippe Aumont; Jordan Balazovic; Eric Cerantola; Michael Crouse; Wes Darvill; RJ Freure; Tyson Gillies; Dustin Houle; Edouard Julien; Ryan Kellogg; Jordan Lennerton; Chris Leroux; Jonathan Malo; Will McAffer; Dustin Molleken; Connor Panas; Tristan Pompey; Jordan Procyshen; Jasvir Rakkar; Scott Richmond; Evan Rutckyj; Rene Tosoni; Eric Wood	Nicaragua: Benjamín Alegría; Luis Alen; Isaac Benard; Jimmy Bermúdez; Dwight Britton; Jorge Bucardo; Wilber Bucardo; Jilton Calderón; Darrel Campbell; Ofilio Castro; Berman Espinoza; Rafael Estrada; Fidencio Flores; Jesús Garrido; Ernesto Glasgon; Elías Gutiérrez; Wilton López; Gustavo Martínez; Marvin Martínez; Edgard Montiel; Javier Robles; Junior Téllez; Norlando Valle; Wuillians Vasquez

=== Women's ===
Games	Gold	Silver	Bronze
2015	United States: Veronica Alvarez; Ryleigh Buck; Samantha Cobb; Alex Fulmer; Veronica Gajownik; Brittany Gomez; Jade Gortarez; Tamara Holmes; Sarah Hudek; Anna Kimbrell; Jenna Marston; Stacy Piagno; Nicole Rivera; Cydnee Sanders; Marti Sementelli; Michelle Snyder; Malaika Underwood; Kelsie Whitmore	Canada: Melissa Armstrong; Amanda Asay; Jessica Bérubé; Veronika Boyd; Claire Eccles; Jenna Flannigan; Jennifer Gilroy; Rebecca Hartley; Kelsey Lalor; Nicole Luchanski; Daniella Matteucci; Autumn Mills; Heidi Northcott; Katherine Psota; Vanessa Riopel; Stéphanie Savoie; Ashley Stephenson; Bradi Wall	Venezuela: Migreily Angulo; Ofelia Arrieche; Sor Brito; Dayvis Cazorla; Giddelys Cumana; Ingrid Escobar; Osmari Garcia; Daily Gimenez; Lelis Gomez; Oriannys Hernandez; Kerlys Pérez; Marianne Pérez; Esquia Rengel; Leonela Reyes; Maria Rincon; Astrid Rodriguez; Patricia Segovia; Maigleth Torres
