= Baseball at the 2015 Pan American Games – Women's team rosters =

This article shows the rosters of all participating teams at the women's baseball tournament at the 2015 Pan American Games in Toronto. Rosters can have a maximum of 18 athletes.

== Canada ==
The Canada women's national baseball team announced their roster for the 2015 Pan American Games on May 17, 2015. The final roster (as of July 19, 2015):

- Melissa Armstrong (P)
- Amanda Asay (P/IF)
- Jessica Bérubé (P)
- Veronika Boyd (OF)
- Claire Eccles (P)
- Jenna Flannigan (OF)
- Rebecca Hartley (OF)
- Jennifer Gilroy (C)
- Kelsey Lalor (OF)
- Nicole Luchanski (IF)
- Daniella Matteucci (OF)
- Autumn Mills (P)
- Heidi Northcott (P)
- Katherine Psota (IF)
- Stéphanie Savoie (C)
- Ashley Stephenson (IF)
- Vanessa Riopel (P)
- Bradi Wall (IF)

Legend: C = Catcher, IF = Infielder, OF = Outfielder, P = Pitcher

== Cuba ==
The Cuba women's national baseball team roster for the 2015 Pan American Games (as of 19 July 2015):

- Leydis Arzuaga (C)
- Yurismary Baez (OF)
- Yulisa Barban (OF)
- Dayanna Batista (IF)
- Vania Cabrera (IF)
- Ana Castellanos (P)
- Yoidania Castro (P)
- Enelsy Cordovi (P)
- Yanet Cruz (P)
- Libia Duarte (IF)
- Jessica Herrera (IF)
- Yadira Lopez (P)
- Dianelis Munoz (OF)
- Odrisleisis Peguero (OF)
- Nilsa Rodriguez (IF)
- Yordanka Rodriguez (C)
- Mayumis Solano (P)
- Mariandy Torres (OF)

Legend: C = Catcher, IF = Infielder, OF = Outfielder, P = Pitcher

== Puerto Rico ==
The Puerto Rico women's national baseball team roster for the 2015 Pan American Games (as of July 19, 2015):

- Lisandra Berríos (IF)
- Angela Castro (U)
- Yinoska Claudio (IF)
- Katiria Dávila (P/IF)
- Noelia De Jesús (P)
- Luz Feliciano (P/IF)
- Dayaniris Flores (C)
- Marlene Gómez (OF)
- Kiara Hernández (P)
- Kiara Irizarry (IF)
- Julitza López (OF)
- Fiordelis Martínez (IF/OF)
- Michelle Martínez (OF)
- Adrix Paradizo (P/IF)
- Diamilette Quiles (IF)
- Janilis Rivera (C)
- Enid Santana (P)
- María Zayas (P)

Legend: C = Catcher, IF = Infielder, OF = Outfielder, P = Pitcher, U = Utility fielder

== United States ==
The United States women's national baseball team announced their roster for the 2015 Pan American Games on May 24, 2015. The final roster as of July 19, 2015 is listed below.

- Veronica Alvarez (C)
- Ryleigh Buck (P/IF)
- Samantha Cobb (P/OF)
- Alex Fulmer (P)
- Veronica Gajownik (P/IF)
- Brittany Gomez (OF)
- Jade Gortarez (P/IF)
- Tamara Holmes (OF)
- Sarah Hudek (P/OF)
- Anna Kimbrell (P/C)
- Jenna Marston (P/IF)
- Stacy Piagno (P)
- Nicole Rivera (P/IF)
- Cydnee Sanders (P/IF)
- Marti Sementelli (P)
- Michelle Snyder (P/IF)
- Malaika Underwood (IF)
- Kelsie Whitmore (P/OF)

Legend: C = Catcher, IF = Infielder, OF = Outfielder, P = Pitcher

== Venezuela ==
The Venezuela women's national baseball team roster for the 2015 Pan American Games (as of 19 July 2015).

- Migreily Angulo (C)
- Ofelia Arrieche (OF)
- Sor Brito (IF)
- Dayvis Cazorla (P)
- Giddelys Cumana (P)
- Ingrid Escobar (IF)
- Osmari Garcia (C)
- Daily Gimenez (IF)
- Lelis Gomez (IF)
- Oriannys Hernandez (P)
- Kerlys Pérez (P)
- Marianne Pérez (OF)
- Esquia Rengel (U)
- Leonela Reyes (OF)
- Maria Rincon (P)
- Astrid Rodriguez (U)
- Patricia Segovia (U)
- Maigleth Torres (IF)

Legend: C = Catcher, IF = Infielder, OF = Outfielder, P = Pitcher, U = Utility fielder
