= Baseball at the 2015 Pan American Games =

- Baseball pictogram for the 2015 games
- Venue: Pan Am Ball Park
- Dates: July 11–26
- No. of events: 2 (1 men, 1 women)
- Competitors: 258 from 8 nations

Baseball competitions at the 2015 Pan American Games in Toronto was held from July 11 to 26 at the Pan Am Ball Park, in Ajax, Ontario.

Women's baseball made its Pan American Games debut, after being added to the program at the 2013 Pan American Sports Organization's general assembly. A total of seven men's and five women's teams competed in each tournament respectively.

== Competition schedule ==
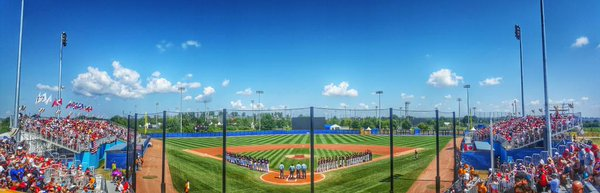
The Pan Am Ball Park in Ajax, was the venue for the baseball competitions

The following was the competition schedule for the baseball competitions:

P	Preliminaries	½	Semifinals	B	Bronze medal match	F	Final

Event↓/Date →	Sat 11	Sun 12	Mon 13	Tue 14	Wed 15	Thu 16	Fri 17	Sat 18	Sun 19		Mon 20	Tue 21	Wed 22	Thu 23	Fri 24	Sat 25	Sun 26
Men	P	P	P	P	P	P	P	½	B	F							
Women											P	P	P	P	P	B	F

== Medal summary ==
=== Medal table ===
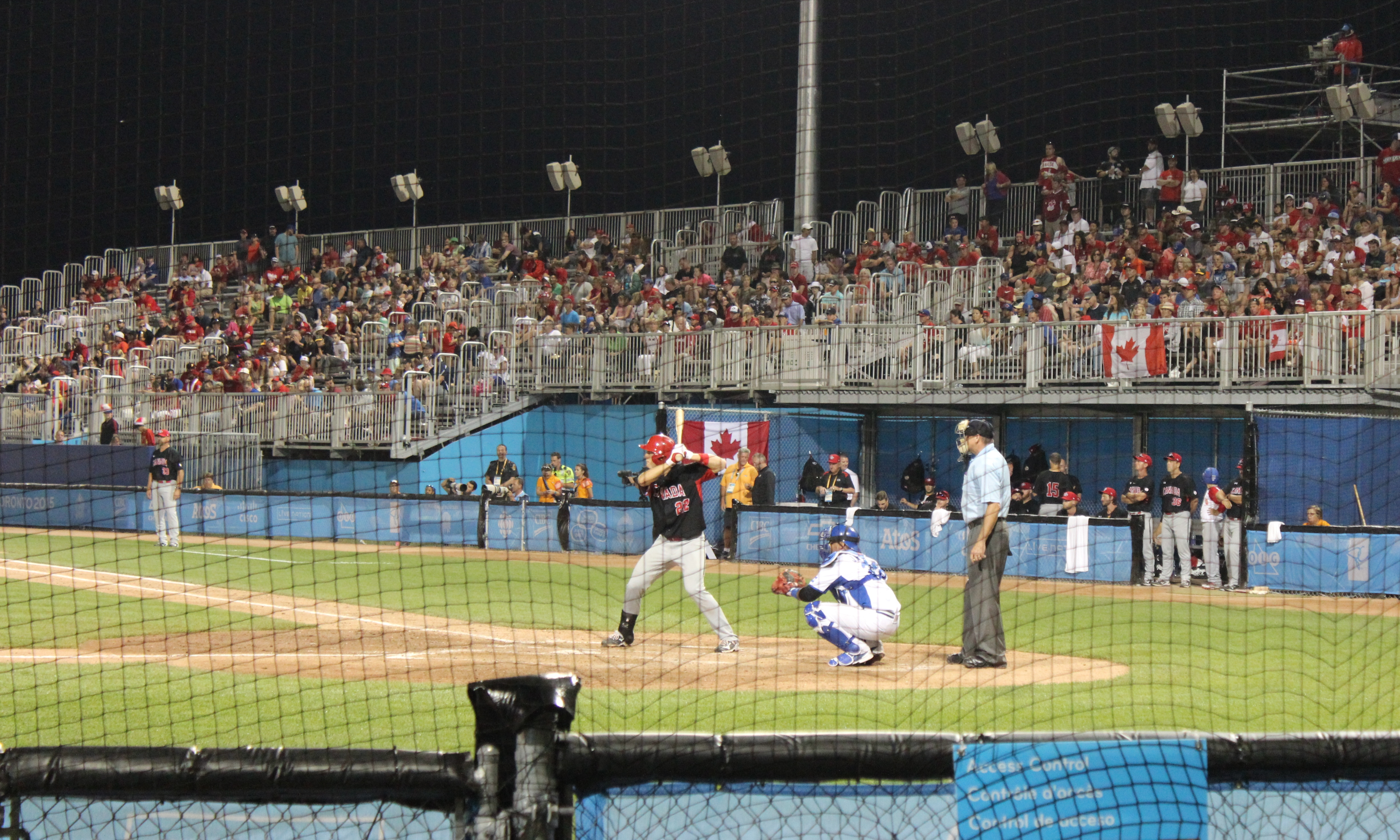
Baseball competition at the President's Choice Ajax Pan Am Ballpark

* Host nation (Canada)

Rank	Nation	Gold	Silver	Bronze	Total
1	Canada*	1	1	0	2
1	United States	1	1	0	2
3	Cuba	0	0	1	1
3	Venezuela	0	0	1	1
Totals (4 entries)		2	2	2	6

=== Medalists ===
Event	Gold	Silver	Bronze
Men's tournament	Canada: Andrew Albers; Phillippe Aumont; Shane Dawson; Kellin Deglan; Brock Dykxhoorn; Jeff Francis; Tyson Gillies; Shawn Hill; Jesse Hodges; Sean Jamieson; Brock Kjeldgaard; Jordan Lennerton; Chris Leroux; Kyle Lotzkar; Jared Mortensen; Tyler O'Neill; Pete Orr; Jasvir Rakkar; Scott Richmond; Chris Robinson; Evan Rutckyj; Tim Smith; Skyler Stromsmoe; Rene Tosoni	United States: Albert Almora; Jake Barrett; Buddy Baumann; Jeff Bianchi; Aaron Blair; Brian Bogusevic; Casey Coleman; Zach Eflin; Brian Ellington; Cam Gallagher; Josh Hader; David Huff; Travis Jankowski; Patrick Kivlehan; Casey Kotchman; Scott McGregor; Tommy Murphy; Andy Parrino; Tyler Pastornicky; Paul Sewald; Nate Smith; Jake Thompson; Mac Williamson; Jacob Wilson	Cuba: Roel Santos; Raúl González; Rudy Reyes; Yosvany Alarcón; Freddy Álvarez; Urmaris Guerra; Ismel Jiménez; Frederich Cepeda; Yander Guevara; Adolis García; Héctor Mendoza; Yorbis Borroto; Yordan Manduley; Frank Morejón; Erly Casanova; Alfredo Despaigne; Alexander Malleta; Yosvani Torres; Yoanni Yera; Yulexis La Rosa; William Saavedra; Lázaro Blanco; Liván Moinelo; Yennier Canó
Women's tournament	United States: Veronica Alvarez; Ryleigh Buck; Samantha Cobb; Alex Fulmer; Veronica Gajownik; Brittany Gomez; Jade Gortarez; Tamara Holmes; Sarah Hudek; Anna Kimbrell; Jenna Marston; Stacy Piagno; Nicole Rivera; Cydnee Sanders; Marti Sementelli; Michelle Snyder; Malaika Underwood; Kelsie Whitmore	Canada: Melissa Armstrong; Amanda Asay; Jessica Bérubé; Veronika Boyd; Claire Eccles; Jenna Flannigan; Jennifer Gilroy; Rebecca Hartley; Kelsey Lalor; Nicole Luchanski; Daniella Matteucci; Autumn Mills; Heidi Northcott; Katherine Psota; Vanessa Riopel; Stéphanie Savoie; Ashley Stephenson; Bradi Wall	Venezuela: Migreily Angulo; Ofelia Arrieche; Sor Brito; Dayvis Cazorla; Giddelys Cumana; Ingrid Escobar; Osmari Garcia; Daily Gimenez; Lelis Gomez; Oriannys Hernandez; Kerlys Pérez; Marianne Pérez; Esquia Rengel; Leonela Reyes; Maria Rincon; Astrid Rodriguez; Patricia Segovia; Maigleth Torres

== Qualification ==
A total of seven men's teams and five women's team qualified to compete at the games. For the men's tournament, the host nation Canada along with the United States (for its contributions to the game) qualified automatically. The top four teams at the 2014 Central American and Caribbean Games also qualified. The last qualifier saw one team qualify from the 2015 South American Championships. For the women's tournament, Canada as host nation qualified automatically, along with the top four nations at the qualification event held in March 2015. Men's rosters can have a maximum of 24 athletes, while women's rosters can have a maximum of 18 athletes.

=== Men ===
Event	Date	Location	Vacancies	Qualified
Host Nation	—N/a	—N/a	1	Canada
Qualified automatically	—N/a	—N/a	1	United States
2014 Central American and Caribbean Games	November 15–21	(Mexico) Veracruz	4	Cuba; Nicaragua; Dominican Republic; Puerto Rico
2015 South American Championships	February 28 – March 7	(Brazil) Cuiabá	1	Colombia
Total			7	

=== Women ===
Event	Date	Location	Vacancies	Qualified
Host Nation	—N/a	—N/a	1	Canada
2015 Pan American Women's Baseball Championships	March 8–15	(Dominican Republic) Concepción de la Vega	4	United States; Venezuela; Cuba; Puerto Rico
Total			5	

== Participating nations ==
A total of eight countries qualified baseball teams. The numbers in parentheses represents the number of participants qualified.

- Canada (42)
- Colombia (24)
- Cuba (42)
- Dominican Republic (24)
- Nicaragua (24)
- Puerto Rico (42)
- United States (42)
- Venezuela (18)
