= Freddy Álvarez =

Freddy Álvarez may refer to:

- Freddy Álvarez (baseball) (born 1989)
- Freddy Álvarez (footballer) (born 1995)
