= Cody Satterwhite =

American professional baseball pitcher (born 1987)

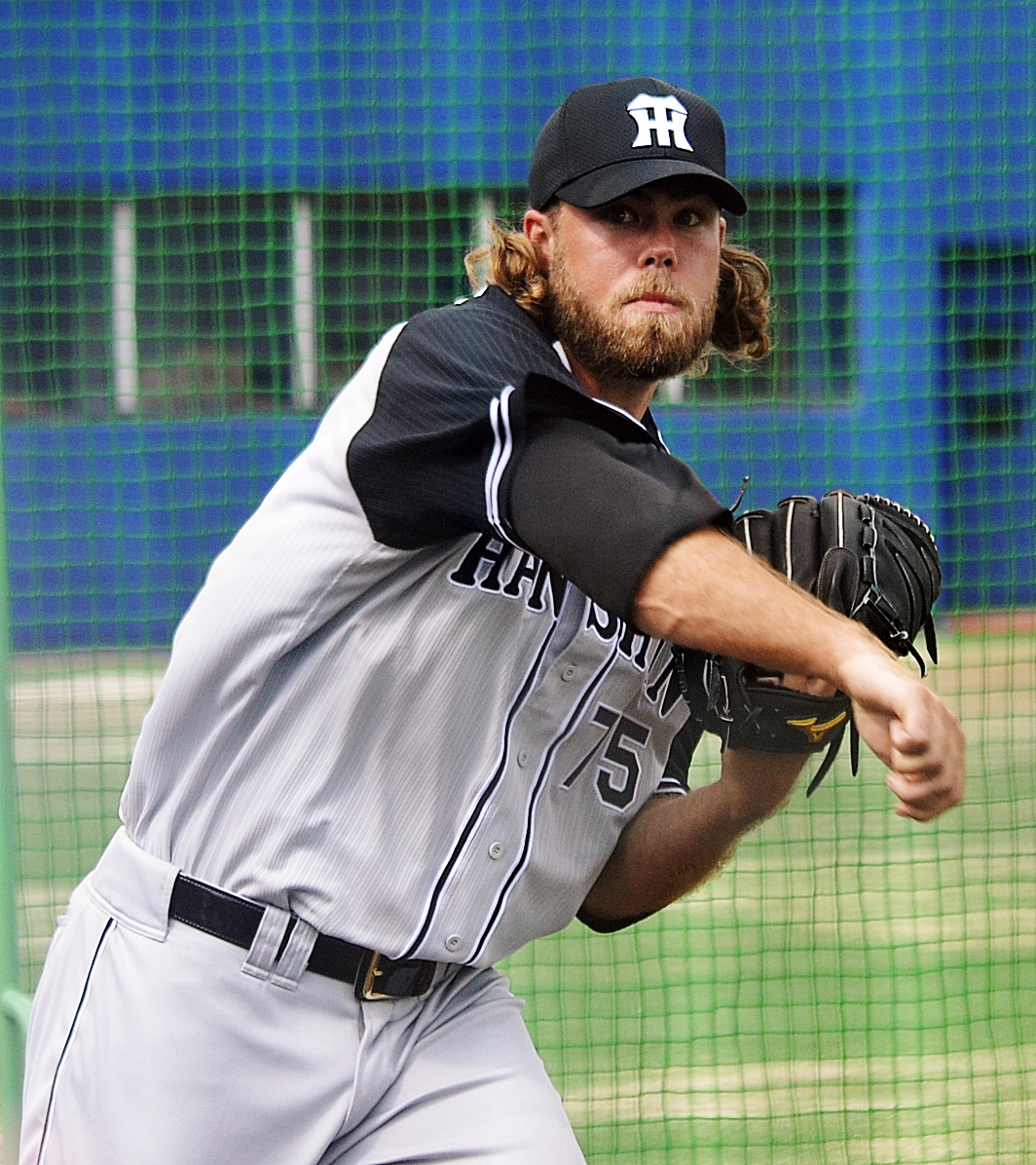
- Satterwhite with the Hanshin Tigers
- Pitcher
- Born: January 27, 1987 (age 39); Jackson, Mississippi, U.S.
- Batted: Right Threw: Right

NPB debut
- July 31, 2016, for the Hanshin Tigers

Last NPB appearance
- September 27, 2016, for the Hanshin Tigers

NPB statistics
- Win–loss record: 1–1
- Earned run average: 2.57
- Strikeouts: 18
- Stats at Baseball Reference

Teams
- Hanshin Tigers (2016)
Medals
Men's baseball
Representing United States
Pan American Games
Silver medal – second place	2007 Rio de Janeiro	Team

Cody Allen Satterwhite (born January 27, 1987) is an American former professional baseball pitcher. He played in Nippon Professional Baseball (NPB) for the Hanshin Tigers.

== Career ==
=== Detroit Tigers ===
Satterwhite attended Hillcrest Christian High School in Jackson, Mississippi, and the University of Mississippi. The Detroit Tigers selected Satterwhite in the second round of the 2008 MLB draft. The Tigers promoted him to the Erie SeaWolves of the Class AA Eastern League in 2009. He required surgery on his labrum in 2010 and surgery to repair scar tissue in 2012.

The Tigers released Satterwhite in February 2012.

=== Sioux City Explorers ===
In 2013, Satterwhite signed with the Sioux City Explorers of the American Association of Independent Professional Baseball.

=== New York Mets ===
The New York Mets signed Satterwhite out of Sioux City in 2013. He pitched for the Binghamton Mets of the Eastern League in 2014, and was named an All-Star.

=== Los Angeles Angels ===
Satterwhite signed a minor league contract with the Los Angeles Angels for the 2016 season, and played for the Salt Lake Bees.

=== Hanshin Tigers ===
He signed with the Hanshin Tigers of Nippon Professional Baseball's Central League during the 2016 season.

=== Baltimore Orioles ===
On January 9, 2017, Satterwhite signed a minor league contract with the Baltimore Orioles organization. He was released by the team following spring training on April 1.

=== Washington Nationals ===
On April 20, 2017, Satterwhite signed a minor league contract with the Washington Nationals. He made 24 appearances for the Triple–A Syracuse Chiefs, logging a 4.35 ERA with 43 strikeouts across 49 2/3 innings pitched. Satterwhite elected free agency following the season on November 6.

On January 20, 2018, Satterwhite re–signed with the Nationals on a new minor league contract. He made only three appearances for Syracuse before being released by the organization on May 31.

=== Diablos Rojos del México ===
On July 2, 2018, Satterwhite signed with the Diablos Rojos del México of the Mexican League. He was released on July 23, 2018.

== See also ==
- List of Pan American Games medalists in baseball
