= Baseball at the 2015 Pan American Games – Women's tournament =

Baseball – Women's tournament at the 2015 Pan American Games
- Venue: President's Choice Ajax Pan Am Ballpark
- Dates: July 20–26, 2015
- Competitors: 90 from 5 nations

Medalists
Gold medal	United States
Silver medal	Canada
Bronze medal	Venezuela

The women's baseball tournament at the 2015 Pan American Games in Toronto, Canada, was held at the President's Choice Ajax Pan Am Ballpark in Ajax, from July 20 to 26. Women's baseball was making its Pan American Games debut, after being added to the program at the 2013 Pan American Sports Organization's general assembly. All women's matches happened on the main field.

For these Games, the women competed in a 5-team tournament. The teams were grouped into one single pool and all teams played each other in a round-robin preliminary round. The top two teams after the round robin played for gold, and teams ranked third and fourth contested the bronze-medal match.

== Qualification ==
A total of five women's team qualified to compete at the games. Canada as host nation qualified automatically, along with the top four nations at the qualification event held in March 2015. Women's rosters can have a maximum of 18 athletes.

=== Summary ===
Event	Date	Location	Vacancies	Qualified
Host Nation	—N/a	—N/a	1	Canada
2015 Pan American Women's Baseball Championships	March 8–15	(Dominican Republic) Concepción de la Vega	4	United States; Venezuela; Cuba; Puerto Rico
Total			5	

== Medalists ==
Event	Gold	Silver	Bronze
Women's tournament	United States: Veronica Alvarez; Ryleigh Buck; Samantha Cobb; Alex Fulmer; Veronica Gajownik; Brittany Gomez; Jade Gortarez; Tamara Holmes; Sarah Hudek; Anna Kimbrell; Jenna Marston; Stacy Piagno; Nicole Rivera; Cydnee Sanders; Marti Sementelli; Michelle Snyder; Malaika Underwood; Kelsie Whitmore	Canada: Melissa Armstrong; Amanda Asay; Jessica Bérubé; Veronika Boyd; Claire Eccles; Jenna Flannigan; Jennifer Gilroy; Rebecca Hartley; Kelsey Lalor; Nicole Luchanski; Daniella Matteucci; Autumn Mills; Heidi Northcott; Katherine Psota; Vanessa Riopel; Stéphanie Savoie; Ashley Stephenson; Bradi Wall	Venezuela: Migreily Ángulo; Ofelia Arrieche; Sor Brito; Dayvis Cazorla; Giddelys Cumana; Ingrid Escobar; Osmari Garcia; Daily Gimenez; Lelis Gomez; Oriannys Hernandez; Kerlys Pérez; Marianne Pérez; Esquia Rengel; Leonela Reyes; Maria Rincon; Astrid Rodriguez; Patricia Segovia; Maigleth Torres

== Rosters ==
At the start of tournament, all five participating countries had up to 18 players on their rosters.

- Canada
- Cuba
- Puerto Rico
- United States
- Venezuela

== Results ==
The official detailed schedule was revealed on April 20, 2015.

All times are Eastern Daylight Time (UTC−4)

=== Preliminary round ===
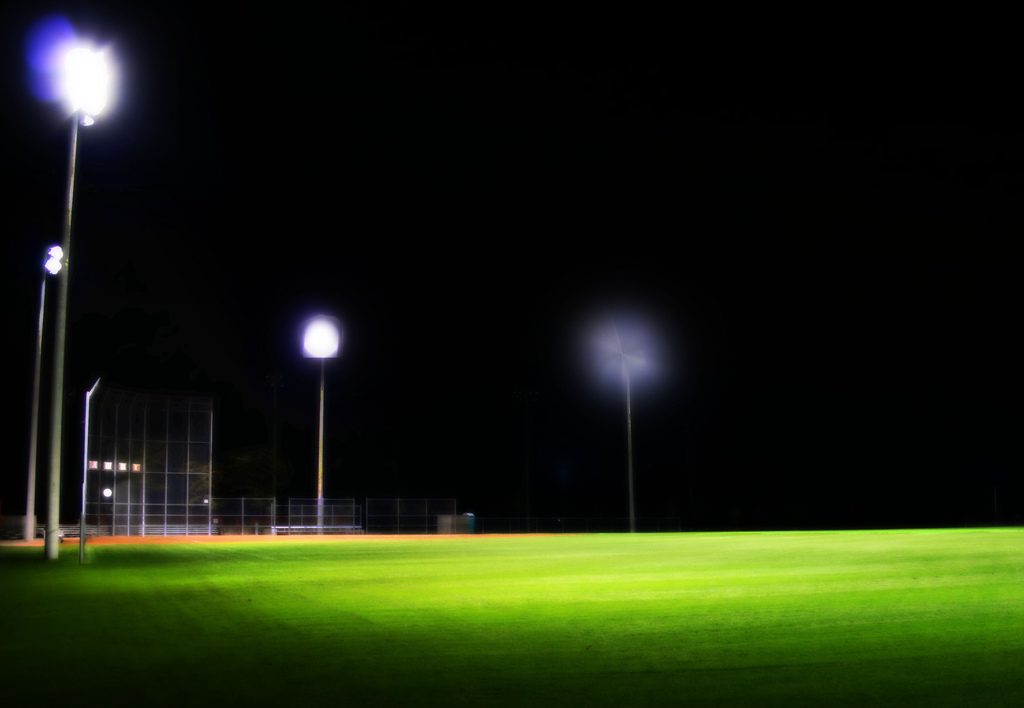
The Pan Am Ball Park in Ajax, was the venue for the women's baseball competition

Pos	Team	Pld	W	L	RF	RA	RD	PCT	GB	Qualification
1	United States	4	4	0	33	7	+26	1.000	—	Advanced to the Gold medal match
2	Canada	4	3	1	26	9	+17	.750	1	Advance to the Bronze medal match
3	Venezuela	4	2	2	32	30	+2	.500	2	Advance to the Bronze medal match
4	Puerto Rico	4	1	3	17	27	−10	.250	3	
5	Cuba	4	0	4	8	43	−35	.000	4	

20 July 2015; 15:00	United States	10–6	Venezuela	President’s Choice Ajax Pan Am Ballpark, Ajax; Attendance: 847
20 July 2015; 15:00		Boxscore		President’s Choice Ajax Pan Am Ballpark, Ajax; Attendance: 847

20 July 2015; 19:00	Cuba	1–13	Canada	President’s Choice Ajax Pan Am Ballpark, Ajax; Attendance: 1,602
20 July 2015; 19:00		Boxscore		President’s Choice Ajax Pan Am Ballpark, Ajax; Attendance: 1,602

21 July 2015; 15:00	Cuba	5–6	Puerto Rico	President’s Choice Ajax Pan Am Ballpark, Ajax; Attendance: 975
21 July 2015; 15:00		Boxscore		President’s Choice Ajax Pan Am Ballpark, Ajax; Attendance: 975

21 July 2015; 19:00	Venezuela	3–9	Canada	President’s Choice Ajax Pan Am Ballpark, Ajax; Attendance: 1,375
21 July 2015; 19:00		Boxscore		President’s Choice Ajax Pan Am Ballpark, Ajax; Attendance: 1,375

22 July 2015; 15:00	Canada	3–2	Puerto Rico	President’s Choice Ajax Pan Am Ballpark, Ajax; Attendance: 1,775
22 July 2015; 15:00		Boxscore		President’s Choice Ajax Pan Am Ballpark, Ajax; Attendance: 1,775

22 July 2015; 19:00	United States	11–0	Cuba	President’s Choice Ajax Pan Am Ballpark, Ajax; Attendance: 773
22 July 2015; 19:00		Boxscore		President’s Choice Ajax Pan Am Ballpark, Ajax; Attendance: 773

23 July 2015; 15:00	Cuba	2–13	Venezuela	President’s Choice Ajax Pan Am Ballpark, Ajax; Attendance: 977
23 July 2015; 15:00		Boxscore		President’s Choice Ajax Pan Am Ballpark, Ajax; Attendance: 977

23 July 2015; 19:00	Puerto Rico	0–9	United States	President’s Choice Ajax Pan Am Ballpark, Ajax; Attendance: 547
23 July 2015; 19:00		Boxscore		President’s Choice Ajax Pan Am Ballpark, Ajax; Attendance: 547

24 July 2015; 15:00	Venezuela	10–9	Puerto Rico	President’s Choice Ajax Pan Am Ballpark, Ajax; Attendance: 1,803
24 July 2015; 15:00		Boxscore		President’s Choice Ajax Pan Am Ballpark, Ajax; Attendance: 1,803

24 July 2015; 19:00	Canada	1–3	United States	President’s Choice Ajax Pan Am Ballpark, Ajax; Attendance: 3,469
24 July 2015; 19:00		Boxscore		President’s Choice Ajax Pan Am Ballpark, Ajax; Attendance: 3,469

=== Medal round ===
Bronze medal			Gold medal
			1	Canada	3
2	Venezuela	1		United States	11
3	Canada	6

==== Bronze medal match ====
25 July 2015; 19:00	(bronze) Venezuela	1–6	Canada	President’s Choice Ajax Pan Am Ballpark, Ajax; Attendance: 2,847
25 July 2015; 19:00		Boxscore		President’s Choice Ajax Pan Am Ballpark, Ajax; Attendance: 2,847

==== Gold medal match ====
26 July 2015; 12:00	(silver) Canada	3–11	United States (gold)	President’s Choice Ajax Pan Am Ballpark, Ajax; Attendance: 5,224
26 July 2015; 12:00		Boxscore		President’s Choice Ajax Pan Am Ballpark, Ajax; Attendance: 5,224

== Final standings ==
Rank	Team	Record
Gold medal	United States	5–0
Silver medal	Canada	4–2
Bronze medal	Venezuela	2–3
4	Puerto Rico	1–3
5	Cuba	0–4
