= Yordan Manduley =

Cuban baseball player (born 1986)

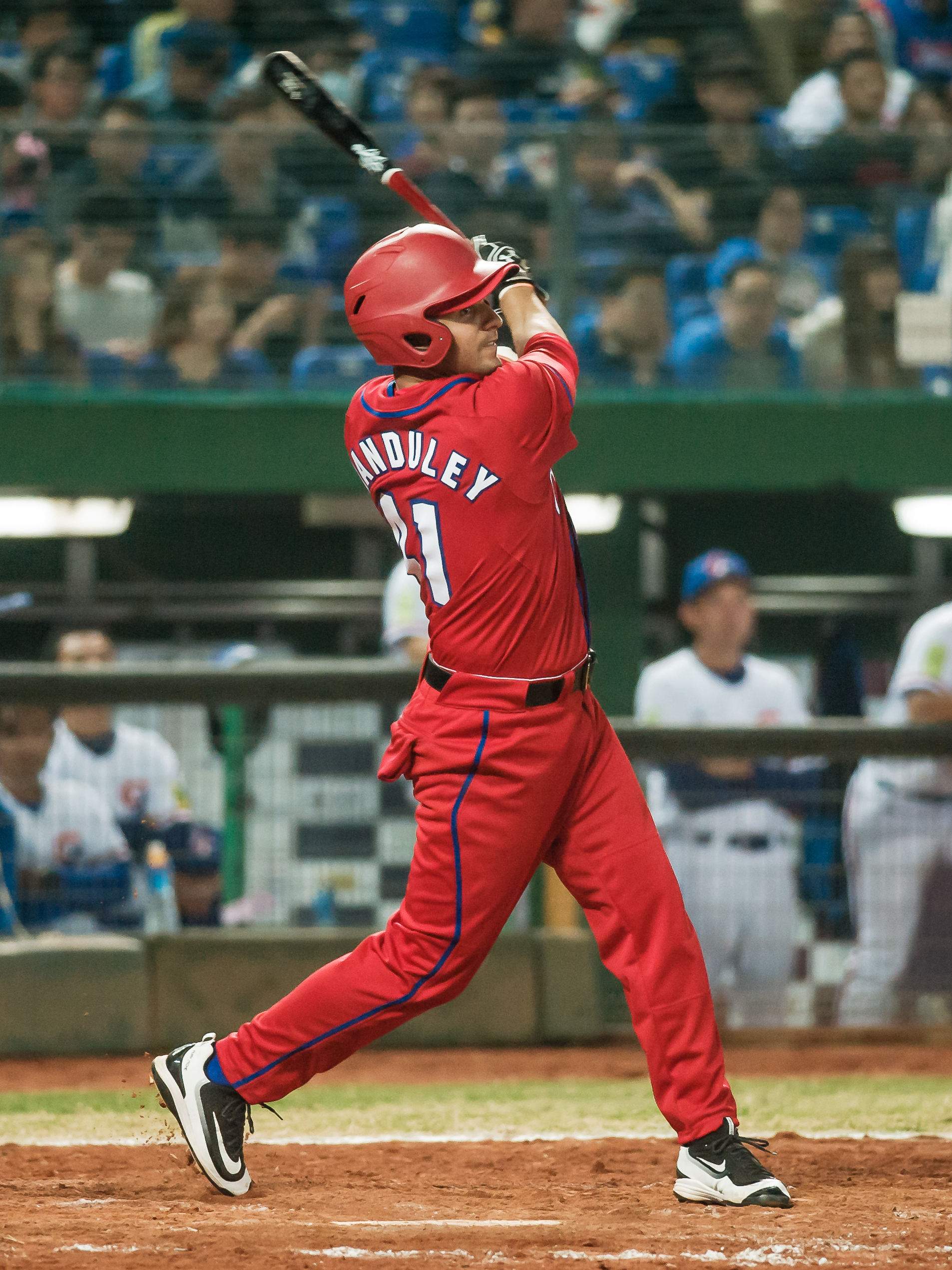
- Manduley in 2017

Toronto Maple Leafs – No. 21
- Shortstop
- Born: February 9, 1986 (age 40); Calixto García, Holguín, Cuba
- Bats: Right Throws: Right
- Stats at Baseball Reference
Medals
Men's baseball
Representing Cuba
Central American and Caribbean Games
Silver medal – second place	2018 Barranquilla	Team
Silver medal – second place	2023 San Salvador	Team

Yordan Manduley Escalona (born March 30, 1986) is a Cuban professional baseball shortstop for the Toronto Maple Leafs of the Canadian Baseball League.

== Career ==
=== Québec Capitales ===
Manduley began his professional career with the Québec Capitales of the Can-Am League in 2015. From 2015 to 2019, Manduley hit .313 with 362 hits and seven home runs over 1,158 at-bats for the Capitales.

Manduley did not play in 2020 due to the cancellation of the Frontier League season because of the COVID-19 pandemic, and also did not play in 2021.

On June 26, 2022, Manduley re-signed with the Capitales. He made 50 appearances for Québec over the course of the season, slashing .251/.305/.331 with three home runs, 21 RBI, and 15 stolen bases. On December 5, Manduley was released by the Capitales by having his contract option declined.

=== Kitchener Panthers ===
On May 17, 2025, Manduley signed with the Kitchener Panthers of the Intercounty Baseball League. In 33 appearances for Kitchener, he hit .328 with four home runs, 18 RBI, and 11 stolen bases. Manduley was released by the Panthers on July 28.

=== Toronto Maple Leafs ===
On January 27, 2026, Manduley signed with the Toronto Maple Leafs of the Canadian Baseball League.

== International career ==
Manduley played for the Cuban national baseball team at the 2014 Central American and Caribbean Games, 2015 Pan American Games, 2015 Premier 12, 2017 World Baseball Classic, and 2019 Pan American Games.
