= William Saavedra =

Cuban baseball player

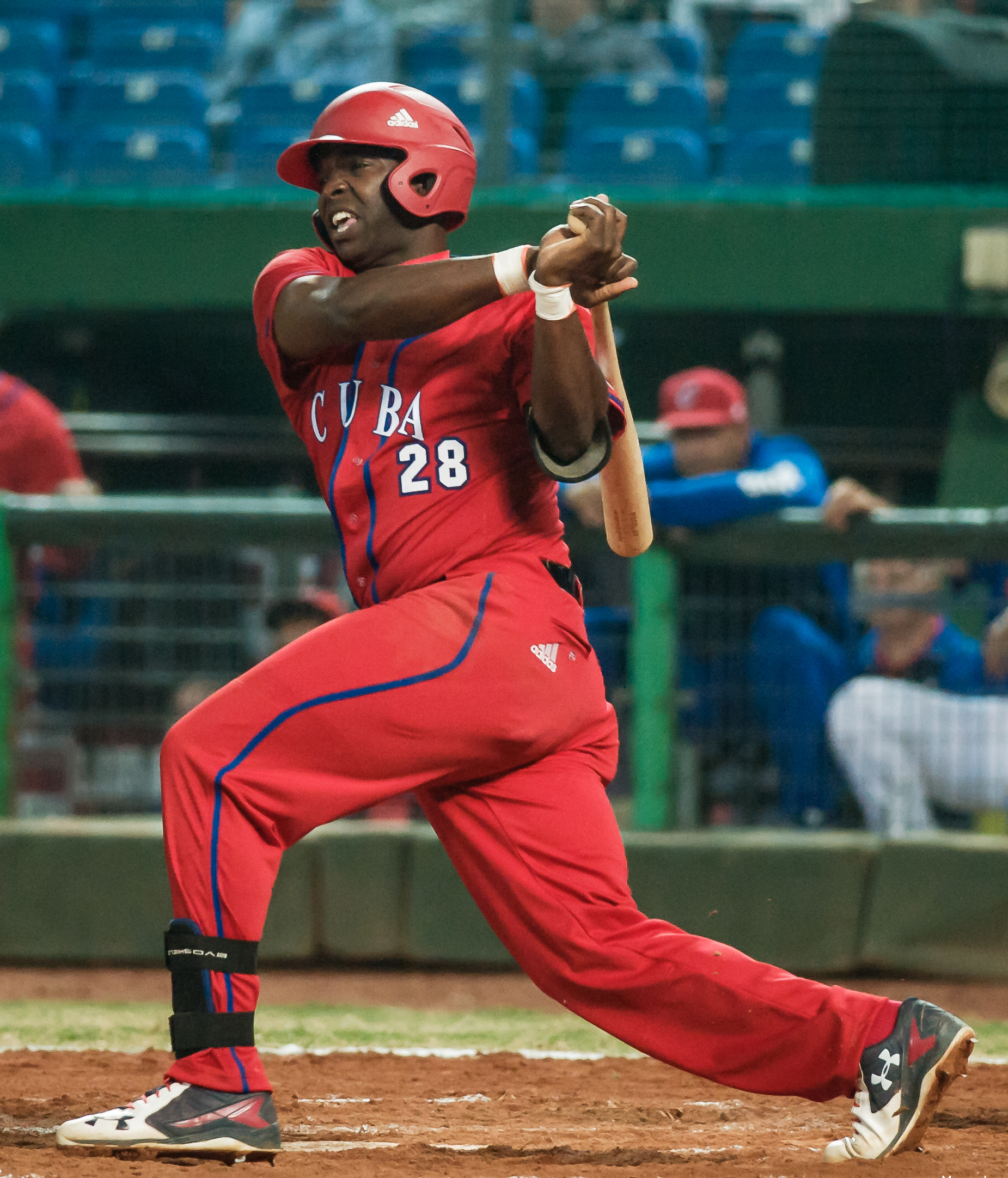
- Saavedra in 2017

Vegueros de Pinar del Río
- First baseman
- Born: October 23, 1981 (age 44); Pinar del Rio, Cuba
- Bats: Right Throws: Right
- Stats at Baseball Reference

William Saavedra Valdés (born October 23, 1981) is a Cuban professional baseball first baseman for Vegueros de Pinar del Río in the Cuban National Series.

Saavedra played for the Cuban national baseball team at the 2011 World Port Tournament, 2015 Pan American Games and 2017 World Baseball Classic.
