= Sean Jamieson =

Canadian baseball player (born 1989)

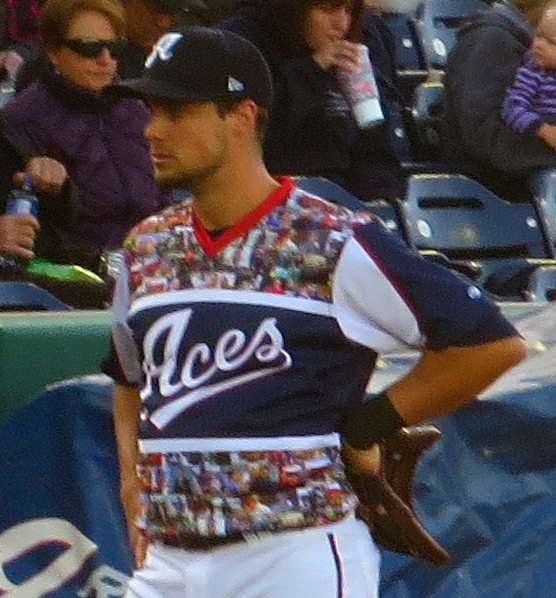
- Jamieson with the Reno Aces in 2016
- Infielder
- Born: March 2, 1989 (age 36); Kitchener, Ontario, Canada
- Bats: Right Throws: Right
Medals
Men's baseball
Representing Canada
Pan American Games
Gold medal – first place	2015 Toronto	Team

Sean Robert Jamieson (born March 2, 1989) is a Canadian former professional baseball infielder.

== Amateur career ==
Jamieson attended Holy Trinity Catholic Secondary School in Simcoe, Ontario and then Niagara County Community College where he maintained a 3.98 grade point average and won a NJCAA Division III Gold Glove award in 2009. After two years at NCCC, Jamieson accepted a full scholarship offer to play at Canisius over competing offers from South Florida and Pittsburgh. Jamieson was named the Metro Atlantic Athletic Conference Co-Player of the Year as well as the MAAC Male Student-Athlete of the Year and was also selected for the Capital One Academic All-America Second-Team in 2011.

== Professional career ==
=== Oakland Athletics ===
The Oakland Athletics selected Jamieson in the 17th round (526th overall) of the 2011 Major League Baseball draft. He made his professional debut with the Low-A Vermont Lake Monsters, hitting .235 with three home runs, 21 RBI, and 27 stolen bases in 69 games. In 2012, Jamieson made 119 appearances for the Single-A Burlington Bees, batting .234/.345/.379 with 10 home runs, 49 RBI, and 25 stolen bases.

=== Arizona Diamondbacks ===
The Athletics traded Jamieson to the Arizona Diamondbacks in exchange for Stephen Drew on August 21, 2012. He played in 14 games down the stretch for the Single-A South Bend Silver Hawks, hitting .327/.431/.473 with one home run, seven RBI, and five stolen bases.

During the 2013 campaign, Jamieson made 122 appearances for the High-A Visalia Rawhide, slashing .287/.370/.462 with 11 home runs, 53 RBI, and 11 stolen bases.

Jamieson spent the 2014 season with the Double-A Mobile BayBears, playing in 91 games and batting .298/.362/.429 with five home runs, 33 RBI, and six stolen bases. He returned to Mobile in 2015, slashing .272/.376/.381 with six home runs, 14 RBI, and 10 stolen bases across 92 appearances.

Jamieson played for the Canadian national baseball team in the 2015 Pan American Games and 2015 WBSC Premier12. He made 77 appearances for the Triple-A Reno Aces in 2016, hitting .244/.311/.326 with one home run and 18 RBI.

Jamieson retired from baseball on June 13, 2017, having not played during the regular season due to an injury.
