= Kyle Lotzkar =

Canadian baseball player (born 1989)

- Pitcher
- Born: October 24, 1989 (age 37); Tsawwassen, British Columbia, Canada
- Bats: Left Throws: Right
- Stats at Baseball Reference
Medals
Men's baseball
Representing Canada
Baseball World Cup
Bronze medal – third place	2011 Panama City	Team
Pan American Games
Gold medal – first place	2011 Guadalajara	Team
Gold medal – first place	2015 Toronto	Team

Kyle S. Lotzkar (born October 24, 1989) is a Canadian former professional baseball pitcher. Lotzkar also competed for the Canadian national baseball team.

== Career ==
=== Amateur career ===
Lotzkar attended South Delta Secondary School in Delta, British Columbia. He played youth baseball for the Langley Blaze of the British Columbia Premier Baseball League.

=== Professional career ===
The Cincinnati Reds selected Lotzkar in the supplemental first round, with the 53rd overall selection, of the 2007 Major League Baseball draft. The Reds signed Lotzkar to a contract with a $600,000 signing bonus. He made his professional debut with the Gulf Coast League Reds of the Rookie-level Gulf Coast League and Billings Mustangs of the Rookie-level Pioneer League in 2007. In 2008, he pitched for the Dayton Dragons of the Class-A Midwest League in 2008. He fractured his elbow in 2008. As a result, Lotzkar had Tommy John surgery. He missed the 2009 season, and only appeared in twelve games in 2010 for Cincinnati's Rookie-level affiliates. He pitched for Dayton in 2011, rated as the 10th best prospect in the Reds' organization by Baseball America. Lotzkar was added to the Reds' 40 man roster after the 2011 season to protect him from the Rule 5 draft.

Prior to the 2012 season, Baseball America rated Lotzkar the 30th best prospect in the Reds' organization. He was named to appear in the 2012 All-Star Futures Game.

Lotzkar was designated for assignment by the Reds on September 16, 2013. He was released on September 24, 2013. In October 23, Lotzkar signed with the Texas Rangers. The Rangers released him in June 2015.

=== International career ===
Lotzkar played for the Canadian national baseball team. In 2011, he participated in the 2011 Baseball World Cup, winning the bronze medal, and the Pan American Games, winning the gold medal. He also competed for the Canadian Junior National Team in 2007 and was on Canada's provisional roster for the 2009 World Baseball Classic, but did not make the final roster.

== Pitching style ==
Lotzkar throws four-seam and two-seam fastballs (92–95 mph), a slider, and a changeup. In the minors, he has had high walk (4.2) and strikeout (10.6) rates.
