= Scott McGregor (right-handed pitcher) =

American baseball player (born 1986)

- Pitcher
- Born: December 19, 1986 (age 39); Cincinnati, Ohio, U.S.
- Bats: Right Throws: Right

Professional debut
- KBO: June 26, 2016, for the Nexen Heroes
- CPBL: July 2, 2017, for the Fubon Guardians

KBO statistics
- Win–loss record: 6–3
- Earned run average: 5.20
- Strikeouts: 61

CPBL statistics
- Win–loss record: 1–2
- Earned run average: 4.88
- Strikeouts: 11
- Stats at Baseball Reference

Teams
- Nexen Heroes (2016); Fubon Guardians (2017)
Medals
Men's baseball
Representing United States
Pan American Games
Silver medal – second place	2015 Toronto	Team

Scott Robert McGregor (born December 19, 1986) is an American former professional baseball starting pitcher. He played in the KBO League for the Nexen Heroes, and in the Chinese Professional Baseball League (CPBL) for the Fubon Guardians.

== Career ==
He was born in Cincinnati and attended Lakota East High School in Liberty Township, Ohio. He went to the University of Memphis following high school, where he posted a won-loss record of 13–15 in three years there.

=== St. Louis Cardinals ===
McGregor was taken in the 15th round of the 2008 MLB draft, a couple picks after outfielder Joey Butler, by the St. Louis Cardinals. He was 4–0 with a 1.45 ERA and five walks allowed in 37.1 innings his first professional season and followed that with a 7–11 record and a 5.56 ERA in 34 games (17 starts) for the Quad Cities River Bandits in 2009. In 115 innings, he allowed 26 walks and had the eighth-best BB/9 IP ratio in the Midwest League among pitchers with 100 or more innings pitched. In 2010, he was 10-8 with a 3.14 ERA in 31 games (20 starts) split between two teams; in 137.2 innings, he allowed 22 walks. Baseball America ranked him as having the best control in the Cardinals system. After missing 2011 to Tommy John surgery, McGregor returned in 2012 to go 5–2 with a 6.31 ERA in 14 games (13 starts). He reached Triple-A for the first time in 2013, going 6–10 with a 4.83 ERA in 18 games (17 starts) for the Memphis Redbirds; He also pitched for the Springfield Cardinals that year and went 10–11 with a 4.06 ERA as a whole. He began 2014 with Memphis, but was released in June.

=== Washington Nationals ===
The Washington Nationals subsequently signed McGregor and he played for their Double-A affiliate, the Harrisburg Senators, and their Triple-A affiliate, the Syracuse Chiefs. Between the three affiliates, McGregor was 4–9 with a 5.56 ERA. In 2015, he was 6–6 with a 4.04 ERA in 27 games (15 starts) for Syracuse. McGregor was released on March 16, 2016.

=== Somerset Patriots ===
On April 11, 2016, McGregor signed with the Somerset Patriots of the Atlantic League of Professional Baseball. In nine appearances for Somerset, McGregor posted a 4-4 record and 3.36 ERA with 31 strikeouts over 59 innings of work.

=== Nexen Heroes ===
On June 16, 2016, McGregor signed with the Nexen Heroes of the KBO League, following Robert Coello's release. In 14 starts for Nexen, McGregor compiled a 6-3 record and 5.20 ERA with 61 strikeouts over 90 innings of work.

=== Fubon Guardians ===
In May 2017, McGregor signed with the Fubon Guardians of the Chinese Professional Baseball League. After sustaining a leg injury in June and pitching to a 4.88 ERA in 24 innings of work, he was released on August 5, 2017.

== International career ==
He played for the United States national baseball team in the 2015 Pan American Games.
