= Jordan Lennerton =

Canadian baseball player (born 1986)

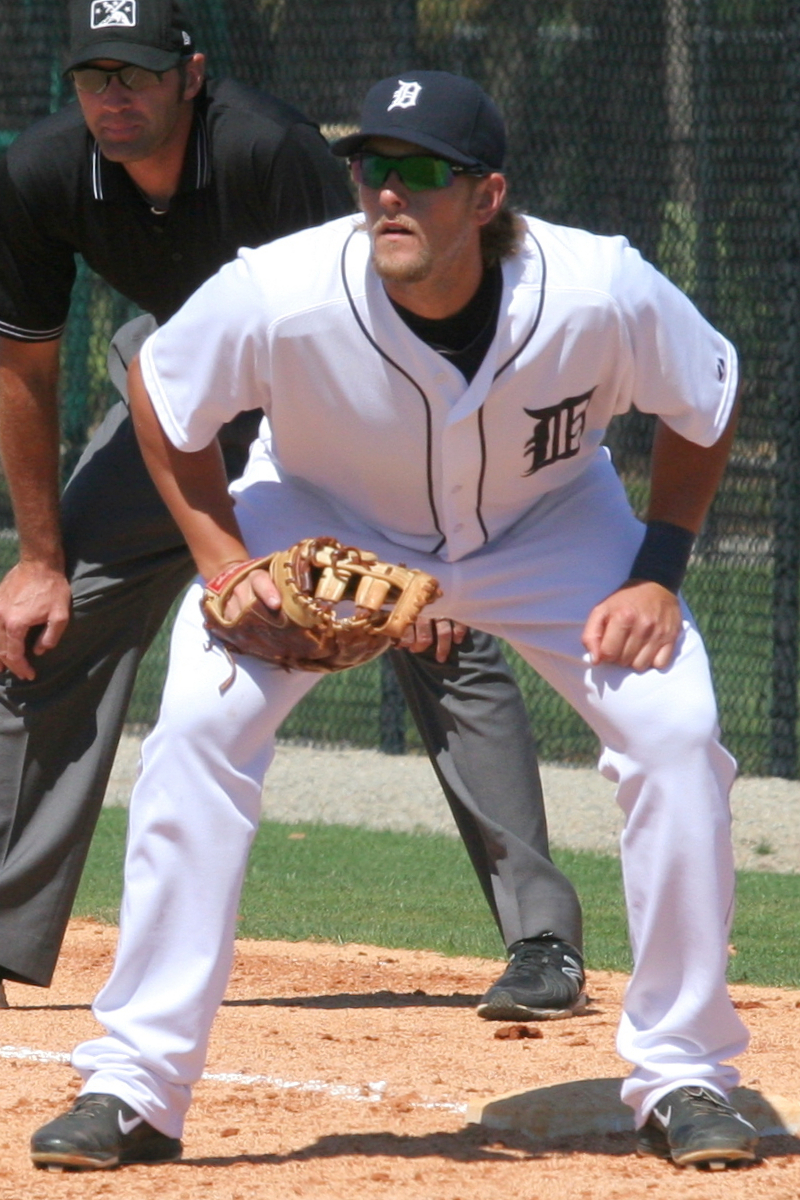
- Lennerton with the Detroit Tigers organization in 2014 spring training
- First baseman
- Born: February 16, 1986 (age 40); Langley, British Columbia, Canada
- Bats: Left Throws: Left
- Stats at Baseball Reference
Medals
Men's baseball
Representing Canada
Pan American Games
| Gold medal – first place | 2015 Toronto | Team |
| Silver medal – second place | 2019 Lima | Team |

Jordan M. Lennerton (born February 16, 1986) is a Canadian former professional baseball first baseman. He had been in the Detroit Tigers' organization from the time he was drafted in 2008 until 2015.

== Amateur career ==
Lennerton grew up in Langley, British Columbia, where he played Little League Baseball. His team reached the 1998 Little League World Series. Lennerton hit a home run in a game against a team from Japan. He attended Brookswood Secondary School and also played amateur baseball for the Langley Blaze of the British Columbia Premier Baseball League.

Lennerton attended El Paso Community College. He then transferred to Oregon State University, where he played for the Oregon State Beavers baseball team. He hit three home runs in the 2007 College World Series, which Oregon State won. In 2008, he was named to the All-Pacific-10 Conference team.

== Professional career ==
=== Detroit Tigers ===
The Detroit Tigers drafted Lennerton in the 33rd round of the 2008 Major League Baseball draft. In 2012, while playing for the Erie SeaWolves, he was named to the Eastern League all-star game as well as being named Detroit Tigers organizational all star. Named top defensive first baseman in the Eastern League by Baseball America in 2012.

In 2013, Lennerton was assigned to the Toledo Mud Hens of the Triple–A International League. He represented the Tigers in the All-Star Futures Game. He was also named an International League All-Star.

On November 20, 2013, the Tigers added Lennerton to their 40-man roster to protect him from the Rule 5 draft. On May 5, 2014, Lennerton was removed from the 40–man roster and sent outright to Toledo after clearing waivers. During the 2014 season, Lennerton batted .249 (102-for-410) with 26 doubles, 10 home runs, 53 RBI, 73 walks and 114 strikeouts with the Mud Hens. On January 5, 2015, Lennerton re–signed with the Tigers on a minor league contract. He was released on July 24, 2015.

=== Atlanta Braves ===
Lennerton signed a minor league contract with the Atlanta Braves on July 27, 2015. In 33 games for the Triple–A Gwinnett Stripers, he batted .202/.280/.250 with one home run and 10 RBI. Lennerton was released by the Braves organization on March 21, 2016.

=== Québec Capitales ===
On April 10, 2016, Lennerton signed with the Québec Capitales of the Can-Am League. In 100 games for Québec, he hit .301/.390/.432 with nine home runs and 62 RBI. Lennerton was released by the team on April 6, 2017.

Lennerton re–signed with the Capitales on May 18, 2017. In 99 contests, he batted .328/.442/.507 with 14 home runs and 82 RBI. Lennerton was once more released on December 27.

== International career ==
Lennerton selected for the Canadian national baseball team in the 2013 World Baseball Classic Qualifier, 2013 World Baseball Classic, 2015 Pan American Games, 2015 WBSC Premier12, 2019 Pan American Games and 2019 WBSC Premier12.
