= Diamilette Quiles =

Puerto Rican baseball player

Montañeses de Utuado – No. 53
- First base
- Born: September 26, 1985 (age 41)
- Bats: Right Throws: Right

Béisbol Doble A debut
- May 19, 2019, for the Utuado Mountaineers

Diamilette Quiles Alicea (born September 26, 1985) is a Puerto Rican baseball player. She has represented the island in two Women's Baseball World Cups and was the first female to be signed to a team in the island's Doble A semi-pro league, playing first base for the Montañeses de Utuado ("Utuado Mountaineers" or "Highlanders") in the postseason.

Quiles had previously played for ten years in Puerto Rico's women's league, winning nine titles with the Arecibo Wolves, and led the league in the 2018–2019 season with a .611 batting average.
