= Jasvir Rakkar =

Canadian professional baseball pitcher (born 1991)

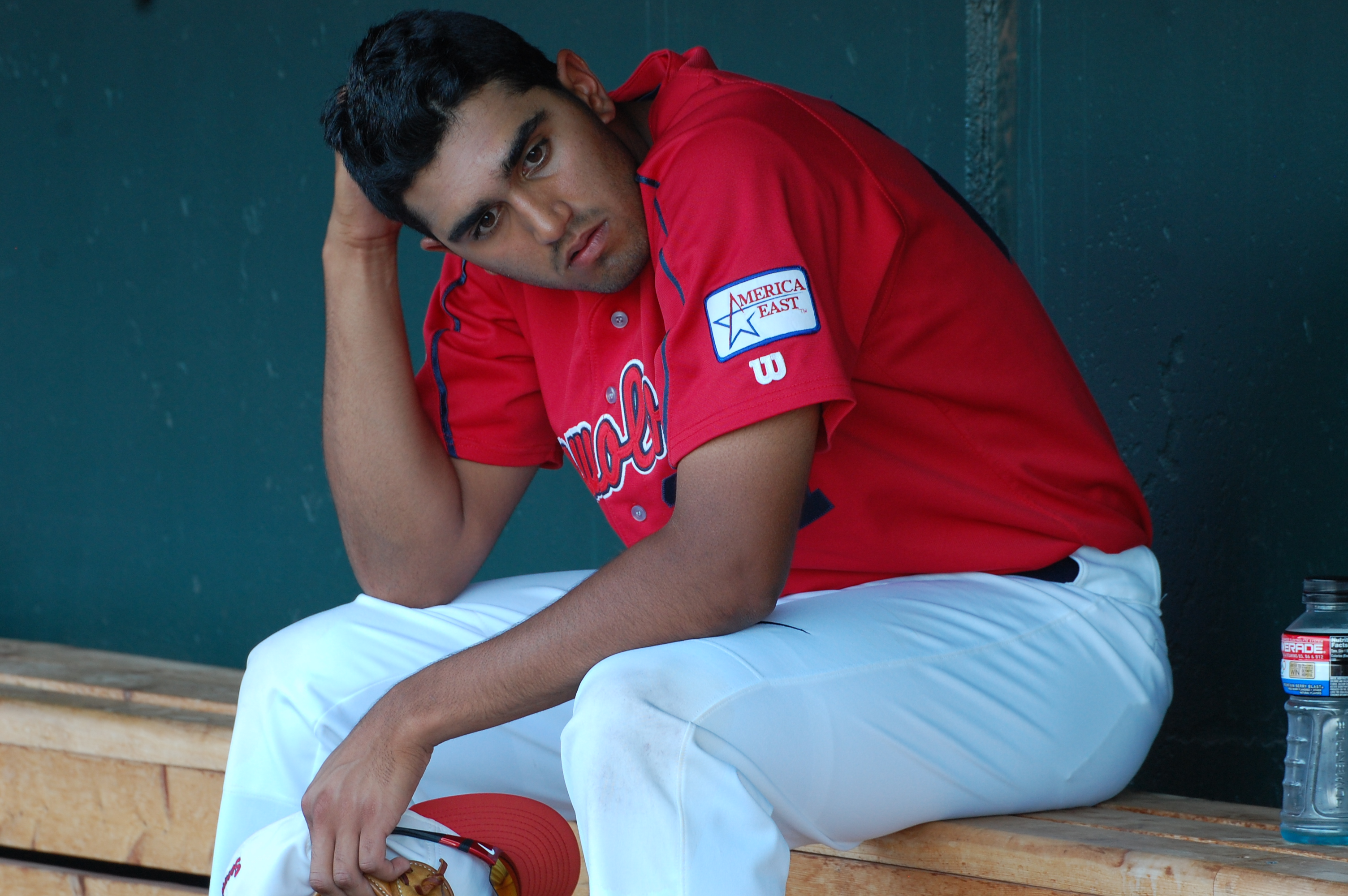
- Rakkar with Stony Brook in 2012
- Pitcher
- Born: April 27, 1991 (age 34); Brampton, Ontario, Canada
- Bats: Right Throws: Right
Medals
Men's baseball
Representing Canada
Pan American Games
Gold medal – first place	2015 Toronto	Team
Silver medal – second place	2019 Lima	Team

Jasvir Rakkar (born April 27, 1991) is a Canadian former professional baseball pitcher.

== Career ==
Rakkar's parents were born in Punjab, India, and immigrated to Canada before Jasvir was born. Rakkar graduated from Bramalea Secondary School in Brampton, Ontario, and enrolled at Stony Brook University to play college baseball for the Stony Brook Seawolves. The Chicago Cubs selected Rakkar in the 26th round of the 2012 Major League Baseball draft.

Rakkar signed with the Québec Capitales of the independent Canadian American Association of Professional Baseball in 2016.

== International career ==
He was selected to the Canada national baseball team at the 2015 Pan American Games, 2015 WBSC Premier12, 2019 Pan American Games Qualifier, 2019 Pan American Games and 2019 WBSC Premier12.
