= Jared Mortensen =

Canadian baseball player (born 1988)

- Pitcher / Coach
- Born: June 1, 1988 (age 37); Abbotsford, British Columbia, Canada
- Bats: Left Throws: Right
Medals
Men's baseball
Representing Canada
Pan American Games
Gold medal – first place	2015 Toronto	Team

Jared Paul Mortensen (born June 1, 1988) is a Canadian former professional baseball pitcher who currently serves as the pitching development coach for the White Rock Tritons of the British Columbia Premier Baseball League.

== Playing career ==
Mortensen played college baseball at Mount Olive College and the Louisiana State University in Shreveport.

=== Grand Prairie AirHogs ===
After going undrafted in the 2012 Major League Baseball draft, Mortensen signed with the Grand Prairie AirHogs of the American Association of Independent Professional Baseball for the 2013 season. In 17 games (15 starts) for the AirHogs, he registered a 4–6 record and 3.77 ERA with 94 strikeouts across 100 1/3 innings of work.

=== Tampa Bay Rays ===
On August 15, 2013, Mortensen signed a minor league contract with the Tampa Bay Rays organization. He finished the year with the High–A Charlotte Stone Crabs, logging a 1.04 ERA in 4 games. In 2014, Mortensen split the season between Charlotte and the Double–A Montgomery Biscuits, accumulating a 7–2 record and 4.73 ERA with 72 strikeouts across 85 2/3 innings pitched.

In 2015, Mortensen played for Montgomery and the Triple–A Durham Bulls, recording a combined 9–5 record and 3.68 ERA with 108 strikeouts in 26 appearances. The following year, he pitched exclusively for Montgomery, making 34 appearances and logging a 7–7 record and 5.23 ERA with 86 strikeouts.

=== Houston Astros ===
On December 7, 2016, Mortensen was selected by the Houston Astros in the minor league phase of the Rule 5 draft. He made only 3 appearances for the Triple–A Fresno Grizzlies, struggling to a 13.50 ERA with 4 strikeouts in 4 2/3 innings of work. On June 2, 2017, Mortensen was released by the Astros organization.

=== Texas AirHogs ===
On June 10, 2017, Mortensen signed with the Texas AirHogs of the American Association of Independent Professional Baseball. In 15 games (10 starts) for Kansas City, he posted an 8–1 record and 2.57 ERA with 64 strikeouts across 70.0 innings.

=== Kansas City T-Bones ===
On August 26, 2017, Mortensen and a player to be named later were traded to the Kansas City T-Bones in exchange for Cal Drummond. He made 2 starts for the club to finish the season, allowing 10 runs on 18 hits with 13 strikeouts.

On January 10, 2018, Mortensen and Kyle Petty were traded to the Sugar Land Skeeters of the Atlantic League of Professional Baseball in exchange for two players to be named later. He did not make an appearance for the club prior to his release on April 24.

=== Cleburne Railroaders ===
On May 2, 2018, Mortensen signed with the Cleburne Railroaders of the American Association of Independent Professional Baseball. He pitched in 17 contests (starting 16), and posted a 4–5 record and 4.01 ERA with 96 strikeouts across 110.0 innings of work.

=== Kansas City T-Bones (second stint) ===
On August 15, 2018, Mortensen was traded back to the Kansas City T-Bones as the player to be named later from a previous transaction. In 4 starts for Kansas City, he pitched to a 6.14 ERA with 26 strikeouts across 22.0 innings pitched.

=== Ottawa Champions ===
On March 27, 2019, Mortensen was traded to the Ottawa Champions of the Can-Am League in exchange for a player to be named later. In 20 games (18 starts) for Ottawa, he registered a 7–8 record and 3.96 ERA with 97 strikeouts across 109.0 innings pitched.

=== Équipe Québec ===
On March 24, 2020, Mortensen signed with the Welland Jackfish of the Intercounty Baseball League. However, he did not play in a game for the team after the season was cancelled as a result of the COVID-19 pandemic.

On August 22, 2021, Mortensen signed with the Équipe Québec of the independent Frontier League. In the regular season, he started 4 games, went 22 innings with a 5.72 ERA, a 1.36 WHIP and 22 strikeouts. In the postseason, he started 1 game and allowed no runs through 7 innings, threw 8 strikeouts, and allowed 2 walks and 2 hits. On December 13, Québec declined the option on Mortensen for the 2022 season and he became a free agent.

=== HCAW ===
On June 22, 2022, Mortensen signed with HCAW of the Honkbal Hoofdklasse.

Mortensen was named the South MVP in 2023, having posted an 11–0 record and 1.41 ERA with 90 strikeouts across 70 innings pitched.

== International career ==
In 2015, Mortensen was selected to play for the Canada national baseball team at the Pan American Games.

On January 9, 2019, Mortensen was selected at the 2019 Pan American Games Qualifier.

== Coaching career ==
On August 27, 2025, Mortensen was hired to serve as the pitching development coach for the White Rock Tritons of the British Columbia Premier Baseball League.
