= Frank Morejón =

Cuban baseball player (born 1986)

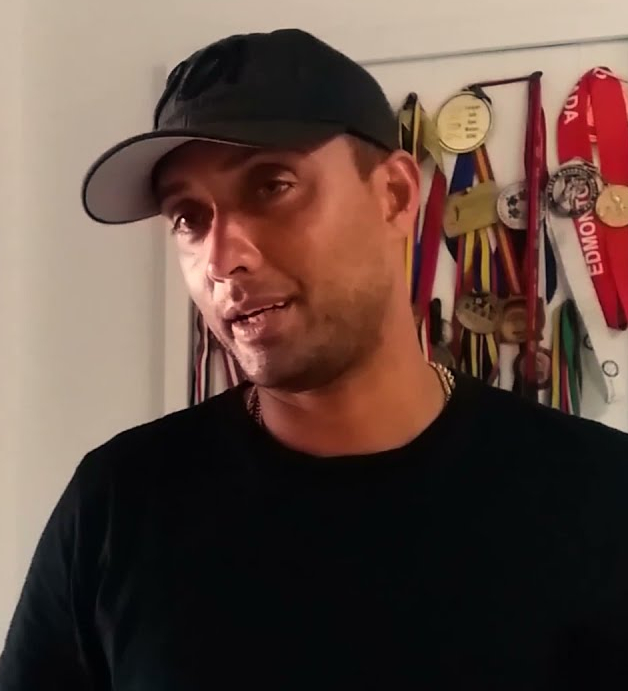
- Morejón in 2021
- Catcher
- Born: January 25, 1986 (age 40); Cerro, Havana, Cuba
- Bats: Right Throws: Right
- Stats at Baseball Reference
Medals
Men's baseball
Representing Cuba
Central American and Caribbean Games
Silver medal – second place	2018 Barranquilla	Team

Frank Camilo Morejón Reyes (born January 25, 1986) is a Cuban former professional baseball catcher. In Cuba, he played for the Industriales of the Cuban National Series.

== Career ==
In international play, Morejón played for the Cuba national baseball team in the 2010 World University Baseball Championship, 2011 Pan American Games, 2011 Baseball World Cup, 2012 Haarlem Baseball Week, 2013 World Baseball Classic, 2013 World Port Tournament, 2014 Central American and Caribbean Games, 2015 Pan American Games, 2015 Premier 12 and 2017 World Baseball Classics. Considered unlikely to defect, he received permission from the Cuban government to play for the Kitchener Panthers of the Intercounty Baseball League in 2016.

On March 8, 2018, Morejón signed with the Parmaclima Parma of the Italian Baseball League. In 21 appearances for the team, he batted .224/.274/.269 with 15 RBI.
