= Kellin Deglan =

Canadian baseball player (born 1992)

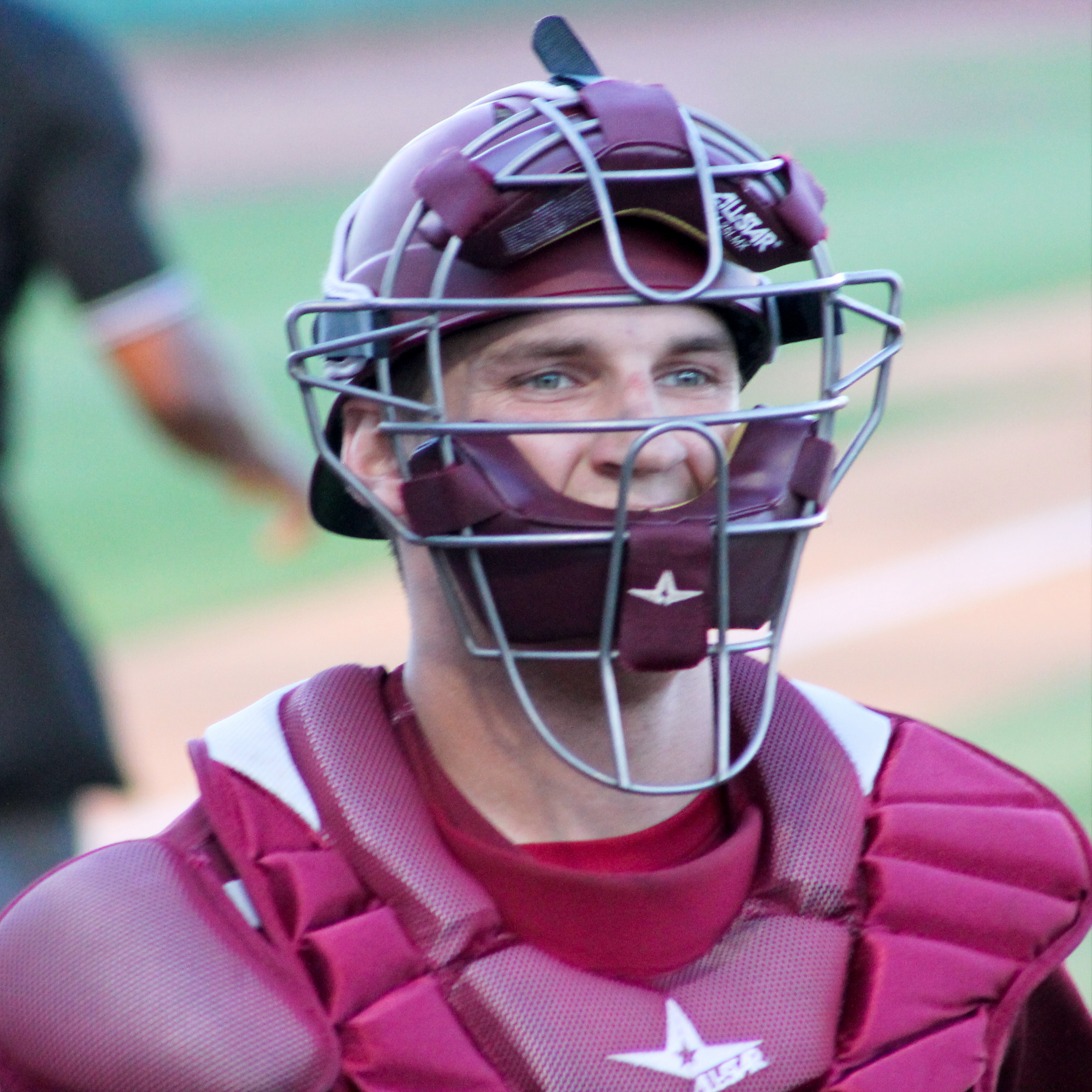
- Deglan with the Frisco RoughRiders in 2016
- Catcher
- Born: May 3, 1992 (age 33); Langley, British Columbia, Canada
- Bats: Left Throws: Right
- Stats at Baseball Reference
Medals
Men's baseball
Representing Canada
Pan American Games
Gold medal – first place	2015 Toronto	Team

Kellin Lee Deglan (born May 3, 1992) is a Canadian former professional baseball catcher. He was drafted out of R.E. Mountain Secondary School in the 2010 Major League Baseball draft by the Texas Rangers.

== Career ==
=== Texas Rangers ===
Despite not being able to play high school baseball, Deglan gained enough attention playing with the Langley Blaze of the wood-bat British Columbia Premier Baseball League (which had produced Justin Morneau and Brett Lawrie) and with the Canadian Junior National Team to be drafted 22nd overall by the Texas Rangers in the 2010 MLB draft. He signed for a below-slot bonus of $1 million. Baseball America viewed Deglan as a second or third round talent, praising his defense and power potential but seeing concerns about his overall offensive profile.

Deglan began his professional career in 2010 as an 18-year-old with the Arizona League Rangers in the rookie class Arizona League. He also appeared for the Low-A Spokane Indians, and hit .191 between the two teams. In 2011, he played for the Single-A Hickory Crawdads, slashing .227/.320/.347 in 89 games. He played 92 games for Hickory in 2012, batting .234/.310/.438 with career-highs in home runs (12) and RBI (41). He spent 2013 in High-A with the Myrtle Beach Pelicans, batting .231/.331/.393 in 89 games. The next year, he split the season between Hickory and Myrtle Beach, accumulating a .247/.314/.450 batting line with career-highs in home runs (16) and RBI (68). In 2015, he split the season between the High-A High Desert Mavericks and the Double-A Frisco RoughRiders, posting a batting line of .231/.284/.397 with 13 home runs and 42 RBI. Deglan spent the 2016 season with Frisco, hitting .194/.256/.332 in 83 games. He elected free agency following the season on November 7, 2016.

=== New York Yankees ===
On December 12, 2016, Deglan signed a minor league contract with the New York Yankees organization, however, he missed the entire 2017 season due to injury and became a free agent after the year. On March 24, 2018, Deglan re-signed with the Yankees on a new minor league contract. He split the season between the High-A Tampa Tarpons and the Double-A Trenton Thunder, batting .179/.258/.286 in 36 games. The Yankees invited Deglan to spring training as a non-roster player in 2019. He did not make the team and split the 2019 season between Trenton and the Triple-A Scranton/Wilkes-Barre RailRiders, posting a .257/.329/.426 batting line with 9 home runs and 32 RBI. Deglan elected free agency following the season on November 4, 2019.

Degland re-signed with the Yankees on a new minor league contract and received an invitation to spring training on February 3, 2020. Deglan did not play in a game in 2020 due to the cancellation of the minor league season because of the COVID-19 pandemic. On November 2, 2020, Deglan elected free agency.

On December 14, 2020, Deglan again re-signed with the Yankees on a minor league contract. He played in 12 games for Scranton in 2021, hitting .233/.281/.367 with one home run and three RBI.

=== Toronto Blue Jays ===
On August 3, 2021, Deglan was traded to the Toronto Blue Jays. In 27 games for the Triple–A Buffalo Bisons, he batted .203/.333/.354 with three home runs and 13 RBI.

On November 29, 2021, Deglan re–signed with Toronto on a minor league contract that included an invitation to spring training. He appeared in 25 games for Buffalo in 2022, slashing .111/.182/.148 with four RBI and two stolen bases. Deglan was released by the Blue Jays organization on August 5, 2022.

== International career ==
He was selected for the Canadian national baseball team at the 2013 World Baseball Classic Qualification, 2015 Pan American Games, 2015 WBSC Premier12, 2019 Pan American Games Qualifier and 2019 WBSC Premier12.

At the 2013 World Baseball Classic Qualification tournament, appearing in the September 22 game against Germany as a defensive replacement.

In 2015, Deglan was part of the Canadian Baseball team that won the gold medal in the 2015 Pan American Games while playing in Ajax.
