= Héctor Mendoza =

Cuban baseball player (born 1994)

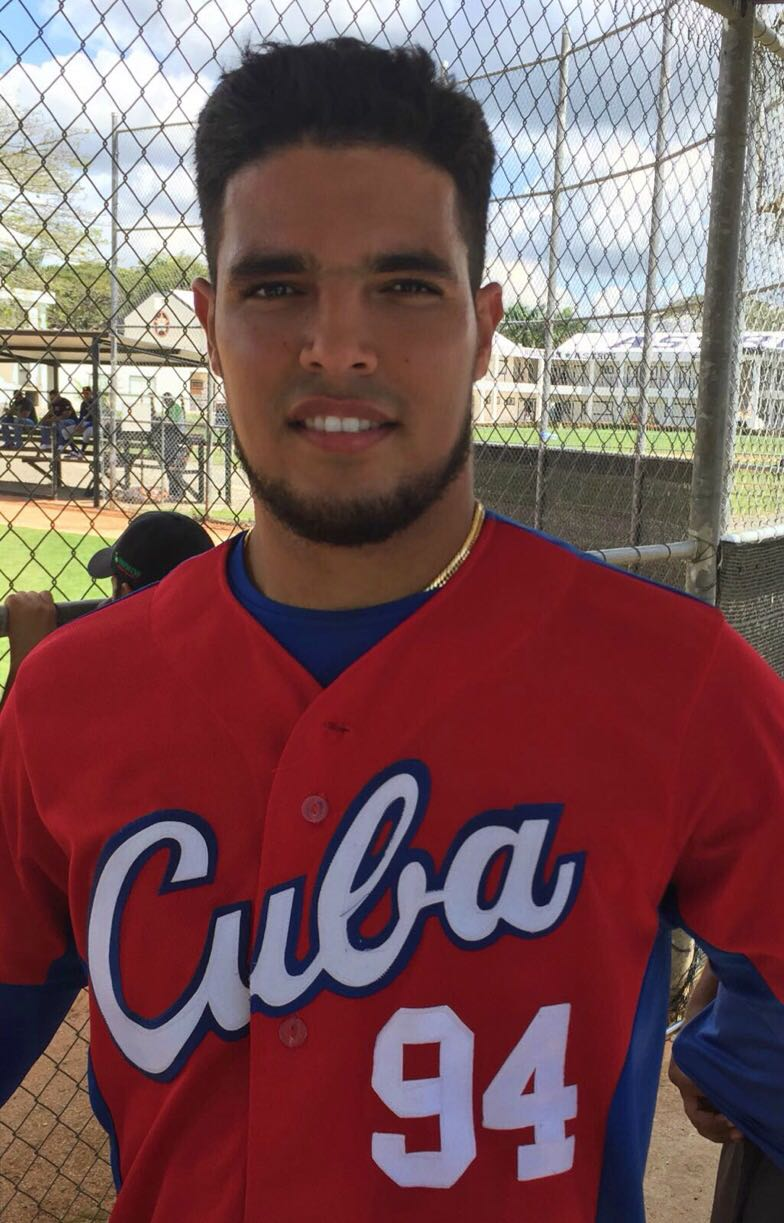
- Pitcher
- Born: March 5, 1994 (age 31); Isla de la Juventud, Cuba
- Batted: Right Threw: Right

NPB debut
- June 2, 2015, for the Yomiuri Giants

Last NPB appearance
- May 17, 2016, for the Yomiuri Giants

NPB statistics
- Win–loss record: 0–0
- Earned run average: 7.71
- Strikeouts: 7
- Stats at Baseball Reference

Teams
- Yomiuri Giants (2014–2016)
Medals
Men's baseball
Representing Cuba
World Youth Baseball Championship
Silver medal – second place	2009 Taichung	Team
Pan American Games
Bronze medal – third place	2010 Mexico	Team
Central American and Caribbean Games
Gold medal – first place	2014 Veracruz	Team
Pan American Games
Bronze medal – third place	2015 Toronto	Team

Héctor Manuel Mendoza Ripoll (born March 5, 1994) is a Cuban former professional baseball pitcher. He played in Nippon Professional Baseball (NPB) for the Yomiuri Giants.

== Career ==
=== Yomiuri Giants ===
Mendoza played with the Isla de la Juventud of the Cuban National Series from 2011 to 2015. On July 17, 2014, Mendoza signed with the Yomiuri Giants of Nippon Professional Baseball. He played with the Yomiuri Giants organization from 2014 to 2016. In 5 games split between two seasons, Mendoza recorded a 7.71 ERA with 7 strikeouts. Mendoza was released by the Giants on December 2, 2016.

=== St. Louis Cardinals ===
On June 7, 2017, Mendoza signed a minor league contract with the St. Louis Cardinals worth $500,000. After signing, Mendoza made his professional debut with the DSL Cardinals. After compiling a 2.57 ERA in seven innings, he was promoted to the Palm Beach Cardinals where he finished the season with a 0–6 record and 5.54 ERA in 19 relief appearances. He began 2018 with the Springfield Cardinals and was promoted to the Memphis Redbirds in May. He finished the year with a 4–4 record and 5.10 ERA in 49 appearances between the two teams. Mendoza recorded a 2.00 ERA in 6 games with Springfield before he was released by the Cardinals on June 4, 2019.

== Cuban National Baseball Team ==
Mendoza won with his national team, the gold medal of the 2014 Central American and Caribbean Games in Veracruz, Mexico.

Mendoza won the title of best right-handed relief pitcher and gold medal in the 2015 Caribbean Series.
