= Brock Kjeldgaard =

Canadian baseball player (born 1986)

- First baseman/Outfielder
- Born: January 22, 1986 (age 40); Edmonton, Alberta, Canada
- Bats: Right Throws: Right
- Stats at Baseball Reference
Medals
Men's baseball
Representing Canada
Pan American Games
Gold medal – first place	2011 Guadalajara	Team
Gold medal – first place	2015 Toronto	Team

Riley "Brock" Kjeldgaard (KELL-guard) (born January 22, 1986) is a Canadian former professional baseball player. Kjeldgaard was born in Edmonton, Alberta. He attended college at Indian Hills Community College in Iowa.

== Career ==
After being drafted by the Milwaukee Brewers in the 34th round of the 2005 MLB draft, he played for the Rookie League Helena Brewers of the Pioneer League. He played the 2006 and 2007 seasons as a pitcher for Helena, pitching in 33 games with a win–loss record of 1–3 and an earned run average of 5.53. He converted to a first baseman and outfielder in 2008 and ended the season with a .278 batting average, 14 home runs, and 65 runs batted in (RBI). In 2009, he played for the Wisconsin Timber Rattlers of the Class-A Midwest League. He led the Timber Rattlers in home runs (20) and RBIs (74). In April 2010, Kjeldgaard was assigned to the Brevard County Manatees of the Class-A Advanced Florida State League, where he started at first base. He was promoted to the Huntsville Stars of the Class-AA Southern League in 2011. He spent all of 2012 with Huntsville, where in 48 games he hit .234/.349/.443 with 8 HR and 29 RBI. On October 27, playing in the Arizona Fall League with the Phoenix Desert Dogs, he broke his foot. He began 2014 in the Atlantic League of Professional Baseball and then moved to the American Association.

Kjeldgaard has played for the Canadian national baseball team. In 2011, he participated in the Pan American Games, winning the gold medal. Along with his teammates, Kjeldgaard was inducted into the Canadian Baseball Hall of Fame in 2012.

On February 1, 2016, Kjeldgaard was released by the Sioux City Explorers.
