= Skyler Stromsmoe =

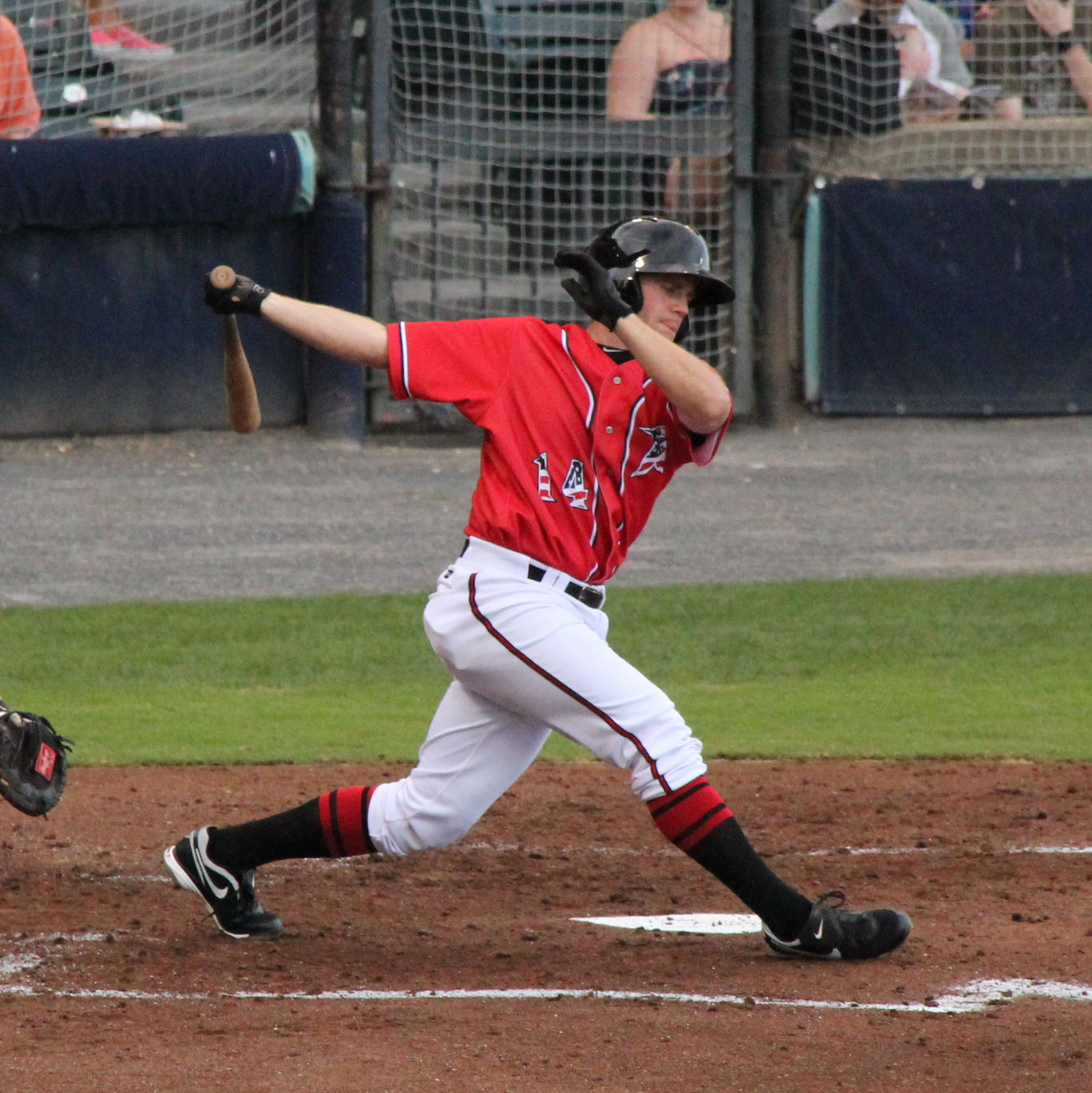
- Stromsmoe with the Richmond Flying Squirrels in 2013
- Utility player
- Born: March 30, 1984 (age 42); Bow Island, Alberta, Canada
- Bats: Switch Throws: Right
- Stats at Baseball Reference
Medals
Men's baseball
Representing Canada
Baseball World Cup
Bronze medal – third place	2011 Panama City	Team
Pan American Games
Gold medal – first place	2011 Guadalajara	Team
Gold medal – first place	2015 Toronto	Team

Skyler Emerson Stromsmoe (born March 30, 1984) is a Canadian former professional baseball utility player. Prior to beginning his professional career, he played college baseball at Longview Community College and Southern Arkansas University. Stromsmoe has also competed for the Canadian national baseball team.

== Career ==
Stromsmoe went to high school in Foremost, Alberta. He attended Longview Community College. He transferred to Southern Arkansas University, where he played for the Southern Arkansas Muleriders team in the Gulf South Conference of the National Collegiate Athletic Association's Division II.

Stromsmoe has played for the Canadian national baseball team. In 2011, he participated in the 2011 Baseball World Cup, winning the bronze medal, and the Pan American Games, winning the gold medal.
