= Veronica Alvarez =

American baseball catcher

Personal information
- Born: April 7, 1983 (age 43) Miami, Florida, U.S.
- Height: 5 ft 6 in (1.68 m)

Sport
- College team: Villanova Wildcats
Medal record
Women's baseball
Representing United States
Women's Baseball World Cup
Bronze medal – third place	2008 Japan	Team competition
Bronze medal – third place	2010 Venezuela	Team competition
Silver medal – second place	2012 Canada	Team competition
Pan American Games
Gold medal – first place	2015 Toronto	Team competition

Veronica Alvarez (born April 7, 1983) is an American baseball catcher. She is a member of the United States women's national baseball team which won a gold medal at the 2015 Pan American Games.

== Biography ==
Alvarez was born in Miami, Florida, on April 7, 1983. She is the daughter of Julio and Ofelia Alvarez, two Cuban immigrants, and the younger of two children. Her passion for baseball started at the age of 5, and by the age of 6, she began to play in Little League.

After Little League (where she pitched for the All-Star Team once), she would switch to softball. Playing for former Cuban national team pitcher Hector Torres, she was a member of the Miami Wildcats (later renamed Stingrays) softball team. Alvarez would earn a scholarship to play at Villanova University, where she played four years and graduated with a Bachelors of Arts in Communication with a minor in Sociology. After graduation, she would spend one year playing softball in Valencia, Spain.

== Return to baseball ==
Alvarez played for the USA Baseball Women's National Team four times in her career as a catcher. Her time with the red, white and blue started in 2008 and every team she participated on medaled in international competition. She ended her playing career in 2015 after the team won a gold medal at the Pan-American Games. 2015 marked the first and only year that Women's baseball was included in the international multi-sport event.

== Coaching ==
Since finishing her playing career in 2015, Alvarez has continued to help grow the next generation of female baseball players as a coach at the MLB Trailblazer Series from 2017-2019 and the MLB Girls Baseball Breakthrough Series Showcase & Development Camp in 2018 and 2019, joining the collaboration between Major League Baseball and USA Baseball to foster the next generation of female baseball players in the United States.

In 2018, Alvarez served as an assistant coach USA Baseball Women's National Team staff.

The following year Alvarez served as a coach with the Oakland Athletics at Major League Baseball Spring Training, a position she still holds.

In 2019, she made her managerial debut with the Women’s National Team. For her work at the helm, Alvarez became the first woman to be named the organization’s Rod Dedeaux Coach of the Year. Under her direction, Team USA finished its tournament with a perfect 7-0 record and the program’s first gold medal since the Toronto 2015 Pan Am Games. The U.S. outscored its opponents 124-20, held a cumulative .500 batting average and hit a record 11 home runs. The team was also named USA Baseball’s Team of the Year after its dominating in the summer of 2019.

Veronica Alvarez continues to serve as the Women’s National team manager. Aside from coaching, Alvarez is a Firefighter-Paramedic for the City of Hollywood Fire Rescue and Beach Safety Department in Hollywood, Florida.

== Bibliography ==
- Ring, Jennifer (2015). "Chapter 8: Veronica Alvarez". A Game of Their Own: Voices of Contemporary Women in Baseball. Nebraska: University of Nebraska Press. pp. 121–138. ISBN 978-0803244801.
