= Vanessa Riopel =

Canadian baseball player from Quebec (born 1990)

Medal record

Women's baseball

Representing Canada

Women's Baseball World Cup
Bronze medal – third place	2012 Canada	Team competition

Pan American Games
Silver medal – second place	2015 Toronto	Team competition

Vanessa Riopel (born May 22, 1990) is a Canadian baseball player from Quebec. She is a member of the Canada women's national baseball team which won a silver medal at the 2015 Pan American Games. She plays as a pitcher for the Victoriaville Laurier/Pub O'Connell of the Quebec Junior Major League Baseball (French: Ligue de baseball junior majeur du Québec).

== Early life ==
Vanessa Riopel was born in Repentigny, Quebec on May 22, 1990. Of note, she was born with a club foot.

Her father is Daniel Riopel and her mother is Céline Majeau. She started to play baseball at the age of 9.

== Personal life ==
She is in a relationship with Canadian soccer player Jessica Lavallée, who gave birth to a son on August 22, 2016.

== Career ==
She joined the Canada Women's National Baseball Team in 2007.

During the winter of 2009, she played for the Footscray Bulldogs in Melbourne, Australia.

Vanessa Riopel plays as a pitcher and a second base for the Victoriaville Laurier/Pub O'Connell of the Quebec Junior Major League Baseball (French: Ligue de baseball junior majeur du Québec) in 2014. She is the only female to play in the league.
