= Marti Sementelli =

American baseball player

Medal record

Women's baseball

Representing United States

Women's Baseball World Cup
Bronze medal – third place	2008 Japan	Team competition
Bronze medal – third place	2010 Venezuela	Team competition
Silver medal – second place	2012 Canada	Team competition
Silver medal – second place	2014 Japan	Team competition

Pan American Games
Gold medal – first place	2015 Toronto	Team competition

Marti Sementelli (born November 17, 1992, in Boston) is a member of the United States women's national baseball team which won a gold medal at the 2015 Pan American Games.

== Playing career ==
Sementelli played Little League Baseball in Sherman Oaks, California, earning All-Star honors. During high school, she spent two years on the baseball team at Burbank High and two playing for Matt Mowry at Birmingham High. While at Birmingham, she pitched a complete game against San Marcos High School of Santa Barbara, throwing 102 pitches. At 15 years of age, she competed with Team USA at the Women's World Cup of Baseball. Of note, she was the youngest player on the US roster.

In 2011, she earned a baseball scholarship to Montreat College in North Carolina, played for coach Michael Bender.

== Awards and honors ==
- 2008 World Cup All-Tournament Team (Best Righthanded Pitcher)

== Personal ==
She was once interviewed by Jimmy Kimmel.

== Bibliography ==
- Ring, Jennifer (2015). "Chapter 12: Marti Sementelli". A Game of Their Own: Voices of Contemporary Women in Baseball. Lincoln and London: University of Nebraska Press. pp. 195–210. ISBN 978-0803244801.
