= Malaika Underwood =

American sports executive and baseball player

Medal record

Women's baseball

Representing United States

Women's Baseball World Cup
Gold medal – first place	2006 Taiwan	Team competition
Bronze medal – third place	2008 Japan	Team competition
Bronze medal – third place	2010 Venezuela	Team competition
Silver medal – second place	2012 Canada	Team competition
Silver medal – second place	2014 Japan	Team competition

Pan American Games
Gold medal – first place	2015 Toronto	Team competition

Malaika Underwood (born June 7, 1981) is the executive director of the Professional Women's Hockey League Players Association. She is a former member of the United States women's national baseball team which won a gold medal at the 2015 Pan American Games.

== Playing career ==
Raised in San Diego, California, Underwood played baseball, volleyball, and basketball at La Jolla High School. She would earn the Female Athlete of the Year Award in 1999 in San Diego.

=== Baseball ===
As a child, Underwood played baseball at Chollas Lake Little League. She pitched and played second base at La Jolla. She coached Little League baseball in Chapel Hill, North Carolina in 2001 while in college.

Underwood played for the U.S. women's national baseball team from 2006 to 2022 and was named to the all-tournament team at the 2008 and 2014 Women's Baseball World Cup. She was named the USA Baseball Sportswoman of the Year in 2015.

She later was an assistant coach for the team.

=== Volleyball ===
Underwood accepted a volleyball scholarship to play for the University of North Carolina Tar Heels. She won the Atlantic Coast Conference Tournament MVP Award in 2001.

== Awards and honors ==
- 2008 Women's Baseball World Cup All-Tournament Team (second base)
- 2014 Women's Baseball World Cup All-Tournament Team (first base)
- 2015 USA Baseball Sportswoman of the Year

== Personal life ==
Underwood earned a bachelor's degree in international studies and a master's degree in sports administration from the University of North Carolina.

== Bibliography ==
- Ring, Jennifer (2015). "Chapter 11: Malaika Underwood". A Game of Their Own: Voices of Contemporary Women in Baseball. Lincoln and London: University of Nebraska Press. pp. 173–193. ISBN 978-0803244801.
