= Heidi Northcott =

Canadian baseball player (born 1992)

Medal record

Women's baseball

Representing Canada

Women's Baseball World Cup
Bronze medal – third place	2012 Canada	Team competition

Pan American Games
Silver medal – second place	2015 Toronto	Team competition

Heidi Northcott (born November 2, 1992, in Rocky Mountain House, Alberta) is a Canadian baseball player. She is a member of the Canada women's national baseball team which won a silver medal at the 2015 Pan American Games.

== Playing career ==
=== Baseball ===
At the 2012 Women’s World Cup, Northcott earned a win against Cuba, making a relief appearance. In Canada’s opening game of the 2014 Women's Baseball World Cup, Northcott combined with pitcher Cindy Saavedra on a no-hitter against the Netherlands.

== Awards and honours ==
- Top Pitcher, 2004 Canadian Pee Wee Nationals

== Personal ==
Her father Harold Northcott was a pitcher for the Canadian national men’s baseball team from 1982 to 1987. He would also serve as the pitching coach from 1992 to 2001.
