= Freddy Álvarez (baseball) =

Cuban baseball player (born 1989)

- Pitcher
- Born: 29 April 1989 (age 37); Sagua La Grande, Villa Clara Province, Cuba
- Bats: Right Throws: Right
- Stats at Baseball Reference
Medals
Men's baseball
Representing Cuba
Pan American Games
Bronze medal – third place	2015 Toronto	Team
Central American and Caribbean Games
Silver medal – second place	2018 Barranquilla	Team

Freddy Asiel Álvarez Saez (born 29 April 1989) is a Cuban former baseball pitcher. Álvarez played for the Naranjas de Villa Clara in the Cuban National Series.

== Career ==
Álvarez was born on 29 April 1989 in Sagua La Grande, Villa Clara Province. He made his Cuban National Series in 2006, playing for Villa Clara, appearing in 12 games. He retired after the 2024 season.

In international play, Álvarez played for the Cuban national baseball team in the 2005 World Youth Baseball Championship, 2006 World Junior Baseball Championship, 2009 World Port Tournament, 2013 World Baseball Classic and the 2017 World Baseball Classic.
