= Bradi Wall =

Canadian baseball player (born 1991)

Medal record

Women's baseball

Representing Canada

Women's Baseball World Cup
Bronze medal – third place	2012 Canada	Team competition

Pan American Games
Silver medal – second place	2015 Toronto	Team competition

Bradi Wall (born December 16, 1991, in Swift Current, Saskatchewan) is a Canadian baseball player. She is a member of the Canada women's national baseball team which won a silver medal at the 2015 Pan American Games.

== Playing career ==
=== NCAA ===
In 2010 and 2011, Wall was a member of the softball team at Iowa Western Community College. 2024 Bradi Wall was inducted into Hall of Fame For Iowa Western Community College for the women’s Softball team as a standout player in her two seasons with the Reivers. Wall competed in softball for two seasons with the University of Iowa Hawkeyes. Playing at second base, she started 106 of 107 games in her NCAA career.

=== Baseball ===
She has competed with the Canadian national team in two then–IBAF Women's World Cups (2012, 2014), earning the bronze medal in 2012.

In 2014, she competed with Team Alberta, winning a gold medal at the Senior Women's Invitational National Championships in Canada.

== Awards and honours ==
- 2011 Louisville Slugger NJCAA DI All-Region first team
- 2011 NFCA All-America first team
- 2011 NJCAA All-America second team honors
- 2012 Jimmy Rattlesnake Award
- 2013 Academic All-Big Ten Selection
- 2024 Iowa Western Athletic Hall of Fame

== Personal ==
She graduated from the University of Iowa in 2013. Her father Ken Wall was a competitive wrestler at the University of Saskatchewan.
