= Ryleigh Buck =

American softball and baseball player

Personal information
- Born: January 19, 1998 (age 28) McPherson, Kansas, U.S.
- Height: 5 ft 8 in (1.73 m)

Sport
- College team: Wichita State Shockers

Ryleigh Buck
Medal record

Women's baseball

Representing United States

Pan American Games
Gold medal – first place	2015 Toronto	Team competition

Ryleigh Buck (born January 19, 1998) is an American softball and baseball player. She is a member of the United States women's national baseball team which won a gold medal at the 2015 Pan American Games.

== Biography ==
Ryleigh Buck was born in McPherson, Kansas on January 19, 1998. She attended Wellington High School in Wellington, Kansas.

Buck signed her national letter of intent to play softball at the University of Central Florida. After one semester she transferred to play softball at Wichita State University. She played softball for the Wichita-based Mustangs organization. She competed for the United States women's national baseball team at the Women's baseball tournament of the 2015 Pan American Games.
