= Nate Smith (pitcher) =

American baseball player (born 1991)

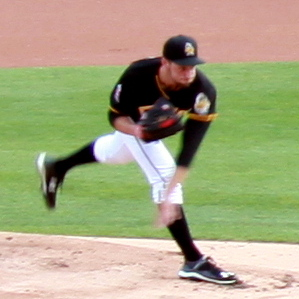
- Smith with the Salt Lake Bees in 2009
- Pitcher
- Born: August 28, 1991 (age 34); West Chester, Ohio, U.S.
- Bats: Left Throws: Left
- Stats at Baseball Reference
Medals
Men's baseball
Representing United States
Pan American Games
Silver medal – second place	2015 Toronto	Team

Nate David Smith (born August 28, 1991) is an American former professional baseball pitcher. Despite spending time on the 40-man roster of the Los Angeles Angels, he never played in Major League Baseball (MLB).

== Career ==
After graduating from Lakota West High School, Smith played college baseball at Furman University. He was drafted by the Los Angeles Angels of Anaheim in the eighth round, with the 247th overall selection, of the 2013 Major League Baseball draft.

Smith signed with the Angels and made his professional debut with the rookie-level Orem Owlz. He spent the whole season there, going 2–2 with a 3.86 ERA and 31 strikeouts in 35 innings. Smith started 2014 with the High-A Inland Empire 66ers and was later promoted to the Double-A Arkansas Travelers. In 21 starts between the two teams, he compiled an 11–6 record and 2.97 ERA with 118 strikeouts. After the season, Smith played for the Mesa Solar Sox in the Arizona Fall League.

In 2015, Smith played for Arkansas and the Triple-A Salt Lake Bees where he posted a 10–8 record with a 3.86 ERA and 104 strikeouts in 24 starts. In July 2015, he pitched for Team USA at the 2015 Pan American Games.

In 2016, Smith pitched for Triple-A Salt Lake, where he was 8–9 with a 4.61 ERA and 122 strikeouts in 26 starts. On November 18, 2016, the Angels added Smith to their 40-man roster to protect him from the Rule 5 draft.

In 2017, Smith played in only four games for Salt Lake and the rookie-level Arizona League Angels, due to injury. Smith missed the entirety of the 2018 season due to anterior capsule surgery. On January 9, 2018, Smith was designated for assignment by the Angels. He cleared waivers and was sent outright to Triple-A Salt Lake on January 13. Smith was released by the Angels organization on May 3, 2019.
