= Claire Eccles =

Canadian baseball player

New York Heights – No. 21
- Outfielder/Pitcher
- Born: October 25, 1997 (age 28)
- Bats: Left Throws: Left

West Coast League debut
- June 8, 2017, for the Victoria HarbourCats

WPBL statistics (through September 4, 2026)
- Batting average: .282
- Home runs: 0
- Runs batted in: 5
- Stats at Baseball Reference

Teams
- Victoria HarbourCats (2017); New York Heights (2026–present)
Medals
Women's baseball
Representing Canada
Women's Baseball World Cup
Silver medal – second place	2016 South Korea	Team competition
Pan American Games
Silver medal – second place	2015 Toronto	Team competition

Claire Kirino Eccles (born October 25, 1997) is a Canadian baseball player. She currently plays for the New York Heights of the Women's Pro Baseball League. She is a left-handed pitcher who throws three pitches, including a knuckleball. She has been a member of the women's national baseball team of Canada, and has competed in the 2014 and 2016 Women's Baseball World Cups as well as the 2015 Pan American Games. In 2017, she joined the Victoria HarbourCats of the West Coast League and became the first woman to play in that league. She was also a member of the softball team at the University of British Columbia.

== Baseball ==
=== Canadian National Team ===
Eccles made her international debut at 16 in the 2014 Women's Baseball World Cup. She appeared in one game and pitched four scoreless innings as the Canadian team finished in fourth place. In 2015, she competed in the women's baseball tournament in the 2015 Pan American Games. It was the debut appearance of women's baseball in the Pan American games, and the Canadian team won the silver medal. The team would again take silver at the 2016 Women's Baseball World Cup, with Eccles going 1–0 with a 0.00 ERA over 8 2/3 innings and recording five strikeouts.

=== West Coast League ===
On May 16, 2017, the Victoria HarbourCats of the West Coast League, a collegiate summer baseball league, announced the signing of Eccles. Following the announcement, R. A. Dickey, a knuckleballer pitching in the major leagues, posted a message of congratulations on Twitter.

On June 8, Eccles made her HarbourCats debut against the Wenatchee AppleSox, becoming the first woman to play in the WCL. She entered in relief and pitched two innings, giving up one hit, one walk, and two runs. On June 18, Eccles made her first start and earned her first win for Victoria, as the HarbourCats won 11–2 in a non-league game against the Kitsap BlueJackets, a former WCL team. She appeared in eight games for the HarbourCats in 2017.

The team announced on its website that she would have returned for its 2018 season but was ultimately not on the roster.

=== Pitching style ===
Eccles throws three pitches, a two-seam fastball, curveball and knuckleball. Although she throws a knuckleball, she uses her pitches evenly and does not consider herself a "knuckleball pitcher".

=== Women's Pro Baseball League ===
In the inaugural Women's Pro Baseball League draft, Eccles was selected 38th overall by WPBL New York as an outfielder.

== Softball ==
Eccles was a member of the softball team at the University of British Columbia. Unlike baseball, she did not pitch, but played the outfield. In her sophomore season, she hit .293. In her junior season, she hit .358 and was named a second-team all star and gold glove award winner for the Cascade Collegiate Conference. In her senior and last season, her hitting average was .362.
