= Niki Boyd =

Canadian baseball player

Medal record

Women's baseball

Representing Canada

Women's Baseball World Cup
Bronze medal – third place	2012 Canada	Team competition

Pan American Games
Silver medal – second place	2015 Toronto	Team competition

Veronika "Niki" Boyd (born January 3, 1993, in New Westminster, British Columbia) is a Canadian baseball player. She is a member of the Canada women's national baseball team which won a silver medal at the 2015 Pan American Games.

== Playing career ==
=== Softball ===
Boyd competed in softball at Douglas College. She helped the program capture a silver medal in the 2014 Northwest Athletic Conference Championships.

=== Baseball ===
Boyd has competed in two IBAF Women's World Cups (2012, 2014).

== Awards and honours ==
- 2013 Jimmy Rattlesnake Award

== Personal ==
Her birth name is Veronika and she has four older brothers.
