= Anna Kimbrell =

American baseball player

Medal record

Women's baseball

Representing United States

Women's Baseball World Cup
Bronze medal – third place	2008 Japan	Team competition
Bronze medal – third place	2010 Venezuela	Team competition
Silver medal – second place	2012 Canada	Team competition
Silver medal – second place	2014 Japan	Team competition

Pan American Games
Gold medal – first place	2015 Toronto	Team competition

Anna Kimbrell (born October 4, 1990) is a member of the United States women's national baseball team which won a gold medal at the 2015 Pan American Games.

== Playing career ==
Kimbrell, a pitcher and catcher, has been affiliated with Team USA women's baseball since 2006. Growing up, she played baseball throughout Little League. She played for Nation Ford High, where she was the first girl to play high school baseball in South Carolina, and later went on to be the first girl to play American Legion baseball in the state. She began playing at age 8 with Rock Hill Little League baseball. With the Piedmont Patriots in 2003, she was the only girl to play in a 64-team tournament in Cooperstown. On July 14, 2016, Kimbrell became the third female player to join the Sonoma Stompers where she joined USWNT teammates Stacy Piagno and Kelsie Whitmore. On July 22, 2016, Kimbrell and Whitmore combined to make history as the first all-female professional battery (baseball) in nearly 70 years.

== Softball ==
AK played Division I softball at Samford University before transferring to the University of Alabama at Birmingham from where she graduated in 2013. In her senior season, she was the starting catcher for the UAB Blazers.

== Awards and honors ==
- Conference USA All-Second Team
