= Stéphanie Savoie =

Canadian baseball catcher from Quebec (born 1989)

Medal record

Women's baseball

Representing Canada

Women's Baseball World Cup
Silver medal – second place	2008 Japan	Team competition
Bronze medal – third place	2012 Canada	Team competition

Pan American Games
Silver medal – second place	2015 Toronto	Team competition

Stéphanie Savoie (born September 11, 1989) is a Canadian baseball catcher from Quebec. She is a member of the Canada women's national baseball team which won a silver medal at the 2015 Pan American Games.

She was named twice best catcher of the Women's World Cup.

== Playing career ==
Savoie has competed at the catcher position in four IBAF Women's World Cups (2008, 2010, 2012, 2014). At the 2012 IBAF Women's World Cup, she batted .520, while at the 2014 edition, she posted a .450 batting average, complemented by 7 RBI's. Also in 2014, she threw out six attempted base stealers, leading all catchers in the tournament. Competing with Team Alberta, she helped the squad capture the gold medal at the 2014 Senior Women's Invitational (also known as the Canadian women's baseball championships).

== Awards and honours ==
- 2012 IBAF Women's World Cup All-Tournament Team (Catcher)
- 2014 IBAF Women's World Cup All-Tournament Team (Catcher)
- Finalist, 2014 Tip O’Neill Award
- 2019 inductee, Baseball Québec Hall of Fame (Temple de la renommée du baseball québécois RDS)

== Personal ==
Savoie is employed as a physical education teacher. Her favorite baseball player is catcher Russell Martin.
