= Jessica Bérubé =

Canadian baseball player

Medal record

Women's baseball

Representing Canada

Women's Baseball World Cup
Bronze medal – third place	2012 Canada	Team competition

Pan American Games
Silver medal – second place	2015 Toronto	Team competition

Jessica Bérubé (born November 24, 1992) is a Canadian baseball pitcher from Quebec. She is a member of the Canada women's national baseball team which won a silver medal at the 2015 Pan American Games.

She plays for the Haute-Saint-Charles Pirates of the Quebec Junior Major Baseball League (French: Ligue de baseball junior majeur du Québec).
