= Melissa Armstrong =

Canadian baseball player (born 1990)

Medal record

Women's baseball

Representing Canada

Women's Baseball World Cup
Silver medal – second place	2008 Japan	Team competition
Bronze medal – third place	2012 Canada	Team competition

Pan American Games
Silver medal – second place	2015 Toronto	Team competition

Melissa Armstrong (born September 18, 1990, in Saskatoon, Saskatchewan) is a Canadian baseball player. She is a member of the Canada women's national baseball team which won a silver medal at the 2015 Pan American Games.

== Playing career ==
=== Baseball ===
Armstrong made her debut with the Canadian national team prior to her senior year of high school. Of note, she has competed in five IBAF Women's World Cups (2008, 2010, 2012, 2014, 2016). Competing with Team Alberta, she helped the squad capture the gold medal at the 2014 Senior Women's Invitational (also known as the Canadian women's baseball championships).

== Personal ==
Aside from baseball, Armstrong attended the UoS to receive an undergraduate degree in history and political studies, a master's degree in African studies from Oxford University and a PhD in history from Carleton University. She is currently in medical school at the University of Saskatchewan.

She just married Benjamin
