= Kelsey Lalor =

Canadian baseball player (born 1998)

Medal record

Women's baseball

Representing Canada

Pan American Games
Silver medal – second place	2015 Toronto	Team competition

Kelsey Lalor (born March 1, 1998, in Red Deer, Alberta) is a Canadian baseball player. She is a member of the Canada women's national baseball team which won a silver medal at the 2015 Pan American Games.

== Playing career ==
=== Baseball ===
Lalor made her debut for the national team at the 2013 Canada-Japan series in Granby, QC. Competing at the 2014 IBAF Women’s World Cup, Lalor scored five runs while registering four RBI’s in six games played. Competing with Team Alberta, she helped the squad capture the gold medal at the 2014 Senior Women’s Invitational (also known as the Canadian women’s baseball championships).

She joined the Boise State Broncos softball team in 2020, where she played shortstop. She was named to the All-Mountain West Conference team in 2022.

== Honors and awards ==
Lalor has received several award:

- 2014, 2015, 2016: Female Athlete of the Year at E’cole Lindsay Thurber School
- 2016 & 2018: Women's Open Player of the Year by Baseball Alberta
- 2018: All-World Team as an outfielder in 2018
- 2019: Baseball Canada Women's National Team MVP
- 2020: Academic All-Mountain West
- 2020: Mountain West Scholar-Athlete
- 2022L All Mountain West Conference (softball)
