= Ella Matteucci =

Canadian baseball and ice hockey player

Personal information
- Born: August 2, 1993 (age 33) Kelowna, British Columbia, Canada
- Home town: Fruitvale, British Columbia, Canada
- Education: Clarkson University
- Height: 5 ft (1.5 m)
- Weight: 154 lb (70 kg)
Ice hockey career
- Position: Defense
- Shoots: Right
- PWHPA team Former teams: Team Sonnet: PWHPA Toronto; Markham Thunder; Clarkson Golden Knights
- Playing career: 2011–present

Sport
- Country: Canada
- Sport: Baseball
- Position: Pitcher, outfield
Medal record
Women's baseball
Representing Canada
Pan American Games
Silver medal – second place	2015 Toronto	Tournament

Daniella "Ella" Matteucci (born August 2, 1993) is a Canadian ice hockey and baseball player, currently playing with the Team Sonnet of the Professional Women's Hockey Players Association (PWHPA). She played ice hockey with the Clarkson Golden Knights women's ice hockey program and the Markham Thunder of the Canadian Women's Hockey League (CWHL). As a member of the Canadian women's national baseball team, she won a silver medal at the 2015 Pan American Games.

== Playing career ==
=== Hockey ===
At the 2011 Canada Winter Games, she was the captain of Team British Columbia. Of note, she would help her high school team, the Notre Dame Hounds, capture the 2011 Esso Cup, the premier Canadian championship for midget AAA women's hockey clubs. The final score was a 4–3 shootout against the St. Albert Slash. Matteucci logged two assists in the game, assisting on a first period goal by Taylor Woods and a goal by Jennifer More in the third period.

She joined the professional hockey team, the Markham Thunder, for the 2018–19 CWHL season, the CWHL's final season before folding in May 2019.

=== Baseball ===
In her senior year of high school, she pitched a no-hitter for the Notre Dame Hounds boys’ team; Matteucci was the only girl on the team. At the 2014 Women's Baseball World Cup in Miyazaki, Japan, Matteucci pitched against the Japanese team, allowing seven runs.

== Career statistics ==
=== NCAA ===
Year	GP	G	A	PTS	PIM	GWG
2011-12	36	1	2	3	14	0
2012–13	36	2	2	4	2	1
2013–14	41	0	4	4	12	0
2014–15	38	4	6	10	30	0

== Awards and honours ==
- 2014 NCAA Frozen Four national championship

== Personal ==
She graduated from Clarkson University in May 2015 with a degree in history and a minor in business.
