= Becky Hartley =

Canadian baseball player (born 1985)

Medal record

Women's baseball

Representing Canada

Women's Baseball World Cup
Bronze medal – third place	2012 Canada	Team competition
Silver medal – second place	2016 Canada	Team competition

Pan American Games
Silver medal – second place	2015 Toronto	Team competition

Rebecca "Becky" Hartley (born September 2, 1985 in Richmond, British Columbia) is a Canadian baseball player. She is a member of the Canada women's national baseball team which won a silver medal at the 2015 Pan American Games.

== Playing career ==
=== Softball ===
Hartley competed as a catcher in softball at Simon Fraser University. She was a member of the Canadian roster at the 2006 Women's Softball World Championship, along with the 2007 Summer Universiade. In addition, Hartley competed with the Valencia Antorcha softball club in Spain.

=== Baseball ===
Hartley has competed in two IBAF Women's World Cups (2010, 2012), transitioning to the game from softball at the age of 25, competing in the outfield. At the 2012 Women's Baseball World Cup, she scored four runs in the bronze medal game. Competing with Team British Columbia, she helped the squad to a silver medal at the 2012 Senior Women's Invitational (also known as the Canadian women's baseball championships).

== Personal ==
She earned a Doctor of Medicine at the University of British Columbia and is currently a plastic surgery resident at the University of Calgary.
