= Sarah Hudek =

American baseball player

- Outfielder
- Born: January 2, 1998 (age 28); Sugar Land, Texas, U.S.
- Bats: Left Throws: Left

Teams
- Bossier Parish CC (2016); Texas A&M (2017-2018); Louisiana (2019-2020)

Career highlights and awards
- 2014 USA Baseball Sportswoman of the Year; Texas Class 4A Semifinalist Team; 2017 SEC All-Freshman Team member; 2018 NFCA All-South Region Team member; 2018 SEC All-Defensive Team member; 2019 NFCA All-Central Region Second Team member; 2019 Sun Belt Conference Newcomer of the Year; 2019 All-Sun Belt First Team member; 2019 Sun Belt Tournament All-Tournament team member; 2019 All-Louisiana First Team member
- Last updated on: 16 February 2020

Sarah Hudek
Medal record

Women's baseball

Representing United States

Women's Baseball World Cup
Silver medal – second place	2014 Japan	Team competition

Pan American Games
Gold medal – first place	2015 Toronto	Team competition

Sarah Hudek (born January 20, 1997) is a left-handed pitcher and former outfielder for the Louisiana Ragin' Cajuns softball team and member of the United States women's national baseball team which won a gold medal at the 2015 Pan American Games. Her father, John Hudek was a former Major League Baseball Pitcher.

== Playing career ==
Hudek played on the varsity baseball team at George Ranch High School in Houston, Texas. She has accepted a scholarship to pitch at Bossier Parish Community College. She became the first woman ever to pitch for the program.

=== USA Baseball ===
As a 17-year-old, she made her debut for Team USA at the 2014 Women's Baseball World Cup, earning a silver medal. She earned a 1–1 record, along with a 0.53 ERA in 17 innings. At the plate, she went 8 for 18 for a .444 batting average, which included a triple and an RBI.

== Awards and honors ==
- 2014 USA Baseball Sportswoman of the Year Award
