= Rudy Reyes (athlete) =

Cuban baseball player

Medal record

Men's baseball

Representing Cuba

World Baseball Classic
Silver medal – second place	2006 San Diego	Team

Baseball World Cup
Gold medal – first place	2005 Rotterdam	Team
Silver medal – second place	2007 Taipei	Team

Intercontinental Cup
Gold medal – first place	2006 Taichung	Team

Pan American Games
Bronze medal – third place	2011 Guadalajara	Team

Central American and Caribbean Games
Gold medal – first place	2006 Cartagena	Team

Rudy Reyes Erice (born November 5, 1979, in Arroyo Naranjo, Havana, Cuba) is an infielder for Industriales of the Cuban National Series and the Cuban national baseball team. He was part of the Cuban team at the 2006 World Baseball Classic.

Reyes, who hit .308 for Industriales during 2005-06, split his time between second base (38 games), third base (25 games) and shortstop (21 games).

He is the son of former boxer Pedro Orlando Reyes.
