= Jenna Marston =

American baseball player

Medal record

Women's baseball

Representing United States

Women's Baseball World Cup
Bronze medal – third place	2010 Venezuela	Team competition
Silver medal – second place	2012 Canada	Team competition
Silver medal – second place	2014 Japan	Team competition

Pan American Games
Gold medal – first place	2015 Toronto	Team competition

Jenna Marston (born July 16, 1991) is a member of the United States women's national baseball team which won a gold medal at the 2015 Pan American Games.

== Playing career ==
=== Baseball ===
At Principia High School in Missouri, she played on the boys' varsity baseball team with her brother Christopher. Before high school, she was on a travel team with the St. Louis Amateur Baseball Association.

Playing for Team USA at the 2010 Women's Baseball World Cup, she logged a .593 batting average, second highest among all players. She led all Team USA players in the tournament with 16 hits and eight doubles.

=== Softball ===
Earning a softball scholarship at the University of Missouri, she played catcher, outfield and shortstop.

== Awards and honors ==
- 2010 USA Baseball Sportswoman of the Year
- 2011 John E Wray Award (awarded at the St. Louis Baseball Writers' Dinner)
- 2011 Premier Player of College Softball as voted by the fans.
