= 2023 Women's Baseball Asian Cup =

Tournament details
- Country: Hong Kong
- Venue: 1 (in 1 host city)
- Dates: 21 May – 1 June
- Teams: 12 (from 1 confederation)
- Defending champions: Japan

Final positions
- Champions: Japan (3rd title)
- Runners-up: Chinese Taipei
- Third place: South Korea
- Fourth place: Hong Kong

The 2023 Women's Baseball Asian Cup is the third edition of the Women's Baseball Asian Cup.

Held from 21 May to 1 June 2023 in Hong Kong, the tournament serves as the Asian qualifiers for the 2024 Women's Baseball World Cup. Three berths are to be contested.

== Teams ==
Six teams directly qualified for the opening round, and were joined by top two teams from the qualifier round.

Opening round	Qualifier round
China; Chinese Taipei; Japan; South Korea; Philippines	Hong Kong (Hosts; assured berth in the opening round); India; Indonesia; Malaysia; Pakistan; Sri Lanka; Thailand

== Qualifier round ==
=== Group A ===
Pos	Team	Pld	W	L	RF	RA	RD	PCT	GB	Qualification
1	Indonesia	3	3	0	54	7	+47	1.000	—	Advance to opening round
2	Pakistan	3	2	1	40	12	+28	.667	1	
3	Hong Kong (H)	3	1	2	23	49	−26	.333	2	Advance to opening round as hosts
4	Sri Lanka	3	0	3	17	66	−49	.000	3	

Source: BFA
Rules for classification: 1) Wins/losses; 2) Head to head; 3) Teams quality balance; 4) Earned runs team's quality balance; 5) Head to head highest batting average; 6) Coin toss
(H) Hosts

Date	Local time	Road team	Score	Home team	Inn.	Venue	Game duration	Attendance	Boxscore
21 May	13:30	Sri Lanka	3–24	Indonesia	4	Sai Tso Wan Recreation Ground	2:16	55	Report
21 May	17:00	Pakistan	16–1	Hong Kong	4	Sai Tso Wan Recreation Ground	2:11	100	Report
22 May	10:00	Pakistan	22–3	Sri Lanka	5	Sai Tso Wan Recreation Ground	2:19	20	Report
22 May	13:30	Indonesia	22–2	Hong Kong	4	Sai Tso Wan Recreation Ground	2:56	19	Report
23 May	10:00	Indonesia	8–2	Pakistan	7	Sai Tso Wan Recreation Ground	2:32	30	Report
23 May	13:30	Hong Kong	20–11	Sri Lanka	7	Sai Tso Wan Recreation Ground	3:20	36	Report

=== Group B ===
Pos	Team	Pld	W	L	RF	RA	RD	PCT	GB	Qualification
1	India	2	2	0	28	8	+20	1.000	—	Advance to opening round
2	Thailand	2	1	1	19	12	+7	.500	1	
3	Malaysia	2	0	2	3	30	−27	.000	2	

Source: BFA
Rules for classification: 1) Wins/losses; 2) Head to head; 3) Teams quality balance; 4) Earned runs team's quality balance; 5) Head to head highest batting average; 6) Coin toss

Date	Local time	Road team	Score	Home team	Inn.	Venue	Game duration	Attendance	Boxscore
21 May	10:00	Thailand	8–9	India	7	Sai Tso Wan Recreation Ground	3:04	30	Report
22 May	17:00	Malaysia	3–11	Thailand	7	Sai Tso Wan Recreation Ground	3:01	30	Report
23 May	17:00	India	19–0	Malaysia	4	Sai Tso Wan Recreation Ground	2:13	10	Report

== Opening round ==
=== Group A ===
Pos	Team	Pld	W	L	RF	RA	RD	PCT	GB	Qualification
1	Chinese Taipei	3	3	0	53	0	+53	1.000	—	Advance to super round
2	Hong Kong (H)	3	2	1	32	32	0	.667	1	Advance to super round
3	China	3	1	2	15	47	−32	.333	2	Advance to classification round
4	India	3	0	3	11	32	−21	.000	3	Advance to classification round

Source: WBSC Asia
Rules for classification: 1) Wins/losses; 2) Head to head; 3) Teams quality balance; 4) Earned runs team's quality balance; 5) Head to head highest batting average; 6) Coin toss
(H) Hosts

Date	Local time	Road team	Score	Home team	Inn.	Venue	Game duration	Attendance	Boxscore
26 May	14:00	China	0–23	Chinese Taipei	4	Sai Tso Wan Recreation Ground	1:59	100	Report
26 May	18:00	India	7–12	Hong Kong	7	Sai Tso Wan Recreation Ground	2:49	80	Report
27 May	15:00	Hong Kong	20–6	China	6	Sai Tso Wan Recreation Ground	2:45	100	Report
27 May	18:00	Chinese Taipei	11–0	India	5	Sai Tso Wan Recreation Ground	1:30	70	Report
28 May	12:00	Hong Kong	0–19	Chinese Taipei	4	Sai Tso Wan Recreation Ground	1:39	88	Report
28 May	18:00	India	4–9	China	7	Sai Tso Wan Recreation Ground	2:54	36	Report

=== Group B ===
Pos	Team	Pld	W	L	RF	RA	RD	PCT	GB	Qualification
1	Japan	3	3	0	44	1	+43	1.000	—	Advance to super round
2	South Korea	3	2	1	30	18	+12	.667	1	Advance to super round
3	Philippines	3	1	2	17	17	0	.333	2	Advance to classification round
4	Indonesia	3	0	3	4	59	−55	.000	3	Advance to classification round

Source: WBSC Asia
Rules for classification: 1) Wins/losses; 2) Head to head; 3) Teams quality balance; 4) Earned runs team's quality balance; 5) Head to head highest batting average; 6) Coin toss

Date	Local time	Road team	Score	Home team	Inn.	Venue	Game duration	Attendance	Boxscore
26 May	8:00	Indonesia	1–11	Philippines	5	Sai Tso Wan Recreation Ground	2:02	30	Report
26 May	11:00	South Korea	0–10	Japan	5	Sai Tso Wan Recreation Ground	1:40	45	Report
27 May	9:00	South Korea	21–3	Indonesia	5	Sai Tso Wan Recreation Ground	2:19	35	Report
27 May	12:00	Philippines	1–7	Japan	7	Sai Tso Wan Recreation Ground	2:09	120	Report
28 May	9:00	Philippines	5–9	South Korea	7	Sai Tso Wan Recreation Ground	2:57	120	Report
28 May	15:00	Japan	27–0	Indonesia	4	Sai Tso Wan Recreation Ground	1:35	38	Report

== Classification round ==
Pos	Team	Pld	W	L	RF	RA	RD	PCT	GB
1	Philippines	3	3	0	39	4	+35	1.000	—
2	China	3	2	1	23	20	+3	.667	1
3	India	3	1	2	19	31	−12	.333	2
4	Indonesia	3	0	3	11	37	−26	.000	3

Source: WBSC Asia
Rules for classification: 1) Wins/losses; 2) Head to head; 3) Teams quality balance; 4) Earned runs team's quality balance; 5) Head to head highest batting average; 6) Coin toss

Date	Local time	Road team	Score	Home team	Inn.	Venue	Game duration	Attendance	Boxscore
30 May	9:00	Indonesia	10–13	India	7	Sai Tso Wan Recreation Ground	2:39	50	Report
30 May	12:00	China	1–16	Philippines	4	Sai Tso Wan Recreation Ground	2:01	80	Report
31 May	9:00	Indonesia	0–13	China	5	Sai Tso Wan Recreation Ground	2:00	30	Report
31 May	12:00	India	2–12	Philippines	5	Sai Tso Wan Recreation Ground	1:57	85	Report

== Super round ==
Pos	Team	Pld	W	L	RF	RA	RD	PCT	GB	Qualification
1	Japan	3	3	0	37	1	+36	1.000	—	Advance to final
2	Chinese Taipei	3	2	1	35	17	+18	.667	1	Advance to final
3	South Korea	3	1	2	23	27	−4	.333	2	Advance to third place play-off
4	Hong Kong (H)	3	0	3	2	52	−50	.000	3	Advance to third place play-off

Source: WBSC Asia
Rules for classification: 1) Wins/losses; 2) Head to head; 3) Teams quality balance; 4) Earned runs team's quality balance; 5) Head to head highest batting average; 6) Coin toss
(H) Hosts

Date	Local time	Road team	Score	Home team	Inn.	Venue	Game duration	Attendance	Boxscore
30 May	15:00	South Korea	18–2	Hong Kong	5	Sai Tso Wan Recreation Ground	2:15	50	Report
30 May	18:00	Japan	12–1	Chinese Taipei	5	Sai Tso Wan Recreation Ground	1:39	102	Report
31 May	15:00	Hong Kong	0–15	Japan	4	Sai Tso Wan Recreation Ground	1:30	75	Report
31 May	18:00	South Korea	5–15	Chinese Taipei	5	Sai Tso Wan Recreation Ground	2:30	150	Report

== Third place play-off ==
1 June 2023 10:00 Sai Tso Wan Recreation Ground 27 °C (81 °F), overcast
Team	1	2	3	4	5	6	7	R	H	E
Hong Kong	1	2	0	0	1	X	X	4	4	6
South Korea (5)	3	4	2	3	2	X	X	14	11	2
WP: Sayuri Ono (2–0) LP: Yin Sum Kwong (2–2); Attendance: 100; Umpires: Show-Ling Wang (HP), Siang-Yuan Meng (1B), Laurensius Sutanto (2B), Shu-Uen Jang (3B), Hayde Bongas (LF), Jacky Leung (RF); Boxscore

== Final ==
1 June 2023 14:00 Sai Tso Wan Recreation Ground 31 °C (88 °F), sunny
Team	1	2	3	4	5	6	7	R	H	E
Chinese Taipei	0	0	0	0	0	3	0	3	8	2
Japan	0	2	2	2	0	2	X	8	12	0
WP: Akino Tanaka (1–0) LP: Chiao-Chi Lai (1–1) Sv: Mizuki Bando (1); Attendance: 268; Umpires: Jooyoun Han (HF}, Baoyi Li (1B), Kyoko Matsumoto (2B), Yen-Yi Ho (3B), Tiger Cheung (LF), Patrick Ng (RF); Boxscore

== Qualified teams ==
The following four teams from Asia qualify for the 2024 Women's Baseball World Cup.

Team	Qualified on	Previous appearances in Women's Baseball World Cup^{1}
Japan	14 February 2023	8 (2004, 2006, **2008**, **2010**, **2012**, **2014**, **2016**, **2018**)
South Korea	28 May 2023	4 (2008, 2010, 2016, 2018)
Chinese Taipei	28 May 2023	8 (2004, 2006, 2008, 2010, 2012, 2014, 2016, 2018)
Hong Kong	28 May 2023	5 (2006, 2008, 2014, 2016, 2018)

^{1} Bold indicates champions for that year. Italic indicates hosts for that year.
