= 2018 Women's Baseball World Cup =

Tournament details
- Country: United States
- Cities: Viera, Florida
- Venue: USSSA Space Coast Complex
- Dates: August 22 – August 31
- Teams: 12
- Defending champions: Japan

Final positions
- Champions: Japan (6th title)
- Runners-up: Chinese Taipei
- Third place: Canada
- Fourth place: United States

Tournament statistics
- Games played: 50
- Attendance: 17,969 (359 per game)
- All statistics correct as of August 31, 2018.

The 2018 Women's Baseball World Cup was the 8th edition of the WBSC Women's Baseball World Cup, the biennial international women's baseball world championship tournament. The competition was held in Viera, Florida in the United States from August 22 to August 31, 2018. The 2018 tournament was the first time that the United States hosted the event.

== Qualification ==
In September 2017, the Baseball Federation of Asia held the first Women’s Baseball Asian Cup, a biennial tournament to be held in odd years and serve as a qualifying tournament for the Women’s Baseball World Cup. Six teams competed in the 2017 tournament, from Chinese Taipei, Hong Kong, India, Japan, Pakistan, and South Korea. Japan won all five of their games to win the tournament and qualify for the World Cup. Chinese Taipei (2nd place), South Korea (3rd place), and Hong Kong (4th place) also qualified.

== Teams ==
For 2016, the number of qualifying teams grew from eight for its 6th edition in 2014 to twelve teams.

The following 12 teams qualified for the tournament.

Australia	6th, 2016 World Cup
Canada	2nd, 2016 World Cup
Chinese Taipei	4th, 2016 World Cup
Cuba	6th, 2016 World Cup
Dominican Republic	
Hong Kong	10th, 2016 World Cup
Japan	1st, 2016 World Cup
South Korea	6th, 2016 World Cup
Netherlands	9th, 2016 World Cup
Puerto Rico	
United States	Host Nation
Venezuela	3rd, 2016 World Cup

== Round 1 ==
=== Group A ===
Teams	W	L	Pct.	GB	RS	OIP	ORatio	RA	DIP	DRatio	TQB
Chinese Taipei ^{QUAL}	4	1	0.800	–	43	31	1.39	14	31	0.45	0.94
United States (H) ^{QUAL}	4	1	0.800	–	49	27	1.81	6	29	0.21	1.60
Venezuela ^{QUAL}	3	2	0.600	1.0	38	32	1.19	23	33	0.70	0.49
Puerto Rico ^{ELIM}	3	2	0.600	1.0	41	31	1.37	34	30	1.13	0.24
South Korea ^{ELIM}	1	4	0.200	3.0	18	31	0.58	52	29	1.79	−1.21
Netherlands ^{ELIM}	0	5	0.000	4.0	11	27	0.41	71	25	2.84	−2.43

- TPE wins tiebreak over USA (H2H)
- VEN wins tiebreak over PUR (H2H)
- QUAL = Qualified for the Super Round

=== Group B ===
Teams	W	L	Pct.	GB	RS	OIP	ORatio	RA	DIP	DRatio	TQB
Japan^{QUAL}	5	0	1.000	–	46	30	1.53	3	33	0.09	1.44
Canada^{QUAL}	4	1	0.800	1.0	42	27	1.56	16	28	0.57	0.99
Dominican Republic^{QUAL}	2	3	0.400	3.0	29	28	1.04	45	27	1.67	−0.63
Australia^{ELIM}	2	3	0.400	3.0	49	31	1.58	29	31	0.93	0.65
Cuba^{ELIM}	1	4	0.200	4.0	29	31	0.94	34	30	1.13	−0.19
Hong Kong^{ELIM}	1	4	0.000	4.0	11	27	0.41	75	26	2.88	−2.47

- DOM wins tiebreak over AUS (H2H)
- QUAL = Qualified for the Super Round

== Schedule Round 1 ==
Date	Time (EST)	Home	Runs	Away	Runs	Notes	Stadium	Location
8/22/2018	1000	Japan	8	Dominican Republic	0	WP:Taniyama, R (1–0) LP:Quero Hernandez, M (0–1)	USSSA Space Coast Stadium	Viera, Florida
8/22/2018	1000	Venezuela	1	Chinese Taipei	9	WP:Huang, C (1–0) LP:Cumana, G (0–1)	USSSA Space Sports Complex Venu II	Viera, Florida
8/22/2018	1400	Canada	4	Hong Kong	0	WP:Lavallee, A (1–0) LP:Lam, Y (0–1) 5inn./weather	USSSA Space Coast Stadium	Viera, Florida
8/22/2018	1400	Australia	-	Cuba	-	Susp-Weather B-4th – Resume @ 0900est 8/23/18	USSSA Space Sports Complex Venu II	Viera, Florida
8/22/2018	1800	United States	14	Puerto Rico	0	WP:Piagno, S (1–0) LP:Zayas Rodriguez, M (0–1) 5inn./Run Rule	USSSA Space Coast Stadium	Viera, Florida
8/22/2018	1800	Netherlands	8	South Korea	9	WP:Kim, R (1–0) LP:Jansen, B (0–1)	USSSA Space Sports Complex Venu II	Viera, Florida
8/23/2018*	0900	Australia	12	Cuba	4	WP:Neads, L (1–0) LP:Solano Castillo, M (0–1)	USSSA Space Sports Complex Venu II	Viera, Florida
8/23/2018	1000	Hong Kong	0	Japan	23	WP:Ishimura, N (1–0) LP:Ho, T (0–1) 5inn./Run Rule	USSSA Space Coast Stadium	Viera, Florida
8/23/2018	1100	South Korea	4	Venezuela	10	WP:Cortez Urquiola, M (1–0) LP:Jung, H (0–1)	USSSA Space Sports Complex Venu II	Viera, Florida
8/23/2018	1400	Dominican Republic	9	Australia	6	WP: Burgo Compres, A (1–0) LP: Tabrett, M (0–1)	USSSA Space Coast Stadium	Viera, Florida
8/23/2018	1430	Canada	10	Cuba	7	WP: Asay, A (1-0) LP:Goonzalez Pavon, I (0–1) 5inn./weather	USSSA Space Sports Complex Venu II	Viera, Florida
8/23/2018	1800	Netherlands	0	United States	18	WP: Schutte, B (1–0) LP: Bergwerff, L (0–1) 5inn./Run Rule	USSSA Space Coast Stadium	Viera, Florida
8/23/2018	1800	Chinese Taipei	6	Puerto Rico	9	WP: Valazquez, N (1–0) SV: Ramirez, N (1) LP: Hu, C (0–1)	USSSA Space Sports Complex Venu II	Viera, Florida
8/24/2018	1000	Dominican Republic	0	Cuba	12	WP: Porro Suarez, D (1–0) LP: Mercedes Cuevas, J (0–1) 5inn./Run Rule	USSSA Space Coast Stadium	Viera, Florida
8/24/2018	1000	Australia	24	Hong Kong	2	WP: Flanigan, S (1–0) LP: AU, H (0–1) 5inn./Run Rule	USSSA Space Sports Complex Venu II	Viera, Florida
8/24/2018	1645	Chinese Taipei	-	Netherlands	-	Suspended: Reschedule 08/27/18	USSSA Space Coast Stadium	Viera, Florida
8/24/2018	1645	Puerto Rico	-	Venezuela	-	Suspended: Reschedule 08/27/18	USSSA Space Sports Complex Venu II	Viera, Florida
8/24/2018	1800	United States	11	South Korea	1	WP: Whitmore, K (1–0) LP:Cho, M (0–1) 5inn./Run Rule	USSSA Space Coast Stadium	Viera, Florida
8/24/2018	1800	Japan	2	Canada	1	WP:Sato, A (1–0) SV:Tanaka, A (1) LP:Gilder, E (0–1)	USSSA Space Sports Complex Venu II	Viera, Florida
8/25/2018	0900	Chinese Taipei	13	South Korea	0	WP:Hu, C (1–1) SV:Liang, Y (1) LP:Lee, J (0–1) 5inn./Run Rule	USSSA Space Coast Stadium	Viera, Florida
8/25/2018	0900	Puerto Rico	16	Netherlands	1	WP: Rivera Ramos, A (1–0) LP:Werkman, M (0–1) 5inn./Run Rule	USSSA Space Sports Complex Venu II	Viera, Florida
8/25/2018	1200	Venezuela	1	United States	3	WP:Sementelli, M (1–0) SV:Meidlinger, M (1) LP:Viscaya Hernandez, K (0–1)	USSSA Space Coast Stadium	Viera, Florida
8/25/2018	1200	Hong Kong	1	Dominican Republic	19	WP: Minier Vargas, C (1–0) LP:Fung, T (0–1) 5inn./Run Rule	USSSA Space Sports Complex Venu II	Viera, Florida
8/25/2018	1800	Cuba	1	Japan	4	WP: Sakahara, A (1–0) SV:Tamiyama, R(1) LP:Perez Vega, M (0–1)	USSSA Space Coast Stadium	Viera, Florida
8/25/2018	1800	Australia	6	Canada	9	WP: Lavallee, A (2–0) LP:Tabrett, M (0–2)	USSSA Space Sports Complex Venu II	Viera, Florida
8/26/2018	0900	Venezuela	17	Netherlands	1	WP:Aguilarte Lander, L (1–0) LP:Haak, M(0-1)	USSSA Space Coast Stadium	Viera, Florida
8/26/2018	0900	South Korea	4	Puerto Rico	10	WP:Ramirez, N (1–0) SV:Garcia Gonzalez, A(1) LP:Kim, B (0–1)	USSSA Space Sports Complex Venu II	Viera, Florida
8/26/2018	1200	Canada	12	Dominican Republic	1	WP:Carr, E (1–0) LP:Quero Hernandez, M (0–2)	USSSA Space Coast Stadium	Viera, Florida
8/26/2018	1200	Cuba	5	Hong Kong	8	WP:Hung, Y (1–0) LP:Porro Suarez, D (1–1)	USSSA Space Sports Complex Venu II	Viera, Florida
8/26/2018	1800	United States	3	Chinese Taipei	4	WP:Huang, C (2–0) LP:Cobb, S (0–1)	USSSA Space Coast Stadium	Viera, Florida
8/26/2018	1800	Japan	5	Australia	1	WP:Shimizu, M (1–0) LP:Hepburn, B (0–1)	USSSA Space Sports Complex Venu II	Viera, Florida
8/27/2018**	1100	Chinese Taipei	11	Netherlands	1	WP:Hu, C (2–1) LP:Bergwerff, L (0–1) 5inn./Run Rule	USSSA Space Coast Stadium	Viera, Florida
8/27/2018**	1100	Puerto Rico	6	Venezuela	9	WP:Cumana, G (1–0) LP:Paradizo Ramos, A (0–1)	USSSA Space Sports Complex Venu II	Viera, Florida

- *Completion of 8/22/18 suspended game
- **Reschedule of 8/24/18 cancelled game

=== Standings Round 2 ===
Teams	W	L	Pct.	GB	RS	OIP	ORatio	RA	DIP	DRatio	TQB
Japan	5	0	1.000	–	15	24	0.63	2	28	0.07	0.56
Chinese Taipei	4	1	0.800	1	16	29	0.55	7	28	0.25	0.30
United States	3	2	0.600	2	11	28	0.39	9	28	0.32	0.07
Canada	2	3	0.400	3	25	24	1.04	8	25	0.32	0.72
Venezuela	1	4	0.200	4	14	27	0.52	19	26	0.73	−0.21
Dominican Republic	0	5	0.000	5	4	26	0.15	40	24	1.67	−1.52

- Each team comes into Round 2 carrying the record earned in Round 1 against teams that qualified for Round 2
- USA wins tiebreak over CAN (H2H)

=== Schedule Round 2 ===
Super Round

Date	Time (EST)	Home	Runs	Away	Runs	Notes	Stadium	Location
8/28/2018	09:00	Dominican Republic	1	Chinese Taipei	2	WP:Hseih, Y (1–0) LP:Burgos Compres, A (1–1)	USSSA Space Coast Stadium	Viera, Florida
8/28/2018	13:00	Canada	5	Venezuela	0	WP:Asay, A (2–0) LP:Rengel Lopez, E (0–1)	USSSA Space Coast Stadium	Viera, Florida
8/28/2018	18:00	Japan	3	United States	0	WP:Sato, A (2–0) LP:Piagno, S (1–1)	USSSA Space Coast Stadium	Viera, Florida
8/29/2018	09:00	Venezuela	12	Dominican Republic	2	WP: Segovia Alvarado, P (1–0) LP:Mercedes Cuevas, J (0–2)	USSSA Space Coast Stadium	Viera, Florida
8/29/2018	13:00	Chinese Taipei	1	Japan	2	WP:Hu, C (2–2) LP:Tsuru, A (1–0)	USSSA Space Coast Stadium	Viera, Florida
8/29/2018	18:00	United States	5	Canada	1	WP:Sementelli, M (2–0) LP:Lavallee, A (2–1)	USSSA Space Coast Stadium	Viera, Florida
8/30/2018	09:00	Japan	10	Venezuela	0	WP:Ishimura, N (2–0) LP:Vizcaya Hernandez, K (0–2) 5inn./Run Rule	USSSA Space Coast Stadium	Viera, Florida
8/30/2018	13:00	Canada	4	Chinese Taipei	6	WP:Huang, C (3–0) LP:Martensen, H (0–1)	USSSA Space Coast Stadium	Viera, Florida
8/30/2018	18:00	Dominican Republic	1	United States	8	WP:Whitmore, K (2–0) SV:Tsujikawa, E(1) LP:Quero Hernandez, M (0–3)	USSSA Space Coast Stadium	Viera, Florida

== Round 3 ==
=== Bronze Medal ===
31 August 2018	Canada	8–5 (F/10)	United States	USSSA Space Coast Stadium, Viera, Florida
31 August 2018		Boxscore		USSSA Space Coast Stadium, Viera, Florida

=== Gold Medal ===
31 August 2018	Chinese Taipei	0–6	Japan	USSSA Space Coast Stadium, Viera, Florida
31 August 2018		Boxscore		USSSA Space Coast Stadium, Viera, Florida

== Final standings ==
Rk	Team	W	L
1	Japan	9	0
Lost in the final
2	Chinese Taipei	6	3
Failed to qualify for final
3	Canada	6	3
4	United States	6	3
Failed to qualify for medal games
5	Venezuela	4	4
6	Dominican Republic	2	6
7	Australia	5	3
8	Cuba	4	4
9	Puerto Rico	4	4
10	South Korea	2	6
11	Hong Kong	2	6
12	Netherlands	0	8

2018 Women's Baseball World champions

Japan
6th title
