= Thailand women's national baseball team =

Information
- Country: Thailand
- Federation: Baseball Association of Thailand
- Confederation: Baseball Federation of Asia

WBSC ranking
- Current: 19 (31 December 2024)

Women's Asian Cup
- Appearances: 1 (first in 2023)

The Thailand women's national baseball team represents Thailand in international women's baseball competitions. The team is organized by the Baseball Association of Thailand (BBAT) and is a member of the Baseball Federation of Asia (BFA).

== History ==
The Thailand women's national team played in the 2023 Asian Cup Qualifiers, finishing 2nd in Group A with an 8–9 loss to India and an 11–3 win over Malaysia.

Thailand hosted the 2025 Asian Cup Qualifiers, where they finished 4th to qualify for the 2025 Asian Cup.

== Results and fixtures ==
=== 2025 ===
Asia Cup Qualifiers	April 23	Thailand	12–1 (F/5)	Malaysia	Queen Sirikit's 60th Anniversary Stadium, Thailand
Asia Cup Qualifiers	15:00

Asia Cup Qualifiers	April 24	Cambodia	2–18 (F/4)	Thailand	Queen Sirikit's 60th Anniversary Stadium, Thailand

Asia Cup Qualifiers	April 25	Thailand	13–14	Indonesia	Queen Sirikit's 60th Anniversary Stadium, Thailand

Asia Cup Qualifiers	April 27	Thailand	8–1	Pakistan	Queen Sirikit's 60th Anniversary Stadium, Thailand
Asia Cup Qualifiers	14:00

Asia Cup Qualifiers	April 28	India	6–5	Thailand	Queen Sirikit's 60th Anniversary Stadium, Thailand

Asia Cup Qualifiers	April 29	Thailand	1–5	Pakistan	Queen Sirikit's 60th Anniversary Stadium, Thailand
Asia Cup Qualifiers	14:00

2025 Asian Cup	October 26	Thailand	2–19 (F/4)	China	Guali Field, China

2025 Asian Cup	October 28	Thailand	6–3	India	Guali Field, China

2025 Asian Cup	October 29	Chinese Taipei	27–1 (F/4)	Thailand	Guali Field, China

2025 Asian Cup	October 30	Hong Kong	18–8 (F/5)	Thailand	Guali Field, China

2025 Asian Cup	October 30	Thailand	10–16	Indonesia	Guali Field, China

== See also ==
- Thailand national baseball team
