= 2025 Women's Baseball Asian Cup =

Tournament details
- Country: China
- City: Hangzhou
- Dates: 26 October – 2 November
- Teams: 10 (from 1 confederation)
- Defending champions: Japan

Final positions
- Champions: Japan (4th title)
- Runners-up: Chinese Taipei
- Third place: Hong Kong
- Fourth place: South Korea

Tournament statistics
- Best BA: (Japan) Yuria Hatanaka (.789)
- Most HRs: (Chinese Taipei) Yi-Hsuan Chu (Chinese Taipei) Pei-Chen Huang (2)
- Most SBs: (China) Jie Lie (South Korea) Jua Park (9)
- Most Ks (as pitcher): (Japan) Sawa Kashizaki (15)

The 2025 Women's Baseball Asian Cup was the fourth edition of the Women's Baseball Asian Cup, held in Hangzhou, China.

== Teams ==
Six teams directly qualified for the main tournament. They were joined by the top four teams from the qualifier tournament hosted in Thailand.

Main tournament

- China (H)
- Chinese Taipei
- Hong Kong
- Japan
- South Korea
- Philippines

Additional teams from the qualifiers

- Indonesia
- India
- ~~Pakistan~~
- Sri Lanka (replacing Pakistan)
- Thailand

== Qualifier round ==
2025 Women's Baseball Asian Cup Qualifier
Tournament details
- Country: Thailand
- Dates: 23 – 29 April
- Teams: 8

=== Group A ===
Pos	Team	Pld	W	L	RF	RA	RD	PCT	GB	Qualification
1	India	3	3	0	29	5	+24	1.000	—	Super round and main tournament
2	Pakistan	3	2	1	28	9	+19	.667	1	Super round and main tournament
3	Sri Lanka	3	1	2	22	24	−2	.333	2	Placement round
4	Iran	3	0	3	2	43	−41	.000	3	Placement round

Source: WBSC Asia

Date	Local time	Road team	Score	Home team	Inn.	Venue	Game duration	Attendance	Boxscore
Apr 23	11:00	Sri Lanka	4–14	India	5		2:23	60	Report
Apr 24	11:30	Iran	0–13	Sri Lanka	5		1:56	50	Report
Apr 24	14:00	Pakistan	1–2	India	9		2:21	80	Report
Apr 25	9:00	Iran	2–17	Pakistan	4		1:47	50	Report
Apr 25	11:30	India	13–0	Iran	5		2:09	20	Report
Apr 25	11:30	Sri Lanka	5–10	Pakistan	7		1:51	45	Report

=== Group B ===
Pos	Team	Pld	W	L	RF	RA	RD	PCT	GB	Qualification
1	Indonesia	3	3	0	49	13	+36	1.000	—	Super round and main tournament
2	Thailand (H)	3	2	1	43	17	+26	.667	1	Super round and main tournament
3	Malaysia	3	1	2	18	33	−15	.333	2	Placement round
4	Cambodia	3	0	3	8	55	−47	.000	3	Placement round

Source: WBSC Asia
(H) Hosts

Date	Local time	Road team	Score	Home team	Inn.	Venue	Game duration	Attendance	Boxscore
23 April	11:00	Indonesia	20–0	Cambodia	4		1:52	80	Report
23 April	18:00	Thailand	12–1	Malaysia	5		1:39	100	Report
24 April	12:00	Thailand	18–2	Cambodia	4		1:53	60	Report
24 April	12:00	Malaysia	0–15	Indonesia	4		1:53	88	Report
25 April	12:00	Cambodia	6–17	Malaysia	5		2:16	60	Report
25 April	17:00	Indonesia	14–13	Thailand	7		3:02	95	Report

=== Semifinals ===
==== Placement round ====
Pos	Team	Pld	W	L	RF	RA	RD	PCT
5	Sri Lanka	3	3	0	57	13	+44	1.000
6	Malaysia	3	2	1	37	26	+11	.667
7	Cambodia	3	1	2	37	58	−21	.333
8	Iran	3	0	3	17	51	−34	.000

Source: WBSC Asia

Date	Local time	Road team	Score	Home team	Inn.	Venue	Game duration	Attendance	Boxscore
Apr 27	10:00	Cambodia	23–13	Iran	6		4:00	60	Report
Apr 27	14:00	Sri Lanka	16–5	Malaysia	7		2:49	40	Report
Apr 28	10:00	Iran	4–15	Malaysia	5		2:33	50	Report
Apr 28	14:00	Cambodia	8–28	Sri Lanka	4		2:11	61	Report

==== Super round ====
Pos	Team	Pld	W	L	RF	RA	RD	PCT	GB	Qualification
1	Indonesia	3	3	0	25	21	+4	1.000	—	Final
2	India	3	2	1	11	11	0	.667	1	Final
3	Thailand (H)	3	1	2	26	21	+5	.333	2	Bronze medal game
4	Pakistan	3	0	3	7	16	−9	.000	3	Bronze medal game

Source: WBSC Asia
(H) Hosts

Date	Local time	Road team	Score	Home team	Inn.	Venue	Game duration	Attendance	Boxscore
Apr 27	10:00	India	3–5	Indonesia	7				Report
Apr 27	14:00	Pakistan	1–8	Thailand	7		1:56	155	Report
Apr 28	10:00	Pakistan	5–6	Indonesia	7		2:00	60	Report
Apr 28	14:00	Thailand	5–6	India	7		2:09	300	Report

=== Third place play-off ===
29 April 2025 13:00 Bangkok 28 °C (82 °F), sunny
Team	1	2	3	4	5	6	7	R	H	E
Pakistan	0	1	2	1	1	0	0	5	5	0
Thailand	1	0	0	0	0	0	0	1	4	4
Attendance: 150; Boxscore

=== Final ===
29 April 2025 13:00 Bangkok 34 °C (93 °F), cloudy
Team	1	2	3	4	5	6	7	R	H	E
India	0	1	0	0	2	0	1	4	6	0
Indonesia	2	0	0	0	1	0	2	5	7	1
Attendance: 198; Boxscore

== Main tournament ==
Japan won its fourth consecutive continental tournament, going undefeated. Chinese Taipei again finished second, with Hong Kong finishing third.

=== Opening round ===
==== Group A ====
Pos	Team	Pld	W	L	RF	RA	RD	PCT	GB	Qualification
1	Chinese Taipei	4	4	0	70	3	+67	1.000	—	Super round
2	Hong Kong	4	3	1	46	27	+19	.750	1	Super round
3	China (H)	4	2	2	47	42	+5	.500	2	5th place play-off
4	Thailand	4	1	3	17	67	−50	.250	3	7th place play-off
5	India	4	0	4	9	50	−41	.000	4	9th place play-off

Source: WBSC Asia
(H) Hosts

Date	Local time	Road team	Score	Home team	Inn.	Venue	Game duration	Attendance	Boxscore
26 October	12:00	Hong Kong	2–13	Chinese Taipei	5	Guali Baseball Field	1:42	98	Boxscore
26 October	18:30	Thailand	2–19	China	4	Guali Baseball Field	2:13	410	Boxscore
27 October	9:00	India	0–10	Chinese Taipei	6	Guali Baseball Field	1:53	65	Boxscore
27 October	18:30	China	5–15	Hong Kong	4	Guali Baseball Field	2:44	588	Boxscore
28 October	12:00	Thailand	6–3	India	7	Guali Baseball Field	2:21	120	Boxscore
28 October	18:30	Chinese Taipei	20–0	China	4	Guali Baseball Field	2:17	216	Boxscore
29 October	12:00	India	1–11	Hong Kong	5	Guali Baseball Field	1:52	68	Boxscore
29 October	18:30	Chinese Taipei	27–1	Thailand	4	Guali Baseball Field	1:48	188	Boxscore
30 October	12:00	Hong Kong	18–8	Thailand	5	Guali Baseball Field	2:46	88	Boxscore
30 October	18:30	China	23–5	India	4	Guali Baseball Field	2:33	168	Boxscore

==== Group B ====
Pos	Team	Pld	W	L	RF	RA	RD	PCT	GB	Qualification
1	Japan	4	4	0	93	2	+91	1.000	—	Super round
2	South Korea	4	3	1	39	18	+21	.750	1	Super round
3	Philippines	4	2	2	26	29	−3	.500	2	5th place play-off
4	Indonesia	4	1	3	30	65	−35	.250	3	7th place play-off
5	Sri Lanka	4	0	4	4	78	−74	.000	4	9th place play-off

Source: WBSC Asia

Date	Local time	Road team	Score	Home team	Inn.	Venue	Game duration	Attendance	Boxscore
26 October	9:00	Japan	31–0	Sri Lanka	4	Guali Baseball Field	1:28	89	Boxscore
26 October	15:00	South Korea	5–1	Philippines	7	Guali Baseball Field	2:27	388	Boxscore
27 October	12:00	Indonesia	3–17	South Korea	5	Guali Baseball Field	2:14	128	Boxscore
27 October	15:00	Philippines	0–15	Japan	4	Guali Baseball Field	1:34	86	Boxscore
28 October	9:00	Sri Lanka	3–18	Indonesia	4	Guali Baseball Field	1:51	50	Boxscore
28 October	15:00	Japan	13–2	South Korea	6	Guali Baseball Field	2:00	88	Boxscore
29 October	9:00	Philippines	11–9	Indonesia	7	Guali Baseball Field	2:39	120	Boxscore
29 October	15:00	South Korea	15–1	Sri Lanka	5	Guali Baseball Field	1:48	30	Boxscore
30 October	9:00	Sri Lanka	0–14	Philippines	5	Guali Baseball Field	1:46	66	Boxscore
30 October	15:00	Indonesia	0–34	Japan	4	Guali Baseball Field	1:57	166	Boxscore

=== Placement round ===
==== Ninth place play-off ====
1 November 2025 9:00 Huangzhou 16 °C (61 °F), raining
Team	1	2	3	4	5	6	7	R	H	E
India	0	1	0	0	5	4	2	12	8	3
Sri Lanka	2	1	0	1	0	4	0	8	9	7
Attendance: 78; Boxscore

==== Seventh place play-off ====
31 October 2025 12:00 Huangzhou 18 °C (64 °F), drizzling
Team	1	2	3	4	5	6	7	R	H	E
Thailand	0	0	4	1	1	4	0	10	14	4
Indonesia	3	1	5	0	0	7	X	16	10	1
Attendance: 50; Boxscore

==== Fifth place play-off ====
1 November 2025 12:00 Huangzhou 20 °C (68 °F), sunny
Team	1	2	3	4	5	6	7	R	H	E
Philippines	0	0	1	2	1	0	4	8	12	6
China	1	4	2	4	2	0	0	13	12	2
Attendance: 104; Boxscore

=== Super round ===
Pos	Team	Pld	W	L	RF	RA	RD	PCT	GB	Qualification
1	Japan	3	3	0	37	6	+31	1.000	—	Final
2	Chinese Taipei	3	2	1	25	22	+3	.667	1	Final
3	South Korea	3	1	2	22	24	−2	.333	2	Bronze medal game
4	Hong Kong	3	0	3	5	37	−32	.000	3	Bronze medal game

Source: WBSC Asia

Date	Local time	Road team	Score	Home team	Inn.	Venue	Game duration	Attendance	Boxscore
31 October	15:00	South Korea	14–3	Hong Kong	6	Guali Baseball Field	2:07	66	Boxscore
31 October	18:30	Chinese Taipei	4–14	Japan	6	Guali Baseball Field	2:20	180	Boxscore
1 November	15:00	Hong Kong	0–10	Japan	5	Guali Baseball Field	1:33	98	Boxscore
1 November	18:30	South Korea	6–8	Chinese Taipei	7	Guali Baseball Field	2:49	368	Boxscore

==== Third place play-off ====
2 November 2025 14:00 Huangzhou 23 °C (73 °F), sunny
Team	1	2	3	4	5	6	7	R	H	E
Hong Kong	2	0	0	0	3	0	1	6	8	1
South Korea	3	0	2	0	0	0	0	5	5	2
Attendance: 148; Boxscore

==== Final ====
2 November 2025 18:01 Huangzhou 19 °C (66 °F), clear
Team	1	2	3	4	5	6	7	R	H	E
Chinese Taipei	0	0	0	0	0	0	0	0	5	3
Japan	7	0	0	0	0	1	X	8	8	0
Attendance: 460; Boxscore

== Final standing ==
Rank	Team
1st place, gold medalist(s)	Japan
2nd place, silver medalist(s)	Chinese Taipei
3rd place, bronze medalist(s)	Hong Kong
4	South Korea
5	China
6	Philippines
7	Indonesia
8	Thailand
9	India
10	Sri Lanka

Qualified for the 2027 World Cup
Qualified for the 2027 World Cup as wildcard
