= Women's Baseball World Series =

Baseball competition

- Sport: Baseball
- Founded: 2001
- No. of teams: 8 (in 2004)
- Continent: International
- Most recent champion: Orlando Heat
- Most titles: Japan (2 titles)

The Women's Baseball World Series was an international tournament in which originally national women's baseball teams from around the world competed, before being overtaken by the Women's Baseball World Cup in 2004. It was sanctioned by the International Baseball Federation.

== History ==
Competitive international women's baseball began when Japan sent a nationally selected squad, sponsored by a sports drink company named Team Energen, to Florida to participate in the North American Women's Baseball League’s 1999 South Florida Diamond Classic.

At the 1999 South Florida Diamond Classic, Team Energen showed that they could play at the top level of women's baseball. After a meeting between Japanese and American officials following the tournament, plans were initiated for a contest between a national women's baseball team from the United States and Team Energen in Tokyo. In May 2000, a United States national women's baseball team flew to Tokyo and played the first competitive international women's baseball game on May 1 in the Seibu Dome against a nationally selected Team Energen squad. The Japanese team defeated the US team in front of 3,000 enthusiastic fans. Organisers were impressed at the success of the game and decided to organise an annual competition called the Women's World Series to be held in the United States or Canada in the summer of 2001. After discussions over the summer with women's baseball program organisers within the AWBF, Baseball Ontario, the Baseball Victoria (Australia) and the Baseball Federation of Japan plans were developed for the 2001 Women's World Series in Toronto.

The Toronto Blue Jays agreed that several games including the championship game of the 2001 Women's World Series would be played in the Toronto SkyDome. This proved to be an irresistible venue for attracting Japanese and Australian teams to North America. Australia selected their national women's team from a tryout process woven into their women's first Australian women's national baseball championship. The Australian Baseball Federation selected and trained the team which entered the 2001 Women's World Series. Baseball Canada also selected and trained a women's national team in 2001. Canada dropped out of international competitions after a disappointing fourth-place finish and did not resume play until the 2004 Women's World Series in Uozu City, Japan.

The American Women's Baseball Federation (AWBF) with the help of the Roy Hobbs Baseball organization selected and organized the 2001 United States team through tryouts held in several areas of the country. A team ranging in ages from 15 to 41 represented the United States well eventually winning the inaugural 2001 Women's World Series.

The 2002 Women's World Series was played in St. Petersburg, Florida with Japan, Australia and the United States entering teams. In the gold medal game played at Tropicana Field following a Major League Baseball game Australia defeated Japan 7–4.

The 2003 Women's World Series was hosted by Australia and was played August 25–30 on the Gold Coast in Queensland at the Australian Baseball Federation national training site, Palm Meadows Baseball Complex. Japan was to host the 2003 event originally, but the SARS virus closed that venue in June 2003. Teams from the United States, Australia and Japan accepted. Japan won the 2003 Women's World Series defeating Australia 4–2.

Following the 2003 Women's World Series representatives from the three countries met to discuss whether the 2004 Women's World Series would be rescheduled because of the newly sanctioned IBAF 2004 Women's Baseball World Cup. The three country representatives and the IBAF agreed to reschedule the event for July 16–23, 2004 as to honor commitments to the World Cup.

Eight teams played in the 2004 Women's World Series. The event would not solely be successful, but also see new teams from Korea, India, Hong Kong and Chinese Taipei (Taiwan). In the final, Japan defeated the USA 14–4 in front of almost 10,000 spectators.

In 2005 and 2006, the World Series was a North American competition held in the Disney's Wide World of Sports Complex open to any women's teams, as it was overshadowed by the now more successful and internationally recognised World Cup.

== See also ==
- Women's Baseball World Cup
- Women's baseball
- Baseball awards § World
