= 2021 Women's Baseball World Cup =

Cancelled baseball tournament

Tournament details
- Country: Mexico
- City: Tijuana
- Dates: Cancelled
- Teams: 12
- Defending champions: Japan

The 2021 Women's Baseball World Cup would have been the ninth edition of the WBSC Women's Baseball World Cup, the biennial international women's baseball world championship tournament. The competition was planned to be held in Tijuana, Mexico in late 2021, with dates to be announced. The competition was originally to be held in Monterrey, Mexico from 11 to 20 September 2020, and was initially rescheduled to be held in Tijuana from 1 to 9 March 2021, but was postponed both times due to the COVID-19 pandemic. The tournament was cancelled altogether in October 2021.

Four national teams, hosts Mexico, China, France, and the Philippines were scheduled to debut in the tournament.

== Qualification ==
Event	Date	Location	Vacancies	Qualified
Pan American Women's Baseball Championship	22–31 August 2018	(Mexico) Aguascalientes	4	United States; Canada; Venezuela; Mexico
2019 Women's European Baseball Championship	31 July – 3 August 2019	(France) Rouen	1	France
2019 Women's Baseball Asian Cup	9–15 November 2019	(China) Zhongshan	~~4~~ 3	Japan; Chinese Taipei; Philippines; ~~China~~
Oceania qualifier	–	–	1	Australia
Wild card	–	–	~~2~~ 3	Cuba; Dominican Republic; Netherlands
Total			12	
