= Amanda Asay =

Canadian baseball and ice hockey player (1988–2022)

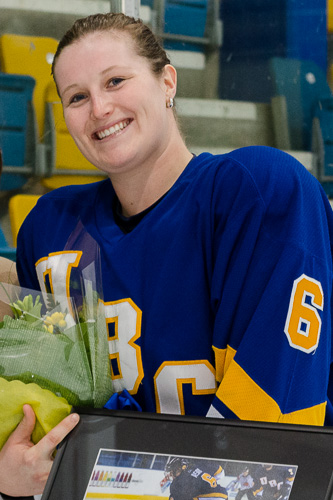
- Asay before a UBC Thunderbirds women's hockey game in 2012

Personal information
- Full name: Amanda Karlene Asay
- Born: May 16, 1988 Prince George, British Columbia, Canada
- Died: January 7, 2022 (aged 33) Nelson, British Columbia, Canada

Sport
- Sport: Baseball, ice hockey
- College team: Brown Bears; UBC Thunderbirds
Medal record
Women's baseball
Representing Canada
Women's Baseball World Cup
Bronze medal – third place	2006 Taiwan	Team competition
Silver medal – second place	2008 Japan	Team competition
Bronze medal – third place	2012 Canada	Team competition
Silver medal – second place	2016 South Korea	Team competition
Bronze medal – third place	2018 United States	Team competition
Pan American Games
Silver medal – second place	2015 Toronto	Team competition

Amanda Karlene Asay (May 16, 1988 – January 7, 2022) was a Canadian baseball and ice hockey player. She was on the Canada women's national baseball team from 2005 to 2021 and was its longest-serving member at the time of her death. She batted and threw right-handed, and played at catcher, first base, and starting pitcher.

Asay joined the national team when she was 17 years old. She played in the World Cup one year later, when she was named to the all-tournament team as first baseman and won the national team's Most Valuable Player (MVP) award. She competed in six more World Cup tournaments, earning two silver and three bronze medals. She was also part of the team that won a silver medal at the 2015 Pan American Games. At the 2016 World Cup, she played as a pitcher, won both her starts by pitching complete games, and again won the team MVP award.

After Asay died in a skiing accident in 2022, Baseball Canada retired her jersey number in her honour at a memorial game. She was inducted into the BC Sports Hall of Fame and the Canadian Baseball Hall of Fame in 2024 and 2025, respectively.

== Early life and education ==
Born in Prince George, British Columbia on May 16, 1988, to parents Loris and George, Amanda Asay was raised with her brother, Brad. Her father worked as a high school science teacher; her mother was a nurse. Asay began playing baseball when she was five competing for Prince George East in Little League Baseball, a local boys baseball league, and the Prince George Knights rep team. In hockey, Asay developed her skills in the Northern Cougars female program before transferring to the boys Tier One House.

Asay attended College Heights Secondary School in her hometown where she graduated with honours. She then studied at Brown University on an academic and hockey scholarship, graduating with a Bachelor of Science in 2010. She completed postgraduate studies at the University of British Columbia under the supervision of Suzanne Simard, obtaining a Master of Science in 2013 with a focus on forestry and a Doctor of Philosophy in forestry in 2020. Her research concentrated on kin selection and recognition in interior Douglas fir, as well as the involvement of mycorrhizal networks in that interaction.

== Playing career ==
=== Collegiate ===
==== Brown University, 2007–2010 ====
Asay competed in softball for Brown University from 2007 to 2010 playing as first baseman, outfielder, and designated hitter. She was a right-handed thrower and batter. In her first season, she had the most runs batted in (RBIs) on the team with 16, along with 20 hits and 8 runs scored in 42 games played. Asay was limited to eight games the following year due to an injury that prematurely ended her season, but maintained a .435 batting average with 10 hits and six RBIs. Her 2009 season was also shortened to six games because of another season-ending injury. Asay had 10 hits, two home runs, six RBIs, and six runs scored in 13 at bats. She served as team captain during her senior year.

Asay also played on the Brown Bears women's ice hockey team. She missed only one game during the first hockey season in 2006–07 to receive the Canadian women's baseball player of the year award. During her second year, she played 19 games as defenceman and had nine shots. She sat out a season of play due to an ankle injury. With the Bears she played 62 games and recorded seven points.

==== University of British Columbia, 2010–2012 ====
Asay competed in women's ice hockey with the University of British Columbia Thunderbirds from 2010 to 2012, playing as a forward. She played 48 games and recorded 20 points. During the 2010–11 Thunderbirds season, she scored 6 goals and contributed 5 assists for 11 points. She also played in the South Coast Senior Women's 'AA' Hockey League for the Northern Penguins team.

=== Canada national baseball team ===
Asay joined the Canada national team in 2005. One year later, she made her World Cup debut at the tournament in Taiwan and helped the team win bronze. Asay was a first baseman, designated hitter, and backup as catcher. She had a .500 batting average and nine RBIs, leading to her being named to the tournament all-star team as first baseman and winning the national team's MVP award. Later that year, she was a finalist for the Tip O'Neill Award, given by the Canadian Baseball Hall of Fame to the top Canadian player of the year.

Asay competed in six more editions of the World Cup, helping the Canadian team earn silver in 2008 and 2016, and bronze in 2012 and 2018. During the 2016 tournament, she was a starting pitcher and won her two starts by pitching complete games. She posted a 1.00 earned run average (ERA) and 16 strikeouts. Offensively, she had a .333 batting average with two doubles and three RBIs. She was honoured as the team's MVP of the tournament for the second time.

In 2015, Asay was chosen for the Canadian roster at the 2015 Pan American Games as a first baseman and pitcher. It was the first edition of a major multi-sport event to feature women's baseball. The team advanced to the gold medal match of the women's tournament, losing 11–3 against the United States. She pitched 2 2/3 innings in relief and recorded an RBI in the final.

In 2016, Asay was again a finalist for the Tip O'Neill Award and won the national team's MVP award. Baseball America ranked her as the seventh-best female baseball player in the world in August 2017. She was the only Canadian to be listed in the Top 10. In 2020, Baseball Canada honoured her with the Ashley Stephenson Award for her leadership on the 2019 team. At the time of her death, Asay was the longest-serving member of the Canadian team, having played for 16 years.

=== Professional baseball ===
For the 2017–2018 season, Asay played professional baseball for the Footscray Bulldogs in Melbourne, Australia. She also played in the Prince George Senior Men's Baseball League (PGSMBL) for the Red Sox team as their starting pitcher. In 2014, she won the league's Top Pitcher award.

== Personal life and death ==
Asay appeared alongside her supervisor Suzanne Simard in the documentary film Intelligent Trees. She was employed as a forester for the Ministry of Forests, Lands, Natural Resources and Rural Development in Nelson, British Columbia. She played hockey there in the winter of 2021–22. Asay died on January 7, 2022, at the age of 33, at Kootenay Lake Hospital in Nelson. She had fallen into a tree well while skiing at the nearby Whitewater Ski Resort.

== Tributes and legacy ==
Two months after her death, the Prince George Community Foundation created the Dr. Amanda Asay Memorial Award in her honour. It is presented annually to two post-secondary school students, one from School District 57 in her hometown and the other from School District 8 in Nelson. In May 2022, Baseball Canada retired her jersey number 19 from the women's national baseball program. Two months later, the Canadian women's baseball team wore a patch bearing the word "Ace", Asay's nickname, on the right sleeve of their jersey in a series of games against the United States.

Baseball Canada organised a memorial game in her honour in September 2022. In 2024, she was inducted into the BC Sports Hall of Fame and the following year she was inducted into the Canadian Baseball Hall of Fame.
