= Philippines women's national baseball team =

Information
- Country: Philippines
- Federation: Philippine Amateur Baseball Association
- Confederation: WBSC Asia

WBSC ranking
- Current: 11 ▲10 (9 September 2026)

Women's World Cup
- Appearances: 1 (first in 2027)
- Best result: Group stage

Women's Asian Cup
- Appearances: 3 (first in 2019)
- Best result: (bronze) 3rd (1 time, in 2019)

The Philippines women's national baseball team is the national team of the Philippines which represents the country in women's baseball. It is organized by the Philippine Amateur Baseball Association (PABA).

== History ==
There was a rejected proposal by the Philippines to adopt women's baseball back in the 1923 Far Eastern Championship Games in Osaka, Japan. It was not held due to the lack of popularity of baseball among women in Japan and the Republic of China.

The Philippine Amateur Baseball Association began the process for forming the Philippine women's national baseball in 2018. PABA conducted tryouts with some of the players of the team also softball players. They debuted in competitive baseball at the 2019 Women's Baseball Asian Cup with only around half-a-year of preparations which involves scrimmages against local Philippine high school and college men's teams. They finished third in the tournament clinching a qualification berth for their first Women's Baseball World Cup in 2020.

The Philippines was also supposed to play at the 2019 SEA Games to be hosted at home, but women's baseball was scrapped from the regional games' calendar due to Indonesia being the only other country to signify interest to enter a women's baseball event at the games.

The national team was supposed to play in 2020 at the Women's Baseball World Cup. However the tournament was postponed due to the COVID-19 pandemic. Initially planning to train in Japan and participate in tournaments in Hong Kong as part of the team's preparation for the World Cup, their training was modified due to logistical issues caused by the pandemic. Team members had to resort to online means and train individually.

The Philippines was given a wild card for the 2027 Women's Baseball World Cup. They took part in the Group Tainan tournament in August 2026 and finished with a 2–3 win-lose record and failed to advance to the final round scheduled for next year.

== Tournament record ==
=== Women's Baseball World Cup ===
The Philippines was to make its first appearance at the Women's Baseball World Cup in its second edition after it finished third in the 2019 Women's Baseball Asian Cup where the top four teams qualified for the tournament.

Women's Baseball World Cup record
Year	Round	Position	Pld	W	L	RS	RA
(Mexico) 2021	—N/a	Qualified but cancelled					
(Canada) 2024	—N/a	Did not qualify					
(Chinese Taipei) (United States) 2027	Group stage	4th in Group	5	2	3	14	23
Total	—	—					

=== Women's Baseball Asian Cup ===
The Philippine national team debuted in the Women's Baseball Asian Cup in the 2019 edition. It is also their very first international competition. Aiming a podium finish, the Philippines won their first competitive fixture in the opening round with them prevailing 12–3 against Hong Kong. They advanced to the Super round after securing a win against South Korea. In the Super Round, the Philippines conceded matches against Japan and Chinese Taipei, but won over host, China. Their finishing set up a rematch with the China in the bronze medal match with the Philippines clinching a 11–1 win over the hosts.

Champions Runners up Third place Fourth place

Women's Baseball Asian Cup
Year	Round	Position	Pld	W	L	RS	RA
(Hong Kong) 2017	Did not participate						
(China) 2019	Third place	3rd	6	4	2	45	46
(Hong Kong) 2023	Classification round	5th	5	3	2	45	20
(China) 2025	Placement Game 5th-6th	6th	5	2	3	34	42
Total	Third place	3/4	16	9	7	124	108

== See also ==
- Philippines men's national baseball team
- Philippines men's national softball team
- Philippines women's national softball team
