= 2017 Women's Baseball Asian Cup =

Tournament details
- Country: Hong Kong
- Dates: 2 – 7 September
- Teams: 6

Final positions
- Champions: Japan (1st title)
- Runners-up: Chinese Taipei
- Third place: South Korea
- Fourth place: Hong Kong

The 2017 Women's Baseball Asian Cup is the inaugural competition of the Women's Baseball Asian Cup. It was held at the Sai Tso Wan Baseball Field in Hong Kong from 2 to 7 September 2017. The tournament followed a single round robin format. The top four teams qualifies for the 2018 Women's Baseball World Cup in the United States.

Japan despite fielding only players under-18 years old, clinched the inaugural title.

== Teams ==
- Chinese Taipei
- Hong Kong (Hosts)
- India
- Japan
- South Korea
- Pakistan

== Results ==
| Pos | Team | Pld | W | L | RF | RA | RD | PCT | GB | Final Result |
|---|---|---|---|---|---|---|---|---|---|---|
| 1 | Japan | 5 | 5 | 0 | 53 | 1 | +52 | 1.000 | — | Champions |
| 2 | Chinese Taipei | 5 | 4 | 1 | 60 | 8 | +52 | .800 | 1 | Runners-up |
| 3 | South Korea | 5 | 3 | 2 | 41 | 33 | +8 | .600 | 2 | 3rd place |
| 4 | Hong Kong (H) | 5 | 2 | 3 | 40 | 34 | +6 | .400 | 3 | |
| 5 | India | 5 | 1 | 4 | 14 | 57 | −43 | .200 | 4 | |
| 6 | Pakistan | 5 | 0 | 5 | 7 | 82 | −75 | .000 | 5 | |

Source: Baseball Federation of Asia
(H) Hosts

| Date | Local time | Road team | Score | Home team | Inn. | Venue | Game duration | Attendance | Boxscore |
|---|---|---|---|---|---|---|---|---|---|
| 2 September | 11:00 | Hong Kong | 17–2 | Pakistan | | Sai Tso Wan Recreation Ground | | | |
| 2 September | 15:00 | South Korea | 0–11 | Japan | | Sai Tso Wan Recreation Ground | | | |
| 3 September | 9:00 | Pakistan | 1–23 | South Korea | | Sai Tso Wan Recreation Ground | | | |
| 3 September | 12:00 | Japan | 6–1 | Chinese Taipei | | Sai Tso Wan Recreation Ground | | | |
| 3 September | 15:00 | India | 5–18 | Hong Kong | | Sai Tso Wan Recreation Ground | | | |
| 4 September | 9:00 | Pakistan | 0–17 | Japan | | Sai Tso Wan Recreation Ground | | | |
| 4 September | 12:00 | Hong Kong | 1–16 | Chinese Taipei | | Sai Tso Wan Recreation Ground | | | |
| 4 September | 15:00 | South Korea | 9–0 | India | | Sai Tso Wan Recreation Ground | | | |
| 5 September | 9:00 | India | 9–3 | Pakistan | | Sai Tso Wan Recreation Ground | | | |
| 5 September | 12:00 | Japan | 2–0 | Hong Kong | | Sai Tso Wan Recreation Ground | | | |
| 5 September | 15:00 | Chinese Taipei | 17–0 | South Korea | | Sai Tso Wan Recreation Ground | | | |
| 6 September | 9:00 | Japan | 17–0 | India | | Sai Tso Wan Recreation Ground | | | |
| 6 September | 12:00 | Chinese Taipei | 16–1 | Pakistan | | Sai Tso Wan Recreation Ground | | | |
| 6 September | 15:00 | Hong Kong | 4–9 | South Korea | | Sai Tso Wan Recreation Ground | | | |
| 7 September | 9:00 | Chinese Taipei | 10–0 | India | | Sai Tso Wan Recreation Ground | | | |

== Final standing ==
| Qualification to 2018 Women's Baseball World Cup |

| Rank | Team |
|---|---|
| 1st place, gold medalist(s) | Japan |
| 2nd place, silver medalist(s) | Chinese Taipei |
| 3rd place, bronze medalist(s) | South Korea |
| 4 | Hong Kong |
| 5 | India |
| 6 | Pakistan |
