= 2019 Women's Baseball Asian Cup =

Tournament details
- Country: China
- Dates: 9 – 15 November
- Teams: 8
- Defending champions: Japan

Final positions
- Champions: Japan (2nd title)
- Runners-up: Chinese Taipei
- Third place: Philippines
- Fourth place: China

The 2019 Women's Baseball Asian Cup is the second edition of the Women's Baseball Asian Cup. It was held at the 3,000-capacity Panda Memorial Stadium in Zhongshan, Guangdong, China from 9 to 15 November 2017. This is the first tournament which adopts a super round with the eight participating teams divided into two groups in the opening round. Host China, and the Philippines made their debut in competitive baseball in the tournament.

The tournament serves as the Asian qualifiers for the 2020 Women's Baseball World Cup with all four teams which advanced to the super round qualifying for the international tournament.

== Teams ==
- China (Hosts)
- Chinese Taipei
- Hong Kong
- India
- Japan
- South Korea
- Pakistan
- Philippines

== Opening round ==
=== Group A ===
Pos	Team	Pld	W	L	RF	RA	RD	PCT	GB	Qualification
1	Japan	3	3	0	74	0	+74	1.000	—	Advance to super round
2	China (H)	3	2	1	41	38	+3	.667	1	Advance to super round
3	India	3	1	2	45	41	+4	.333	2	Advance to classification round
4	Pakistan	3	0	3	3	84	−81	.000	3	Advance to classification round

Source: Baseball Federation of Asia
(H) Hosts

Date	Local time	Road team	Score	Home team	Inn.	Venue	Game duration	Attendance	Boxscore
9 November	10:00	Japan	16–0	India		Panda Memorial Stadium			
9 November	19:30	China	17–2	Pakistan		Panda Memorial Stadium			
10 November	13:00	Pakistan	0–38	Japan		Panda Memorial Stadium			
10 November	19:00	India	16–24	China		Panda Memorial Stadium			
11 November	16:00	India	29–1	Pakistan		Panda Memorial Stadium			
11 November	19:00	Japan	20–0	China		Panda Memorial Stadium			

=== Group B ===
Pos	Team	Pld	W	L	RF	RA	RD	PCT	GB	Qualification
1	Chinese Taipei	3	3	0	39	2	+37	1.000	—	Advance to super round
2	Philippines	3	2	1	26	25	+1	.667	1	Advance to super round
3	South Korea	3	1	2	28	44	−16	.333	2	Advance to classification round
4	Hong Kong	3	0	3	21	43	−22	.000	3	Advance to classification round

Source: Baseball Federation of Asia

Date	Local time	Road team	Score	Home team	Inn.	Venue	Game duration	Attendance	Boxscore
9 November	13:00	Hong Kong	3–12	Philippines		Panda Memorial Stadium			
9 November	17:00	Chinese Taipei	12–2	South Korea		Panda Memorial Stadium			
10 November	13:00	South Korea	7–14	Philippines		Panda Memorial Stadium			
10 November	19:00	Chinese Taipei	12–0	Hong Kong		Panda Memorial Stadium			
11 November	16:00	Philippines	0–15	Chinese Taipei		Panda Memorial Stadium			
11 November	19:00	South Korea	19–18	Hong Kong		Panda Memorial Stadium			

== Classification round ==
Pos	Team	Pld	W	L	RF	RA	RD	PCT	GB
1	South Korea	5	3	2	58	45	+13	.600	—
2	Hong Kong	5	2	3	51	45	+6	.400	1
3	India	5	1	4	47	54	−7	.200	2
4	Pakistan	5	0	5	4	131	−127	.000	3

Source: Baseball Federation of Asia

Date	Local time	Road team	Score	Home team	Inn.	Venue	Game duration	Attendance	Boxscore
13 November		India	1–4	South Korea		Panda Memorial Stadium			
14 November		Hong Kong	21–1	Pakistan		Panda Memorial Stadium			
14 November		India	1–9	Hong Kong		Panda Memorial Stadium			
14 November		South Korea	26–0	Pakistan		Panda Memorial Stadium			

== Super round ==
Pos	Team	Pld	W	L	RF	RA	RD	PCT	GB	Qualification
1	Japan	5	5	0	108	3	+105	1.000	—	Advance to final
2	Chinese Taipei	5	4	1	55	18	+37	.800	1	Advance to final
3	Philippines	5	3	2	34	45	−11	.600	2	Advance to third place play-off
4	China (H)	5	2	3	43	59	−16	.400	3	Advance to third place play-off

First match(es) will be played: 30 May 2023. Source: Baseball Federation of Asia
(H) Hosts

Date	Local time	Road team	Score	Home team	Inn.	Venue	Game duration	Attendance	Boxscore
13 November	13:00	China	2–6	Philippines		Panda Memorial Stadium			
13 November	19:00	Japan	16–1	Chinese Taipei		Panda Memorial Stadium			
14 November	13:00	Japan	18–2	Philippines		Panda Memorial Stadium			
14 November	19:00	Chinese Taipei	15–0	China		Panda Memorial Stadium			

== 3rd place game ==
15 November 2019 13:00 Panda Memorial Stadium
Team	1	2	3	4	5	R	H	E
China	0	1	0	0	0	1	4	3
Philippines	3	4	0	2	2	11	9	0
Boxscore

== Final ==
15 November 2019 15:00 Panda Memorial Stadium
Team	1	2	3	4	5	6	7	R	H	E
Chinese Taipei	0	0	0	1	0	0	0	1	3	0
Japan	0	0	2	0	0	0	X	2	7	0
Boxscore

== Final standing ==
Qualification to 2021 Women's Baseball World Cup

Rank	Team
1st place, gold medalist(s)	Japan
2nd place, silver medalist(s)	Chinese Taipei
3rd place, bronze medalist(s)	Philippines
4	China
5	South Korea
6	Hong Kong
7	India
8	Pakistan
