= Women's Baseball Asian Cup =

Main competition for national teams of Asia in women's baseball

- Current season, competition or edition: 2025 Women's Baseball Asian Cup
- Sport: Baseball
- Founded: 2017
- No. of teams: 10 (in 2025)
- Continent: Asia
- Most recent champion: Japan (2025)
- Most titles: Japan (4 titles)

The Women's Baseball Asian Cup is the main competition for national teams of Asia in women's baseball.

== History ==
The World Baseball Softball Confederation announced in May 2017, that the first Women's Baseball Asian Cup will be held in Hong Kong within the same year. The tournament is to be hosted every two years and will serve as the Asian qualifiers for the Women's Baseball World Cup. Japan despite fielding only players under-18 years old, clinched the inaugural title.

== Results ==
#	Year	Final Host	Final			Semifinalists			Teams
#	Year	Final Host	Champions	Score	Runners-Up	3rd Place	Score	4th Place	Teams
1	2017; Details	Hong Kong	Japan	round robin	Chinese Taipei	South Korea	round robin	Hong Kong	6
2	2019; Details	(China); Zhongshan	Japan	2 – 1	Chinese Taipei	Philippines	11 – 1	China	8
3	2023; Details	Hong Kong	Japan	8 – 3	Chinese Taipei	South Korea	14 – 4	Hong Kong	12
4	2025; Details	(China); Hangzhou	Japan	8 – 0	Chinese Taipei	Hong Kong	6 – 5	South Korea	10

== Medal table ==
Rank	Nation	Gold	Silver	Bronze	Total
1	Japan	4	0	0	4
2	Chinese Taipei	0	4	0	4
3	South Korea	0	0	2	2
4	Hong Kong	0	0	1	1
4	Philippines	0	0	1	1
Totals (5 entries)		4	4	4	12

== Participating nations ==
Host country

Nation	2017 (6)	2019 (8)	2023 (12)	2025 (10)	Total
China		4th	6th	5th	3
Chinese Taipei	2nd	2nd	2nd	2nd	4
Hong Kong	4th	6th	4th	3rd	4
India	5th	7th	7th	9th	4
Indonesia			8th	7th	2
Japan	1st	1st	1st	1st	4
Malaysia			11th		1
Pakistan	6th	8th	9th		3
Philippines		3rd	5th	6th	3
South Korea	3rd	5th	3rd	4th	4
Sri Lanka			12th	10th	2
Thailand			10th	8th	2

== See also ==
- Women's Softball Asia Cup
- Men's Baseball Asian Cup
- Men's Softball Asia Cup
- Women's Baseball World Cup
- Women's Softball World Cup
- Baseball at the Asian Games
- Softball at the Asian Games
