= 2014 Women's Baseball World Cup =

Tournament details
- Country: Japan
- Dates: 1–7 September
- Teams: 8
- Defending champions: Japan

Final positions
- Champions: Japan (4th title)
- Runners-up: United States
- Third place: Australia
- Fourth place: Canada

Tournament statistics
- Games played: 16
- Attendance: 41,026 (2,564 per game)

Awards
- MVP: Ayami Sato

The 2014 Women's Baseball World Cup was an international baseball competition being held in Miyazaki, Japan from 1–7 September 2014.

== Teams ==
The following 8 teams appeared at the tournament.

Australia	4th, 2012 World Cup
Canada	2012 World Cup
Chinese Taipei	6th, 2012 World Cup
Hong Kong	Did not participate, 2012 World Cup
Japan	2012 World Cup
Netherlands	7th, 2012 World Cup
United States	2012 World Cup
Venezuela	5th, 2012 World Cup

== Round 1 ==
=== Group A ===
Teams	W	L	Pct.	GB	R	RA
Japan	3	0	1.000	–	47	0
Australia	2	1	.667	1	33	18
Venezuela	1	2	.333	2	8	22
Hong Kong	0	3	.000	3	5	53

1 September 2014	Venezuela	5 – 4	Hong Kong	Sun Marine Stadium; Attendance: 500
1 September 2014		Boxscore		Sun Marine Stadium; Attendance: 500

1 September 2014	Japan	14 – 0 F/5	Australia	Sun Marine Stadium; Attendance: 8500
1 September 2014		Boxscore		Sun Marine Stadium; Attendance: 8500

2 September 2014	Australia	4 – 3	Venezuela	Ivy Stadium; Attendance: 400
2 September 2014		Boxscore		Ivy Stadium; Attendance: 400

2 September 2014	Hong Kong	0 – 19 F/5	Japan	Sun Marine Stadium; Attendance: 7000
2 September 2014		Boxscore		Sun Marine Stadium; Attendance: 7000

3 September 2014	Japan	14 – 0 F/5	Venezuela	Sun Marine Stadium; Attendance: 2000
3 September 2014		Boxscore		Sun Marine Stadium; Attendance: 2000

4 September 2014	Australia	29 – 1 F/5	Hong Kong	Sun Marine Stadium; Attendance: 300
4 September 2014		Boxscore		Sun Marine Stadium; Attendance: 300

=== Group B ===
Teams	W	L	Pct.	GB	R	RA
United States	3	0	1.000	–	34	7
Canada	2	1	.667	1	27	16
Chinese Taipei	1	2	.333	2	12	20
Netherlands	0	3	.000	3	2	32

1 September 2014	Canada	11 – 0 F/5	Netherlands	Ivy Stadium; Attendance: 100
1 September 2014		Boxscore		Ivy Stadium; Attendance: 100

1 September 2014	United States	9 – 0	Chinese Taipei	Ivy Stadium; Attendance: 250
1 September 2014		Boxscore		Ivy Stadium; Attendance: 250

2 September 2014	Canada	9 – 8 F/8	Chinese Taipei	Ivy Stadium; Attendance: 225
2 September 2014		Boxscore		Ivy Stadium; Attendance: 225

2 September 2014	Netherlands	0 – 17 F/5	United States	Sun Marine Stadium; Attendance: 900
2 September 2014		Boxscore		Sun Marine Stadium; Attendance: 900

3 September 2014	Chinese Taipei	4 – 2	Netherlands	Ivy Stadium; Attendance: 600
3 September 2014		Boxscore		Ivy Stadium; Attendance: 600

3 September 2014	United States	8 – 7	Canada	Sun Marine Stadium; Attendance: 1053
3 September 2014		Boxscore		Sun Marine Stadium; Attendance: 1053

== Round 2 ==
Results from Round 1 between teams from the same pool carry over

=== Group C ===
Teams	W	L	Pct.	GB	R	RA
Japan	3	0	1.000	–	27	2
United States	2	1	.667	1	11	9
Australia	1	2	.333	2	7	22
Canada	0	3	.000	3	14	26

5 September 2014	United States	3 – 1	Australia	Sun Marine Stadium; Attendance: 1100
5 September 2014		Boxscore		Sun Marine Stadium; Attendance: 1100

5 September 2014	Japan	12 – 2 F/5	Canada	Sun Marine Stadium; Attendance: 2500
5 September 2014		Boxscore		Sun Marine Stadium; Attendance: 2500

6 September 2014	Canada	5 – 6 F/9	Australia	Sun Marine Stadium; Attendance: 543
6 September 2014		Boxscore		Sun Marine Stadium; Attendance: 543

6 September 2014	Japan	1 – 0	United States	Sun Marine Stadium; Attendance: 14,000
6 September 2014		Boxscore		Sun Marine Stadium; Attendance: 14,000

=== Group D ===
Teams	W	L	Pct.	GB	R	RA
Chinese Taipei	3	0	1.000	–	34	7
Venezuela	2	1	.667	1	12	17
Hong Kong	1	2	.333	2	27	35
Netherlands	0	3	.000	3	14	29

5 September 2014	Venezuela	6 – 1	Netherlands	Ivy Stadium; Attendance: 500
5 September 2014		Boxscore		Ivy Stadium; Attendance: 500

5 September 2014	Chinese Taipei	19 – 4 F/5	Hong Kong	Ivy Stadium; Attendance: 50
5 September 2014		Boxscore		Ivy Stadium; Attendance: 50

6 September 2014	Hong Kong	19 – 11	Netherlands	Ivy Stadium; Attendance: 320
6 September 2014		Boxscore		Ivy Stadium; Attendance: 320

6 September 2014	Chinese Taipei	11 – 1 F/6	Venezuela	Ivy Stadium; Attendance: 185
6 September 2014		Boxscore		Ivy Stadium; Attendance: 185

== Round 3 ==
=== 7th-8th Place ===
7 September 2014	Hong Kong	4 – 0	Netherlands	Ivy Stadium

=== 5th-6th Place ===
7 September 2014	Chinese Taipei	4 – 0	Venezuela	Ivy Stadium

=== Bronze Medal ===
7 September 2014	Australia	3 – 2	Canada	Sun Marine Stadium

=== Gold Medal ===
7 September 2014	Japan	3 – 0	United States	Sun Marine Stadium

2014 Women's Baseball World Cup champions

Japan
fourth title

== Awards and leaders ==
=== Individual awards ===
- Most valuable player: (Japan) Ayami Sato
- Outstanding defensive player: (United States) Jade Gortarez

=== All star team ===
Position	Name	Team
Starting pitcher	Nana Sasanuma	Japan
Relief pitcher	Sarah Hudek	United States
Catcher	Stéphanie Savoie	Canada
First base	Malaika Underwood	United States
Second base	Shae Lillywhite	Australia
Third base	Ya-Ting Wen	Chinese Taipei
Shortstop	Miki Atsugase	Japan
Outfielders	Hsiao-Mei Chen	Chinese Taipei
Outfielders	Akiko Shimura	Japan
Outfielders	Iori Miura	Japan
Designated hitter	Nidia Pineda	Chinese Taipei

=== Statistical leaders ===
- Best batting average: (Japan) Miki Atsugase, .583 in 12 at bats
- Most runs batted in: (Chinese Taipei) Hsiao-Mei Chen, 13
- Most stolen bases: (Hong Kong) Tsz Yan, 7
- Most runs scored: (Chinese Taipei) Chu-Yu Pan, 11
- Lowest earned run average: (Japan) Ayami Sato, 0.00 in 12 innings pitched
- Best win–loss record: (Japan) Sato, 2–0
