= 2016 Women's Baseball World Cup =

Basketball world cup

Tournament details
- Country: South Korea
- City: Gijang
- Venue(s): Dream Main Park, Dream Park 2, Dream Park 3
- Dates: 3 September - 11 September
- Teams: 12
- Defending champions: Japan

Final positions
- Champions: Japan (5th title)
- Runners-up: Canada
- Third place: Venezuela
- Fourth place: Chinese Taipei

Tournament statistics
- Games played: 44
- Attendance: 18,767 (427 per game)

Awards
- MVP: Ayami Sato

The 2016 Women's Baseball World Cup was the 7th edition of the WBSC Women's Baseball World Cup, the biennial international women's baseball world championship tournament. The competition was held in Gijang, South Korea from September 3 to September 11, 2016.

== Teams ==
For 2016, the number of qualifying teams grew from eight for its 6th edition in 2014 to twelve teams.

The following 12 teams qualified for the tournament.

Team	Finals appearance	Last appearance	Previous performance	Previous best performance
Australia	7th	2014	3rd Place	Runners Up (2010)
Netherlands	4th	2014	8th place	7th place (2012)
Canada	7th	2014	4th place	Runners Up (2008)
Cuba	4th	2012	8th place	6th place (2006,2010)
United States	7th	2014	2nd Place	Winners (2004,2006)
Venezuela	4th	2014	6th place	4th place (2010)
Chinese Taipei	7th	2014	5th place	5th place (2004,2006,2008,2014)
Hong Kong	4th	2014	7th place	7th place (2006,2014)
India	2nd	2008	7th place	7th place (2008)
Pakistan	1st			1st Appearance
Japan	7th	2014	1st Place	1st Place (2008,2010,2012,2014)
South Korea	3rd	2010	6thPlace	6th place (2008)

== Round 1 ==
The matches were played from September 3 to 5. The top two teams from each group advanced to the next round.

=== Group A ===
Teams	W	L	Pct.	GB	R	RA
Venezuela	3	0	1.000	–	42	2
South Korea(H)	2	1	.666	1	15	15
Cuba	1	2	.333	2	18	16
Pakistan	0	3	.000	3	1	43

3 September 2016	South Korea	10–0 F/6	Pakistan	Dream Main Park; Attendance: 800
3 September 2016		Boxscore		Dream Main Park; Attendance: 800

3 September 2016	Cuba	0–12 F/5	Venezuela	Dream Park 2 Attendance: 100
3 September 2016		Boxscore		Dream Park 2 Attendance: 100

4 September 2016	Pakistan	1 – 18 F/5	Venezuela	Dream Park 2 Attendance: 65
4 September 2016		Boxscore		Dream Park 2 Attendance: 65

4 September 2016	Cuba	3 – 4	South Korea	Dream Main Park; Attendance: 850
4 September 2016		Boxscore		Dream Main Park; Attendance: 850

5 September 2016	Pakistan	0 – 15 F/5	Cuba	Dream Park 2 Attendance: 200
5 September 2016		Boxscore		Dream Park 2 Attendance: 200

5 September 2016	Venezuela	12 – 1 F/5	South Korea	Dream Main Park; Attendance: 1,000
5 September 2016		Boxscore		Dream Main Park; Attendance: 1,000

=== Group B ===
Teams	W	L	Pct.	GB	R	RA
Japan	3	0	1.000	–	38	2
Canada	2	1	.666	1	27	13
Netherlands	1	2	.333	2	10	21
India	0	3	.000	3	6	45

3 September 2016	India	2 – 9	Netherlands	Dream Park 2 Attendance: 150
3 September 2016		Boxscore		Dream Park 2 Attendance: 150

3 September 2016	Japan	8 – 2	Canada	Dream Main Park; Attendance: 800
3 September 2016		Boxscore		Dream Main Park; Attendance: 800

4 September 2016	Netherlands	0 – 12 F/5	Japan	Dream Main Park; Attendance: 700
4 September 2016		Boxscore		Dream Main Park; Attendance: 700

4 September 2016	Canada	18 – 4 F/5	India	Dream Park 2 Attendance: 50
4 September 2016		Boxscore		Dream Park 2 Attendance: 50

5 September 2016	India	0 – 18 F/5	Japan	Dream Main Park; Attendance: 550
5 September 2016		Boxscore		Dream Main Park; Attendance: 550

5 September 2016	Netherlands	1 – 7	Canada	Dream Park 2 Attendance: 250
5 September 2016		Boxscore		Dream Park 2 Attendance: 250

=== Group C ===
Teams	W	L	Pct.	GB	R	RA
Chinese Taipei	2	1	.666	–	26	9
Australia	2	1	.666	–	27	14
United States	2	1	.666	–	13	12
Hong Kong	0	3	.000	2	4	35

3 September 2016	Hong Kong	1 – 9	United States	Dream Park 3 Attendance: 50
3 September 2016		Boxscore		Dream Park 3 Attendance: 50

3 September 2016	Chinese Taipei	12 – 4	Australia	Dream Park 3 Attendance: 250
3 September 2016		Boxscore		Dream Park 3 Attendance: 250

4 September 2016	Chinese Taipei	1 – 2	United States	Dream Park 3 Attendance: 700
4 September 2016		Boxscore		Dream Park 3 Attendance: 700

4 September 2016	Australia	13 – 0 F/5	Hong Kong	Dream Park 3 Attendance: 150
4 September 2016		Boxscore		Dream Park 3 Attendance: 150

5 September 2016	United States	2 – 10	Australia	Dream Park 3 Attendance: 800
5 September 2016		Boxscore		Dream Park 3 Attendance: 800

5 September 2016	Hong Kong	3 – 13 F/6	Chinese Taipei	Dream Park 3 Attendance: 200
5 September 2016		Boxscore		Dream Park 3 Attendance: 200

== Round 2 ==
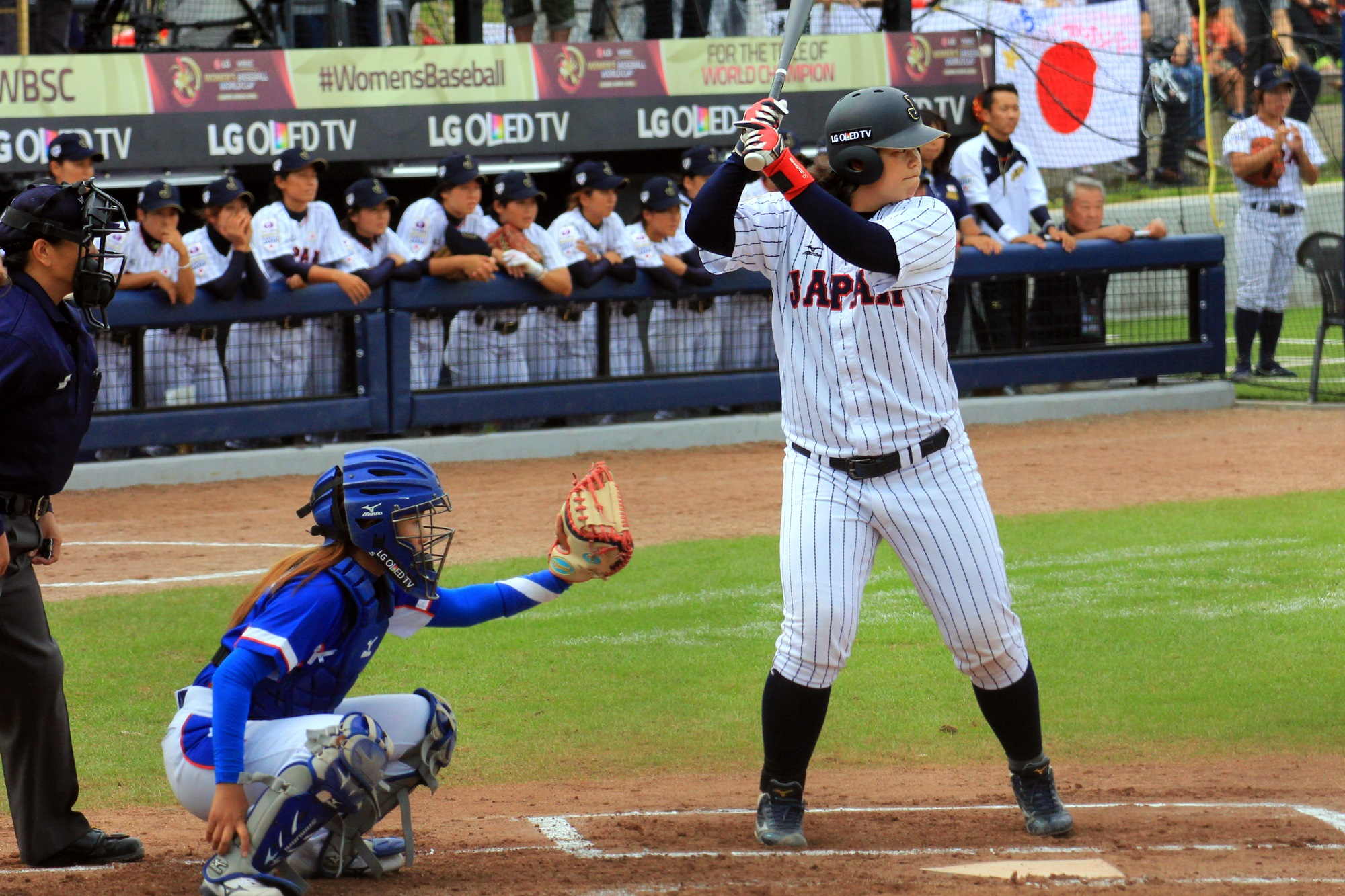
Japan and South Korea square off in the Super Round

The matches were played from September 7 to 10. The head to head results of Opening Round games between two nations that advanced to the Super Round carried over and counted to establish four qualified nations for the Final Round as well as overall competition standings. The same methodology applied to the consolation round. The top two teams from the Super Round will qualify for the World Championship Final and the 3rd and 4th placed teams in the Super Round will play for the Bronze Medal Game.

=== Super Round ===
Teams	W	L	Pct.	GB	R	RA
Japan	5	0	1.000	–	41	4
Canada	4	1	.800	1.0	26	13
Venezuela	3	2	.600	2.0	24	20
Chinese Taipei	2	3	.400	3.0	24	19
Australia	1	4	.200	4.0	24	34
South Korea(H)	0	5	.000	5.0	2	51

7 September 2016	South Korea	1 – 11 F/5	Chinese Taipei	Dream Main Park; Attendance: 950
7 September 2016		Boxscore		Dream Main Park; Attendance: 950

7 September 2016	Venezuela	2 – 7	Japan	Dream Main Park; Attendance: 550
7 September 2016		Boxscore		Dream Main Park; Attendance: 550

7 September 2016	Australia	3 – 5	Canada	Dream Main Park; Attendance: 251
7 September 2016		Boxscore		Dream Main Park; Attendance: 251

8 September 2016	Australia	13 – 0 F/5	South Korea	Dream Main Park; Attendance: 50
8 September 2016		Boxscore		Dream Main Park; Attendance: 50

8 September 2016	Canada	8 – 1	Venezuela	Dream Main Park; Attendance: 500
8 September 2016		Boxscore		Dream Main Park; Attendance: 500

8 September 2016	Chinese Taipei	0 – 10 F/5	Japan	Dream Main Park; Attendance: 150
8 September 2016		Boxscore		Dream Main Park; Attendance: 150

9 September 2016	South Korea	0 – 9	Canada	Dream Main Park; Attendance: 760
9 September 2016		Boxscore		Dream Main Park; Attendance: 760

9 September 2016	Venezuela	2 – 0	Chinese Taipei	Dream Main Park; Attendance: 720
9 September 2016		Boxscore		Dream Main Park; Attendance: 720

9 September 2016	Australia	0 – 10 F/5	Japan	Dream Main Park; Attendance: 350
9 September 2016		Boxscore		Dream Main Park; Attendance: 350

10 September 2016	Canada	2 – 1	Chinese Taipei	Dream Main Park; Attendance: 100
10 September 2016		Boxscore		Dream Main Park; Attendance: 100

10 September 2016	South Korea	0–6	Japan	Dream Main Park; Attendance: 340
10 September 2016		Boxscore		Dream Main Park; Attendance: 340

10 September 2016	Australia	4–7	Venezuela	Dream Main Park; Attendance: 255
10 September 2016		Boxscore		Dream Main Park; Attendance: 255

=== Consolation round ===
Teams	W	L	Pct.	GB	R	RA
United States	5	0	1.000	–	73	2
Cuba	4	1	.800	1.0	39	20
Netherlands	3	2	.600	2.0	40	29
Hong Kong	2	3	.400	3.0	28	21
India	1	4	.200	4.0	22	43
Pakistan	0	5	.000	5.0	7	94

7 September 2016	Cuba	9 – 8 F/8	Netherlands	Dream Park 2 Attendance: 210
7 September 2016		Boxscore		Dream Park 2 Attendance: 210

7 September 2016	Hong Kong	10 – 0 F/6	India	Dream Park 3 Attendance: 100
7 September 2016		Boxscore		Dream Park 3 Attendance: 100

7 September 2016	United States	34 – 0 F/5	Pakistan	Dream Park 2 Attendance: 75
7 September 2016		Boxscore		Dream Park 2 Attendance: 75

8 September 2016	India	1 – 12 F/5	Cuba	Dream Park 2 Attendance: 150
8 September 2016		Boxscore		Dream Park 2 Attendance: 150

8 September 2016	Hong Kong	12 – 1 F/6	Pakistan	Dream Park 3 Attendance: 261
8 September 2016		Boxscore		Dream Park 3 Attendance: 261

8 September 2016	United States	10 – 0 F/5	Netherlands	Dream Park 2 Attendance: 275
8 September 2016		Boxscore		Dream Park 2 Attendance: 275

9 September 2016	Pakistan	2 – 19 F/5	India	Dream Park 2 Attendance: 75
9 September 2016		Boxscore		Dream Park 2 Attendance: 75

9 September 2016	Cuba	1 – 10 F/5	United States	Dream Park 3 Attendance: 150
9 September 2016		Boxscore		Dream Park 3 Attendance: 150

9 September 2016	Hong Kong	4 – 9	Netherlands	Dream Park 2 Attendance: 55
9 September 2016		Boxscore		Dream Park 2 Attendance: 55

10 September 2016	India	0 – 10 F/5	United States	Dream Park 2 Attendance: 100
10 September 2016		Boxscore		Dream Park 2 Attendance: 100

10 September 2016	Hong Kong	1–2	Cuba	Dream Park 3 Attendance: 100
10 September 2016		Boxscore		Dream Park 3 Attendance: 100

10 September 2016	Pakistan	4–14	Netherlands	Dream Park 2 Attendance: 75
10 September 2016		Boxscore		Dream Park 2 Attendance: 75

== Round 3 ==
=== Bronze Medal ===
11 September 2016	Chinese Taipei	3 – 4	Venezuela	Dream Main Park; Attendance: 2,200
11 September 2016		Boxscore		Dream Main Park; Attendance: 2,200

=== Gold Medal ===
11 September 2016	Canada	0–10	Japan	Dream Main Park; Attendance: 2,300
11 September 2016		Boxscore		Dream Main Park; Attendance: 2,300

== Final standings ==
Rk	Team	W	L
1	Japan	8	0
Lost in the final
2	Canada	6	2
Failed to qualify for final
3	Venezuela	6	2
4	Chinese Taipei	3	5
Failed to qualify for medal games
5	Australia	3	4
6	South Korea	2	5
7	United States	6	1
8	Cuba	4	3
9	Netherlands	3	4
10	Hong Kong	2	5
11	India	1	6
12	Pakistan	0	7

2016 Women's Baseball World champions

Japan
5th title

== Awards and leaders ==
=== Individual awards ===
- Most valuable player: (Japan) Ayami Sato
- Outstanding defensive player: (Netherlands) Famke Gildemacher

=== All-World team ===
Position	Name	Team
Starting pitcher	Ayami Sato	Japan
Relief pitcher	Chiao Yun Huang	Chinese Taipei
Catcher	Tahnee Lovering	Australia
First base	Kate Psota	Canada
Second base	Yuki Kawabata	Japan
Third base	Geeta Bhuyan	India
Shortstop	Niki Boyd	Canada
Outfielders	Brittany Gomez	United States
Outfielders	Chia Wen Shen	Chinese Taipei
Outfielders	Tammy McMillan	Australia
Designated hitter	Tamara Holmes	United States

=== Statistical leaders ===
- Best batting average: (United States) Tamara Holmes, .722
- Most home runs: (Japan) Yurika Arisaka, (United States) Holmes, and (United States) Megan Baltzell, 1
- Most runs batted in: (United States) Holmes and (Netherlands) Sascha Egas, 13
- Most stolen bases: (Japan) Iori Miura, 10
- Most runs scored: (United States) Brittany Gomez, 14
- Best earned run average: (Venezuela) Giddelys Cumana, 0.00 in 12 innings pitched
- Best win–loss record: (Japan) Ayami Sato, 3–0
- Most strikeouts: (Japan) Sato, 21

== Rosters ==
Canada

- Melissa Armstrong (P)
- Amanda Asay (P)
- Veronika Boyd (OF)
- Claire Eccles (P)
- Jenna Flannigan (OF)
- Daphnée Gélinas (IF)
- Jennifer Gilroy (C)
- Katie Hagen (P)
- Rebecca Hartley (OF)
- Heather Healey (P)
- Pascale Jalbert (IF)
- Kelsey Lalor (OF)
- Anne-Sophie Lavallée (P)
- Nicole Luchanski (IF)
- Daniella Matteucci (P)
- Autumn Mills (P)
- Heidi Northcott (P)
- Kate Psota (IF)
- Ashley Stephenson (IF)
- Mia Valcke (OF)

Manager: Andre Lachance

Japan

- Mirai Araki (P)
- Yurika Arisaka (C)
- Miki Atsugase (IF)
- Chihiro Funakoshi (C)
- Airi Hiraga (IF)
- Yukiko Ishida (IF)
- Yuki Kawabata (IF)
- Yaya Kojima (IF)
- Yukiko Kon (IF)
- Iori Miura (OF)
- Remina Nagaike (OF)
- Ayako Rokkaku (IF)
- Nana Sasanuma (P)
- Ayami Sato (P)
- Miyu Shimizu (P)
- Akiko Shimura (OF)
- Mana Taguchi (IF)
- Akino Tanaka (P)
- Ayumi Terabe (C)
- Moemi Yoshii (P)

Manager: Koichi Okura
