= Pakistan women's national baseball team =

Information
- Country: Pakistan
- Federation: Pakistan Federation Baseball
- Confederation: WBSC Asia
- Manager: Tariq Nadeem
- Captain: Zainab Riaz

WBSC ranking
- Current: 17 (April 2025)
- Highest: 12 (December 2014)
- Lowest: 19 (June 2021)

Women's World Cup
- Appearances: 1 (first in 2016)
- Best result: 12

Women's Asian Cup
- Appearances: 2 (first in 2017)
- Best result: 6th

The Pakistan women's national baseball team (Urdu: پاکستان خواتین بیس بال ٹیم) is the national team representing Pakistan in international women's baseball tournaments and competitions.

The team made its Women's Baseball World Cup debut at the 2016 edition in South Korea, and finished 12th overall. The team has competed at all editions of the Women's Baseball Asian Cup, finishing 6th in 2017 and 8th in 2019.

As of April 2025, it is ranked 17th in the world.

== Results and fixtures ==
The following is a list of professional baseball match results currently active in the latest version of the WBSC World Rankings, as well as any future matches that have been scheduled.

Legend

Win Lose Void or postponed Fixture

=== 2022 ===
Women's Baseball Series	27 March	Pakistan	12–0	Malaysia	Bahria Town Cricket Stadium, Lahore, Pakistan
Women's Baseball Series	{{{time}}}		Boxscore

Women's Baseball Series	28 March	Pakistan	18–7	Malaysia	Bahria Town Cricket Stadium, Lahore, Pakistan
Women's Baseball Series	{{{time}}}		Boxscore

Women's Baseball Series	29 March	Pakistan	16–5	Malaysia	Bahria Town Cricket Stadium, Lahore, Pakistan
Women's Baseball Series	{{{time}}}		Boxscore

=== 2023 ===
2023 Women's Baseball Asian Cup Qualifier Round	21 May	Pakistan	16–1	Hong Kong	Sai Tso Wan Recreation Ground, Sai Tso Wan, Kowloon, Hong Kong
2023 Women's Baseball Asian Cup Qualifier Round	17:00		Boxscore

2023 Women's Baseball Asian Cup Qualifier Round	22 May	Pakistan	22–3	Sri Lanka	Sai Tso Wan Recreation Ground, Sai Tso Wan, Kowloon, Hong Kong
2023 Women's Baseball Asian Cup Qualifier Round	10:00		Boxscore

2023 Women's Baseball Asian Cup Qualifier Round	23 May	Indonesia	8–2	Pakistan	Sai Tso Wan Recreation Ground, Sai Tso Wan, Kowloon, Hong Kong
2023 Women's Baseball Asian Cup Qualifier Round	10:00		Boxscore

== See also ==
- Pakistan national baseball team
- Pakistan Federation Baseball
