= Sun Marine Stadium =

Sports venue in Miyazaki, Japan

Coordinates: 31°49′51″N 131°26′45″E

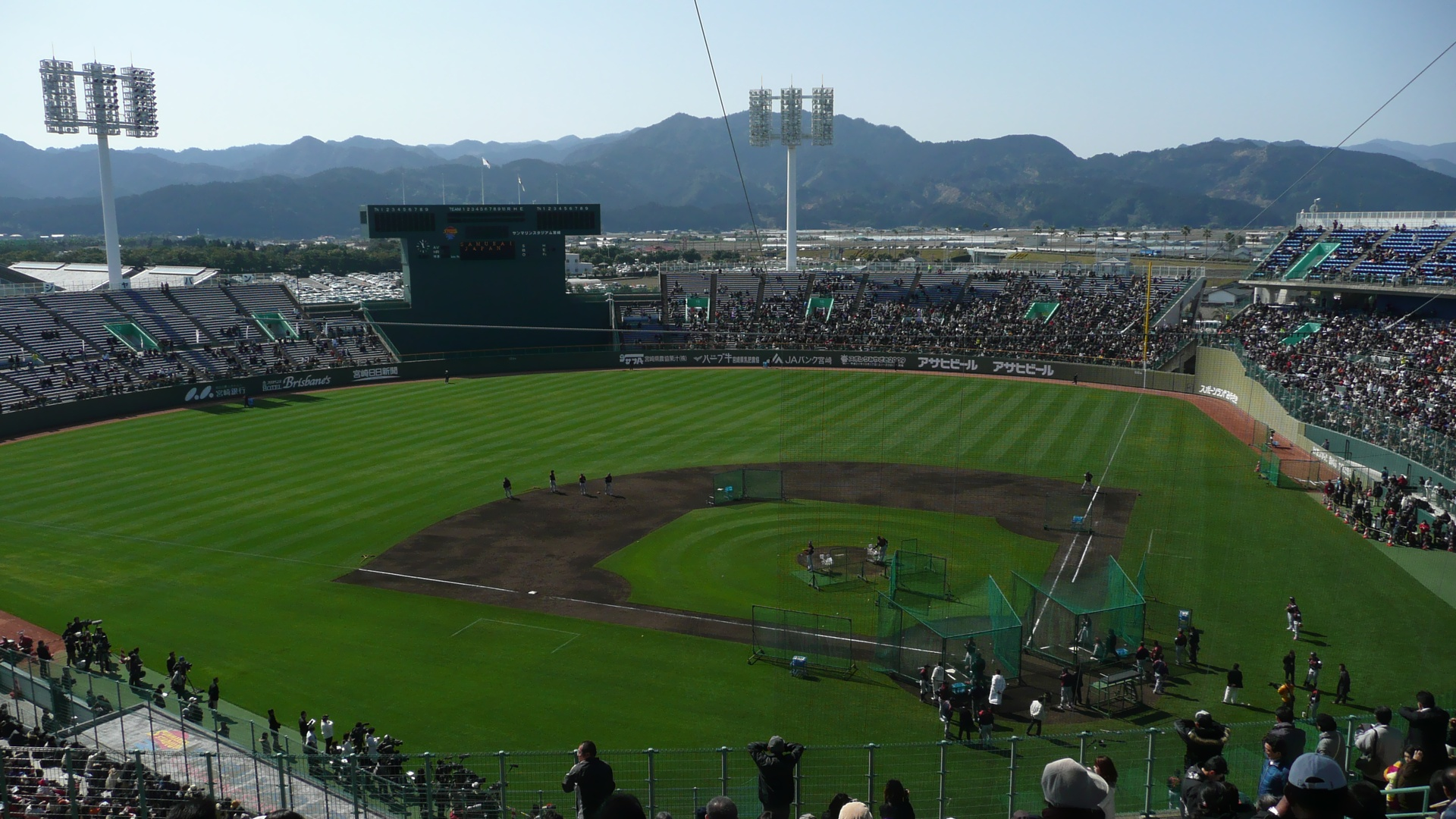

The Sun Marine Stadium Miyazaki (サンマリンスタジアム) is a multi-purpose stadium in Miyazaki, Japan. It is used mostly for baseball games. The stadium was built in 2001 (25 years ago) and holds 30,000 people. It hosted one NPB All-Star Game in 2006.

The stadium hosted a concert for the first time in 2024 for the Hinata Fes music festival, headlined by Hinatazaka46.
