= South Korea women's national baseball team =

Information
- Country: South Korea
- Federation: Korea Baseball Softball Association
- Confederation: WBSC Asia

WBSC ranking
- Current: 8 ▲4 (9 September 2026)

Women's World Cup
- Appearances: 5 (first in 2008)
- Best result: 6th (two times)

Women's Asian Cup
- Appearances: 4 (first in 2017)
- Best result: (bronze) 3rd (2 times, most recent in 2023)

The South Korea women's national baseball team is a national team of South Korea and is controlled by the Korea Baseball Association. It represents the nation in international competition. The team is a member of the WBSC Asia. The team has twice finished sixth at the Women's Baseball World Cup and won the bronze medal twice at the Women's Baseball Asian Cup.

== Tournament record ==
=== Women's World Cup ===
- 2008 : Sixth
- 2010 : Ninth
- 2016 (host): Sixth
- 2018 : 10th
- 2024 : 11th (sixth in Group A)

=== Women's Asian Cup ===
- 2017 : Third
- 2019 : Fifth
- 2023 : Third
- 2025 : Fourth
