= Dominican Republic women's national baseball team =

National team

Information
- Country: Dominican Republic
- Federation: Federación Dominicana de Béisbol
- Confederation: COPABE

WBSC ranking
- Current: 29 ▼8 (31 December 2025)

Women's World Cup
- Appearances: 1 (first in 2018)
- Best result: 6th

The Dominican Republic women's national baseball team is a national team of Dominican Republic and is controlled by the Federación Dominicana de Béisbol. It represents the nation in women's international competition. The team is a member of the COPABE. They made their WBSC Women's Baseball World Cup debut in 2018, and finished in 6th out of twelve teams.
