= Japan women's national baseball team =

Information
- Country: Japan
- Federation: Baseball Federation of Japan
- Confederation: Baseball Federation of Asia
- Manager: Risa Nakajima

WBSC ranking
- Current: 1 (31 December 2025)
- Lowest: 1

Women's World Cup
- Appearances: 9 (first in 2004)
- Best result: 2024
- Best result: (gold) 1st (7 times, most recent in 2024)

Women's Asian Cup
- Appearances: 4 (first in 2017)
- Best result: (gold) 1st (4 times, most recent in 2025)

The Japan women's national baseball team, also known as Madonna Japan (マドンナジャパン) or Samurai Japan (侍ジャパン) represents Japan in international women's baseball competitions. They are currently ranked first in the world by the World Baseball Softball Confederation.

The team won the 2024 Women's Baseball World Cup, their seventh consecutive title. The team won 39 consecutive games in the top international tournament from 2012 to 2024. Japan has also won all four continental Women's Asian Cups, held from 2017 to 2025.

Since 2008, the Japanese woman team's nickname is Madonna Japan. The team also shares the Samurai Japan nickname with the men's national team.

== Current roster ==
Roster selected for the 2024 Women's Baseball World Cup Finals

Japan roster – 2024 Women's Baseball World Cup Finals
Official roster		Coaching staff
Pitchers: 54 Natsuki Kubo; 77 Wakana Mori; 18 Ayami Sato; 17 Miyu Shimizu; 59 Mika Tai; 7 Akino Tanaka; 72 Yuna Tsuchiya	Catchers: 21 Nanako Hanabusa; 5 Misaki Namai; 31 Ayaka Osada; Infielders: 6 Ayaka Deguchi; 15 Akari Hoshikawa; 4 Kae Iwami; 23 Yuki Kawabata; 45 Yuzuha Nakamura; 27 Haruna Tadano; Outfielders: 3 Iori Miura; 10 Miwa Naraoka; 20 Miu Shiraishi; 38 Miwa Tanaka	Manager: 50 Risa Nakashima; Coaches: 70 Katsuhiko Kido; 53 Hiroki Fukutome; 80 Mitsuharu Yokoi

== Tournament record ==
=== Women's Baseball World Cup ===
Women's Baseball World Cup record
Year	Round	Position	Pld	W	L	RS	RA
(Canada) 2004	Finals	(silver) 2nd	6	3	3	23	27
(Taiwan) 2006	Round-robin	(silver) 2nd	6	4	2	92	25
(Japan) 2008	Finals	(gold) 1st	6	6	0	77	12
(Venezuela) 2010	Finals	(gold) 1st	9	8	1	76	18
(Canada) 2012	Finals	(gold) 1st	9	8	1	74	14
(Japan) 2014	Finals	(gold) 1st	6	6	0	63	2
(South Korea) 2016	Finals	(gold) 1st	8	8	0	81	4
(United States) 2018	Finals	(gold) 1st	9	9	0	67	5
(Mexico) 2021	Cancelled due to the COVID-19 pandemic						
(Canada) (Japan) 2024	Finals	(gold) 1st	10	9	1	93	27
Total	7 Titles	9/10	69	61	8	646	134

=== Women's Baseball Asian Cup ===
Women's Baseball Asian Cup record
Year	Round	Position	Pld	W	L
(Hong Kong) 2017	Finals	1st	9	9	0
(South Korea) 2019	Finals	1st	5	5	0
(Hong Kong) 2023	Finals	1st	6	6	0
(China) 2025	Finals	1st	6	6	0
Total	4 Titles	4/4	17	17	0

== See also ==
Japan Women's Baseball League
