= USSSA Space Coast Complex =

Baseball stadium in Viera, Florida

USSSA Space Coast Stadium and Complex

- USSSA Space Coast Stadium′s location in Florida
- Location: 5800 Stadium Parkway; Viera, FL 32940
- Coordinates: 28°15′25″N 80°44′22″W
- Owner: Brevard County, Florida
- Operator: United States Specialty Sports Association
- Capacity: 8,100
- Surface: Multi-purpose field turf
- Field size: Left Field: 340 ft (104 m); Center Field: 404 ft (123 m); Right Field: 340 ft (104 m)

Construction
- Groundbreaking: April 29, 1993
- Opened: March 2, 1994
- Cost: US$6.2 million ($13.5 million in 2025 dollars)
- Architect: DLR Group
- General contractors: Miorelli Construction, Inc.

Tenants
- Brevard County Manatees (FSL) (1994–2016); Florida Marlins (MLB) (spring training) (1994–2002); Montreal Expos (MLB) (spring training) (2003–2004); Washington Nationals (MLB) (spring training) (2005–2016); GCL Nationals (GCL) (2005–2016); United States Specialty Sports Association (USSSA) (fall 2017–present); USSSA Pride (WPF) (2017–present); Viera High School Hawks (2018-present)

Website
- USSSA Space Coast Complex

USSSA Space Coast Complex is a baseball stadium and 13 diamond multi-sports facility in Viera, Florida, owned by Brevard County, Florida. Under its original name, Space Coast Stadium, it served as the spring training facility for the Florida Marlins (1994–2002), Montreal Expos (2003–2004), and Washington Nationals (2005–2016) and as the home field of the Brevard County Manatees (1994–2016). After a full year of renovations, it officially reopened in 2017 with its new name as a baseball/softball venue – part of a new multi-sport complex operated by the United States Specialty Sports Association (USSSA). Since 2017, it has been the home field of the USSSA Pride women's professional fast-pitch softball team. Since 2018, Viera High School has used the stadium for varsity baseball games and its annual graduation ceremonies.

== History ==
=== Construction and opening ===
Space Coast Stadium was completed before the 1994 Major League Baseball season as part of a plan to bring the Florida Marlins to Viera for spring training. Ground was broken for the new stadium in what had been a pasture on April 29, 1993, and construction cost US$6.2 million.

Opening ceremonies took place on March 2, 1994 – the same day as a launch of the Space Shuttle Columbia at the nearby Kennedy Space Center at Cape Canaveral – followed immediately by the Marlins′ first spring training game at the ballpark, in which they defeated the Kansas City Royals 9-6 before a crowd of 7,494.

=== 1994–2016 ===
The Florida Marlins held spring training at Space Coast Stadium through the 2002 season. In 2002, as part of an agreement in which Jeffrey Loria sold the Montreal Expos to Major League Baseball and purchased the Marlins, the Marlins swapped training sites with the Expos, who had been training in Jupiter. The Expos held two seasons of training at Space Coast Stadium in 2003 and 2004. The Expos franchise then moved from Montreal to Washington, D.C., to become the Washington Nationals. The Nationals conducted spring training at Space Coast Stadium from their inaugural season in 2005 through 2016. They played from seven to fifteen games per season in the stadium. Game attendance averaged from 4,690 in 2010 to 3,433 in 2011. The Nationals contracted to make annual $765,000 stadium-construction bond payments through March 2013.

Space Coast Stadium was the home of the Brevard County Manatees, a minor league baseball franchise that played in the Class A-Advanced Florida State League, from 1994 to 2016. The Gulf Coast League Nationals of the Gulf Coast League, the Washington Nationals′ rookie league affiliate, also played occasional home games at Space Coast Stadium during the Washington Nationals′ tenure there.

The Florida State League All-Star Game was played at Space Coast Stadium three times. In the first game, on June 22, 1996, the 6,904 people who saw the game set a record for attendance at the annual league all-star game that stood through at least 2015. In the second game, held on June 14, 2008, the West Division prevailed over the East Division by a score of 9–3 with 3,402 fans looking on. The game was played the third and final time at Space Coast Stadium on June 12, 2010, with the South Division defeating the North Division 5–4 in 10 innings before a crowd of 4,133.

With a crowd of nearly 18,000 people in attendance, U.S. President George W. Bush held one of his final campaign rallies for the 2004 U.S. presidential election at Space Coast Stadium on October 23, 2004, arriving and departing in his Marine One helicopter. It was one of four campaign stops he made in Florida that day. While he spoke at the stadium, he was momentarily drowned out by the roar of a United States Air Force F-16 Fighting Falcon fighter as it intercepted a stray airplane that entered airspace near the stadium that was restricted during Bush's visit.

Between 1997 and March 2011, Brevard County spent US$7.8 million on capital improvements to Space Coast Stadium, $2.8 million of it in 2006 and 2007 in an effort to keep the Nationals from relocating elsewhere. About $5 million worth of improvements funded by Brevard County's tourist tax were made to the stadium between 2005 and 2010. In 2011, the county assessed the 33.4 acres (13.5 ha) stadium site as having a value of US$26.5 million.

=== Departure of the Nationals and Manatees ===
The Washington Nationals held spring training at Space Coast Stadium for the last time in 2016. The team's last game at the stadium was a 7–2 victory over the Atlanta Braves on March 27, 2016. The Nationals′ last scheduled game at the stadium on March 28, 2016, was rained out, resulting in the cancellation of activities planned to commemorate the franchise's history there. In 2017, the Nationals moved their spring training operations to West Palm Beach, where they share facilities with the Houston Astros at FITTEAM Ballpark of the Palm Beaches, a facility which opened in February 2017.

The Brevard County Manatees also departed after the 2016 season, playing their last game at Space Coast Stadium on September 4, 2016, losing to the Daytona Tortugas 6–4 before a crowd of 1,573. The Manatees relocated to Kissimmee, to begin play in 2017 as the Florida Fire Frogs.

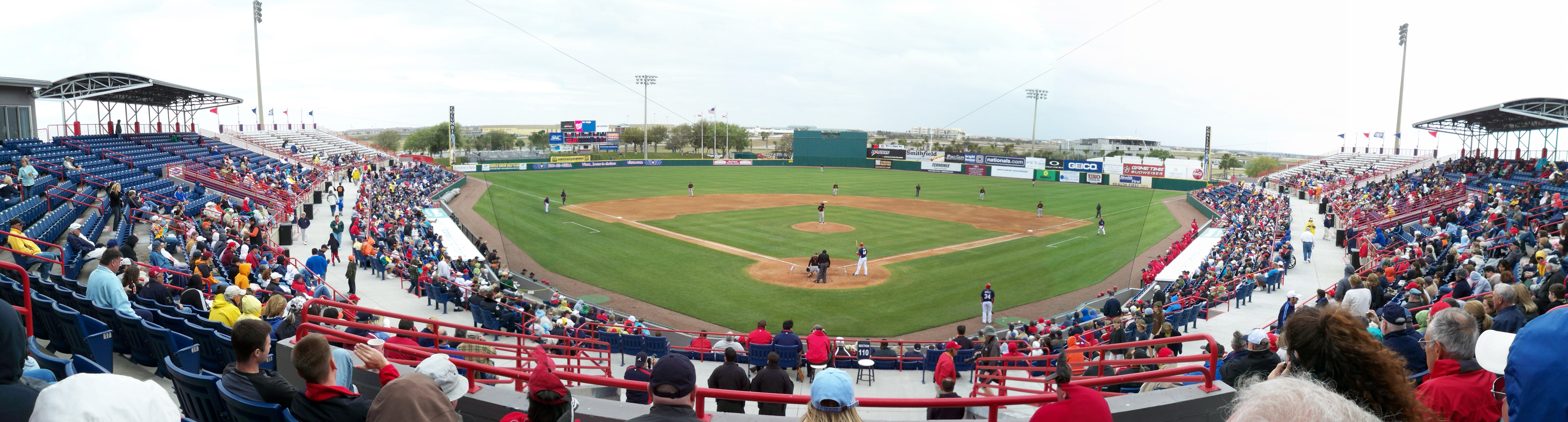
A baseball game at Space Coast Stadium seen from behind home plate on March 1, 2009.
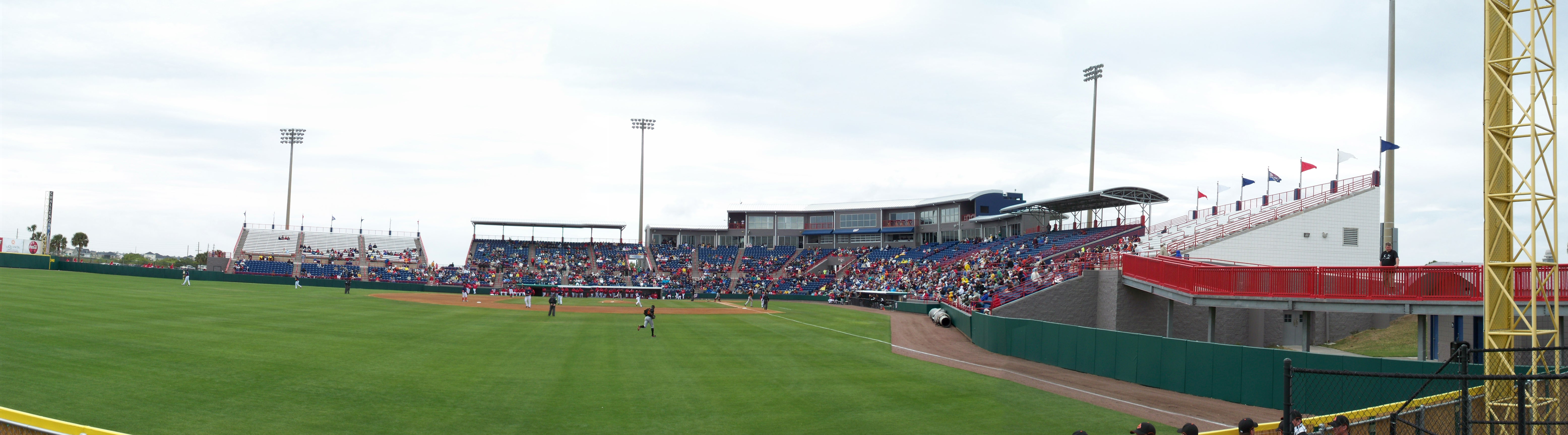
Space Coast Stadium during a baseball game on March 1, 2009, seen from left field near the visitors′ bullpen.

== USSSA Space Coast Complex ==
The departure of the Nationals and the Manatees after the 2016 season left Space Coast Stadium without a tenant. With the assistance of the Brevard County Board of County Commissioners, the United States Specialty Sports Association (USSSA) moved into the stadium and the surrounding spring training fields, moving its headquarters from Kissimmee to Space Coast Stadium and announcing plans to renovate the entire complex, using US$22 million of its own and US$10 million contributed by Brevard County. USSSA plans to make the complex into an all-turf venue that will host a variety of sports and sports tournaments — advertised by USSSA as "the youth sports capital of the world" — and serve as a center for amateur baseball and softball. Plans called for renovation work to begin in January 2017 and to be complete in the fall of 2017. The new complex, renamed the USSSA Space Coast Complex, will include a renovated Space Coast Stadium with 8,100 seats, 11 suites, a video board, and a turf field for both baseball and softball; a 225-foot (69 m) "Championship Field" with video board; four 225-foot (69 m) NCAA-softball-regulation turf fields; four 325-foot (99 m) baseball/softball fields; four 385-foot (117 m) NCAA-regulation turf baseball fields; a 175-foot (53 m) "Championship Field" for players aged 8 and under with a video board; an 18,000-square-foot (1,700 m^{2}) indoor facility for training, rehabilitation, and clinics; improved lighting; and two new concessions. The entire complex will include 1.3 million square feet (120,000 m^{2}) of turf. A groundbreaking ceremony for the renovation project took place at Space Coast stadium on April 27, 2017.

In 2017, Space Coast Stadium became the home field of a professional women's fast-pitch softball team organized by USSSA, USSSA Pride, a National Pro Fastpitch team which played its first game there on June 8, 2017.

The following year, the Viera High School Hawks baseball team began playing their home games at Space Coast Stadium. The Stadium has since been used for high school baseball and football playoff games, and for graduation ceremonies for several Brevard County Public Schools high schools including Viera High.
