= India women's national baseball team =

Information
- Country: India
- Federation: Amateur Baseball Federation of India
- Confederation: Baseball Federation of Asia

WBSC ranking
- Current: 13 ▼2 (31 December 2025)

Women's World Cup
- Appearances: 2 (first in 2008)
- Best result: 7th

Women's Asian Cup
- Appearances: 3 (first in 2017)
- Best result: 5th

The India women's national baseball team is the team that represents India in international-level baseball tournaments. It is under by the Amateur Baseball Federation of India and a member of the Baseball Federation of Asia.

In 2004, India participated in the Women's Baseball World Series. The team was also scheduled to participate in the 2004 Women's Baseball World Cup but withdrew before the tournament. India made its debut in the Women's Baseball World Cup in 2008.

== Events ==
=== Women's Baseball World Cup ===
Year	Venue	Rank	W	L	RF	RA	RD
2008	(Japan) Matsuyama	7th	1	4	15	63	-48
2016	(Japan) Gijang	11th	1	7	28	98	-70

=== Women's Baseball Asian Cup ===
Year	Venue	Rank	W	L	RF	RA	RD
2017	Hong Kong	5th	1	4	14	57	-43
2019	(China) Zhongshan	7th	1	4	47	54	-7
2023	Hong Kong	7th	3	4	54	62	-8
2025	(China) Hangzhou	9th	5	5	60	73	-13

== Notable players ==
- Ashritha Reddy
- BMR Vinila
- Ramya Reddy
- Shaheen Begum
- M. Vasanthi

== See also ==
- India men's national baseball team
- Baseball in India
