= Sai Tso Wan Recreation Ground =

Recreation ground in Hong Kong

Coordinates: 22.3046°N 114.2325°E

- Traditional Chinese: 晒草灣遊樂場
- Simplified Chinese: 晒草湾游乐场
Transcriptions
Standard Mandarin
- Hanyu Pinyin: Shài Cǎo Wān Yóulèchǎng
Yue: Cantonese
- Jyutping: saai3 cou2 waan1 jau4 lok6 coeng4

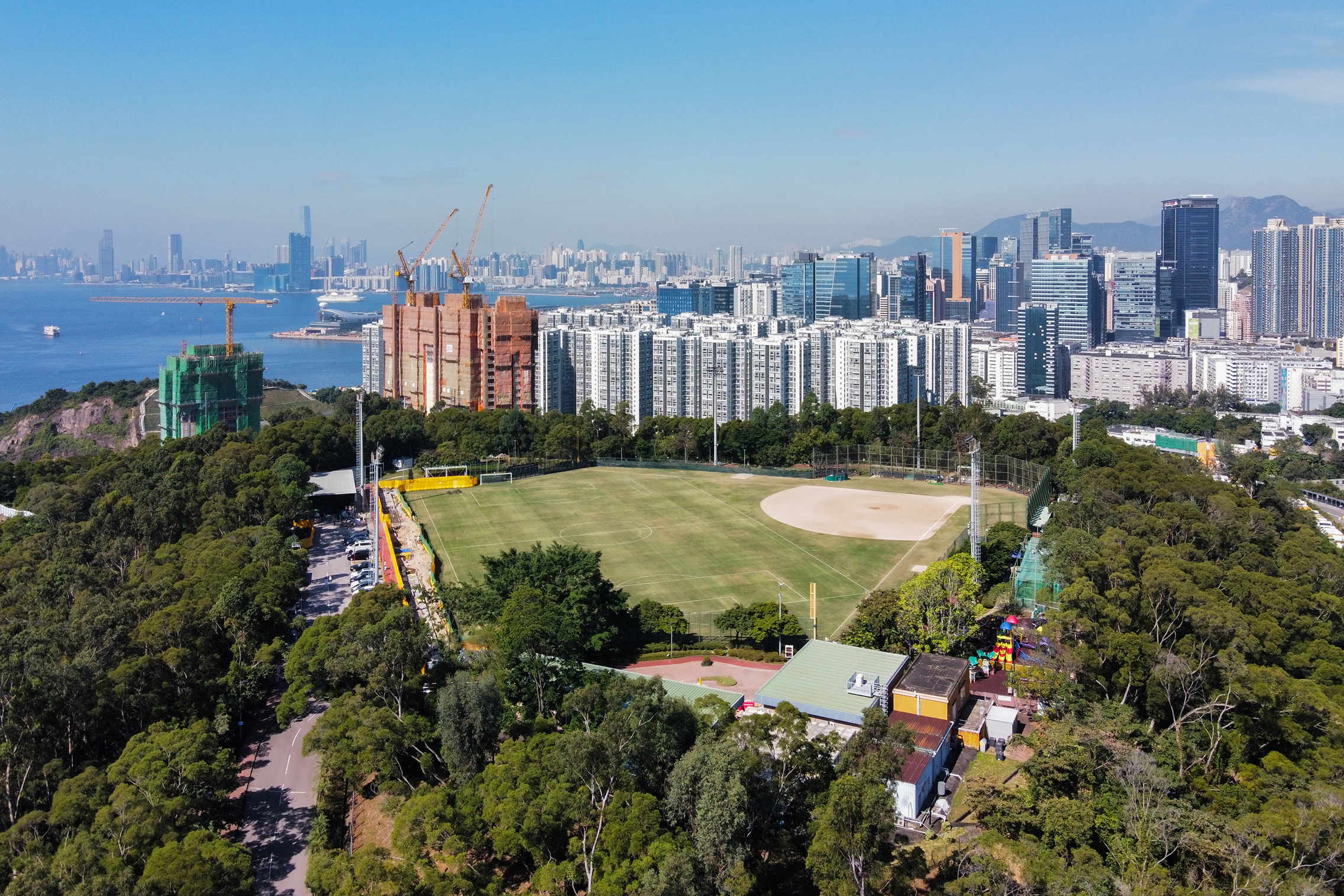
Sai Tso Wan Recreation Ground.

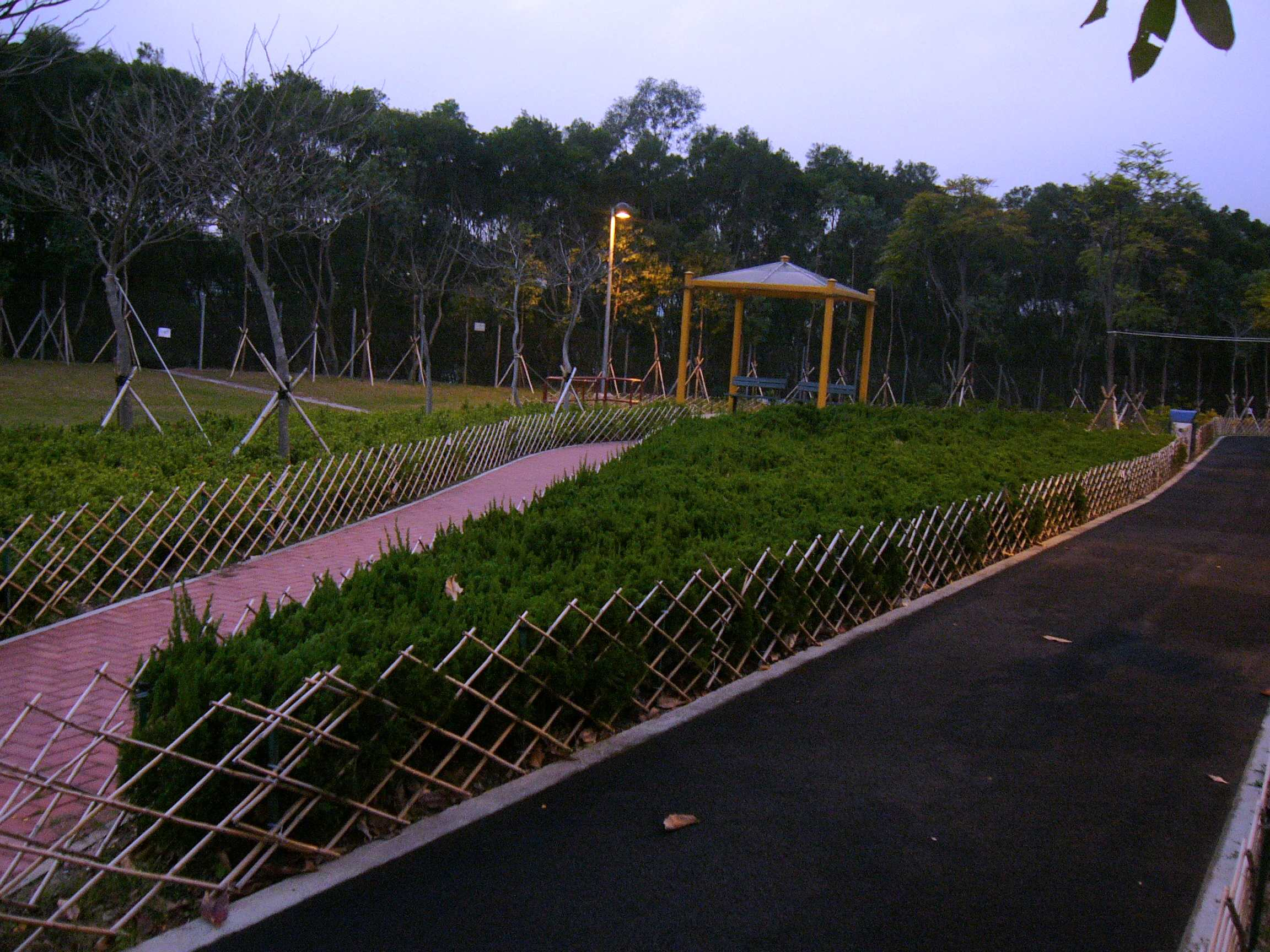
Sai Tso Wan Recreation Ground, evening view

Sai Tso Wan Recreation Ground (Chinese: 晒草灣遊樂場) is a multi-purpose playground in Sai Tso Wan, Kwun Tong District, in eastern Kowloon, Hong Kong. It is the first permanent recreational facility built on a landfill in the city.

== History ==
From 1978 to 1981, the knoll currently occupied by Sai Tso Wan Recreation Ground was known as Sai Tso Wan Landfill. The landfill served eastern Kowloon. During its operation, the landfill received approximately 1.6 million tonnes of domestic waste and commercial waste. Rubbish in the landfill was stacked up to 65 metres (213 ft) high. After its closure in 1981, it was sealed with soil.

== Construction ==
The ground was built from 1995 to 2004 from the former Sai Tso Wan Landfill. During the construction, the former landfill underwent a series of restoration works, which included the building of a final capping layer for prevention of leakage, a landfill gas control system for utilisation of methane gas generated from the decomposed rubbish, and a leachate management system.

Sai Tso Wan Recreation Ground was commissioned on 30 April 2004. The ground has a multi-purpose sand-based, grass pitch which can be used for baseball and football activities, two (2) baseball batting cages, a children's playground, a jogging track, two changing rooms and a management office. Unlike most urban areas which relies mainly on electric supply, the ground is powered by wind turbines, solar cells and energy generated from combustion of methane gas.

== Location ==
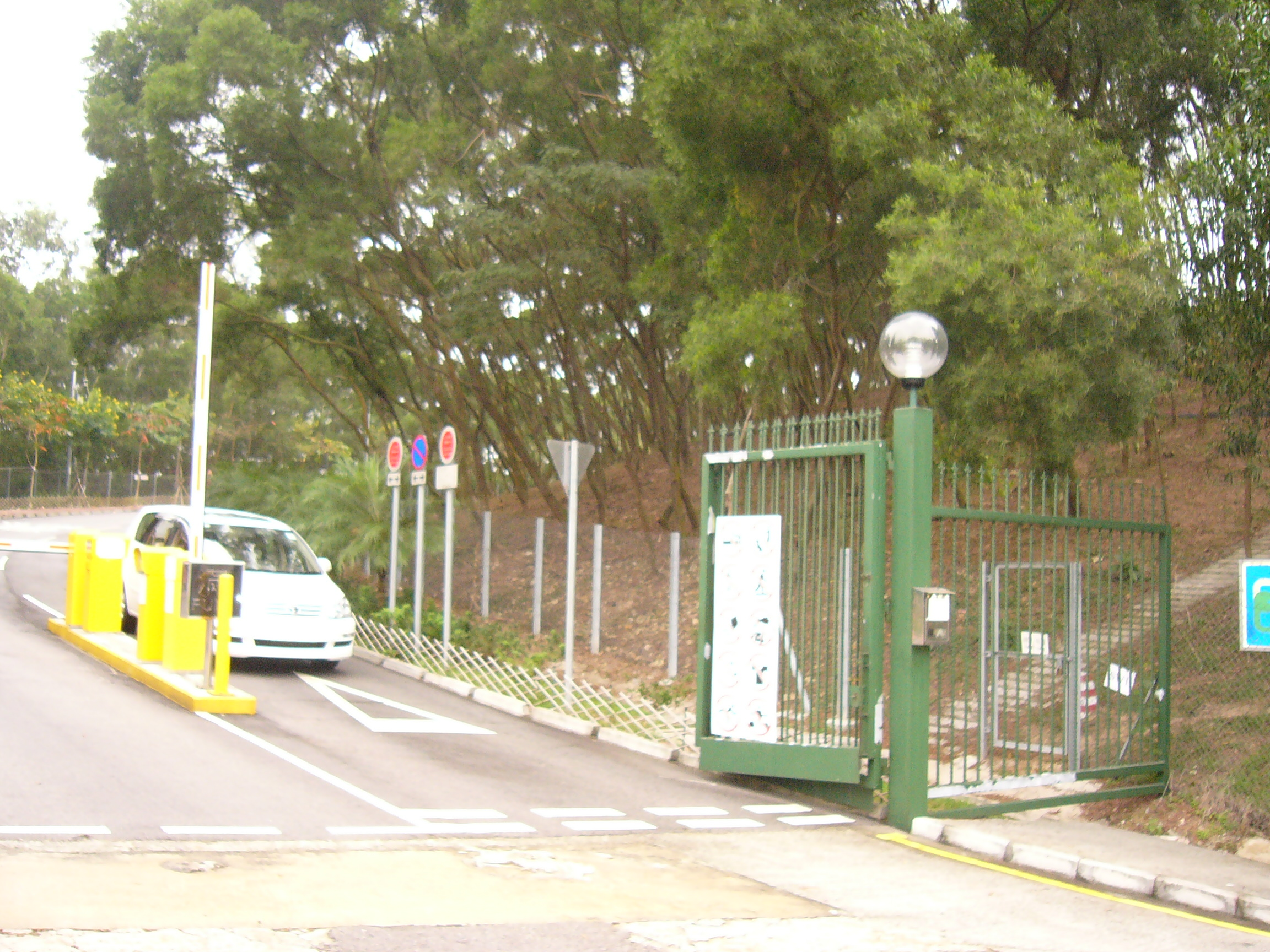
Sin Fat Road near Sai Tso Wan Recreation Ground

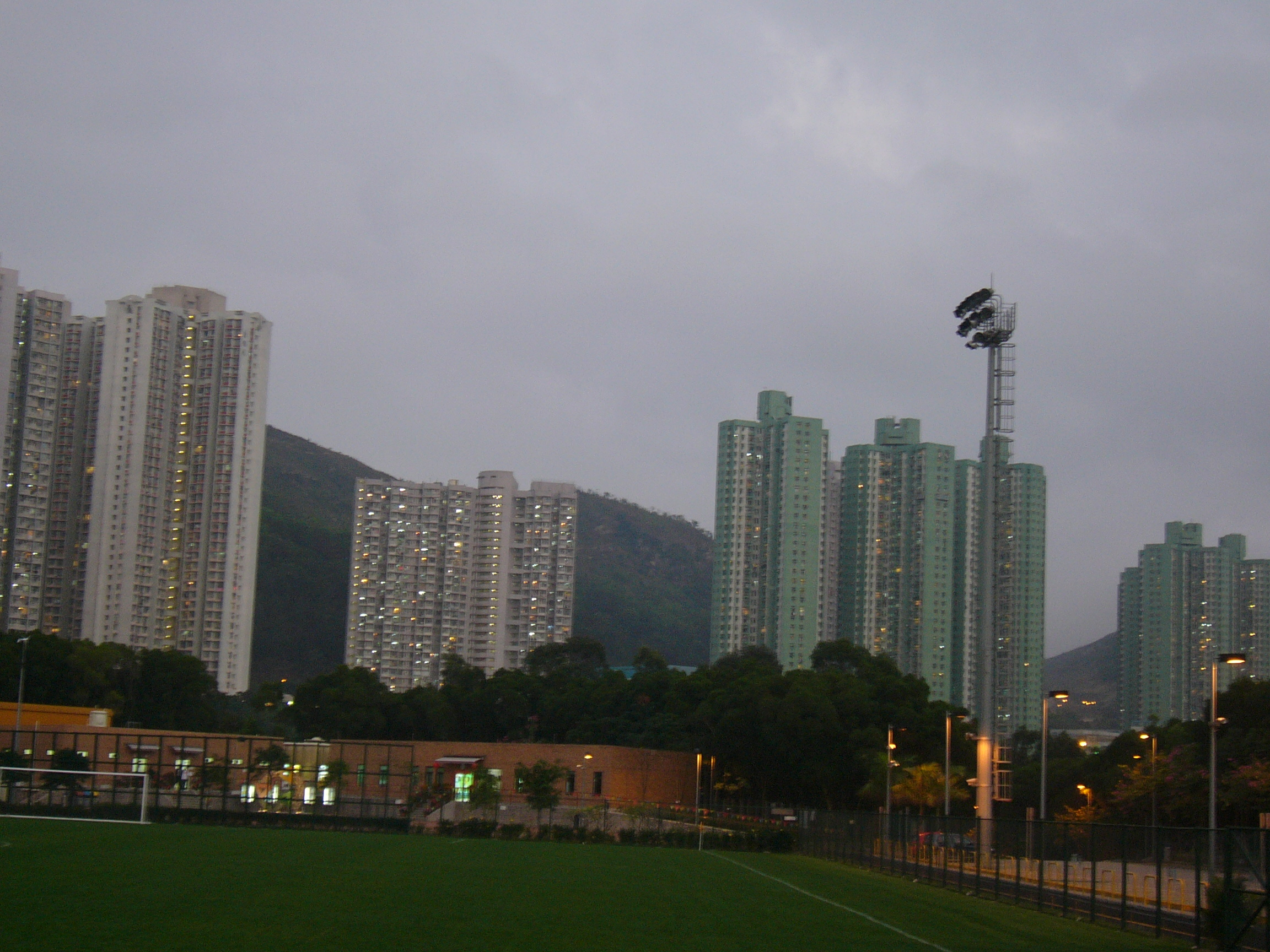
Its proximity to Lam Tin District made the ground a common sporting destination of Lam Tin residents.

Located adjacent to Lam Tin MTR station, the ground is a common sporting destination of many residents in Lam Tin.

== Facilities ==
The recreation ground consists of a multi-purpose grass pitch for both football and baseball, two batting cages for baseball practising, a children's play area, a jogging track and a number ancillary facilities, including male and female bathrooms and an office. The ground is a training venue for the national squad of the Hong Kong Baseball Association.

The ground is open from 7:00 am to 11:00 pm daily. Near its entrance is a main gate which has both a pedestrian ramp and a driveway, including an electric gate for the car park.

== Environmental measures ==
Sai Tso Wan Recreation Ground was built in part to promote environmental protection in Hong Kong. Therefore, it was built with a number of features for environmental protection.

Wind turbines generate electricity by wind, which can either be used directly or stored in batteries for later use. Most electricity generated from the turbines is used for street lighting.

Solar panels in the recreation ground absorb sunlight during sunny days and convert the energy into electricity. The electricity generated from solar panels is first stored in batteries, and then used to power the fluorescent lights and electric fans in the reception area.

Surface water, including rainwater, collected from the facility is drained, recycled and then used to irrigate the turf of the ground.

Rubbersoil, a recycled, lightweight and porous material made from cement and shredded old tyres, is used as a sub-base material of the facility. Safety mats in the ground is also derived from used tyres.

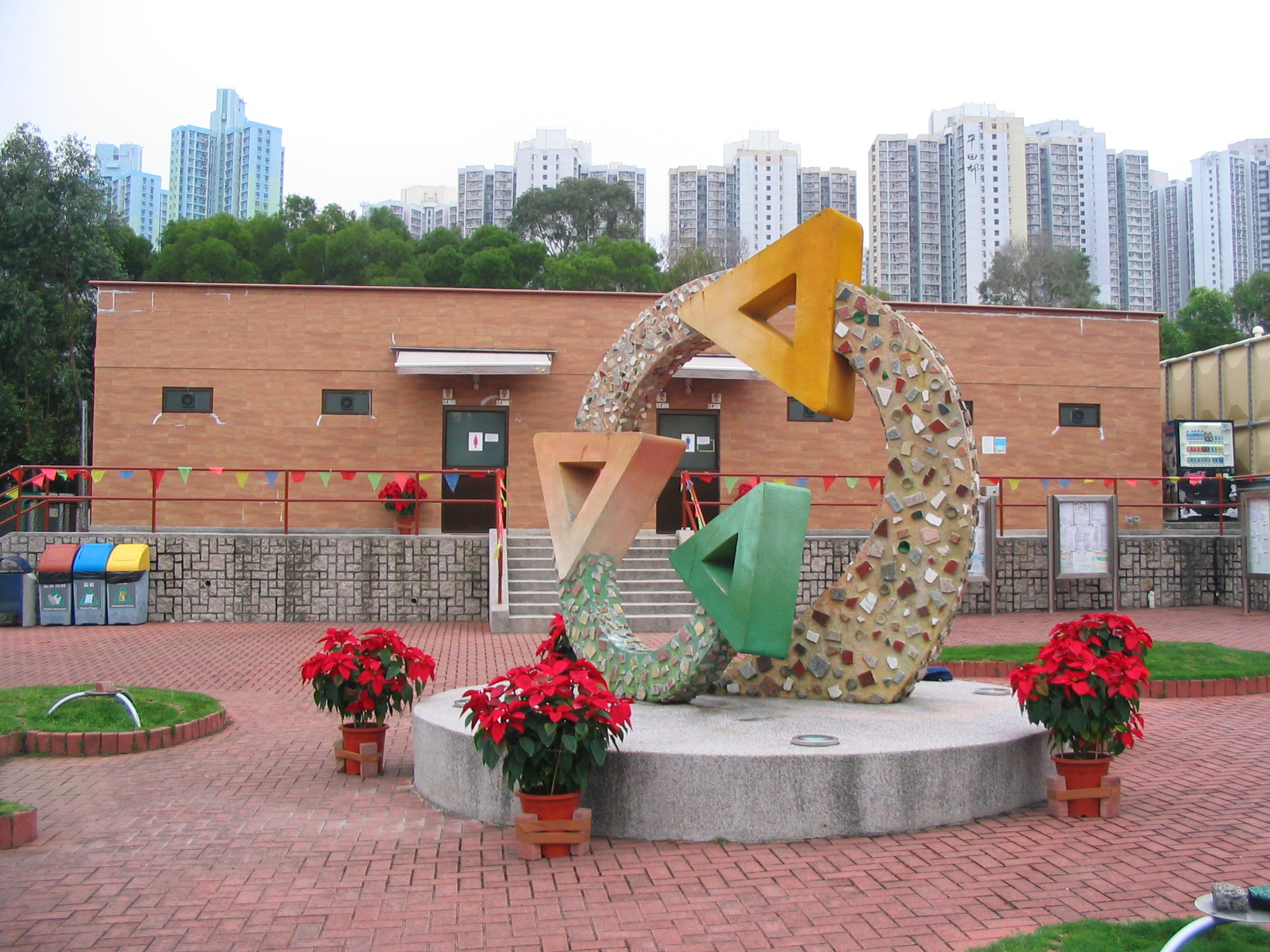
Sai Tso Wan Park statue.

A statue made from cement, crushed construction waste and glass pieces was erected in front of the ground's office as a landmark of the ground.

== See also ==
- Waste management in Hong Kong
- Kwai Chung Park
- Jordan Valley Park
