= Women's Baseball World Cup =

International women's baseball tournament

- Current season, competition or edition: 2027 Women's Baseball World Cup
- Sport: Baseball
- Founded: 2004; 22 years ago
- No. of teams: 12 (finals)
- Continent: International
- Most recent champion: Japan (2024)
- Most titles: Japan (7 titles)

The Women's Baseball World Cup is an international tournament in which national women's baseball teams from around the world compete. Through its 2012 edition, it was sanctioned by the International Baseball Federation; following the 2013 merger of the IBAF with the International Softball Federation, subsequent tournaments are sanctioned by the World Baseball Softball Confederation (WBSC). In the nine times it has been held, the tournament has been won twice by the United States and seven consecutive times by Japan in 2008, 2010, 2012, 2014, 2016, 2018 and 2024.

== History ==
The inaugural Women's Baseball World Cup was held in Edmonton, Canada from July 30 to August 8, 2004 after having been chartered by the International Baseball Federation in 2002. Before this tournament the only other international women's baseball tournament was the Women's Baseball World Series, which usually involved only three or four nations, usually Australia, Canada, Japan and occasionally the USA.

== Competition format ==
All competing nations played one game versus each opponent. The top four teams advanced to the semifinals. Ties in standings were broken by head-to-head record. The first place team played versus the fourth place team and the second place team played the third place team. The semifinal losers then played the bronze medal game, with the winner earning third place and the loser receiving fourth place. The semifinal winners played in the finals, with the winner earning first place and the loser receiving second place. All regulation games are seven innings in length with the exception of the mercy rule, which applied to a 10-run lead after 5 innings or a 12-run lead after 4 innings.

== Results ==
Ed.	Years	Final hosts	Finalists			Semi-finalists			Teams
Ed.	Years	Final hosts	Champions	Score	Runners-up	3rd place	Score	4th place	Teams
1	2004; Details	(Canada); Edmonton	United States	2 – 0	Japan	Canada	8 – 3	Australia	5
2	2006; Details	(Taiwan); Taipei	United States	round-robin	Japan	Canada	round-robin	Australia	7
3	2008; Details	(Japan); Matsuyama	Japan	11 – 3	Canada	United States	2 – 1	Australia	8
4	2010; Details	(Venezuela); Maracay (Note: Originally, the final round was supposed to be held at José Antonio Casanova Stadium in Caracas, but due to the 2010 Women's Baseball World Cup shooting incident, the International Baseball Federation and the organizers of the tournament decided to reschedule the games at Estadio José Perez Colmenares in Maracay.)	Japan	13 – 3 (F/5)	Australia	United States	15 – 5 (F/6)	Venezuela	11
5	2012; Details	(Canada); Edmonton	Japan	3 – 0	United States	Canada	17 – 13	Australia	8
6	2014; Details	(Japan); Miyazaki	Japan	3 – 0	United States	Australia	3 – 2	Canada	8
7	2016; Details	(South Korea); Busan	Japan	10 – 0	Canada	Venezuela	4 – 3	Chinese Taipei (Note: The Republic of China (Taiwan) is recognised as Chinese Taipei by WBSC and the majority of international organisations it participates in due to political considerations and Cross-Strait relations with the People's Republic of China.)	12
8	2018; Details	(United States); Viera, Florida	Japan	6 – 0	Chinese Taipei	Canada	8 – 5	United States	12
	2021; Details	(Mexico); Tijuana	Originally scheduled to be held in 2020, but cancelled due to the COVID-19 pandemic.						12
9	2024; Details	(Canada); Thunder Bay	Japan	11 – 6	United States	Canada	4 – 2	Mexico	12
10	2027; Details	(United States); Rockford							12

== Medal table ==
Rank	Nation	Gold	Silver	Bronze	Total
1	Japan	7	2	0	9
2	United States	2	3	2	7
3	Canada	0	2	5	7
4	Australia	0	1	1	2
5	Chinese Taipei	0	1	0	1
6	Venezuela	0	0	1	1
Totals (6 entries)		9	9	9	27

== Participating nations ==
Host country

Nation	2004	2006	2008	2010	2012	2014	2016	2018	~~2021~~	2024	Years
Australia	4	4	4	2nd place, silver medalist(s)	4	3rd place, bronze medalist(s)	5	7	~~Q~~	8	9
Canada	3rd place, bronze medalist(s)	3rd place, bronze medalist(s)	2nd place, silver medalist(s)	5	3rd place, bronze medalist(s)	4	2nd place, silver medalist(s)	3rd place, bronze medalist(s)	~~Q~~	3rd place, bronze medalist(s)	9
China									~~Q~~		0
Chinese Taipei	5	5	5	7	6	5	4	2nd place, silver medalist(s)	~~Q~~	6	9
Cuba		6		6	8		8	8	~~Q~~	9	6
Dominican Republic								6			1
France									~~Q~~	12	1
Hong Kong		6	8	11		7	10	11		10	7
India			7				11				2
Japan	2nd place, silver medalist(s)	2nd place, silver medalist(s)	1st place, gold medalist(s)	1st place, gold medalist(s)	1st place, gold medalist(s)	1st place, gold medalist(s)	1st place, gold medalist(s)	1st place, gold medalist(s)	~~Q~~	1st place, gold medalist(s)	9
Mexico									~~Q~~	4	1
Netherlands				10	7	8	9	12	~~Q~~		5
Pakistan							12				1
Philippines									~~Q~~		0
Puerto Rico				8				9		7	3
South Korea			6	9			6	10		11	5
United States	1st place, gold medalist(s)	1st place, gold medalist(s)	3rd place, bronze medalist(s)	3rd place, bronze medalist(s)	2nd place, silver medalist(s)	2nd place, silver medalist(s)	7	4	~~Q~~	2nd place, silver medalist(s)	9
Venezuela				4	5	6	3rd place, bronze medalist(s)	5	~~Q~~	5	6
Nations	5	7	8	11	8	8	12	12	12	12	

== See also ==
- Baseball awards#World
