= Chinese Taipei women's national baseball team =

Information
- Country: Taiwan (competes as Chinese Taipei)
- Federation: Chinese Taipei Baseball Association
- Confederation: Baseball Federation of Asia
- Team Colors: White, Blue, Red

WBSC ranking
- Current: 5 ▼3 (31 December 2024)

Women's World Cup
- Appearances: 9 (first in 2004)
- Best result: (silver) 2nd (1 time, in 2018)

Women's Asian Cup
- Appearances: 3 (first in 2017)
- Best result: (silver) 2nd (3 times, most recent in 2023)

The Chinese Taipei women's national baseball team is the national women's baseball team of Taiwan and is governed by the Chinese Taipei Baseball Association. It represents the nation in women's baseball international competition. The team is a member of the Baseball Federation of Asia, and currently ranks fifth in the WBSC World Rankings.

== Tournament record ==
=== Women's Baseball World Cup ===
Women's Baseball World Cup record
Year	Round	Position	Pld	W	L	RS	RA
(Canada) 2004	Group Stage	5th	4	0	4	12	23
(Taiwan) 2006	Round-robin	5th	6	3	3	37	19
(Japan) 2008	Group Stage	5th	5	3	2	43	26
(Venezuela) 2010	1st Round	7th	4	1	3	20	16
(Canada) 2012	1st Round	6th	7	3	4	33	55
(Japan) 2014	1st Round	5th	3	1	2	12	20
(South Korea) 2016	Bronze Medal	4th	8	4	4	41	28
(United States) 2018	Finals	(silver) 2nd	9	6	3	59	21
(Mexico) 2021	Cancelled due to the COVID-19 pandemic						
(Canada) (Japan) 2024	Finals	6th	10	4	6	61	55
Total	Runners-up	9/10	56	25	31	-	-

=== Women's Baseball Asian Cup ===
Women's Baseball Asian Cup record
Year	Round	Position	Pld	W	L
(Hong Kong) 2017	Finals	2nd	5	4	1
(China) 2019	Finals	2nd	6	4	2
(Hong Kong) 2023	Finals	2nd	6	5	1
Total	Runners-up	3/3	17	13	4

== Uniform ==
2004 to 2012		2012 to present
Away	Home	Away	Home

== See also ==
- Chinese Taipei national baseball team
- Chinese Taipei Baseball Association
