= Hong Kong women's national baseball team =

Information
- Country: Hong Kong
- Federation: Baseball Association of Hong Kong, China
- Confederation: WBSC Asia

WBSC ranking
- Current: 8 (31 December 2025)

Women's Asian Cup
- Appearances: 4 (first in 2017)
- Best result: Third, in 2025

The Hong Kong women's national baseball team represents Hong Kong in women's international baseball competitions. The team is a member of the WBSC Asia.

The Baseball Association of Hong Kong, China, the team's governing body, has hosted a women's baseball tournament, the Phoenix Cup, starting in 2008.

== Tournament record ==
=== Women's World Cup ===
- 2024: Fifth place in Group A

=== Women's Baseball Asian Cup ===
- 2017 (host): Fourth place
- 2019: Sixth place
- 2023 (host): Fourth place
- 2025: Third place
