= Gordon Head Baseball Association =

- Sport: Baseball
- Founded: 1957
- No. of teams: 27
- Country: Canada
- Most recent champions: Cowichan Trading (Mosquito); Vantreights (Pee Wee)
- Website: http://www.gordonheadbaseball.ca

Gordon Head Baseball Association, located in the municipality of Saanich, just north of Victoria, British Columbia, provides a comprehensive baseball program for players from four to 100 years old, in eight separate divisions, including Blastball, Initiation, Novice, Mosquito, Pee Wee, Bantam, Midget and Junior Men's. Known as Gordon Head Little League from 1957 through 2002, when it became affiliated with Baseball B.C., Gordon Head Baseball Association incorporated Lambrick Park Baseball in 2012. The organization is a member of the British Columbia Minor Baseball Association (BCMBA) and, under the jurisdiction of the Greater Victoria Baseball Association (GVBA), plays locally in Lambrick Park. The current president is Steve Gaskin, and the chief umpire is Barry Whelan.

== History ==
- 2010 Pee Wee AA Black Sox - Carnarvon Blast tournament champions
- 2009 Mosquito "A" (Rebels), Island champions (seven players); Mosquito "AAA" (Venom), Island champions (one player)
- 2007 Pee Wee "A" (Tigers), Island silver medallists, provincial champions (nine players); Pee Wee "A" (Cougars), Island champions, provincial silver medallists (two players); Pee Wee "AAA" national bronze medallist (one player); Mosquito "AAA" Tier II (Raiders), provincial bronze medallists (six players); Mosquito "A" (Rebels), Island champions
- 2006 Pee Wee "AAA" national silver medallists (three players); Pee Wee "A" (Tigers), Island champions (one player); Pee Wee "A" (Cougars), provincial bronze medallists (three players); Mosquito "AAA" Tier 1 provincial silver medallists (seven players); Mosquito "AAA" Tier 2 Island silver medallists (six players)
- 2005 Pee Wee "A" Island champions, 3rd at Provincials (nine players); Mosquito "AAA" Island champions, 4th at Provincials (seven players)
- 2004 Mosquito "A" provincial champions (six players)
- 2002 Pee Wee "A" provincial champions (three players)
- 2001 Little League Canadian runners-up, provincial champions, 10-year-olds zone winners
- 2000 Little League provincial champions
- 1999 Little League provincial and Canadian champions
- 1978 Little League Island champions and provincial runners-up

== Distinguished Alumni ==
- Michael Saunders
- Steve Nash
- Martin Nash (soccer)
- Jeff Mallett
- Daryn Lansdell (Drafted 1986 by Philadelphia Phillies)
- Drew Farrell
