= Baseball PEI =

Canadian governing body for baseball

Baseball Prince Edward Island
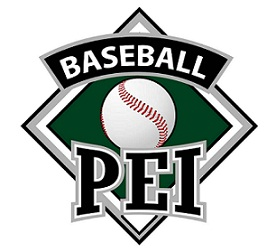
- Sport: Baseball
- Category: Provincial Level/County
- Jurisdiction: Prince Edward Island
- Abbreviation: Baseball PEI/ BPEI
- Founded: 1997; 29 years ago
- Affiliation: Baseball Canada
- Headquarters: Charlottetown
- Location: Charlottetown Enman Crescent
- President: Walter MacEwen
- CEO: Randy Byrne
- Sponsor: Sport Canada, Baseball Canada

Official website
- baseballpei.ca
- (Canada)
- (Prince Edward Island)

Baseball PEI is the provincial governing body for baseball in Prince Edward Island. It is a member of Baseball Canada and Baseball Atlantic.

== History of baseball on Prince Edward Island ==
Baseball was introduced to Prince Edward Island during the late 19th century and early 20th century, often by natives of Prince Edward Island who went to the United States to work, returning to or visiting Prince Edward Island. The first provincial championship was in 1896 when Charlottetown defeated the Pisquid club. After this point, the Maritime Amateur Athletic Association loosely organized provincial play-downs and championships to determine those teams representing Prince Edward Island at Maritime championships. On Prince Edward Island, organized and semi-organized leagues formed by the 1920s in various pockets of Prince Edward Island, especially in Kings County, Charlottetown, Summerside and western Prince County, and the health and popularity of these leagues ebbed-and-flowed through the pre- and post-war decades.

In 1964–65, the Prince Edward Island Amateur Baseball Association (PEIABA) was formed to take over the organizing of provincial play-downs and championships in order to determine the Prince Edward Island representatives at Maritime and National championships. Shortly after this time, the PEIABA began organizing county leagues. In 1969, the PEIABA took the responsibility of organizing and fielding a provincial representative for the quadrennial Canada Summer Games; and in 1989, also took on the responsibility of fielding the PEI Youth Selects, the Prince Edward Island representative at the Baseball Canada Cup. After this point, all teams that represented Prince Edward Island in a Maritime, Atlantic and National championship were determined by the PEIABA.

By the mid-1990s, the provincial government and other sectors required more organization from the PEIABA. On 12 September 1997, the PEIABA became a not-for-profit organization within the province of Prince Edward Island and changed its name to "Baseball PEI". Since that time, Baseball PEI has grown significantly. On top of running Elimination tournaments, provincial jamborees and championships, and fielding and organizing provincial teams, Baseball PEI now offers province-wide leagues from 9U/Junior Mosquito to 21U/Junior (with the Intermediate Kings County Baseball League also a member). Baseball PEI also is heavily involved with grassroots baseball; it assists associations with the set-up of Rally Cap and runs Rally Cap Jamborees. As well, Baseball PEI has the Summer Clinic Program, where teams and members of Baseball PEI can have two clinicians come out and run a clinic on a baseball skill (in 2018, there were 68 clinics run across Prince Edward Island).

Due to Baseball PEI's efforts at the grassroots level, and its dedication to improving the skills and enjoyment of its members, it has been named Baseball Canada's "Province of the Year" in 2013 (in which it shared with Baseball Ontario) and in 2015.

== Mission statement ==
Baseball PEI is a non-profit organization that continuously enables the development of baseball skills and knowledge among youth across Prince Edward Island.

== Structure ==
=== Board of directors ===
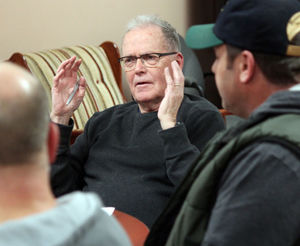
President of Baseball PEI, Don LeClair

Baseball PEI has a Board of Directors that makes rules, policies and procedures concerning the managing of affairs, discipline, and operation of Baseball PEI teams, associations and competitions. The Board of Directors of Baseball PEI is as follows:

- President: Walter MacEwen
- Director of Administration/Skill Development: Spencer Myers
- Director of Provincial Teams: Janet Cameron
- Director of 11U Competitions: Darrel Kirev
- Director of 13U Competitions: John Munro
- Director of 15U and 18U Competitions: Allison Macdonald
- PEIBUA Supervisor of Officials (ex-officio): Kent Walker
- Executive Director (ex-officio): Randy Byrne

=== Associations ===
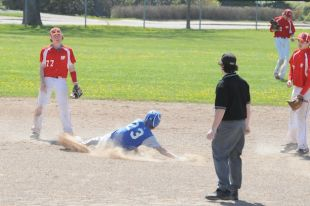
Slide at Queen Elizabeth Park, Summerside

There are eleven minor baseball associations across Prince Edward Island that make up Baseball PEI:

- Bedeque and Area Minor Baseball Association
- Cardigan and Area Minor Ball Association
- Charlottetown Area Baseball Association
- Cornwall and Area Minor Baseball Association
- Kensington Minor Baseball Association
- Northside Minor Baseball Association
- Sherwood/Parkdale Minor Baseball Association
- Souris Minor Baseball Association
- Stratford Minor Baseball Association
- Summerside and Area Minor Baseball Association
- Western Minor Baseball Association

=== "AAA" zones ===
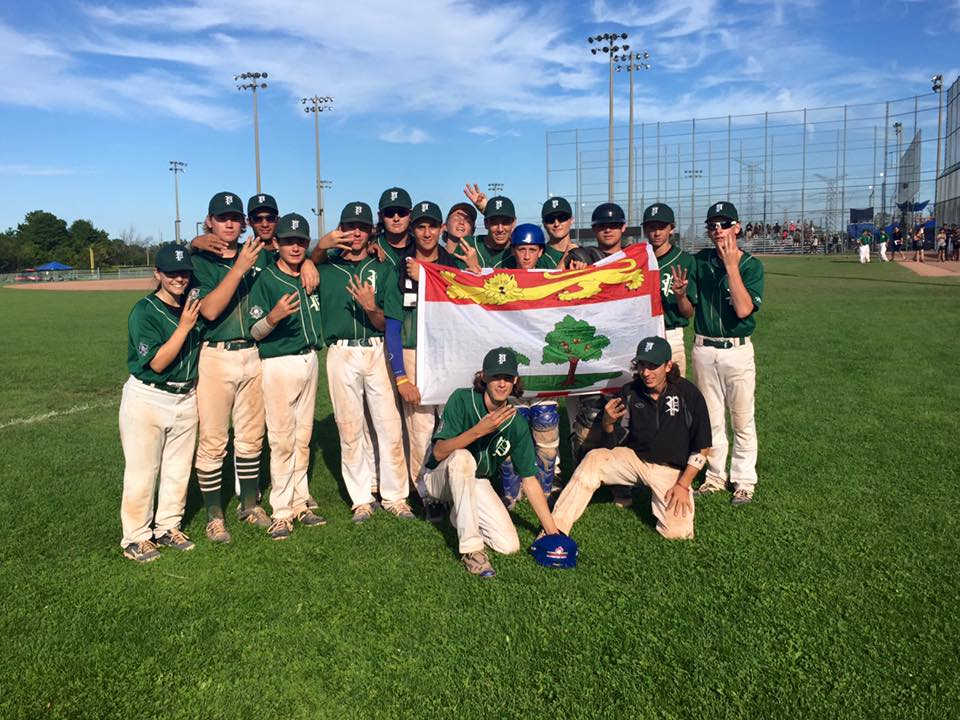
Charlottetown Bantam "AAA" Royals - 2015 Baseball Canada National 15U Championships Bronze Medallist

Each association is a member of one of four "AAA" zones across Prince Edward Island (each zone must have at least one "AAA" team in each age division each season).

- Eastern (Souris, Northside, Cardigan, Stratford)
- Capital District (Sherwood/Parkdale, Charlottetown)
- Mid-Isle (Cornwall, Kensington, Bedeque)
- Egmont (Summerside, Western)

== Leagues and competitions ==
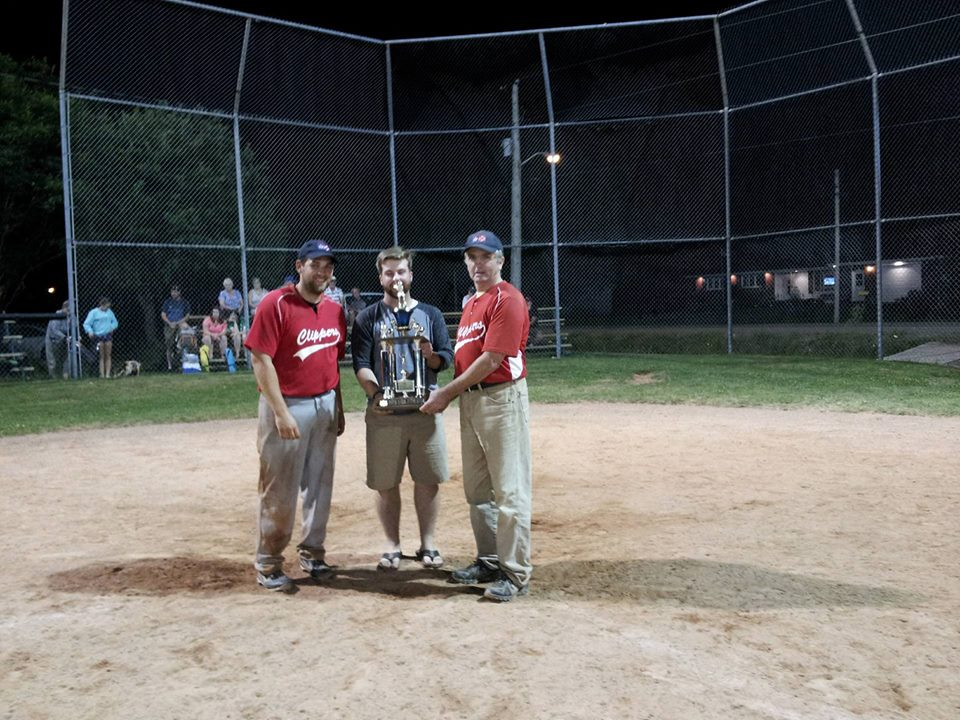
Morell/Cardigan Juniors being presented the league championship, 2015

Baseball PEI organizes and runs the following leagues:

- 9U/Junior Mosquito
- 11U "A", "AA", and "AAA"
- 13U "A", "AA", and "AAA"
- 15U "A", "AA" and "AAA"
- 18U "A" and "AA"
- 21U

Baseball PEI organizes and runs the following Provincial Jamboree/Championship.

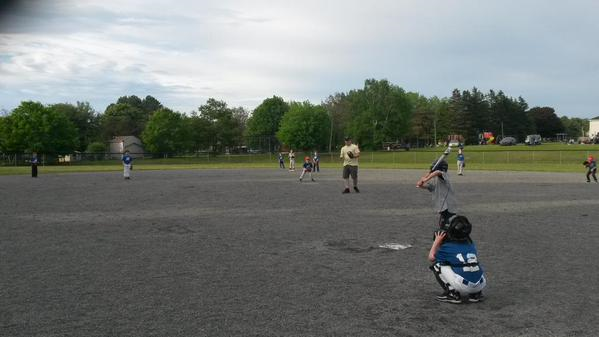
Junior Mosquito game

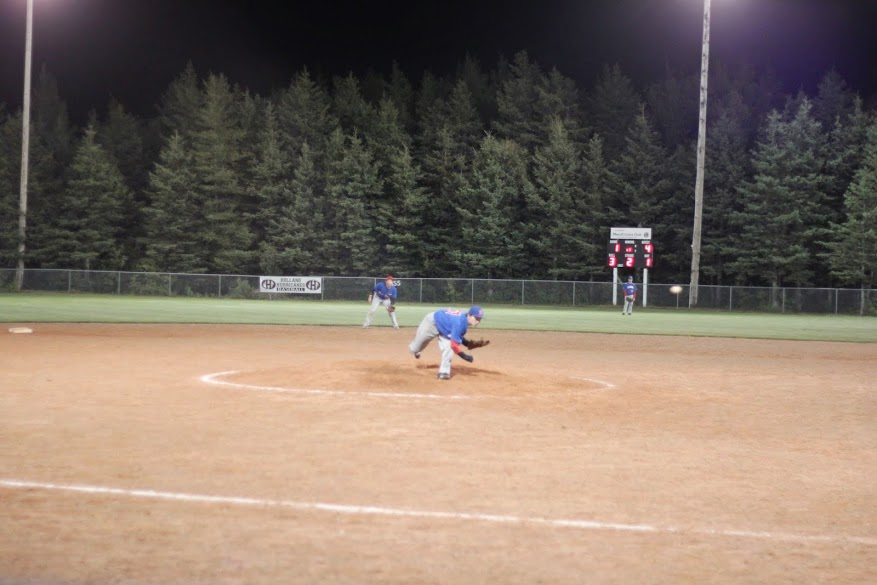
2014 Baseball PEI Provincial Midget Championships

- Rally Cap (Jamboree)
- 9U (Jamboree)
- 11U "A" (Jamboree)
- 11U "AA" (Provincial Championship)
- 11U "AAA" (Provincial Championship)
- 13U "A" (Provincial Championship)
- 13U "AA" (Provincial Championship)
- 13U "AAA" (Provincial Championship; winner is awarded The Mitch MacLean Memorial Trophy)
- 15U "A" (Provincial Championship)
- 15U "AA" (Provincial Championship)
- 15U"AAA" (Provincial Championship; winner is awarded The Tanner Craswell Memorial Trophy)
- 18U :A: (Provincial Championship)
- 18U "AA" (Provincial Championship; winner is awarded The J. Vernon Handrahan Trophy)
- 21U/Junior (Provincial Play-Offs)

== Grassroots Programming ==
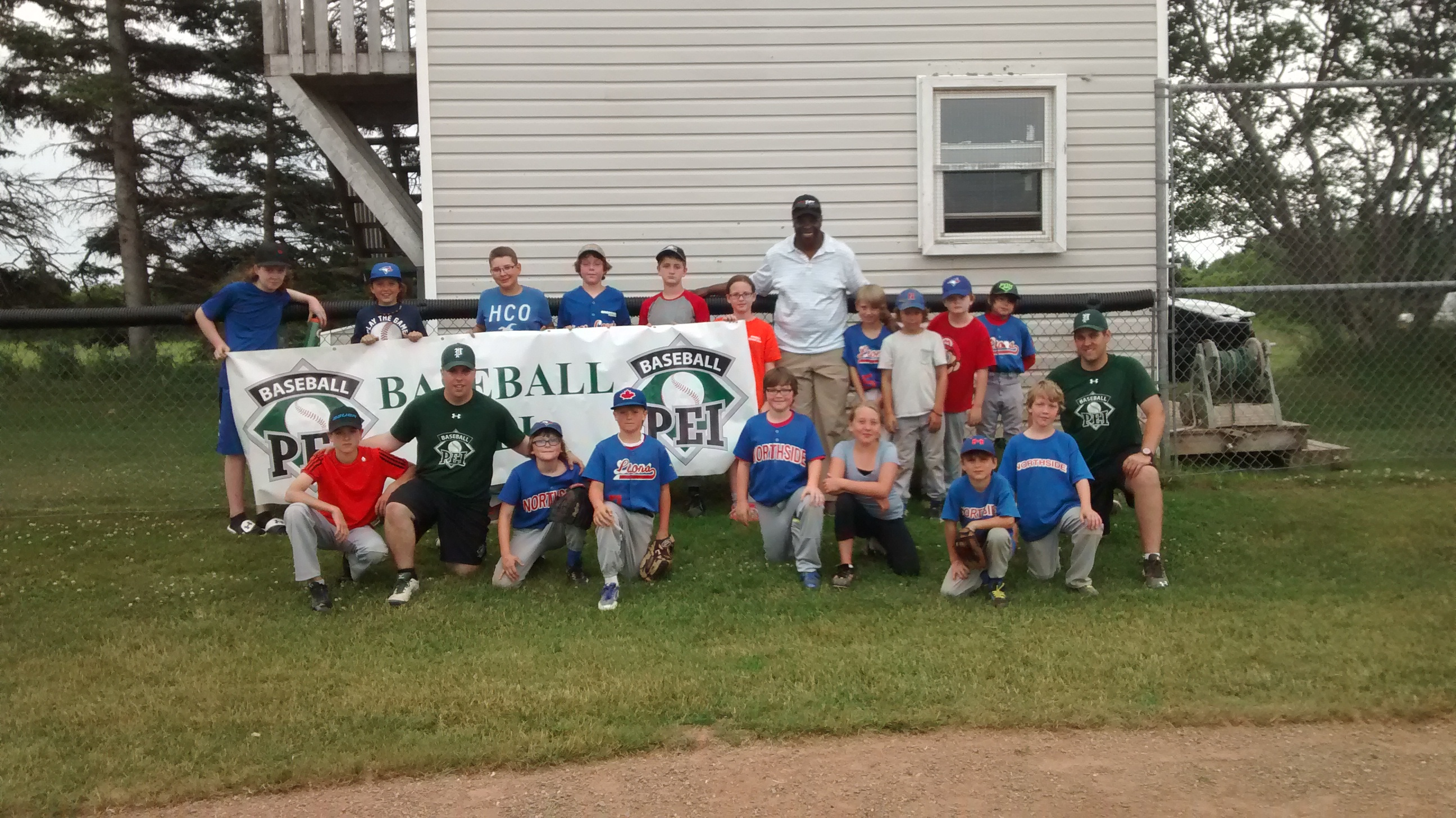
Baseball PEI Summer Clinics Program, Church Field, Morell

Baseball PEI is heavily invested with promoting grassroots development of players and coaches across Prince Edward Island. In the summer, their Summer Clinics Program runs clinics on hitting, throwing/pitching, fielding and other baseball fundamentals (as well as Rally Cap testing and the "My First Pitch" program) for teams and associations across Prince Edward Island. In 2018, there were 68 clinics ran across the province, mostly for players 11 and under, and in 2018, Baseball PEI hired three player clinicians. As well, Baseball PEI works very closely with its associations to offer the Rally Cap program, and runs Rally Cap jamborees in the latter part of August each year.

Other grassroots programs offered by Baseball PEI are the Winterball program (in partnership with schools across Prince Edward Island to distribute and implement over the past 10 years) and the Challenger program (in partnership with the Stratford Minor Baseball Association; this program is designed for players with a physical and/or mental disability).

== Provincial teams ==
Baseball PEI organizes and fields the following provincial teams each year:

- The PEI Youth Selects (representing Prince Edward Island at the 17U Baseball Canada Cup each year [except Canada Games' years])
- Provincial 13U Team (representing Prince Edward Island at the Baseball Canada National 13U Championships)
- Provincial 15U Team (representing Prince Edward Island at the Ray Carter Cup [Baseball Canada National 15U Championships])
- Provincial 16U Girls Team (representing Prince Edward Island at the Baseball Canada National 16U Girls Invitational Championships)
- Provincial 18U/Midget All-Stars (representing Prince Edward Island at the Baseball Canada National 18U Championships)
- Provincial 21U Team (representing Prince Edward Island at the Baseball Canada National 21U Championships)

== PEIBUA ==
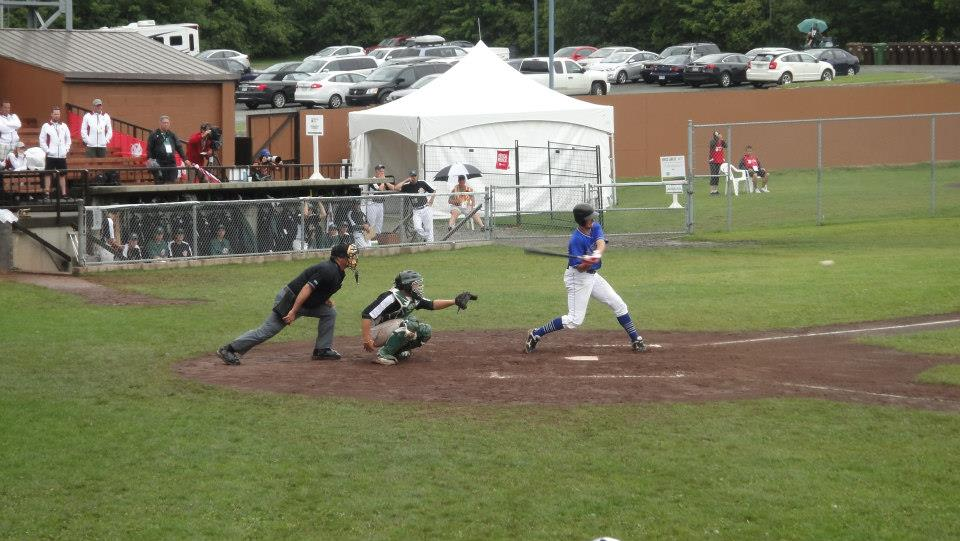
Kent Walter, PEIBUA Supervisor of Officials

All umpires used for Baseball PEI sanctioned-games are supplied by the Prince Edward Island Baseball Umpires' Association (the PEIBUA). The current Supervisor of Officials is Kent Walker. It is the PEIBUA's mandate to carry out all umpires' certification and recertification at the start of each season - usually in May - and to supply umpires for all Baseball PEI exhibition, tournament, regular season, Elimination and provincial championship games (as well as any Baseball Atlantic Championship games being held on Prince Edward Island).

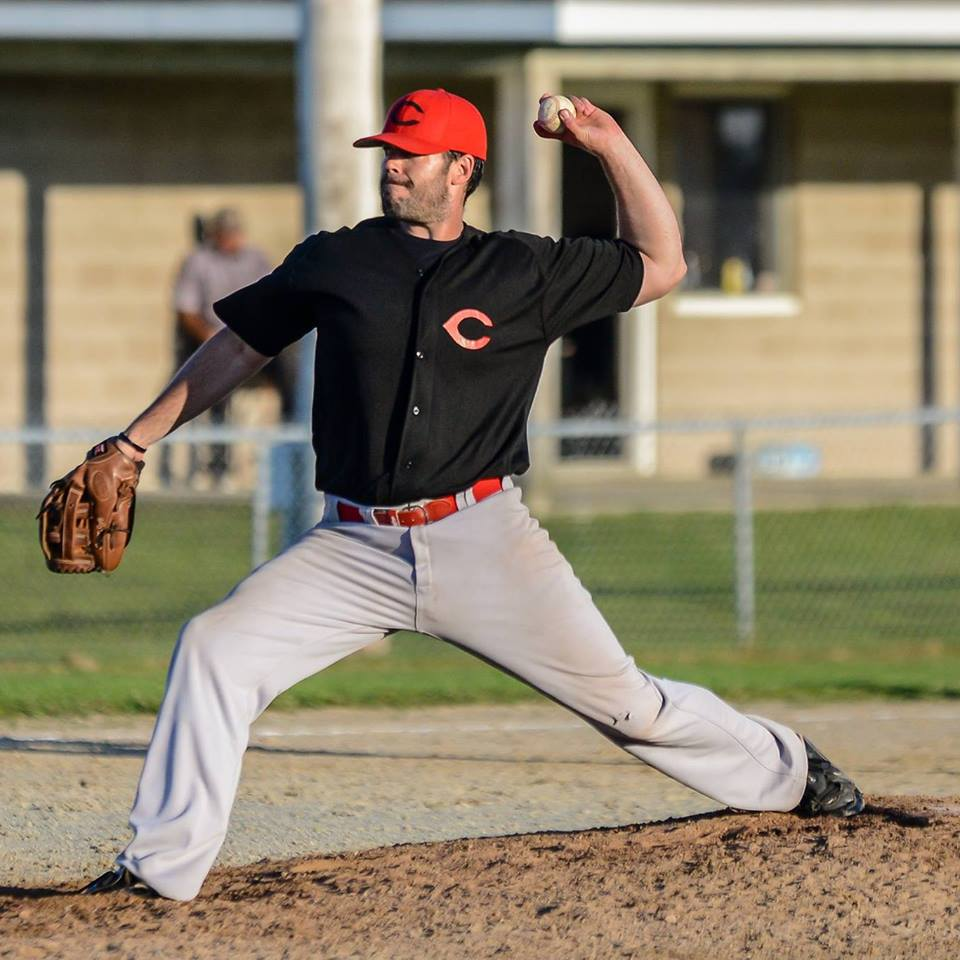
Troy Coffin, 2015 Baseball PEI Masters Athlete of the Year

== Baseball PEI Award winners ==
=== 2018 Baseball PEI Award winners ===
Award	Winner
Team of the Year	Capital District 13U "AAA" Islanders
Senior Male Athlete of the Year	Shawn MacDougall
Intercollegiate Athlete of the Year	JP Stevenson
Minor Junior (13U) Male Athlete of the Year	Graysen LaPorte
Major Junior (14-18) Male Athlete of the Year	Josh Myers
Junior Female Athlete of the Year	Selena Ford
Coach of the Year	Mark Arsenault
Volunteer Administrator of the Year	Tanner Doiron
Masters Athlete of the Year	Scott Harper
Senior Official of the Year	Jack McCabe
Junior Official of the Year	Owen Morrison
Baseball Canada National Grassroots Coach of the Year	Desi Doyle
Baseball Canada/MLB Volunteer of the Year	Nora Dorgan

=== 2017 Baseball PEI Award winners ===
Award	Winner
Team of the Year	Eastern 11U/Mosquito "AAA" Express
Senior Male Athlete of the Year	Jordan Stevenson
Intercollegiate Athlete of the Year	JP Stevenson
Junior Male Athlete of the Year	Logan MacDougall
Junior Female Athlete of the Year	Hannah LeClair
Coach of the Year	Darren MacEachern
Volunteer Administrator of the Year	Kris O'Brien
Masters Athlete of the Year	Desi Doyle
Senior Official of the Year	Lindsay Walker
Junior Official of the Year	Mitchell Schut
Brian Lewis Award	Brody McDonald
Baseball Canada National Grassroots Coach of the Year	Jamie Antle
Baseball Canada/MLB Volunteer of the Year	Blair Christopher

=== 2016 Baseball PEI Award winners ===
Award	Winner
Team of the Year	Capital District Mosquito "AAA" Islanders
Senior Male Athlete of the Year	Brody McDonald
Intercollegiate Athlete of the Year	Cole MacLaren
Junior Male Athlete of the Year	Kyle Pinksen
Junior Female Athlete of the Year	Ella Nicholson
Coach of the Year	Dale MacDougall
Volunteer Administrator of the Year	Tracy MacLean
Masters Athlete of the Year	Scott Harper
Senior Official of the Year	Kent Quigley
Junior Official of the Year	Brett McQuaid
Brian Lewis Award	Brody McDonald
Baseball Canada National Grassroots Coach of the Year	Randy Proud
Baseball Canada/MLB Volunteer of the Year	Karen MacIntyre

=== 2015 Baseball PEI Award winners ===
Award	Winner
Team of the Year	(tie) Charlottetown Bantam "AAA" Royals; Charlottetown Gaudet's Auto Body Islanders
Senior Male Athlete of the Year	Dillon Doucette
Intercollegiate Athlete of the Year	John Patrick Stevenson
Junior Male Athlete of the Year	Tyson McInnis
Junior Female Athlete of the Year	Tessa Hood
Coach of the Year	Bill Dow
Volunteer Administrator of the Year	Spencer Myers
Masters Athlete of the Year	Troy Coffin
Senior Official of the Year	David McQuaid
Junior Official of the Year	Dylan Noonan
Brian Lewis Award	Morgan MacLean
Baseball Canada National Grassroots Coach of the Year	Dale Martin
Baseball Canada/MLB Volunteer of the Year	Mike Cameron

=== 2014 Baseball PEI Award winners ===
Award	Winner
Team of the Year	Summerside Peewee "AAA" Chevys
Senior Male Athlete of the Year	Morgan MacLean
Intercollegiate Athlete of the Year	Brody McDonald
Junior Male Athlete of the Year	Kyle Pinksen
Junior Female Athlete of the Year	MacKenzie Pinet
Coach of the Year	Dave MacIsaac
Volunteer Administrator of the Year	Allison Macdonald
Masters Athlete of the Year	Scott Ellsworth
Senior Official of the Year	Mike Richards
Junior Official of the Year	Dylan Schut
Brian Lewis Award	Morgan MacLean
Baseball Canada National Grassroots Coach of the Year	John Munro
Baseball Canada/MLB Volunteer of the Year	Ian Clays

=== 2013 Baseball PEI Award winners ===
Award	Winner
Team of the Year	Cornwall Quik-Stop Midget Cougars
Senior Male Athlete of the Year	Dillon Doucette
Intercollegiate Athlete of the Year	Brody McDonald
Junior Male Athlete of the Year	Matt Barlow
Junior Female Athlete of the Year	MacKenzie Pinet
Coach of the Year	David McQuaid
Volunteer Administrator of the Year	Dave MacIsaac
Masters Athlete of the Year	Josh Coffin
Senior Official of the Year	Kevin McKenna
Junior Official of the Year	Marc Gunning
Baseball Canada National Grassroots Coach of the Year	Joe Carroll
Baseball Canada/MLB Volunteer of the Year	Walter MacEwen

=== 2012 Baseball PEI Award winners ===
Award	Winner
Team of the Year	Charlottetown Midget Royals
Senior Male Athlete of the Year	Andrew Macdonald
Intercollegiate Athlete of the Year	Harrison Carmichael
Junior Male Athlete of the Year	Willem Slauenwhite
Coach of the Year	David McQuaid
Volunteer Administrator of the Year	Wayne MacIsaac
Official of the Year	Larry Allen
Baseball Canada National Grassroots Coach of the Year	Steve LeClair
Baseball Canada/MLB Volunteer of the Year	Reg Conohan

=== 2011 Baseball PEI Award winners ===
Award	Winner
Team of the Year	Morell Chevies
Senior Male Athlete of the Year	Andrew Macdonald
Junior Male Athlete of the Year	Matt Barlow
Coach of the Year	Allison Macdonald
Volunteer Administrator of the Year	Mike Cameron
Official of the Year	Taylor Albert
Baseball Canada/MLB Volunteer of the Year	Wayne MacIsaac

=== 2010 Baseball PEI Award winners ===
Award	Winner
Team of the Year	Summerside Bantam "AAA" Chevys
Senior Male Athlete of the Year	Scott Ellsworth
Junior Male Athlete of the Year	Mitch MacLean
Coach of the Year	Nick Hann
Volunteer Administrator of the Year	Ian Clays
Official of the Year	Terry MacLeod
Baseball Canada/MLB Volunteer of the Year	Karen MacIntyre

=== 2009 Baseball PEI Award winners ===
Award	Winner
Team of the Year	PEI Midget All-Stars
Senior Male Athlete of the Year	Stephen Birt
Junior Male Athlete of the Year	Neil Sherren
Female Athlete of the Year	Jessica Pendergast
Coach of the Year	(tie) Desi Doyle, Bob Doyle, Keith Craswell
Volunteer Administrator of the Year	Walter MacEwen
Official of the Year	Terry MacLeod

=== 2008 Baseball PEI Award winners ===
Award	Winner
Team of the Year	Cardigan Peewee "AAA" Clippers
Senior Male Athlete of the Year	Grant Doyle
Junior Male Athlete of the Year	N/A
Female Athlete of the Year	Jessica Pendergast
Volunteer Administrator of the Year	Patti Arsenault
Official of the Year	Frank Deziel
Baseball Canada/MLB Volunteer of the Year	Roger Richard

=== 2007 Baseball PEI Award winners ===
Award	Winner
Baseball Canada/MLB Volunteer of the Year	George Morrison
