= Baseball Canada =

Canadian governing body for baseball

- Sport: Baseball
- Founded: 1964; 62 years ago
- Affiliation: WBSC
- Regional affiliation: WBSC Americas
- Headquarters: 2212 Gladwin Crescent; Ottawa, Ontario
- President: Jean Boulais

Official website
- baseball.ca

Baseball Canada is the national governing body for baseball in Canada. They are members of the Canadian Olympic Committee and the World Baseball Softball Confederation.

Incorporated in 1964 as the Canadian Federation of Amateur Baseball, it is made up of 10 provincial associations which represent players, coaches, and umpires across Canada.

They are funded and recognized by Sport Canada and Heritage Canada, and is recognized by Revenue Canada as having charitable status.

== National Baseball Teams ==
=== Men's national team ===
Canada competes in all WBSC sanctioned events. They were part of the inaugural World Baseball Classic tournament in 2006, where they recorded their best ever result of ninth place. They have sent teams to two Olympic Games, finishing in fourth place at the 2004 Summer Olympics. Canada has also been part of two WBSC Premier12 tournaments, losing in the quarterfinals in 2015.

=== Women's national team ===
Canada competes in the Women's Baseball World Cup, a WBSC sanctioned events. The inaugural Women's Baseball World Cup was held in Edmonton. Their best results are a pair of runner-up finishes in 2008 and 2016.

== National Baseball Team Programs ==
Baseball Canada's sole mission is "dedicated, through collaborative leadership, to develop, promote and deliver ethical athlete centred programs which allow individuals to maximize their potential."

Founded in 1999; the Junior National Team began an elite selection process in developing baseball players in North America. Canada Baseball organizes numerous teams composed of high school, college, and professional baseball players competing nationally and internationally.

Canada Baseball also fields the Junior National Team featuring the best under-18 prospects. The Mizuno Elite Development Camp which selects the top under-16 prospects in Canada every September to play at the Rogers Centre, home of the Toronto Blue Jays; evaluated by top coaches in the country. Another event that takes place annually is the Baseball Canada Cup. This event takes place every August within Canada. The competition features the under-17 players from each of the 10 provinces in Canada contending for a national championship. The final stage of the Junior National Team eventually leads to the World Junior Baseball Championship which takes place every other year. In the past this tour has included games against top collegiate summer teams, elite travel or club teams, and national teams from other countries both at the high school and college level. Since 1981, Canada has tallied one gold, one silver, and seven bronze medals with their most recent silver medal coming at the 2012 18U Baseball World Championship, held in Seoul, South Korea.

The Junior National Team has produced numerous players that have gone on to play professional and college baseball, along with players who have represented Canada in the World Baseball Classic, and also the Olympics. Some of these players include 2006 American League MVP Justin Morneau, 2004 National League Rookie of the Year Jason Bay, National League MVP Larry Walker and Joey Votto, first round picks Adam Loewen and Jeff Francis as well as current Major League Baseball players: Brett Lawrie, Russell Martin, Ryan Dempster, and John Axford.

== RBI Program (Reaching Baseball Ideals) ==
The program was created in 2008 in order to give local baseball associations across Canada the chance to apply for accreditation with the RBI Program. According to Baseball Canada, by becoming accredited through the RBI Program, an association gain credibility in their community. Parents signing their children up for baseball will be able to tell if the association they are signing up with is well-run and meets the high standards Baseball Canada sets for its programs. In order to apply for membership in the RBI Program, an association must at least meet the minimum standards in these five areas:

- Development Program → such as Baseball Canada's primary youth program Rally Cap
- Membership with Baseball Canada
- Coaches Training → ensures that all coaches are properly certified and that all potential volunteers are reviewed by the Police
- Accessibility → the association is accommodating to both boys and girls, and has programs in place for special needs children
- Pitching Safety → the number of pitches a child can throw in a game is limited to avoid potential arm damage

If an organization does not deal with young children (ages 5–8) and would still like to be a member of the program, they can gain membership through a points system that evaluates their association. They must meet at least 5 of the core criteria that Baseball Canada has set, a few of which are, having the Challenger Program for special needs children in place, a girls specific program, and hosting both umpire and coaches clinics. Based on how relevant each of these criteria are, the RBI Program awards the association points. If they meet the 5 necessary criteria but are awarded less than 10 points, they receive a bronze designation, if they are awarded 10-16 points they receive a silver designation, and if they are awarded 16-22 points they receive a gold designation.

The following associations have all received accreditation through the RBI Program:

Alberta

- Grand Prairie Minor Baseball Association-Mike Beck, President www.gpmba.ca
- Northeast Zone Baseball- Dave Ball, Baseball Director www.nezsportscouncil.com
- Sherwood Park Minor Baseball-John Lovie Jr., President www.spmba.ca

Saskatchewan

- Baseball Regina- Karen Toffan, President www.baseballregina.com
- Battlefords Minor Baseball - Clinton Gieni
- Melville Minor Baseball Association- Aaron Elmy, President www.melvilleball.com
- Preeceville Minor Baseball Association- Andrea Tonn
- Saskatoon Minor Baseball Association- Geoff Hughes, President www.baseballsaskatoon.com
- Weyburn Minor Baseball Association- Bert Kauf Weyburn Minor Ball baseball HOME
- Yorkton Minor Baseball Association- Kevin Shirtliffe, President BALLCHARTS - Free Team and League Websites | Baseball Lineup Cards

Manitoba

- Red River Valley Sports League - Iris McMillan, President www.rrvsl.com
- Winnipeg South Minor Baseball Association -Mike Anderson, President Winnipeg South Minor Baseball Association - (Winnipeg, MB) - powered by LeagueLineup.com
- North Winnipeg Minor Baseball Association- Bryan Ward, www.nwmba.ca
- St. James Assiniboia Minor Baseball - Kristal Benton, President St James Assiniboia Minor Baseball Association - (Winnipeg, MB) - powered by LeagueLineup.com
- Carillon Minor Baseball League - Louis Cote, President www.carillonbaseball.ca

New Brunswick

- Bathurst Minor Baseball Association - Phil Pitre, President
- Dieppe/Memramcook Minor Baseball Association - Guillaume Savoie, President เว็บแทงฟุตบอล คาสิโนออนไลน์ Holiday เว็บเล่นรูเล็ต บาคาร่าผ่านไอโฟน -
- Fredericton Minor Baseball Association - Paul Hornibrook, President www.frederictonminorbaseball.ca
- Moncton and District Minor Baseball Association - Paul Melanson, President www.monctonminorbaseball.ca

Prince Edward Island

- Stratford Minor Baseball Association - Matt O'Shea- Stratford Minor Baseball Association
- West Prince Minor Baseball Association - Kendal Hacket - West Prince Minor Baseball Association

== Challenger Program ==
Baseball Canada's Challenger Program is designed to ensure that children with special needs get the opportunity to participate in organized baseball. Whether they have mental or physical disabilities, children are given the opportunity to play at a level that is suited to their abilities. It is a safe, fun and positive environment where no score is kept, and each child is assigned their own personal "buddy" who aids them during a game. Whether it be learning the rules, aiding them around the base path, or teaching them how to play, these buddies help to ensure that each child has an enjoyable experience. Maintaining the team aspect of conventional baseball is a key part of this program, as is ensuring that each participant is treated the same way as they would be in a regular baseball program.

Baseball Canada's website provides this list of objectives they hope to meet through their Challenger Program:

- To provide an opportunity for children and youth with cognitive or physical disabilities to enjoy the benefits of playing baseball
- To educate the community that children with cognitive or physical disabilities can play organized baseball, just like their peers
- To help the youth in the community "give back" to society, by getting involved in the Challenger program as "Buddies"

Their website also provides this list of benefits they feel families and children will receive from participating in this program:

- enjoy the thrill of playing baseball
- be part of a team
- develop physical and social skills
- build self-esteem
- get exercise while having fun
- make new friends
- meet other children and families in their communities

== Winterball ==
Originally a program that was launched by Baseball Ontario, and with the help of Baseball Canada, Major League Baseball and the Toronto Blue Jays, it has become a nationwide program that helps get kids (primarily aged 6–12) involved with baseball in a fun and easy way. The program is set up with schools and local communities and is free of charge. It contains simple and entertaining games that a child can play by themselves or in groups. These games are designed specifically for each age group and focus on developing the key skill sets used in baseball: hitting, throwing, and fielding. The non-competitive aspect of these games ensures that each child has fun and doesn't feel that baseball isn't for them if they don't succeed. In addition to the physical benefits of the program, Winterball also teaches children valuable social skills, such as how to play fair, how to play as a team, and proper etiquette.

Some of the games included in the program are:

- Wallball → Several variations to accommodate one or multiple players and work on different skills. For example, player stands certain distance from wall and picks a "square" on the wall which will the designated strike zone and attempts to pitch ball in the square. The farther back they throw from, the more points they receive. This game helps to develop child's pitching skills.
- Pop-Up → Child throw's a ball straight into the air and attempts to catch the ball as it is coming down. Can be played with multiple players, as one child would throw the ball and the rest would attempt to catch the "pop fly". This game helps to develop child's catching/fielding skills.
- Home Run → Children alternate between being pitcher and batter. Using a wiffle ball or softball, pitcher throws to batter and he/she attempts to hit the ball as far as possible in the air. The farther the ball travels in the air, the more points the batter receives. This game helps to develop child's batting and pitching skills.

== Provincial Associations ==
- Baseball B.C.
- Baseball Alberta
- Saskatchewan Baseball
- Baseball Manitoba
- Baseball Ontario
- Baseball Québec
- Baseball New Brunswick
- Baseball Nova Scotia
- Baseball PEI
- Baseball NL

== See also ==
- Canada national baseball team
- List of Major League Baseball players from Canada
- Canada women's national baseball team
