= Saskatchewan Baseball =

Provincial governing body for baseball in Saskatchewan, Western Canada

Baseball Sask
- Sport: Baseball
- Jurisdiction: Saskatchewan
- Founded: 1959
- Headquarters: Regina
- Location: Regina, Saskatoon
- President: Terry Butler
- Sponsor: Sport Canada, Baseball Canada

Official website
- saskbaseball.ca
- Other key staff: Mike Ramage
- (Canada)
- (Saskatchewan)

Baseball Sask is the provincial governing body for baseball in Saskatchewan.
