= Jeff Mallett =

Canadian businessman

- Born: August 7, 1964 (age 62); North Vancouver, British Columbia, Canada
- Education: University of Victoria; San Francisco State University
- Employer(s): Yahoo! (1995–2002); SNOCAP (2005–2008)
- Known for: Director of Yahoo!
- Board member of: Synacor
- Children: 2

Jeffrey Mallett (born August 7, 1964) is a Canadian entrepreneur and investor. He is best known for building the internet giant Yahoo!. Described as Yahoo's "wizard behind the curtains pulling all the levers," Mallett manages a portfolio of Internet, sports, entertainment and real estate investments in the United States, Canada, England, and China.

== Early years ==
While living in Victoria, Mallett attended Arbutus Junior High School (Sept 1977 – June 1980) and Mount Douglas Secondary School (Sept 1980 – June 1982), graduating with the "Class of Gold". He was a standout athlete playing soccer with Gordon Head Soccer Association and baseball with Gordon Head Baseball Association. As a teenager, he played soccer at the University of Victoria. He went on to play for one year at San Francisco State University. Mallett attended and played varsity soccer at the University of Victoria, Santa Rosa Jr. College, and San Francisco State University.

== Career ==
At the age of 22, he was running sales, marketing and business development at his parents' telecommunications company, Island Pacific Telephone until it was acquired by telecommunications giant Cable and Wireless in 1987. He was an early employee of Reference Software, a company started by then San Francisco State University professor Don Emery. The company developed grammar-checking software and was bought by Word Perfect in 1992, where Mallett became head of the global consumer division.

Before the age of 30, Mallett was vice president and general manager of the consumer products division of Novell, Inc. and a member of Novell's global marketing board, where he was involved with the merger of Novell and WordPerfect Corporation in 1994.

Mallett spent five years on Premier Gordon Campbell's British Columbia Progress Board. He was on the Premier's Progress Board from 2004–2007. The Board is an independent panel of up to 18 senior business executives and academic leaders, selected for their ability to contribute expertise on the province's economic progress and environmental and social condition.

=== Yahoo! ===
Mallett is recognized as an icon of the Internet technology boom that lit up stock markets from the mid-to-late 1990s. In 1995, Yahoo! founder Jerry Yang offered North Vancouver-born Mallett the job of president and COO at Yang's 11-employee startup. Mallett helped the company go public in 1996, and during his seven-year tenure, helped build Yahoo into an entertainment and media brands.

By 2002, Mallett managed a workforce of 4,000 employees in 27 countries, with $1 billion in revenue, and had overseen more than 20 acquisitions for the company. As president and chief operating officer for Yahoo Inc. from 1995–2002, Mallett helped drive growth and success for the company while simultaneously serving as an elected member of the Board of Directors.

=== San Francisco Giants ===
Mallett is a principal owner and executive committee member of Major League Baseball's San Francisco Giants, a role which includes ownership and management of the AT&T Park and 30% ownership of the San Francisco Bay Area's regional sports cable television network Comcast SportsNet Bay Area. In April 2009, the San Francisco Giants purchased a 25 percent ownership stake in the San Jose Giants, with the option of buying another 30 percent of the team, or a controlling interest, by the end of 2010. The San Jose Giants are a member of the Class A Advanced California League and part of the San Francisco team's minor-league farm system since 1988. Mallett joined the San Francisco Giants organization in 2002.

=== Derby County Football Club ===
On March 20, 2009 he became a principal investor of Derby County Football Club, which plays in the English League Championship. Mallett travels to England frequently as a member of the Derby County Football Club Board of Directors.

=== Vancouver Whitecaps FC ===
Mallett is an investor and co-director of the Vancouver Whitecaps. The Vancouver Whitecaps ownership group consists of Mallett, Greg Kerfoot, Steve Luczo and Steve Nash. On October 15, 2008, the Whitecaps submitted a bid to secure one of two MLS expansion teams for the 2011 season, having announced their bidding plans at a press conference in Vancouver on July 25, 2008. On March 18, 2009, Major League Soccer (MLS) commissioner Don Garber announced that Vancouver would be the home of the 17th team in MLS. The MLS team began play in 2011 at the temporary Empire Field, and then moved during that season to the newly renovated BC Place Stadium in the city's downtown entertainment district. The venue underwent approximately $458 million in improvements before the new team took to the field, and has a 20,000-seat soccer-specific configuration.[] The 2009 Vancouver Whitecaps season went down as one of the most eventful campaigns in club history. [Outdated]

=== Women's professional soccer ===
In early 2008, along with close friend NBA MVP Steve Nash, Mallett became investor and part owner of the Women's Professional Soccer (WPS) league. While Nash and Mallett will not operate a team, their investment will fund the ongoing development of WPS. Women's Professional Soccer (WPS) is the premier women's soccer league in the world. The inaugural season kicked off in March 2009 with seven WPS teams based in the Bay Area, Boston, Chicago, Los Angeles, New Jersey/New York, St. Louis, and Washington, D.C. The league's eighth and nine franchises, Philadelphia and Atlanta, began play in the 2010 WPS Season, which began March 2010.

=== Indochino ===
Mallett is former chairman and an investor of Indochino, which claims to be the world's largest online retailer of custom suits, with a head office in Vancouver, British Columbia and second office in Shanghai, China. It was founded by CEO Kyle Vucko, 22, and 26-year-old Heikal Gani – both students at the University of Victoria when they started the company. They started the company because of their own struggle to find a reasonably priced made-to-measure suit, launching the website in 2007. BusinessWeek featured Indochino in their series, America's Most Promising Startups, with the article "This Business Suits the Internet". Indochino has customers in 60 countries and sales nearly quintupled in 2009, with 35% of orders coming from repeat customers. The company has plans to open an additional 20 locations in 2019.

=== Synacor ===
Since September 2007, Mallett has been a member of the board of directors of Buffalo, New York-based technology firm Synacor, a provider of private-label digital Internet services to North American cable and telecom companies.

=== Steve Nash Enterprises ===
Mallett is an advisor to Steve Nash Enterprises, a portfolio of a dozen ventures that includes Nash's foundation, The Steve Nash Foundation. Formed in 2001, given U.S. charitable status in 2004, and Canadian charitable status in 2007, the Steve Nash Foundation is a private foundation dedicated to assisting underserved children in their health, personal development, education and enjoyment of life. Nash has started a film-production company, become a part-owner of the Vancouver Whitecaps, which joined Major League Soccer in 2011, and taken equity in several startups, including Mission Skincare, which develops products for athletes. Part of the revenue will go to his foundation.

=== Vineyard Knolls Golf Club of Napa ===
Mallett is the owner of Napa Valley's Vineyard Knolls Golf Club of Napa. Purchased in 1999 by the Mallett family, Vineyard Knolls Golf Club of Napa was Napa's first municipal golf course and was called Little Knolls. It was later purchased by Hollywood movie producer, David Wolper who transformed the property into a private estate. Vineyard Knolls is a golf course on 30 acres (120,000 m^{2}) in the Carneros wine region the Napa Valley. Vineyard Knolls is a USGA member course and is NCGA sanctioned with a rating/slope of 57.6/94. The course is a teaching course for the David Pelz 3-Day Scoring Game School.

=== Corotto Vineyards ===
Mallett is the owner of Napa Valley's Corotto Vineyards in Napa's Carneros district. Located next to Vineyard Knolls Golf Club of Napa, Corotto Vineyards is a premium Carneros vineyard that has been growing pinot noir and chardonnay grapes for some of Napa and Sonoma Valley's winemakers and wineries for over 30 years.

=== Snocap ===
From 2005–2008 Mallett served as Chairman of SNOCAP, a digital music service by Napster founder, Shawn Fanning. In 2008 SNOCAP was sold to imeem which is the third largest social network in the U.S. with over 24 million unique visitors a month.

=== University of Victoria ===
Mallett stays close to his Canadian roots by remaining active with the University of Victoria, including being appointed to the Faculty of Business Board of Advisors and recognized with the first "Distinguished Entrepreneur of the Year Award" from UVic's Gustavson School of Business, as well as being appointed an honorary professor. The annual award acknowledges an inspirational entrepreneur who has had a positive impact on the global community through their business leadership. Supporting the next generation of leaders, Mallett established "The Jeffrey Mallett Leadership Award" which is an annual scholarship awarded to an outstanding University of Victoria student.

== Personal life ==
Though Mallett has a history and experience in growing technology companies, his real love is sports. Mallett has been involved in sports – especially soccer – all his life.

Mallett is involved in charity and humanitarian projects and lives in the San Francisco Bay Area with his wife and two daughters.
