= Baseball Nova Scotia =

Canadian governing body for baseball

- Sport: Baseball
- Jurisdiction: Nova Scotia
- Headquarters: Halifax
- Location: Halifax
- President: Andrew Downs
- Sponsor: Sport Canada, Sport Nova Scotia, Baseball Canada

Official website
- baseballnovascotia.com
- (Canada)
- (Nova Scotia)

Baseball Nova Scotia is the provincial governing body for baseball in Nova Scotia.
