= Baseball New Brunswick =

Canadian governing body for baseball

- Sport: Baseball
- Jurisdiction: New Brunswick
- Founded: 1989
- Headquarters: Fredericton
- Location: Fredericton
- President: David Watling
- CEO: David Dion
- Sponsor: Sport Canada, Baseball Canada

Official website
- baseballnb.ca
- (Canada)
- (New Brunswick)

Baseball New Brunswick is the provincial governing body for baseball in New Brunswick, Canada.
