= Baseball Manitoba =

Canadian governing body for baseball

- Sport: Baseball
- Jurisdiction: Manitoba
- Founded: 1968
- Affiliation: Baseball Canada
- Headquarters: Winnipeg
- President: Tony Siemens
- CEO: Jason Miller
- Other key staff: Brenda Horz, James Zamko
- Sponsor: Sport Manitoba

Official website
- baseballmanitoba.ca
- (Canada)
- (Manitoba)

Baseball Manitoba, or the Manitoba Baseball Association, is the governing body for amateur baseball in the province of Manitoba, Canada. It was founded in 1968 and is the provincial branch of Baseball Canada. Its role is to promote the sport, encourage player development, and oversee all organized competition in Manitoba. It currently has approximately 14,000 members.

== Leagues ==
- Senior
  - Border West Senior League
  - Brandon Senior Baseball League
  - Santa Clara Senior League
  - Southwest Senior League
  - Thompson Senior League
  - Winnipeg Senior Baseball League
- Junior
  - Manitoba Junior Baseball League
- Minor
  - Bonivital Minor
  - Brandon Minor
  - Carillon Minor
  - Interlake Minor
  - Red Lake Minor
  - Midwest Minor
  - North Winnipeg Minor
  - Oil Dome Minor
  - Parkland Minor
  - Pembina Hills Minor
  - Portage Minor
  - Red River Valley Sports League
  - South Central Minor
  - St. James Minor
  - Winnipeg South Minor
  - Winnipeg AAA Baseball

== Management Committee ==
  - President - Tony Siemens (Rosenort)
  - Past President - Ken Sharpe (Minnedosa)
  - Vice-President Finance - David Whitehead (Winnipeg)
  - Vice-President Policy - Winston Smith (Winnipeg)
  - Vice-President Coaching - Louis Cote (La Broquerie )
  - Vice-President Competition - Alex Grenier (Ile Des Chenes)
  - Vice-President High Performance - Kevin Booker (Winnipeg)
  - Vice-President Sport Development - Nicole Madsen (Hamiota)
  - Vice-President Official Development- Ashton Liskie (Winnipeg)
