= Baseball NL =

Canadian governing body for baseball

- Sport: Baseball
- Jurisdiction: Newfoundland and Labrador
- President: Kevin Legge
- Sponsor: Sport Canada, Baseball Canada

Official website
- sport.ca/nlbaseball/
- (Canada)
- (Newfoundland and Labrador)

Baseball NL is the provincial governing body for baseball in Newfoundland and Labrador, Canada.
