= Carson Vitale =

Canadian baseball coach (born 1988)

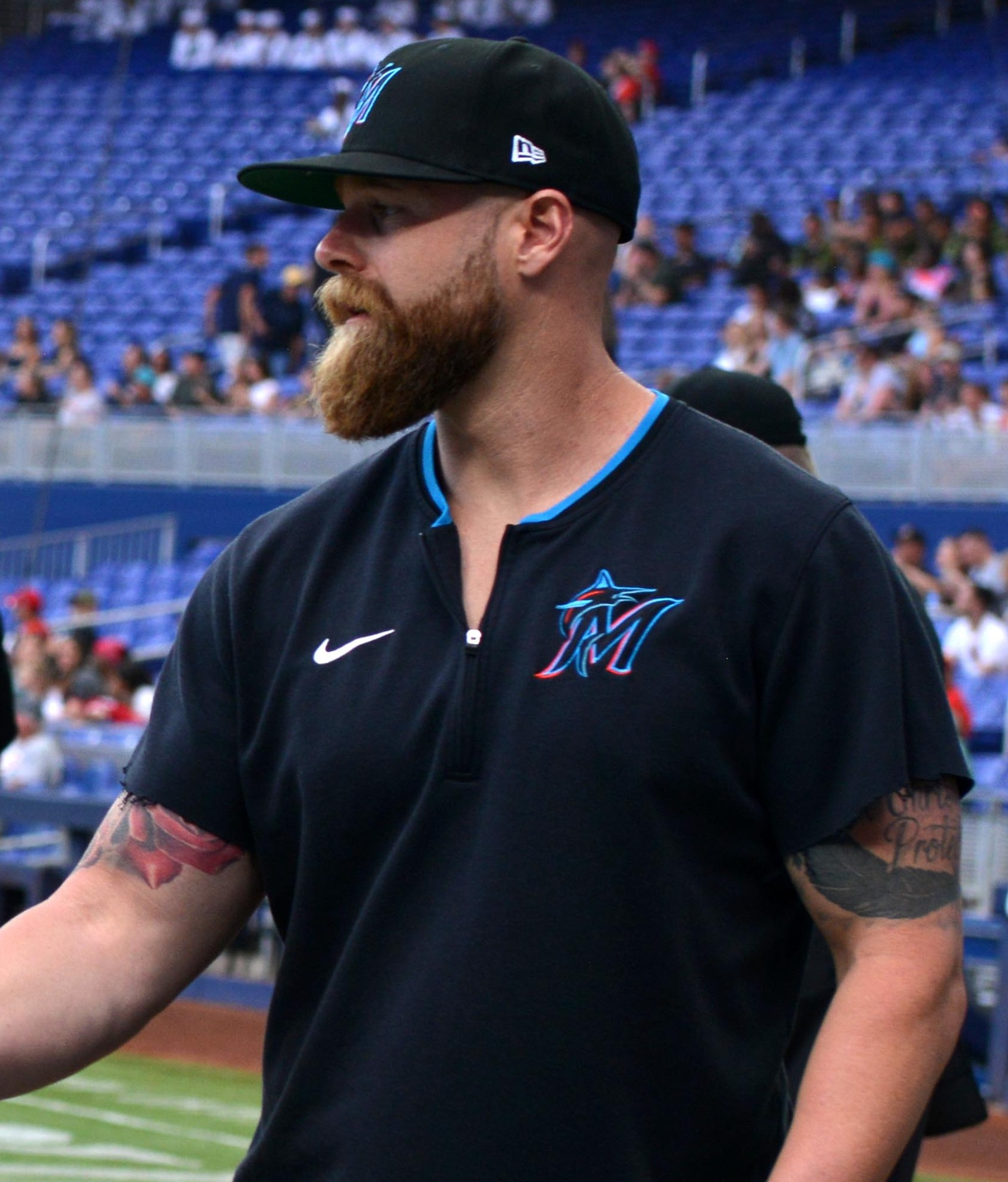
- Vitale with the Miami Marlins in 2025

Miami Marlins – No. 25
- Coach
- Born: August 25, 1988 (age 38); Victoria, British Columbia, Canada
- Bats: Right Throws: Right

Teams
- As coach: Seattle Mariners (2020–2024); Miami Marlins (2025–present)

Carson R. Vitale (born August 25, 1988) is a Canadian professional baseball bench coach for the Miami Marlins of Major League Baseball (MLB). He has previously served as a field coordinator for the Seattle Mariners.

== Playing career ==
Vitale attended Lambrick Park Secondary School in Victoria, British Columbia. Viatale attended Laredo College for his freshman year of college, and transferred to McLennan Community College for his sophomore year. Vitale transferred to Creighton University for his final two years of college.

Vitale was drafted by the Texas Rangers in the 38th round of the 2010 MLB draft. He played for the rookie–level Arizona League Rangers and Low–A Spokane Indians in 2010, and for Spokane again in 2011.

== Coaching career ==
=== Los Angeles Angels ===
Vitale joined the Los Angeles Angels organization as a coach in 2012. He served as the hitting coach for the rookie–level Arizona League Angels in 2012, and as hitting coach for the rookie–level Orem Owls in 2013. He spent the 2014 and 2015 seasons as the manager of the Dominican Summer League Angels.

=== Los Angeles Dodgers ===
He joined the Los Angeles Dodgers organization and served as their International Field Coordinator in 2016 and 2017. He then joined the Seattle Mariners organization and served as their minor league field coordinator in 2018 and 2019.

=== Seattle Mariners ===
On November 7, 2019, Vitale was named the Major League field coordinator for the Seattle Mariners.

=== Miami Marlins ===
On November 26, 2024, Vitale was hired by the Miami Marlins as a bench coach.
