= Northern Elite League =

The Northern Elite League (NEL) was created in 1992, as a way of giving Northern Ontario baseball players a competitive league of their own. This task was spearheaded by North Bay's Peter Topolie, past president of Baseball Ontario.

The NEL originally had 6 teams competing for the Blue Jay Cup. They were:

- North Bay Jays
- Sault Ste. Marie Cambrian Nissan
- Sudbury Lakers
- Timmins Whiskey Jacks
- Garson Tigers
- North Shore Knights

This league features teams playing in a Showcase Tournament, a 15-game regular season, and playoffs at the home of the 1st place team.

The 2006 season has four teams:

- Sault Ste. Marie Black Sox
- Sudbury Reds
- Timmins Whiskey Jacks
- Valley East Vipers

== Professional Alumni ==
The NEL has produced professional players. Aaron Fera, from Sault Ste. Marie, Ont., was a 32nd round draft pick of the Toronto Blue Jays in 1999 out of a college in Georgia. He made it to High A with the St. Louis Cardinals Organization and finished off by playing a few seasons of Independent baseball. He was a power hitting outfielder for the Soo Black Sox during his time in the NEL.

Dodge-City Kansas community college starter James Pidutti, signed by the Blue Jays in 2002. Defeated Pratt and Hutchinson, 7th team in the nation. Complete game 2 hitter. Pitched late into game vs defending World Series champion North Central Texas and Cowley. Left game in 6th inning with the lead vs Seminole, Oklahoma. Was used as a DH occasionally.

The left-handed reliever pitched in 44 1/3 innings over 2 seasons at the Rookie Ball level. James was known for his sinking fastball that topped out at 90 mph with movement. He was also a bruising power hitter for the Sudbury Lakers during his NEL days.

He had a career 5.68 ERA in 30 affiliated professional games. Pidutti was signed to a 2005 contract to Calgary of the Northern Independent League before finishing up in Rimini, debuting vs San Marino of the Italian Series A, Division 1 League.

2006 saw Soo Native, Tyler Binkley get drafted in the 40th round out of high-school to the New York Mets but elected to play at powerhouse Seward Community College in Kansas where he posted a 4.73 ERA. in 78 innings before playing briefly at a South Dakota university.

2007. Soo native Kai Tuomi, drafted in the 40th round to the Washington Nationals after a long and successful 4 seasons at the University of Evansville. 24-10 and career 3.79 ERA. The LHP did not fare well in his brief stint in the minors but held his own rounding off is his career in independent ball.

2013. Garson native, 6'9 RHP Dylan Rheault was drafted in the 19th round to the Orioles out of Central Michigan. He had a bright start in his minor league career and cruised to High A but in 2015 posted a 6.39 ERA. walking 40 batters while fanning only 26, in 69 innings. Rheault never played in the NEL like the above 4 players mentioned but he grew up playing in the Sudbury area. Rheault signed on with Winnipeg, an independent minor league baseball team for 2016. Rheault was picked up by the San Francisco Giants and is hoping to get back into affiliated baseball in 2017. Where he led the California league High A with 21 saves, with an ERA OF 2.70, Was a POST SEASON ALL-STAR and a MILB ORGANIZATION ALL STAR with the Giants, Has now signed with the St. Louis, Cardinals and will be pitching with the AA SPRINGFIELD CARDINALS for the 2019 season !!!

== Past Champions ==
Year	Champions	Finalists	League/Playoff MVP
1992	North Bay Jays	Sudbury Lakers	Damon Topolie, North Bay
1993	North Bay Jays	Soo Nissan	Pat Primeau, North Bay
1994	North Bay Jays (9-7-0)	Soo Nissan (11-5-0)	Brian Ducharme, Soo
1995	Sudbury Lakers (12-5-1)	Soo Nissan (17-2-0)	Trevor Cain, Sudbury
1996	Soo Nissan (17-2-0)	North Bay Jays (12-8-0)	Aaron Fera, Soo
1997	Soo Nissan (13-5-1)	North Bay Jays (16-3-0)	Greg Abour, Soo
1998	Soo Black Sox (16-4-0)	Sudbury Lakers (15-5-0)	Jon Agliani, Soo
1999	Sudbury Lakers (8-3-1)	Soo Black Sox (7-5-0)	James Pidutti, Sudbury
2000	Soo Black Sox (11-4-0)	Sudbury Lakers (9-5-1)	Rob Conley, Soo
2001	Soo Black Sox (15-0-0)	Timmins Whiskey Jacks (4-10-0)	Jeff Leonard, Soo
2002	Soo Black Sox (15-3-0-1)	Sudbury Lakers (17-2-0-1)	Jason Rooley, Soo
2003	Timmins Whiskey Jacks (10-9-0-0)	Callander Selects (10-9-0-1)	Chris Greer, Timmins
2004	Sudbury Lakers (11-4-0-0)	Timmins Whiskey Jacks (10-5-0-0)	Gary Bayrack, Subdury
2005	Sudbury Reds (7-1-0-0)	Timmins Whiskey Jacks (4-4-0-0)	Robb Fenton, Sudbury
2006	Sudbury Reds (13-2-0-0)	Timmins Whiskey Jacks (4-11-1-0)	James Pidutti, Sudbury and Chris Greer, Timmins

== Northern Elite League Career Records ==
Team	Record (W-L-T-ExL)	Championships Won
Soo Black Sox Formerly Soo Nissan	121-43-1-2	6
Sudbury Reds Formerly Sudbury Lakers	115-54-5-2	5
North Bay Jays Defunct	43-27-1	3
Timmins Whiskey Jacks	54-103-3-1	1
Valley East Vipers	40-119-6-1	0
Garson/North Shore Defunct	20-36-2	0
Callander Selects Defunct	16-21-0-1	0

Note: Records compiled 1996–2006
