= Baseball Québec =

Canadian governing body for baseball

- Sport: Baseball
- Jurisdiction: Quebec
- Headquarters: Montreal
- Location: Montreal
- President: Marc Vadboncoeur
- CEO: Maxime Lamarche
- Sponsor: Sport Canada, Baseball Canada

Official website
- www.baseballquebec.com/fr/index.html
- (Canada)
- (Quebec)

Baseball Québec is the provincial governing body for baseball in the Canadian province of Quebec.

== Levels ==
- Ligue de Baseball Senior Élite du Québec (Senior Men's - over 21)
- Ligue de Baseball Élite du Québec (Junior Elite - under 21)
- Junior (AA, BB) - Under 21
- Midget (AAA, AA, A, B): 16–18 years old
- Bantam (AA, A, B): 14–15 years old
- Pee-Wee (AA, A, B): 12–13 years old
- Mosquito (AA, A, B): 10–11 years old
- Atom (A, B): 8–9 years old
