= Michael Saunders =

Canadian baseball player (born 1986)

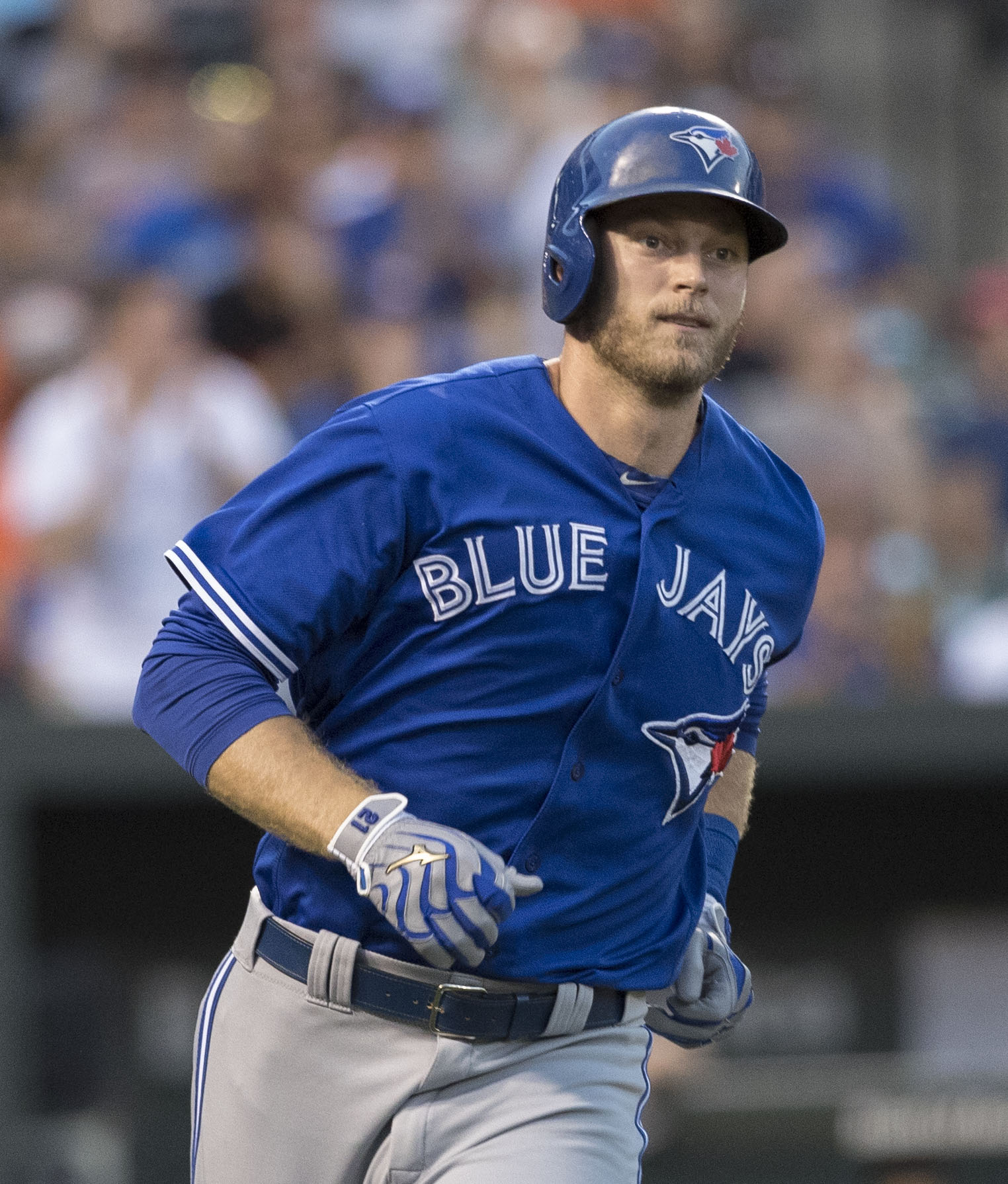
- Saunders with the Toronto Blue Jays in 2016
- Outfielder
- Born: November 19, 1986 (age 39); Victoria, British Columbia, Canada
- Batted: Left Threw: Right

MLB debut
- July 25, 2009, for the Seattle Mariners

Last MLB appearance
- October 1, 2017, for the Toronto Blue Jays

MLB statistics
- Batting average: .232
- Home runs: 81
- Runs batted in: 263
- Stats at Baseball Reference

Teams
- Seattle Mariners (2009–2014); Toronto Blue Jays (2015–2016); Philadelphia Phillies (2017); Toronto Blue Jays (2017)

Career highlights and awards
- All-Star (2016)

Michael Edward Brett Saunders (born November 19, 1986) is a Canadian former professional baseball outfielder. He played in Major League Baseball (MLB) for the Seattle Mariners, Toronto Blue Jays, and Philadelphia Phillies.

He was nicknamed "the Condor" by Mariners coach Lee Tinsley as well as "Captain Canada".

== Amateur career ==
Saunders started his baseball playing Little League Baseball in the Gordon Head Baseball Association and was part of the Canadian team at the 1999 Little League World Series. While attending Lambrick Park Secondary School in Victoria, British Columbia, Saunders played high school baseball for the Victoria Mariners of the British Columbia Premier Baseball League. He then played for the Tallahassee Community College Eagles prior to being drafted.

== Professional career ==
=== Seattle Mariners ===
The Seattle Mariners selected Saunders in the 11th round of the 2004 MLB draft. He then spent the 2005 season with the Everett AquaSox of the Short Season-A Northwest League, hitting .270 with seven home runs and 39 runs batted in (RBI). In 2006, he was promoted to the Wisconsin Timber Rattlers of the Class-A Midwest League, hitting .239 with four home runs and 39 RBI. Despite struggling in 2006, for 2007 he was promoted to the High Desert Mavericks of the Advanced-A California League, where he excelled, hitting .299 with 14 home runs and 77 RBI, before he was called up to the West Tenn Diamond Jaxx of the Double-A Southern League, where he finished off the season hitting .288 with one home run and seven RBI in 15 games. Saunders started the 2008 season once again in West Tenn, where he hit .290 with eight home runs and 30 RBI in 67 games before being promoted to the Tacoma Rainiers of the Triple-A Pacific Coast League on June 17.

After beginning the 2009 season with the Rainiers where he hit .313 with 13 home runs and 32 RBI in 243 at-bats, Saunders was promoted from Tacoma on July 25, when the Mariners designated Wladimir Balentien for assignment. Saunders made his MLB debut that day in a game against the Cleveland Indians at Safeco Field, where he went hitless in a 10–3 loss. His first MLB hit was a single off of Cliff Lee on July 26.

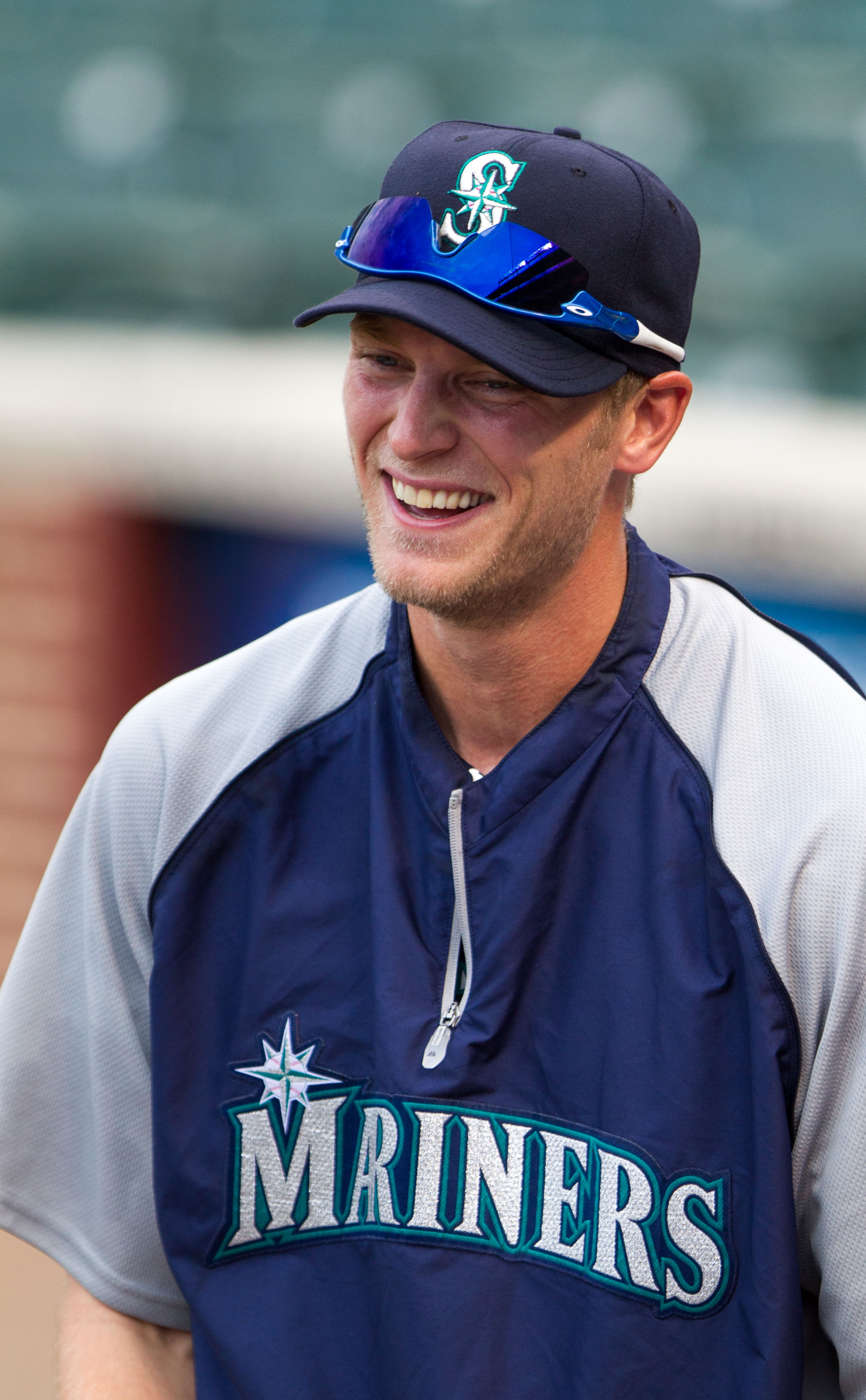
Saunders with the Mariners in 2012

On May 6, 2010, Saunders was recalled from Tacoma after the Mariners put Milton Bradley on the restricted list. Three days later, Saunders hit his first MLB home run off Angels pitcher Ervin Santana. He finished his rookie season with a .211 batting average, 10 home runs, and 33 RBI. Saunders played only 58 games for the Mariners in 2011 and batted .149 with just two home runs and eight RBI.

In 2012, Saunders played a career-high 139 games and greatly improved upon his 2011 . He hit .247 with 19 home runs and 57 RBI. He played in 132 games the following season. Saunders finished 2013 with a .236 batting average, 12 home runs, and 46 RBI. In 2014, Saunders battled a number of injuries that limited him to 78 games, but finished with a career-high .273 average with 8 home runs and 34 RBI. At the end of the season, general manager Jack Zduriencikcriticized Saunders' work ethic, which Saunders challenged.

=== Toronto Blue Jays ===
On December 3, the Mariners traded Saunders to the Toronto Blue Jays in for pitcher J. A. Happ. Saunders agreed to a one-year, $2.875 million contract on January 16, 2015, avoiding salary arbitration.

On February 25, Saunders stepped on a sprinkler head while shagging fly balls and tore his meniscus. Initially, the expectation was for Saunders to be on the disabled list until the All-Star break. However, after having surgery to remove 60% of his meniscus, the estimate was reduced to 4–6 weeks. He was assigned to the Advanced-A Dunedin Blue Jays for a rehab assignment on April 8. After the Blue Jays lost 12–3 to the Tampa Bay Rays on April 24, Saunders was activated off the disabled list. He experienced discomfort in his knee in early May, missing several games after having fluid drained and receiving a cortisone injection. Saunders returned to the lineup on May 9 but was placed on the 15-day disabled list the following day to rest his knee. After remaining on the disabled list into August, Saunders was officially shut down for the rest of the 2015 season on August 18. He appeared in just nine games for the Blue Jays, batting .194 with three RBI.

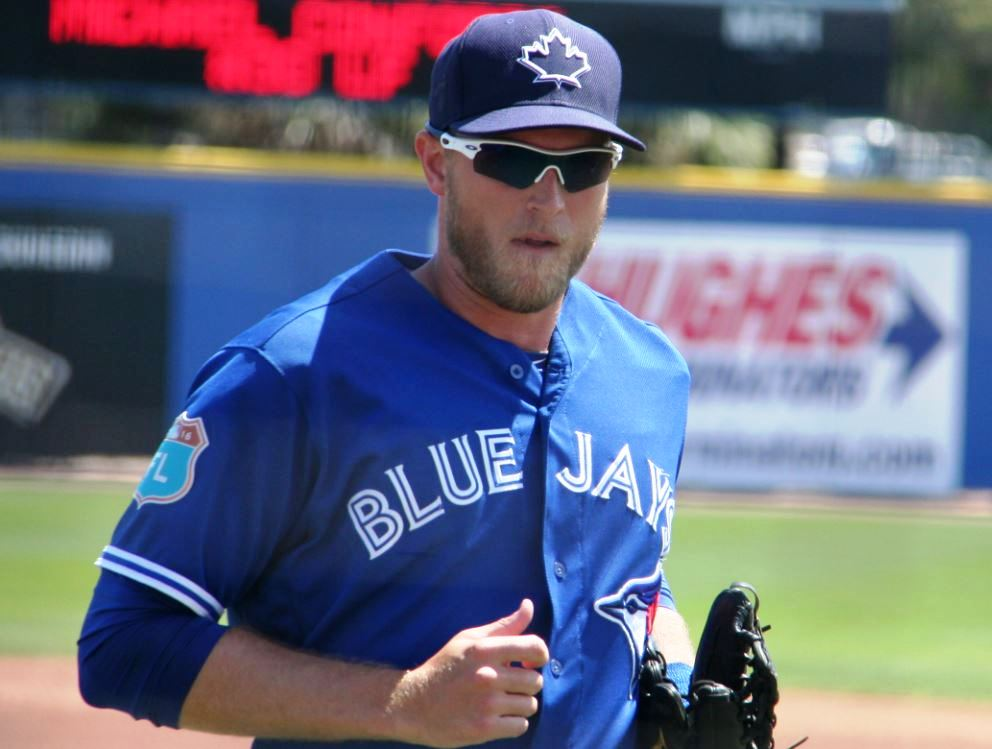
Saunders during 2016 spring training

On January 15, 2016, Saunders and the Blue Jays avoided salary arbitration by agreeing to a one-year, $2.9 million contract. In a 13–3 win over the Baltimore Orioles on June 17, Saunders hit three home runs for the first time in his career, joining Joey Votto, Justin Morneau, and Larry Walker as the only Canadian-born players ever to hit three home runs in an MLB game and became the first to do so for a Canadian team. He also had eight RBI in the game, which established another career-high. Saunders was named as one of five candidates for the All-Star Game Final Vote campaign on July 5. He was announced as the Final Vote winner on July 8. After the All-Star break, Saunders struggled to a .178 batting average, eight home runs, and 15 RBI. Despite the poor second half of his season, Saunders still established several career-highs in 2016. He ended the campaign with a .253 batting average, 24 home runs, and 57 RBI in 140 games played. He appeared in eight postseason games for the Blue Jays, his only postseason appearance, batting .381. He homered in Game 3 of the American League Championship Series.

=== Philadelphia Phillies ===
On January 16, 2017, Saunders agreed to a one-year, $8 million contract with the Philadelphia Phillies that also includes a $9 million club option for the 2018 season. The contract became official on January 19. He struggled to a .205 average with six home runs for the last-place Phillies during the first three months of the season. On June 20, Saunders was designated for assignment by the Phillies. He was released three days later.

=== Toronto Blue Jays (second stint) ===
On June 28, 2017, Saunders signed a minor league contract with the Toronto Blue Jays. On August 31, Blue Jays' manager John Gibbons announced that Saunders would be called up on September 1. He played in 12 games to end his MLB career, batting 3-for-18 with one RBI.

=== Return to the minors: Baltimore Orioles and Chicago White Sox ===
Saunders signed a minor league contract with the Pittsburgh Pirates on February 21, 2018. After Pittsburgh acquired Corey Dickerson the following day, Saunders requested his release from the team. On February 23, he signed a minor league contract with the Kansas City Royals. The Royals released Saunders on March 24, and he signed a minor league contract with the Baltimore Orioles on April 2. He made 25 appearances for the Triple-A Norfolk Tides, batting .161/.291/.253 with one home run, 14 RBI, and two stolen bases. On May 15, Saunders asked for and was granted his release by the Orioles.

On May 21, Saunders signed a minor league contract with the Chicago White Sox. In 13 games for the Triple-A Charlotte Knights, he slashed .152/.235/.239 with one home run and four RBI. Saunders was released by the White Sox organization on June 21.

On December 30, Saunders signed a minor league deal with the Colorado Rockies. He was released prior to the start of the season on March 17, 2019.

== International career ==
Saunders represented Canada at the 2008 Olympics in Beijing. Serving as Canada's primary right-fielder, Saunders had eight hits in 28 at-bats out of the third spot in the line-up. He scored five runs and had four RBI in seven games, while his two home runs led Canada to a 6th-place finish.

Saunders represented Canada at the 2013 World Baseball Classic (WBC) and was named as one of three outfielders on the All-WBC Team after batting .727 in the tournament.

On January 9, 2019, Saunders was named to Canada's roster for the 2019 Pan American Games Qualifier. On October 8, he was selected for the 2019 WBSC Premier12.

== Post-playing career ==
On October 25, 2019, Saunders announced that he would retire following the 2019 WBSC Premier12 and become a minor league coach in the Atlanta Braves organization in 2020. In March 2021, he was named as the manager of the Augusta GreenJackets, Atlanta's Single-A affiliate.

In January 2025, the Seattle Mariners announced Saunders would served as their minor league baserunning coordinator. Later in 2025, Lambrick Park Secondary School announced Saunders would join the school's baseball academy staff in 2026.
