= Lambrick Park Secondary School =

School in British Columbia, Canada

Location
- 4139 Torquay Drive Victoria BC V8N 3L1; Victoria, British Columbia; Canada; 48.47938°N 123.33078°W

Information
- Type: Public
- Motto: Lambrick Park PRIDE
- School district: School District 61 Greater Victoria
- Principal: Gautam Khosla
- Grades: 9-12
- Enrollment: 691 (2017-2018)
- Campus: Suburban
- Mascot: Blue the Lion
- Team name: Lions
- Website: www.lambrickpark.sd61.bc.ca

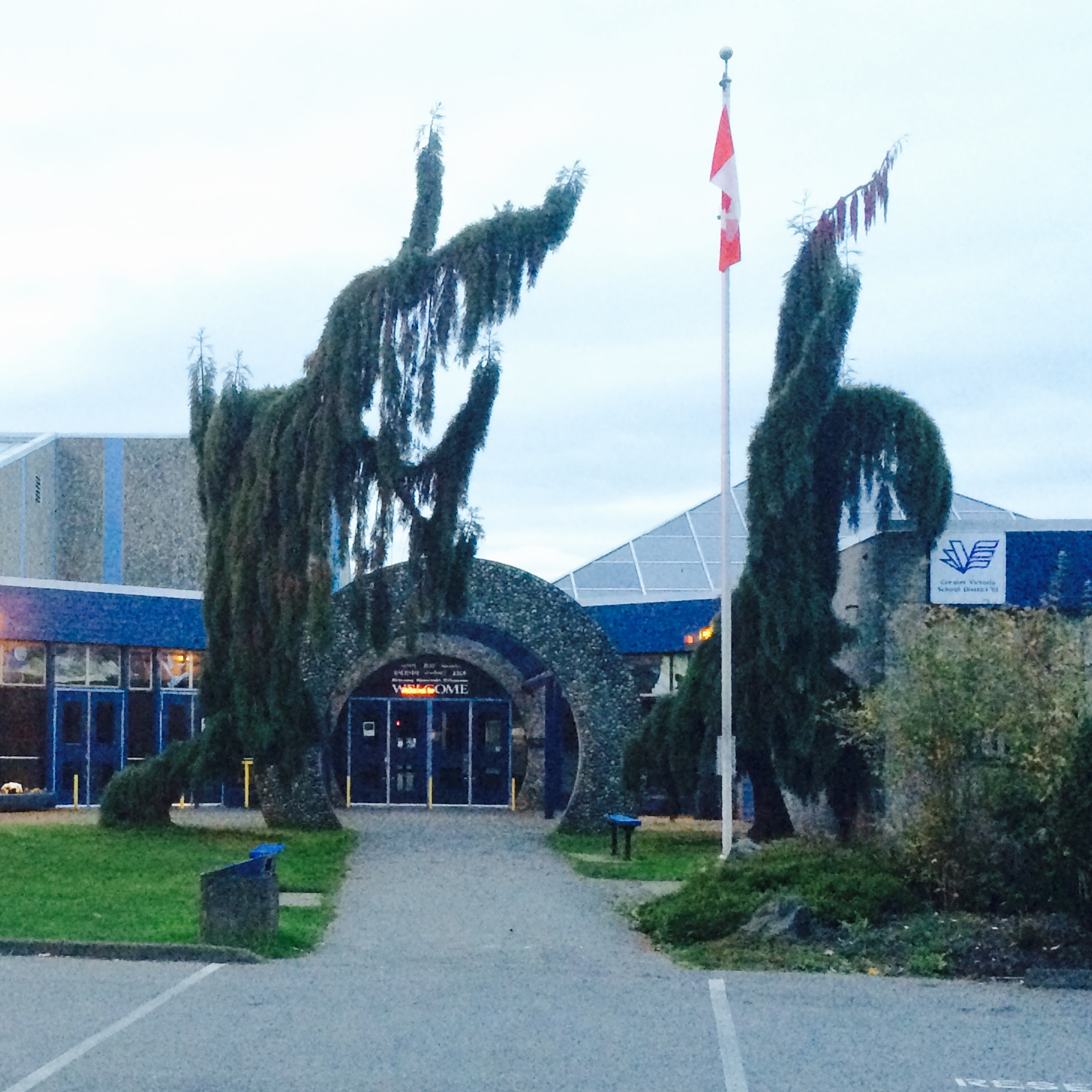
Lambrick Park SS, main entry 2015

Lambrick Park Secondary School is a four-year (grades 9-12) public secondary school located in Saanich, British Columbia, Canada.

The school, part of Greater Victoria's School District 61, opened for the 1976-77 academic year and had its first graduates in 1978.

Lambrick Park is part of the family of schools that include Torquay Elementary School and Gordon Head Middle School.

== Programs ==
In addition to courses in English, mathematics, history, science and social studies, the school has programs in business and technical education, physical education, fine arts, computing and home economics. Lambrick Park offers four years of French and three years of Spanish instruction. School is in session from 8:55 a.m. to 3:15 p.m.; each class period is 80 minutes long, with four such periods daily Mondays through Thursdays. On Fridays, classes finish early at 1:30 p.m.; each class is shortened to 50 minutes.

There is a school concert choir, a jazz choir, and a band program.

The school also has an active athletic program, with sports including badminton, basketball, baseball, field hockey, golf, tennis, rowing, rugby, soccer, swimming and volleyball, as well as cross-country and track and field. As the school mascot is a lion, the sports teams are generally named either as the Lions or Pride.

Lambrick Park High School hosts the Baseball and Softball Academy which provides on-the-field instruction in baseball and softball skills.

== Notable alumni ==
- Keaton Verhoeff, Canadian Ice Hockey player North Dakota Fighting Hawks
- Ravi Kahlon, former player on Canada men's national field hockey team, Member of the Legislative Assembly of British Columbia for Delta North (2017-)
- Nick Pivetta (born 1993), current Major League Baseball pitcher for the San Diego Padres
- Michael Saunders, former Major League Baseball outfielder (2016 MLB All Star) for the Toronto Blue Jays, and the Seattle Mariners
- Emma Entzminger, Softball Canada infielder (2020 Summer Olympics Bronze medalist) for the Canada women's national softball team
- Tara Moss, Canadian-Australian Author
- Nikki Chooi, Classical violinist
- Carson Vitale, Bench coach for the Miami Marlins
