= Baseball Ontario =

Sport association

Ontario Baseball Association
- Sport: Baseball
- Jurisdiction: Ontario
- Abbreviation: Baseball Ontario
- Founded: 1918
- Headquarters: Cambridge
- Location: Ontario, Canada
- President: Ed Quinlan
- Sponsor: Baseball Canada

Official website
- baseballontario.com
- (Canada)
- (Ontario)

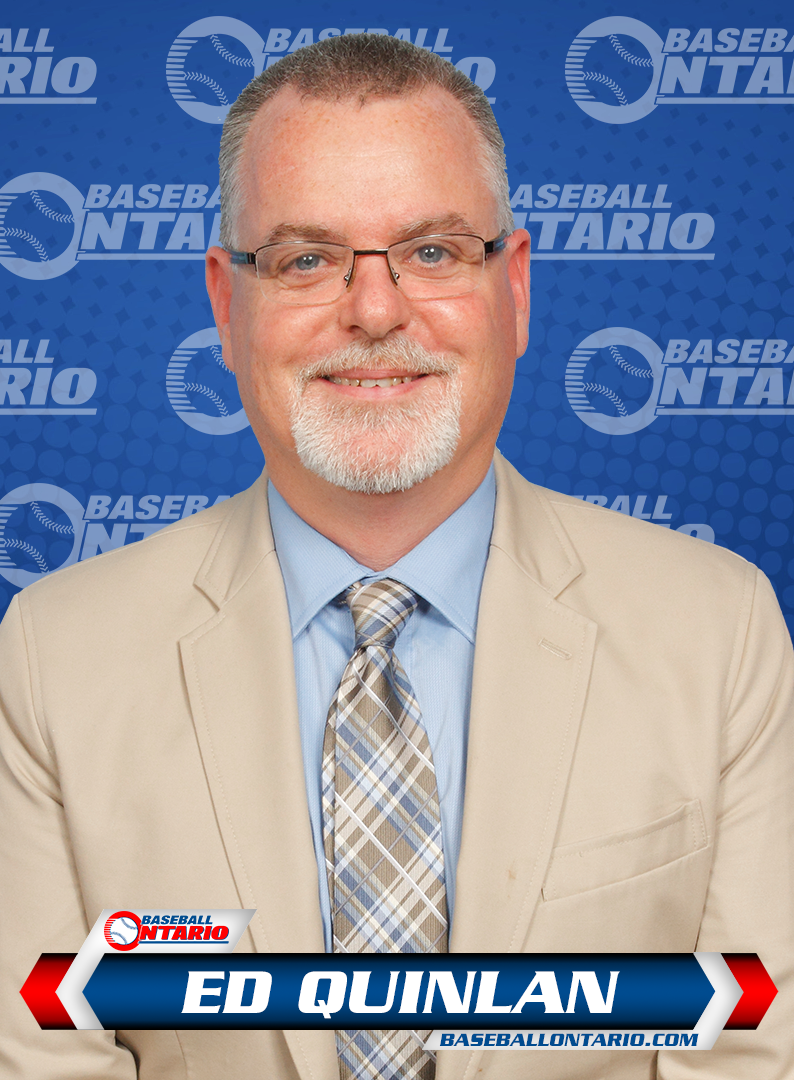
Ed Quinlan, President of Baseball Ontario

Baseball Ontario, officially known as the Ontario Baseball Association (OBA), is the provincial governing body for baseball in Ontario. The Ontario Baseball Association was founded under the name "Ontario Baseball Amateur Association" which was organized at a meeting held in Hamilton at the Central YMCA on Saturday, May 4, 1918. In 1938, the name was changed to "Ontario Baseball Association", and in 1982, the organization was incorporated as "Ontario Baseball Association, Inc". Baseball Ontario currently has its headquarters in Cambridge, Ontario.

In 2013, Baseball Ontario was named Province of the Year by Baseball Canada due, in large part to the eight medals won by Ontario teams at National Championships. Ontario medaled in all seven tournaments, winning gold at the Bantam Girls, Bantam Boys, Midget, Junior, Senior Women's and Senior Men's tournaments in addition to a silver medal at the Baseball Canada Cup and a bronze at the Senior Men's tournament.

== See also ==
- Intercounty Baseball League
- Northern Elite League
- Jack Graney Award
- List of Intercounty Baseball League Champions
