= Baseball B.C. =

Baseball governing body

- Sport: Baseball
- Jurisdiction: British Columbia
- Founded: 1968
- Headquarters: Surrey, BC
- President: Chris Balison
- CEO: David Laing
- Secretary: Ted Hotzak
- Other key staff: Scott MacKenzie
- Sponsor: Government of British Columbia, ViaSport

Official website
- baseball.bc.ca
- (Canada)
- (British Columbia)

Baseball B.C. (the B.C. Amateur Baseball Association) is the recognized provincial sport organization for amateur baseball in British Columbia. At present, the membership includes the following affiliated organizations:

- B.C. Little League Baseball
- B.C. Babe Ruth Baseball
- B.C. Premier Baseball League
- B.C. Junior Baseball Association
- B.C. Senior Baseball Association
- B.C. Baseball Umpires Association
