= Economy of Berlin =

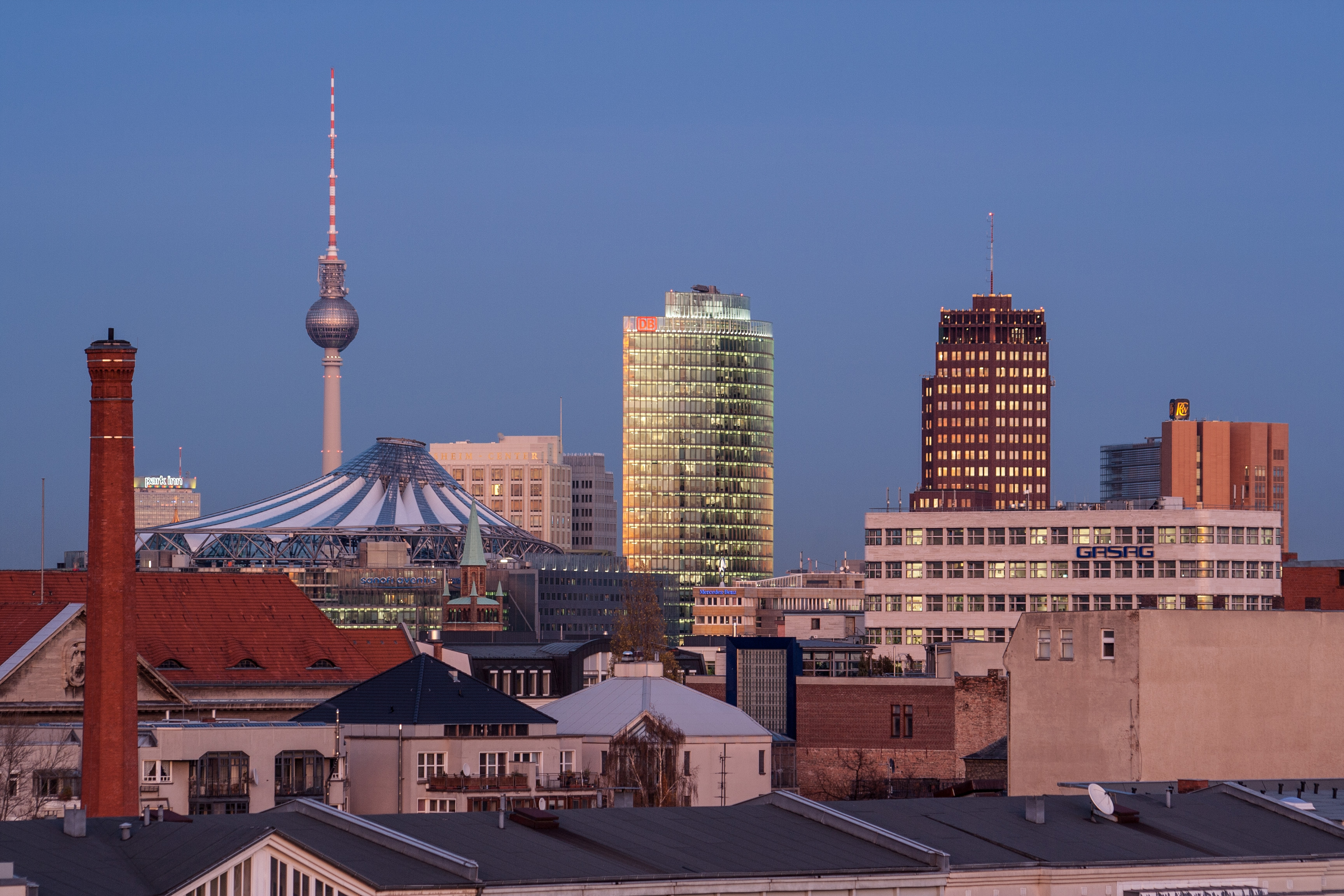
Berlin is the capital city of Germany – the 3rd largest national economy in the world by nominal GDP. It is part of the European Union and the eurozone. Berlin is a major international center of business founders, research, tourism and creative industries.

The economy of Berlin is dominated by the service sector, which accounted for 86.8% of GDP in 2025, while the producing sector, including construction, accounted for 13.2%, with manufacturing contributing 6.6%. The service economy includes public administration, health care, education and research, information and communications technology, professional and business services, retail and tourism, transport, financial services, real estate and the creative industries. In 2024, the pharmaceutical industry was Berlin's largest manufacturing branch by turnover, followed by the manufacture of computer, electronic and optical products.

During the late nineteenth and early twentieth centuries, Berlin developed into a major European center of industry and finance. Several companies that later became major German industrial and financial enterprises were founded in Berlin, including Siemens, AEG, Allianz, and Deutsche Bank.

World War II and the city's postwar division weakened this position, as many banks and corporate headquarters relocated to West Germany. During the Cold War, West Berlin relied heavily on financial support and tax incentives from West Germany, while East Berlin formed part of East Germany's centrally planned economy. As part of reunification, the Treuhandanstalt restructured or liquidated many formerly state-owned enterprises, while industrial employment fell sharply.

Following reunification, Berlin's economy became increasingly service-oriented, while information technology, media, and the creative industries grew in importance. Although the city's restoration as Germany's capital attracted national and international companies, relatively few relocated their headquarters to Berlin.

== History ==
Berlin was founded at a point where trade routes crossed the river Spree and it quickly became a commercial center. During the early modern period, the city prospered from its role as Prussian capital by manufacturing luxury goods for the Prussian court and supplies for the Prussian military.

=== Industrial Revolution ===
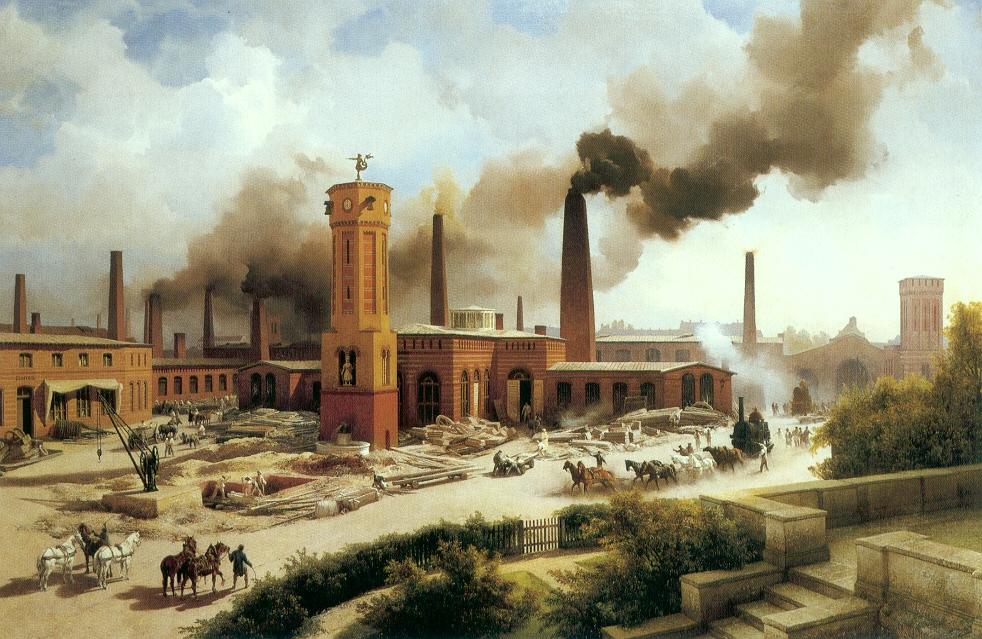
Train factory of August Borsig in 1847

During the mid-19th century, the Industrial Revolution transformed the city’s economy. Berlin became Germany’s main rail hub and a center of locomotive manufacturing. The city became a leader in the manufacture of other kinds of machinery as well, and developed an important chemical industry sector. Toward the end of the 19th century, Berlin became a world leader in the then cutting-edge sector of electrical equipment manufacturing. As the de facto center of the German Zollverein, or Customs Union, and later the seat of the Reichsbank, Berlin became Germany’s banking and financial center as well.

Berlin suffered from both the German hyperinflation of the 1920s and the Great Depression of the 1930s. The city’s economy revived as a center of weapons production under the Nazis, but it lost a pool of entrepreneurial talent when the Nazis forced Jewish businessmen to sell their holdings and ultimately massacred most who did not flee Germany.

=== After the World Wars ===
World War II severely damaged Berlin’s industrial infrastructure, and Soviet expropriation of machinery and other capital equipment as war reparations further damaged Berlin’s industrial base. Soviet restrictions on transport impeded communication with West Germany and ended hopes that Berlin would resume a role as Germany’s financial center; most banks established headquarters in Frankfurt. In East Berlin, socialist central planners rebuilt a manufacturing sector, but one that was not competitive internationally or responsive to market demand. West Berlin’s economy grew increasingly dependent on state subsidies and on its role as an educational and research center.

=== Reunification ===
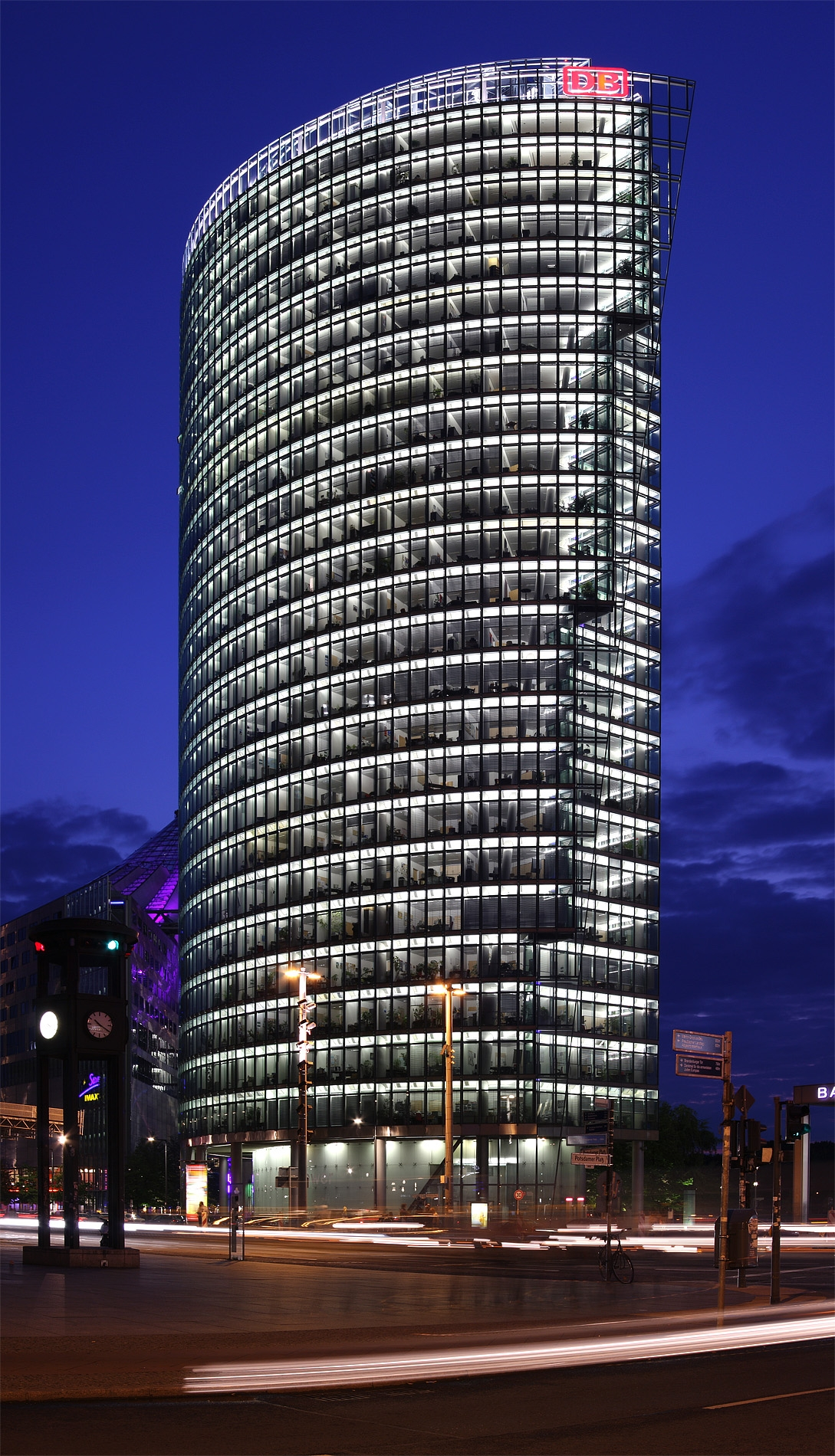
Deutsche Bahn headquarters

Berlin’s and Germany’s unification brought the collapse of many of East Berlin’s producers, which could not compete with market-disciplined Western competitors. Massive unemployment was only partly compensated by the growth of jobs in the construction and infrastructural sectors involved in rebuilding and upgrading East Berlin’s infrastructure. The move of the federal government from Bonn to Berlin in 1999 brought some economic stimulus and tens of thousands of jobs from government employees, parliamentary services, lobbyists and journalism to Berlin. Berlin’s service sectors have also benefited from improved transportation and communications links to the surrounding region.

While some manufacturing remains in the city (Siemens and Bayer Schering Pharma have headquarters in Berlin), the service sectors have become the city’s economic mainstay. Research and development have gained significance, and Berlin was ranked among the top three innovative regions in the EU (after Baden-Württemberg and the Île-de-France in 2006. In the same year unemployment remained high, at 16.5% as of 2006.

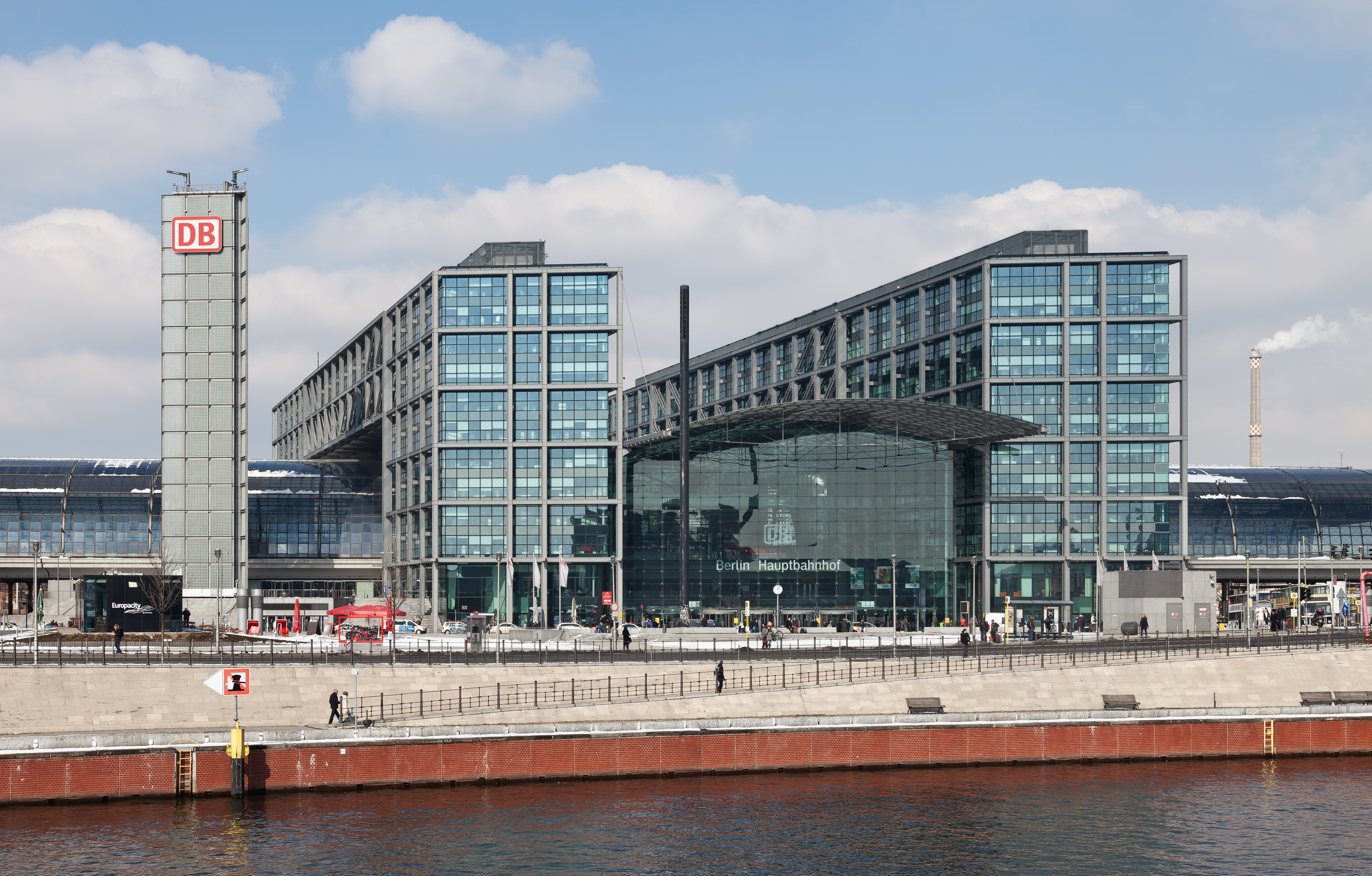
Berlin Hauptbahnhof

Fast-growing sectors are communications, life sciences, mobility and services with information and communication technologies, media and music, advertising and design, biotechnology and environmental services, transportation and medical engineering. Since 2015 Berlin is the top congress city in the world and is home to one of Europe's biggest convention centers in the form of the CityCube Berlin (formerly Internationales Congress Centrum). It contributes to the increasing tourism sector encompassing 592 hotels with 90,700 beds (2007 figures) and numbered over 22 million overnight stays by 9.8 million tourists in 2011. Berlin has established itself as the third most visited city destination in the European Union.

Berlin's economy has grown continuously above the German average in the period from 2005 to 2013. This trend is set to continue, with important improvements to infrastructure, such as the biggest European crossing station, Berlin Hauptbahnhof (inaugurated 2006), the opening of the 3rd biggest German airport, Berlin Brandenburg Airport, in 2020 replacing the decrepit Tegel Airport which was not fit to serve as a modern airline hub.

Also, the Berlin music scene, attracting young tourists flying in for the city's clubs has become an increasingly important part of the economy and is set to gain the support of the city music board modeled after the German film promotion authority.

== Workforce ==
- Number of total employees (III/2021): 2,098,400 citizens
- New jobs in 2016: +46,200 (+2.5%)
- Unemployment rate (December 2021): 8.8%
- Number of unemployed people (December 2021): 179,291
- Number of job offers in Berlin and Brandenburg in 2017: 46,000

== Companies ==
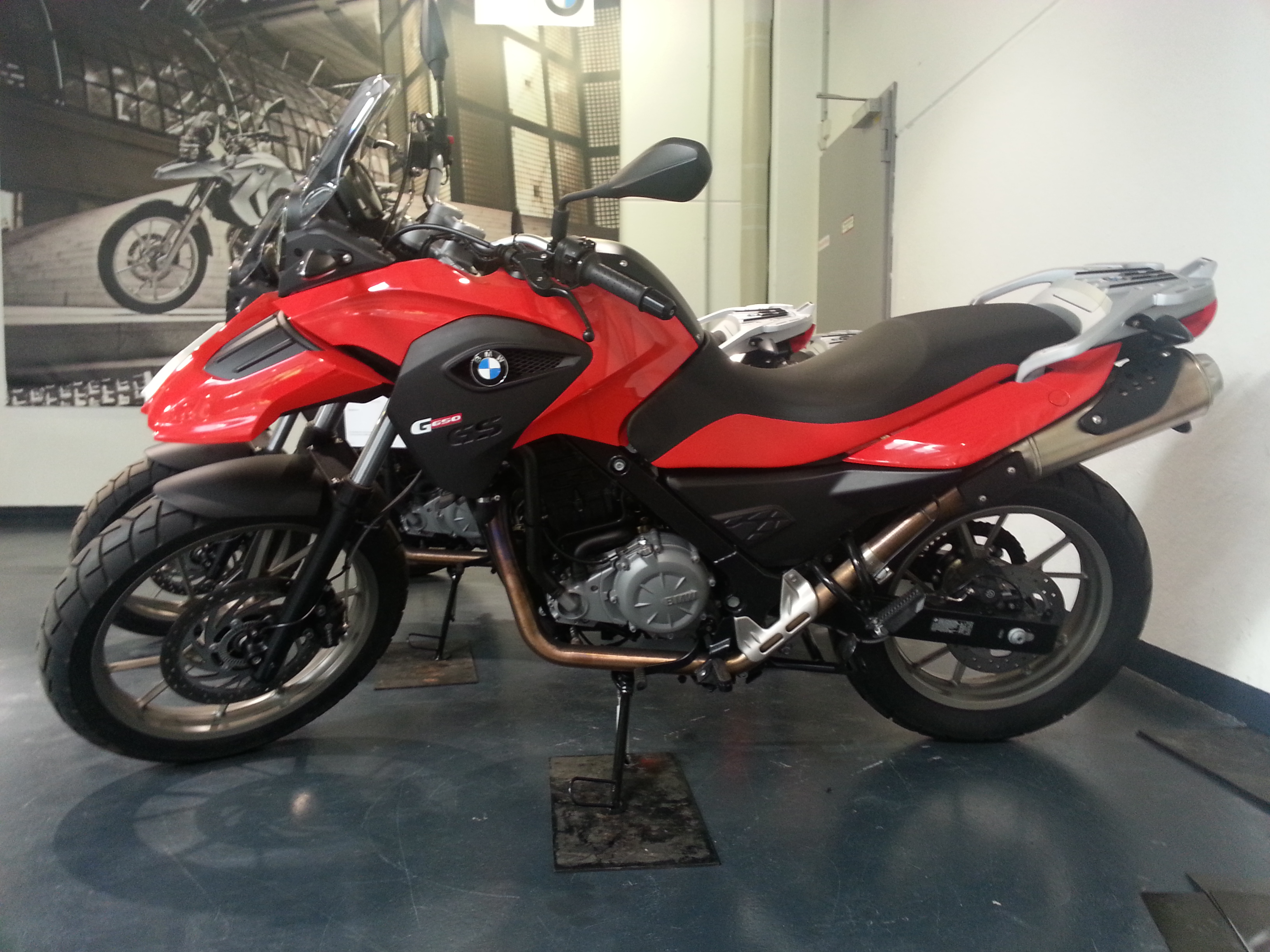
BMW operates a large motorcycle factory in Berlin.

The state-owned railway, Deutsche Bahn, has its headquarters in Berlin. Many German and international companies have business or service centres in the city.

Among the 20 largest employers in Berlin are the Deutsche Bahn, the hospital providers, Charité and Vivantes, the local public transport provider, BVG, Siemens, and the telecommunications company Deutsche Telekom. Daimler manufactures cars, and BMW manufactures motorcycles in Berlin. Bayer Pharmaceuticals and Berlin Chemie are major pharmaceutical companies headquartered in the city.

Some other notable companies with their headquarters in Berlin are 50Hertz Transmission GmbH, Axel Springer SE, Bombardier Transportation, Bundesdruckerei, KPMG Deutschland, Alba Group, Otis Deutschland, Universal Music Germany, Coca-Cola European Partners Deutschland, Delivery Hero, Lloyds Banking Group Europe, solarisBank, N26, Pfizer Germany, Zalando, ImmoScout24, GASAG, HelloFresh, Deutsche Wohnen, and Vattenfall Deutschland.

The top 10 largest employers in Berlin and the surrounding districts in 2025:

Rank	Employer	Employees	Sector
1	Deutsche Bahn (including S-Bahn Berlin)	26,894	Transport and logistics
2	Charité	25,256	Health care
3	Vivantes	20,649	Health care
4	Edeka	17,888	Retail
5	Berliner Verkehrsbetriebe (BVG)	16,800	Public transport
6	Rewe Markt	13,000	Retail
7	Deutsche Post DHL	11,500*	Postal services and logistics
8	Tesla	11,000*	Automotive
9	Mercedes-Benz	9,500*	Automotive
10	Johannesstift Diakonie	9,291	Health and social care

* Editorial estimate.

== Tourism ==
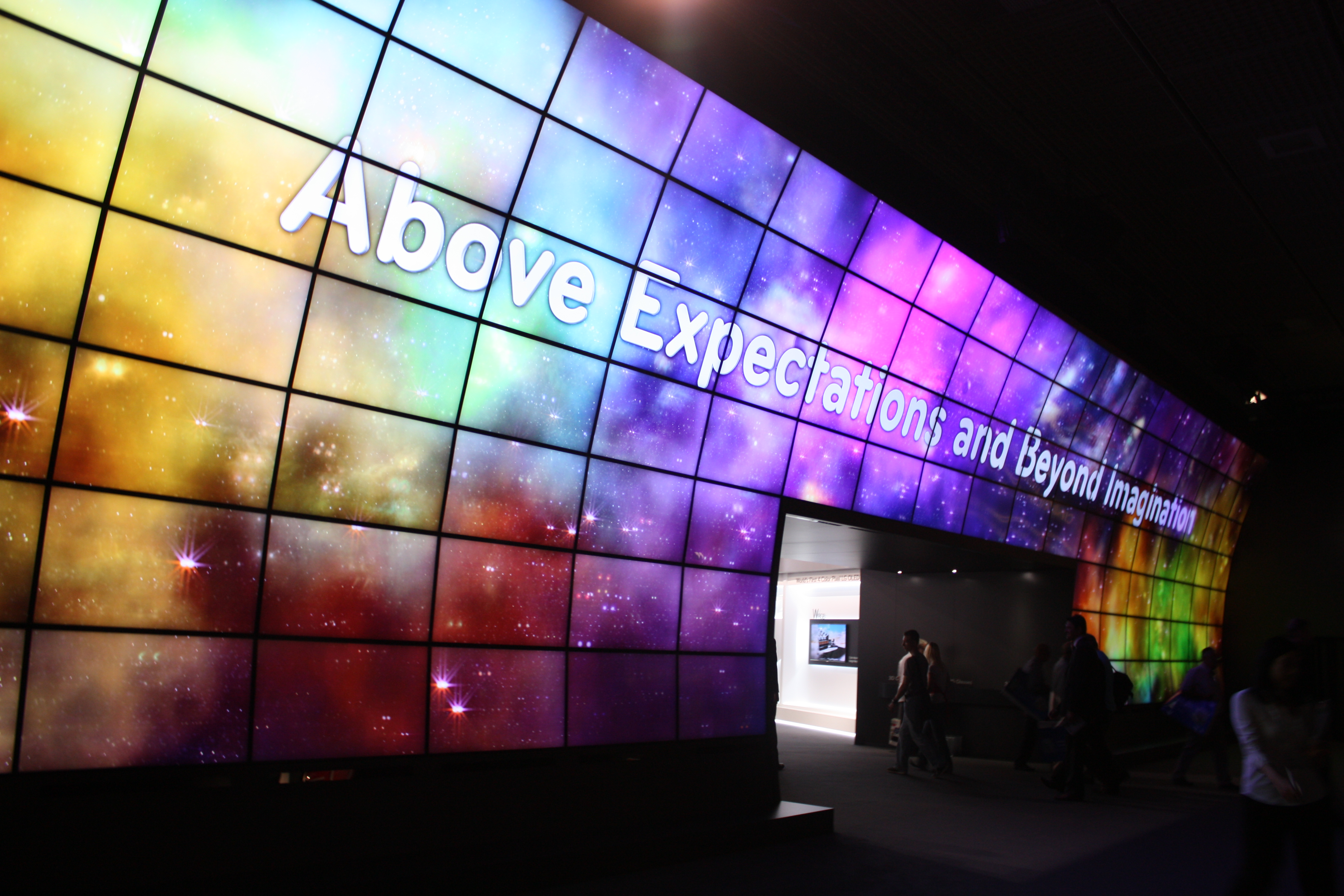
Consumer electronics trade fair IFA

Berlin has 788 hotels with 134,399 beds as of December 2014. In 2016 the visitor figures for Berlin have broken records with 31.1 million overnight stays (+2.7%) and 12.9 million hotel guests (+2.9%). Berlin has a yearly total of estimated 135 million day visitors, which puts it in third place among the most-visited city destinations in Europe. International visitors made up 46 per cent of the overnight stays in 2016. The largest visitor groups are from Germany, the United Kingdom, the United States, Spain, Italy, the Netherlands, France, Switzerland, Denmark, Sweden and Poland.

According to ICCA statistics in 2015 Berlin became the top organizer of conferences in the world hosting 195 international meetings. It is home to one Europe's biggest convention centers at the Messe Berlin. Several large-scale trade fairs like the consumer electronics trade fair IFA, the ILA Berlin Air Show, Berlin Fashion Week (including the Bread & Butter), Green Week ("Grüne Woche"), the transport fair InnoTrans, the adult entertainment fair Venus and the tourism fair ITB are held in the city.

== Media ==
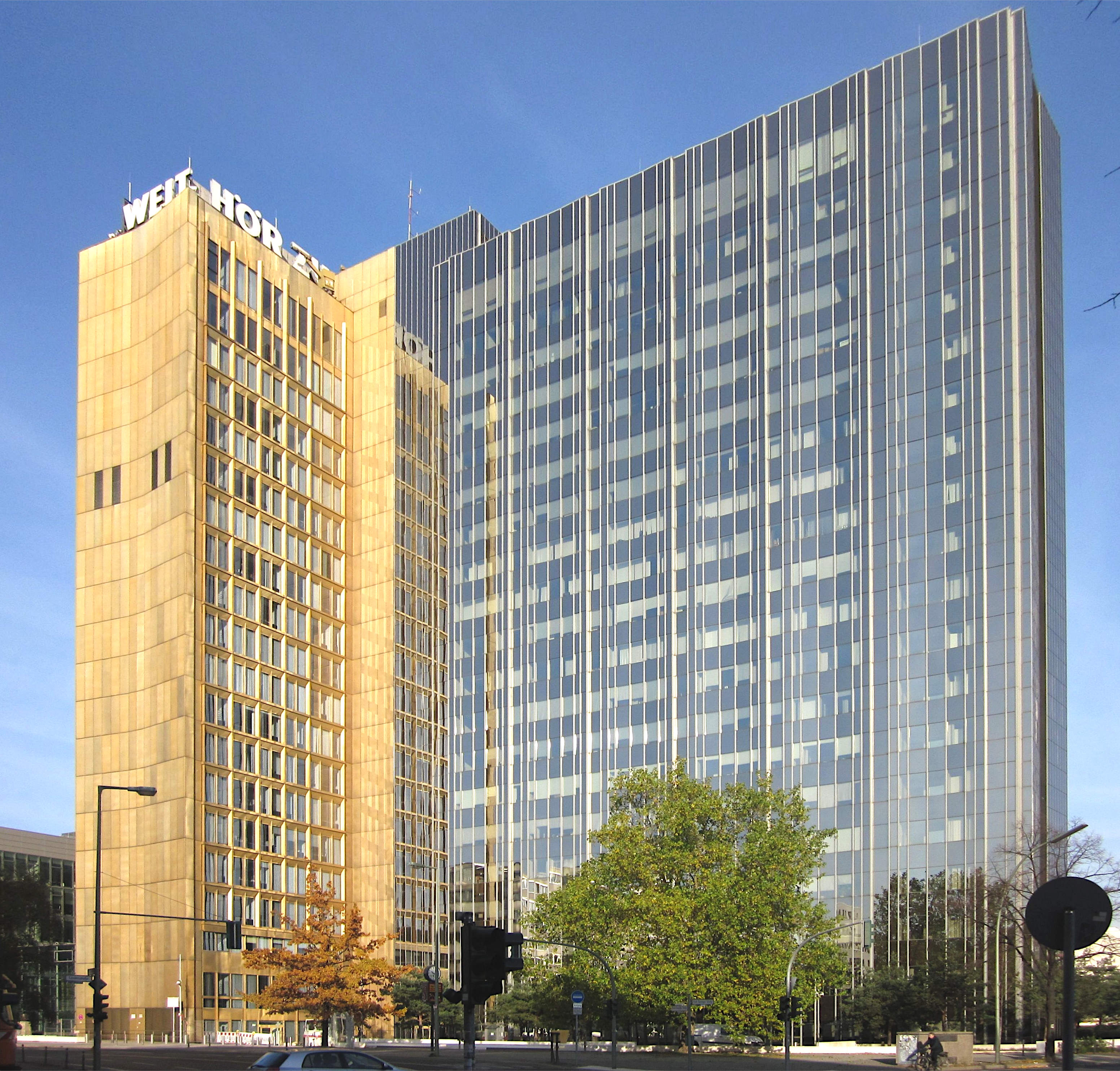
Headquarter of the Axel Springer SE

Berlin is home to many international and regional television and radio stations. The public broadcaster RBB has its headquarters in Berlin as well as the commercial broadcasters MTV Germany, Comedy Central and Welt. German international public broadcaster Deutsche Welle has its TV production unit in Berlin, and most national German broadcasters have a studio in the city including Das Erste, ZDF and RTL.

Berlin has Germany's largest number of daily newspapers, with numerous local broadsheets (Berliner Morgenpost, Berliner Zeitung, Der Tagesspiegel), and three major tabloids, as well as national dailies of varying sizes, each with a different political affiliation, such as Die Welt, Junge Welt, Neues Deutschland, and Die Tageszeitung. The Exberliner, a monthly magazine, is Berlin's English-language periodical focusing on arts and entertainment. Berlin is also the headquarters of the two major German-language publishing houses Walter de Gruyter and Axel Springer, each of which publish books, periodicals, and multimedia products.

== Creative industries ==
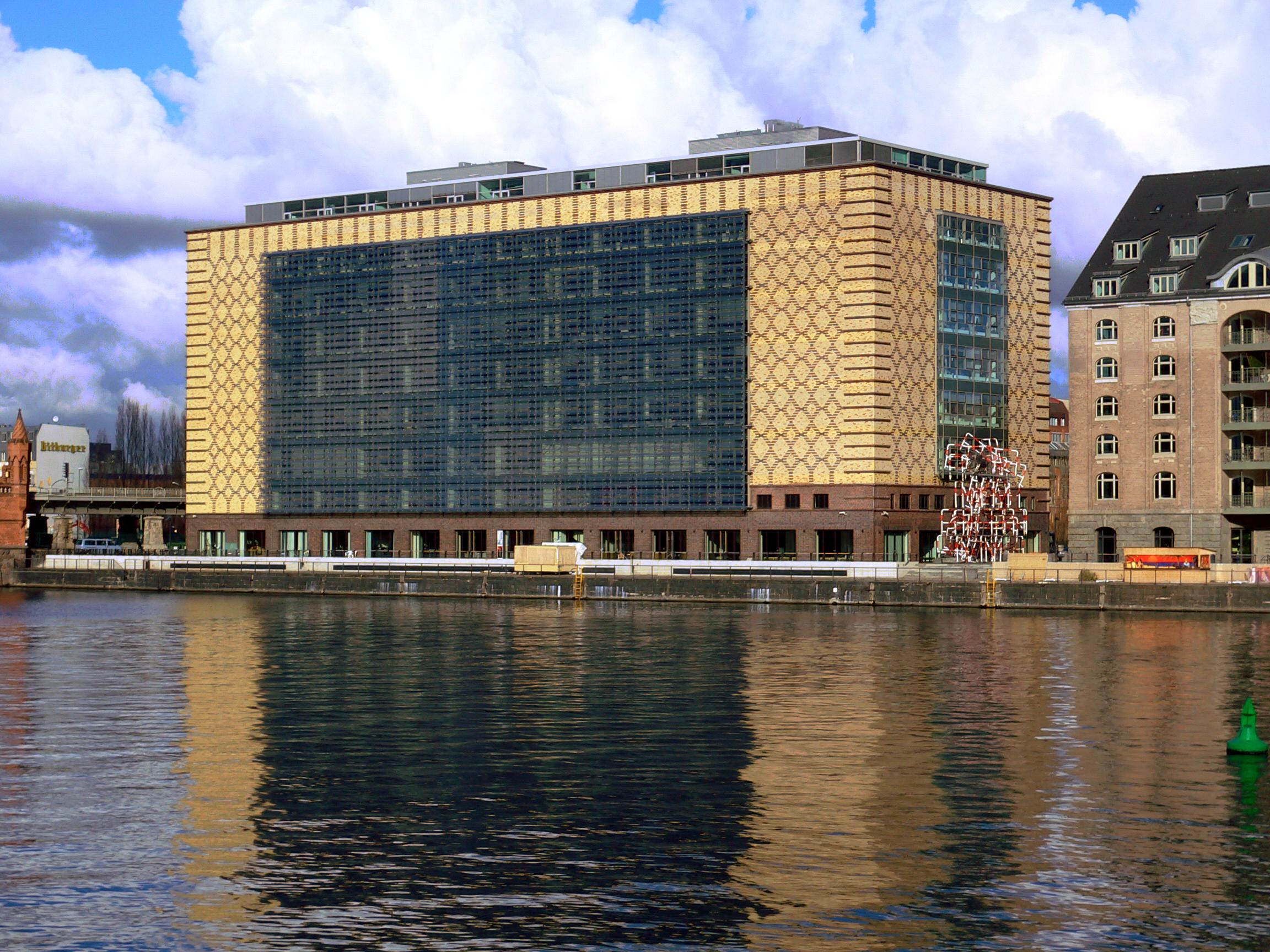
Universal Music Germany HQ

Industries that do business in the creative arts and entertainment are an important and sizable sector of the economy of Berlin. The creative arts sector comprises music, film, advertising, architecture, art, design, fashion, performing arts, publishing, R&D, software, TV, radio, and video games. Around 22,600 creative enterprises, predominantly SMEs, generated over 18,6 billion Euro in total revenue. Berlin's creative industries have contributed an estimated 20% of Berlin's gross domestic product in 2005.

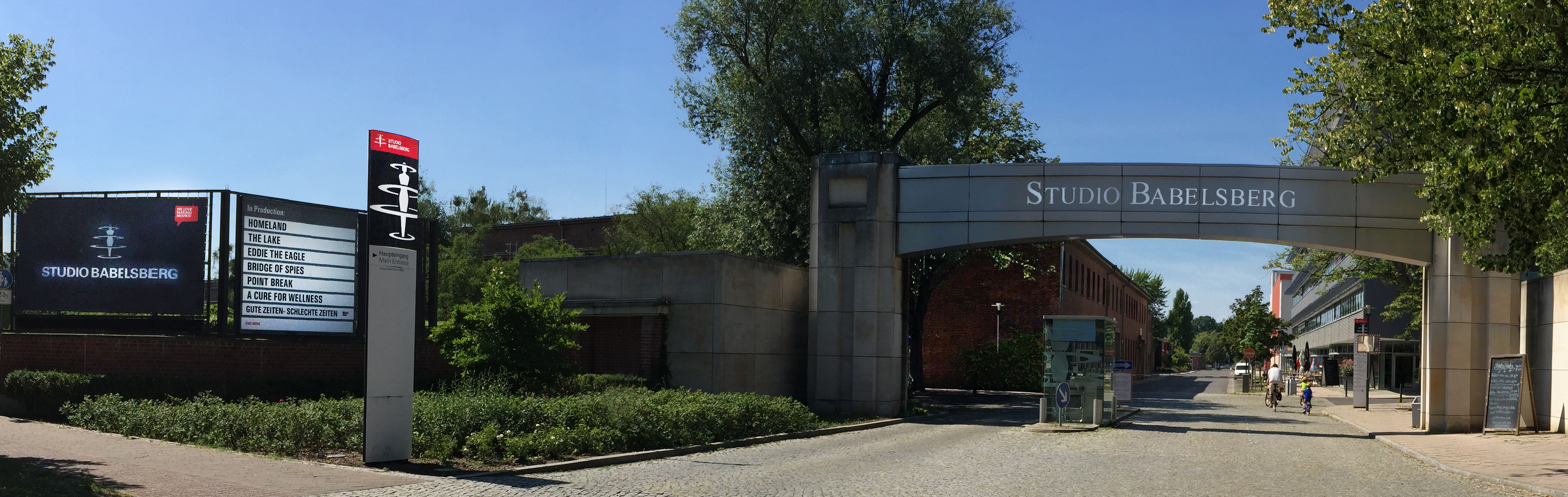
Babelsberg movie studios

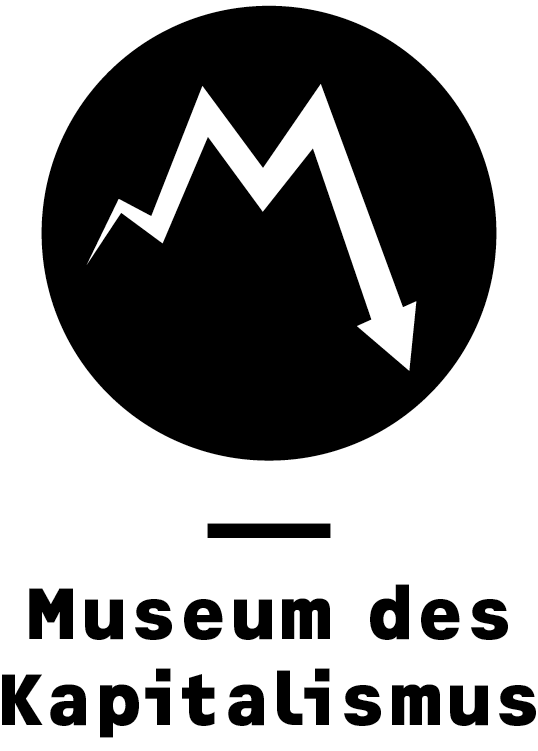
Berlin's Museum des Kapitalismus presents and questions this topic in programs

Berlin is an important center in the European and German film industry. It is home to more than 1000 film and television production companies, 270 movie theaters, and around 300 national and international co-productions are filmed in the region every year. The historic Babelsberg Studios and the production company UFA are located in nearby Potsdam, as is the Filmuniversität Babelsberg. Companies like Rise FX create special effects for international film productions. The city is also home of the European Film Academy and the German Film Academy, and hosts the annual Berlin Film Festival. Founded in 1951, the festival has been celebrated annually in February since 1978. With over 430,000 admissions it is the largest publicly attended film festival in the world.

== Education and research ==
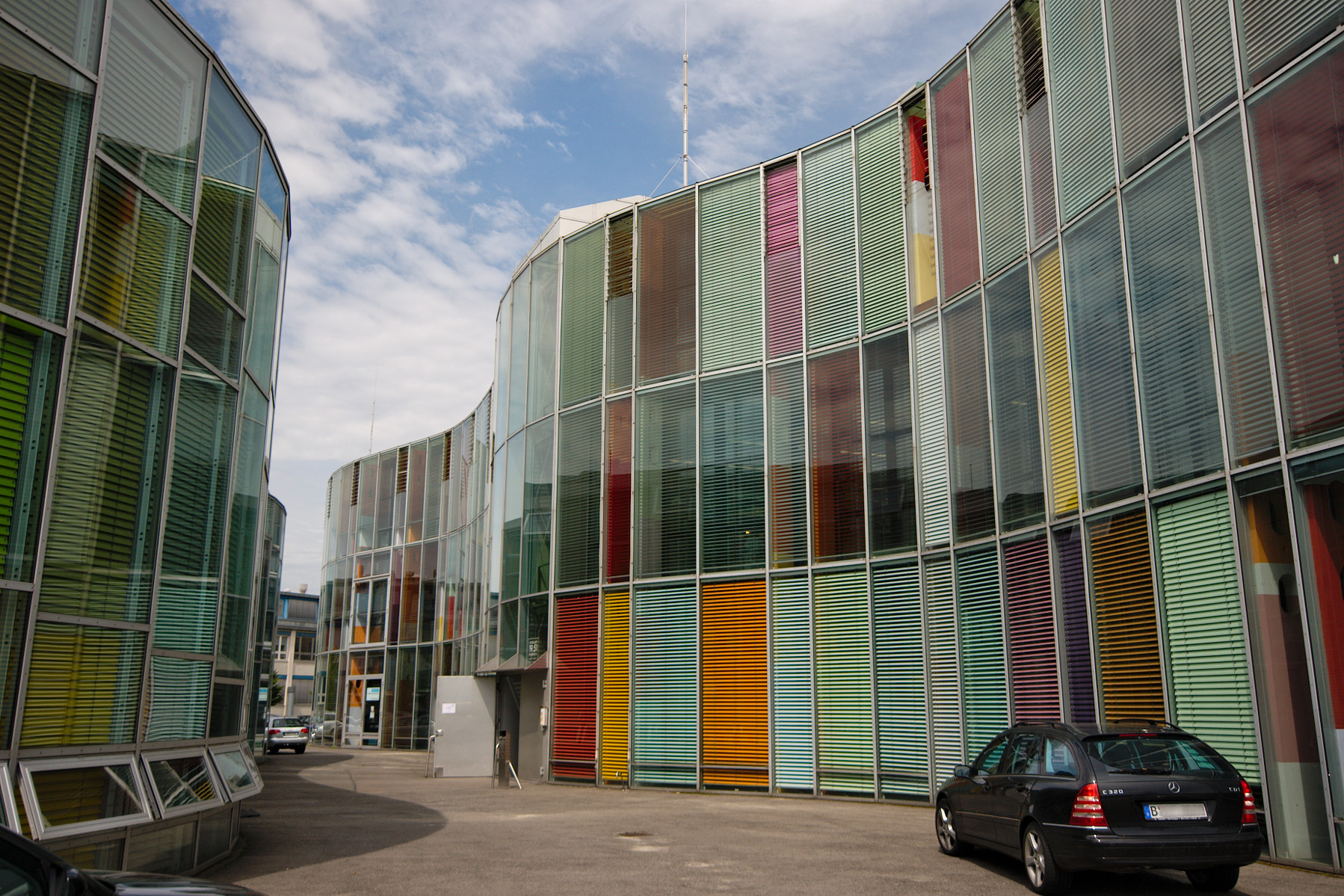
The Science and Technology Park in Adlershof

The Berlin-Brandenburg capital region is one of the most prolific centers of higher education and research in the European Union. The city has four public research universities and 27 private, professional and technical colleges (Hochschulen), offering a wide range of disciplines. Over 180,000 students (+1.8% compared to 2015/16) were enrolled in the winter term of 2016/17. The three largest universities combined have approximately 100,000 enrolled students. They are the Humboldt Universität zu Berlin (HU Berlin) with 34,000 students, the Freie Universität Berlin (Free University of Berlin, FU Berlin) with about 34,500 students, and the Technische Universität Berlin (TU Berlin) with 30,000 students. The Universität der Künste (UdK) has about 4,000 students and the Berlin School of Economics and Law has enrollment of about 10,000 students.

The city has a high density of research institutions, such as the Fraunhofer Society, Gottfried Wilhelm Leibniz Scientific Community and the Max Planck Society, which are independent of, or only loosely connected to its universities. A total number of 62,000 scientists are working in research and development. The city is one of the centers of knowledge and innovation communities (Future Information and Communication Society and Climate Change Mitigation and Adaptation) of the European Institute of Innovation and Technology (EIT).

== See also ==
- Economic history of Germany
- List of people from Berlin
