= Goodfood Market =

Canadian online grocery

Goodfood Market Corp.
- Type: Public
- Traded as: TSX: FOOD
- Industry: Food / Grocery
- Founded: 2014
- Founder: Jonathan Ferrari; Neil Cuggy
- Headquarters: Montreal, Quebec, Canada
- Key people: Jonathan Ferrari (CEO); Neil Cuggy (COO)
- Revenue: 150 millions $ (2025)
- Operating income: 37,5 millions $ (2025)
- Net income: 5,375 millions $ (2025)
- Number of employees: 750 (2025)
- Website: https://www.makegoodfood.ca

Goodfood Market Corp., doing business as Goodfood, is a Canadian online grocery, home meal and meal kit company, based in Montreal, Quebec. Goodfood reached 200,000 subscribers as of August 2019, an estimated 40% to 45% of the meal kit market. It is listed on the Toronto Stock Exchange under the ticker FOOD.

Goodfood has evolved from a meal kit focused company to an online grocery and home meal provider. The company offers meal kits, breakfast meals, grocery items, snacks and ready-to-eat products. Goodfood's products are delivered across most of Canada, reaching 95% of the population.

== History ==
=== Founding Under the Name Culiniste ===
Goodfood was established in 2014 by Jonathan Ferrari and Neil Cuggy, two former investment banking analysts at RBC Capital Markets, under the original name Culiniste. They were soon joined by Raffi Krikorian.

The service grew in popularity and began enrolling hundreds of subscribers per week. One of the Company's early adopters was Anne-Marie Withenshaw, a television and radio personality. Withenshaw eventually endorsed Goodfood and helped it grow in popularity across Quebec and Canada.

=== Rebranding to Goodfood ===
In 2016, the company rebranded itself under the name Goodfood.

=== Going public ===
In June 2017, Goodfood became publicly traded on the Toronto Stock Exchange. The transaction, completed through a form of reverse takeover, raised $21 million of capital. The funds raised were earmarked for growth and were used in large part to expand Goodfood's subscriber base and facility size. After the closing of the transaction, Goodfood began trading on the TSX under the ticker FOOD. The Company later raised additional equity to expand to Calgary, a second facility in Montreal and a new facility in Vancouver.

Goodfood experienced significant growth after going public: its subscriber base increased 35% to 31,000 in the quarter ending on August 31, 2017, and another 45% to 45,000 in the quarter ending on November 30, 2017. Goodfood reached the 200,000 mark as of August 31, 2019, with an increase of 125% in subscriber count year-over-year.

As of November 30, 2020, Goodfood has 306,000 active subscribers.

As of February 28, 2021, Goodfood has 319,000 active subscribers.

In October 2022, Goodfood CEO addressed rumours of a takeover by indicating that ongoing conversations were taking place, without confirming if they were about a takeover.

In August 2026, Goodfood filed for and received creditor protection as part of a restructuring process. It was reported by CBC News that the court filings showed that the company had launched an on-demand grocery division in November 2021 but abandoned the concept in October 2023 after it failed to achieve profitability.

== Business ==
Its business originally centred around preparing meal kits delivered to subscribers. It has broadened its offering to include: ready-to-eat meals; grocery items such as olive oil, peanut butter and tea leaves; and breakfast products including smoothies and omelettes. Within its meal kit business, Goodfood launched Yumm, a cheaper meal kit service offering simpler recipes with fewer ingredients.

Its most significant rivals include HelloFresh (based in Germany, and subsidiary Chef's Plate), Cook it and MissFresh (a Metro Inc. grocery giant subsidiary, based in Quebec).
