= Yewande Komolafe =

Nigerian food writer

Yewande Komolafe is a Nigerian food writer, author, and food stylist. She is best known for her work introducing Nigerian food to audiences in the US. Komolafe joined The New York Times as a cooking editor in February 2021.

== Early life ==
Komolafe was born in Berlin, and German was her first language. She moved to Lagos, Nigeria with her parents when she was less than two years old. At the age of 16, she moved to the United States for studies. Komolafe graduated from the University of Maryland Baltimore County with a degree in psychology and biology. She earned a culinary degree from Baltimore International College where she did both pastries and culinary arts.

According to Komolafe, while she was in culinary arts school, an administrative error led to the deletion of her school record which caused her to lose her student status. Komolafe opted to remain in the United States, even though she was undocumented. She was not able to leave the country for twenty years because she would not be allowed to return. Komolafe wrote about ways to improve conditions for workers in the restaurant industry. As of 2018, Komolafe had received her green card and was able to go to Nigeria with her husband Mark.

Komolafe is the fourth generation of women in her family who have made a career out of food, and Komolafe grew up knowing she wanted to be involved in food. Her mother is a food scientist who developed foods for Cadbury and presented dinner menus each night when she gathered the family to eat by ringing a cow bell.

== Career ==
Komolafe worked in restaurants for 15 years, starting first as a pastry chef in French pastry kitchens. She has worked in restaurants in Baltimore and Atlanta (Restaurant Eugene). In New York, she was one of the first employees at Momofuku Milk Bar that is run by Christina Tosi. While working at Saveur as a kitchen assistant she got her first experiences with recipe development and testing, and found she enjoyed combination of science and food. During her presentation on a typical Nigerian lunch, she described how cooking foods is learned by watching rather than written recipes. Komolafe and Priya Krishna discussed the oral tradition of recipes and the extra burden of non-white recipe developers in a 2020 conversation published in Bon Appétit.

In 2016, Komolafe started a dinner series called "My Immigrant Food is..." which she describes as a way to explore the connections between people and food. Komolafe collaborates with Oko Farms in Brooklyn, where Yemi Amu produces fresh produce that Komolafe incorporates into her menu. In a 2018 interview with Rachel Bongiorno, Komolafe discusses how she started the dinners as a means to handle the anti-immigrant feeling in the country during the 2016 elections, and noted that the dinners allow her to be a voice for immigrants. During the meals, Komolafe cooks Nigerian food and her first dinner series started with pepper soup, a Nigerian classic which she prepared with input from her mother who still lives in Lagos. During the dinner Komolafe provides discussion questions to foster conversations among the dinner guests.

Komolafe is also a food stylist and her work has appeared in the New York Times, Food52, and Munchies. In 2018, she advised Alabama Chanin on menu development for her restaurant. Mark Bittman invited Komolafe to cook for a 2018 fundraiser at the James Beard House, and Komolafe interviewed him for the release of the 20th anniversary edition of his book, How to Cook Everything. She has also contributed recipes to The Rise, Marcus Samuelsson's cookbook that was released in 2020.

Komolafe joined The New York Times as a cooking editor in February 2021. Prior to joining the staff, her Ten Essential Nigerian recipes was published in the New York Times in 2019. In August 2021, Tejal Rao launched NYT Cooking's vegetarian newsletter, "The Veggie", which Rao and Komolafe discussed on WNYC's All Of It show with Alison Stewart.

Her 2023 cookbook, My Everyday Lagos Kitchen, was nominated for a 2024 James Beard Award in the International category.

== Publications ==
- Komolafe, Yewande (2021). Waffles + Mochi: Get Cooking!. Clarkson Potter. p. 112. ISBN 9780593234099.
- Komolafe, Yewande (2023). My everyday Lagos kitchen: Nigerian cooking at home and in the diaspora. Clarkson Potter/Ten Speed. ISBN 978-1-9848-5893-1. OCLC 1236091493.

== Personal life ==
In December 2023, Komolafe was taken to a hospital in New York City with flu-like symptoms which turned out to be the onset of a sickle-cell crisis (she has sickle-cell anemia, an inherited blood disorder). As a result of complications, she was put in an induced coma, and after she regained consciousness she was told in March of 2024 that both her legs would have to be amputated, as well as several fingers on both hands. She now has prosthetic hands and legs, but continues to cook and write for the New York Times food section.

Komolafe lives in Brooklyn with her husband Mark and their daughters.
