= Meal kit =

Subscription service–foodservice business model

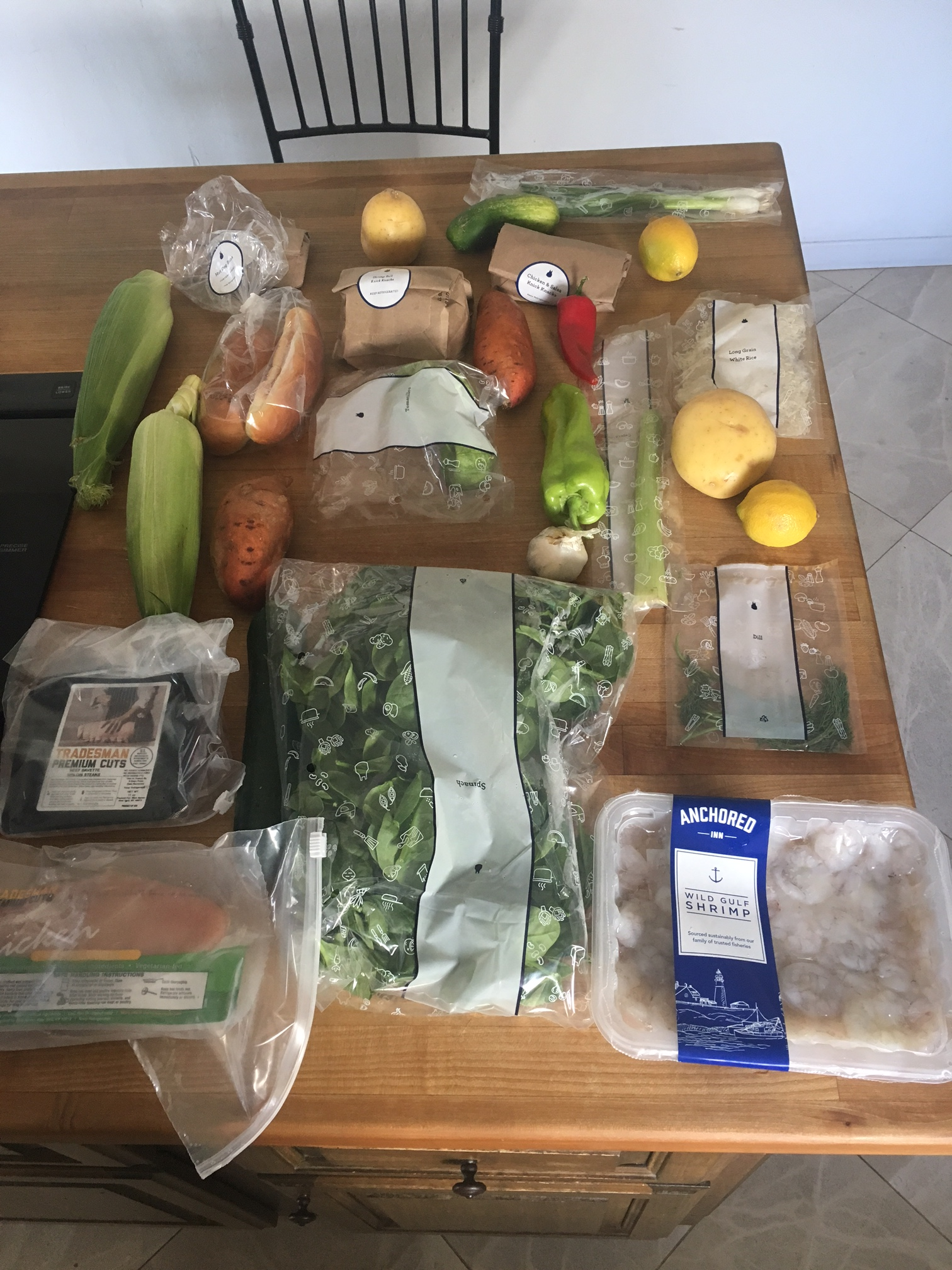
The contents of a Blue Apron meal kit

A meal kit is a subscription service–foodservice business model where a company sends customers pre-portioned and sometimes partially prepared food ingredients and recipes to prepare home-cooked meals. Services that send pre-cooked meals are called meal delivery services. This subscription model has been cited as an example of the personalization of the food and beverage industry.

A meal kit is not to be confused with convenience food, which is cooked and "prepared" at a kitchen facility before shipment—typically in a refrigerated container.

== History ==
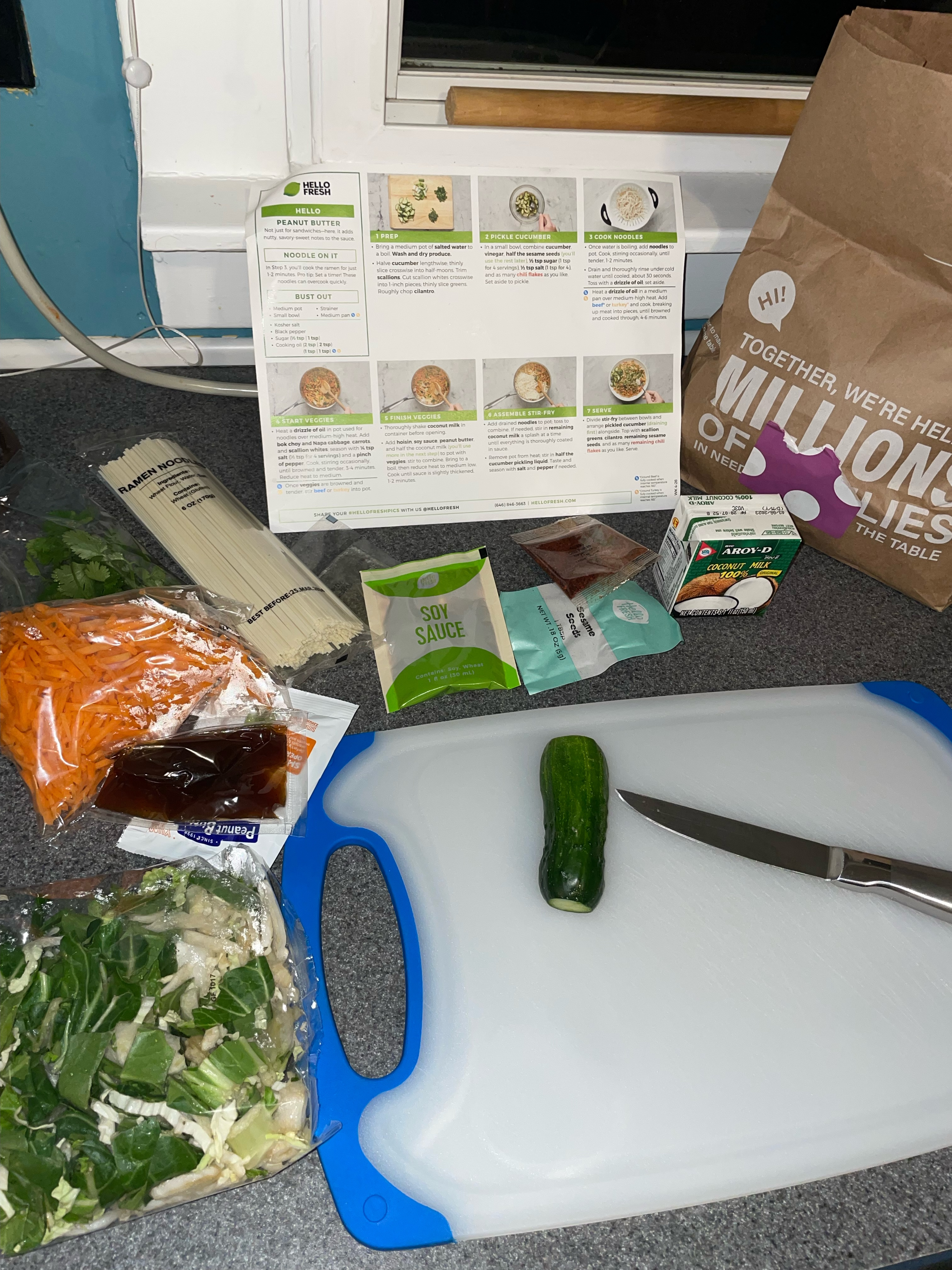
The contents of a HelloFresh meal kit

The business model originated in Denmark with the launch of Mad til Døren in 2003 followed by RetNemt in 2006. It later spread to Sweden, which some sources describe as the country of origin, crediting either Kicki Theander's launch of Middagsfrid (roughly translated as "dinnertime bliss") in 2007, or Linas Matkasse, launched in 2008 by siblings Niklas Aronsson and Lina Gebäck. Middagsfrid quickly spread to several other Northern European countries, and inspired a range of competitors. Three meal kit companies entered the U.S. market roughly simultaneously in 2012: Blue Apron, HelloFresh (which was already operating in Europe), and Plated.

== Business ==
According to Inc Magazine, as of March 2017 there were over 150 meal kit companies in the United States. By 2025, the meal kit business was estimated to reach USD6.14 billion globally. Supermarkets have tried to combat meal kits' popularity by making their own kits sold at store's locations. Blue Apron was the service most used by customers surveyed by Morning Consult in 2017, followed by HelloFresh and Plated. Although companies and the category have had rapid growth, they face a substantial challenge in retaining subscribers: many customers only use the services once, lured by offers of free meals, and few people continue past the 5-8 week mark: just 6% of customers surveyed by Morning Consult were still subscribed to most meal kit services after 3 months (although Blue Apron did much better than average at 12% 3-month retention).

Online meal kit delivery services (OMDS) businesses increase consumer participation to provide both products and services to consumers by delivering ingredients and preparing meals. Following the Covid-19 Pandemic lockdowns, the meal kit industry advanced rapidly, by 2020 HelloFresh reported a 122.6% Y-o-Y revenue growth in Q2. The vegetarian segment in 2021 held the largest revenue share of 63.7%, continuing to be the dominant growth for protein consumers. However, the compound annual growth rate for vegetarian meal kits is a projected 17.6% from 2022 to 2030, as plant-based and cruelty-free diets increase around the world. The meal kit industry is worth $5 billion as of 2022 and projected to increase to $11.6 billion by 2023.

== Cost ==
Cost is one of the barriers to use for meal kit services. As of early 2023, Everyplate is one of the cheapest meal kit services with plans starting at around $6 a serving. The median meal kit ranges from $9 to $10 a serving, and includes companies such as HelloFresh, Blue Apron and Home Chef. Some of the more expensive meal kit services range from $10 to $13 a serving from services such as Sunbasket and Green Chef.

== List of notable meal kit services ==
- Blue Apron
- Cook it
- Goodfood
- Gousto
- HelloFresh
- Home Chef
- Mindful Chef
- My Food Bag
- Plated
- Purple Carrot
- Sunbasket
- Tovala

== Environmental impact ==
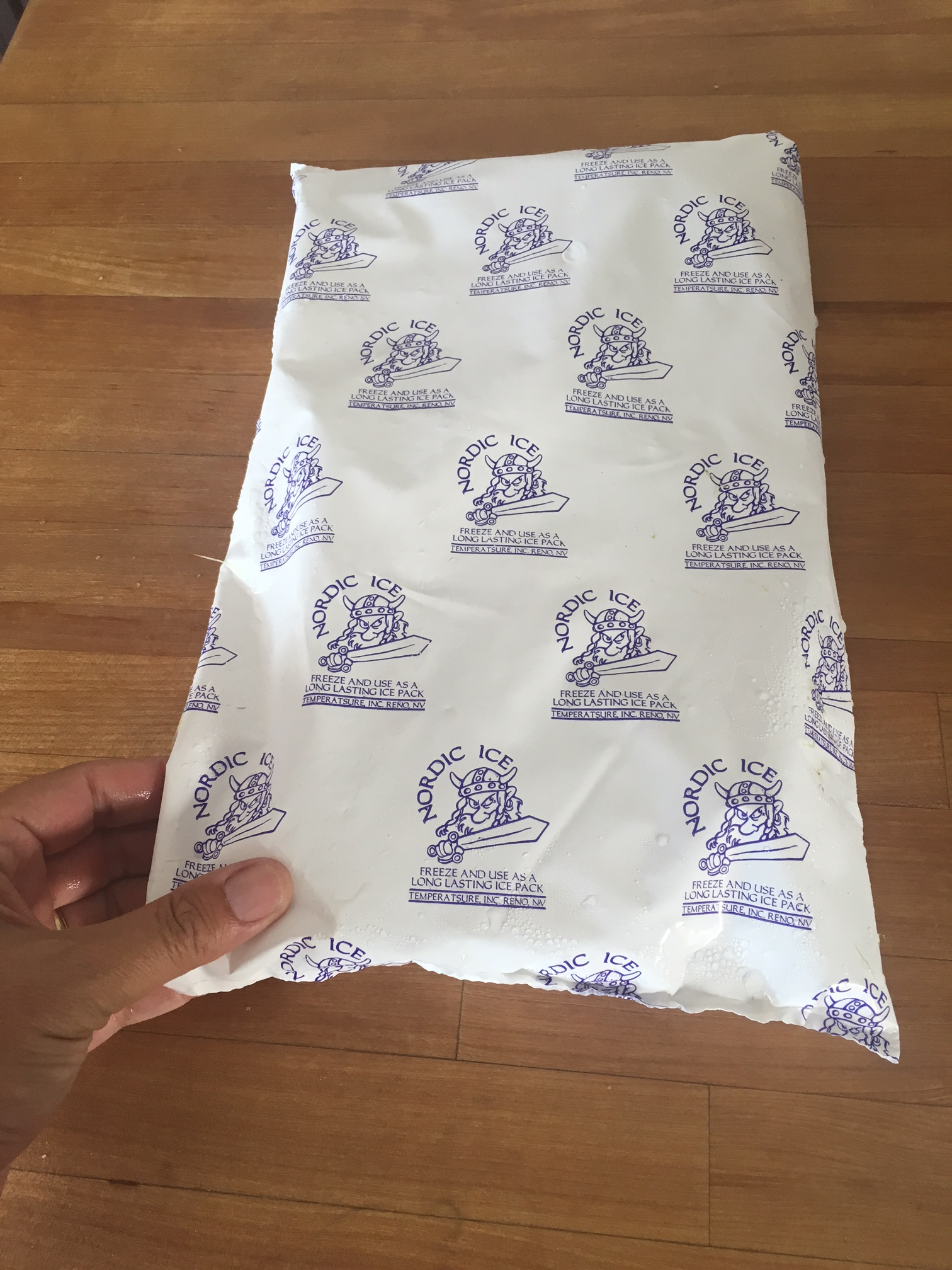
Meal kit refrigerated gel pack used during shipping

Environmental impacts of meal kit delivery services include the following:

On one hand, the industry has come under criticism for the difficulty recycling the freezer gel packs included with the kits to keep meats and dairy products refrigerated during shipping. The active ingredient in many gel packs is sodium polyacrylate, a non-toxic powder that can stay cold when saturated with water and frozen.

Despite packaging concerns, meal kit dinners, on average, reduce greenhouse gas emissions by approximately 30% running on delivery routes, compared to grocery store visits which require more energy and frequency as individuals transport there and back. Meal kits may reduce food waste by providing the precise measured amount of ingredients for use, while ingredients are purchased in larger quantities at grocery stores.

Customers who rely on in-store grocery shopping would have to maintain less than one grocery visit per week to reach energy saving equivalence to packaging and transportation of meal kits. When measuring the supply chain from start to finish, the life cycle environmental impact of grocery retailers is much higher than simplified transportation of meal delivery kits from supplier to home.

== Nutritional value ==
Studies on meal kit delivery services in Australia found that although meals contained a variety of vegetables in their servings, meals were measured to be considerably high in fat and exceeded the dietary target for sodium intake.

Research conducted on people with overweight conditions found that meal kit delivery programs, in addition to health/nutrition education resulted in a significant positive intake of fruits and vegetables, though body composition and macronutrient had slightly to no change.

== Meal kit user experience ==
Meal kit subscribers are mostly young (Gen-X and Millennials), overwhelmingly urban, and skew male and upper-income. As reported by meal kit users, the main reasons for use are to save time planning/shopping and minimize overall waste with portioned ingredients. Meal kits may improve food literacy skills, by introducing customers to nutritional guidelines and portion sizes with well balanced recipes.
