= Justine Kelly =

American chef

Justine Kelly is a chef in the San Francisco Bay Area. She has appeared on Iron Chef America, served as the chef de cuisine at the Slanted Door, and is currently the master chef for Sun Basket.

== Career ==
Kelly's career took off at the Red Cat when Charles Phan noticed her in 1996. Phan hired her as the pastry chef at the Slanted Door restaurant, which has been featured in Gourmet magazine. In 2007, she took over as chef de cuisine. Kelly has also been the executive chef at Rooftop and the consulting chef at Port Costa's Bull Valley Roadhouse. Kelly's appearance on Iron Chef America with Phan in a Season 7 episode focused on several recipes with almonds. Kelly is now the executive chef at Sun Basket.
