= Business Growth Fund =

British investment company

BGF
- Business Growth Fund (BGF) logo
- Formerly: Business Growth Fund
- Industry: Private equity
- Founded: 2011; 15 years ago
- Founders: Barclays, HSBC, Lloyds Bank, Royal Bank of Scotland and Standard Chartered bank
- Key people: Andy Gregory
- Total assets: £4.5bn
- Number of employees: 180 (2021)
- Website: www.bgf.co.uk

BGF, established in 2011 as the Business Growth Fund, is a leading European mid-market private equity and investment firm that provides scaleup support for small and mid-sized businesses. The firm is recognised as The United Kingdom and Ireland's most active growth equity investor.

From a network of 15 offices in the UK and Ireland, the company has invested more than £5.5 billion in more than 650 small and mid-sized companies, and completed more than 200 exits. Around three-quarters of its investments have been in companies based outside London and South East England.

== History ==
BGF was founded in 2011 by Barclays, HSBC, Lloyds Bank, Royal Bank of Scotland and Standard Chartered banks, after the 2008 financial crisis.

The launch followed lobbying of both Conservative and Labour politicians by businessman Sir Nigel Rudd, who had argued for the creation of an organisation to provide equity funding to help close a perceived funding gap for small and mid-sized businesses. A shortfall in funding for small and mid-sized businesses in the UK had been identified as long ago as 1931 by the Macmillan Committee.

BGF was seen as a successor to the Industrial and Commercial Finance Corporation (ICFC), set up by the Bank of England in 1945 and subsequently renamed 3i. BGF has been described as the “modern 3i”.

Stephen Welton, founding CEO, said that a new organisation was needed because 3i’s business model, in line with the private equity industry generally, had evolved to focus on large buyout deals, meaning it had less of a focus on providing growth capital to small and mid-sized businesses.

In 2017, BGF opened an office in Dublin to administer a €250 million fund to invest in small and mid-sized Irish companies. The Irish fund is backed by AIB, Bank of Ireland, Ulster Bank, the Ireland Strategic Investment Fund and BGF’s existing shareholders.

BGF’s model has been replicated in Canada with the Canadian Business Growth Fund, launched in 2018 and backed by financial institutions including Royal Bank of Canada, Toronto-Dominion Bank and Manulife. In 2019, the Australian Business Growth Fund was launched with backing from banks including Commonwealth Bank, Westpac, National Australia Bank and ANZ Bank.

== Leadership ==
Andy Gregory is Chief Executive Officer of BGF and a member of the company’s Board. A founding member of BGF’s management team, Gregory became CEO in 2022, having previously served as Chief Investment Officer. With over 30 years of experience in private equity, his career has included senior roles at Livingbridge, Bridgepoint and Royal Bank Development Capital. Gregory also sits on the Board of the Invest in Women Taskforce and NatWest’s Mid Market Council, and is Chair of the BGF Foundation, BGF's independent charitable arm, which supports initiatives that improve the lives of young people across the UK.

He took over as CEO from Stephen Welton, formerly of JP Morgan & Co, who led BGF since its inception in 2011. In 2013, Welton was appointed as an advisor to the UK Government, regarding the establishment of the British Business Bank and, in 2017, served as a member of the Industry Panel advising HM Treasury on the Patient Capital Review. He was also a member of the Prime Minister’s 2021 Business Council and member of the Innovate Council 2018-2021. In 2023, Welton was appointed Non-Executive Chair of the British Business Bank, after stepping down from BGF's Board.

== Investment approach ==
BGF is a growth capital investor, providing funding and support, in exchange for minority equity stakes in growing companies. It makes initial investments between £3 million and £30 million, with the possibility for follow-on investments.

The firm provides patient capital, which has been defined by HM Treasury as “long-term investment in innovative firms led by ambitious entrepreneurs who want to build large-scale businesses”.

BGF invests in a range of companies, including deep tech and life sciences startups, private growth businesses and small cap quoted companies, across every region and major sector of the economy.

BGF has been recognised as the most active growth capital investor in the UK and Ireland, deploying £2.3 billion between 2020 and 2024. In 2025, it announced its commitment to invest more than £3 billion in UK businesses over the next five years, including at least £300 million to female-powered businesses via the Invest in Women Taskforce.

BGF is also a certified B Corporation, a member of the Diversity VC Standard, and a signatory of the UN Principles for Responsible Investment and the Investing in Women Code.

== Notable investments ==
- Gymbox received investments of £39 million ($55 million) from BGF, resulting in a roughly doubled EBITDA and the opening of new locations in almost every part of London.
- Gousto, the recipe delivery firm, first received funding from BGF in 2015. Gousto became a unicorn in 2020 when it completed a funding round valuing the business at more than $1 billion.
- Brompton Bicycle secured a multi-million pound investment from BGF to value the British iconic bike manufacturer at £200 million and accelerate growth, international expansion, and enhance balance sheets.
- Blue Light Card, the UK-based discount service for emergency services, NHS, social care, and armed forces staff, was scaled by BGF to 5 million members and 18,000+ brand partners, and brought the product to Australia. BGF successfully exited this investment to Inflexion.
- Social video advertising platform Unruly received financing from BGF in a funding round announced in 2012. The business was acquired by News Corp for £58 million in 2015.
- M Squared, which develops lasers and photonic optical instruments, received funding from BGF in 2012. BGF exited the majority of its shareholding in the company in 2020 when the Scottish National Investment Bank became a shareholder.

== The growth economy ==
The historian Sir Anthony Seldon has described the market segment of small and mid-sized companies in which BGF seeks to invest as “the growth economy”. Research by PwC found there were 21,400 growth economy companies in the UK in 2018, defined as fast-growing businesses that report turnover of between £2.5-100 million.

BGF provides an alternative source of funding for these companies, which have traditionally relied on bank loans to finance growth.
