= Sunbasket =

American meal kit company

Sun Basket, Inc.
- Company type: Private
- Founded: April 2014; 12 years ago
- Headquarters: San Francisco, California, U.S.
- Area served: United States
- Founders: Justine Kelly, Adam Zbar
- Key people: Don Barnett (CEO); Justine Kelly (Executive Chef)
- Industry: Meal kit
- Employees: 338 (2019)
- Website: sunbasket.com

Sunbasket is a subscription meal delivery service that ships members fresh, sometimes organic, and sustainable ingredients and recipes every week, allowing them to cook their own meals. The company is headquartered in San Francisco, and operates two regional distribution centers in Morgan Hill, CA and Westampton, New Jersey. It is part of the meal kit industry.

== History ==
Sunbasket was founded in 2014 by San Francisco chef Justine Kelly, former Chef de Cuisine at the Slanted Door, tech entrepreneur Adam Zbar, Tyler MacNiven, the 2006 winner of The Amazing Race and the company's head of user experience, and George Nachtrieb. Kelly appeared on Iron Chef America, and had been cooking in San Francisco for 25 years. Tyler Florence, a celebrity chef, is one of its board members.

By May 2015, the company was serving customers in eight states.

In May 2016, the company raised $11.62M in series A funding, led by PivotNorth Capital, Baseline Ventures, Vulcan Capital Management, Tyler Florence Group and several others. and in July, the company raised $15 million in series B funding. By July, the company had expanded its operations by opening an East Coast distribution center, and announced plans to open a third. The company grew from 10 employees from its 2014 launch to 400 in July 2016.

In February 2017, the company announced a $15 million Series C funding round led by Sapphire Ventures and several others. In May, the company announced a Series C-2 round, led by Unilever Ventures, the venture capital arm of food giant Unilever. The funding was earmarked to increase its coverage area by opening a distribution center in the Midwest, to go along with its two existing centers on the West and East Coast.

In January 2018, the company secured a $57.9 million series D and debt segment funding round, and also announced an expansion with two new distribution centers in the Midwest and East Coast. In March, the company opened a 190,000 sq. ft distribution center in New Jersey. In May, the company announced it was working with the American Diabetes Association to introduce diabetes-friendly recipes. In October, the company's meals received the American Heart Association's Heart-Check certification. In November, the company announced that it was working with the American Cancer Society to create meals that met that organization's health guidelines.

In May 2019, Sunbasket raised $30 million in Series E funding, including an investment from Unilever Ventures. In August, the company announced it was closing its St. Louis, Missouri distribution center.

In December 2021, Sunbasket merged with Prüvit Ventures, a keto supplement maker, in an all-stock deal, with Sunbasket and Prüvit becoming wholly owned subsidiaries of PSB Holdings, a new holding company.

== Service ==
The company serves customers who have strict dietary restrictions, offering paleo, gluten-free and vegetarian options, among others. It is one of the few meal kit companies that is USDA - Certified Organic. The ingredients are sourced from California farms.

== Sustainability ==
In response to industry concerns about wasteful packaging in meal kits, the company set a goal to produce zero-waste packaging and developed recyclable insulation liners using recyclable PET fiber; ice packs made from GMO cotton and water; and fully compostable ingredient bags.

== Controversy ==
In 2017, Sunbasket faced a complaint that it provided non-organic meats and produce in meals which were marketed as organic. An anonymous complaint filed through the Electronic Retailing Self-Regulation Program claimed that, despite the company's advertising implying that all meal ingredients were organic and non-GMO, only some of its produce and none of its meat were organic. This claim was in-line with complaints found on sites such as Yelp that Sunbasket's advertising was deceptive.

Sunbasket modified its advertising, removing mentions of organic produce from some of its marketing messaging and changing the description of its meals from "organic" to "organic and sustainable". The ESRP found these changes to be insufficient to inform consumers that Sunbasket includes organic produce when possible, but not all produce is organic. In response, when an item of organic produce is unavailable, Sunbasket will attempt to provide an organic substitute. If a substitute is not available, it will provide a conventionally grown fruit or vegetable along with a note informing the consumer of the substitution.
