= Tovala =

Meal delivery service and oven manufacturer

- Founded: 2015; 11 years ago
- Headquarters: Chicago, Illinois, U.S.
- Area served: United States
- Founders: David Rabie; Bryan Wilcox
- Industry: Meal kit
- Employees: 375 (2024)
- Website: www.tovala.com

Tovala is a smart oven and meal delivery company based in Chicago, Illinois. It sells a series of smart ovens that combine baking, broiling, air frying, and steam cooking and which can be controlled by an app.

== History ==
Tovala was co-founded in 2015 by CEO David Rabie and CTO Bryan Wilcox. It won a venture challenge at the University of Chicago. Initially named Maestro and nicknamed the "Keurig for food," it launched with a Kickstarter in January 2016 that raised $256,000. That year, it was also accepted into the Y Combinator accelerator program.

Tovala launched to the general public in 2017. It also raised a $9.2 million Series A round that year, led by Origin Ventures, and acquired the Chicago-based food-delivery service Radish. In 2020, the company raised a $20 million Series B round of capital, led by Finistere Ventures and including Comcast Ventures, OurCrowd, Rich Products Ventures, Pritzker Group Venture Capital, and the University of Chicago. It added a $30 million Series C round in 2021, led by Left Lane Capital. As of 2024, it has raised a total of $68.6 million and employs about 375 people.

The company has released several generations of its countertop smart ovens, most recently the Tovala Smart Oven and the Tovala Smart Oven Pro, which includes steam cooking. They have ranged in price from $300 to $400, with substantial discounts for customers who also sign up for the company's meal-kit service.
