= Purple Carrot =

Meal kit company

- Company type: Subsidiary
- Industry: Meal kits
- Founded: July 2014
- Founder: Andy Levitt
- Headquarters: Needham, Massachusetts
- Area served: United States
- Key people: Rishi Bhatia, CEO
- Services: Meal delivery service
- Revenue: $43 million (2018)
- Number of employees: 70+
- Parent: Oisix ra daichi Inc.
- Website: www.purplecarrot.com

Purple Carrot is a Needham, Massachusetts-based, and 100% plant-based meal kit company. Founded by Andy Levitt, it offers both prepared meals as well as meal kits to subscribers weekly. As stated in a 2022 article in Cosmopolitan, “each Purple Carrot meal kit results in 72% less carbon being released into the atmosphere as compared to the standard American meal.”

Purple Carrot was acquired by the Japanese meal-kit service Oisix ra daichi Inc. in May 2019 for $12.8 million. Its CEO is Rishi Bhatia.

== About ==
When founded in 2014, Purple Carrot was the first all-plant-based meal kit service in the United States, coining the slogan the "New American Diet".

Consumers can choose between two different packages: either a three-night meal plan which serves two people ($68) or a two-night meal plan that serves four ($74). The meal preparation times vary, depending on the particular meals being cooked, but are claimed to fall within the 30-minute range. Mark Bittman, its chief innovation officer in 2015, says they can take up to 60 minutes, depending on the skill of the cook.

Purple Carrot was acquired by Japan's largest meal-kit and organic food delivery service, Oisix ra daichi Inc., in May 2019 for $12.8 million.

In May 2022, Rishi Bhatia was appointed the new CEO of the company. Previously he was the chief technology officer at Purple Carrot. Bhatia stated in an interview with Modern Retail, "We want to continue to deliver unique flavors, but also increase our value proposition through convenience and flexibility, as cooking habits evolve."

In July 2023, Purple Carrot was awarded a Blue Ribbon by PETA by not obtaining coconut milk from Thailand, following reports of Thai coconut companies kidnapping monkeys and forcing them to act as "coconut-picking machines".

== See also ==
- Delivery Hero
- Marley Spoon
- Postmates
- OrderUp
