= Adam Zbar =

American entrepreneur

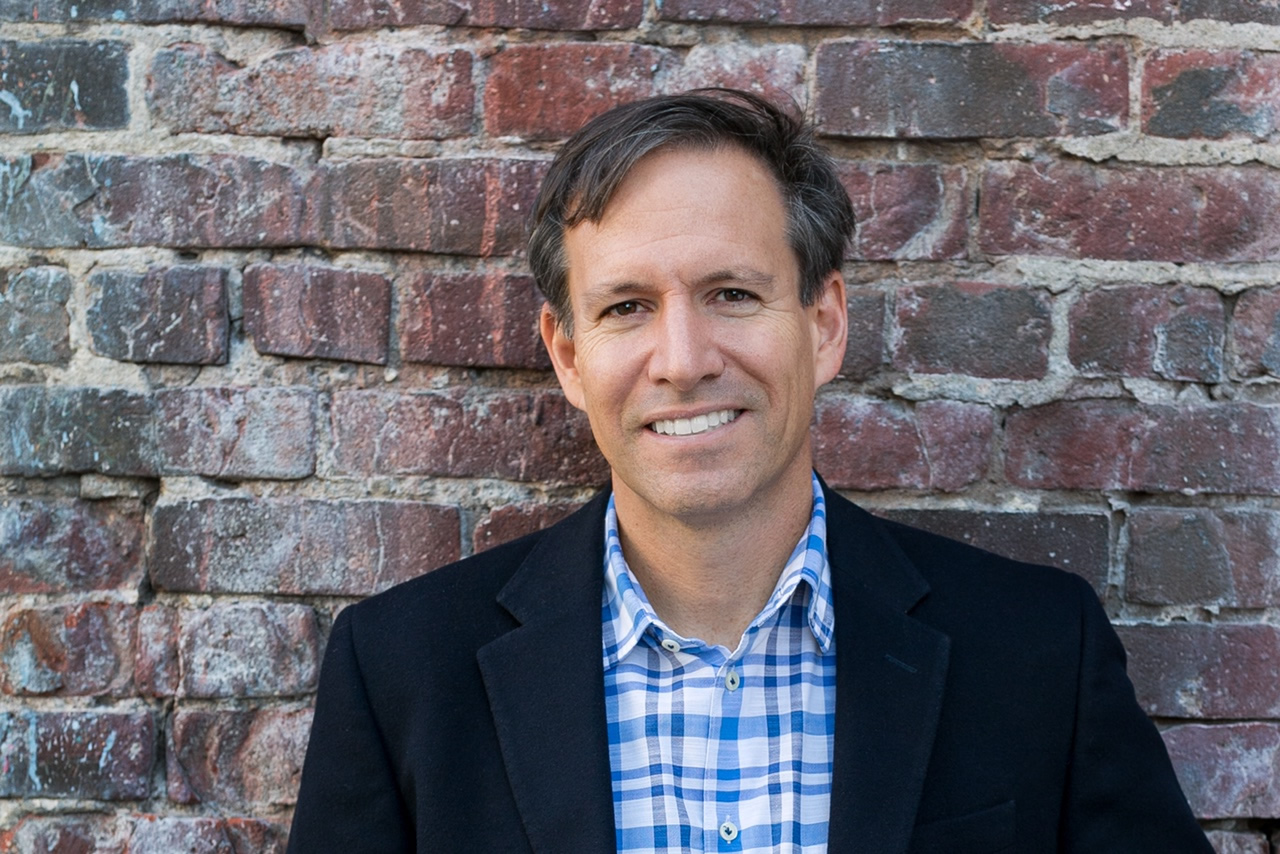
- Born: October 15, 1969 (age 57); Washington, DC
- Education: Pomona College; UCLA School of Theater, Film and Television
- Occupations: CEO of global clearing and settlement platform for central banks and financial institutions Hamsa, Entrepreneur
- Known for: CEO of Hamsa, Former CEO of Sun Basket, Founder and former CEO of Tap11, Former CEO of Zannel, Founder and former CEO of Lasso

Adam Zbar is an American entrepreneur and the CEO of Hamsa, a global clearing and settlement platform for central banks and financial institutions using Hamsa’s Unified Ledger. In 2025, Hamsa will clear $400B.

Zbar was the CEO of Sun Basket, a San Francisco-based e-commerce company, which grew to $275M in revenues and was sold in 2021 in a deal that valued the combined company at $1.3B. Previously, Zbar founded Lasso, Tap11, and Zannel. Tap11 and Zannel were sold to AVOS Systems, led by the founders of YouTube.

== Early life and education ==
Zbar was born in 1969 in Washington D.C. His father, Dr. Bert Zbar, is a cancer scientist at the National Cancer Institute, who along with Dr. Marston Linehan discovered 4 genes related to hereditary kidney cancer. His mother, Dr. Michell Lynn Arnow, was a psychologist. His grandfather, George C. Hatch, was an entrepreneur, communications, and cable pioneer, including co-founding Tele-Communications (TCI) which became a major cable television provider in the United States.

Zbar studied economics at Pomona College and received his MFA in Film Production from UCLA’s School of Theater, Film, & Television.

== Career ==
Zbar started his career in management consulting at McKinsey & Company in Los Angeles, where he worked from 1991 to 1993. He then worked as VP of Business Development at kpe, part of Agency.com, a digital media company based in Los Angeles, where his team built some of the early websites for Warner Home Video, Six Flags, and Mandalay Resort Group. In 2001, Zbar moved to Silicon Valley where he worked as a technology executive for post-bubble online and mobile companies. During this period, he ran a $100M online hotel booking business at WorldRes, and developed next generation mobile media applications at Moviso/Infospace.

=== Zannel ===
In 2005, Zbar along with co-founder Braxton Woodham, raised $6M in venture capital from US Venture Partners (USVP) for his first start-up, Zannel. Zannel was a real-time, multi-media microblogging platform which won a Webby in 2008 for best mobile social network. In 2008, Zbar raised $10M for Zannel’s Series B.

=== Tap11 ===
In 2009, Adam Zbar along with Braxton Woodham launched their second company, Tap11, a real-time Twitter business analytics platform. Tap11 was the first social analytics firm to store and index Twitter's then 140 million tweets per day. In 2011, Zbar sold both Tap11 and Zannel to AVOS Systems, led by the founders of YouTube, Chad Hurley and Steve Chen.

=== Lasso ===
In 2012, Zbar raised $1.7M in seed funding from Baseline Ventures and Pivot North Capital, and in 2013 launched Lasso, a same day on-demand wine and cheese food delivery service.

=== Sun Basket ===
Later in 2014, Zbar realized that a healthy food delivery service was a much bigger market than wine delivery, and he pivoted the business to become Sun Basket, which ships organic and sustainable ingredients and recipes to customers, allowing them to make their own meals. The company launched in beta in March 2015.

Zbar led several funding rounds for the company, including one by food giant Unilever's venture capital arm, Unilever Ventures. Sun Basket grew to $275M in revenues and was sold in 2021 in a deal that values the combined company at $1.3B.

=== Hamsa ===
Zbar founded Hamsa in 2020. The company is the creator of the Universal Confidential Ledger, which provides a standard programmable layer for global clearing and settlement for central banks and financial institutions. In 2025, Hamsa will clear $400B.

Hamsa has raised $27M as of 2025 and is backed by Greycroft, Haven, Valor, Quona, and other institutional and strategic investors.

== Books & films ==
Zbar is an author who has written 3 books. Shine is a memoir of Adam’s life. Infinite Power is a novel that takes place in Silicon Valley about the race for renewable energy. Gaze is a collection of short stories about modern life.

Zbar has made 2 feature films. The Divine Toad is set in Silicon Valley and is retelling of Dante’s Inferno. Mermaids and Manatees is a cautionary tale about the challenges of being a CEO in Silicon Valley. Zbar also made the short film When the Sea Turns To Lemonade.
