= How to Cook Everything =

General cooking reference

How To Cook Everything (John Wiley & Sons, 1998, ISBN 0-02-861010-5) is a general cooking reference written by New York Times food writer Mark Bittman and aimed at United States home cooks. It is the flagship volume of a series of books that include several narrow-subject books about matters such as convenience cooking and vegetarian cuisine, as well as a second volume, How To Cook Everything: Vegetarian, published in 2007, and a second edition with a reduced emphasis on professional techniques in October 2008. A smartphone app for iPhone, iPad, and Windows supports that second book by making all its recipes available portably.

When the 20th anniversary edition of How To Cook Everything was published in 2019, Bittman was interviewed by Yewande Komolafe in New York to celebrate the publication of this edition of the cookbook.
