= Education in Berlin =

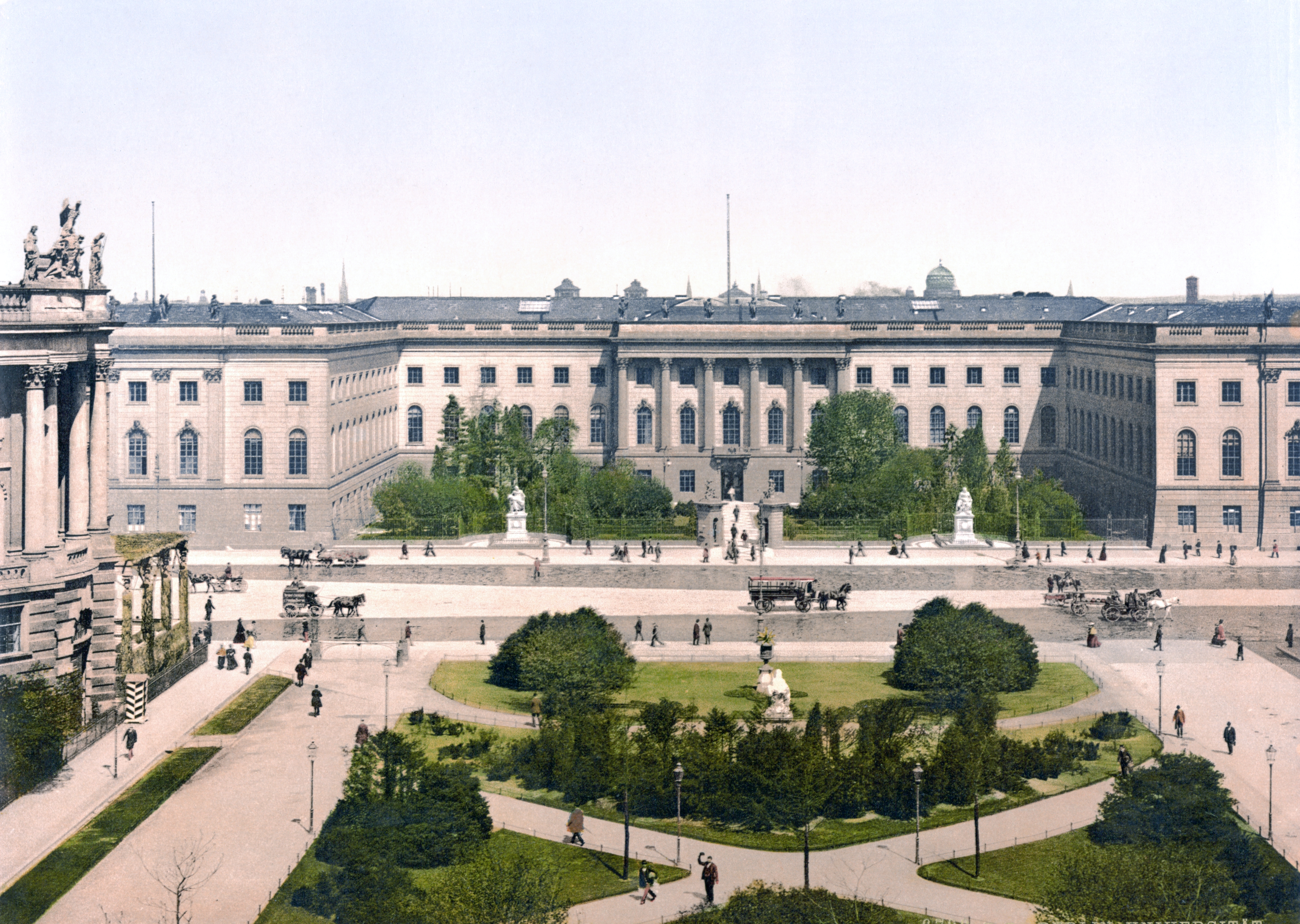
Humboldt University, founded in Berlin in 1810, was a much emulated model of a modern university in the 19th century (photochrom from 1900).

Education in Berlin covers the whole spectrum from nurseries, kindergarten, primary education, secondary education, apprenticeships, higher education, adult education and research in Berlin. The German states are primarily responsible for the educational system in Germany.

== Kindergarten ==
In Berlin, like in Germany, preschool education is the domain of the Kindertagesstätte (literally "children's day site", often shortened to Kita or KITA), which is usually divided into the Kinderkrippe (crèche) for toddlers (age up to 3 years), and the Kindergarten for children who are older than three years and before school. Children in their last Kindergarten year may be grouped into a Vorschule ("preschool") and given special pedagogic attention.

== Primary education ==
The State of Berlin has a six-year primary education program.

== Secondary education ==
Before 2011 completing primary school, students progressed to one of the four types of secondary schools for up to six further years: Hauptschule, Realschule, Gymnasium, or Gesamtschule. Since 2011/12, there are only two types of schools:

- The Sekundarschule: The Senate of Berlin decided that Hauptschulen, Realschulen and Gesamtschulen should be merged to become the new Sekundarschule. The Sekundarschule will be a comprehensive school and serve students from a wide range of abilities. Depending how well they did in school, students graduating from a Sekundarschule will receive the Hauptschulabschluss, the Realschulabschluss or the Abitur. Class size for the Sekundarschule will be 25 students.
- The Gymnasium (college preparatory school). It was ruled that Berlin's Gymnasien should no longer be allowed to handpick all of their students. It was ruled that while they should be able to pick 65% to 70% of their students, the other places at the Gymnasien are to be allocated by lottery. All children are able to enter the lottery, regardless of their performance in primary school. It was hoped that this policy will increase the number of working class students attending a Gymnasium. Class size for the Gymnasium will be 32 students.

Since the school year 2006/2007, the abitur in German, mathematics and foreign languages has been marked centrally in Berlin, and five examinations have to be taken instead of four. Students starting in grade 7 in that year or later complete the abitur after twelve years.

=== Schools ===
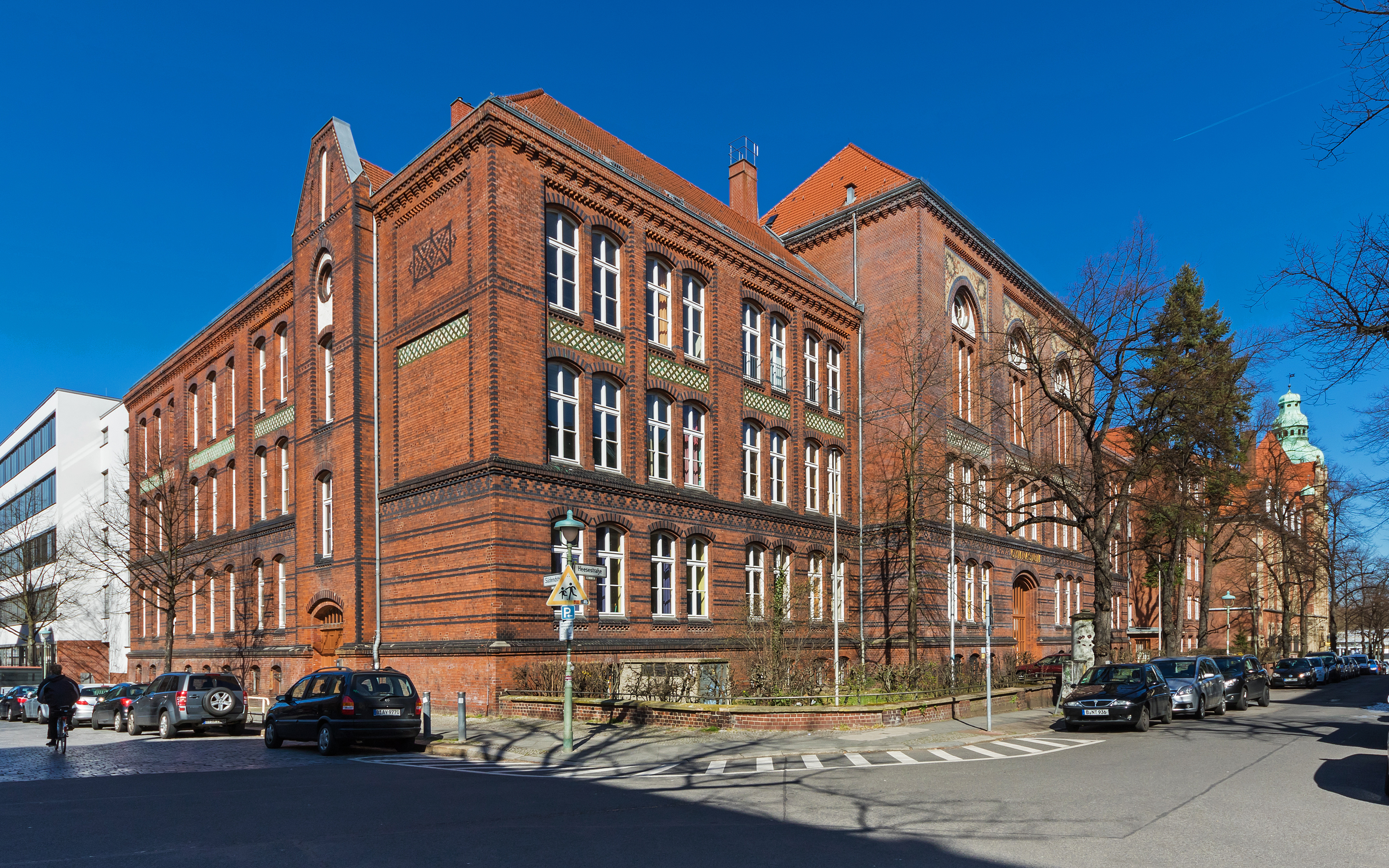
Gymnasium Steglitz in Berlin

In 2007 Berlin had 878 schools that taught 340,658 children in 13,727 classes and 56,787 trainees in businesses and elsewhere. The city has a six-year primary education program. After completing primary school, students progress to the Sekundarschule (a comprehensive school) or Gymnasium (college preparatory school).

Berlin has a special bilingual school program embedded in the "Europaschule". At participating schools, children are taught the curriculum in German and also in a foreign language, starting in primary school and continuing in high school. Throughout nearly all boroughs, nine major European languages can be chosen as foreign languages in 29 schools.

Notable schools in Berlin include:

- Französisches Gymnasium Berlin, Gymnasium
- Canisius-Kolleg Berlin, Gymnasium
- Evangelisches Gymnasium zum Grauen Kloster, Gymnasium
- John F. Kennedy School, Berlin, primary and secondary school
- Oberschule am Elsengrund, Gymnasium
- Nelson Mandela School, secondary school
- International School Villa Amalienhof, primary and secondary school

== Tertiary education ==
=== Universities ===
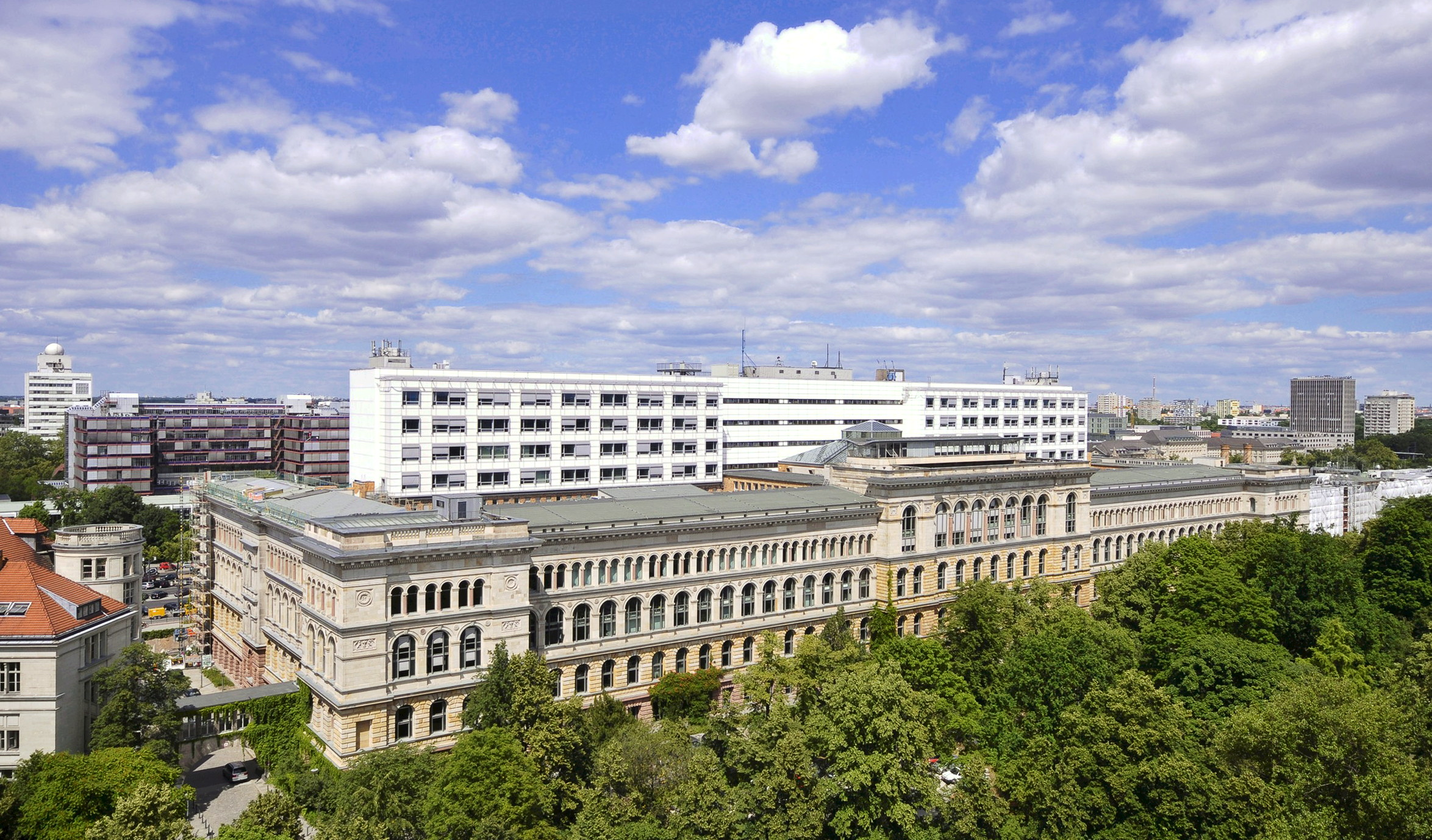
Main building of TU Berlin, one of the largest technical universities in Germany

The city has four universities and numerous private, professional and technical colleges (Hochschulen or Fachhochschulen), offering students a wide range of disciplines.

Around 175,000 students, among them 20% international students, attend the universities and professional or technical colleges. Student enrollment has grown constantly over the last 10 years. The three largest universities account for around 100,000 students. These are the Humboldt Universität zu Berlin with 35,000 students, the Freie Universität Berlin (Free University of Berlin) with around 35,000 students, and the Technische Universität Berlin with 30,000 students. The Universität der Künste has about 4,000 students.

== See also ==
- Education in Germany
- List of modern universities in Europe (1801–1945)
