= Cook it =

Canadian meal kit service

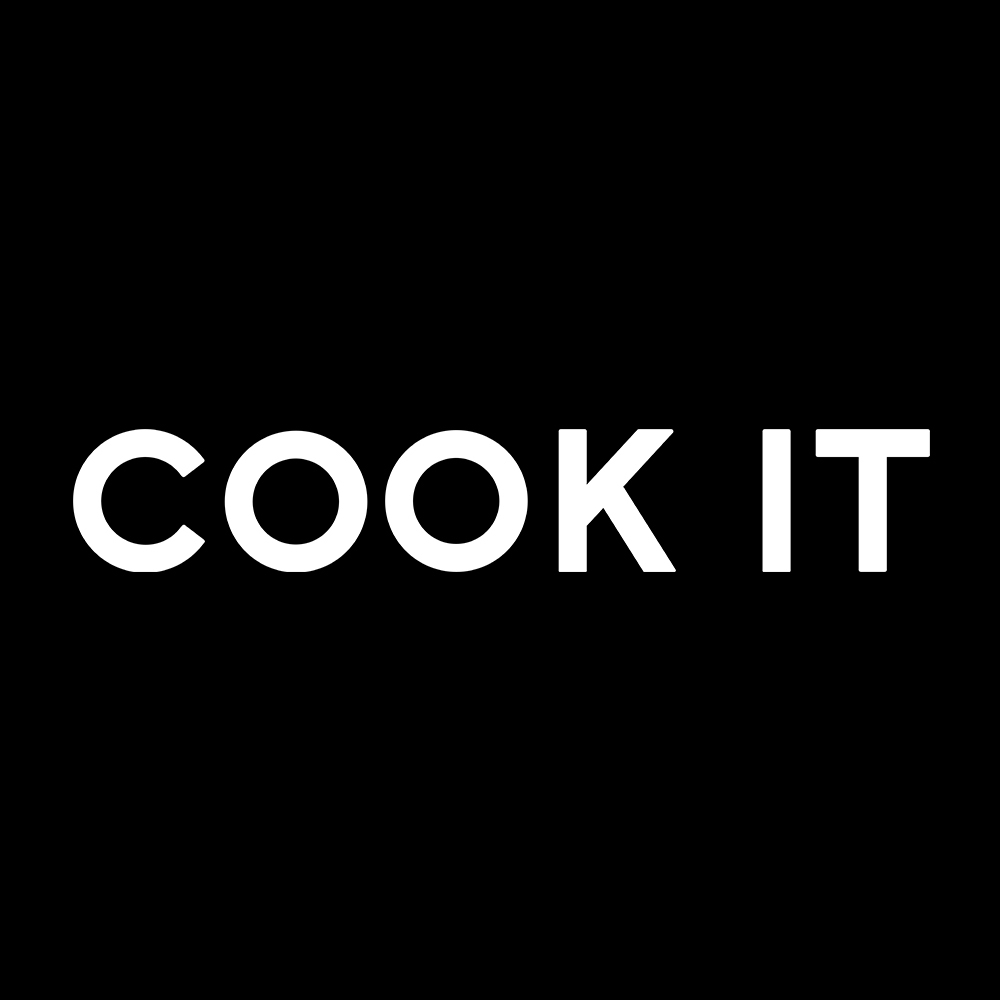
- Founded: 2014
- Founder: Judith Fetzer Patrick Chamberland Thomas Dubrana
- Defunct: 2024
- Fate: Acquired by Fresh Prep Foods
- Headquarters: Montréal, Quebec, Canada
- Number of employees: 450

Cook it was a Canadian meal kit service available in Quebec, Ontario and the Maritime Provinces of Canada. Based in Montreal, it was the first meal kit company established in Canada. Cook it's subscription service entailed the delivery of boxes containing ingredient bags and recipe cards for breakfasts and dinners, as well as ready-to-eat meals and products including beverages, snacks, and lunch items.

In December 2019, Cook it acquired the competing company Missfresh, which led to an increase of 30,000 subscribers to its service. Cook it underwent a wave of hirings and had more than 500 employees. In May 2020, Cook it surpassed the status of a small and medium-sized enterprise (SME).

In February 2024, Fresh Prep Foods acquired Cook it.

== History ==
=== Founding ===
Cook it was founded by Judith Fetzer, Patrick Chamberland and Thomas Dubrana in 2014. It was then the first meal kit company in Canada. Since its creation, the company's stated mission has focused on families and the idea of simplifying meal preparation for parents and young professionals.

In June 2014, Judith and Patrick presented the company on the show Dans l'oeil du dragon, the Québécois version of Dragon’s Den.

In 2016, Judith Fetzer presented once again Cook it on television, this time on the Canadian version of Dragon's Den. This time, she received offers from four “dragons” (investors), and concluded a partnership with Arlene Dickinson. In the same year, the registration of Judith Fetzer in the Adopte Inc. program, dedicated to supporting young entrepreneurs, led to her "adoption" by Alain Bouchard, who then became a mentor for Cook it’s development.

=== Acquisitions ===
In April 2017, 5 months after the arrival of Alain Bouchard as a mentor for the company, Cook it acquired Kuisto, a competing company, and merged its activities. Cook it made a second competing business acquisition on December 9, 2019, with the purchase of MissFresh from the Metro supermarket chain. This operation doubled the size of Cook it, which thereafter had 260 employees and 30,000 subscribers to its services.

=== Diversification and growth ===
In 2017, Cook it launched the first of its three À table avec Cook it magazines. In 2018, the company added a “pantry” shop to its offer, offering its customers the possibility to add various complementary food products to their box, such as snacks, lunch items and ready-to-eat meals.

In November 2018, Cook it launched its “Sustainable Kit” as a pilot project, with the stated aim of making its service more eco-friendly and reducing packaging and waste. The sustainable Cook it Kit, then available in certain areas of Montreal, was delivered by bicycle with a cooler bag and reusable containers reclaimed with the next delivery.

In April 2020, Cook it expanded its meal offer with “Brunch” recipes, breakfasts suitable for different times of the day. This novelty followed the craze of Canadians for lunches, which the company observed with its “pantry” shop sales.

In the spring of 2020, the containment situation linked to COVID-19 in Canada led to a high increase in sales as the result of being classified as an essential service and delivering food to homes. This rapid growth led to a massive hiring wave of around 200 new employees, Cook it thus expanded to more than 500 employees.

=== Acquisition ===
Cook it was acquired by Vancouver-based Fresh Prep Foods in February 2024.

== Awards and honours ==
Canadian Business Growth Awards / Female Entrepreneur of the Year Award
In November 2020, Judith Fetzer, co-founder and president of Cook it, won the Women Entrepreneur of the Year Award at the Canadian Business Growth Awards. The award showcases Canada's business leaders through a ranking based on five-year revenue growth.

RFAQ Prix Femmes d'Affaires du Québec / Entrepreneur of the Year, Large Company and Coup de coeur Desjardins COVID-19
On November 18, 2020, Judith Fetzer receives two awards from the RFAQ Prix Femmes d'Affaires du Québec highlighting the success of Cook it: Entrepreneur of the Year, Large Company and Coup de coeur Desjardins COVID-19. This second award is a recognition of "the exceptional way in which the entrepreneur who has completed more than 3 fiscal years by the file submission deadline has reinvented her business during the COVID-19 pandemic.
