= Gousto =

British meal kit retailer

SCA Investments Limited
- Trade name: Gousto
- Industry: Meal kit
- Founded: 12 April 2012
- Founder: Timo Boldt; James Carter
- Headquarters: London, England
- Area served: Most of mainland Great Britain, Northern Ireland, Republic of Ireland
- Number of employees: 900
- Website: www.gousto.co.uk

Gousto, a trading name of SCA Investments Limited, is a British meal kit retailer, headquartered in Shepherd's Bush, London, founded by Timo Boldt and James Carter. Gousto supplies subscribers with recipe kit boxes which include ready-measured, fresh ingredients and easily followed recipes.

== History ==
In August 2013, Gousto's co-founders appeared on the BBC's Dragons' Den.

In December 2015, Gousto raised £9m in funding from the Business Growth Fund, MMC Ventures, Unilever and the Angel Co-Fund, with a further £10m in November 2016.

In October 2016, Gousto's co-founder Timo Boldt was awarded IGD's 'Young Entrepreneur of the Year' award.

In January 2019, Gousto raised £18m in funding from Unilever Ventures, Hargreave Hale, MMC Ventures, the Angel CoFund, and fitness coach Joe Wicks.

In July 2019, Gousto raised £30m in funding from private equity firm Perwyn.

In February 2020, Gousto partnered with UK-based The Meatless Farm Company to build upon Gousto's objective of tapping into the growing audience of vegan and other consumers looking to reduce their meat consumption.

In April 2020, Gousto raised £33m in funding from Perwyn, BGF Ventures, and MMC Ventures, and Joe Wicks.

In November 2020, Gousto raised £25m in funding from existing backers Perwyn and BGF, implying a valuation of the company of over $1bn. In January 2022, Gousto secured $150m (£110m) in equity and debt financing from SoftBank Vision Fund 2, Barclays, and HSBC implying a valuation of the company of $1.7bn (£1.25bn).

When Gousto raised funds in February 2023, it did so at a valuation of less than £250m, representing a decrease of about 80% from its valuation of £1.4bn in 2022.

== Recognition ==
It has been voted best recipe kit service by The Independent, The Guardian, Metro and Time Out London.

== See also ==
- Online grocer
- Meal kit
