= Plated (meal kits) =

American meal kit service owned by Albertsons Companies, Inc

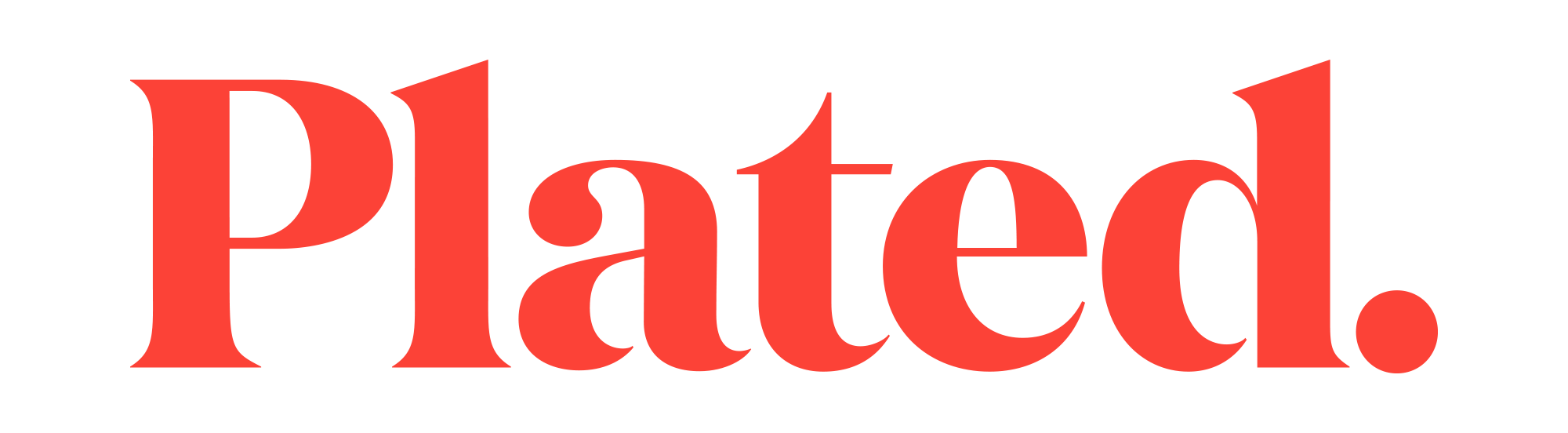
- Type: Subsidiary
- Industry: Meal kit
- Founded: 2012; 14 years ago
- Founder: Nick Taranto; Josh Hix
- Defunct: November 2019; 6 years ago
- Fate: Closed by Albertsons
- Headquarters: New York City
- Area served: United States
- Parent: Albertsons (2017–2019)
- Website: plated.com (redirects to safeway.com)

Plated was an American ingredient-and-recipe meal kit service that has been acquired by Albertsons. The company was founded in 2012 and became well known through its participation in Techstars in 2013, Shark Tank in 2014 and Beyond the Tank in 2015. Plated's founders, Nick Taranto and Josh Hix, earned a deal on Shark Tank that fell through, but negotiated a deal with a different Shark Tank investor after the show was filmed. The company accepted several rounds of venture capital investments and remained private until it was acquired by Albertsons in September 2017.

== History ==
Plated delivered meals in the form of weekly boxes that contained ingredients and recipes to be cooked by the customer. Founded by Harvard Business School classmates Nick Taranto and Josh Hix in 2012 and launched that November, the company was selected to be in the Spring 2013 Techstars NY class. It raised $1.4 million in seed round financing in May 2013 led by ff Venture Capital with angel investors that included TechStars, Manischewitz Company CEO Alain Bankier, Facebook's Andrew McCollom, and Paige Craig. The company surpassed 100,000 meals delivered in the northeast and midwest regions of the United States by July 2013 and sought series A financing to begin nationwide service.

That month, Plated appeared on episode 22 of the fifth season of Shark Tank, which aired on April 4, 2014; on the show, Plated struck a deal with Mark Cuban of $500,000 for 5.56% of the company. However, the deal never closed because Taranto and Hix, who had initially asked for a $500,000/4% deal on the show, wanted to renegotiate the deal based on growth after the show. Four months after the deal with Cuban fell through, the Plated founders made a deal with Shark Tank's Kevin O'Leary for an undisclosed sum.

In January 2014, Plated earned $5 million of Series A venture capital funding. The company raised an additional $15 million in funding in August 2014 of what was called new Series A funding from Venture Capital Dispatch. In the company's first three years, the company moved into sequentially larger fulfillment centers 14 times due to growth.

The company was featured in the second episode of the first season of Beyond the Tank, which aired on May 8, 2015. By the following month, the company was expected to surpass $100 million in revenue for the year. In July 2015, Plated raised $35 million in Series B funding. It extended its series B funding by $20 million in the third quarter of 2016.

== Acquisition ==
On September 20, 2017, Plated was acquired by Albertsons for $300 million. In April 2018, Albertsons began selling Plated meal kits in some of its stores. In November 2019, Albertsons announced it was ending Plated's subscription service with the last delivery date being November 27, 2019.
