= Mindful Chef =

British meal kit retailer

Mindful Chef Ltd.
- Industry: Meal kit
- Founded: 2015; 11 years ago
- Founders: Rob Grieg-Gran; Myles Hopper; Giles Humphries
- Headquarters: London, United Kingdom
- Area served: Most of mainland Britain
- Products: Meal kits
- Owner: Nestlé
- Number of employees: 100 (2020)
- Website: www.mindfulchef.com

Mindful Chef is a British meal kit retailer, headquartered in Battersea, London. It was founded by three friends: Rob Grieg-Gran, Myles Hopper, and Giles Humphries. Mindful Chef supplies subscribers with recipe kit boxes which include ready-measured, fresh ingredients and easily followed healthy recipes.

Set up in 2015 by three Devon school friends Giles, Myles and Rob, the brand's mission is to make healthy eating easy. Its recipe boxes and prepared food range provide people with everything needed to cook nutritionally-balanced meals, delivering across the UK.

Mindful Chef aims to encourage individuals to lead a healthier life by reducing the amount of processed food consumed and cutting out refined carbohydrates. They are the official nutrition partner of the English Institute of Sport and the British Heart Foundation to launch a new range of recipes that can help to support heart and circulatory health.

== History ==
The company was founded by three friends: Rob Grieg-Gran, Myles Hopper, and Giles Humphries in 2015. In April 2015, the first recipe boxes were hand delivered by the founders.

In July 2016, Mindful Chef received investments from Andy Murray and Victoria Pendleton as part of a £1million crowdfunding campaign. The following year in November 2018, Mindful Chef was certified as a B Corporation.

In January 2019, the private equity fund Piper invested £6million in the company to support rapid growth in the UK market. In November 2020 it was announced that Nestlé have bought the company.
