= Stephen Welton =

British businessman (born 1961)

Stephen Welton CBE

CEO of the Business Growth Fund
- In office 2011–2020

Personal details
- Born: Stephen Frank Welton; 9 February 1961 (age 65) Johannesburg, South Africa
- Education: Esher College; Durham University (LLB)
- Occupation: Business executive and investor

Stephen Frank Welton (9 February 1961) is a British business executive and investor who has served as non-executive chair of the British Business Bank since 2023.

He was the founding chief executive of the Business Growth Fund (BGF) from 2011 to 2020, before becoming executive chair and later non-executive chair.

== Early life and education ==
Welton was born in Johannesburg, South Africa and attended The Ridge School. He and his family moved back to England when he was 11 years old. His father was employed by the Parker Pen Company.

Welton attended Esher College. He graduated with a law degree from Durham University in 1983.

== Career ==
Welton initially trained as a barrister, before becoming a loan officer at the Bank of Boston. From 1986–90 he was senior vice-president at Security Pacific Eurofinance.

He co-founded Henderson Ventures and later joined Barclays Private Equity in 1995 as managing director. He left this role in 1999 to become chairman and CEO of TV Travel Shop. He subsequently became one of the founding partners of private equity firm CCMP Capital Advisors, JP Morgan's private equity arm.

=== Business Growth Fund ===
In 2011, Welton became the founding chief executive of the Business Growth Fund (BGF), a £2.5 billion investment company established by Barclays, HSBC, Lloyds Banking Group, the Royal Bank of Scotland and Standard Chartered to provide growth capital to small and medium-sized businesses in the UK. In 2021, Welton joined the Build Back Better Council, a Government business council launched by Boris Johnson to address the UK’s economic recovery from the COVID-19 pandemic.

By 2023, BGF had invested over £4 billion in more than 400 growth companies across the UK and Ireland. Welton became the investor's Executive Chairman in 2020 before stepping down in June 2023.

=== British Business Bank ===
In October 2023, Welton was appointed non-executive chair of the British Business Bank, succeeding Lord Smith of Kelvin. He had previously advised the UK government on the establishment of the bank in 2013 and served on the industry panel advising HM Treasury on its Patient Capital Review in 2017.

== Personal life ==
Welton is married, with three children.

== Honours ==
Welton was appointed Commander of the Order of the British Empire (CBE) in the 2023 Birthday Honours for services to small businesses and entrepreneurship.
