= GASAG =

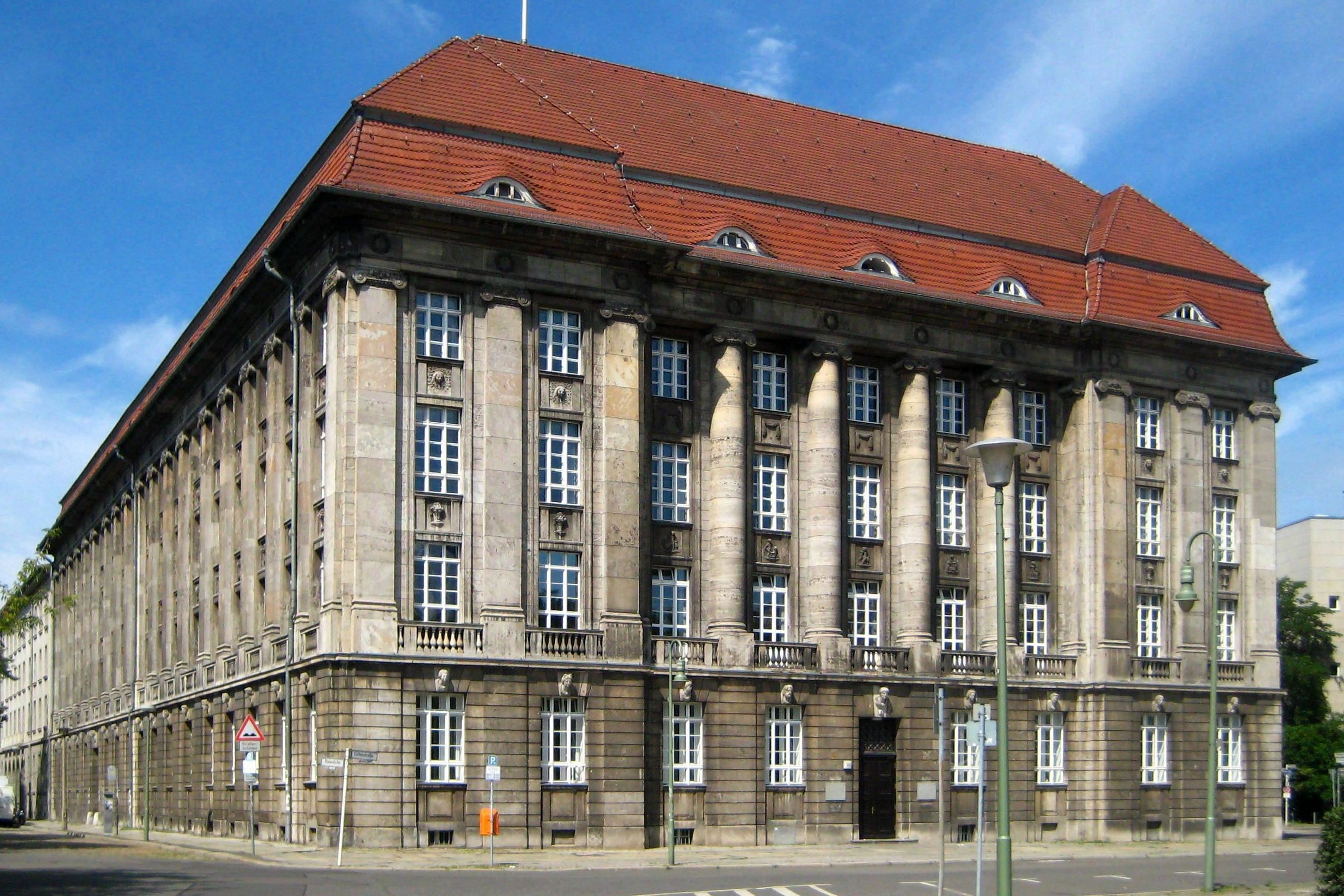
Former head office building of GASAG in Berlin

GASAG (German: Berliner Gaswerke Aktiengesellschaft; English: Berlin Gas Works Corporation) is the main natural gas supplier and vendor in Berlin, Germany.
