= Mark Bittman =

American journalist, food writer

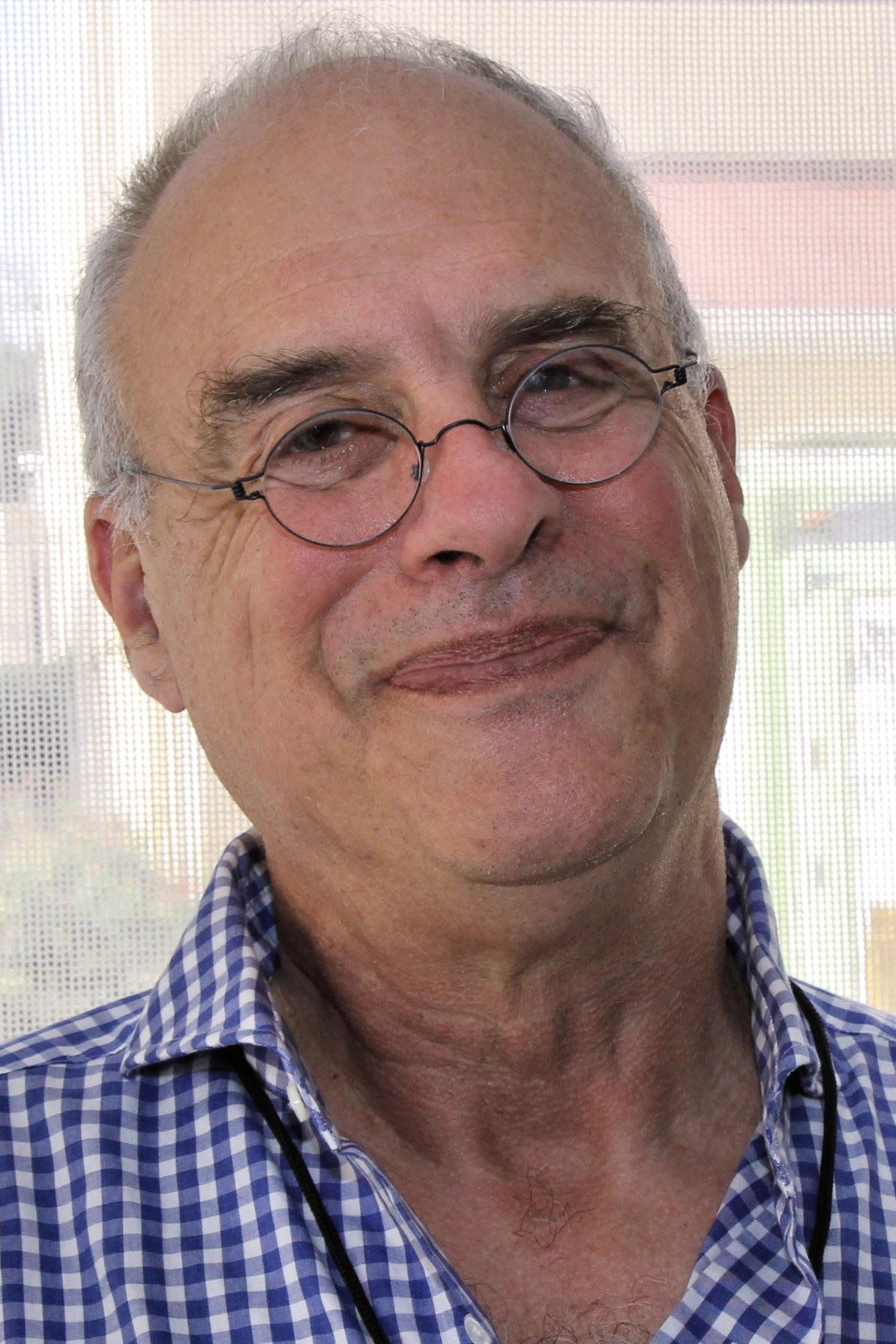
- Bittman at the 2017 Texas Book Festival
- Born: February 17, 1950 (age 76)
- Education: Clark University
- Occupations: Journalist, author
- Partner: Kathleen Finlay
- Children: 2
- Writing career
- Notable awards: Julia Child awards, James Beard awards

Mark Bittman (born February 17, 1950) is an American food journalist, author and former columnist for The New York Times. Bittman has promoted VB6 (vegan before 6:00), a flexitarian diet. He is the author of How to Cook Everything and How to Cook Everything Vegetarian.

== Career ==
Bittman is a journalist, food writer and the author of 30 books, including the bestselling How to Cook Everything and books in the same series (How to Cook Everything Vegetarian, How to Cook Everything - The Basics, etc.) and the NYT bestseller VB6: Eat Vegan Before 6:00. He has been the recipient of numerous International Association of Culinary Professionals, Julia Child and James Beard awards for his writing.

Bittman was an Opinion columnist for The New York Times, a food columnist for the paper's Dining section and the lead food writer for The New York Times Magazine. His column, "The Minimalist," ran in The New York Times for more than 13 years; the final column was published on January 26, 2011. He also hosted a weekly "Minimalist" cooking video on the New York Times website.

Bittman is a regular guest on NBC's The Today Show and the NPR shows All Things Considered and Wait, Wait, Don't Tell Me. He appeared as a guest judge on the Food Network competition series Chopped and was featured alongside Gwyneth Paltrow and Mario Batali in the PBS series Spain... on the Road Again in 2008. In 2014, Bittman appeared as a correspondent for the climate change documentary series Years of Living Dangerously. He gave a TED talk, "What's wrong with what we eat".

In 2015, Bittman announced he would be leaving the New York Times to join Purple Carrot (which subsequently received press for its partnership with Tom Brady) as its chief innovation officer. Bittman spent less than a year with Purple Carrot.

In 2019, Bittman started a food magazine with Medium, Heated.

=== Books ===
Bittman has written and co-written 16 books and cookbooks. His most recent cookbook, How to Cook Everything Fast, was released October 7, 2014. In 2005 he published The Best Recipes in the World and Bittman Takes on America's Chefs, and hosted the Public Television series Bittman Takes on America's Chefs, which won the James Beard Award for best cooking series. In 2007 he published How to Cook Everything Vegetarian: Simple Meatless Recipes for Great Food, which was nominated for a James Beard in 2008.

In 2009 he published Food Matters, which covers food-related topics such as environmental challenges, lifestyle diseases, overproduction and over-consumption of meat and simple carbohydrates. He also began the TV series Kitchen Express. Bittman has written The Minimalist Cooks at Home, The Minimalist Cooks Dinner and The Minimalist Entertains. In 2010 Bittman created The Food Matters Cookbook, an expansion of the principles and recipes in his prior book. In 2021, he published Animal, Vegetable, Junk: A History of Food, from Sustainable to Suicidal, in which he argues that corporate farming contributes to the major public health and environmental issues in modern agriculture.

=== VB6 ===
Bittman has authored VB6: Eat Vegan Before 6:00 (2013) and The VB6 Cookbook (2014), where he recommends a flexitarian diet. The idea behind VB6 is to eat vegan food before 6pm and any food afterwards, while limiting processed foods all day. It was nominated for a James Beard Award (Focus on Health) in 2014.

The British Dietetic Association named the VB6 diet as one of the "Top 5 Worst Celebrity Diets to Avoid in 2015".

== Personal life ==
Bittman is a graduate of Stuyvesant High School (1967) and Clark University. He lived in Berkeley, California from 2015 to 2017 and has two adult daughters from a prior marriage.

Bittman runs marathons, is a licensed pilot, and now lives in Cold Spring, New York.

Bittman is Jewish, and his grandparents emigrated from Ukraine and Romania. He follows his VB6 diet.

== Quotations ==
Not only is a semi-vegan diet easier to sustain than a full vegan diet, there's no reason to be one hundred percent vegan. There's not really an argument for that except if you have an ethical argument. That's okay. That's fine. But there's not a health reason. There's not a practical reason. I think it's just a matter of eating more plants, not a matter of eating only plants. That is what I was thinking when I created VB6: that this was a more reasonable, more moderate way to do this for people—and hopefully more achievable. But it's not going to happen on a big scale until we teach kids how to eat right. It's hard to teach grownups. We all know that.

— Mark Bittman, in 2015
