= Oberschule am Elsengrund =

School in Berlin, Germany

Coordinates: 52°30′03″N 13°36′37″E

Oberschule am Elsengrund was a school in Mahlsdorf in Berlin, Germany. The school was founded in 1983 as a school for Polytechnique. After the reunification of Germany it became a comprehensive school. This school moved away in summer 1993 and in August of the same year it became a gymnasium (school) which is not existing anymore. It had about 750 students taught by around 50 teachers.

Foreign languages taught were English, French, Latin and Spanish.
