= Museum des Kapitalismus =

Museum in Berlin, Germany

Coordinates: 52°29′18.384″N 13°26′34.584″E

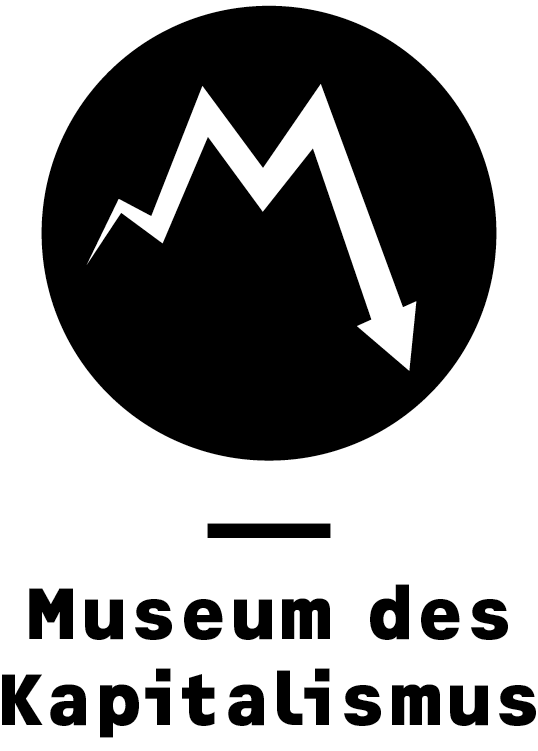
Logo of Museum des Kapitalismus

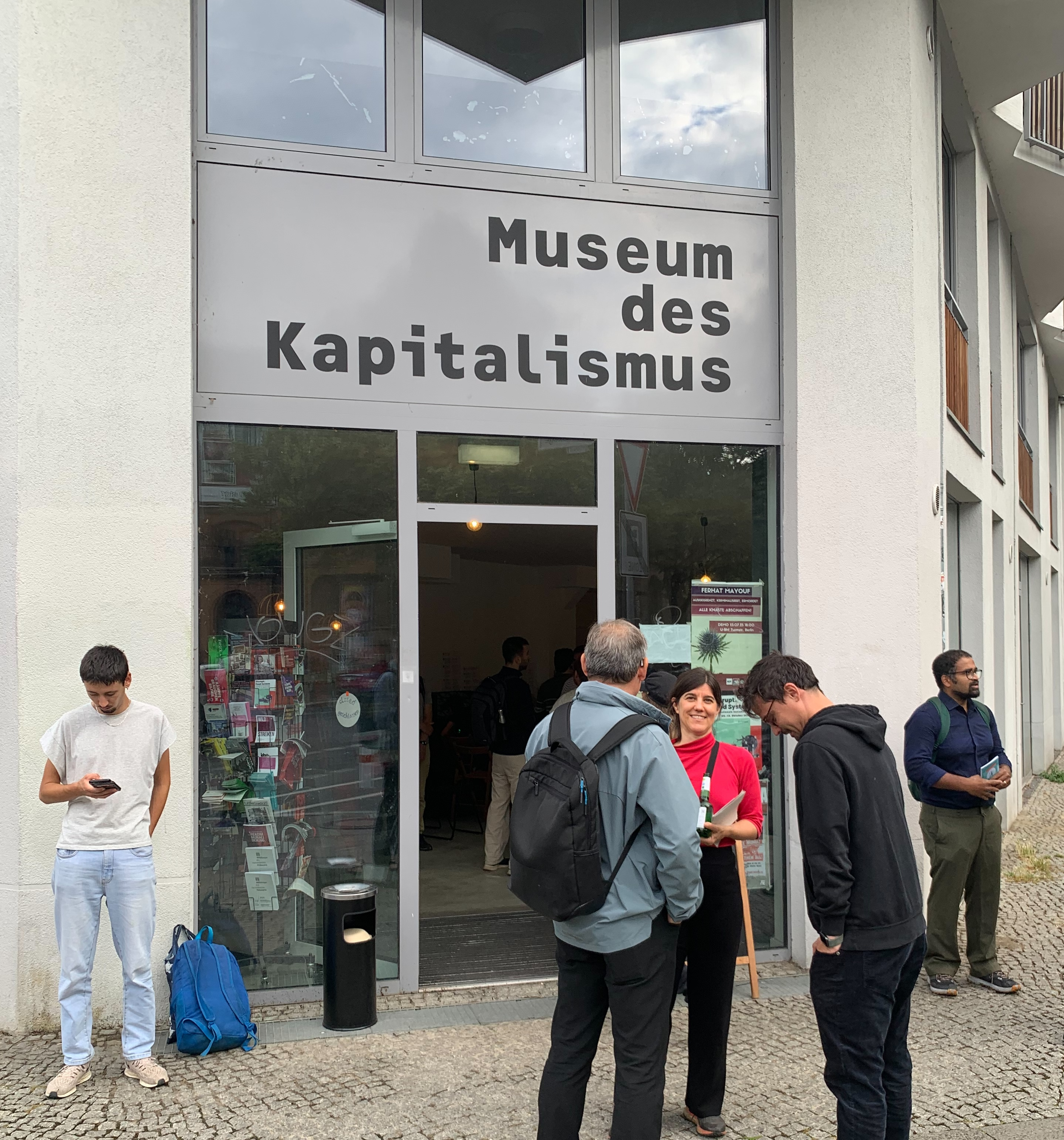
Museum des Kapitalismus, entrance at Köpenicker street 172, Berlin

Museum des Kapitalismus (Museum of Capitalism) is a museum Berlin's Köpenicker Straße 172 in Berlin-Kreuzberg district which deals with different aspects of capitalism.

== History ==
The first exhibition was opened on June 27, 2014. A second exhibition took place from July to November 2015. In 2017, the museum exhibited for a week in Hamburg-St. Pauli. The museum is run by the association Bildung und Partizipation e.V., which is funded by the Berlin-state's institution for political education.

== Contents ==
The museum attempts to explain aspects of capitalism in its exhibitions. Five exhibition rooms deal with needs and mechanisms of exclusion, crisis, colonialism and the beyond of capitalism. The museum seeks to establish an open space that is accessible to everyone. Interactive exhibits are also intended to make the content easy to understand and therefore accessible to everyone.
