= HelloFresh =

German meal kit provider

HelloFresh SE
- Type: Public (Societas Europaea)
- Traded as: FWB: HFG; MDAX component
- ISIN: DE000A161408; US42341P1049
- Industry: Food
- Founded: November 2011; 14 years ago
- Founders: Dominik Richter; Thomas Griesel; Jessica Nilsson
- Headquarters: Berlin, Germany
- Area served: Australia; Canada; New Zealand; United States; Western Europe
- Key people: Dominik Richter (CEO); Thomas Griesel (COO); Christian Gartner (CFO); Maximilian Backhaus (CMO)
- Products: Meal kits
- Revenue: ▼€6.76 billion (2025)
- Operating income: ▲ –€2 million (2025)
- Net income: ▲ –€92 million (2025)
- Total assets: ▼€2.08 billion (2025)
- Total equity: ▼€670 million (2025)
- Number of employees: 19,065 (2025)
- Website: hellofresh.com; hellofreshgroup.com

HelloFresh SE is a German multinational meal-kit company based in Berlin. Founded in 2011, it is one of the largest meal-kit providers in the world, operating in Australia, Canada, New Zealand, the United States, and Western Europe (Austria, Belgium, Denmark, France, Germany, Ireland, Luxembourg, Netherlands, Norway, Sweden, Switzerland, and the United Kingdom). Aside from its flagship brand, the company also owns and operates subsidiary brands such as Green Chef, EveryPlate and Factor.

HelloFresh has been listed on the Frankfurt Stock Exchange since its IPO in November 2017. At the end of 2022, the company had approximately 7.1 million active customers worldwide, including 3.4 million in the US, where it is the largest meal-kit provider.

== History ==
=== 2010s ===
HelloFresh was founded in November 2011 by Dominik Richter, Thomas Griesel, and Jessica Nilsson in Berlin. Richter and Griesel packed and hand-delivered to the first 10 customers. It was one of the earlier companies in the meal-kit industry. They were initially funded by Rocket Internet, a German startup studio company. They first started delivering meal kits to paying customers in early 2012, and expanded to The Netherlands, UK, US and Australia the same year. By 2014, the company claimed to be delivering 1 million meals per month. They raised $50 million in a 2014 funding round, after having raised $10 million in 2012, and $7 million in 2013.

By March 2015, the company had 250,000 subscribers, although it was still not profitable. In September of that year, it was valued at €2.6 billion in a funding round where it raised €75 million, making it a unicorn company. The company was still majority-owned by Rocket Internet at that time. It cancelled a planned IPO in November, due to concerns about the company's proposed value. It experienced significant growth during the year, with 530,000 subscribers by the end of October. It had 750,000 subscribers by July 2016, and 1.3 million by the third quarter of 2017.

In October 2017, the company announced a planned IPO on the Frankfurt Stock Exchange to raise $350 million. On 2 November, the company completed its IPO, valuing it at €1.7 billion. At the time of its IPO, the company had a market capitalization of more than double Blue Apron, its largest US-based competitor.

In March 2018, HelloFresh acquired Green Chef, a US organic meal-kit company. In October 2018, Toronto-based HelloFresh Canada acquired Chefs Plate, a Canadian meal-kit company.

In 2019, Rocket Internet sold its remaining stake in HelloFresh by accelerated book building to international institutional investors. Rocket Internet had held a 30.6% stake in HelloFresh, as of the end of 2018.

=== 2020s ===
In 2020, HelloFresh acquired ready-made meal company Factor75, LLC (doing business as Factor, Factor_, or Factor75) for up to $277 million. Factor75 was started in Batavia, Illinois, in 2013 by Mike Apostal and Nick Wernimont. At the time of the acquisition, it had grown to a $100 million company.

In July 2021, HelloFresh agreed to acquire the Brisbane-based food kit company Youfoodz from Lance Giles and Jordana Stott for A$125 million, with the transaction finalised in October 2021. Giles remained as CEO of Youfoodz during the transition period. According to The New Zealand Herald and The Australian, Giles also owned a 14.5% stake in Youfoodz, which amounted to a cashout of A$18 million. The couple subsequently used NZ$10 million from the sale of Youfoodz to bankroll the independent 2025 horror film Forgive Us All.

In April 2022 HelloFresh launched in Japan, the first Asian market for the meal box provider. Just 8 months later on 20 December 2022, HelloFresh announced their withdrawal from Japan with the CEO Thomas Griesel admitting failure in his ability to drive reasonable ROI. Employees were notified of their layoffs with less than the legal 30-day notice period. On 27 September 2023, HelloFresh filed for bankruptcy in the Tokyo District Court with total debt of 3 billion yen.

In November 2022, HelloFresh launched in Spain under the name HelloFresh SE, promising to use "100 percent Spanish raised beef, chicken and pork." The following year, they announced that they would cease importing coconut milk from Thailand, following an investigation by People for the Ethical Treatment of Animals which accused Thai farmers of forcing southern pig-tailed macaques to harvest coconuts.

HelloFresh announced in August 2023 they would expand their Factor ready-to-eat brand into Europe, starting with The Netherlands.

In January 2024, after an investigation begun in 2022, HelloFresh was fined £140,000 by the UK's Information Commissioner's Office (ICO), for sending millions of spam texts and emails, and contacting customers even after being asked to stop.

In March 2024, the company's stock dropped 46% in one day after the HelloFresh announced it expected lower earnings in 2024. HelloFresh then closed two distribution centers; in Nuneaton, Warwickshire in the UK and Newnan, Georgia in the US.

In early 2026, HelloFresh ceased its operations in Italy and Spain. The company stated that the two markets no longer offered a clear path to scale and sustainable profitability.

== Corporate affairs ==
The key trends of HelloFresh are (as at the financial year ending December 31):

Year	Revenue (€ bn)	Net income (€ m)	Employees
2017	0.9	–92	2,715
2018	1.2	–83	4,276
2019	1.8	–10	4,477
2020	3.7	369	6,432
2021	5.9	256	14,635
2022	7.6	127	19,595
2023	7.5	19	19,012
2024	7.7	–136	21,783
2025	6.8	–92	19,065

== Business ==
HelloFresh's business model is to prepare the ingredients needed for a meal, and deliver them to customers, who must then cook the meal using recipe cards, which can take around 30–50 minutes. It generally provides about three two-person meals a week for about $60 to $70. Each week, about 45 recipes are offered for users to choose from. In several markets, HelloFresh provides "Rapid Box" meals which take only 20 minutes to prepare. Their Factor brand competes in the ready-to-eat market, with not-frozen meals requiring about 2 minutes of preparation.

HelloFresh previously offered a wine-subscription service, based on that of its competitor Blue Apron. This subscription, HelloFresh Wine Club started at $14.83 per bottle or $89 for the whole month (includes 6 bottles of wine). With the Wine Club, customers could also pick between All Reds, All White, or a Mixed Box (Red and White) for their wine.

In March 2018, HelloFresh announced their acquisition of Green Chef, a USDA-certified organic meal-kit company. HelloFresh planned to use the acquisition to offer the largest selection of meal plans and diets for consumers on the market, adding Green Chef's organic vegan and gluten-free menus, including those plans compliant with Paleo and Keto diets. In 2020, HelloFresh acquired ready-made meal company Factor75 (since rebranded to just Factor) for $277 million. Factor was founded in 2013 and produces fresh pre-cooked meals with a focus on health and nutrition.

The company's US operations were responsible for 60% of revenues as of November 2017, and it has approximately 44% of the American market.

HelloFresh offers partnership opportunities, including in-store, affiliate, and corporate partnerships.

In March 2025, HelloFresh announced the closure of its distribution center in Grand Prairie, TX. This follows the 2024 closure of a distribution facility in the Atlanta area, part of the company’s cost-cutting program.

== International expansion ==
HelloFresh market entry timeline
Country	Year of entry
Germany	2011
United Kingdom	2012
Australia	2012
Netherlands	2012
Austria	2012
United States	2013
Belgium	2015
Canada	2016
Switzerland	2016
Luxembourg	2017
France	2018
New Zealand	2018
Sweden	2019
Denmark	2020
Norway	2021
Ireland	2022
Former operations
Italy	2021 (exited 2026)
Japan	2022 (exited 2022)
Spain	2022 (exited 2026)

== Union drives in the US ==
Warehouse workers for HelloFresh in Aurora, Colorado, and Richmond, California, initiated a union drive with UNITE-HERE in September 2021. HelloFresh management responded by hiring Kulture Consulting, a "union avoidance" consulting firm. Workers were compelled to attend captive audience meetings with anti-union messages. The Aurora election was held on 22 November, and Richmond held its election on 15 December; workers in both places voted decisively against unionization amid accusations of the company's interference and intimidation in the campaign, with the union contesting the results in Aurora. In Newark and Totowa, New Jersey, HelloFresh workers are unionizing with Brotherhood of Amalgamated Trades.

== Climate labeling ==
In November 2021, HelloFresh launched their Climate Labeling Initiative. This labeling is to let consumers know when recipes are producing up to 85% less CO_{2}e emissions. The initial launch was in Germany and expanded to ten other countries by late 2022.

== Labor violation allegations ==
From December 2024, the U.S. Department of Labor (DOL) has been investigating HelloFresh over allegations that migrant children were working at the meal-kit maker's cooking and packaging facility in Aurora, Illinois. The investigation also includes Midway Staffing, the agency responsible for hiring employees for the facility, to determine if child labor laws were violated. Cristobal Cavazos, executive director of Immigrant Solidarity, an immigrant rights advocacy group, stated that at least six teenagers, some of whom were migrants from Guatemala, were discovered working night shifts at the facility. The group played a role in bringing the issue to the attention of federal regulators.

In October 2024, a union representing 79 UK HelloFresh workers who had been recently dismissed called their terminations unjust and outrageous. Workers from the Warwickshire warehouse staged a protest after their dismissals, which the Community Trade Union claims occurred following complaints about poor working conditions, including restrictive toilet break policies and questionable termination procedures. Former workers have described the workplace environment as toxic, citing long waits for toilet access and alleging they were fired for raising concerns. Union leaders have vowed to appeal the dismissals and criticized HelloFresh for not fostering a supportive environment for employees to voice their issues.
