= Oktoberfest =

World's largest folk festival

Coordinates: 48°7′53″N 11°32′57″E

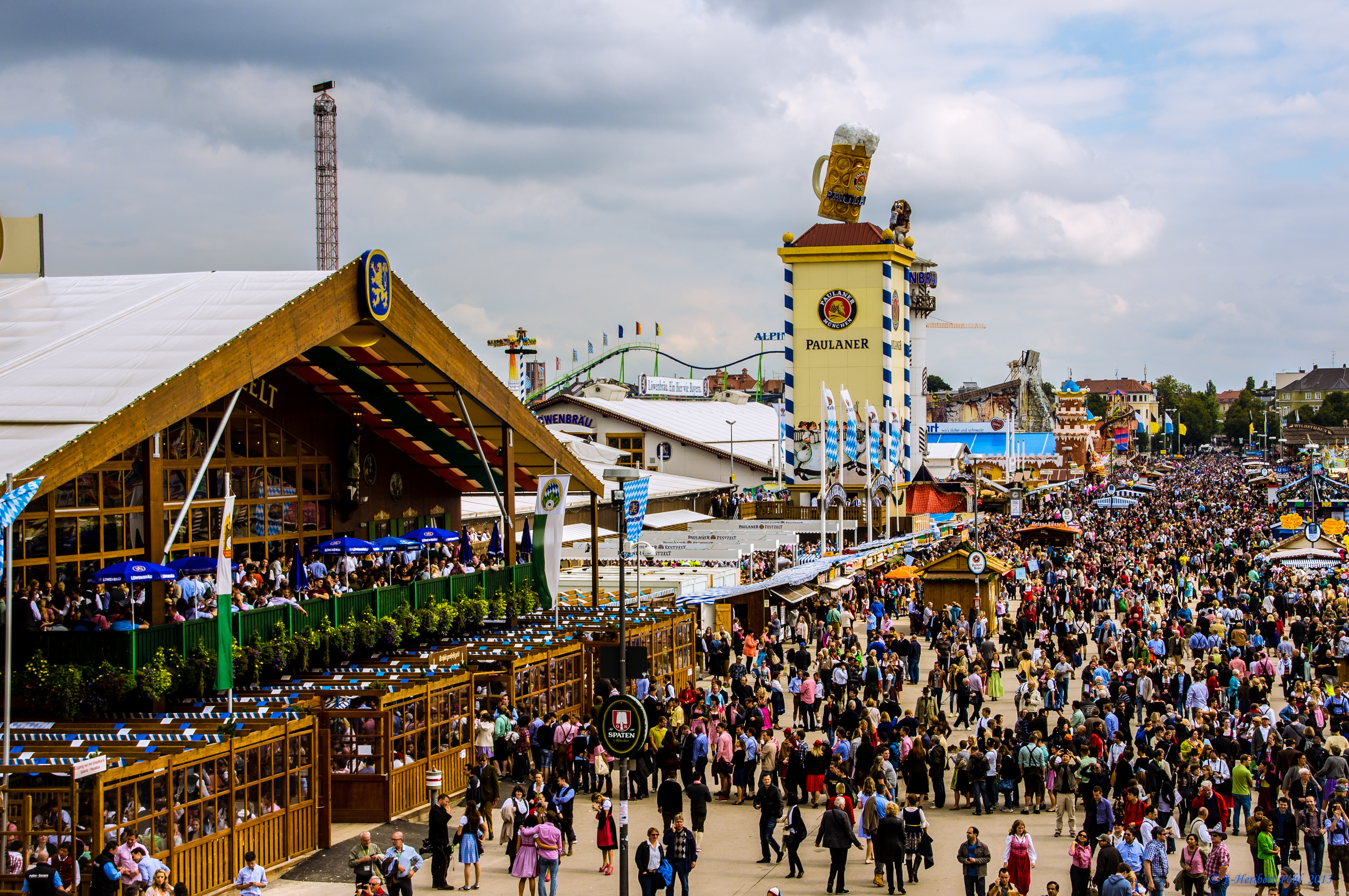
- Theresienwiese during the 2013 festival
- Observed by: Munich
- Type: Cultural
- Celebrations: Parades, music, Bavarian food and beer
- Date: September
- 2026 date: 19 September – 4 October
- 2027 date: 18 September – 3 October
- Duration: 16–18 days
- Frequency: Annual
- Related to: Oktoberfest celebrations

Oktoberfest logo

Oktoberfest (German pronunciation: [ɔkˈtoːbɐˌfɛst]; Bavarian: Oktobafest/d'Wiesn) is the world's largest Volksfest. It combines a beer festival with a fun fair and is held annually in Munich on the Theresienwiese from mid-September to the first Sunday in October.

The event draws around seven million visitors each year. In 2023, attendance reached a record 7.2 million. Visitors consumed approximately 7.4 million litres of beer. The festival features amusement rides, games, food stalls, and traditional Bavarian dishes.

The first Oktoberfest was held on 12 October 1810 to celebrate the wedding of Crown Prince Ludwig and Princess Therese of Saxony-Hildburghausen. The festival has been cancelled on multiple occasions, most recently in 2020 and 2021 during the COVID-19 pandemic in Germany.

== History ==
=== Origins (1810–1811) ===
On October 12, 1810, Crown Prince Ludwig of Bavaria married Princess Therese of Saxe-Hildburghausen. Munich officials invited the public to celebrate on fields outside the city walls. The site was named Theresienwiese ("Therese's Meadow") the following year and is still called Wiesn.

The first festival featured a horse race modelled on the medieval Scharlachrennen once run at the Karlstor. Major Andreas Michael Dall'Armi of the National Guard proposed the idea, although coachman Franz Baumgartner later claimed credit. The race was repeated in 1811, forming the core of the Oktoberfest tradition.

Sendlinger Hill—now Theresienhöhe—served as a natural grandstand for about 40,000 spectators. Sixteen pairs of children in regional costume opened the programme, thirty horses ran a 3,400 metres (11,200 ft) course, and a student choir closed the event. Baumgartner's horse won, and he received a gold medal from Minister of State Maximilian von Montgelas.

=== 19th century ===
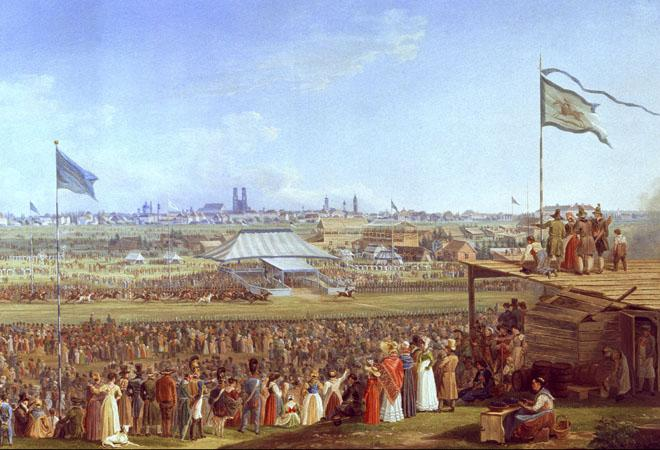
Horse race at the Oktoberfest, 1823

- 1811 – An agricultural show was added to promote Bavarian farming.
- 1813 – The fair was cancelled during the War of the Sixth Coalition.
- 1814 – Skittles, swings and climbing poles were introduced on its return.

Carnival booths appeared in 1818, offering prizes of silverware, porcelain and jewellery. Munich's city council assumed control in 1819 and decreed that Oktoberfest be held annually.

A Greek delegation that visited in 1832 later cited the festival as a model for the Zappas Olympics, precursors of the modern Olympic Games.

During the century the opening was moved into late September to take advantage of warmer evenings; only the final days now fall in October.

==== Parades and monuments ====
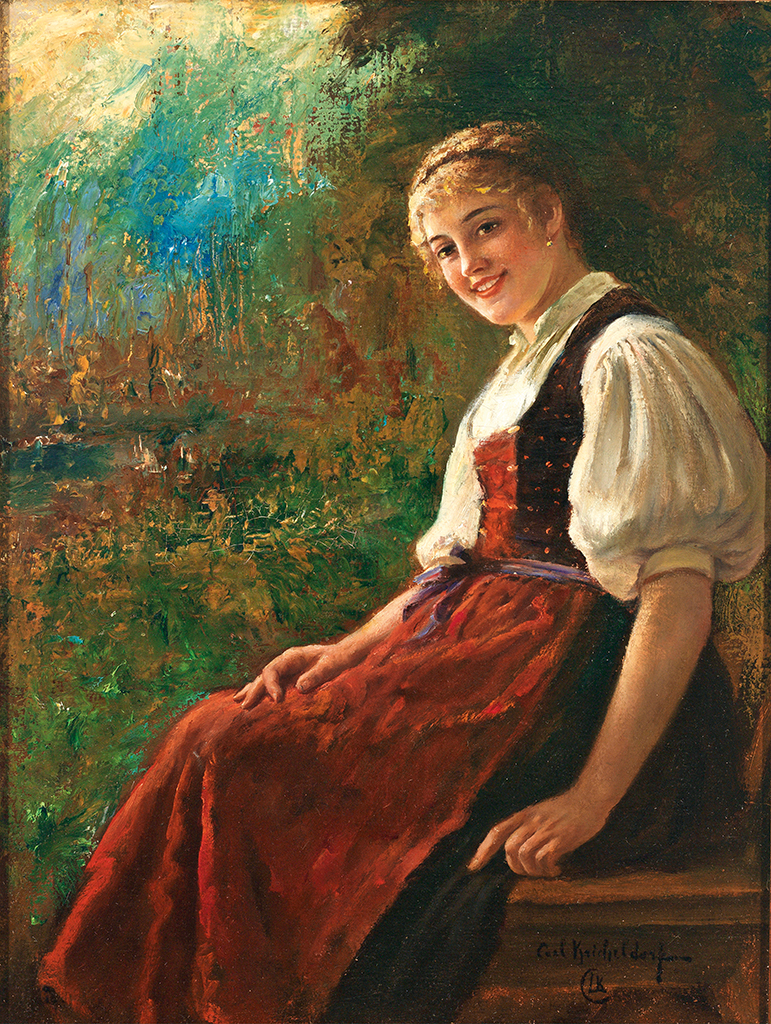
Girl in a Dirndl

Since 1850 the annual Trachten- und Schützenzug (costume and marksmen parade) has marched from Maximilianstraße to the Theresienwiese, with about 8,000 participants led by the Münchner Kindl mascot.

The bronze Bavaria statue, designed by Leo von Klenze and sculpted by Ludwig Michael Schwanthaler, was erected in 1850 in front of the Ruhmeshalle, which was completed in 1853.

==== Modernisation (1880–1900) ====
Oktoberfest was cancelled for cholera epidemics (1854, 1873), the Austro-Prussian War (1866) and the Franco-Prussian War (1870).

Year	Milestone
1880	Electric lighting illuminated more than 400 booths and tents.
1881	The first bratwurst stalls opened.
1887	A brewery-dray parade became part of the official opening.
1892	Beer began to be served in glass mugs.
c. 1900	Small booths were replaced by the large beer halls still used today.

=== 20th century ===
In 1910 the centenary celebration recorded the consumption of about 120,000 litres of beer. In 1913 the Bräurosl pavilion opened, seating roughly 12,000 guests.

==== Interruptions ====
- 1914–18 – Cancelled during World War I
- 1919–20 – Held only as a smaller Kleineres Herbstfest
- 1923–24 – Cancelled during hyperinflation

From 1933 to 1945 the Nazi regime used the festival for propaganda. In 1933 Jewish people were barred from working at the Wiesn. The festival was suspended 1939–45 during World War II; a modest "Autumn Fest" was held 1946–48.

Since 1950 the Mayor of Munich has opened Oktoberfest with a 12-gun salute and the cry "O'zapft is!" ("It's tapped!").

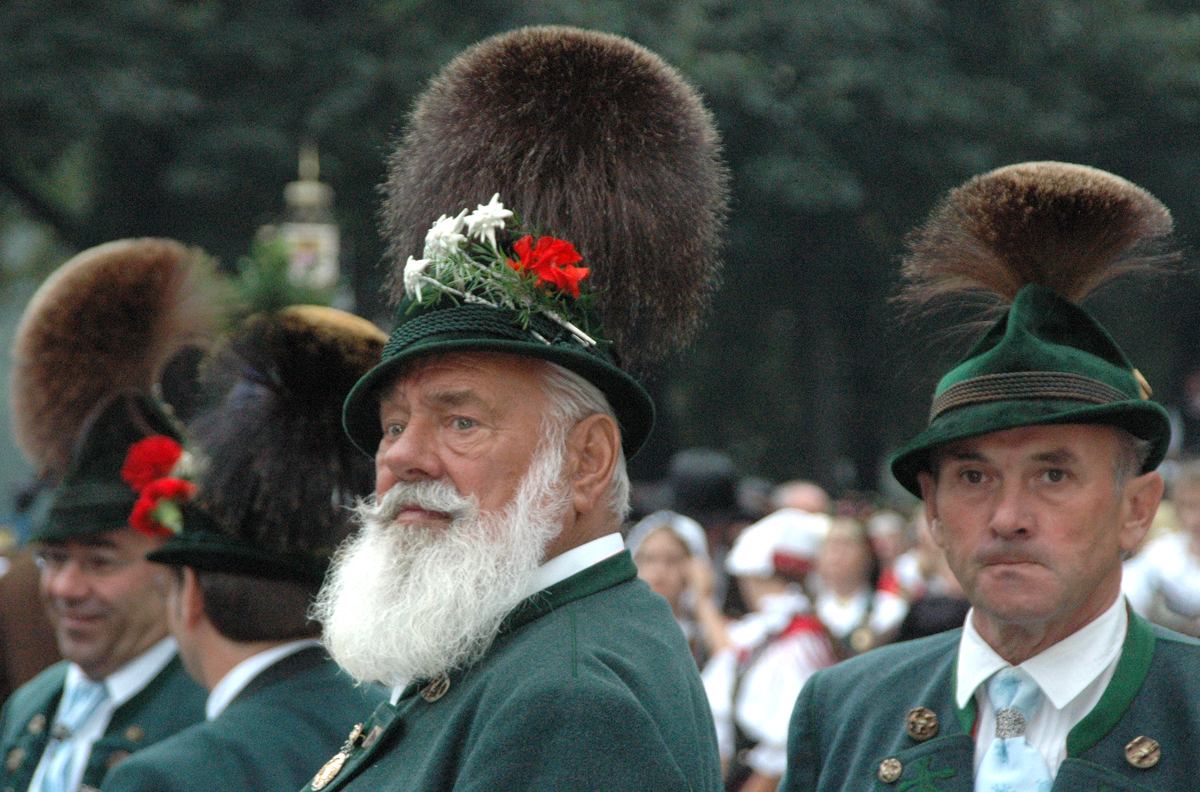
Gamsbärte at the restaurateurs' entry, 2008

==== 1980 bombing ====
On 26 September 1980 a pipe bomb exploded near the main entrance, killing 13 people and injuring more than 225. It was the second-deadliest terrorist attack in Germany.

=== 21st century ===
In 2005 organisers introduced a "quiet Oktoberfest": tents played only traditional brass music until 18:00, with afternoon volume capped at 85 dB.

A Bavarian smoking ban, fully enforced from 2011, made the festival smoke-free.

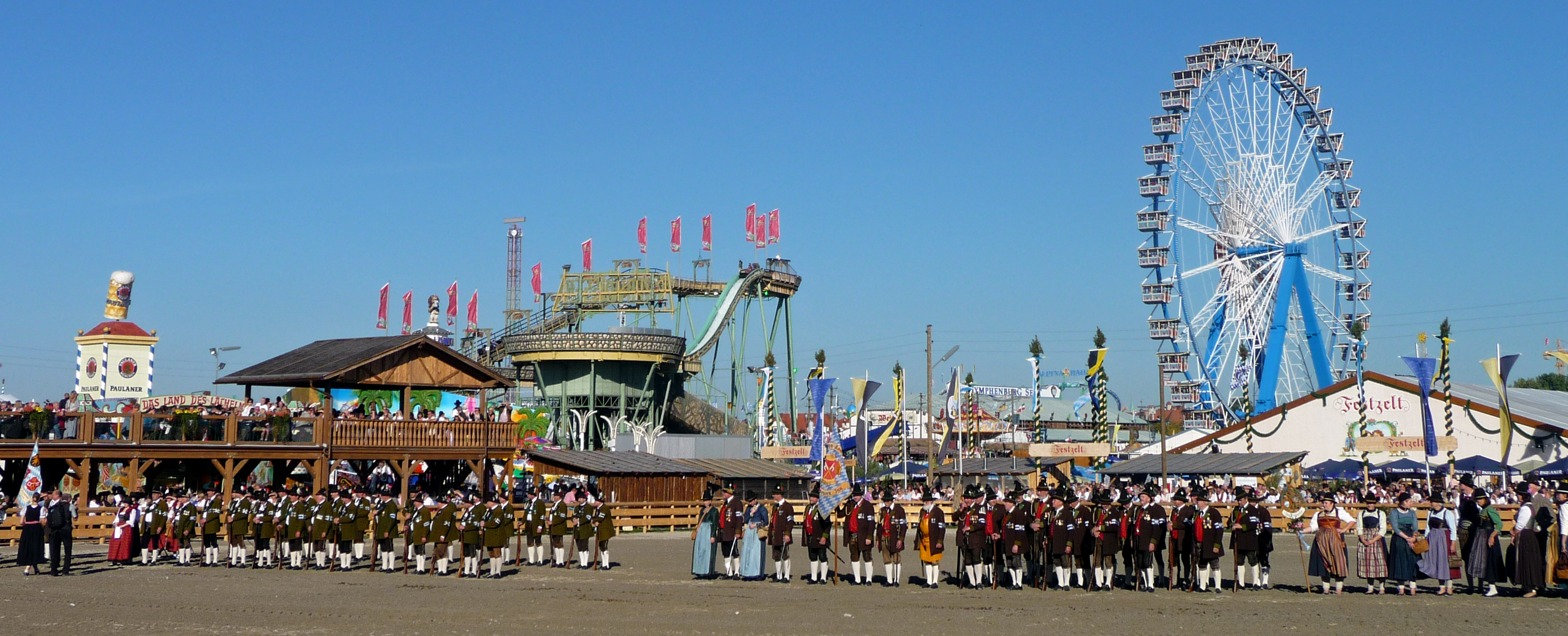
Celebrating 200 years of Oktoberfest, 2010

The 200th anniversary in 2010 included a historische Wiesn with a museum tent, special beer and a costumed horse race.

Attendance in 2013 reached 6.4 million, with 6.7 million litres of beer served.

The 2020 and 2021 festivals were cancelled because of the COVID-19 pandemic in Germany.

On 1 October 2025, the festival was temporarily shut down because of an explosion in an area of Munich.

== Annual traditions ==
=== Opening parade ===
The tradition of the Oktoberfest entry parade began in 1887, when Hans Steyrer, then a festival host, marched from his establishment on Tegernseer Landstraße to the Theresienwiese with his staff, a brass band, and a cart of beer.

In its current form, the parade has been held since 1935, when all participating breweries took part for the first time. Since 1950, the procession has been led by the Münchner Kindl, followed by the incumbent Mayor of Munich riding in the Schottenhammel family carriage. The parade also features decorated horse-drawn wagons and floats from the breweries, as well as carriages representing other restaurateurs and showpeople. Music bands from the beer tents accompany the procession.

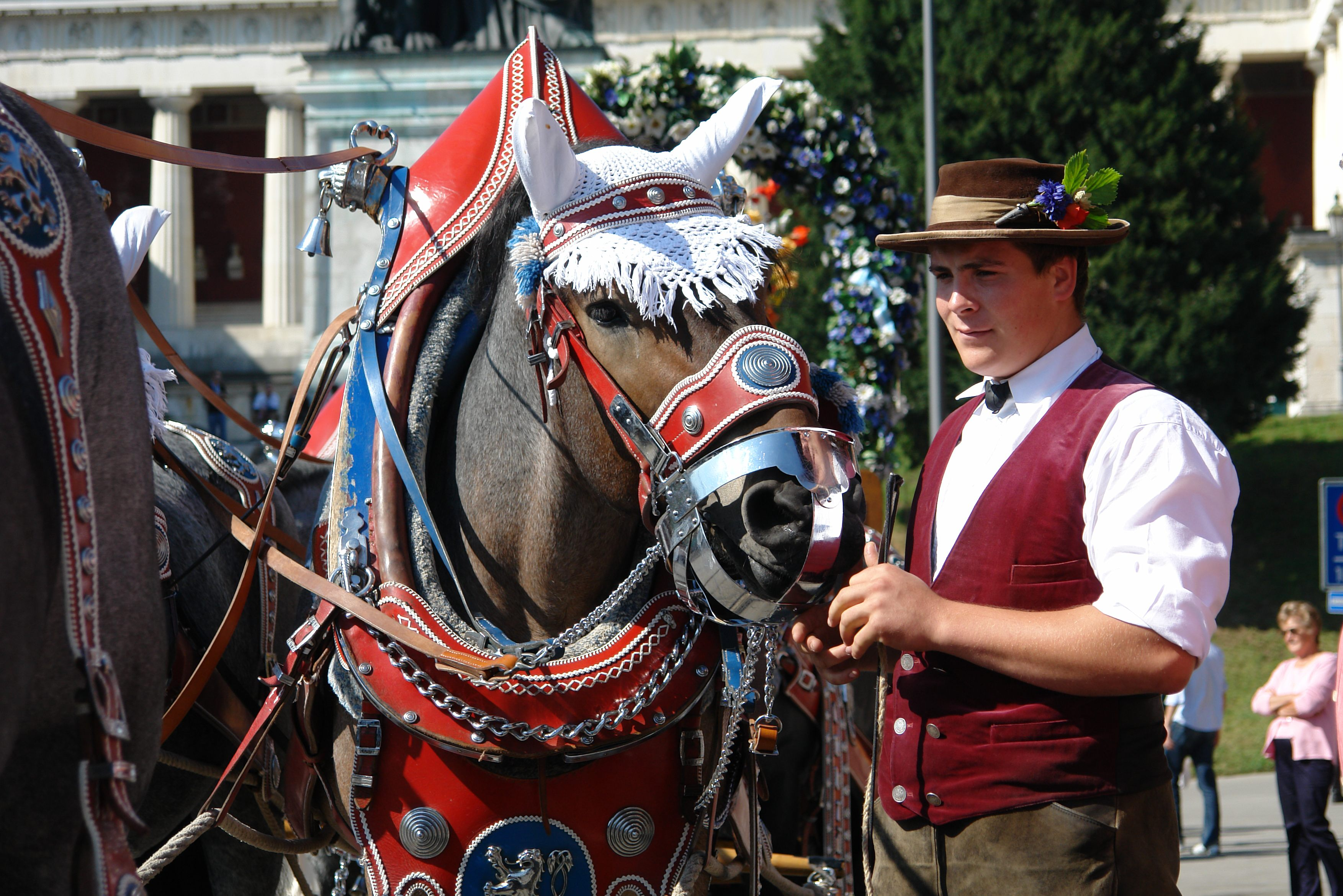
Coachmen in costume

=== Official opening ceremony ===
Following the parade, the official opening of Oktoberfest takes place at exactly 12:00 p.m. in the Schottenhammel tent. The Mayor of Munich taps the first keg of beer and announces the Bavarian phrase "O'zapft is!" (Es ist angezapft – "It is tapped!"). This marks the official start of the festival.

Twelve gunshots are then fired on the stairway of Ruhmeshalle. This is the signal for the other restaurateurs to start with the serving of beer. Traditionally, the Bavarian Minister-President is served the first litre of beer. Then in the other tents, the first barrels are tapped and beer is served to the visitors.

Every year, visitors see how many strokes the mayor needs to use before the first beer flows. Bets are even made. The best performance is still two strokes (Christian Ude, 2005, 2008, 2009, 2010, 2011, 2012 and 2013; Dieter Reiter, 2015, 2016, 2017, 2018 and 2019), and there was also 19 strokes required. (Thomas Wimmer, 1950).

=== Traditional Costume and riflemen parade ===
The first traditional costume parade was held in 1835 to mark the silver wedding anniversary of King Ludwig I of Bavaria and Princess Therese. A second parade followed in 1895, organised by the Bavarian novelist Maximilian Schmidt and involving about 1,400 participants in 150 costume groups. A further parade was held during the centenary celebrations in 1910, directed by Julius and Moritz Wallach, early promoters of the Dirndl and Lederhosen as everyday fashion.

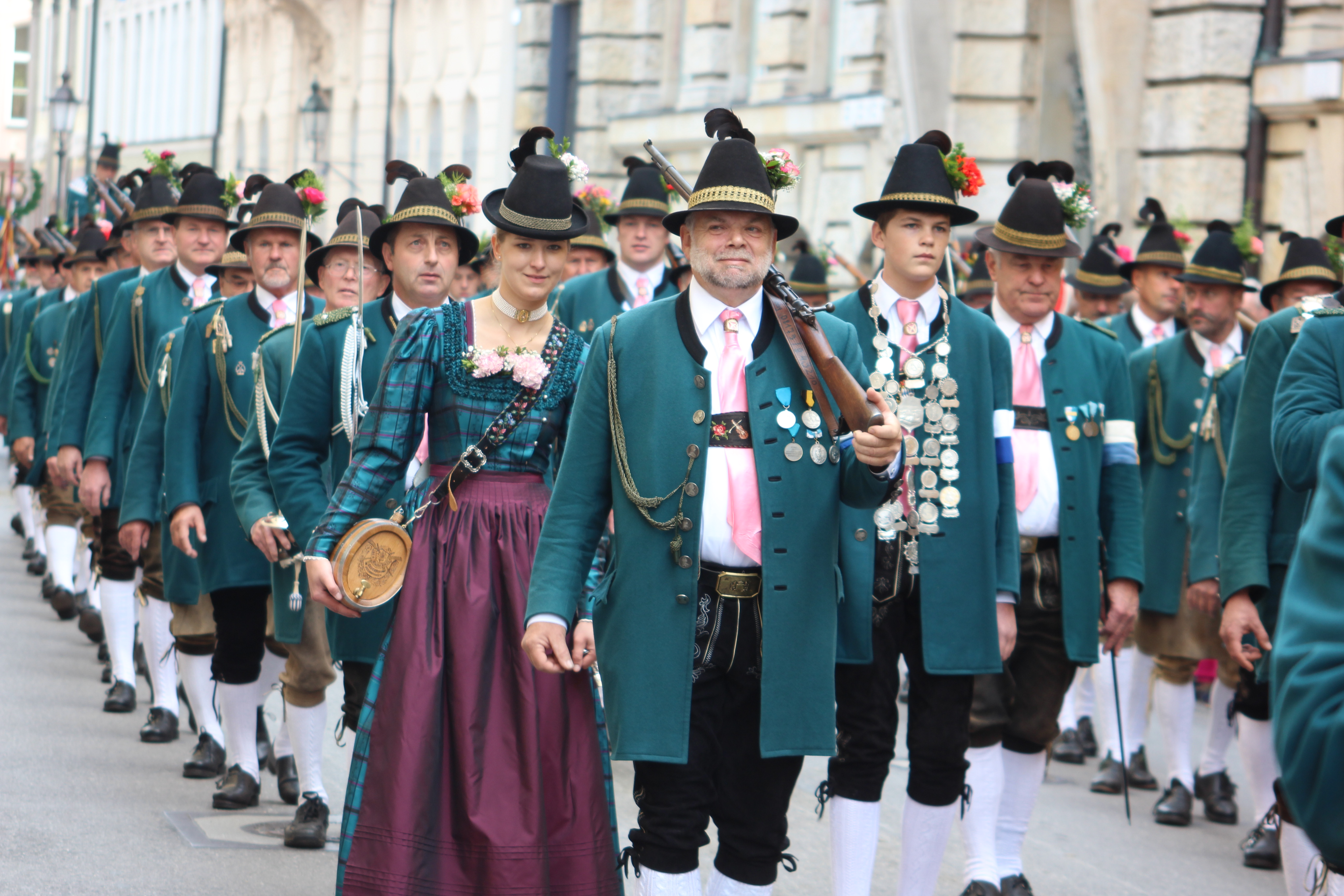
Participants in the 2013 costume and riflemen parade

The modern parade has taken place each year since 1950—except in 2020–2021—and resumed in 2022. It is now a regular feature of Oktoberfest and is among the largest processions of its kind. On the first Sunday of the festival roughly 8,000 participants walk the 7 km (4.3 mi) route from the Maximilianeum to the Theresienwiese.

The procession is led by the Münchner Kindl, followed by members of the Munich city council, representatives of the Bavarian state government, musical and marching bands, traditional-costume and rifle clubs, flag-wavers, and about 40 decorated horse-drawn carriages. Most groups come from Bavaria, though delegations also arrive from other German states, Austria, Switzerland, Northern Italy, and other European regions. The entry of the Wiesnwirte (festival innkeepers) and the costume and marksmen procession are organised by Festring München.

=== Unofficial sport ===
The unofficial sport of Oktoberfest is Masskrugstemmen, or Steinholding, in which competitors hold a filled one-liter dimpled glass mug, with an outstretched arm for as long as they can.

== Duration and dates ==
Since 1994, Oktoberfest has typically lasted 16 days, starting on the first Saturday after 15 September and ending on the first Sunday in October. If that Sunday falls before 3 October (German Unity Day), the festival is extended through 3 October.

Year	Dates	Duration	Notes
2000	16 Sep – 3 Oct	18 days	with ZLF
2001	22 Sep – 7 Oct	16 days	
2002	21 Sep – 6 Oct	16 days	
2003	20 Sep – 5 Oct	16 days	
2004	18 Sep – 3 Oct	16 days	with ZLF
2005	17 Sep – 3 Oct	17 days	
2006	16 Sep – 3 Oct	18 days	
2007	22 Sep – 7 Oct	16 days	
2008	20 Sep – 5 Oct	16 days	175th Oktoberfest, with ZLF
2009	19 Sep – 4 Oct	16 days	
2010	18 Sep – 4 Oct	17 days	200th anniversary, with ZLF
2011	17 Sep – 3 Oct	17 days	
2012	22 Sep – 7 Oct	16 days	with ZLF
2013	21 Sep – 6 Oct	16 days	
2014	20 Sep – 5 Oct	16 days	
2015	19 Sep – 4 Oct	16 days	
2016	17 Sep – 3 Oct	17 days	
2017	16 Sep – 3 Oct	18 days	
2018	22 Sep – 7 Oct	16 days	
2019	21 Sep – 6 Oct	16 days	
2020	19 Sep – 4 Oct	Cancelled	COVID-19 pandemic
2021	18 Sep – 3 Oct	Cancelled	COVID-19 pandemic
2022	17 Sep – 3 Oct	17 days	
2023	16 Sep – 3 Oct	18 days	
2024	21 Sep – 6 Oct	16 days	
2025	20 Sep – 5 Oct	16 days	
2026	19 Sep – 4 Oct	16 days	

The Bayerisches Zentral-Landwirtschaftsfest (Bavarian Central Agricultural Fair) is held every four years alongside Oktoberfest.

== Attendance ==
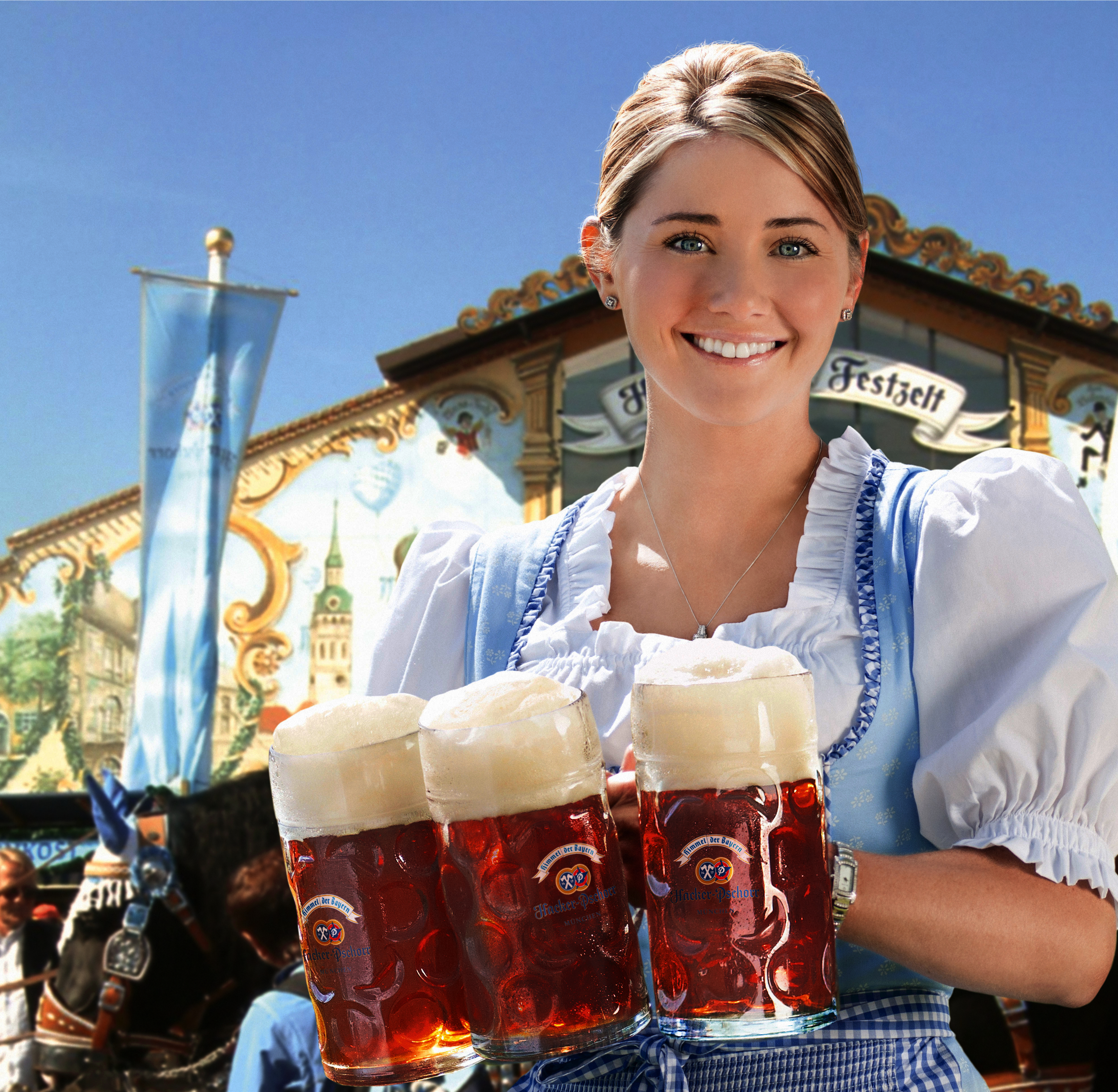
A waitress serves several Maßkrugen of beer, wearing a traditional Bavarian dirndl.

Oktoberfest is one of the largest festivals in the world, attracting millions of visitors annually. In 1999, about 6.5 million people visited the 42-hectare Theresienwiese fairground. Around 72 % of visitors came from Bavaria, and 15 % from abroad, including neighbouring EU countries, North America, Oceania, and East Asia.

The grounds also host other major events such as the Munich Frühlingsfest (April–May) and the Tollwood Festival (December).

== Beer ==
Only beer brewed within Munich's city limits and in accordance with the Reinheitsgebot may be sold at Oktoberfest. These beers are marketed under the protected designation "Oktoberfestbier".

=== Styles ===
Two types of beer are served:

- The traditional Märzen lager, formerly the standard.
- The paler seasonal Festbier, which has become more common since the late 20th century.

=== Breweries ===
The right to produce Oktoberfestbier is held by the six breweries of the Club of Munich Brewers:

- Augustiner Bräu
- Hacker-Pschorr
- Löwenbräu
- Paulaner
- Spaten
- Hofbräu München

== Tents ==
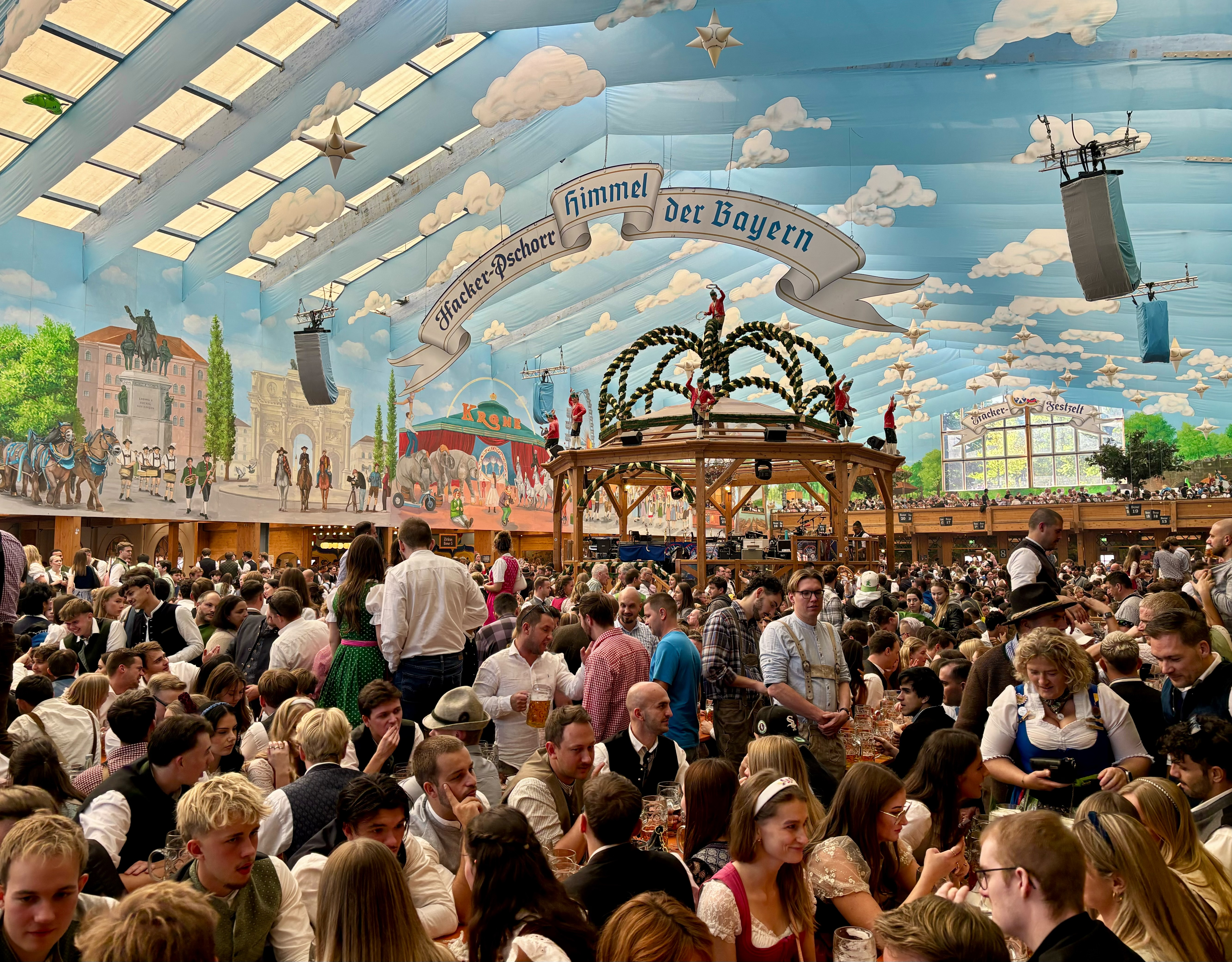
Hacker-Festzelt in 2025

As of 2025, Oktoberfest includes 14 large and 20 small tents. They are temporary wooden structures built for use during the festival.

Each large tent is associated with one of the Munich breweries, while a few smaller tents serve wine.

=== Large tents ===
Tent name	Brewery/operator	Seats (inside / outside)	Description
Marstall	Spaten-Franziskaner-Bräu	3,200 / 1,000	Hosts evening performances, including Münchner Zwietracht playing Oktoberfest music.
Armbrustschützenzelt	Paulaner	5,839 / 1,600	Known as the Crossbowman's Tent; crossbow competitions have been held here since 1895.
Hofbräu-Festzelt	Hofbräu München	6,896 / 3,622	The Hofbräu tent, popular with international visitors.
Hacker-Festzelt	Hacker-Pschorr	6,900 / 2,400	Nicknamed Himmel der Bayern ("Heaven of the Bavarians"); features rock music evenings.
Schottenhamel	Spaten-Franziskaner-Bräu	6,288 / 2,742	Site of the official keg tapping by the mayor; a popular student meeting point.
Paulaner Festzelt	Paulaner	8,450 / 2,450	Identified by its tower topped with a beer mug.
Schützen-Festhalle	Löwenbräu	4,442 / 1,235	Located beneath the Bavaria statue; current structure opened in 2004.
Käfer Wiesn-Schänke	Paulaner	1,000 / 1,900	The smallest large tent; offers gourmet food and opens later in the day.
Weinzelt	Nymphenburger Sekt / Paulaner Weißbier	1,300 / 600	Combines a wine bar (with over 15 varieties) and Paulaner wheat beer.
Löwenbräu-Festhalle	Löwenbräu	5,700 / 2,800	Features a large lion figure above the entrance and two beer towers.
Bräurosl	Hacker-Pschorr	6,000 / 2,200	Named after the brewer's daughter; hosts the Rosa Wiesn LGBT event.
Augustiner-Festhalle	Augustiner Bräu	6,000 / 2,500	Serves Augustiner beer from traditional wooden kegs.
Ochsenbraterei	Spaten	5,900 / 1,500	Specialises in roasted ox dishes.
Fischer-Vroni	Augustiner	2,695 / 700	Known for fish dishes, especially grilled Steckerlfisch.

=== Small tents ===
Tent name	Brewery/operator	Seats (inside / outside)	Description
Able's Kalbs-Kuchl	Spaten	300 / 0	Specialises in veal dishes in a rustic hut setting.
Ammer Hühner- & Entenbraterei	Augustiner	450 / 450	Established in 1885 as a chicken roastery; also serves duck.
Bodo's Cafézelt	Independent	450 / 0	Serves cocktails, sparkling wine, coffee, pastries, and ice cream.
Café Kaiserschmarrn	Rischart	400 / 0	Operated by the Rischart bakery; themed around the royal wedding of 1810.
Café Theres	Independent	420 / 0	Coffeehouse known for cakes and pies, operating since 1950. Until 2021, it was called Café Mohrenkopf.
Feisinger's Ka's und Weinstubn	Independent	92 / 90	Focuses on cheese dishes, wine, and wheat beer.
Glöckle Wirt	Spaten	140 / 0	Decorated with oil paintings and traditional instruments.
Heimer Hendl- & Entenbraterei	Paulaner	400 / 0	Family-run tent serving chicken and duck.
Heinz Wurst- & Hühnerbraterei	Paulaner	360 / 0	Specialises in sausages and chicken; operating since 1906.
Hochreiter's Haxnbraterei	Löwenbräu	250 / 0	Known for pork knuckles, prepared in a dedicated roaster.
Münchner Knödelei	Paulaner	300 / 90	Dedicated to Bavarian dumpling dishes.
Goldener Hahn	Independent	304 / 57	Took over the premises from Poschner’s Hühnenbraterei in 2015.
Schiebl's Kaffeehaferl	Independent	100 / 0	Coffee tent; "Haferl" is a Bavarian term for mug or pot.
Wiesn Guglhupf Café-Dreh-Bar	Independent	60 / 0	Carousel bar shaped like a Guglhupf (bundt cake).
Wildmoser Hühnerbraterei	Hacker-Pschorr	320 / 0	Chicken roastery operated by the Wildmoser family since 1981.
Bartls Flösserstadl	Augustiner	398 / 0	Built in hunting-lodge style with detailed woodwork. Took over the premises from the Münchner Stuben in 2026.
Wirtshaus im Schichtl	Independent	120 / 0	Hosts daily cabaret-style shows unique to Oktoberfest.
Zum Stiftl	Paulaner	360 / 0	Serves roast duck and chicken with daily musical entertainment.
Zur Bratwurst	Augustiner	160 / 0	Opened in 2007, reviving the historical Bratwurstglöckl name.

== Special events ==
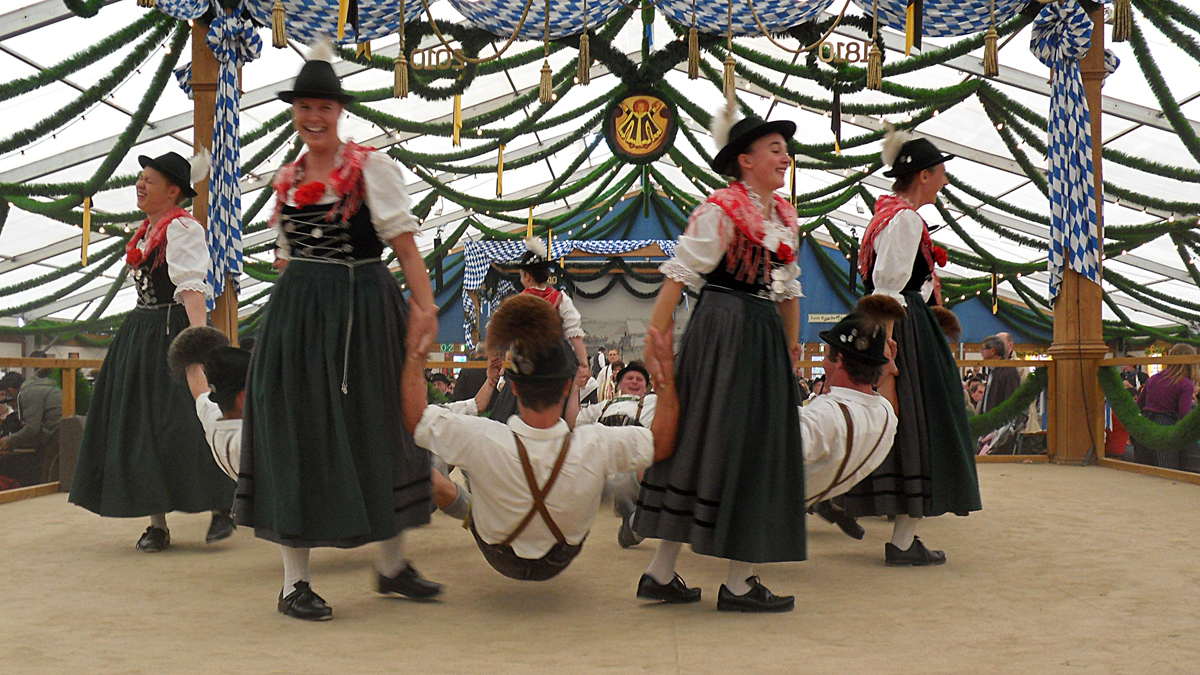
Folk dancers at the historical Oktoberfest

=== Oide Wiesn (historical Oktoberfest) ===
The historical Oktoberfest (Oide Wiesn, Bavarian for "old fairground") was introduced in 2010 for the 200th anniversary of Oktoberfest. It was held on the former site of the Central Agricultural Festival (ZLF) at the south end of the Theresienwiese and became a recurring feature from 2011.

The event opened one day before the main festival with the traditional keg tapping by the Lord Mayor. In 2012, the Munich City Council set the 2013 entry fee at €3 with re-entry permitted, while rides cost €1 per use. Seating in the musicians' tent was expanded, and a €200,000 grant supported the Showman Foundation's museum tent, velodrome, and children's programme. Six Munich breweries presented historical dark beers, mugs bore the inscription "Münchner Bier" instead of logos, and closing time was set at 20:00. Attendance exceeded 500,000 in the first year, leading to temporary closures. The council also approved an Oide Wiesn in 2015 before the return of the Central Agricultural Exhibition in 2016.

The fenced grounds cover 2 hectares (4.9 acres) and feature rides such as a carousel and chain swing, beer tents serving dark beer based on early 19th-century recipes, food stalls including Steckerlfisch grills, an animal tent and racecourse run by Hellabrunn Zoo and the Bavarian Farmers' Association, and a museum tent curated by the Munich Stadtmuseum. Cultural performances have included local groups such as the Biermösl Blosn.

=== Rosa Wiesn (Gay Oktoberfest) ===
The Rosa Wiesn (Pink Wiesn), also called Gay Oktoberfest, is a series of LGBT events held during Oktoberfest. The main gathering, Gay Sunday, takes place in the Bräurosl tent on the first Sunday.

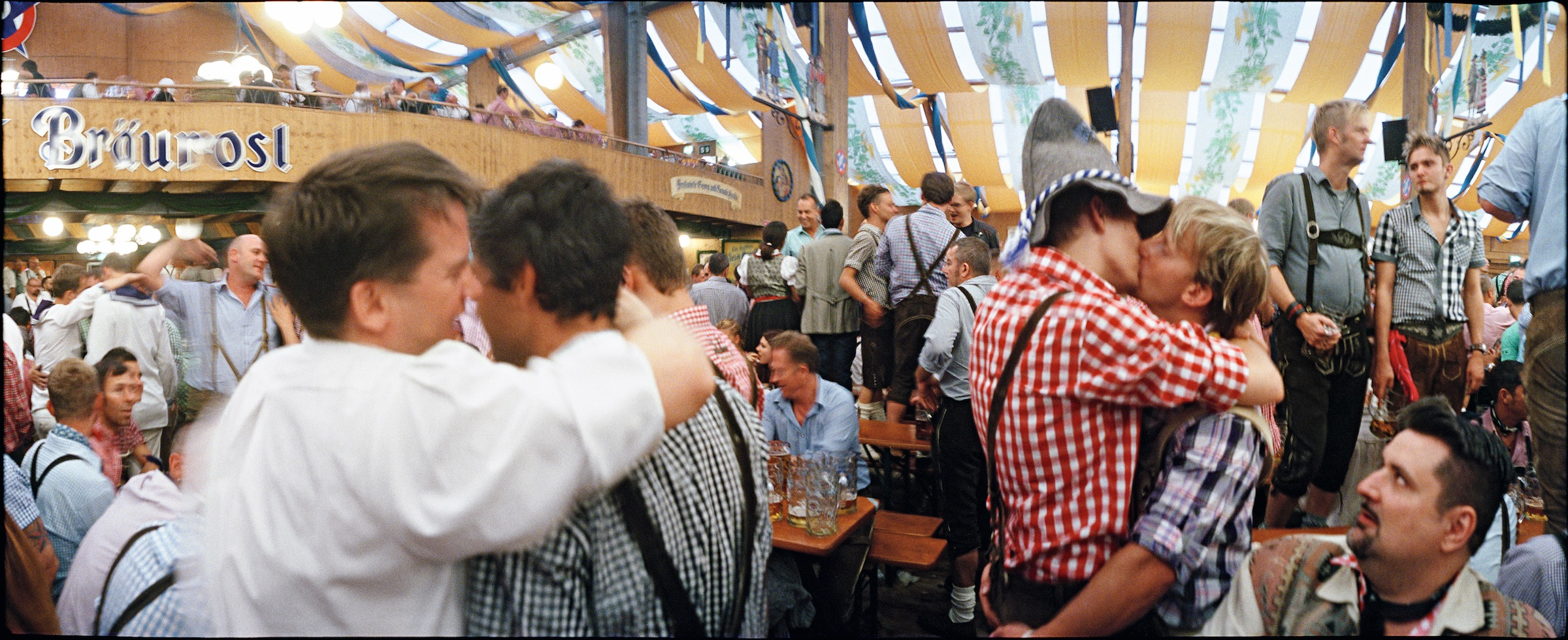
Rosa Wiesn attendees in 2016

The tradition began in the 1970s when members of the Münchner Löwen Club (MLC) reserved the Bräurosl balcony and were mistaken for a football club. The event became an annual gathering.

Alongside Gay Sunday, the programme includes meet-and-greets, Löwennacht (Lion's Night), brunches, and cultural activities. About 8,000 visitors attend each year. Some sources describe it as Germany's second-largest LGBT gathering after Christopher Street Day.

== Public safety ==
In 2004 the Behördenhof ("authorities' court") was established as a service hub for police, fire, medical, and administrative coordination. A temporary police station operates there during the festival.

Since 2005 officers from Bolzano, Italy, have assisted with crowd management and communication, especially on weekends with high numbers of Italian visitors. The Behördenhof, on the eastern side of the Theresienwiese, functions as the main command center.

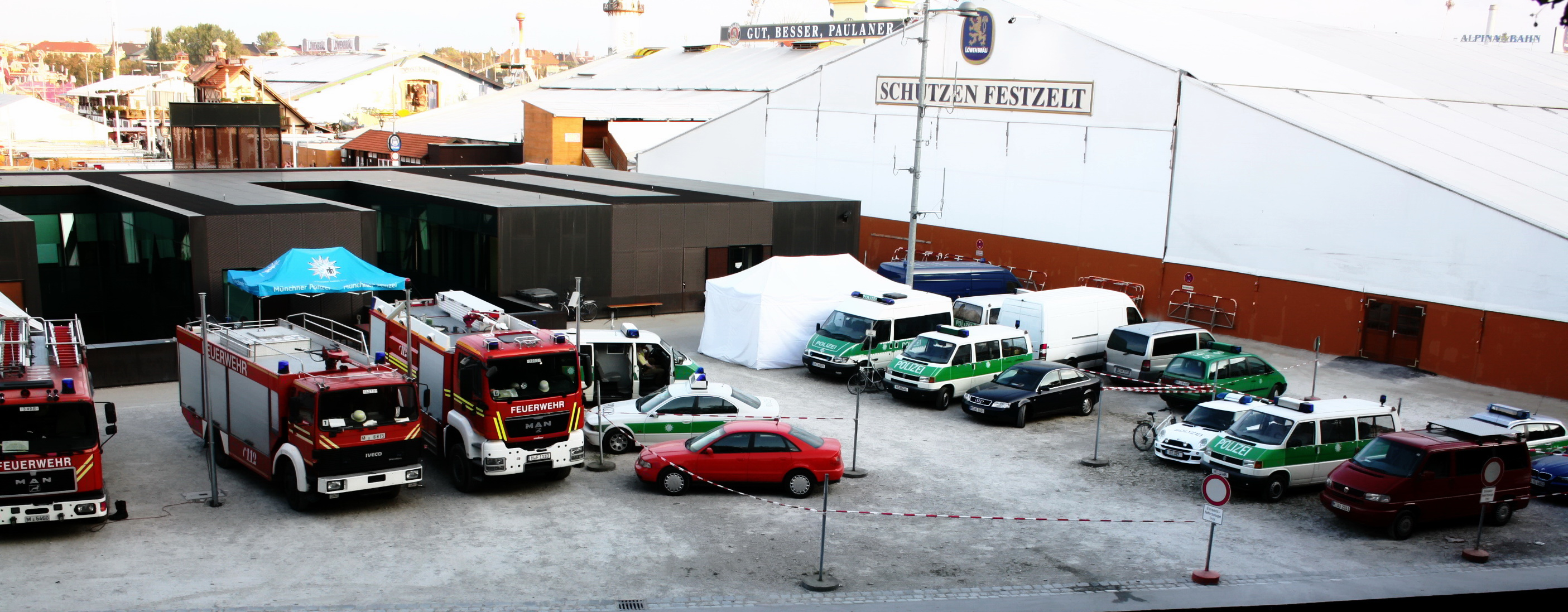
Service hub (Behördenhof) on the Theresienwiese, established 2004

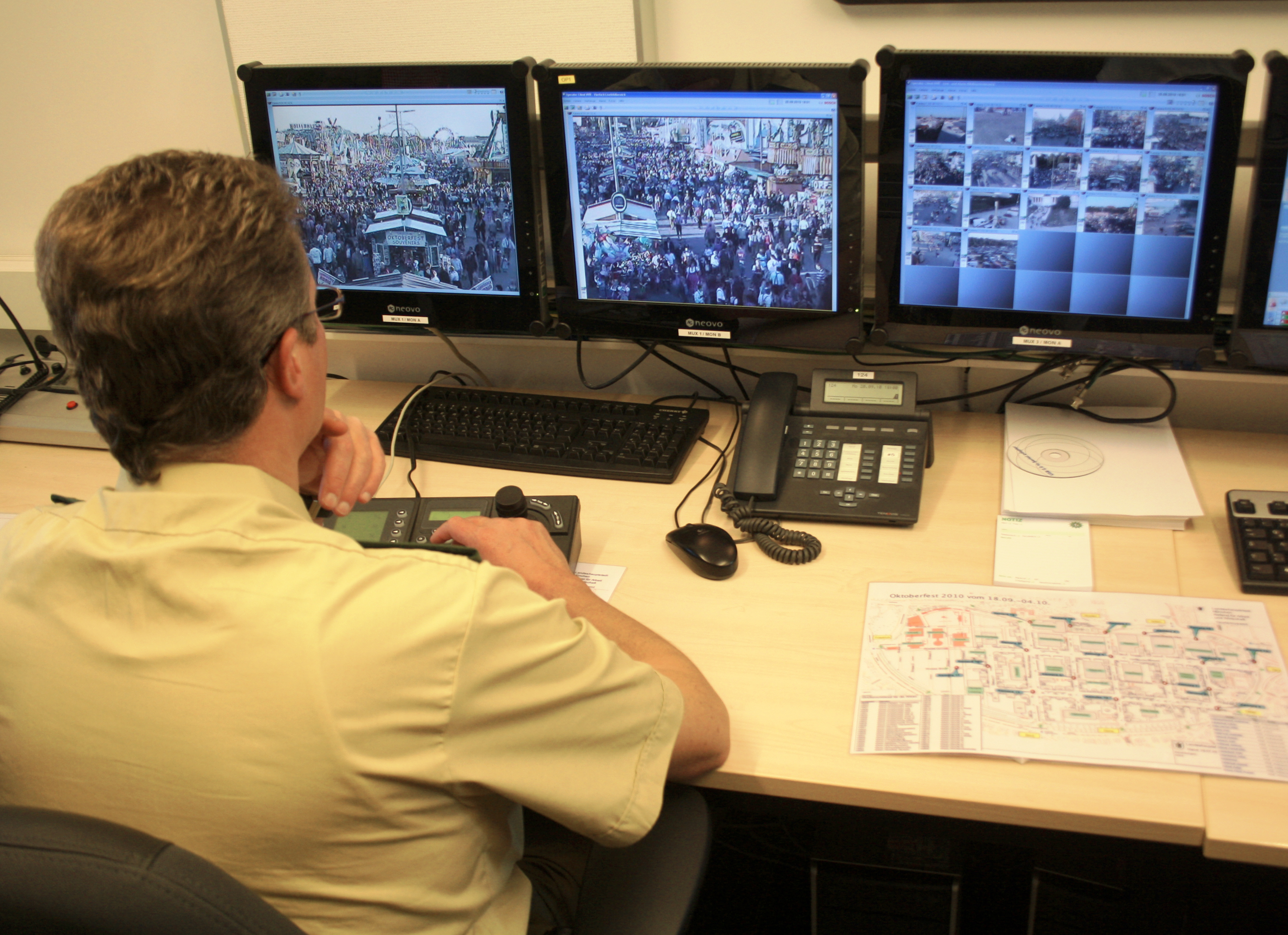
Police surveillance during Oktoberfest, 2010

Medical care is provided by the Bavarian branch of the German Red Cross, with about 100 volunteer doctors and paramedics on duty each day. Aicher Ambulance operates an additional post in the Fischer Vroni tent. The service complex includes an operating theatre and treatment rooms, and ambulances are stationed at key points across the grounds.

Visitor services at the Behördenhof include a child reunification point, a lost property office, and a women's support center. Further assistance is available at the nearby Theresienwiese U-Bahn station, staffed by Johanniter-Unfall-Hilfe.

=== Preventive measures ===
In 2003, the campaign Sichere Wiesn für Mädchen und Frauen ("Safe Oktoberfest for Girls and Women") was launched to prevent sexual violence and abuse against women during the event.

In 2010, animals were banned from the festival grounds. In 2012, glass bottles were prohibited after an increase in injuries caused by broken glass.

=== Ride safety ===
All rides are inspected before the festival by the cableways and temporary structures division of TÜV SÜD.

On 30 September 1996, 30 people were injured in a collision on the Euro Star roller coaster. The cause was a worn safety brake not detected during inspection. Prosecutors in Munich investigated an engineer from TÜV Munich for negligent bodily harm, but no conviction followed.

=== Security developments ===
- 1981 – Main entrance redesigned after the 1980 bombing.
- 2001 – Permanent checkpoints introduced following the September 11 attacks.
- 2008 – Theresienwiese closed to the public during construction.
- 2009 – Roadblocks and stricter access controls introduced in response to security concerns.
- 2010 – Three security rings, flight restrictions, and 52 concrete bollards added.
- 2011 – 170 retractable bollards installed, the Bavariaring emergency corridor widened, and authorities given powers to redirect crowds or close rail stations.
- 2016 – A retractable fence enclosed the final 350 m (1,150 ft) of perimeter. Security staff were stationed at 13 entrances. Bags over 3 L (0.66 imp gal; 0.79 US gal) were banned, and the Theresienwiese U-Bahn front exit was closed.

== Infrastructure ==
=== Electricity ===
Oktoberfest is supplied with electricity through 43 km (27 mi) of cable connected to 18 partly underground transformer stations. They provide about 2.9 million kilowatt-hours per year, excluding the energy required for assembly and dismantling. Since 2012, all businesses at the event have been supplied with certified renewable electricity provided by Stadtwerke München to reduce local emissions.

The electrical grid is designed with redundancy: every circuit can be supplied by an independent line, and each tent is connected to two substations.

==== Notable incident ====
On 25 September 2007, heavy rain flooded an underground cable duct, interrupting power for several hours and delaying morning food service.

=== Natural gas ===
A 4 km (2.5 mi) distribution network supplies gas to the festival grounds. Kitchens consume about 159,000 m³ each season, and outdoor heaters about 42,000 m³.

=== Telecommunications ===
To maintain mobile phone and data coverage in the dense crowds, mobile operators install temporary infrastructure, including additional masts across the site and antennas inside the beer tents. Data consumption at the festival has grown rapidly in recent years. During the 2022 event, visitors used approximately 465 TB of mobile data, which more than doubled the amount consumed in 2019. Additionally, an underground cable network serves approximately 200 vendors, with three beer tents receiving a new fibre-optic connection in 2025.

== Transportation ==
Oktoberfest attracts millions of visitors, and the city provides a range of transport options to manage the crowds. Most people arrive by public transport, while others come on foot, by car, or by taxi. Special measures are introduced each year to handle congestion, parking, and safety.

=== Public transport ===
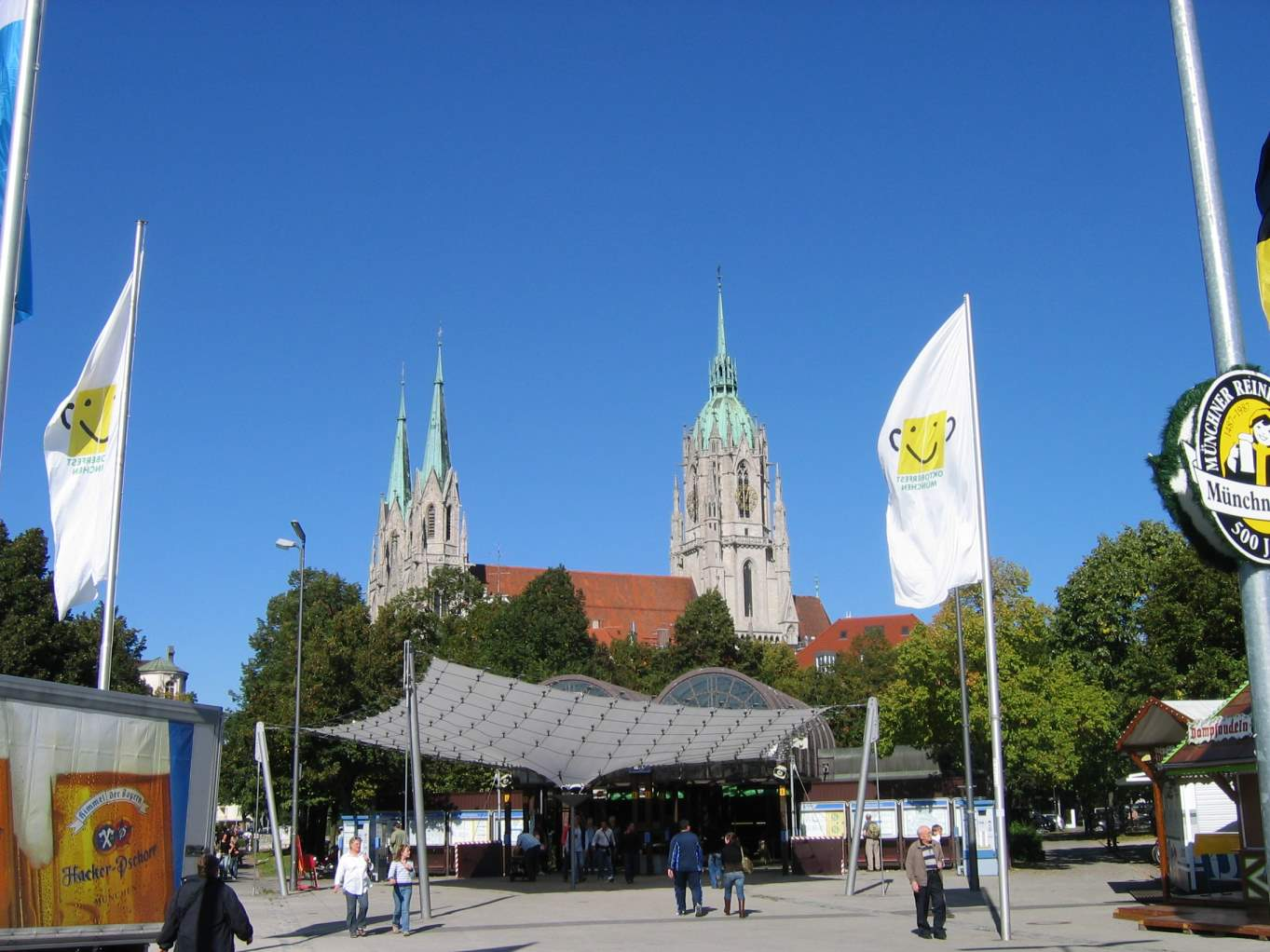
Theresienwiese station during Oktoberfest

The Münchner Verkehrsgesellschaft (Munich Transport Company) estimates that about four million trips are made to and from the grounds each year. The U-Bahn and S-Bahn are heavily used, especially at night. The nearest underground stop, Theresienwiese, runs at three-minute intervals during peak times. After the tents close, the station may be closed temporarily to prevent overcrowding. Extra security staff are deployed by both the transport operator and Deutsche Bahn.

Nearby stations include Goetheplatz, Schwanthalerhöhe, and Hackerbrücke (S-Bahn). Many visitors also walk from the nearby main railway station.

=== Road traffic and parking ===
Road traffic is often congested during the festival. The Bavarian State Police conduct large-scale DUI checks and restrict lanes on major roads and highways. Parking close to the grounds is limited, and towing is common.

During the middle weekend, when many Italian visitors arrive with caravans, the city enforces camping bans in central areas and provides remote parking sites, such as near the Allianz Arena, with public transport connections.

=== Taxis ===
Since 2010, taxi stands have been located outside the secure perimeter, farther from the festival grounds.

== Sanitation ==
Oktoberfest organizers implement strict waste management and restroom policies to maintain hygiene and safety on the festival grounds.

=== Waste management ===
All public trash bins were removed after the 1980 bombing to reduce the risk of concealed explosives. Waste collection is instead handled through centralized disposal systems and frequent cleaning by sanitation teams.

=== Restrooms ===
By 2004, queueing delays at toilets had grown so severe that police managed access. To reduce congestion, patrons needing only to urinate are directed to urinals consisting of large sheltered grates. In 2005, overall capacity was expanded by 20%, and today about 1,800 toilets and urinals are available on the grounds.

In 2005, organizers considered restricting mobile phone use in restrooms through Faraday cage installations and jammers. These measures were abandoned because jammers are illegal in Germany and cages proved too costly. Instead, signage requests that patrons refrain from phone use inside restrooms. In later years, background music was introduced near facilities to discourage prolonged telephone use.

== Other Oktoberfest celebrations ==
Several large folk festivals worldwide follow the model of Munich's Oktoberfest:

- 3 October Festival (Leiden, Netherlands) – approx. 220,000 nationwide visitors
- Qingdao International Beer Festival (Qingdao, China) – approximately 3 million visitors annually
- Belgrade Beer Fest (Belgrade, Serbia) – around 1 million visitors
- Kitchener–Waterloo Oktoberfest (Kitchener, Canada) – around 700,000 visitors annually
- Blumenau Oktoberfest (Blumenau, Brazil) – about 600,000 visitors annually
- Oktoberfest Zinzinnati (Cincinnati, United States) – held since 1976 in honour of the city's German heritage; over 500,000 visitors, the largest in the United States.
- Viennese Wiesn (Vienna, Austria) – inaugural event held 23 September–2 October 2011 on the Kaiserwiese, attended by about 150,000 visitors in three tents.

Festivals inspired by Oktoberfest are also held in Australia, Russia, Namibia and Japan.

=== German variants ===
In Germany itself, many cities host their own Oktoberfest-style events:

- Oktoberfest Hannover – approximately 500,000 visitors, the second-largest Oktoberfest in Germany

== In popular culture ==
A German historical drama called Oktoberfest: Beer and Blood was released in 2020. Set in 1900, it focuses on the showman brewer Curt Prank as he transforms the festival into a global tourist attraction by replacing the local brewery stands with one large pavilion. Critics have compared the show's graphic violence and German new wave music soundtrack to Peaky Blinders. A second season was announced by head writer Ronny Schalk in 2021.

== See also ==
- Beer and Oktoberfest Museum
- Schunkeln (sway dance)
- Steinholding (sport)
- Economy of Munich
