= Festring München =

German traditional organisation

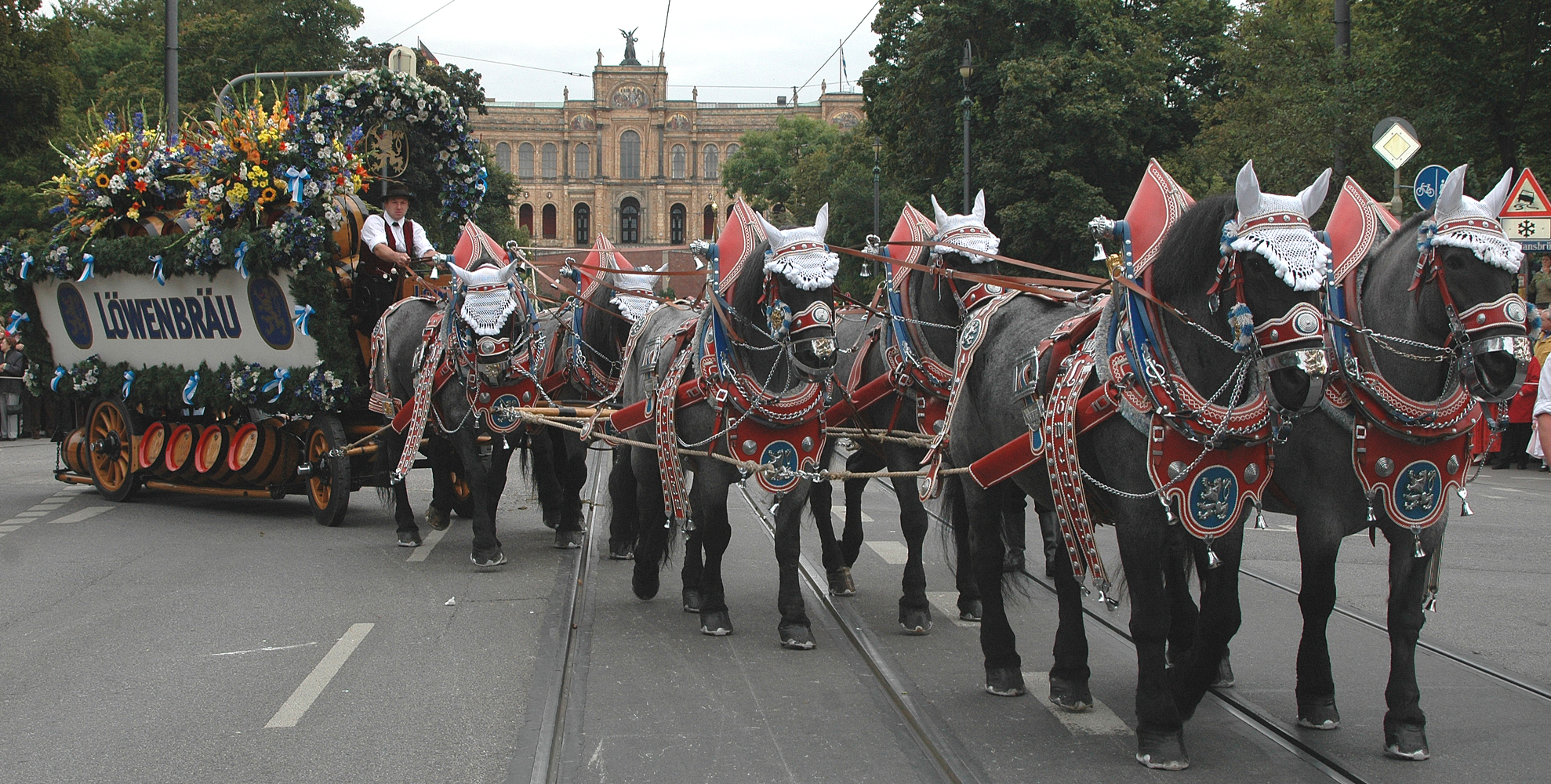
The procession into the Wiesnwirte

The Festring München e.V. (before 2001: Verkehrsverein Festring München e.V.) is a traditional society founded in 1938 and based in Munich.

The purpose of the association is pilgrimages and above all customs events, especially with reference to the Oktoberfest:

- the moving in procession of the festival landlords and breweries (moving in procession of the Wiesnwirte of the Munich Oktoberfest) with more than 10,000 spectators annually and regular live coverage by BR television. Since the year of its foundation, the association has provided the so-called Münchner Kindl (a woman, who is supposed to represent the original; according to historians, however, it was a monk, i.e. a man), the Münchner Kindl is lined up in the ladies' seat on horseback at the beginning of the procession.
- Trachten- und Schützenzug on the occasion of the Munich Oktoberfest; it takes place the following day and starts from the Max II monument; the duration of this procession is about two hours The splendid teams of Munich breweries, traditional costume and music groups as well as sports and mountain shooters are presented.

Both major events are organized and carried out under the sole responsibility of the association.

Manfred Newrzella has been chairman since 2001, and is also chairman of the Vereins der Münchner Brauereien (Breweries Association). The association is financially supported by the Munich city administration.
