= ESPN8 The Ocho =

Annual feature of obscure sports on ESPN

- Founded: August 8, 2017; 9 years ago
- Parent: ESPN

ESPN8 The Ocho is a special program block showcasing seldom-seen obscure sports that airs on the networks of ESPN Inc. The Ocho is also offered as a free ad-supported streaming television (FAST) channel on the Roku Channel, Prime Video, and DirecTV Stream.

The Ocho consists of lesser-known, unconventional and humorous sports, occupational competitions, esports and other competitions with some athletic, competitive or physical skill component, such as axe throwing, cornhole, and paintball. The block is traditionally presented in early August, the eighth month of the year. Much of the programming consists of previously recorded content and reruns previously aired on the ESPN networks, some as far back as the 1990s.

== Origins ==
The concept of ESPN8 originated as a fictional television channel in the 2004 film Dodgeball: A True Underdog Story, in which it was a full-time channel showcasing obscure competitions that are "almost a sport". Its name was a comic exaggeration; at the time, there were only four linear English-language ESPN channels in the U.S.: ESPN, ESPN2, ESPNEWS and the now defunct ESPN Classic; the fifth, ESPNU, launched a year after the film. Its nickname, "The Ocho" (Spanish for "eight") was a play on ESPN2's 1990s nickname, "The Deuce."

Starting August 8, 2017, ESPN paid homage to its lampooned portrayal in Dodgeball by airing a day-long "ESPN8: The Ocho" marathon on its college sports channel ESPNU as a way to fill airtime on the channel during the collegiate offseason. The 2017 airing was a success, prompting ESPN to repeat the block the following year, this time licensing the Dodgeball film from 20th Century Fox for inclusion in the block; it made some other adjustments to the 2018 schedule, including heavier editing to shorten each sport's time slot, hoping to accommodate short attention spans.

== Continuation ==
Due to a lack of live sports programming during the COVID-19 pandemic, ESPN announced on March 22, 2020 that it would reprise the stunt earlier than scheduled on ESPN2. It did it on May 2, 2020, on ESPN, and then August 8, 2020, on ESPN2 as well as the Big Screen in Fortnite Party Royale. A collection of sports that were featured on ESPN8, as well as the ESPN8 broadcast on these said networks, were available on the ESPN app.

From 2022 to 2024, the majority of "OCHO Day" programs were events broadcast live from two venues in Rock Hill, South Carolina – The Rock Hill Sports & Event Center and Manchester Meadows. Rock Hill is a suburb of Charlotte, North Carolina, where ESPN has production facilities for ESPNU and the SEC Network. In 2025, ESPN8 events moved to the Wide World of Sports Complex in Orlando, Florida.

The event was held again on ESPN2 on August 3, 2023. For 2024, to celebrate "ocho years of The Ocho," the block expanded to four days, with the Savannah Bananas as the tent-pole; all three games of the team's Louisville, Kentucky series were telecast live in prime time, including the second game on ESPN's flagship channel, the first time the ESPN8 brand has expanded there. For 2025, the tent-pole of the event was the American Cornhole League world championships, with the various division championships being held in Rock Hill and aired throughout the event on ESPN, ESPN2 and ESPNU under the ESPN8 brand. The block will celebrate its tenth anniversary, styled as "ESPN8 The OCⱵ10," from August 6–9, 2026. In a press release announcing the anniversary celebration, network representatives stated that the event would be celebrating the block's success and evolution into a permanent part of the ESPN portfolio, with the introduction of 23 new events to the lineup.

In December 2023, ESPN launched an ESPN8 free ad-supported streaming television (FAST) channel on ABC.com and the ABC app. In April 2024, the FAST channel launched in Canada under the name TSN The Ocho. In late 2024, with the ABC app's phaseout, ESPN8 moved to The Roku Channel; ESPN8 is also available as a free channel on DirecTV Stream.

== Impact ==
The tongue-in-cheek inclusion of such sports on ESPN's schedule has led to increased exposure opportunities for those sports, which have performed well for ESPN. ESPN added a cornhole tournament airing in July 2018 outside the block, which it noted, outdrew the WNBA All-Star Game, regular season Major League Baseball games, and the final stage of the Tour de France among the key demographic of men age 18 to 49. ESPN representatives noted that ESPN8 garnered higher favorability marks than the network as a whole and serve as a welcoming change of pace from the network's usual approach to sports journalism, also noting that the selection of sports in the lineup includes a number of competitions that the average viewer could realistically play, making the event more relatable and the dream of appearing on ESPN more accessible and realistic. The inclusion of the Excel World Championships, an eSport that involves using spreadsheet programs in a competition to solve a series of problems, helped give the contest mainstream attention and credibility. The block is also credited with bringing Banana Ball to mainstream recognition.

ESPN8 appeared in the 2024 TV series Knuckles as the in-universe broadcaster of a bowling tournament, with commentators played by Rob Huebel and Paul Scheer.

On March 24, 2026, Hearst Television (which has a 20% stake in ESPN) debuted ESPN8: The Ocho as a digital subchannel on Clermont, Florida-licensed station WKCF (serving Orlando and Central Florida), becoming the first local television station in the United States to carry the FAST channel as a 24-hour digital subchannel network.

== Scheduling ==
=== 2026 ===
Several of these events are being carried across multiple nights. Each event is listed under the day its first new episode in 2026 (other than events only scheduled to air as encores) is scheduled to air.

==== August 6 ====
- Red Bull Spin Off
- Red Bull Soapbox Race
- Racing from Emerald Downs
  - T-Rex World Championship Races
  - Corgi races
- Weiner Dog Derby from Meadowlands Racetrack
- NuLu Bock Fest Goat Racing Championships
- Great Bahamian Crab Races
- World Dog Surfing Championships
- Alberta Pro Roller Hockey League Blackbird Cup

==== August 7 ====
- National Ball Hockey League championship (from 2025)
- Golden Tee Golf World Championship
- Stern Pro Circuit Heads-Up Pinball Invitational
- Death Diving League (2025 tour event)
- NHRL Robot Fighting (encore from 2025)
- National Tractor Pulling Association Unlimited Pulling Tractors (encore from 2025)
- Grass Drag Racing (encore)
- FlingGolf LFC 5 longest fling competition
- The Putting Zone Shootout by National Putting Tour
- Bike polo championships
- Broom hockey championship
- Bottlesbee Pro Tour presented by Gronk Fitness
- PaddleSmash championship
- National Beach Tennis Invitational
- Donk Toss: World Championship and Bikini Island Challenge (a variant of Pass the Pigs with large, inflatable donkey toys)
- Big League Wiffleball World Series
- Turf Wars Kickball all-star matchup
- Roofball U.S. Open
- International Combat Archery Association Combat Archery All-Stars
- Housekeeping Games
- International dodgeball showcase: Team Canada vs. Team USA
- American Popdarts League Championship
- Pop-a-Shot National Championship
- Slippery Stairs Primetime Chaos Tour
- Banana Ball Championship League: Loco Beach Coconuts vs. Savannah Bananas at Target Field
- World Juggling Federation Championships

==== August 8 ====
- World Series of Armwrestling finals
- Hollywood Steinholding Invitational
- National Bubble Gum Blowing Championship presented by Big League Chew (encore from 2025)
- Wisconsin Auctioneers Championship (encore from 2023)
- Major League Table Tennis (encore presentation)
- Speed Chess Championship (encore from 2022)
- Freestyle Chess Grand Slam Final (encore)
- Microsoft Excel World Championship
- USA Jigsaw Nationals
- Diving Chess
- Fire Department Racing
- Brewskee ball
- Hackysack
- Blaster tag Invitational presented by Blaster Alliance of New England
- BullShooter Invitational (electronic darts)
- U.S. Ultimate (Disc) Championships
- United Grid League: New York Wolves vs. Tampa Bay Brigade
- World Axe and Knife Throwing Championships
- OmegaBall Men's Championship
- International Jump Rope Union Freestyle Sprint (along with 2025 World Championships encore earlier in the event)
- FlingGolf Lowcountry Open
- Pro Paintball 3v3 World Championship
- Red Bull Flugtag
- Red Bull Non-Stock 600
- Blimp racing: Goodyear Blimp Tri in the Sky
- Two Goalies All Goalie Game
- Big Boy Soap Hockey Tournament

==== August 9 ====
- Nok Hockey Championship
- Pumpkin sling
- Extreme Archery Tag Championship
- World Championships of Foosball
- Optima Moto Rodeo
- Bronco Off Course Desert Scramble
- American Cornhole League World Championships

== See also ==
- ABC's Wide World of Sports
- ESPN
- T-Rex World Championship Races
- World Axe Throwing League
