= Stollbergstraße 20 =

Historical building in Munich, Bavaria, Germany

Coordinates: 48.1378°N 11.5833°E

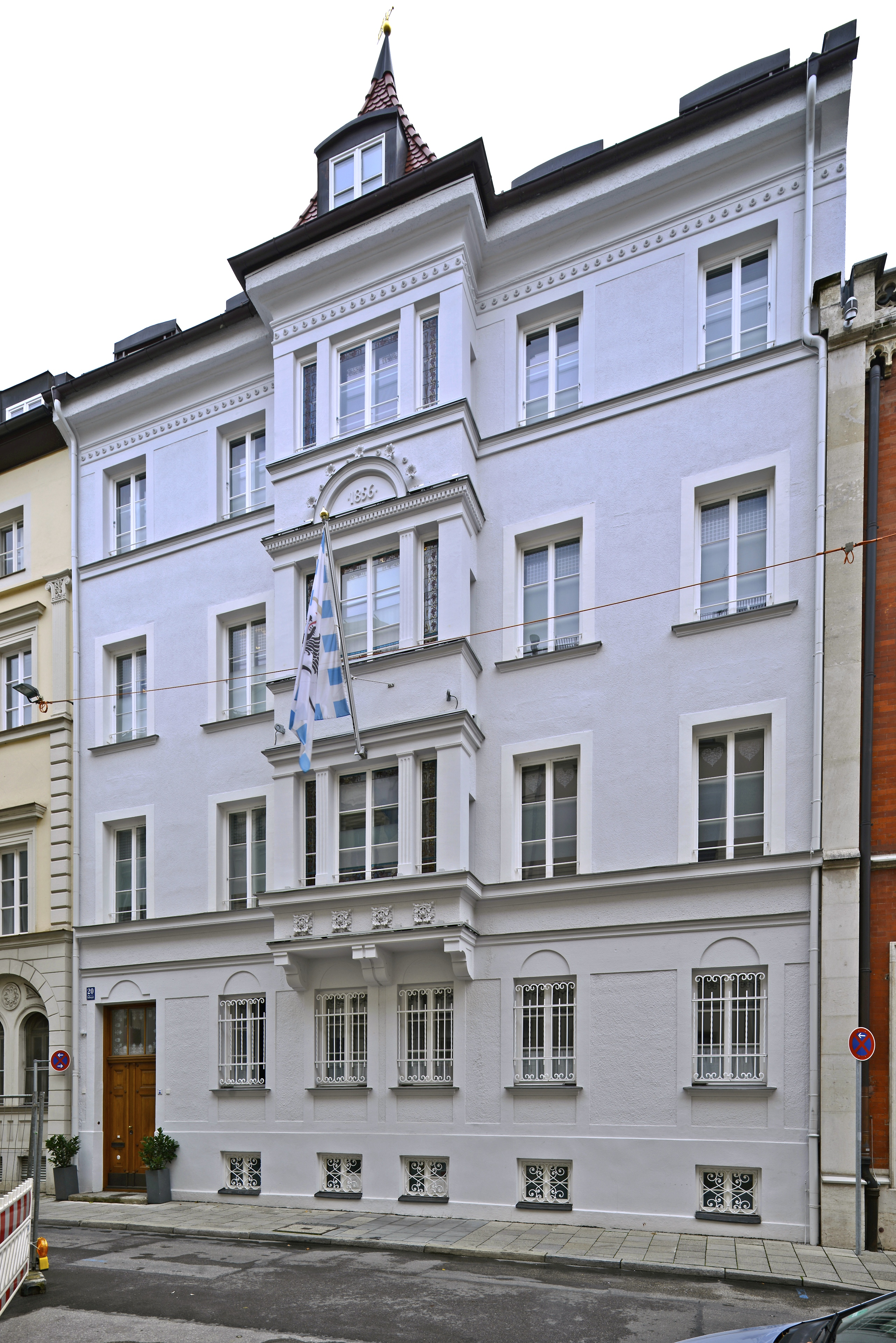
Stollbergstraße 20, front side

Stollbergstraße 20, is a building located in the old town of Munich, Germany. The main and auxiliary buildings are part of the historical building ensemble of the old town.

== Stollbergstraße ==
Stollbergstraße is a street named in 1968 after Georg Stollberg (1853-1926), director of the Schauspielhaus on Maximilianstraße (today's Münchner Kammerspiele) and long-time director of the Staatstheater am Gärtnerplatz. The road leads from Herrnstraße to Maximilianstraße. It was formerly the northwestern section of the Kanalstraße, which was separated by the Altstadtring (section Thomas-Wimmer-Ring) from the still old name bearing eastern part and was disconnected at the southern end to Herrnstraße. Like its northern continuation beyond the Maximilianstraße, the Herzog-Rudolph-Straße, its course corresponds to the moat on the outside of the former wall fortification from the first half of the 17th century.

== History ==
The original three-storey residential building on a square floor plan was built in 1856 on behalf of Julius Grubert, Managing Director of Palmsche Hofbuchhandlung, it was designed by Matthias Berger and supervised by Friedrich Bürklein. The original façade tiling, signed by Berger and Bürklein, shows a sparing division in the Maximilian style, with Gothic elements on the flat center-piece crowned with a pointed helmet. On the courtyard side, the construction was higher due to an additional lower level.

The foundation of the building was partly built on the remains of the former wall fortification of the city center. In 1890, architect Emil Ludwig led an expansion of the lower levels on the courtyard side. On the street side, the house was increased by three rooms. The Neo-Renaissance layout of the façade likely dates to the same period, but it was later simplified. In the middle of the back of the house, a floor expansion was added (kitchen extension) in 1900, south of which in 1905 an altane was added by Heilmann and Littmann. In the historic garden is a small teahouse from the 19th century. The original ceiling painting depicts flying birds and leaves.

== Renovation and today's use ==
In 2013, the building was acquired by a private investment company owned by Peter Löw and re-developed according to the specifications of the historical building protection regulations. Historic features were preserved, including original door frames and windows, as well as stucco and wooden floors from the late 18th century. Due to the redevelopment, it was removed from the historical building list on 22 December 2014.
