= Pop-A-Shot =

Electronic basketball game

A Pop-A-Shot is an electronic basketball shooting game, often in an arcade game form, that typically uses smaller scaled balls and baskets and use a sloped fabric base which returns the balls to the player as they continuously shoot.

== Overview ==
A Pop-A-Shot is most commonly played in a timed form, where a player attempts to make the most baskets or score the most points in a set time. Most Pop-A-Shots have two baskets which allow up to two players to play against one another.

== History ==
The original Pop-A-Shot was invented in 1981 by Ken Cochran in Salina, Kansas. Cochran, a former college basketball coach at Marymount College in Salina, invented the game for young children to play which resulted in instant success and major popularity across the U.S.

== Popular culture ==
The Pop-A-Shot has been featured on ESPN8 The Ocho in formal competition among other obscure sports, including in a national championship game.
