= Beer and Oktoberfest Museum =

Coordinates: 48°08′07″N 11°34′49″E

- Bier- und Oktoberfestmuseum
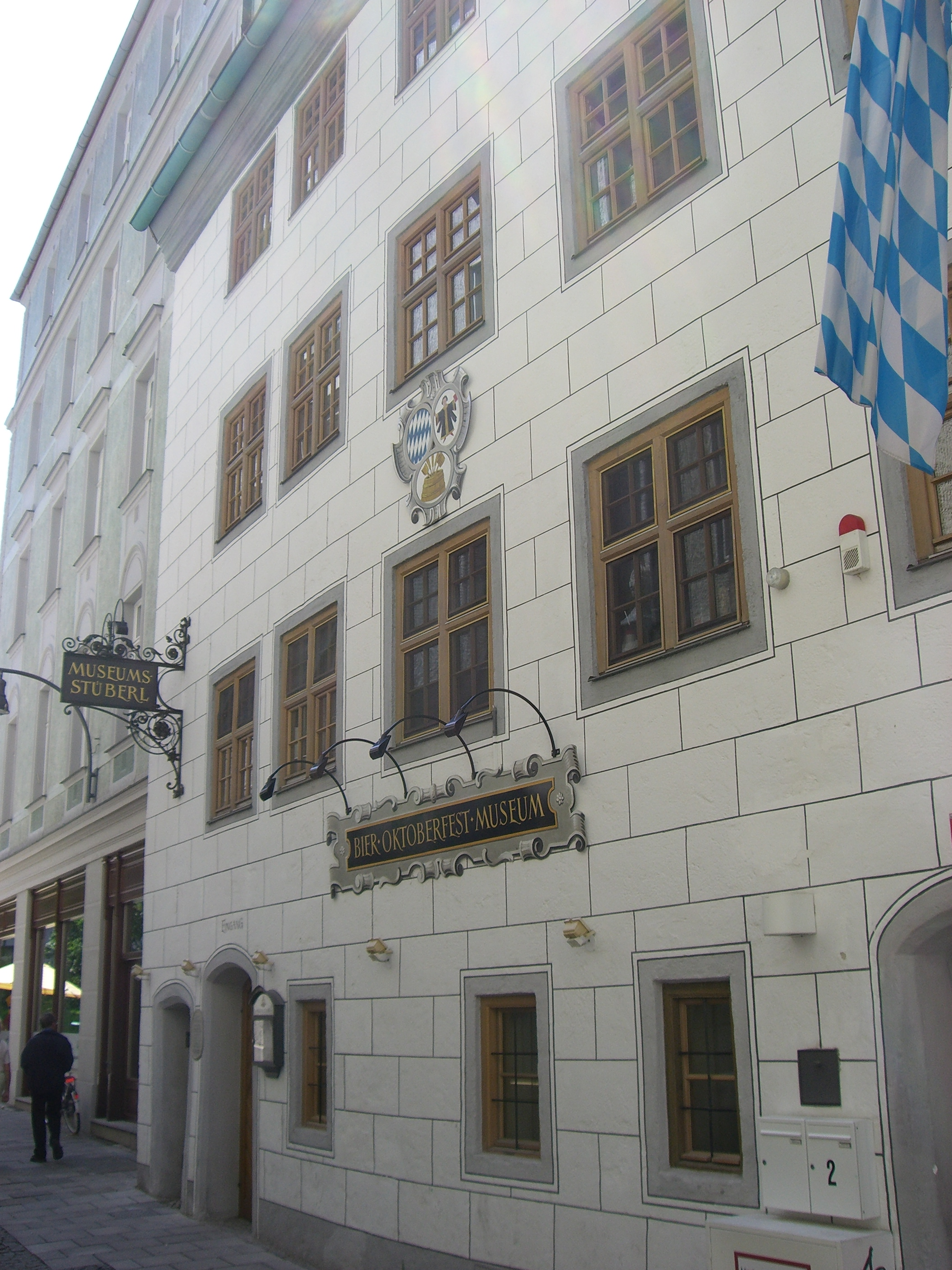
- Established: 7 September 2005
- Location: Munich
- Type: Brewery Museum
- Website: Official website

The Beer and Oktoberfest Museum (German: Bier- und Oktoberfestmuseum) in Munich deals with the history of beer and the Munich Oktoberfest.

The museum was opened on 7 September 2005 and is housed in an old town house in the old town from the year 1327. The building is accessed inside through a staircase, which is nearly 500 years old, has 43 steps and extends over four floors.
