= Friedrich Bürklein =

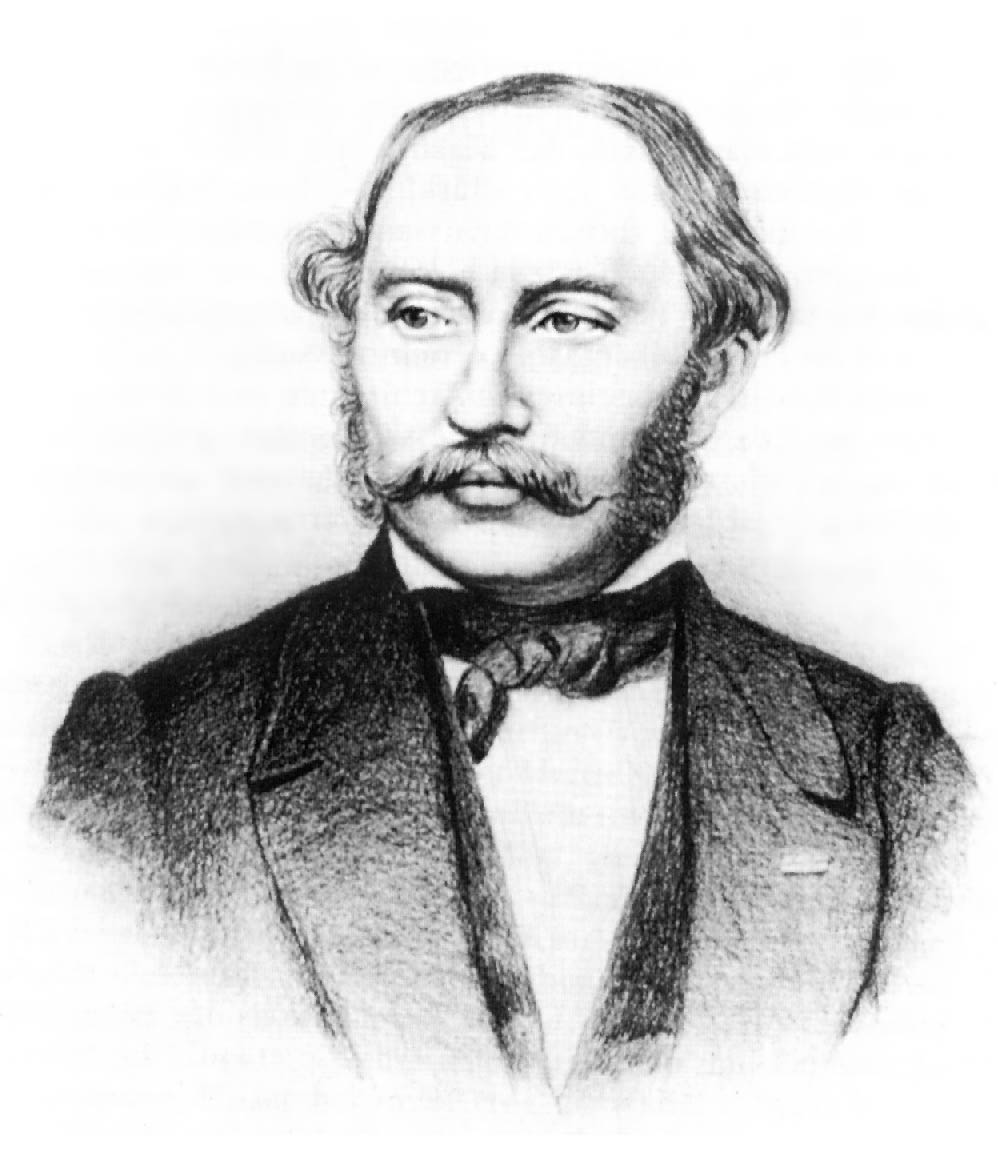
- Portrait of F. Bürklein
- Born: 30 March 1813; Burk, Middle Franconia
- Died: 4 December 1872 (aged 59); Werneck, German Empire
- Resting place: Alter Südfriedhof, Munich
- Occupation: Architect

Georg Friedrich Christian Bürklein (30 March 1813 – 4 December 1872) was a German architect and a pupil of Friedrich von Gärtner.

== Biography ==
He was born in Burk, Middle Franconia. His first important work was the construction of the town hall in Fürth (1840–50) which is influenced by the Palazzo Vecchio in Florence.

Bürklein created also the Hauptbahnhof in Munich (1847–1849) with its steel construction and the stations of Augsburg, Bamberg, Ansbach, Neu-Ulm, Hof, Nördlingen, Rosenheim, Würzburg, Nuremberg and Bad Kissingen.

From 1851 Bürklein was the chief architect of the royal Maximilianstraße in Munich with all its state buildings including the Maximilianeum. Its Neo-Gothic architecture was influenced by the Perpendicular style and was strongly disputed. Before the Maximilianeum was finished Bürklein was replaced by Gottfried Semper. The sensitive Bürklein died mentally deranged in the sanatorium of Werneck. He is buried in the Alter Südfriedhof in Munich. In June 2015, the Bavarian Parliament named the entrance hall of the Maximilianeum after Friedrich Bürklein.

== See also ==
Stollbergstraße 20
