= Alte Münze =

Building in Munich, Germany

Coordinates: 48°08′19″N 11°34′44″E

The Alte Münze (Old Mint Yard) is a renaissance building in Munich which originally served for the ducal stables and the art collections (Kunstkammer) of Duke Albrecht, Albert V, Duke of Bavaria.

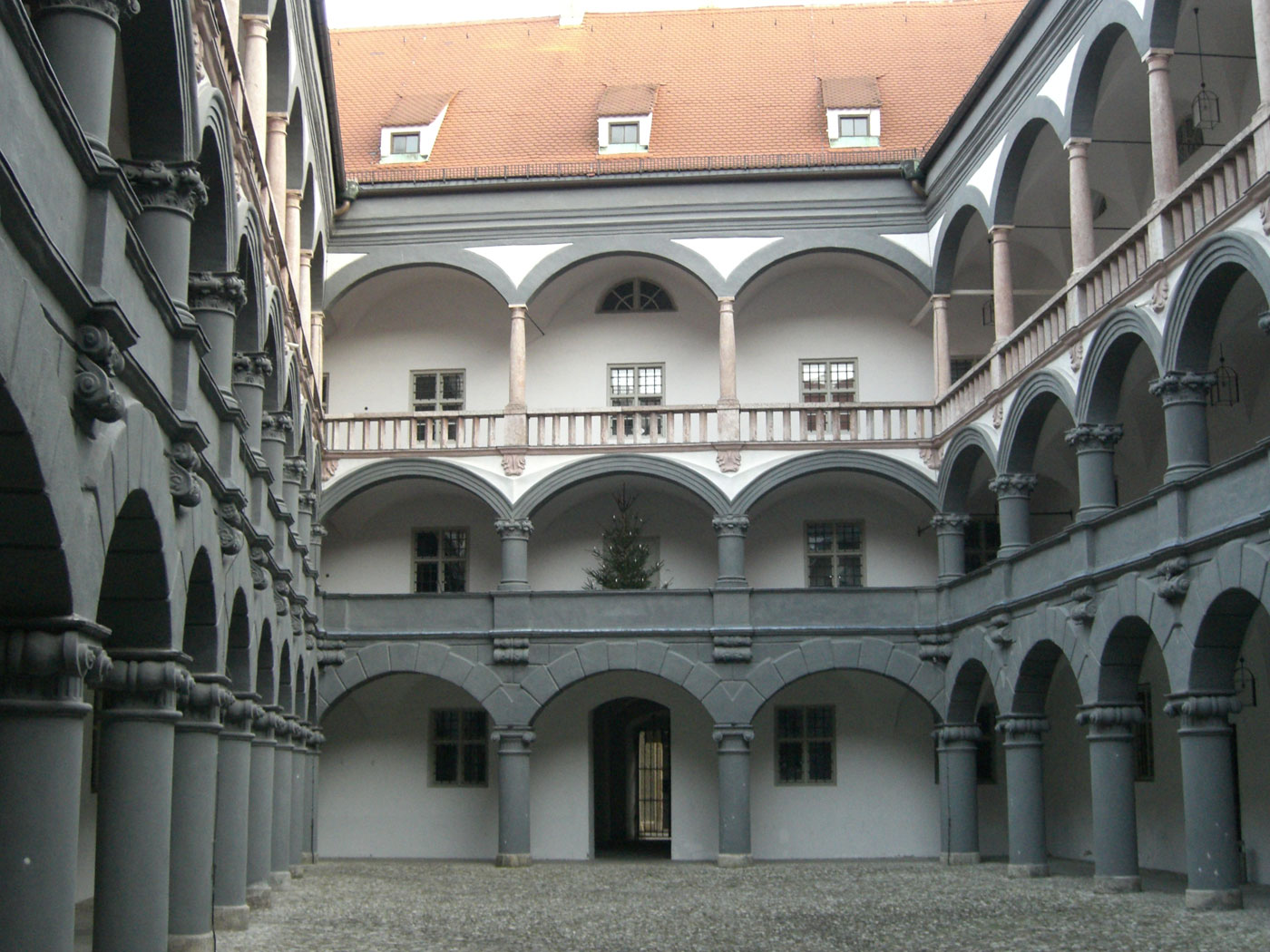
The mint yard

It was constructed by court architect Wilhelm Egkl in 1563. Later it served as mint. The inner courtyard has kept its renaissance arcades while the west facade was redesigned in neoclassical style in 1809. Finally the north facade facing got its neogothic decoration when the Maximilianstrasse was built to fit it with the concept of this royal avenue. An arch in the south connects the building with the castle Alter Hof.
