= Maximilianstraße (Munich) =

Shopping street in Munich, Germany

Coordinates: 48.138°N 11.586°E

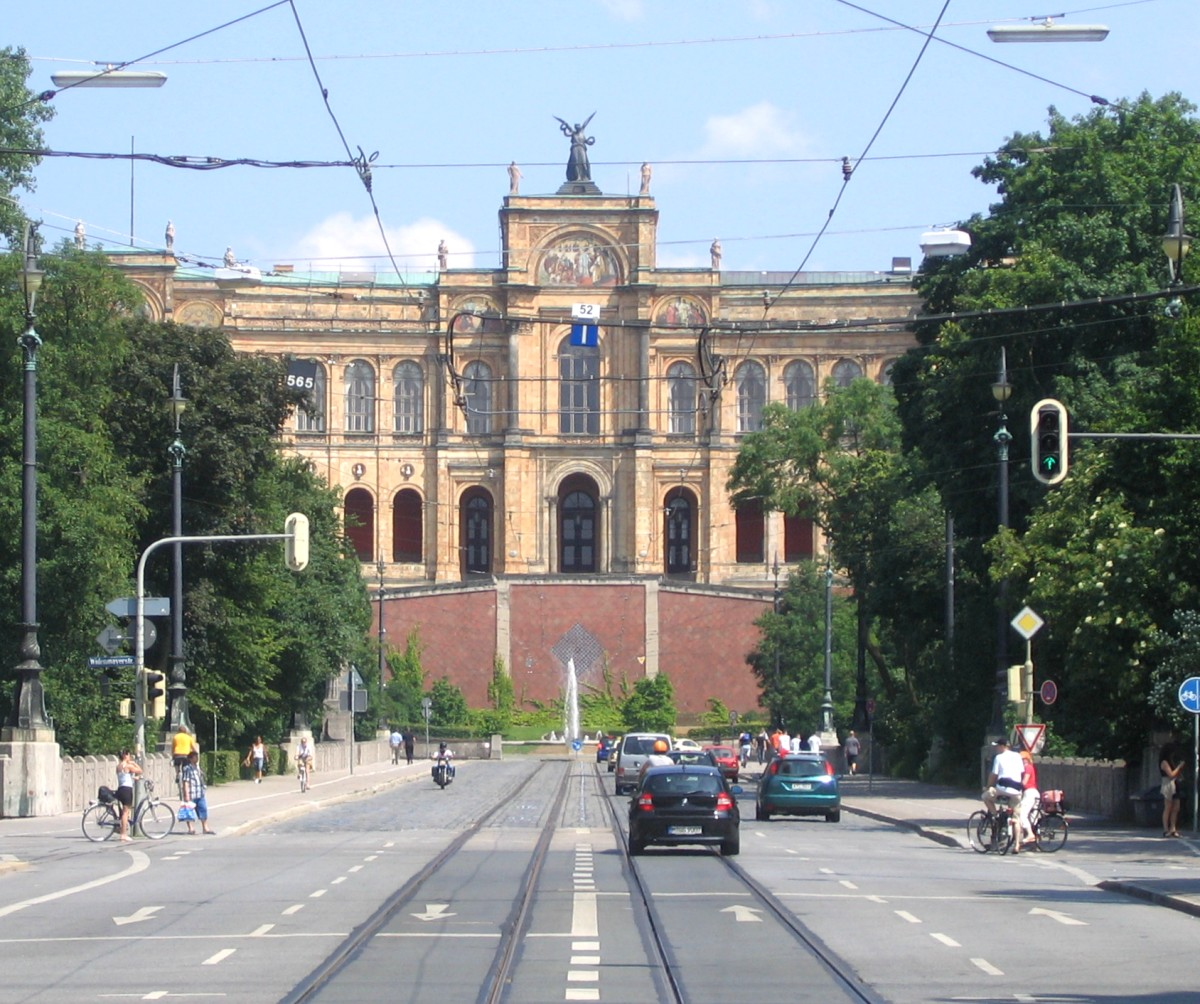
Maximilianeum.

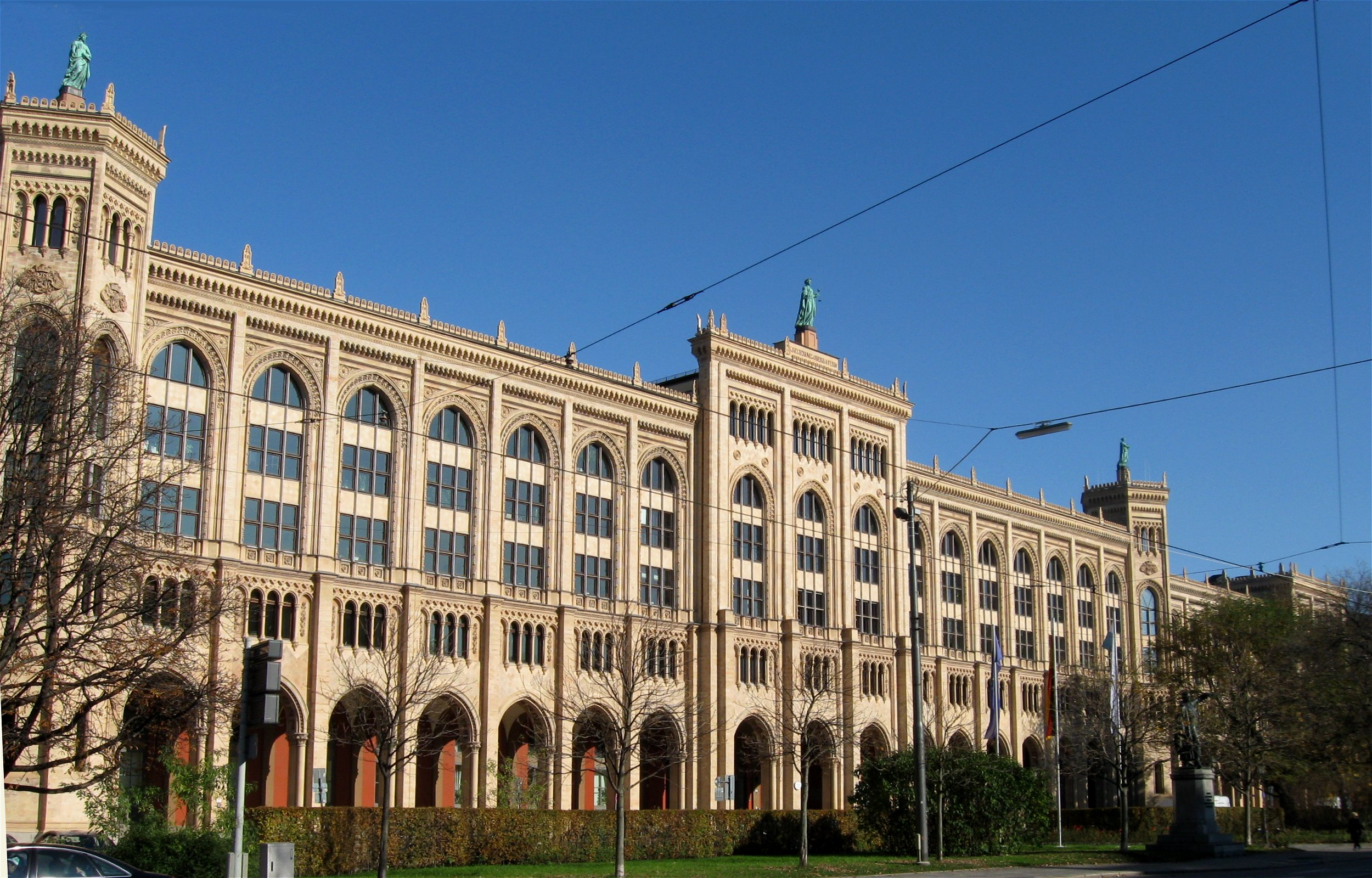
Building of the district government of Upper Bavaria.

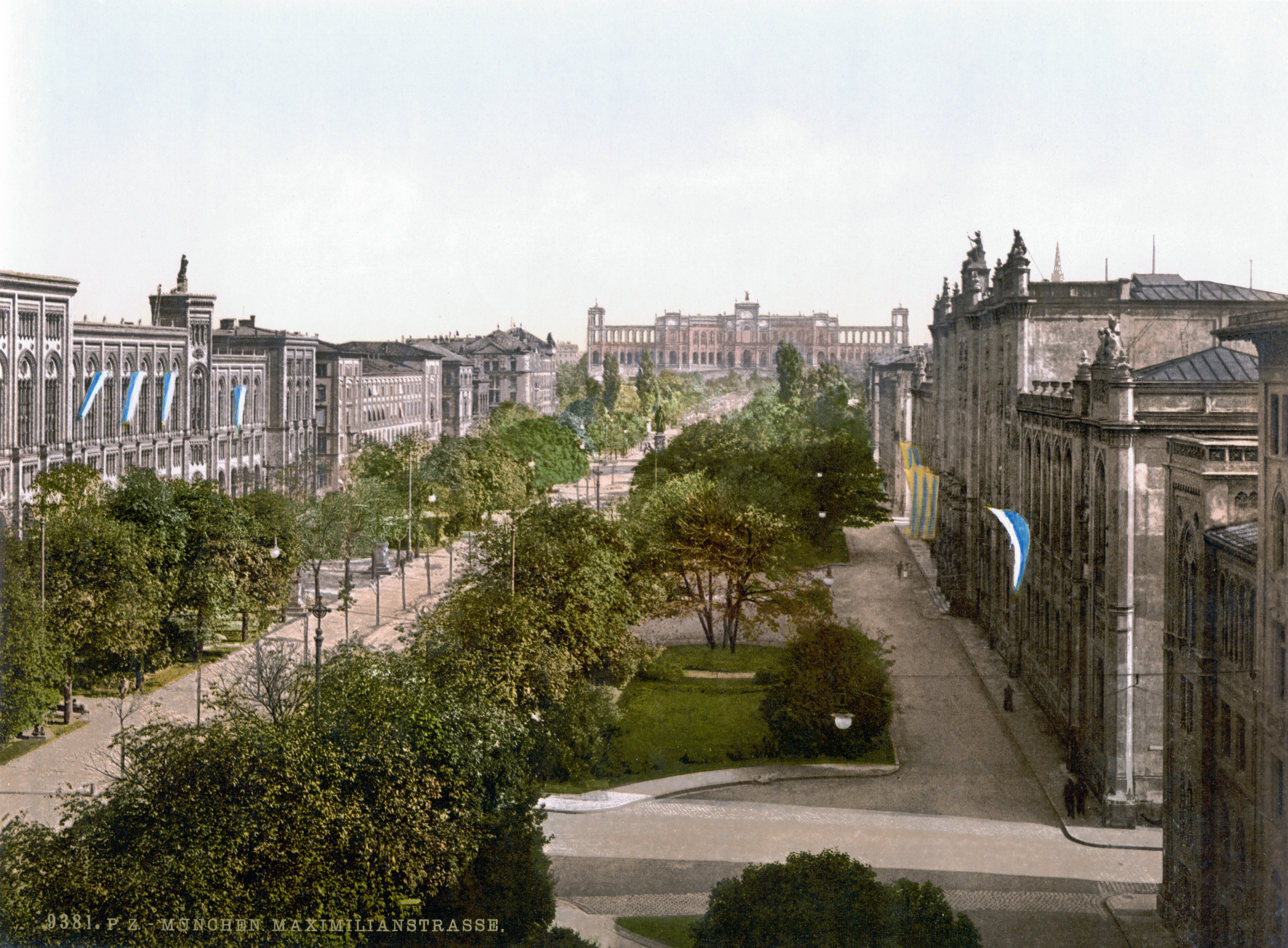
Maximilianstraße, ca 1900

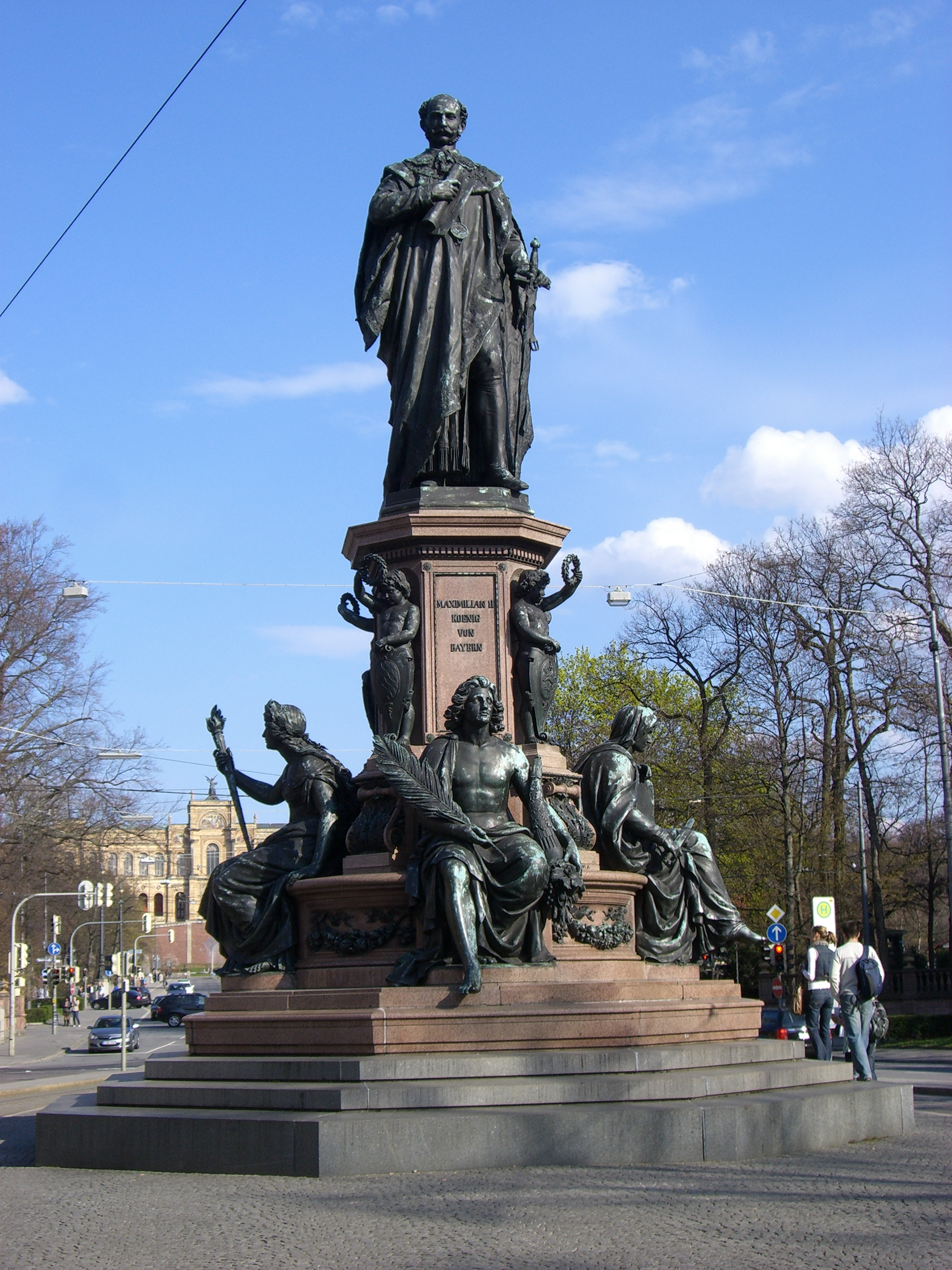
The Maxmonument, Monument of Maximilian II of Bavaria

The Maximilianstraße in Munich is one of the city's four royal avenues next to the Brienner Straße, the Ludwigstraße and the Prinzregentenstraße. It starts at Max-Joseph-Platz, where the Residenz and the National Theatre are situated, and runs east–west. Planned and begun in 1850 by King Maximilian II of Bavaria, the street takes his name. The lead architect was Friedrich Bürklein. Today, Maximilianstraße has the distinction of the highest retail rents in Germany.

== Architecture ==
With this project, the king also aimed to "invent" a new architectural style which would combine the best features of historical models combined with then modern building technology. The avenue is framed by mostly neo-Gothic buildings influenced by the English Perpendicular style. The opening in the middle of the Maximilianstraße for the new circular road Altstadtring after World War II nowadays disturbs the appearance.

Opposite to the National Theatre the north facade of the Old Mint Yard got its neogothic decoration when the Maximilianstraße was built to fit it with the concept of this royal avenue. The new buildings house, among others, in the western portion of the street the Schauspielhaus (built by Max Littmann, 1901) and in the eastern portion several state buildings like the building of the district government of Upper Bavaria (Friedrich Bürklein, 1856–1864), the Museum Fünf Kontinente (Museum of Ethnology, built by Eduard Riedel, 1858–1865) and the building of the Wilhelmsgymnasium (built by Carl Leimbach, 1875–1877).

Between the district government building and the museums are monuments for Deroy (1856), Rumford (1866), Schelling (1861) and Fraunhofer (1868). The Maxmonument in the middle of the eastern part of the avenue is dedicated to King Maximilian II of Bavaria and was sculpted by Kaspar von Zumbusch (1875). In the south of the monument the nearby dome of St. Lukas is visible.

After crossing the river Isar further east, the avenue circles the palatial Maximilianeum (Friedrich Bürklein, 1857–1874), home of a gifted students´ foundation and the Bavarian Landtag (state parliament). Due to statical problems at the bank of river Isar the construction was only completed ten years after the King's death and the facade of the building which was originally planned also in neo-Gothic style had to be altered in neo-Renaissance. The Maximiliansbridge with the statue of Pallas Athene was built in the years 1857–1863 as an extension of Maximilianstraße to the Maximilianeum, and broadened in 1903.

== Shopping street ==
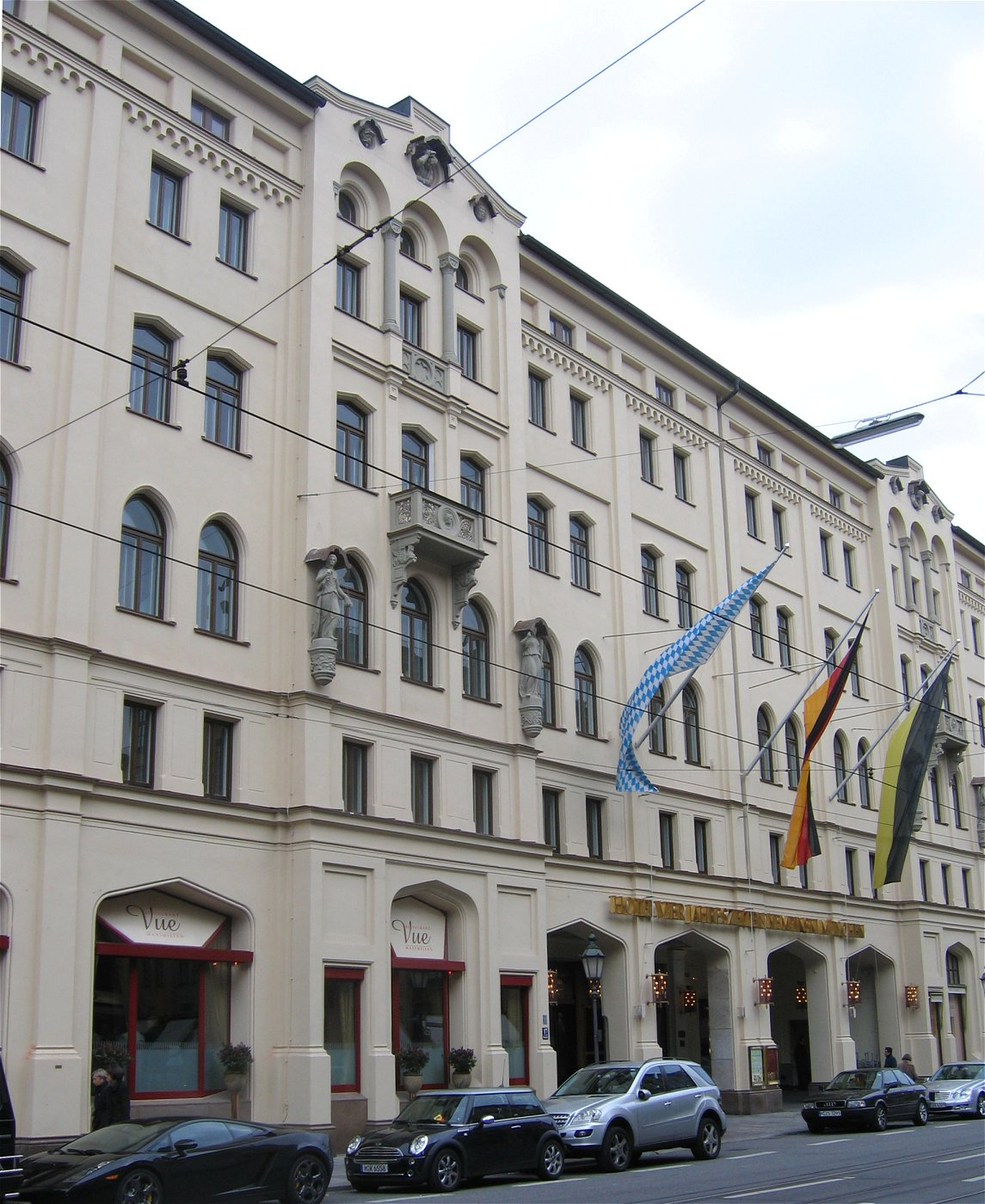
Hotel Vier Jahreszeiten Kempinski

The western portion of Maximilianstraße is known for its galleries, designer shops, luxury boutiques, jewellery stores, and one of Munich's foremost five-star hotels, the Hotel Vier Jahreszeiten (Kempinski, built by Rudolf Gottgetreu, 1856–1858).

Dolce & Gabbana, Versace, Louis Vuitton, Dior, Chanel, Escada, Hugo Boss, Gucci, Gianfranco Ferré, Bulgari and many other famous shops keep branches in the Maximilianstraße. They have increasingly ousted the traditional shops, art galleries and restaurants.
