= Steinholding (sport) =

Steinholding as a sport

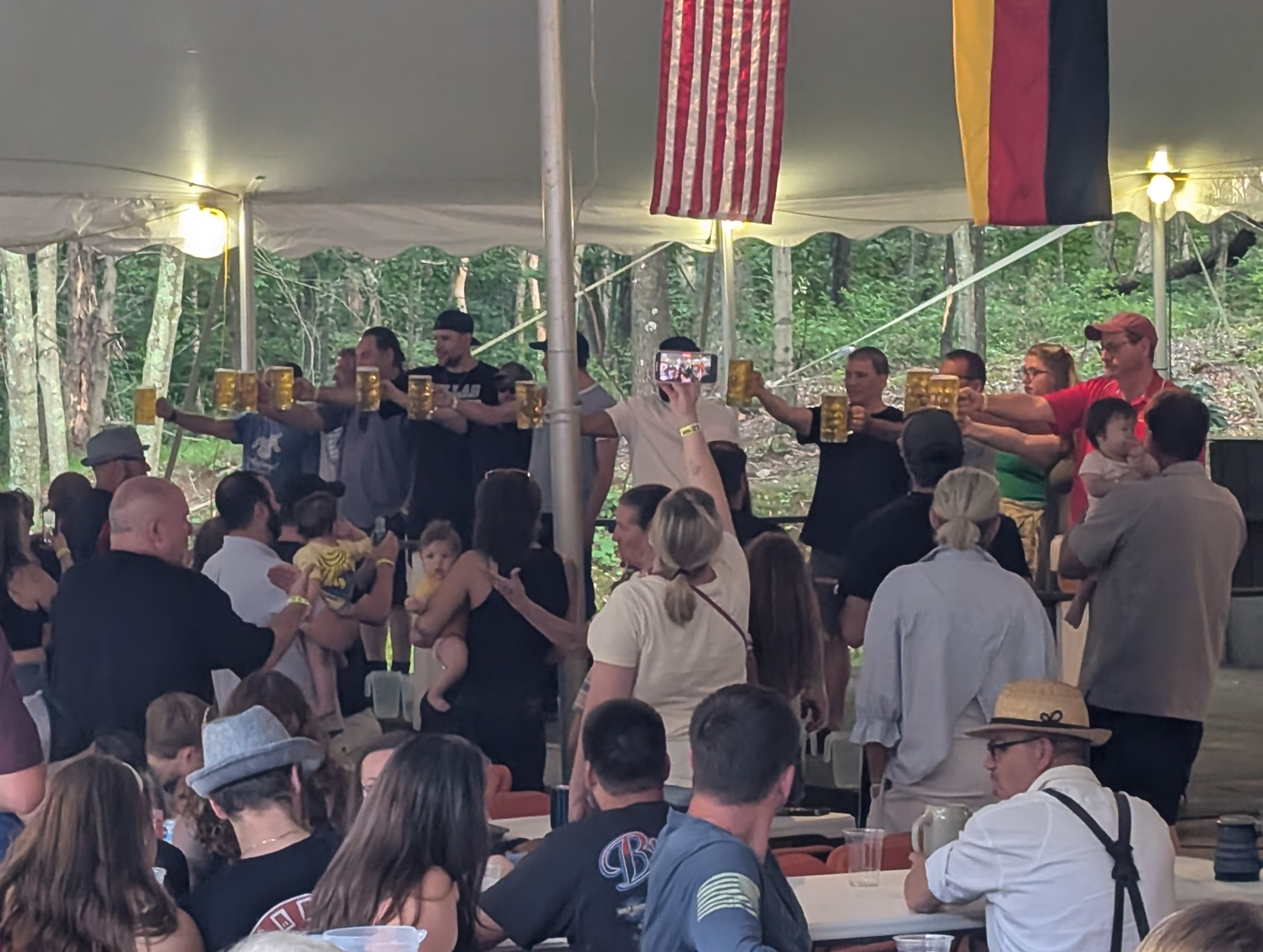
A Maßkrugstemmen event

Steinholding, also known as Masskrugstemmen, is a traditional Bavarian strength and endurance contest where competitors hold a full one-liter beer stein, weighing five pounds. The goal is to hold the stein out in front of the body with a straight arm for as long as possible without bending the elbow or spilling any beer. The competitor who can hold their stein with proper form for the longest duration is the winner.

The U.S. Steinholding Association regulates the sport in the U.S. It provides the official rules, training tips, and sanctions competitions across the country.

== Background ==
Steinholding made its way to the United States with German immigrants where it has become a mainstay at many Oktoberfest events. The growing popularity of the sport led to the creation of the U.S. Steinholding Association as the governing body of the sport. Founded in 2015, the U.S. Steinholding Association holds annual state championships across the United States. In 2025, the organization announced its inaugural national championship event in Cincinnati, Ohio. Eben Caldwell, of Ohio, set the state record of Ohio at The Winking Lizard on September 24th, 2026.

== Competition rules ==
Competitors must use a one-liter dimpled glass stein with a handle, also known as Masskrug. An empty one-liter stein weighs approximately three pounds. When filled with liquid up to the one-liter line, the total weight is approximately five pounds.

The stein must be gripped by the handle in a fist. The thumb may not rest on top of the stein handle. The front of the stein must face directly away from the competition, extending parallel with the arm. The use of gloves, grip powders, pine tar, or similar substances is prohibited.

A three strike rule is implemented if competitors bend their elbow, rest the thumb on top of the stein handle, lean excessively, or hold the stein higher than parallel to the ground.

Competitors are immediately disqualified if any amount of beer or liquid from the stein is spilled, the stein is set down, hands are switched, or the stein is touched with the other hand.
