= Maximilianeum =

Building housing the Bavarian Parliament in Munich, Germany

Coordinates: 48.136°N 11.594°E

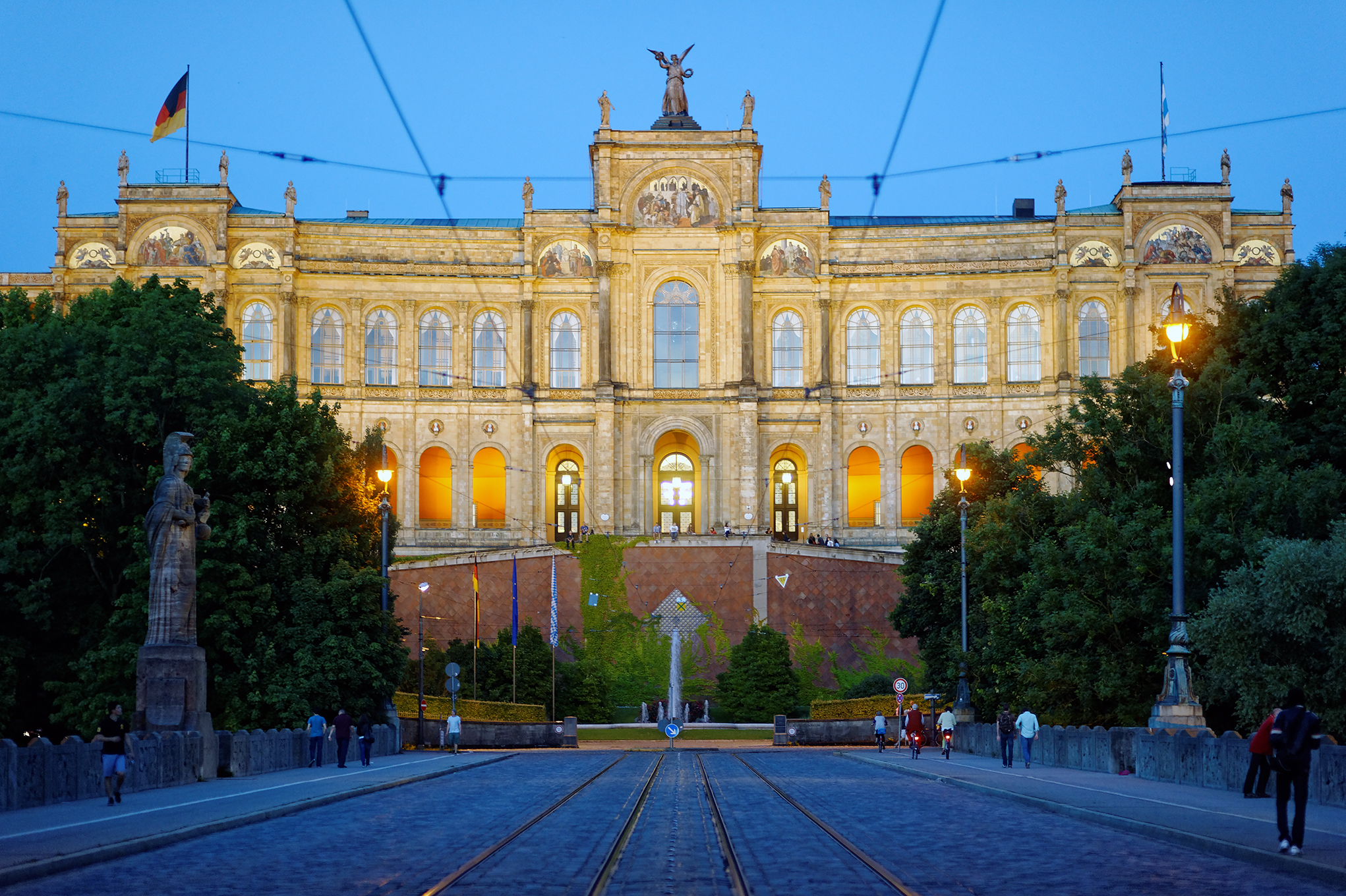
The Maximilianeum Building 2012

The Maximilianeum, a palatial building in Munich, was built as the home of a gifted students' foundation but since 1949 has also housed the Bavarian State Parliament.

== History ==
The Maximilianeum was initially an educational foundation set up by King Maximilian II of Bavaria in 1852 to prepare gifted students for the civil service. Construction of the building was the initiative of King Maximilian II in 1857, with Friedrich Bürklein the lead architect.

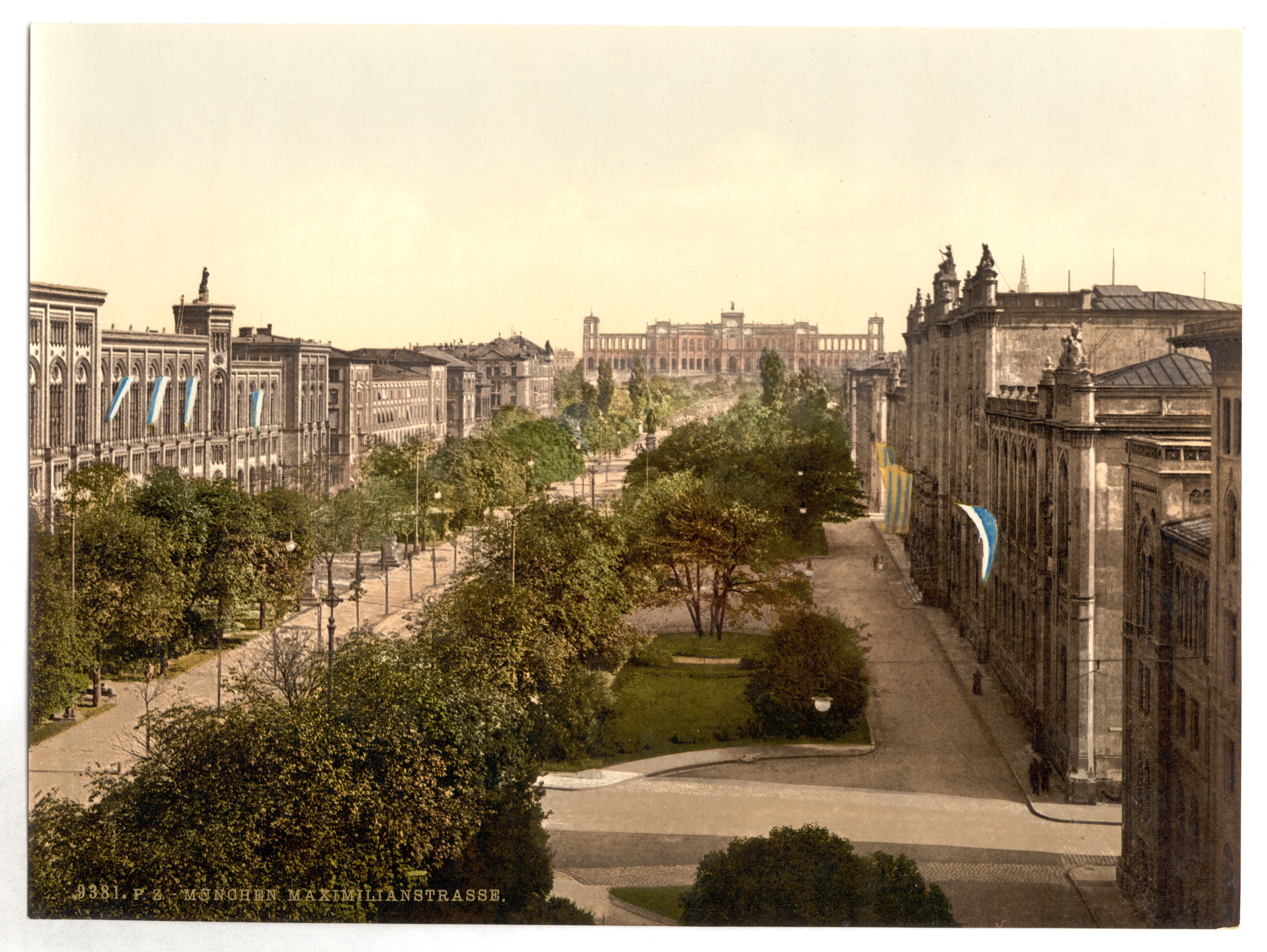
Maximilian Street and Maximilianeum (between 1890 and 1900)

The Maximilianeum sits grandly and as a focal point on the bank of the Isar River above Maximilian Bridge at the eastern end of Maximilianstrasse, a royal avenue dotted with Neo-Gothic palaces influenced by the English Perpendicular style.

Weight problems delayed completion until 1874, and the façade, which had been conceived as Neo-Gothic, needed to be altered; Gottfried Semper was entrusted with the adjustments, resulting in the final quasi-Renaissance appearance decorated with arches, columns, mosaics, and niches filled with busts. Until 1918, it also housed a "historical gallery" and the royal page school.

The building was significantly damaged by bombing during the Second World War, but was rebuilt.

== Maximilianeum foundation ==
The foundation still exists. Each year six to eight male students receive scholarships, free room and board at the Maximilianeum, and the opportunity to study abroad and take part in language courses. In 1980, Albrecht, Duke of Bavaria established a comparable scholarship for female students. The Maximilianeum has an exchange program with Balliol College, Oxford.

== Bavarian parliament ==
The Bavarian state government took up occupancy in 1949. The much less visible rear of the edifice has been extended in motley fashion to provide new parliamentary office space, in 1958, 1964, 1992, and again in 2012, each time with a different architectural approach. In June 2015, the Bavarian Parliament named the entrance hall of the Maximilianeum after Friedrich Bürklein. Periodically exhibitions are hosted.
