= Coat of arms of Munich =

Coat of arms

Munich Free State of Bavaria
Blazon
Small Coat: Argent, a boy monk proper habited in a cowl Sable trimmed Or, his dexter hand in the act of benediction and his sinister hand holding a book Gules Large Coat: Argent, a city gate double-towered Gules the towers with spires barré dancetté Or and Sable, issuing from the battlements a demi-lion rampant crowned Or and standing in the portal a boy monk proper habited in a cowl Sable trimmed Or, his dexter hand in the act of benediction and his sinister hand holding a book Gules
Basic data
Introduction:	13th Century; Royal Seal: 1304
Legal basis:	Main seal: 1239; City council ruling: 1957
Supporting Documents:	11 June 1865: Royal Approval 24 December 1936: Ministerial Resolution 17 December 1957: City council ruling
Alterations:	1808, 1818, 1834, 1865, 1936, 1949
Armiger:	Dieter Reiter, Lord Mayor of Munich
Former municipalities with their own coat:	Au, Aubing, Feldmoching, Milbertshofen, Obermenzing, Pasing, Schwabing, Untermenzing

The coat of arms of Munich (Münchner Wappen) depicts a young monk dressed in black holding a red book. It has existed in a similar form since the 13th century, though at certain points in its history it has not depicted the central figure of the monk at all. As the German name for Munich, München, means Home of Monks, the monk in this case is a self-explanatory symbol (canting arms) who represents the city of Munich.

Appearing on a document of 28 May 1239, the oldest seal of Munich has a picture of a monk wearing an open hood. While all seal impressions show the monk with the book in one hand and three outstretched fingers in the other, the monk has varied slightly, appearing in profile, then later full-faced and bare-headed. By the 19th century the figure was portrayed as youthful and became known as the Münchner Kindl or Munich Child. The coat of arms in its current form was created in 1957 and is still an important symbol of the Bavarian state capital.

== The Monk ==
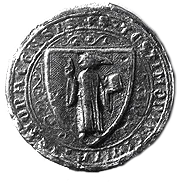
Small seal, 1304

As the German name for Munich, i.e. München, means "of Monks", the monk in this case is a self-explanatory symbol who represents the city of Munich. The figure is portrayed wearing a golden trimmed black cowl with a black hood and red shoes. The right hand is raised and the left carries a red book.

The open right hand of the monk is interpreted as an oath-making gesture, or a blessing gesture in Christian tradition. The red book in the left hand refers to the oath book of the city (in accordance with the gesture of the right hand), or the municipal law book which is bounded in red and has been handed down since 1365. Another interpretation is that it is a gospel book.

When the Munich town administration developed a constitution of its council, a seal was necessary for the purposes of asserting the authenticity of town-council documents. Appearing on a document of May 28, 1239, the oldest seal of Munich has a picture of a monk wearing an open hood. While all seal impressions show the monk with the book in one hand and three outstretched fingers in the other, the monk has varied slightly, appearing in profile, then later full-faced and bare-headed. The monk as a sole heraldic figure can be found on a seal dating from the year 1304, and on flags of the city since the middle of the 14th century. Colourful representations of the town's coat of arms stem from the 15th century.

=== Münchner Kindl ===
In the course of the few centuries up until the current version of 1957, the coat of arms has undergone some distinctly visible changes. While some 15th-century portrayals already show a child figure instead of the monk, the monk in representations onwards began to lose its serious disposition, with curly hair and a more youthful-looking face. By the 18th century and especially the 19th century, the monk had been minimised into the Münchner Kindl, Bavarian for Munich Child, a reference to the figure first documented in 1727, although it is not clear when it appeared on the coat of arms for the first time or who coined the term. The transformation was brought about by artists such as sculptors and painters as well as copper and seal engravers, as opposed to a legal order.

In the second half of the nineteenth century, local artists also supplemented the figure with items such as radishes, pretzels, laurel wreaths and foaming beer steins. The symbol diversely appears in numerous places such as on manhole covers, beer steins and the top of the tower of the town hall. While the symbol as a man through being a monk was previously clear, its gender has become ambiguous since being designated the Kindl. One interpretation is that it is simply genderless, however in the 1920s a female inclination became apparent, and portrayals in person are to this day by young women.

== History ==
The Munich coat of arms is verifiable from seals in 1239 and 1268. These seals show a monk in a gate, above which is an eagle, referring to the Bishop of Freising. The city belonged to him and this was probably derived from his coat of arms. From 1313, the city was in possession of the Wittelsbach Dukes and the eagle was replaced with a lion, a symbol of the old Bavarian and Palatine Wittelsbachs since the Fiefdom of Duke Ludwig in 1214.

=== Coat of arms after ratification by Max I. Joseph ===
In 1808, King Maximilian I Joseph granted the city a historicist city emblem depicting a classical portal, atop which the King's crown lies. A golden lion sits in the gate's threshold with a sword in one paw and a shield with the letter "M" in the other. As an enlightened monarch, Max I. Joseph wanted the city's symbol to show its culture and at the same time dispel the stereotype of the "Mönchsbarbarei", or the barbarianism of the monks. However, the township decided against the complete elimination of the historical reference to the monk and thus in 1818 the M was replaced with the previous monk's head design.

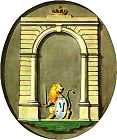
1808–1818

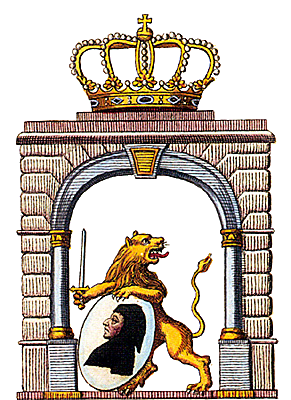
1818–1835

=== Coat of arms after ratification by Ludwig I ===
In 1834, King Ludwig I granted the city its old coat of arms again in the form of large and small crests. These embodied the small crest seal of 1304 and the large one of 1323. The 1835 coat of arms had a blue background, though this was later corrected to argent under Ludwig II in 1865. The background was rarely changed. One example of its occurrence, however, was when or was used in the 16th century instead.

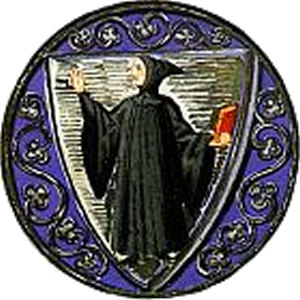
1835–1865
Small Coat of arms

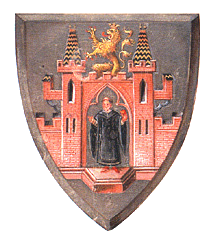
1865–1936
1949–1957
Large Coat of arms

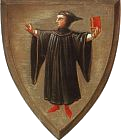
1865–1936
1949–1957
Small Coat of arms

=== Coat of arms in the Third Reich ===
From 1936 to 1945, the lion was once again replaced by an eagle, only this time that of the Nazi party, the Reichsadler. Deemed the Hauptstadt der Bewegung (Capital of the Movement), Munich was a significant place in terms of the Nazi ideology. The city was home to the NSDAP headquarters, the Beer Hall Putsch and also saw the establishment of Dachau, the first Nazi concentration camp. Post-war designs were not pursued until 1949.

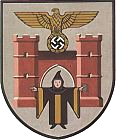
1936–1945

=== New coat of arms ===
Both a small and large coat of arms existed from 1949 until 1957 based on representations of them prior to 1936. In 1957 both the large and small city coat of arms were newly arranged by the designer Eduard Ege. At the same time, the city council set the resolution on the December 17, 1957 that the large one was no longer for official use but only for particular representative purposes.

1957 to today,
large coat of arms
used only for special occasions.

1957 to today,
small coat of arms,
officially used version.

== See also ==
- Coat of arms of Germany
- Coat of arms of Bavaria

== Bibliography ==
- K. Stadler: Deutsche Wappen – Bundesrepublik Deutschland. Angelsachsen Verlag 1964–1971. 8th Volume.
