= Flutie =

Flutie may refer to the following:

- Doug Flutie (b. 1962), a retired American football and Canadian football quarterback who played in both the NFL and the CFL.
  - Hail Flutie, a famous college football game between Boston College and the University of Miami on 23 November 1984, in which Doug Flutie threw an unlikely pass to win the game for Boston College.
  - Flutie Effect, a phenomenon whereby a successful sports team increases the prominence of a university, in reference to a large increase in applications to Boston College in the year following the "Hail Flutie" game.
  - Flutie Flakes, a brand of cereal created in 1998 during Doug Flutie's first season with the Buffalo Bills.
  - Flutie Fruities, a brand of fruit snacks created in 2001 during Doug Flutie's first season with the San Diego Chargers.
- Darren Flutie (b. 1966), a retired Canadian football wide receiver who played in the CFL, and the brother of Doug Flutie.
- Principal Robert "Bob" Flutie, a minor character in the first season of Buffy the Vampire Slayer, played by Ken Lerner.
- Tuttie Flutie, a 1980 jazz album recorded by the Toshiko Akiyoshi Trio with a flute quartet
