= Doug Flutie =

American football player (born 1962)

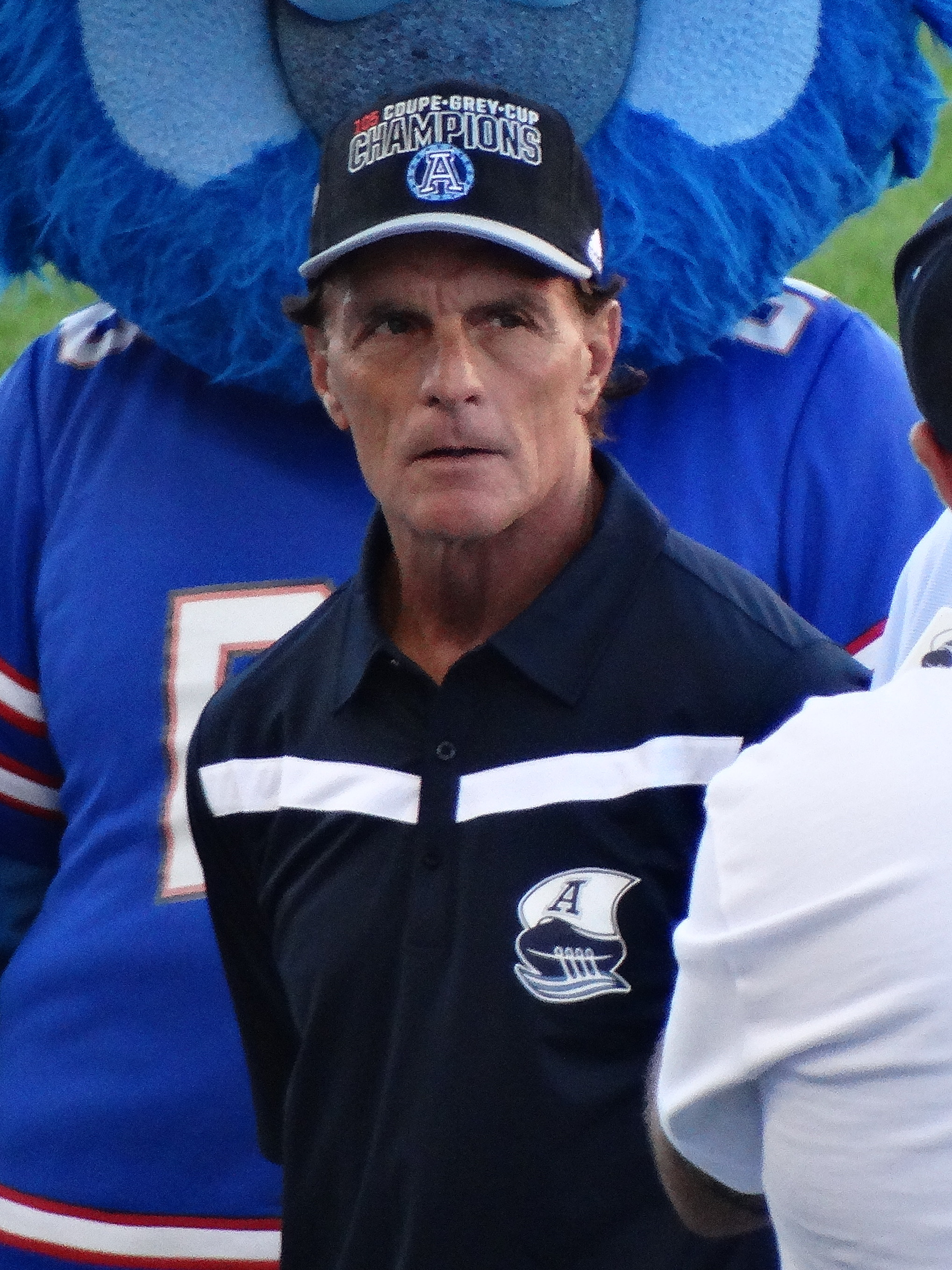
- Flutie in 2025

No. 22, 2, 20, 7
- Position: Quarterback

Personal information
- Born: October 23, 1962 (age 64); Manchester, Maryland, U.S.
- Listed height: 5 ft 10 in (1.78 m)
- Listed weight: 180 lb (82 kg)

Career information
- High school: Natick (Natick, Massachusetts)
- College: Boston College (1981–1984)
- NFL draft: 1985: 11th round, 285th overall pick

Career history
- New Jersey Generals (1985); Chicago Bears (1986–1987); New England Patriots (1987–1989); BC Lions (1990–1991); Calgary Stampeders (1992–1995); Toronto Argonauts (1996–1997); Buffalo Bills (1998–2000); San Diego Chargers (2001–2004); New England Patriots (2005)

Awards and highlights
- 3× Grey Cup champion (1992, 1996, 1997); 3× Grey Cup MVP (1992, 1996, 1997); NFL Comeback Player of the Year (1998); Pro Bowl (1998); 6× CFL's Most Outstanding Player (1991–1994, 1996, 1997); 4× Jeff Nicklin Memorial Trophy (1991–1994); 2× Terry Evanshen Trophy (1996, 1997); 6× CFL All-Star (1991–1994, 1996, 1997); Heisman Trophy (1984); Unanimous All-American (1984); Second-team All-American (1983); 2× First-team All-East (1983, 1984); Second-team All-East (1982); Boston College Eagles No. 22 retired; CFL records: Most passing yards in a season: 6,619 (1991); Most passing touchdowns in a season: 48 (1994)

Career NFL statistics
- Passing attempts: 2,151
- Passing completions: 1,177
- Completion percentage: 54.7%
- TD–INT: 86–68
- Passing yards: 14,715
- Passer rating: 76.3
- Rushing yards: 1,634
- Rushing touchdowns: 10
- Stats at Pro Football Reference

Career CFL statistics
- Passing attempts: 4,854
- Passing completions: 2,975
- Completion percentage: 61.3%
- TD–INT: 270–155
- Passing yards: 41,355
- Stats at CFL.ca (archived)
- Canadian Football Hall of Fame
- College Football Hall of Fame

Douglas Richard Flutie (born October 23, 1962) is an American former football quarterback who played professionally for 21 seasons. Flutie played 12 seasons in the National Football League (NFL), eight seasons in the Canadian Football League (CFL), and one season in the United States Football League (USFL). He played college football for the Boston College Eagles, winning the Heisman Trophy in 1984 amid a season that saw him throw a game-winning touchdown pass in the final seconds of a ranked matchup against the Miami Hurricanes. Flutie chose to begin his professional career with the USFL's New Jersey Generals; his unavailability to NFL teams resulted in him being selected 285th overall by the Los Angeles Rams in the 11th round of the 1985 NFL draft, the lowest drafting of a Heisman winner. After the USFL folded, Flutie spent his first four NFL seasons with the Chicago Bears and New England Patriots.

Flutie left the NFL in 1990 for the CFL, where he became regarded as one of the league's greatest players. As a member of the BC Lions, Calgary Stampeders, and Toronto Argonauts, he was named the CFL's Most Outstanding Player a record six times and won three Grey Cups. In all three of his championship victories, two with the Argonauts and one with the Stampeders, he was named Grey Cup MVP.

After his CFL success, Flutie returned to the NFL in 1998 with the Buffalo Bills, earning Pro Bowl and NFL Comeback Player of the Year honors for leading Buffalo to the playoffs. Flutie again helped the Bills obtain a playoff berth the following season, but was controversially benched in their subsequent Wild Card defeat. He would be the last quarterback to lead the Bills to the playoffs for the next 17 years. Flutie held his last starting role with the San Diego Chargers in 2001 and spent his final season in 2005 as a backup for the Patriots. He was inducted to the College Football Hall of Fame in 2007 and the Canadian Football Hall of Fame in 2008. Flutie was also inducted to Canada's Sports Hall of Fame in 2007, becoming the first non-Canadian inductee.

== Early life ==
Flutie was born in Manchester, Maryland, to Dick and Joan Flutie. His paternal great-grandparents were Lebanese immigrants. His family moved to Melbourne Beach, Florida, when he was six, where his father worked as a quality engineer in the aerospace industry. While there, Flutie led Hoover Junior High School's football team to two Brevard County Championships.

After the dramatic slow-down of the space program in the mid-1970s, the Flutie family again moved in 1976 to Natick, Massachusetts, 20 miles west of Boston. Flutie graduated from Natick High School, where he was an All-League performer in football, basketball, and baseball.

== College career ==
Flutie played football at Boston College, the only Division I-A school to recruit him, from 1981 to 1984, and won the Heisman Trophy, Maxwell Award, and Davey O'Brien Award in his senior year (1984). Flutie became the first quarterback to win the Heisman since Pat Sullivan in 1971. Flutie left school as the NCAA's all-time passing yardage leader with 10,579 yards and was a unanimous All-American as a senior. He earned Player of the Year awards from UPI, Kodak, The Sporting News, and the Maxwell Football Club. The quarterback coach for Boston College from 1981 to 1983 was Tom Coughlin.

Flutie gained national attention in 1984 when he led the Eagles to victory in a high-scoring, back-and-forth game against the Miami Hurricanes (led by quarterback Bernie Kosar). The game was nationally televised on CBS the day after Thanksgiving and thus had a huge audience. The Hurricanes staged a dramatic drive to take the lead, 45–41, in the closing minute of the game. The Eagles then took possession at its own 22-yard line with 28 seconds to go. After two passes moved the ball another 30 yards, only 6 seconds remained. On the last play of the game, Flutie scrambled away from the defense and threw a "Hail Mary pass" that was caught in the end zone by his college roommate, Gerard Phelan, giving the Eagles a 47–45 win. Flutie led the nation in passer rating and won the Heisman Trophy a week later, but the voting had finished before the game; Flutie said, however, that "without the Hail Mary pass I think I could have been very, very easily forgotten". The subsequent rise in applications for admission to Boston College after Flutie's "Hail Mary" gave rise to the admissions phenomenon known as the "Flutie effect". This idea essentially states that a winning sports team can increase the recognition value of a school enough to make it more attractive to potential applicants.

In addition to his collegiate athletic achievement, Flutie maintained a distinguished academic record at Boston College, where he majored in communication and computer science. Flutie was a candidate for the Rhodes Scholarship, for which he was named a finalist in 1984. Upon graduating, Flutie won the National Football Foundation post-graduate scholarship.

In November 2008, Flutie was honored by Boston College with a statue outside Alumni Stadium; it depicts his "Hail Mary" pass. His number, 22, has been retired by the Boston College football program. In 2013, Flutie received the College Football Legacy Award from The Sports Museum at TD Garden for his accomplishments at Boston College.

== Professional career ==
=== New Jersey Generals ===
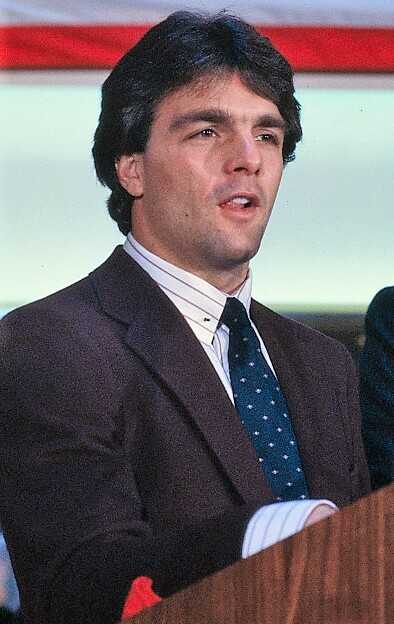
Doug Flutie at the Generals football press conference in February 1985

Despite Flutie's college achievements, some considered him too small to play professional football. When asked on television "Can a guy who's five-foot-nine, 175 pounds make it in the pros?", he answered, "Yes, he can. But it's a matter of ability and not size. I feel I can play; I don't know for sure, and those questions will be answered in the future."

Flutie was attractive to the USFL, which was desperate for a star to reinvigorate the league as it was in financial difficulty. Meanwhile, the Buffalo Bills, who had the first pick in the 1985 NFL draft, still had the rights to Jim Kelly (who had spurned them to go to the USFL) and also had concerns about Flutie's height. He was selected by the USFL's New Jersey Generals in the 1985 territorial draft, which took place in January, months before the 1985 NFL Draft. Flutie went through negotiations with the Generals and agreed on a deal that would make him the highest paid pro football player and highest paid rookie in any sport with $7 million over five years; Flutie was signed on February 4, 1985. Having already signed with the USFL, Flutie was not selected in the NFL draft until the 11th round as the 285th overall pick by the Los Angeles Rams.

Flutie entered the USFL with much hype and fanfare. In February 1985, Flutie made his USFL debut against the Orlando Renegades. His debut was not impressive, as his first two professional passes were intercepted by Renegades linebacker Jeff Gabrielsen. The only two touchdowns that New Jersey scored came from turnovers by Orlando quarterback Jerry Golsteyn. By the time Flutie's debut was over, he completed 7 of 18 passes for a total of 174 yards, while also running for 51 yards. Flutie completed 134 of 281 passes for 2,109 yards and 13 touchdowns with the Generals in 1985 in 15 games. He suffered an injury late in the season that saw him turn over the reins to reserve quarterback Ron Reeves. The Generals went on to finish with an 11–7 record and a second-place finish in the USFL's Eastern Conference. The USFL folded in 1986, and Flutie and punter Sean Landeta were the league's last active players in the NFL.

=== Chicago Bears ===
On October 14, 1986, the Los Angeles Rams traded their rights to Flutie to the Chicago Bears in exchange for multiple draft picks. Flutie appeared in four games for the 1986 Chicago Bears, who were in need for quarterback play when Jim McMahon suffered a season-ending injury late in the season. He served as the starter in the Divisional Round game against Washington, which was only his second NFL start. He went 11-of-31 with 134 yards as Washington scored 20 unanswered points in the second half to overcome a halftime deficit while Flutie's interception in the third quarter set up Washington for a subsequent touchdown.

=== New England Patriots (first stint) ===
Chicago then traded Flutie to the New England Patriots at the start of the 1987 NFL season, a season which saw the NFL Players Association go on strike, and NFL games subsequently being played by replacement players. Flutie crossed the picket lines in order to play for the Patriots, one of many NFL players to rejoin their respective teams, and the strike quickly collapsed.

On October 2, 1988, after the Patriots began the season with a 1–3 record, Flutie came off the bench to lead a comeback victory over the Indianapolis Colts in Foxborough, scoring the winning touchdown on a 13-yard bootleg at the end of the fourth quarter. He then led the team to a 6–3 record, including wins at home over the eventual division winning Cincinnati Bengals and Chicago Bears. However, on December 11, after taking the Patriots to the brink of the playoffs, Flutie was benched by head coach Raymond Berry and replaced with Tony Eason, who had not played football in over a year; Berry cited a need for more "explosive" play from the offense, which Flutie pointed out had thrown little to begin with. New England lost the last game of the year in Denver and were eliminated from the postseason in a tiebreaker.

Flutie was released by the Patriots after playing the 1989 season in a mainly backup role. No other NFL teams showed interest in Flutie and he subsequently signed to play for the Canadian Football League (CFL). After his release from the Patriots, they won only nine games over the following three seasons.

=== BC Lions ===
In 1990, Flutie began his eight-year CFL career. That year, he signed with the BC Lions for a two-year contract reportedly worth $350,000 a season. At the time, he was the highest paid player in the CFL. Flutie struggled in his first season, which would be his only losing season in the CFL.

The 1991 season saw Flutie set several CFL single season records:

- passing attempts (730)
- passing completions (466)
- passing yards (6,619)
- 300-yard passing games (14)
- 400-yard passing games (7)
- rushing touchdowns by a quarterback (14)

On October 12 vs Edmonton, Flutie threw for 582 yards, which was second most in a regular season game at the time. He also won the most games for a starting quarterback that year (11). For his accomplishments, he won Most Outstanding Player award for the first time. BC made the playoffs for the first time since 1988, but ultimately lost to the eventual West Division Champion Calgary Stampeders in the West Semi-Final.

=== Calgary Stampeders ===
In 1992, Flutie was rewarded with a reported million-dollar salary from the Calgary Stampeders. He quarterbacked Calgary to a league-best 13 regular season wins, won his second Most Outstanding Player award, and won his first Grey Cup. In the Grey Cup game, Flutie was 33 of 49 for 480 passing yards. All three statistics were the second highest all-time for a single Grey Cup game. For his efforts, he was named the Grey Cup MVP.

In 1993, Flutie quarterbacked Calgary to a 10–0 start, with the team ultimately finishing with a league-best 15–3. He passed for 6,000 yards for the second time in his career, and set a single season record for passing touchdowns with 44. He also tied his 1991 CFL record for 400-yard passing games in a season (7), and set the CFL record for consecutive 400-yard passing games (5). Flutie won his third consecutive Most Outstanding Player award. Calgary ultimately lost in the West Division Final to the visiting Edmonton Eskimos, which eliminated the Stampeders from playing in the Grey Cup that was to be played in Calgary the following Sunday.

The 1994 season saw Calgary once again finishing with a league-best 15–3 record. Flutie broke his CFL record from the previous season for passing touchdowns in a single season with 48. He also rushed for 760 yards, which was his best rushing season in the CFL. Against the Hamilton Tiger-Cats on October 30, he completed the longest pass of his career (106 yards), a touchdown to Pee Wee Smith. Flutie won his fourth consecutive Most Outstanding Player award. Calgary lost the West Division Final once again, this time to the visiting BC Lions, who defeated the Stampeders with a last play touchdown.

In 1995, Flutie missed several games due to injury. During this time, Jeff Garcia, who later went on to start for the NFL's San Francisco 49ers, started games at quarterback, and helped Calgary once again finish 15–3. The Stampeders advanced to the Grey Cup game, and Flutie started. However, Calgary was defeated by the Baltimore Stallions, the first American-based team to win the Grey Cup.

=== Toronto Argonauts ===
Flutie joined the Toronto Argonauts for the 1996 season, and they went a league-best 15–3. He won the Most Outstanding Player award for the fifth time in his career, and quarterbacked the team to a Grey Cup victory in The Snow Bowl held in Hamilton, Ontario. He won his second Grey Cup MVP award.

After a league-best 15–3 regular season in 1997, Toronto was successful in its quest to win back-to-back Grey Cups when the team won the 1997 Grey Cup held in Edmonton, Alberta. With Flutie at quarterback, the Argonauts set a record for most consecutive completions in a Grey Cup game with 10, which occurred between the first and second quarters. From the late second quarter to the fourth quarter, this record was rewritten when Flutie completed 12 consecutive passes. For his performance in the Grey Cup, he won his third Grey Cup MVP award.

Prior to his final two Grey Cup victories with the Argonauts, Flutie was hampered by the opinion, supported by the media, that he was a quarterback who could not win in cold weather. In both 1993 and 1994, the Stampeders had the best record in the league, but lost the Western Final each year at home in freezing conditions. After first refusing to wear gloves in freezing temperatures, in later years, Flutie adapted to throwing with gloves in cold weather.

Flutie credits his time in the CFL with helping him develop as a pro quarterback. Flutie specifically states that he modeled his game off of fellow CFL quarterback Damon Allen.

Upon completion of his CFL career, Flutie had set numerous CFL career records:

- 5,000+ yard passing seasons (6)
- consecutive 5,000+ yard passing seasons (4)
- 6,000+ passing yards in a season twice in a career (also a pro football record)
- 300-yard passing games (74)
- 400-yard passing games in a career (29)
- 6 Most Outstanding Player awards

Flutie ranked third in the following all-time regular season CFL passing categories: yards (41,355), touchdowns (270), completions (2,975), and he ranked fourth in all-time attempts (4,854). In all-time Grey Cup passing categories, Flutie held the record for most attempts (171), completions (108), and yards (1,421).

Other passing accomplishments upon completion of his CFL career included:

- leading the CFL in yards five times in only eight seasons
- holding four of the CFL's top five highest single-season completion marks
- holding three of the CFL's top five highest single-season yardage marks
- holding the top three single-season touchdown marks
- gaining 9,500+ yards for three different CFL franchises
- setting the single season individual records for three different CFL franchises in attempts, completions, yards, and touchdowns:

	Attempts	Completions	Yards	Touchdowns
BC	730 (1991)	466 (1991)	6,619 (1991)	38 (1991)
Calgary	703 (1993)	416 (1993)	6,092 (1993)	48 (1994)
Toronto	677 (1996)	*434 (1996)	5,720 (1996)	47 (1997)

*since surpassed

On November 17, 2006, Flutie was named the greatest Canadian Football League player of all time from a top 50 list of CFL players conducted by TSN. In 2007, he was named to Canada's Sports Hall of Fame, the first non-Canadian to be inducted.

=== Buffalo Bills ===
The Buffalo Bills' then-pro personnel director A. J. Smith convinced the organization that Flutie would be a great asset to the team, and the Bills signed him in the 1998 offseason. The Bills' attempt at making Todd Collins their starting quarterback was a failure, and Flutie was one of two quarterbacks, the other being Rob Johnson (the presumptive starter), to join the Bills in the 1998 offseason. In his first action with the Bills, Flutie entered for an injured Johnson and threw two touchdowns while leading a fourth-quarter comeback against the Indianapolis Colts on October 11, 1998. The following week, Flutie made his first NFL start since October 15, 1989, against the unbeaten Jacksonville Jaguars. The nine-year gap between starts for a quarterback in the NFL is the third-longest in duration behind Tommy Maddox (December 12, 1992, to October 6, 2002) and the man Flutie replaced, Todd Collins (December 14, 1997, to December 16, 2007). Flutie was the hero of the Bills' victory as he scored the winning touchdown against the Jaguars by rolling out on a bootleg and into the end zone on a fourth-down play in the waning seconds. The Bills' success continued with Flutie at the helm; his record as a starter that season was 8 wins and 3 losses. He then threw for 360 yards in a wild card playoff loss at Miami. Flutie was selected to play in the 1998 Pro Bowl and is currently the shortest quarterback to make the Pro Bowl since 1970.

Flutie led the Bills to an 11–5 record in 1999 (10–5 with Flutie as the starter; he was rested for the final game of the season after the Bills clinched a playoff berth). In a controversial decision which football analyst Aaron Schatz said was "the wrong decision on one of the most mismatched quarterback controversies of all time", Flutie was replaced by Johnson for the playoffs by coach Wade Phillips, who later said he was ordered by Bills owner Ralph Wilson to do so. Johnson completed only ten passes, none for touchdowns, and was sacked six times, as the Bills lost 22–16 to the eventual AFC Champion Tennessee Titans. The game has become known as the Music City Miracle, as the Titans scored on the penultimate play of the game—a kickoff return following the Bills' apparent game-clinching field goal.

The following season, Flutie was named the Bills' backup and played only late in games or when Johnson was injured, which was often. During the season, Flutie had a 4–1 record as a starter, while Johnson's was 4–7. In a December 24, 2000 game against the Seattle Seahawks, Flutie achieved a perfect passer rating, completing 20 of 25 passes for 366 yards and three touchdowns. After the 2000 season, Bills President Tom Donahoe and head coach Gregg Williams decided to keep Johnson as the starter and cut Flutie.

=== San Diego Chargers ===
In 2001, Flutie signed with the San Diego Chargers, who had gone 1–15 in 2000. After opening 3–0, the Chargers slumped and were 4–2 going into Week 7, when Flutie's Chargers met Rob Johnson's Bills. Flutie prevailed as the new ex-Bill broke a sack attempt and ran 13 yards for the game-winning touchdown. It would be the last win for the Chargers in 2001, as they dropped their last nine games to finish 5–11 and cost head coach Mike Riley his job. (Buffalo finished 3–13 with Johnson and, later, Alex Van Pelt as starters.) Flutie was Drew Brees' backup in 2002. Brees idolized Flutie growing up, and credits Flutie with mentoring him during their time together at San Diego.

In 2003, Flutie replaced a struggling Brees when the Chargers were 1–7. The 41-year-old Flutie became the oldest player to score two rushing touchdowns in a game, the first player over 40 to accomplish that feat. He also became the oldest AFC Offensive Player of the Week, winning the award for the fourth time. On January 2, 2005, the season finale of the 2004 season, Flutie broke Jerry Rice's record set two weeks prior, to become the oldest player ever to score a touchdown, at 42 years and 71 days. Rice was 42 years and 67 days when he made his touchdown. Flutie's record as a starter that year was 2–3. He was released by the Chargers on March 13, 2005.

=== New England Patriots (second stint) ===
Flutie surprised many when he signed with the Patriots instead of the New York Giants. He became the backup behind Tom Brady and played several times at the end of games to take a few snaps. Flutie has a 37–28 record as an NFL starter, including a 22–9 record in home games. Referring to his both his stature and his time in the Canadian Football League, television football commentator John Madden once said, "Inch for inch, Flutie in his prime was the best quarterback of his generation."

In a December 26, 2005 game against the New York Jets, Flutie was sent in late in the game. The Jets also sent in their back-up quarterback, Vinny Testaverde. This was the first time in NFL history that two quarterbacks over the age of 40 competed against each other (Testaverde was 42, Flutie was 43).

In the Patriots' regular-season finale against the Miami Dolphins on January 1, 2006, Flutie successfully drop kicked a football for an extra point, something that had not been done in a regular-season NFL game since 1941. It was Flutie's first kick attempt in the NFL, and earned him that week's title of AFC Special Teams Player of the Week. Patriots head coach Bill Belichick, known for his knowledge of the history of the game, made comments that suggested that the play was a retirement present of sorts for his veteran quarterback, although Flutie made no comment on whether 2005 would be his last season. There is a video of Flutie describing the event in his own words.

During the 2006 off-season, Flutie's agent Kristen Kuliga stated he was interested in returning to the Patriots for another season; as a result, he was widely expected to return, despite his age. However, on May 15, 2006, Flutie announced his decision to "hang up his helmet" at the age of 43 and retire. Flutie was the second-to-last former USFL player to retire, behind Sean Landeta, who last played in the same season of Flutie's retirement (but did not formally retire until 2008).

=== Near-return to the CFL ===
Because of injuries with the Toronto Argonauts, Flutie was contemplating a temporary comeback with the team as of July 25, 2006. Flutie did not plan to play long-term, for he had planned on doing college football commentary on ESPN in the coming season. On August 18, 2006, a story was published on CFL.ca examining this topic in-depth. Flutie was pondering a return to the CFL because of his relationship with Argonauts head coach and former running back Pinball Clemons, and the desire to "say goodbye to the CFL". According to the report, Flutie was poised to return to Toronto on July 22, after their victory over the Saskatchewan Roughriders and the injury to backup quarterback Spergon Wynn. Nevertheless, Flutie chose to stay in retirement.

== Legacy ==
- Holds the professional football record of 6,619 passing yards in a single season.
- Holds the CFL record for most touchdown passes in a season with 48 in 1994.
- Was named the CFL's Most Outstanding Player a record six times (1991–1994 and 1996–1997).
- He remains the only player in pro football history to pass 6,000+ yards in a season twice in his career.
- In 2006, he was named the greatest Canadian Football League player of all time from a top 50 list of CFL players conducted by TSN. In 2007, he was named to Canada's Sports Hall of Fame, the first non-Canadian to be inducted.
- Named to the BC Lions 50th anniversary Dream Team in 2003.
- Inducted into the Calgary Stampeders Wall of Fame in 2008.
- Named to the Toronto Argonauts All-Time Argonauts program/team.
- Is the oldest NFL player to score two rushing touchdowns in a game.
- Is the oldest player to win the AFC Offensive Player of the Week award.
- Flutie has the most rushing yards (212) for any player over 40 years old.
- In football historian Brad Oremland's ranking of the best quarterbacks in history Doug Flutie came in at #31 based on his performances in the NFL as well as his complete dominance of the CFL for years.
- In a 2013 ranking of the best quarterbacks based on age-related performance, sports analyst Neil Paine ranked Doug Flutie 4th best, though he does state that this could be entirely due to Doug Flutie's uniquely demarcated career.
- John Madden said that "Inch for inch, Flutie in his prime was the best quarterback of his generation."

== Career statistics ==
=== College ===
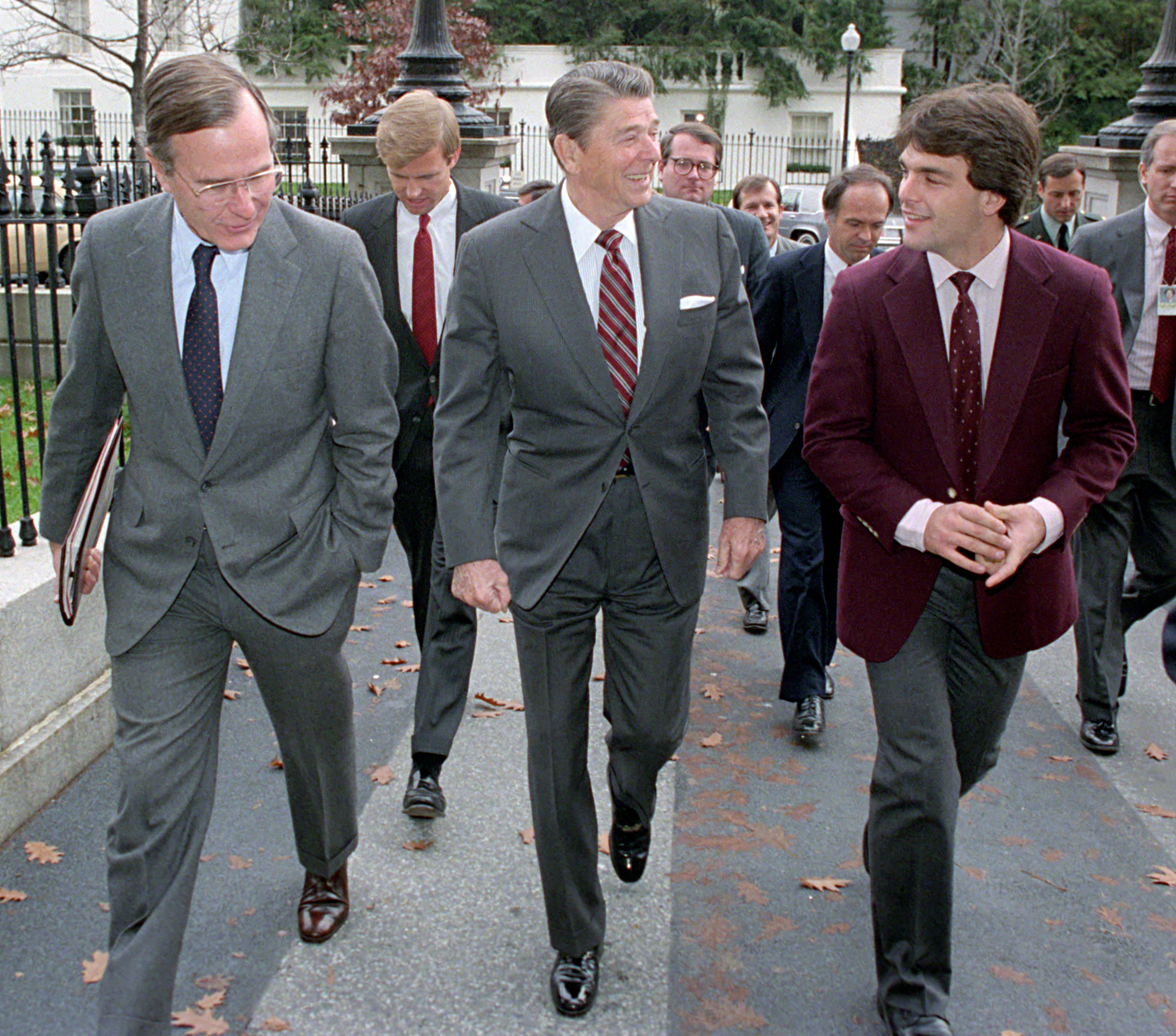
Flutie walking with George H. W. Bush (left) and Ronald Reagan after winning the Heisman Trophy

Year	Team	GP	Passing							Rushing		
Year	Team	GP	Cmp	Att	Pct	Yds	TD	Int	Rtg	Att	Yds	TD
1981	Boston College	11	105	192	54.7	1,652	10	8	135.8	67	79	2
1982	Boston College	12	162	347	46.7	2,749	13	20	114.1	90	265	2
1983	Boston College	12	177	345	51.3	2,724	17	15	125.2	69	245	0
1984	Boston College	12	233	386	60.4	3,454	27	11	152.9	62	149	3
Total		47	677	1,270	53.3	10,579	67	54	132.2	288	738	7

=== USFL ===
Year	Team	Games		Passing								Rushing			
Year	Team	GP	GS	Cmp	Att	Pct	Yds	Avg	TD	Int	Rtg	Att	Yds	Avg	TD
1985	New Jersey Generals	15	15	134	281	47.6	2,109	7.5	13	14	67.8	65	465	7.2	6
Career		15	15	134	281	47.6	2,109	7.5	13	14	67.8	65	465	7.2	6

=== NFL ===
==== Regular season ====
Year	Team	Games			Passing									Rushing					Sacks		Fumbles	
Year	Team	GP	GS	Record	Cmp	Att	Pct	Yds	Avg	Lng	TD	Int	Rtg	Att	Yds	Avg	Lng	TD	Sck	SckY	Fum	Lost
1986	CHI	4	1	1–0	23	46	50.0	361	7.8	58	3	2	80.1	9	36	4.0	19	1	6	30	3	1
1987	CHI	1	0	–	0	0	0.0	0	0.0	0	0	0	0.0	0	0	0.0	0	0	0	0	0	0
1987	NE	1	1	1–0	15	25	60.0	199	8.0	30	1	0	98.6	6	43	7.2	13	0	1	3	1	0
1988	NE	11	9	6–3	92	179	51.4	1,150	6.4	80	8	10	63.3	38	179	4.7	16	1	11	65	3	3
1989	NE	5	3	1–2	36	91	39.6	493	5.4	36	2	4	46.6	16	87	5.4	22	0	6	52	1	1
1998	BUF	13	10	7–3	202	354	57.1	2,711	7.7	84	20	11	87.4	48	248	5.2	23	1	12	78	3	0
1999	BUF	15	15	10–5	264	478	55.2	3,171	6.6	54	19	16	75.1	88	467	5.4	24	1	26	176	6	4
2000	BUF	11	5	4–1	132	231	57.1	1,700	7.4	52	8	3	86.5	36	161	4.5	32	1	10	68	5	2
2001	SD	16	16	5–11	294	521	56.4	3,464	6.6	78	15	18	72.0	53	192	3.6	16	1	25	168	7	2
2002	SD	1	0	–	3	11	27.3	64	5.8	47	0	0	51.3	1	6	6.0	6	0	0	0	0	0
2003	SD	7	5	2–3	91	167	54.5	1,097	6.6	73	9	4	82.8	33	168	5.1	17	2	8	27	7	2
2004	SD	2	1	1–0	20	38	52.6	276	7.3	29	1	0	85.0	5	39	7.8	20	2	1	7	0	0
2005	NE	5	0	–	5	10	50.0	29	2.9	13	0	0	56.2	5	−1	−0.2	2	0	1	13	1	1
Career		91	66	38–28	1,177	2,151	54.7	14,715	6.8	84	86	68	76.3	338	1,634	4.8	32	10	107	687	37	16

==== Postseason ====
Year	Team	Games			Passing									Rushing					Sacks		Fumbles	
Year	Team	GP	GS	Record	Cmp	Att	Pct	Yds	Avg	Lng	TD	Int	Rtg	Att	Yds	Avg	Lng	TD	Sck	SckY	Fum	Lost
1986	CHI	1	1	0–1	11	31	35.5	134	4.3	50	1	2	33.5	2	12	6.0	11	0	1	7	1	1
1998	BUF	1	1	0–1	21	36	58.3	360	10.0	65	1	1	90.0	4	29	7.3	14	0	3	21	2	2
1999	BUF	0	0	–	DNP																	
2004	SD	0	0	–	DNP																	
2005	NE	0	0	–	DNP																	
Career		2	2	0–2	32	67	47.8	494	7.4	65	2	3	63.9	6	41	6.8	14	0	4	28	3	3

=== CFL ===
==== Regular season ====
As of 2026, the CFL lists Flutie with 127 regular-season games started at quarterback and a 94–33 record. His starts came with the BC Lions (28), Calgary Stampeders (63), and Toronto Argonauts (36). 1990 game film indicates that Flutie started 11 games for the BC Lions, with Rickey Foggie starting Games 1 and 4 and Joe Paopao starting Games 6–7, 12–13, and 18. The only Calgary start in question occurred in the 1995 Labour Day Classic against the Edmonton Eskimos, where Flutie was replaced by Jeff Garcia after the opening play. For the purposes of the chart, the starting quarterback record follows the game film, with the credited starter receiving the decision even if replaced after the opening play.

Year	Team	Games			Passing								Rushing			
Year	Team	GD	GS	Record	Cmp	Att	Pct	Yds	Y/A	TD	Int	Rtg	Att	Yds	Avg	TD
1990	BC	16	11	3–8	207	392	52.8	2,960	7.6	16	19	71.0	79	662	8.1	3
1991	BC	18	18	11–7	466	730	63.8	6,619	9.1	38	24	96.7	120	610	5.1	14
1992	CGY	18	18	13–5	396	688	57.5	5,945	8.6	32	30	83.4	96	669	7.0	11
1993	CGY	18	18	15–3	416	703	59.1	6,092	8.7	44	17	98.3	74	373	5.0	11
1994	CGY	18	18	15–3	403	659	59.1	5,726	8.7	48	19	101.5	96	760	7.9	8
1995	CGY	11	10	8–2	223	332	67.1	2,788	8.4	16	5	102.8	46	288	6.3	5
1996	TOR	18	18	15–3	434	677	65.0	5,720	8.4	29	17	94.5	101	756	7.5	9
1997	TOR	18	18	15–3	430	673	63.9	5,505	8.2	47	24	97.8	92	542	5.9	5
Career		135	129	95–34	2,975	4,854	61.3	41,355	8.5	270	155	93.9	704	4,660	6.6	66

==== Postseason ====
Year	Team		Games		Passing					Rushing		
Year	Team		GP	GS	Cmp	Att	Yds	TD	Int	Att	Yds	TD
1991	BC	West Semi-Final	1	1	17	32	257	0	1	9	45	1
1992	CAL	West Final	1	1	13	27	185	0	1	13	94	2
1993	CAL	West Semi-Final	1	1	14	26	145	1	0	11	83	0
1993	CAL	West Final	1	1	22	47	276	0	1	7	44	0
1994	CAL	West Semi-Final	1	1	26	40	359	3	0	5	45	0
1994	CAL	West Final	1	1	24	34	311	1	2	6	84	0
1995	CAL	North Semi-Final	1	1	10	21	131	0	4	5	28	0
1995	CAL	North Final	1	1	21	30	261	1	0	8	50	0
1996	TOR	East Final	1	1	30	38	381	1	0	3	20	2
1997	TOR	East Final	1	1	23	37	398	1	0	6	44	0
Career			10	10	200	332	2,704	8	9	74	532	5

==== Grey Cup ====
Year	Team	Games		Passing					Rushing		
Year	Team	GP	GS	Cmp	Att	Yds	TD	Int	Att	Yds	TD
1992	CAL	1	1	33	49	480	2	0	4	20	0
1995	CAL	1	1	23	48	286	1	1	10	45	1
1996	TOR	1	1	22	35	302	0	0	12	103	1
1997	TOR	1	1	30	38	352	3	1	5	35	1
Career		4	4	108	170	1,420	6	2	31	203	3

== Career highlights ==
NFL

- NFL Comeback Player of the Year (1998)
- Pro Bowl (1998)

CFL

- 3× Grey Cup champion (1992, 1996, 1997)
- 3× Grey Cup MVP (1992, 1996, 1997)
- 6× CFL's Most Outstanding Player (1991–1994, 1996, 1997)
- 4× Jeff Nicklin Memorial Trophy (1991–1994)
- 2× Terry Evanshen Trophy (1996, 1997)
- 6× CFL All-Star (1991–1994, 1996, 1997)
- 4× CFL Western All-Star (1991–1994)
- 2× CFL Eastern All-Star (1996, 1997)
- CFL record most passing yards in a season: 6,619 (1991)
- CFL record most passing touchdowns in a season: 48 (1994)

College

- Heisman Trophy (1984)
- Maxwell Award (1984)
- Walter Camp Award (1984)
- Davey O'Brien Award (1984)
- UPI Player of the Year (1984)
- SN Player of the Year (1984)
- Chic Harley Award (1984)
- Unanimous All-American (1984)
- Second-team All-American (1983)
- NCAA passer rating leader (1984)
- 2× First-team All-East (1983, 1984)
- Second-team All-East (1982)
- Boston College Eagles No. 22 retired

Pro wrestling

- WWE 24/7 Championship (1 time)

Halls of Fame

- In 2007, Flutie was inducted into the Boston College Varsity Club Hall of Fame.
- On May 8, 2007, Flutie was elected to Canada's Sports Hall of Fame, becoming the first non-Canadian inductee.
- On May 9, 2007, Flutie was elected to the College Football Hall of Fame in his first year of eligibility.
- On April 2, 2008, Flutie was elected to the Canadian Football Hall of Fame in his first year of eligibility.
- In 2009, Flutie was elected to the Ontario Sports Hall of Fame.
- In 2014, Flutie was inducted into the Space Coast Sports Hall of Fame.
- In 2015, Flutie was inducted into the Eastern College Athletic Conference Hall of Fame.
- In 2025, Flutie was inducted into the Hula Bowl Hall of Fame.

== Broadcasting career ==
After retirement from the NFL, Flutie took a commentating job calling college football for ESPN and ABC from 2006 until 2008.

Drawing on his USFL experience, Flutie served as an analyst for United Football League games for Versus in 2010.

Flutie served as a studio and pre-game analyst for Notre Dame Football on NBC from 2011 through 2013, then served as the lead analyst from 2014 through 2019.

== Other post-career endeavors ==
In 2011, Flutie signed a deal to endorse joint support supplement Instaflex.

On March 8, 2016, Flutie was announced as one of the celebrities who would compete on season 22 of Dancing with the Stars. He was partnered with professional dancer Karina Smirnoff. On April 25, 2016, Flutie and Smirnoff were eliminated, finishing in ninth place.

On November 20, 2018, a partnership deal was announced between Flutie and the Maximum Football video game (Canuck Play/Spear Interactive). Future iterations of the game will be rebranded as Doug Flutie's Maximum Football and feature Flutie's likeness. The game released on the PS4 and Xbox One in the Fall of 2019. On February 4, 2020, the game was available to purchase as a physical copy.

Since 2021, he has endorsed testosterone supplement Nugenix. He and fellow pitchman Frank Thomas were spoofed in a Saturday Night Live skit, with Kyle Mooney's Flutie and Kenan Thompson's Thomas extolling the virtues of the product to an unsuspecting man.

=== Baseball career ===
On July 6, 2025, Flutie played a game for the Savannah Bananas at Fenway Park. Flutie opened the game as the starting pitcher throwing 8 pitches and recording 1 out. The Bananas' third baseman, Kyle Jackson, enthusiastically ran across the infield after making the out with holding his glove in the air so that everybody in the stands could see. Flutie then ran off the mound giving high fives to all the Bananas' infield players as Fenway cheered on.

On August 12, 2025, Flutie signed with the Brockton Rox baseball team. The team held Doug Flutie night, a charity event on August 21, during the game Flutie came out of the bullpen in the first inning against the Québec Capitales. Throwing seven pitches five of them being strikes. After getting two strikes on the leadoff hitter, Flutie allowed an infield single before retiring his final batter on a grounder to third base.

=== Film and television ===
Flutie made his acting debut in 2002, on the television show Arliss, where he plays himself in the episode "When Opportunity Knocks". In 2005, he appeared as himself in an episode of the sitcom Listen Up.

In 2002, he appeared in the direct-to-TV film Second String, which is about the Buffalo Bills who find their first-string quarterback Flutie, out for a month after a food poisoning incident, leading the team's head coach, "Chuck Dichter", to hire an insurance salesman and former college quarterback named Dan Heller as the team's backup quarterback.

Flutie has since made numerous guest appearances on shows such as The Tonight Show with Jay Leno, Late Show with David Letterman, Wicked Bites and Good Morning America.

In 2017, Flutie appeared in a series of Dr Pepper television commercials alongside the fictional character Larry Culpepper. The campaign was released in conjunction with the college football season.

In 2019, he and his family appeared on Celebrity Family Feud, winning 25 thousand dollars for his charity.

In February 2021, Flutie won the WWE 24/7 Championship from R-Truth during a celebrity flag football tournament, though he would then immediately drop the title back to Truth.

== Personal life ==
Flutie is the older brother of the CFL's fourth all-time receptions leader, Darren Flutie. Flutie also has an older brother, Bill, and an older sister, Denise. His nephew Billy Flutie (son of Bill) was a wide receiver/punter at Boston College from 2007 to 2010. Another one of Flutie's nephews, Troy (son of Darren), played quarterback and wide receiver at Boston College from 2015 to 2017. Flutie is the second son of Richard and Joan Flutie.

Flutie is married to his high school sweetheart, Laurie (née Fortier). They have a daughter, Alexa, formerly a New England Patriots Cheerleader and San Diego Chargers Cheerleader, and a son, Doug Jr., who has childhood disintegrative disorder, a very rare severe late onset form of autism. The Fluties established The Doug Flutie Jr. Foundation for Autism, Inc. in honor of him. Flutie also created a cereal, Flutie Flakes, with the benefits going toward this organization. He also holds a yearly 5k race in Natick with the proceeds benefiting over 30+ New England based autism serving organizations.

In 2006, Flutie was honored by the city of Boston, being given the Red, White & Blue Award for his unyielding support of the Boston community. In 2010, he was named the Central Florida Humanitarian of the year for his philanthropic efforts.

In his free time, he attends college football and basketball games at his alma mater Boston College and was a season ticket-holder. He has spent his summers in Bethany Beach, Delaware, frequenting basketball courts. He also has worked with the local Massachusetts Eastern Bank and is a spokesman for Natick/Framingham's Metrowest Medical Center. He is a member of the Longfellow Sports Clubs at their Wayland and Natick locations. Flutie relocated from Natick to Florida, but was honored by Natick in November 2007 by being inducted into the Natick High School Wall of Achievement. A short stretch of road connecting the Natick Mall and the Shoppers World in Natick/Framingham, Massachusetts is named "Flutie Pass" in honor of his historic 1984 play against Miami. Flutie frequents Melbourne Beach, Florida in winter, and a sports field complex there is named after him. For a time, he was part-owner of a restaurant in New York City's South Street Seaport named "Flutie's".

Flutie has a large collection of Batman memorabilia from the Batman TV series. Most famously he owns the iconic 1960s Batmobile that he rebuilt. In 2022, he added to his collection when he purchased a replica of the Batmobile that was featured in Batman. Flutie drives them both frequently and puts them to good use by bringing them to charity events.

In 2024, the Athletes For A Better World organization announced Flutie was the winner of their Pro Wooden Citizenship Cup, the award is given out to athletes that epitomize high standards of character, leadership, and community service.

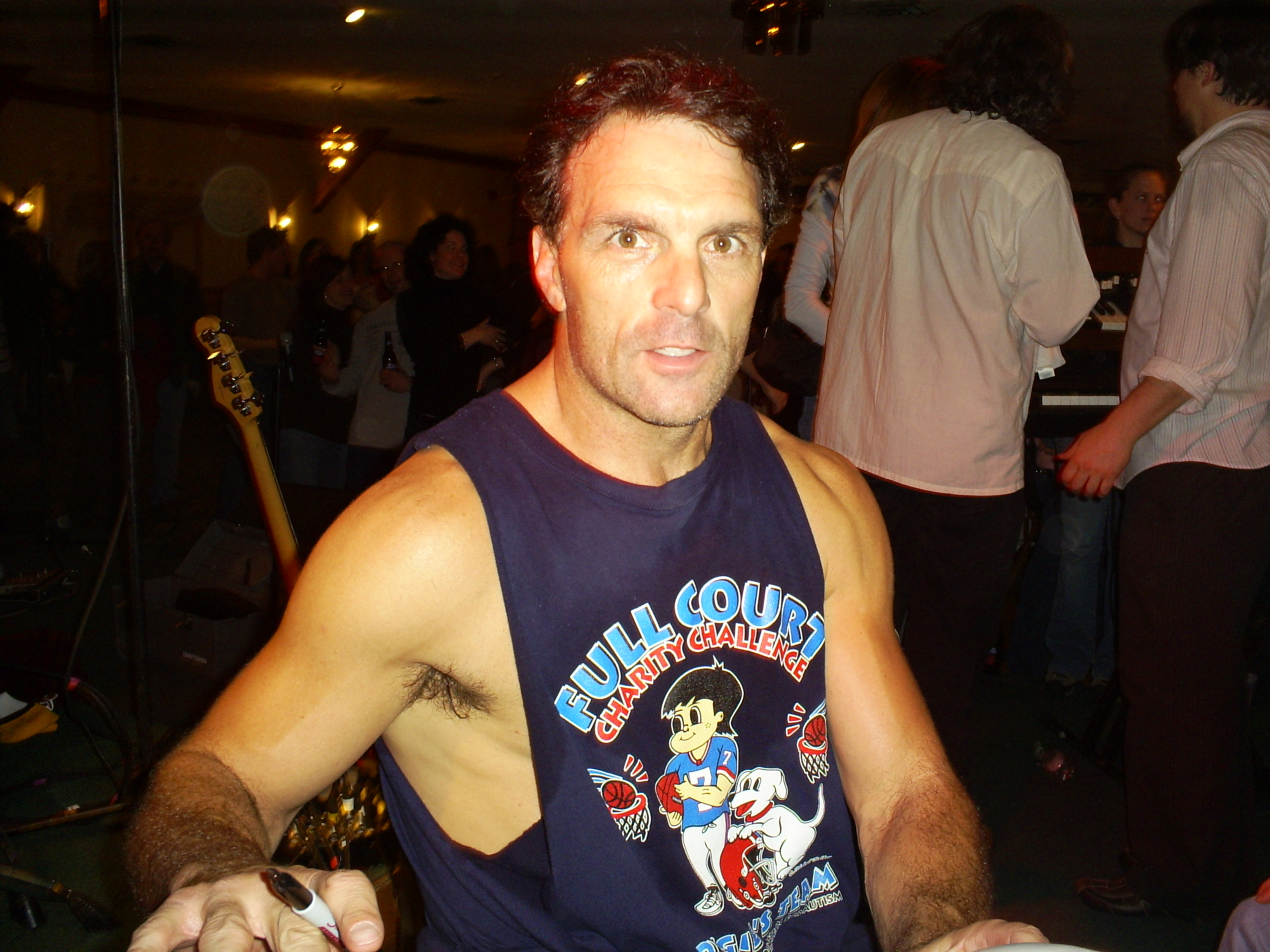
Flutie during a Flutie Brothers Band concert in 2009.

With his brother Darren on guitar, Doug plays drums in the Flutie Brothers Band, and once played for Boston at a tribute honoring Doug. November 13, 2006, was Doug Flutie Day in Boston. Flutie endorsed Scott Brown for the U.S. Senate in Massachusetts for 2010, and the Flutie Brothers Band played at Brown's victory celebration. The Flutie Brothers released a 9-song album in 1996 titled Catch This, which was followed by Ramblin' Scramblin Man that was released in 1999; they still occasionally play shows to this day.

In 2014, Flutie, who has a charity team that was running the Boston Marathon, decided to run it himself two days before the race, and finished in 5:23:54. Since then, Flutie has run the marathon four more times, with his most recent run coming in 2023.

On November 18, 2015, Flutie's parents Dick and Joan Flutie died of heart attacks one hour apart. Dick Flutie had been ill and hospitalized.

== See also ==
- List of NFL quarterbacks who have posted a perfect passer rating
- List of gridiron football quarterbacks passing statistics
- List of NCAA Division I FBS quarterbacks with at least 10,000 career passing yards
- List of NCAA major college football yearly passing leaders
- List of NCAA major college football yearly total offense leaders
