= Jackie Bradley Jr. =

American baseball player (born 1990)

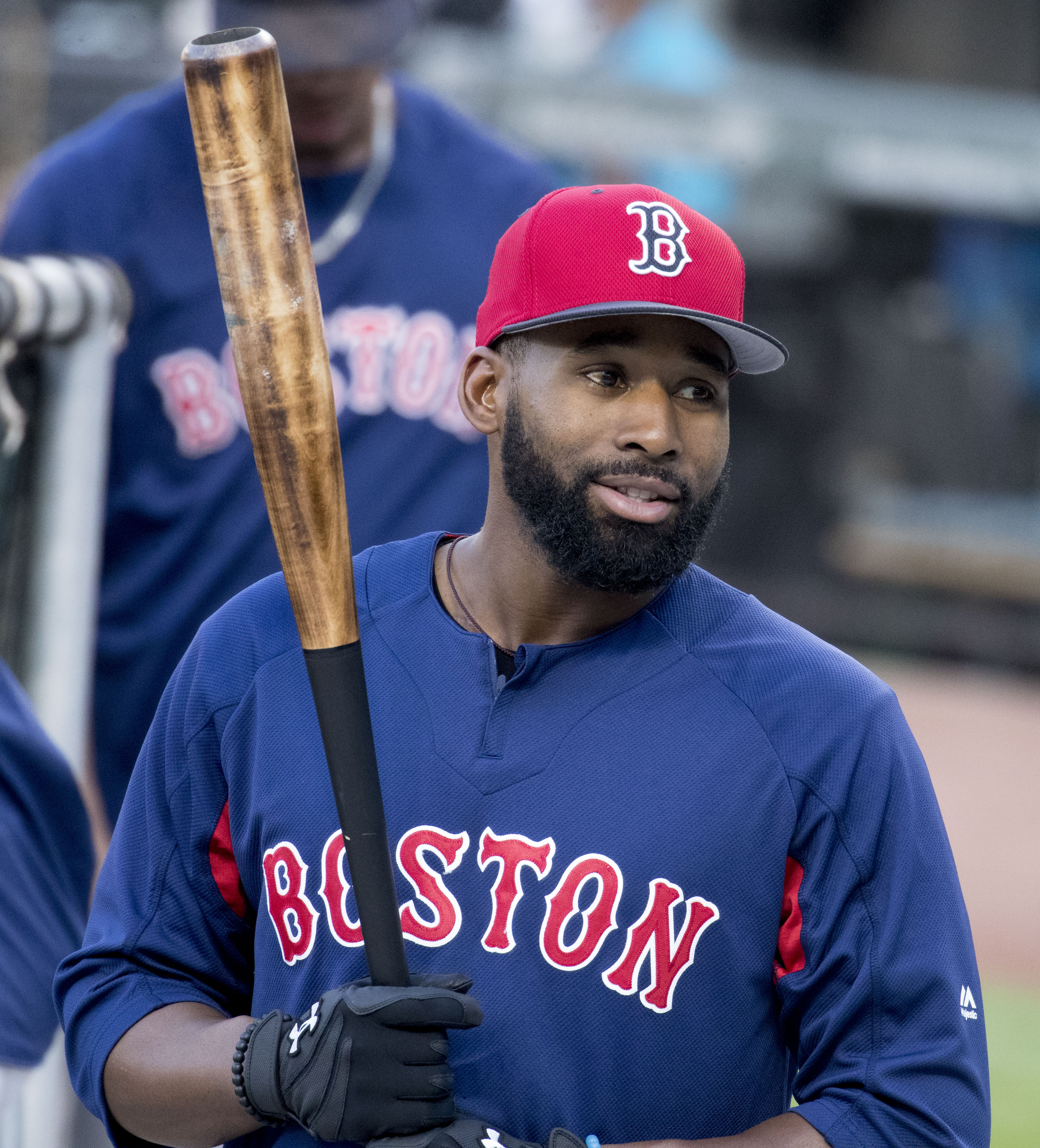
- Bradley with the Boston Red Sox in 2017

Indianapolis Clowns – No. 19
- Center fielder
- Born: April 19, 1990 (age 36); Richmond, Virginia, U.S.
- Batted: Left Threw: Right

MLB debut
- April 1, 2013, for the Boston Red Sox

Last MLB appearance
- June 7, 2023, for the Kansas City Royals

MLB statistics
- Batting average: .225
- Home runs: 109
- Runs batted in: 449
- Stats at Baseball Reference

Teams
- Boston Red Sox (2013–2020); Milwaukee Brewers (2021); Boston Red Sox (2022); Toronto Blue Jays (2022); Kansas City Royals (2023)

Career highlights and awards
- All Star (2016); World Series champion (2018); ALCS MVP (2018); Gold Glove Award (2018)

Jackie Bradley Jr. (born April 19, 1990), nicknamed "JBJ", is an American professional baseball outfielder for the Indianapolis Clowns of the Banana Ball Championship League and sports broadcaster. He played in Major League Baseball (MLB) for the Boston Red Sox, Milwaukee Brewers, Toronto Blue Jays, and Kansas City Royals. Listed at 5 feet 10 inches (1.78 m) and 200 pounds (91 kg), he bats left and throws right-handed.

Bradley played college baseball for the University of South Carolina, and was named the 2010 College World Series Most Outstanding Player. The Red Sox chose Bradley with the 40th overall pick in the 2011 MLB draft and he made his MLB debut in 2013. Bradley was an All Star in 2016 and named the most valuable player of the 2018 American League Championship Series. Known especially for fielding ability, he won a Gold Glove Award in 2018. Bradley left the Red Sox in free agency for the Brewers after the 2020 season, but the Brewers traded him back to the Red Sox one year later in exchange for Hunter Renfroe.

== Amateur career ==
Bradley attended Prince George High School in Prince George, Virginia. He was named to the 2008 Virginia AAA All-State team and was listed as the 40th-best Virginia-based baseball prospect for the 2008 Major League Baseball draft by Baseball America.

With the University of South Carolina, Bradley began his college baseball career with the South Carolina Gamecocks baseball team in 2009. As a freshman, Bradley hit .349 and scored 69 runs in 63 games played. Posting a slugging percentage of .537, he hit 11 home runs while walking 34 times and striking out 31 times. After the 2009 season, he played collegiate summer baseball with the Hyannis Mets of the Cape Cod Baseball League.

In 2010, Bradley batted .368 and 13 home runs, driving in 60 runs while scoring 56 times in 67 games. Then, he went 10-for-29 (.345) at the plate in the 2010 College World Series (CWS), earning CWS Most Outstanding Player honors.

== Professional career ==
=== Boston Red Sox ===
==== Minor leagues ====
The Boston Red Sox selected Bradley in the supplemental first round, with the 40th overall selection, of the 2011 Major League Baseball draft. Bradley made his professional debut on August 23, 2011, with the short-season A Lowell Spinners, hitting .250 in 10 games split between Lowell and the single-A Greenville Drive. Bradley was named Minor League Defensive Player of the Year by the Red Sox organization for the 2012 season, which he split between the high-A Salem Red Sox and double-A Portland Sea Dogs. He hit .315 with 55 extra-base hits, 87 walks, and 63 RBI in 128 games.

==== 2013 ====
Entering 2013, Bradley ranked 32nd overall on the MLB.com Top 100 Prospects list. After an outstanding spring training, on March 31, manager John Farrell announced that Bradley would be the Opening Day left fielder on April 1 at Yankee Stadium. Although he went hitless in two at-bats, Bradley had three walks, scored two runs, drove in one run, and made a couple of hustle plays on the basepath and in the field in the Red Sox' 8–2 win over the New York Yankees.

Bradley went 3-for-31 with three RBIs in Boston before being optioned to the Triple-A Pawtucket Red Sox on April 19; Bradley was demoted to accommodate David Ortiz, who started the 2013 season on a rehab assignment, recovering from a right Achilles injury. Bradley was recalled on May 29. He hit his first career home run on June 4 against the Texas Rangers. Bradley was optioned back to Pawtucket on June 8 when Shane Victorino was activated from the disabled list. He was recalled again on July 9, and optioned back to Pawtucket on July 14. He was recalled on September 7. In 37 Major League games of 2013, Bradley batted .189 with three home runs, 10 RBI, and two stolen bases. The Red Sox finished the year with a 97–65 record and clinched the AL East division. Bradley was not on Boston's postseason roster as the team went on to win the 2013 World Series.

==== 2014 ====
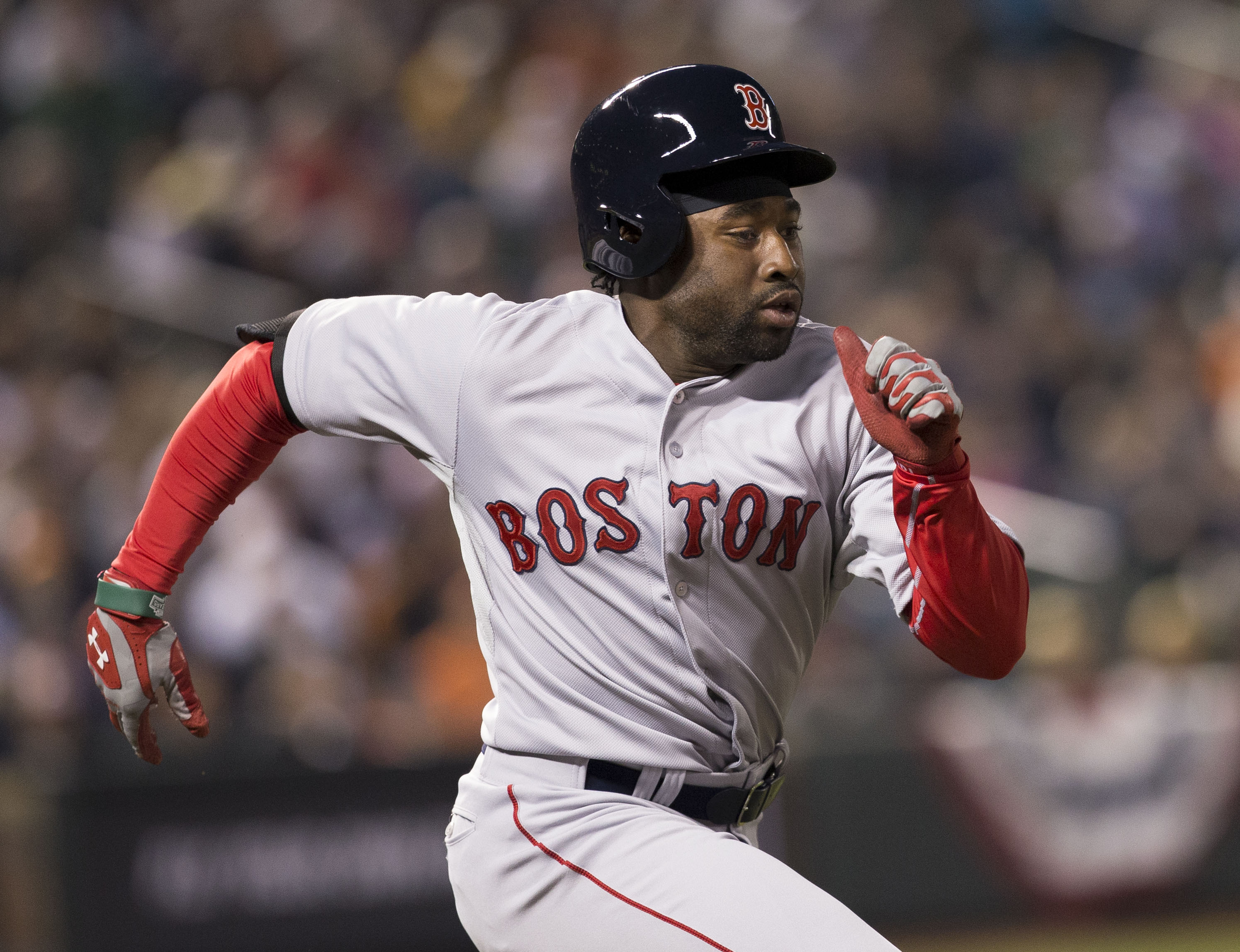
Bradley with the 2014 Red Sox

On March 28, 2014, Bradley was optioned to Triple-A Pawtucket after he was unable to beat Grady Sizemore for the starting center field position, but was recalled three days later after the team placed Shane Victorino on the 15-day disabled list. Bradley saw regular time as the team's center fielder throughout the 2014 season, appearing in 127 games, but was optioned back to Triple-A Pawtucket on August 18 after hitting just .216, despite playing exceptional defense. He finished the MLB season with a .198 batting average with one home run and 30 RBIs.

==== 2015 ====
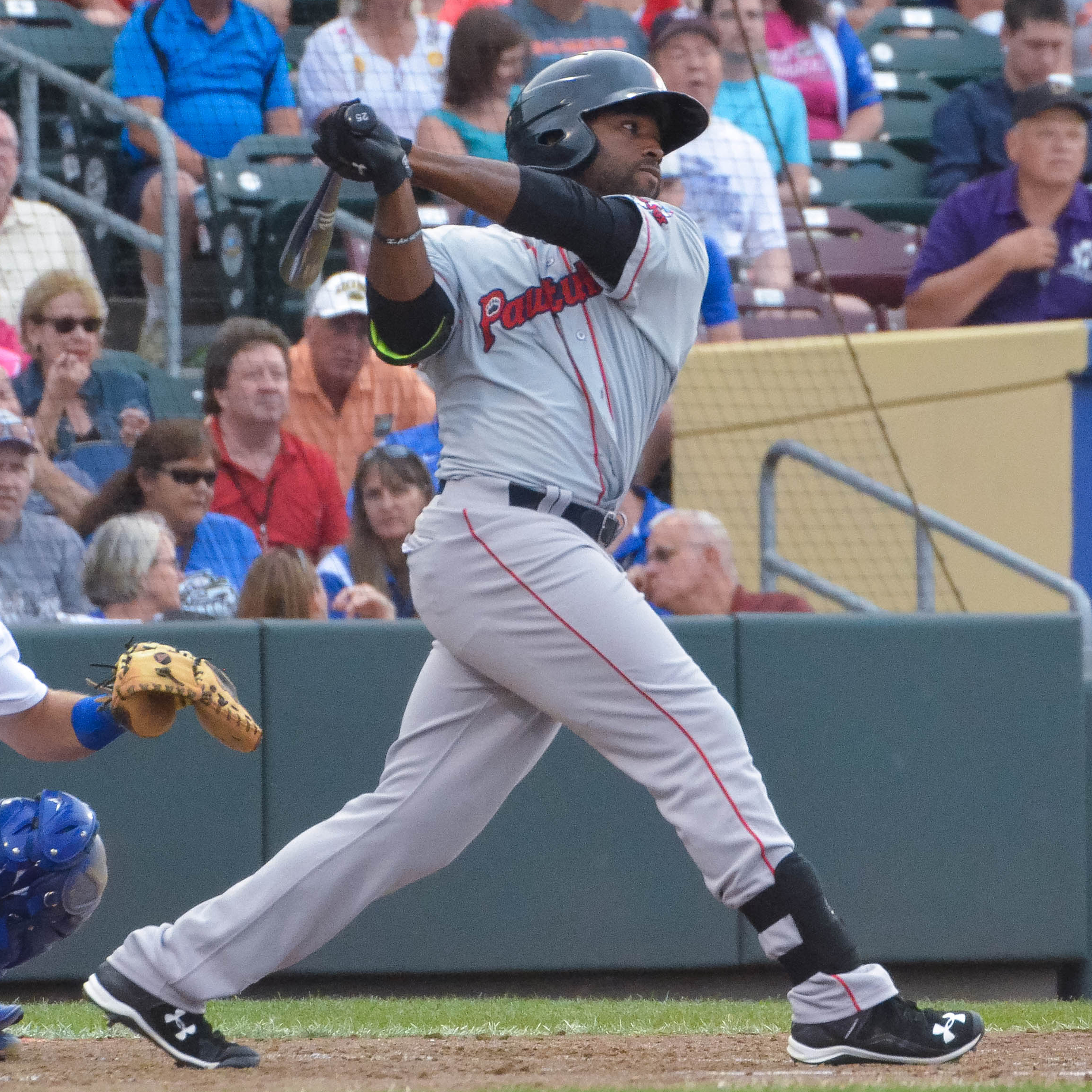
Bradley with the Pawtucket Red Sox at the 2015 Triple-A All-Star Game

During the 2015 season, Bradley split time between Boston and Pawtucket. On June 25, he was called up to play right field for the Red Sox while Hanley Ramírez recuperated with a sore wrist. In a June 30 game against the Toronto Blue Jays pitcher Marco Estrada, Bradley hit his first home run since May 31, 2014. On August 15, 2015, Bradley became only the eighth player in the modern era with five extra-base hits in one game, recording two home runs and three doubles in six at-bats, in the Red Sox' 22–10 defeat of the Seattle Mariners. He became a regular starter for Boston from late July through the end of the season. Overall for the 2015 season, Bradley appeared in 74 MLB games, batting .249 with 10 home runs and 43 RBIs.

==== 2016 ====
Between April 24 and May 25, Bradley hit safely in 29 straight games, tying Johnny Damon for the fourth longest hitting streak in Red Sox history. Bradley's streak came to an end in a loss to the Colorado Rockies on May 26. At the time he started his hitting streak, he was batting .222, and when it ended, he had raised his average up to .350. This streak, along with excellent defense, earned him AL Player of the Month recognition for May. Bradley was selected to the All-Star Game, the first of his career. He started in left field, and was 2-for-2 at the plate. He ended the 2016 season with a .267 batting average, 26 home runs, and 87 RBIs, having appeared in 156 games. In the 2016 postseason, he batted 1-for-10 (.100) as Boston lost to the Cleveland Indians in the Division Series.

==== 2017 ====
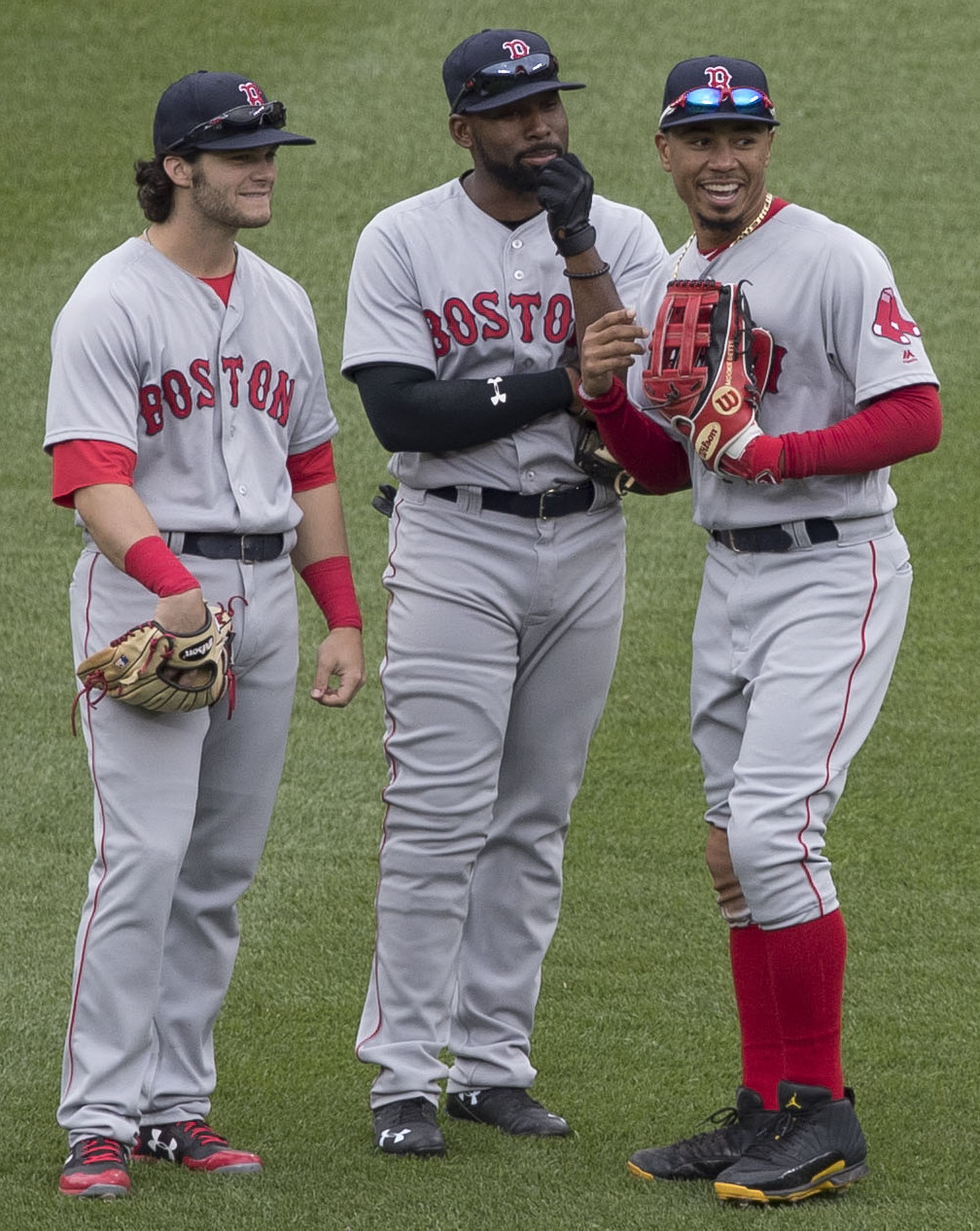
Andrew Benintendi, Bradley, and Mookie Betts (from left) in 2017

In the 2016 offseason, Bradley switched his uniform number from 25 to 19, which had been worn by Koji Uehara since 2013. Bradley reportedly made the switch for several reasons, including that his birthday is April 19 and that he wore 19 in college.

On April 8, 2017, Bradley fell to the ground after flying out and left the game. It was reported that Bradley suffered a sprain to his right knee. Two days later, on April 10, Bradley was placed on the 10-day disabled list. On August 22, Bradley injured his left thumb while sliding towards home plate and left the game. The next day, on August 23, Bradley was again placed on the 10-day disabled list due to spraining his left thumb. For the 2017 regular season, Bradley appeared in 133 games, batting .245 with 17 home runs and 63 RBIs. In the postseason, he was 3-for-15 (.200) with a home run and five RBIs, as the Red Sox lost to the Houston Astros in the Division Series.

==== 2018 ====
Bradley was again the everyday center fielder for the Red Sox, and drew national attention for his stellar defense, but struggled at the plate until mid-August. On August 11, in the first game of a day-night doubleheader against the Baltimore Orioles, Bradley homered twice to lift the Red Sox to a 5–0 victory. For the season, Bradley struggled offensively, hitting .234 with 13 home runs 59 RBIs and 17 stolen bases in 144 games.

On October 14, in Game 2 of the American League Championship Series against the Houston Astros, Bradley drove in three runs with a double in the third inning, giving Boston a 5–4 lead in a game they would go on to win, 7–5. In Game 3, he hit a grand slam off of Roberto Osuna in the top of the eighth inning, extending Boston's lead from 4–2 to 8–2, which would prove to be the final score. In Game 4, he hit a two-run go-ahead home run off of Josh James in the top of the sixth inning, putting the Red Sox up 6–5 en route to an 8–6 final. Bradley finished the series with nine RBIs, all from those three hits, and was named the American League Championship Series Most Valuable Player. The Red Sox went on to win the World Series over the Los Angeles Dodgers; he batted 3-for-13 in the World Series. Bradley later received his first Rawlings Gold Glove Award.

==== 2019 ====
Bradley returned to his center field role with Boston in 2019, appearing in 147 games while batting .225 with 21 home runs and 62 RBIs. He made contact with the lowest percentage of pitches he swung at in the strike zone (76.4%) of all major league batters. On defense he led all American League center fielders in assists, with 10, and had the fastest reaction but took the worst route of all major league outfielders (-2.0 vs. average). Bradley's over-the-wall catch of a Trey Mancini drive on May 8 was selected as number one on the list of MLB Network's Top 100 Plays of 2019, while number two on the list was an over-the-wall catch by Stevie Wilkerson on a drive that Bradley hit on September 29.

==== 2020 ====
During the start-delayed 2020 season, Bradley was again Boston's primary center fielder. Overall with the 2020 Red Sox, he batted .283 with seven home runs and 22 RBIs in 55 games. On October 28, Bradley elected free agency.

=== Milwaukee Brewers ===
On March 8, 2021, Bradley officially signed a two-year, $24 million contract with the Milwaukee Brewers. He appeared in 134 games with the 2021 Brewers, batting .163 with 6 home runs and 29 RBIs. His batting average was the lowest among MLB players with at least 324 plate appearances. He played 117 games in the outfield, 89 as center fielder.

=== Boston Red Sox (second stint) ===
On December 1, 2021, the Brewers traded Bradley, David Hamilton, and Alex Binelas to the Red Sox in exchange for Hunter Renfroe. Bradley began the 2022 season mainly appearing as a right fielder for Boston, with occasional games in center field. He was briefly on the paternity list in early June, as his wife gave birth to their third child. On July 8, Bradley made his major-league pitching debut during a 12–5 loss to the Yankees at Fenway and struck out two-time batting champion DJ LeMahieu with a 67-mile-per-hour (108 km/h) pitch. Bradley was released by the Red Sox on August 4, becoming a free agent, shortly after the team acquired Tommy Pham and Eric Hosmer. In 91 games with Boston, Bradley batted .210 with three home runs and 29 RBIs.

=== Toronto Blue Jays ===
On August 9, 2022, Bradley signed a one-year contract with the Toronto Blue Jays. In 40 games with the Blue Jays through the end of the season, he batted .178 with one home run and nine RBIs, giving him a overall .203 average for the 2022 season. For the year, Bradley was again nominated for a Gold Glove Award.

=== Kansas City Royals ===
On March 1, 2023, the Kansas City Royals announced that they had signed Bradley to a minor league contract. The agreement came with an invitation to the major league team's spring training, with the expectation that Bradley could provide depth in the outfield following injuries to Drew Waters and Diego Hernández. At the end of spring training, the Royals announced that Bradley had made the team and would be added to its 40-man roster. He played in 43 total games for Kansas City, but limped to a .133/.188/.210 slash line with one home run and six RBIs. On June 12, Bradley was designated for assignment by the Royals following the promotion of Dairon Blanco. On June 16, the Royals waived Bradley, making him a free agent.

=== Long Island Ducks ===
On April 4, 2024, Bradley signed with the Long Island Ducks of the Atlantic League of Professional Baseball. In 40 games for the Ducks, Bradley batted .400/.476/.727 with 12 home runs, 35 RBI, and six stolen bases.

=== New York Mets ===
On July 23, 2024, Bradley signed a minor league contract with the New York Mets. In 25 games for the Triple–A Syracuse Mets, he slashed .209/.266/.361 with two home runs, nine RBI, and five stolen bases. Bradley was released by the Mets organization on September 23.

== Post-playing career ==
On April 24, 2025, Bradley was hired by ESPN to serve as a college baseball analyst for the SEC Network.

=== Return to baseball ===
On November 13, 2025, Bradley was the first pick in the inaugural Banana Ball draft, joining the upstart Indianapolis Clowns. He said in an interview that the decision came together over a matter of days, influenced by his July guest appearance at a Savannah Bananas game in Boston. He is the first former MLB player to join a Banana Ball team full-time.

== Personal life ==
Bradley is naturally right-handed, but learned to hit left-handed when he was eight years old.

He is the son of Jackie Bradley Sr., a bus driver in Richmond, Virginia. Singer Jackie Wilson is his namesake.

Bradley is married to Erin Heiring. A daughter was born in June 2016, a son in December 2020, and another daughter in June 2022.

Before each at bat, Bradley writes "M.S." in the dirt in honor of his friend William Matthew "Matt" Saye, a high school classmate who died in a 2011 car accident. Bradley, who was close with Saye, said, "You never know what the next day will bring, if there is a next day. This really all came to me after my best friend died in August. He was like a brother to me. In his obituary, I was mentioned as his only surviving brother. And he was a different race (white). That's how close we were. I know he has my back and he's there supporting me."
