= Kyle Jackson (baseball) =

American baseball player and social media personality (born 2002)

Kyle "KJ" Jackson

Savannah Bananas – No. 4
- Utility player
- Born: April 19, 2002 (age 24); Bowling Green, Ohio, U.S.

Banana Ball (BBCL) debut
- 2022, for the Visitors

Kyle David "KJ" Jackson (born 2002) is an American baseball player and social media personality, He is best known for his role as a member of the Savannah Bananas, where he has been described as one of the top stars of Banana Ball. He is also known for his social media presence. He previously was a member of the baseball team at Kent State University.

== Biography ==
Jackson was born on April 19, 2002 in Bowling Green, Ohio, and attended Bowling Green High School, where he played baseball and was named the 2019 Mirror Player of the Year.

He attended Kent State University, where he played for the Kent State Golden Flashes baseball team. He majored in sports psychology and minored in theater performance. He also spent some of the 2023 season with the summer baseball team the St. Cloud Rox. He was named to the 2023 Mid-American Conference All Tournament Team.

When he was 20, he suffered from ruptured L4 and L5 discs and had to undergo spinal surgery.

During his senior year, his coach Jeff Duncan recommended him to the coach of the Savannah Bananas, and immediately after interviewing he was selected to join the Banana Visitors. He has stated that on Thursday he finished his season, Saturday he went to tryouts, and by Tuesday he was in Savannah. He played six games with the Visitors. Under a year later, he joined the Bananas team. He has discussed how he believes this was the "best of both worlds" for him, combining his passions for entertainment and sports, due to the unique style of Banana Ball. He became known in 2025 for his triple play.

He draws a cross and a heart under his eyes before every game, something he has attributed to the importance he places on his faith, especially after his spinal surgery.

He was ranked by Ranker as the hottest member of the Savannah Bananas. He was described by Savannah Now as one of the top stars of the Bananas. As of July 2025, he had 783,000 followers: by April 2026, he had 1.4 million followers.

He has held a fundraiser in Thomasville for the American Cancer Society. In 2025, he was one of three Bananas players to be voted by the fans to be kept on the team, alongside Jackson Olson.

He was appointed by gym franchise Workout Anytime as the "chief aura officer", a paid position where his role involves driving brand awareness, making in-person appearances at gyms, and utilizing his social media, with an emphasis on the positive aftereffects of working out. He is also an Under Armour brand ambassador.
