= Banana Ball =

American baseball league

Banana Ball Championship League
- Classification: Independent
- Sport: Banana Ball
- Founded: 2026
- Commissioner: Jesse Cole
- Motto: Fans First. Entertain Always.
- No. of teams: 6
- Most recent champion: Texas Tailgaters
- Broadcasters: United States: ESPN ESPN2 ABC truTV CW Sports
- Streaming partners: United States: ESPN+ YouTube
- Website: bananaball.com

The Banana Ball Championship League (BBCL or Banana League) is a barnstorming professional baseball league based in Savannah, Georgia. The league, which held its debut season in 2026, plays a version of baseball called Banana Ball developed by the Savannah Bananas, which emphasizes showmanship, fan participation, and quick-paced games.

The league has six teams: the Bananas, the Party Animals, the Firefighters, the Texas Tailgaters, the Loco Beach Coconuts and the Indianapolis Clowns, the latter a revival of the Negro league baseball team. BBCL games are played primarily at baseball and football stadiums around the United States.

Banana Ball has been compared to the exhibition basketball games played by the Harlem Globetrotters; league owner Jesse Cole has said its games are neither exhibitions nor scripted sports entertainment with predetermined outcomes.

== History ==
=== Origins and early exhibition seasons (2018–2025) ===
The Banana Ball format began in 2018 when the Savannah Bananas, originally a collegiate summer baseball team, played an alternate-rules exhibition game with Lander University. The first official Banana Ball game was played in June 2020 at Grayson Stadium in Savannah, Georgia, with the Bananas splitting into two for the game. The following month, the Party Animals team was created to give the Bananas an opponent for Banana Ball games. From 2020 to 2022, the Savannah team played Banana Ball at home games and regular Coastal Plain League (CPL) rules on the road.

In 2023, the Savannah Bananas left the CPL and were playing Banana Ball fulltime, including exhibition "challenger games" on the road against regular baseball teams (namely the Kansas City Monarchs, Charleston Dirty Birds, Trenton Thunder, and Milwaukee Milkmen). In 2024, the Bananas hosted a "World Tour" consisting of games featuring games with a third dedicated Banana Ball team (the Firefighters), a developmental team (the Visitors), and a team of touring colliegate baseball players from Australia (the Aussie Dropbears). In 2025, the teams mounted a second Banana Ball World Tour, with an expanded four team lineup (following the addition of the Texas Tailgaters) and the implementation of a championship series. The 2025 championship was won by the Party Animals.

=== Banana Ball Championship League (2026–present) ===
In 2026, the Banana Ball Championship League began its first season, following the league's expansion to six teams. The first Banana Ball Open, an early in-season tournament, took place April 16–19, 2026 at Grayson Stadium; it was won by the Texas Tailgaters. The inaugural Banana Bowl was won by the Texas Tailgaters in October 10, 2026 at Nationals Park in Washington, D.C. An inaugural all-star game of Banana Ball veterans and new draftees joining the league in 2027 was held at Grayson Stadium to conclude the 2026 season.

The second BBCL season in 2027 will see Banana Ball played outside the United States for the first time (with games to be played in Mexico and Canada), the Banana Ball Open relocated to Walt Disney World's The Stadium at the ESPN Wide World of Sports, and Banana Bowl II will be played at the yet-to-be-completed New Nissan Stadium in Nashville.

== Teams ==
=== Savannah Bananas ===
The Bananas were part of the Coastal Plain League (CPL) West division, where they won three Petitt Cup championships (2016, 2021, and 2022). However, after the growth of Banana Ball, the team moved entirely to Banana Ball games in 2023 against their partner touring teams. Wearing yellow jerseys, they are the league's most well-known team. Notable current and former players include Kelsie Whitmore, Jocelyn Alo, and Dakota “Stilts” Albritton.

=== Party Animals ===
During the 2020 shortened Bananas CPL season, the organization debuted a second squad for Banana Ball games at home: the Party Animals, wearing black or pink uniforms. Previously, the Banana Ball games were played as intrasquad scrimmage games of the CPL Bananas pre-season. In 2024, the Party Animals were fleshed out as a more permanent team with its own slate of games outside of the Bananas tour. Some fans have begun to question whether Banana Ball is still "family-friendly" given the antics of this team which includes things like players dancing shirtless in-between innings, players climbing on top of dugouts and then ditching their shirts, and a "cougar race," for which moms are summoned from the crowd and ordered to give piggyback rides to shirtless players around the diamond. The team has been called the "gayest team in baseball" thanks to their theatrical, swagger-heavy routines that heavily borrow from queer and drag culture.

=== Firefighters ===
Debuting on October 5, 2023, as part of the 2024 season launch night, the Firefighters wear firefighter-themed uniforms, including firefighter helmets instead of the usual batting helmets used by the rest of the league. Starting in 2025, they have their own slate of games separate from the Bananas tour.

=== Texas Tailgaters ===
The Texas Tailgaters were announced on October 3, 2024, during the 2025 season launch night, as the fourth team in the league and fifth overall. Despite the name, the team is also currently based in Savannah, Georgia, but it hosted home games in Texas and Oklahoma since their inaugural season. The Tailgaters are the first semi-regional team to launch since the original Bananas. In addition to their Texas headlining tour, the Tailgaters' first season was also successfully held with games across the country against the other three league teams. They wear elements of the Texas state flag colors in their uniform jerseys. The Tailgaters would again be given their own slate of home games as part of the BBCL beginning in 2026. In October of the same year, the Tailgaters won Banana Bowl I.

=== Loco Beach Coconuts ===
On October 9, 2025, as part of the 2026 season launch night, the BBCL announced the creation of the Loco Beach Coconuts, which made their league debut in 2026 with their tropical and beach-themed uniforms. The team has a beach and oceanic theme with their two mascots, Coco the Coconut and Peter Colada, whom the team debuted during the 2026 Bananaland at Sea cruise. Former MLB outfielder Shane Victorino was announced as the first "primetime coach and manager" for the team.

=== Indianapolis Clowns ===
On October 9, 2025, the league debuted the Indianapolis Clowns, a nod to the club of the same name from the Negro leagues; they wear a modernized form of the uniform jerseys of the old club. The revival of the Clowns name was done in partnership with the Negro Leagues Baseball Museum. Notable Clowns include former MLB first baseman Ryan Howard, the team's "primetime coach and manager"; outfielder and World Series champion Jackie Bradley Jr., the first former major-leaguer to play in Banana Ball full-time; and Philadelphia-born Mo'ne Davis, who also plays for the Women's Professional Baseball League and who was the first girl at thirteen years old to earn a win and to throw a shutout in Little League World Series history.

=== Defunct teams ===
==== Visitors ====
Introduced in June 2024, the Visitors served as opponents for the Party Animals or Bananas in certain games when the other team faced the Firefighters or the Texas Tailgaters. The Visitors wore generic gray uniforms with blue numbering (with no names on the back of jerseys) and constituted the developmental or tryout wing of the Bananas organization, but that phased out as of 2026, and the franchise was split into two Banana Ball teams: the Loco Beach Coconuts and the Indianapolis Clowns.

== Banana Ball rules ==
The rules of Banana Ball have developed over time. As of February 2026, the Banana Ball rules are as amended:

1. Games are won by points, instead of runs: the team that scores the most runs in an inning gets one point, except in the final inning when every run counts as one point. The final inning may be earlier than the ninth inning, due to the time limit noted below. When the home team has scored enough runs to "win" any inning other than the final inning, the inning immediately ends.
2. There is a two-hour time limit; no new inning may start after 120 minutes have elapsed. Once an inning starts, it is played to completion.
3. Batters cannot step out of the batter's box. Doing so results in an automatic strike.
4. Batters cannot bunt. Doing so results in an automatic ejection.
5. Batters can attempt to steal first base at any point during their at bat, including on passed balls or wild pitches.
6. Walks are replaced by "ball-four sprints". After ball four, the batter and all baserunners are allowed to advance as far around the bases as they can while the ball is sequentially thrown to all of the fielders other than the pitcher, starting with the catcher. The ball remains dead, with runners not able to be gotten out as they run, until the four infielders and three outfielders have each touched the ball. This often results in the batter advancing to second base on the sprint, and baserunners advancing multiple bases, often scoring.
7. No mound visits are allowed.
8. Foul balls caught by fans on the fly are counted as outs.
9. Ties are broken by a "showdown tiebreaker", an abbreviated extra innings format. Each team's half-inning during the showdown ends with any out, or run scored by the batter—if the batter puts the ball in play, he must attempt to score. A batter who draws a walk advances to second base, with the hitting team allowed to send a new batter to the plate. The same happens if the batter is hit by a pitch. At any point during the showdown, a home run hit over the outfield wall immediately ends the game in favor of the batting team. If the game is still tied after a showdown round, another showdown round is played, until there is a winner. Scenarios differ by showdown round: In showdown round 1, each team selects a pitcher and hitter to face off, with the defense fielding only their pitcher, catcher, and a single fielder. In showdown round 2, the fielder is eliminated. In showdown round 3 (and later), the fielder returns, but each half-inning starts with the bases loaded, and each run scored counts as a point. This also affects the ball-four sprints or walks given up: as walks or sprints are added during this time, runners are added in for either the home or away teams, with 3 consecutive walks/sprints determining the walk-off victory by the home or away team.
10. Each team is allowed to challenge certain calls by the umpires: whether a ball was fair or foul, whether or not a runner was tagged out (at home plate or on the basepaths), and whether a ball was caught or not. A team retains its right to challenge until they lose a challenge, after which they may not challenge any calls for the remainder of the game. The fans can also challenge one play per game, as determined by a fan who is chosen to initiate the challenge. Challenged plays are reviewed by the broadcast team, who relay their ruling to the umpire.
11. "The Golden Batter Rule" – One time in a game, a team may send any hitter in the lineup to bat in any spot. The goal of this rule is so a team can have their best hitter hit when the game is on the line.
12. "The Equalizer Point" – If the visiting team has more trick plays—defined as "routine plays made in a non-routine fashion"—than the home team after eight innings, they get an extra point before the ninth inning. Trick pitches—pitches delivered in a non-routine fashion, such as behind-the-back pitches—are permitted and can count as trick plays if an out is recorded.
13. "The Designated Fielder Rule" – Similar to the Golden Batter rule, but on the defensive side: any team can, once in a game, send one extra or bench player to field in replacement of an active player.
14. Ceremonial first pitches affect the first batter's count.

Other non-standard baseball activities are sometimes used for entertainment purposes, including specialty walk-ups starting from the stands, in-game dances, run celebrations, and guest hitters and pitchers, usually former major-leaguers (except Jackie Bradley Jr.).

== Media coverage ==
=== Broadcast ===
Banana Ball made its national television debut in 2022 through a six-game agreement with ESPN. One game aired on ESPN2 and the others on ESPN+. The agreement returned in 2023 with one game on ESPN2 and two others on ESPN+.

The Bananas expanded their TV coverage in the 2024 season. In April 2024, the Bananas announced that 19 games would air on Stadium and Bally Live. In July, they announced a five-game agreement with ESPN. For the first time, three games aired on ESPN with two others airing on ESPN2 as part of the annual ESPN8 The Ocho event. In August, the Bananas announced an agreement with TNT Sports to exclusively air five games on TruTV.

In 2025, the Bananas announced a 10-game agreement with ESPN. For the first time, all 10 will be simulcast on Disney+ and ESPN+ along with airing on ESPN or ESPN2. It was later announced that two additional games will air only on ESPN+ and Disney+. Other games will continue to stream on Stadium and Bally Sports Live. In July, the Bananas announced one-game agreements with The Roku Channel and The CW. The game on The CW was the first time a Bananas game has aired over-the-air. Later in July, the Bananas announced an agreement with TNT Sports to air 19 games on TruTV and HBO Max beginning August 16. For the first time, this agreement includes the Banana Ball Tour Championship.

The Savannah Bananas retained the same partners for the 2026 season, while expanding the number of televised Banana ball games not including the Savannah Bananas. 25 games will air on ESPN platforms, including the first ever game on ABC, with all games streaming on Disney+ and ESPN Unlimited. Additionally, TruTV and HBO Max will air 15 games, The CW will air six games, and the Roku Channel will air five games. On May 12, 2026, Disney+ announced it had acquired rights to that year's league championship, renamed the Banana Bowl.

Regardless of where a game is broadcast, all Banana Ball games are streamed for free on the home team's YouTube channel.
