= Gerard Phelan =

American football player (born 1963)

No. 20
- Position: Wide receiver

Personal information
- Born: January 20, 1963 (age 63)
- Listed height: 6 ft 1 in (1.85 m)
- Listed weight: 190 lb (86 kg)

Career information
- High school: Archbishop John Carroll
- College: Boston College (1981–1984)

Awards and highlights
- Second-team All-American (1984); First-team All-East (1984); Boston College Varsity Club Hall of Fame (2007); Game-winning "Hail Flutie" catch (1984)

Gerard P. Phelan (born January 20, 1963) is an American former college football player who was a wide receiver for the Boston College Eagles. He earned second-team All-American honors in 1984.

== Career ==
=== Early life ===
Phelan played high school football for Archbishop John Carroll High School in Radnor, Pennsylvania and graduated in 1981.

=== College football ===
Phelan continued his football career at Boston College, where he played from 1981 to 1984 as a wide receiver.

Phelan is remembered for his game-winning catch in the "Hail Flutie" game on November 23, 1984, which pitted the Boston College Eagles against the University of Miami Hurricanes in the Orange Bowl in Miami. The game is typically ranked among the greatest of all college football games, where Phelan caught eleven of quarterback Doug Flutie's forty-six pass attempts for a total of 226 receiving yards and two touchdowns.

Phelan caught the 48-yard game-winning Hail Mary touchdown that cemented a place for him in Boston College lore. With possession on Miami's 48-yard line, the Eagles trailed the Hurricanes 45–41 with just six seconds left. A desperation play known as "55 Flood Tip" was signaled, which called for the receivers to run toward the end zone and attempt to tip a jump ball to an open receiver. Miami's defensive backs stopped before the goal line, most likely because they did not believe Flutie could throw the ball farther than that, which allowed Phelan to get behind them. As the game clock expired, Flutie eluded a Miami pass rusher, scrambled to his right to his own 37-yard line, and launched the ball. It traveled an impressive 63 yards, over the Miami defenders, and into the arms of an untouched Phelan in the end zone. The catch gave Boston College a 47–45 victory. To this day, it is considered one of the greatest offensive plays in college football history.

=== Professional career ===
Phelan was selected by the New England Patriots in the fourth round (108th overall pick) in the 1985 NFL draft. A knee injury prematurely cut short his professional career.

== Personal life ==
A graduate of the Boston College class of 1985, Phelan currently works in Boston for RR Donnelley as Senior Vice President. He is the cousin of professional soccer player Pat Phelan. He currently resides in Walpole, Massachusetts. In his former community of Milford, he has a reputation of being a jovial host.
