= Flutie Flakes =

Breakfast cereal named after football quarterback Doug Flutie

- The 10th anniversary limited edition box

Nutritional value per 3/4 Cup (31 grams)
- Carbohydrates: 28 (9%)
- Sugars: 13 g
- Dietary fiber: <0 g
- Fat: 0 mg (0%)
- Saturated: 0 mg (0%)
- Protein: 1 g
- Other constituents: Quantity
- Cholesterol: 0 mg (0%)
- ^{†}Percentages estimated using US recommendations for adults.

Flutie Flakes is the name of a brand of frosted corn flakes breakfast cereal named for American football quarterback Doug Flutie.

The brand was created in 1998, after Flutie, then the starting quarterback for the Buffalo Bills, saw his popularity soar because of his scrambling, last quarter heroics and his impressive win–loss record. A large portion of the profits made from sales of Flutie Flakes were donated to the Doug Flutie Jr. Foundation for Autism, created in honor of Flutie's son who has Childhood disintegrative disorder, a very rare severe late onset form of autism spectrum disorder. The goal of the foundation is to create awareness of autism and to seek a cure.

PLB Sports and Entertainment of Pittsburgh was hired to oversee marketing, product development, packaging, and sales. The cereal was originally made by Jasper Foods, a private-label producer. Initially, PLB Sports intended to produce just 50,000 boxes, but wound up selling more than 3 million. When the millionth box came off the production line in December 1998, it was put up for auction online and was sold for over $1,400.

Flutie Flakes remained popular in the region even after Flutie was controversially benched for Rob Johnson.

Four box designs of Flutie Flakes were featured. The first edition is red and features two images of Flutie in blue Bills uniforms. The second edition, released in 1999, is blue with a picture of Flutie in a red jersey and helmet (he had previously worn red jerseys with the Boston College Eagles football team, the New England Patriots and the Calgary Stampeders). The 2000 third edition is white, blue, and red and features Flutie in a white Bills uniform. After Flutie signed with the San Diego Chargers in 2001, the third edition photo was altered to match the Chargers' color scheme and was placed on top of a navy, yellow, and white design. Additionally, the 2001 box reads "Super-Charged" above the Flutie Flakes logo, replacing the "Collector's Box" text that is featured in the three Buffalo editions of the cereal.

In 2008, Flutie Flakes were re-introduced for a limited time commemorating the 10-year anniversary. A 20th anniversary version was re-released in December 2019.

== Final run ==
In October 2026, Flutie Flakes collector's edition began its very final run with a new box design for 2026.The newly launched official website includes the cereal, tees and caps and when the final run sells through there is no restock and no second edition..

== Other products ==
The 1998 and 1999 editions of Flutie Flakes were also complemented by Flutie Flakes Chocolate Bars. The candy bars feature Flutie Flakes cereal inside milk chocolate. After being chosen to the 1999 Pro Bowl, the second edition of the chocolate bar featured a new color scheme and honors the accomplishment by making a special collector's edition of the treat.

Flutie Fruities are a brand of fruit snacks developed during Flutie's 2001 season with the Chargers.

Each edition of the cereal came with product offers on the reverse. Fans could mail in to purchase t-shirts, teddy bears, footballs, ball caps, and even CDs featuring Flutie's own band, The Flutie Gang.

PLB Sports has produced cereal brands for other celebrities, mostly football players (as of 2020, it produces branded cereals featuring JuJu Smith-Schuster, Josh Allen, Patrick Mahomes, Tyler Herro, Aaron Jones, and the late The Joy of Painting host Bob Ross, along with a line of mustards endorsed by Ed McCaffrey and sauces endorsed by Stefon Diggs). It previously produced branded cereals for baseball and hockey players. Of the various product lines PLB Sports has released, Flutie Flakes has been the longest-running, with the Allen cereal, Josh's Jaqs (a red-and-blue fruit ring cereal), being the only other to last at least three cycles. PLB founder Ty Ballou, a self-professed Pittsburgh Steelers fan, has acknowledged the debt he has to Bills Mafia for keeping his company solvent.

== Controversy ==
Flutie Flakes became the subject of a minor controversy in January 1999 when Miami Dolphins head coach Jimmy Johnson poured Flutie Flakes on the ground and invited his team to stomp on it after defeating Flutie in a playoff game; as the product was created to help individuals with autism, Flutie was upset that Johnson would use it in such a manner. Johnson issued a public apology.
