= Dakota Albritton =

American baseball player

- Born: 2000 or 2001 (age 25–26)
- Other name: "Stilts"
- Occupation: Baseball player
- Years active: 2021–present
- Known for: Tallest baseball player
- Website: thesavannahbananas.com/cast/stilts/

Dakota "Stilts" Albritton is an American baseball player for the barnstorming baseball team the Savannah Bananas based in Savannah, Georgia. He is known as the "World’s Tallest Baseball Player" and the "Tallest Pitcher in the World", according to Baseball Reference. Standing at 10-feet 9-inches tall on stilts, Albritton is the most recognized player on the team.

== Early life ==
Dakota Albritton was born to Cecil and Lisa Albritton and grew up in Ellaville, Georgia, where he attended Schley Middle High School. In a 2025 interview with reporter Tyler Boronski, Albritton said: "Growing up I played baseball my entire life and that was something me and my parents genuinely loved to do every weekend." Albritton helped lead his team to a state title game appearance during his senior year.

When he was 10 years old, Albritton received a pair of stilts as a Christmas present. "[As] a kid, I always had weird talents. I got a pair of stilts for Christmas, and the first time I hopped on them, I ran across my yard and back."

After high school, Albritton did several odd jobs building swimming pools, pipe-fitting in a paper mill, repairing vacuum pumps, and working in construction.

== Savannah Bananas ==
In an April 2025 interview with 60 Minutes, Albritton told news correspondent Lesley Stahl that his mother had set up a baseball tryout with the Savannah Bananas baseball team and told them he could walk on stilts. "Why’d you do that?" Albritton replied, "I haven’t played ball in two years." His mother told him that the tryout announcement said to "bring your weirdest talent". "[We were] looking for the most talented and entertaining players in the world," co-owner of the Savannah Bananas, Jesse Cole said, regarding the tryouts.

He had played high school baseball. Not the highest level. And he probably wasn't gonna make the team. He said, "I brought my stilts. Do you want me to wear 'em?" And I said, "Nuh-uh. Unless you can hit in 'em."

— Jesse Cole

According to Director of Baseball Operations Adam Virant, the entire tryout just "stopped." Cole later said in an interview: "We had a meeting. The coaches said: 'We can't put him on the team.' I go, 'He hits on stilts!'" Albritton signed on with the Savannah Bananas in 2021 when he was 20 years old. He plays the field, bats and pitches all while on stilts. "I’m swinging a 33-inch 30-ounce baseball bat," explains Albritton, "That means the pitcher has to throw it from my knees to my numbers, and my real knees, not the stilt knees."
