= Flutie effect =

American phenomenon named after Doug Flutie

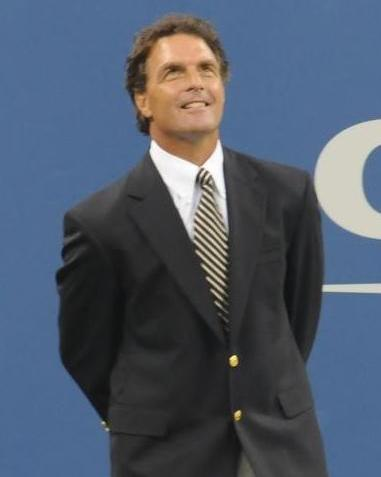
Doug Flutie, the player for whom the phenomenon is named

The Flutie effect or Flutie factor is the increase in fame of an American university caused by a successful sports team. This is named for Boston College's Doug Flutie, whose game-winning Hail Mary pass in the 1984 game against the University of Miami purportedly boosted applications to the college the following year.

== Boston College ==
Writing in the Spring 2003 edition of the Boston College Magazine, Bill McDonald, director of communications at Boston College’s Lynch School of Education determined that “Applications to BC did surge 16 percent in 1984 (from 12,414 to 14,398), and then another 12 percent (to 16,163) in 1985. But these jumps were not anomalous for BC, which in the previous decade had embarked on a program to build national enrollment using market research, a network of alumni volunteers, strategically allocated financial aid, and improvements to residence halls and academic facilities.” He also observed that “in 1997, one year after revelations about gambling resulted in a coach’s resignation, 13 student-athlete suspensions, an investigation by the NCAA, and hundreds of embarrassing media reports, applications for admission came in at 16,455, virtually unchanged from the previous year. Two years later, when applications jumped by a record 17 percent to 19,746, the surge followed a 4-7 year for football.” Going further back in history, he reported that applications had increased 9 percent in 1978, a year when BC football had its worst year ever, with a 0-11 record.

Mr. McDonald posed the question: “How does an idea like the 'Flutie factor' become sufficiently rooted that The New York Times cites it as a given without further comment and some universities invest millions of dollars in its enchanting possibilities?” He was provided with an answer by Barbara Wallraff, author of the “Word Court” column in The Atlantic Monthly: “It’s painful to fact-check everything. Media will often reprint what has been published, especially when it appears in reputable publications. ‘Flutie factor’ is a short, alliterative way to describe something that is complicated to explain. But what makes a good term is not always the literal truth.”

== Other examples ==
According to a 2009 study, applications to a university whose men's basketball team played in the first round of the NCAA Division I men's basketball tournament rose by an average of 1% the following year. Teams with greater success saw larger rises; tournament winners typically saw applications increase by 7% to 8%. As most schools did not raise enrollment after participating in the tournament, the greater number of applications caused them to be more selective in their admissions.

=== Gonzaga ===
One alleged "Flutie Effect" occurred at Gonzaga University. The school had seen its undergraduate population drop from over 4,000 in 1990 to just under 2,800 in 1998, when the school had operated at a budget deficit for several years, seen declines in its credit rating and a shrinking endowment, and had reduced its staffing. A few faculty members suggested that Gonzaga athletics drop from Division I to a lower level.

During the 1998–99 school year, Gonzaga made an unexpected run to the Elite Eight of the 1999 NCAA tournament; that August, freshman enrollment jumped to 701. The Bulldogs won two games in each of the next two NCAA Tournaments, as freshman enrollment increased to 796 in 2000 and to a then-record 979 in 2001. In 2004, Rev. Robert Spitzer, then-Gonzaga University president, said that the team's success was responsible for the school receiving the $23 million required to build the Bulldogs' current basketball home of McCarthey Athletic Center, most of which was received through major gifts.

Unlike most schools that have experienced this phenomenon, Gonzaga has been seen as continuing to reap benefits from its basketball program, even decades removed from the team's first major exposure to a national audience. In March 2017, as the Bulldogs were preparing to play in the program's first Final Four, ESPN writer Dana O'Neil said, "What has happened at Gonzaga is a lot more than the Flutie Effect." In 2003, with freshman enrollment booming, Gonzaga changed from a rolling admissions process to a more selective process with firm deadlines. This led to a noticeable increase in incoming student credentials, with median high school GPAs rising from 3.54 in 1998 to 3.71 in 2016 and median SAT scores rising from 1159 to 1290 in the same period. The McCarthey Athletic Center is only one of seven major buildings that opened on campus between 2004 and 2017, and at that time the school had started to build a new basketball practice facility and was preparing to break ground on a new performing arts center. Donations have also risen; by the time of O'Neil's piece, a fundraising campaign that had only started in 2016 had already received $226 million of its $250 million goal. Finally, undergraduate enrollment for 2016–17 was 5,160, with more than 1,200 freshmen.

=== George Mason ===
Another school alleged to have experienced the "Flutie effect" was George Mason University, following their 2005–06 basketball team's advancement to the Final Four of the 2006 NCAA Division I men's basketball tournament as an 11th seed.

=== Appalachian State ===
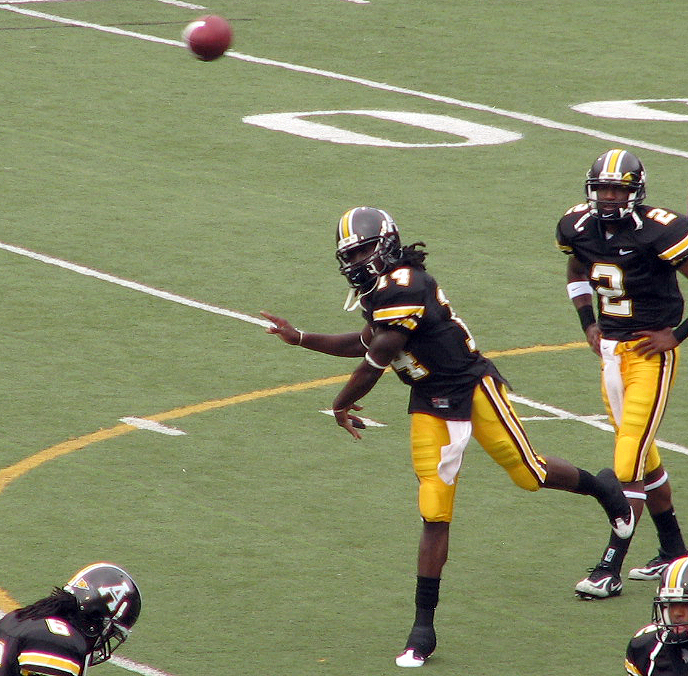
Armanti Edwards

Appalachian State University saw a "Flutie effect" in the early 2000s after winning multiple Division I FCS championships and upsetting Michigan with Armanti Edwards as their quarterback. Five years after the Michigan game, CBSSports.com writer Dennis Dodd claimed that it was "tied directly to a 17 percent increase in applicants, a 24 percent boost in attendance and a 73 percent rise in licensing royalties."

=== Boise State ===
Boise State University experienced a "Flutie effect" after their 43-42 overtime victory over Oklahoma in the 2007 Fiesta Bowl. The game capped an undefeated season and a top-5 finish by Boise State, a team not considered to be a traditional football power. Online inquiries about the school increased 135 percent, and graduate school application inquiries increased tenfold. Boise State also enrolled over 19,000 students the next fall, an all-time high.

=== Northern Iowa ===
In the 2010 NCAA tournament, the University of Northern Iowa Panthers upset top-ranked Kansas. The game and the national exposure led to massive increases in donations, website traffic, and e-commerce for the athletic department. The school's admissions office saw a 30 percent increase in calls on the Monday after the upset.

=== Butler ===
Two studies estimated that television, print, and online news coverage of Butler University's men's basketball team's 2010 and 2011 appearances in the NCAA tournament championship game resulted in additional publicity for the university worth about $1.2 billion. In an example of the "Flutie effect", applications rose by 41% after the 2010 appearance.

=== Oregon ===
Beginning in the early-2000s, the University of Oregon experienced a massive increase in incoming freshman applications and merchandise sales mainly due to the massive success of the Oregon Ducks football team and other athletic teams. The Ducks football team has experienced exponential success since the early-2000s, consistently being ranked in the top 25 national polls, winning multiple Pac-12 Conference championships, appearing in several Bowl Championship Series Bowl games, and participating in two National Championship games. For a time, they were regarded as one of the premier college football programs in the country and were annually considered a national championship contender. Furthermore, the rise to prominence of Heisman Trophy winner, Marcus Mariota, led to an increase in incoming freshman applications and merchandise sales at the school. The school also benefited from a drastic overhaul of the entire athletic department's uniforms and sports apparel, which was spearheaded by sports apparel and equipment manufacturer, Nike. Nike's headquarters are located in Oregon and company founders, Phil Knight and Bill Bowerman, are alumni of the university. The appearance, design, and quality of the Nike athletic apparel and equipment at Oregon is regarded as one of the most appealing, popular, and unique merchandise concepts in college athletics. Additionally, the construction of multiple state-of-the-art athletic training and performance facilities on campus has drastically increased campus appeal to top-notch athletic prospects and recruits, as well as incoming student applicants.

=== Auburn ===
There was a "dramatic increase" in the number of applications to Auburn University after its football team, led by Heisman Trophy winner Cam Newton, won the 2011 BCS National Championship Game.

=== Baylor ===
Baylor University reported a drastic increase in student applications after Robert Griffin III won the Heisman Trophy in 2011 and led the Bears football team to their best record in over 30 years. The Bears' football team has had continued success throughout the 2010s, winning two Big 12 Conference championships and participating in two Bowl Championship Series Bowl games. Led by head coach Art Briles, Baylor's football program has developed into one of the premier college football programs in the country. Due to the massive surge in student applications, school enrollment, and merchandise and apparel sales, Baylor drastically overhauled and refurbished the school's athletic facilities, including the construction and opening of McLane Stadium in 2014, which cost approximately $266 million to complete.

=== Virginia Commonwealth ===
Yet another "Flutie Effect" from men's basketball was experienced by Virginia Commonwealth University following the Rams' Final Four run in the 2011 NCAA tournament. The Rams basketball team, after receiving a play-in seed in the tournament, went on a legendary run defeating powerhouses Georgetown and number 1 seed Kansas, before losing to Butler in the Final Four. The school saw a 20% increase in applications after their 2011 appearance.

=== Florida Gulf Coast and Wichita State ===
Two schools experienced similar effects following runs in the 2013 NCAA tournament. Within a year of Florida Gulf Coast's Sweet Sixteen run, sales of men's basketball-related merchandise increased more than 20-fold, the total number of applications to the school increased by 36%, and out-of-state applications increased 41%. Wichita State saw applications rise by 81% after the Shockers made the Final Four.

=== Texas A&M ===
During the early 2010s, Texas A&M experienced an increase in incoming freshman applications and merchandise sales due mainly to the rise to national prominence and mainstream success of the Texas A&M Aggies football team. The Aggies were led by breakout freshman quarterback and Heisman Trophy winner Johnny Manziel. The Aggies finished with an 11-2 record and a #5 national ranking during the 2012 season, and a 9-4 record and #18 national record during the 2013 season. According to a study, Manziel was worth over $37 million in media exposure and merchandise sales and the school bookstore had sold out all 2,500 of their replica Aggies jerseys.

=== Loyola Chicago ===
Loyola University Chicago experienced significant increases in freshman applications following a surprise run to the 2018 Final Four. The school enrolled its largest freshman class ever in the 2018–19 school year, at over 2,900. While this was an increase of only 4.1% from the previous year, Loyola's admissions director told the institution's student newspaper, the Loyola Phoenix, that the full effect of the Final Four run would not be seen until the 2019–20 school year because the NCAA tournament takes place late in Loyola's admissions calendar. New visitors to the university's website increased more than four-fold during the Ramblers' upset of Tennessee during the Final Four run, and visits to the undergraduate admissions page increased by more than 50% during that same game.

== Works cited ==
- Withers, Bud (2002). BraveHearts: The Against-All-Odds Rise of Gonzaga Basketball. New York: Triumph Books. ISBN 1572434996.
