= Savannah Bananas =

Baseball team in Georgia, US

- Logo

Information
- League: Banana Ball Championship League
- Location: Savannah, Georgia
- Ballpark: Grayson Stadium
- Founded: 2016
- Nickname: Bananas
- League championships: Coastal Plain League: 3 (2016, 2021, 2022)
- Former league: Coastal Plain League (2016–2022)
- Colors: Yellow, navy blue, white, & green
- Mascot: Split
- Ownership: Fans First Entertainment (Jesse & Emily Cole)
- Manager: Tyler Gillum
- Coach: Adam Virant, Reginald Horton
- Website: thesavannahbananas.com

The Savannah Bananas are a barnstorming baseball team based in Savannah, Georgia, United States. They play a variation of baseball known as Banana Ball, which emphasizes showmanship, fan participation, and quick-paced games. The players engage in dance routines, comedic sketches, and other performances between, and often during, innings.

The team was founded in 2016 with Grayson Stadium as its home ballpark. Until 2022, the Bananas competed as a collegiate summer baseball team in the Coastal Plain League's (CPL) West division, where they won three Petitt Cup championships (2016, 2021, and 2022). In 2018, they began playing exhibition games outside of the CPL season under the Banana Ball format. In 2023, the team moved entirely to exhibition games against their partner touring teams. Since 2026, they have been a member of the Banana Ball Championship League.

== History ==
After the South Atlantic League's Savannah Sand Gnats left for Columbia, South Carolina, on September 22, 2015, the Coastal Plain League (CPL) announced Savannah as its newest team to begin play in 2016. On February 25, after a name-the-team contest, the Bananas name, logo, and colors were officially revealed.

In 2016, the Bananas ended their inaugural season as the first seed in the CPL West Division, earning home-field advantage for the first two games of the playoffs. In game one, the Bananas beat the Asheboro Copperheads, 3–2, with the first walk-off in franchise history. The Bananas then defeated the Forest City Owls, 2–0, to win the CPL West Division championship and advance to the Petitt Cup Championship. Game one of the championship was played at Grayson Stadium, and the Bananas defeated the Peninsula Pilots, 8–4. The team traveled to Hampton, Virginia, where the Pilots' 4–3 win in game two forced an all-or-nothing game three. The Bananas took home the Petitt Cup after a 9–7 win in game three. The Bananas were named the league's organization of the year in both 2016 and 2017.

On October 10, 2026, the Bananas lost Banana Bowl I to the Texas Tailgaters.

=== Introduction to Banana Ball format ===
In 2018, the team created the alternative "Banana Ball" rule set and played its first intra-squad exhibition game using the format. As the format became more popular, the team played its first official game with Banana Ball rules on June 26, 2020, while playing away games under the standard CPL rules. The owner noted that this distinction, where the Bananas were effectively two different teams playing with two different rules, confused fans who might not know what to expect at a game.

In 2020 the Party Animals debuted as the opponent in Banana Ball games, similar to the relationship between the Harlem Globetrotters and the Washington Generals. Unlike Globetrotter exhibitions, games are unscripted and competitive.

After the 2022 summer league season, the Bananas announced they were folding their collegiate amateur team and only playing Banana Ball, both in Savannah and on the road as a barnstorming team. In August of 2023, ESPN+ released a miniseries about the team, Bananaland.

As of 2026, Banana Ball has six teams of players, many of whom are former minor league and college baseball players, with former Major League Baseball athletes as occasional special guest players. The team has been featured by ESPN, The Wall Street Journal, CNN 10, Sports Illustrated, and 60 Minutes because of its sports entertainment and viral videos. The team also has over twelve million followers on TikTok, more than MLB's official account and teams.

=== Notable players ===
In 2021, the team signed Dakota Albritton. Nicknamed "Stilts" and dubbed the "World's Tallest Baseball Player" and the "Tallest Pitcher in the World", Albritton stands 10 feet, 9 inches tall on stilts and plays the field, bats, and pitches, all on stilts.

In 2023, Jocelyn Alo became the first woman to play for the Bananas, getting an at bat in one game. In 2024, the team announced that Alo had become the first female member of the Bananas, and signed a one-month contract. In August 2025, they signed Kelsie Whitmore, one of the highest-profile professional woman baseball players.

== Banana Ball world tours ==
=== Beginning tours ===
In 2021, the Bananas announced their first "world" tour called the One City World Tour, where they traveled to Mobile, Alabama, and sold out both nights in Hank Aaron Stadium with a combined crowd of over 7,000 fans.

In 2022, the Bananas added six more cities across four different states to the tour, creating a 14-game "world" tour in which all games were sellouts. While most Banana Ball games feature the Bananas versus the Party Animals, the Bananas introduced a "Challenger Series" in which they play against a different opponent. The first such series was played May 5–6 against the Kansas City Monarchs of the American Association of Professional Baseball and saw each team win one game.

The 2023 "world" tour was expanded to over 80 games, with the team implementing their new exhibition-only status. The tour started at The Ballpark of the Palm Beaches in West Palm Beach, Florida on February 17 and ended seven months later at Doubleday Field in Cooperstown, New York. It included numerous challenger games against teams such as the Charleston Dirty Birds, Southern Maryland Blue Crabs, Florence Y'alls, The MLB Players Alumni Association, and a rematch with the Kansas City Monarchs. Additionally, the Bananas played their first international opponent, the Aussie Drop Bears, a team from Australia featuring professional and collegiate players.

=== Expansion to MLB stadiums ===
The "world" tour kicked off its 2024 season at George M. Steinbrenner Field in Tampa, Florida, on February 8 and ended eight months later at LoanDepot Park in Miami, Florida, followed by a trip on a cruise ship to The Bahamas called "Bananaland at Sea". The tour also included five other MLB ballparks: Nationals Park, Washington, D.C.; Minute Maid Park in Houston; Fenway Park in Boston; Citizens Bank Park in Philadelphia; and Progressive Field in Cleveland.

=== Expansion to football stadiums ===
The Savannah Bananas announced they would play games in 40 cities in 2025, including three NFL stadiums and 17 MLB stadiums. Their first NFL stadium game was at Raymond James Stadium in Tampa, Florida, where they played in front of a sold-out crowd of 65,000. On April 26, the Bananas and the Party Animals played a game in front of 81,000 people at Clemson University's Memorial Stadium. Tickets to the games at Coors Field were available via a lottery and sold out in less than two hours. The attendance of more than 50,000 fans was the highest of any MLB stadium in the Bananas history. Some events were starting to be televised by ESPN.

For 2026, the Bananas announced that the Banana Ball Championship League (BBCL) would play in 75 stadiums (ranging from MLB to NFL) in 45 states in front of over 3.2 million fans.

== Attendance ==
In their inaugural 2016 season, the Savannah Bananas ranked second in average attendance among 160 summer collegiate teams, as reported by Ballpark Digest. The Bananas recorded over 500,000 total fans in attendance on their Banana Ball World Tour in 2023. The team drew their largest attendance on May 2, 2026, with 102,000 spectators at Kyle Field in College Station, Texas, a football stadium. Fans First Entertainment, the owners of the Bananas, manage their own ticketing and merchandising, meaning they do not add fees for fans to the price of tickets.

== Current roster ==
Savannah Bananas roster
Active roster		Coaching staff
Pitchers: 11 Austin Drury LHP; 12 Kyle Luigs RHP; 20 Grant Besser LHP; 21 Jacob Bazala RHP; 24 Derek Klena RHP; 26 Tyler Wehrle RHP; 28 Livan Reinoso RHP/UTL; 30 Connor Harris RHP; 31 Trystan Levesque LHP; 33 Kelsie Whitmore RHP; 88 Noah Niznik LHP; Designated hitters: 19 Dan Oberst DH; 22 JT Sokolove DR; Utility players: 4 Kyle "KJ" Jackson UTL; 14 Dakota "Stilts" Albritton UTL; 16 Charlie Culberson UTL; 18 Danny Hosley UTL; 27 Stephen DiTomaso UTL	Catchers: 1 Bill Leroy C; 3 Bryce Grizzaffi C; Infielders: 6 Ryan Cox SS; 8 Jackson Olson 2B; 10 Alex "Ziggy" Ziegler 1B; Outfielders: 2 Reese Alexiades; 5 DR Meadows; 7 Ty Jackson; 15 RobertAnthony Cruz LF; 61 Kenshi Sugiya	Manager: 66 Tyler Gillum Head Coach; Coaches: 13 Bryce Stober; 23 Reginald Horton Inspiration Coach; 49 Ryan Kellogg Pitching Coach; Disabled list; ‡ Inactive list; § Suspended list; updated November 20, 2026

== Television coverage ==
Banana Ball made its national television debut in 2022 through a six-game agreement with ESPN. One game aired on ESPN2 and the others on ESPN+. The agreement returned in 2023 with one game on ESPN2 and two others on ESPN+.

The Bananas significantly expanded their TV coverage in the 2024 season. In April 2024, the Bananas announced that 19 games would air on Stadium and Bally Live. In July, they announced a five-game agreement with ESPN. For the first time, three games aired on ESPN with two others airing on ESPN2 as part of the annual ESPN8 The Ocho event. In August, the Bananas announced an agreement with TNT Sports to exclusively air five games on TruTV.

In 2025, the Bananas announced a 10-game agreement with ESPN. For the first time, all 10 will be simulcast on Disney+ and ESPN+ along with airing on ESPN or ESPN2. It was later announced that two additional games will air only on ESPN+ and Disney+. Other games will continue to stream on Stadium and Bally Sports Live. In July, the Bananas announced one-game agreements with The Roku Channel and The CW. The game on The CW was the first time a Bananas game has aired over-the-air. Later in July, the Bananas announced an agreement with TNT Sports to air 19 games on TruTV and HBO Max beginning August 16. For the first time, this agreement includes the Banana Ball Tour Championship.

The Savannah Bananas retained the same partners for the 2026 season, while expanding the number of televised Banana ball games not including the Savannah Bananas. Twenty-five games will air on ESPN platforms, including the first ever game on ABC, with all games streaming on Disney+ and ESPN Unlimited. Additionally, TruTV and HBO Max will air 15 games, The CW will air six games, and the Roku Channel will air five games.

== Notable alumni ==
Numerous former Bananas have been drafted by MLB clubs, but only the following have reached the major leagues:

- Braden Shewmake – Infielder who played for the Bananas in 2016. He was selected 21st overall by the Atlanta Braves in the 2019 Major League Baseball draft and made his MLB debut in 2023.
- Beau Sulser – Right-handed pitcher who played for the Bananas in 2016. He debuted in MLB with the Pittsburgh Pirates in 2022 and later pitched for the Baltimore Orioles.
- Rylan Bannon – Infielder who played for the Bananas in 2016 before debuting with the Baltimore Orioles in 2022. He later appeared in MLB for the Houston Astros.
- Cade Marlowe – Outfielder who played for the Savannah Bananas in 2018 before making his MLB debut with the Seattle Mariners in 2023. He gained national attention after hitting a grand slam early in his major league career.
- Brett Wisely – Infielder who played for the Bananas in 2019. Drafted by the Tampa Bay Rays, he made his MLB debut with the San Francisco Giants in 2023.
- Tristan Peters – Outfielder who played for the Savannah Bananas in 2021 during the organization's Coastal Plain League era. He was selected by the Milwaukee Brewers in the seventh round of the 2021 Major League Baseball draft, made his MLB debut with the Tampa Bay Rays in 2025, and was later traded to the Chicago White Sox.
- Hayden Harris – Left-handed pitcher who appeared for the Savannah Bananas' Banana Ball team in 2022. He made his MLB debut with the Atlanta Braves in 2025, becoming the first player from the Banana Ball era to reach the major leagues.
