= The Magic of Oil Painting =

Instructional television show hosted by painter Bill Alexander

- Starring: Bill Alexander
- Country of origin: United States
- Original language: English
- No. of episodes: 117

Original release
- Network: PBS
- Release: February 18, 1974 – May 10, 1982

Related
- The Joy of Painting

The Magic of Oil Painting is an American half-hour instructional television show hosted by painter Bill Alexander which ran from February 18, 1974 to May 10, 1982 on PBS, produced by member station KOCE in Huntington Beach, California. In each episode, Alexander taught techniques for landscape oil painting, completing a painting in each session, painting in a 16th-century style called alla-prima, now known as wet-on-wet. He was invited to record a pilot in late 1973 for KOCE. Alexander earned an Emmy for the show in 1979, making him the first painter to earn the award. The show is known for inspiring The Joy of Painting hosted by Bob Ross.

== Episodes ==
- A Morning Kind of Mountain (February 18, 1974)
- After the Storm (February 25, 1974)
- Along the Moulon Rouge (March 4, 1974)
- Autumn Lake (March 11, 1974)
- Canadian Canyon (March 18, 1974)
- Country Road (March 25, 1974)
- Glacier Bay (April 1, 1974)
- Green Rain Forest (April 8, 1974)
- Hillgrueber's Farm (April 15, 1974)
- Mountain Island (April 22, 1974)
- Rain (April 29, 1974)
- Solitude (May 6, 1974)
- Winter Shack (May 13, 1974)
- Alpine Junction (February 17, 1975)
- Craggy Pass (February 24, 1975)
- Candle on Black (March 3, 1975)
- Frozen Citadel (March 10, 1975)
- Looking for Gold (March 17, 1975)
- Miller's Colony (March 24, 1975)
- Mountain River (March 31, 1975)
- Mountain Road (April 7, 1975)
- Mr. Brown's Farm (April 14, 1975)
- Neptunes Bateau (April 21, 1975)
- Silver Plume Lake (April 28, 1975)
- Steel Lake (May 5, 1975)
- Autumn Colors (May 12, 1975)
- Along the Swan River (February 16, 1976)
- Autumn Dream (February 23, 1976)
- Beyond the Arctic Circle (March 1, 1976)
- Columbia River Gorge (March 8, 1976)
- Fall River (March 15, 1976)
- Haystack Rock (March 22, 1976)
- Holiday Mountain (March 29, 1976)
- Mountain Water Runoff (April 5, 1976)
- Seascape (April 12, 1976)
- The Homestead (April 19, 1976)
- To The Summit (April 26, 1976)
- Vase by Knife (May 3, 1976)
- Waterfall and Rapids (May 10, 1976)
- Alpine Lagoon (February 21, 1977)
- At The Beach (February 28, 1977)
- Bills Covered Bridge (March 7, 1977)
- Black Canvas Still Life (March 14, 1977)
- City Silhouette (March 21, 1977)
- Don't Fence Me In (March 28, 1977)
- Grand Canyon (April 4, 1977)
- Lake Kabetogama (April 11, 1977)
- Midnight Roses (April 18, 1977)
- Sunset I (April 25, 1977)
- Sylvan Path (May 2, 1977)
- Texas Scene (May 9, 1977)
- Thousand Island Lake (May 16, 1977)
- Colorado River Canyon (February 20, 1978)
- Desert Canyon (February 27, 1978)
- Falling Leaves (March 6, 1978)
- Falling Water (March 13, 1978)
- Grapes and a Jug II (March 20, 1978)
- Greener Pastures (March 27, 1978)
- Knife Mountain (April 3, 1978)
- Mountain Lake and Island (April 10, 1978)
- Near Lassen CA (April 17, 1978)
- Red Sailboat (April 24, 1978)
- Still Life in Vase (May 1, 1978)
- Stormy Ocean (May 8, 1978)
- Swamp Two (May 15, 1978)
- Candle on Black (Portrait) (February 19, 1979)
- Fall Touches (February 26, 1979)
- Lower Falls I (March 5, 1979)
- Montana de Oro (March 12, 1979)
- Natures Bounty (March 19, 1979)
- Rolling Mist (March 26, 1979)
- Sunset Beach (April 2, 1979)
- Tumalo Trail (April 9, 1979)
- Western Skies (April 16, 1979)
- West Virginia Mountains (April 23, 1979)
- Winter Day (April 30, 1979)
- Winter Lake (May 6, 1979)
- Winter Scene (May 13, 1979)
- Adirondack Pleasure (February 18, 1980)
- Apple Valley (February 25, 1980)
- Autumn Dreams (March 3, 1980)
- Evening At Eagle Lake (March 10, 1980)
- Grand Marais Pines (March 17, 1980)
- Lac du Flambeau (March 24, 1980)
- Merced River Yosemite (March 31, 1980)
- Moonlight Mirage (April 7, 1980)
- Secluded Cabin (April 14, 1980)
- Snowy Mountain Road (April 21, 1980)
- Still Life and Grapefruit (April 28, 1980)
- Sunlight I (May 5, 1980)
- West Virginia River (May 12, 1980)
- Bill's Mountain Waterfall (February 16, 1981)
- Dell's Pond (February 23, 1981)
- Down By The Riverside (March 2, 1981)
- Forest Hollow (March 9, 1981)
- Gorgeous Gorge (March 16, 1981)
- Island Eve (March 23, 1981)
- Jeffrey Pine (March 30, 1981)
- Marigold on Black (April 6, 1981)
- Mountain in the Clouds (April 13, 1981)
- Mount Baker (April 20, 1981)
- Quetico Wilderness (April 27, 1981)
- Rain Forest (May 4, 1981)
- Robin Hood Bay (May 11, 1981)
- Big Mountain (February 15, 1982)
- Butterfly (February 22, 1982)
- Daisies with a Knife (March 1, 1982)
- Farm Scene (March 8, 1982)
- Hidden Falls (March 15, 1982)
- Jar Still Life (March 22, 1982)
- Lonely Pine (March 29, 1982)
- Lost Lagoon (April 5, 1982)
- Moonlit Splendor (April 12, 1982)
- Mountain Paradise (April 19, 1982)
- Silver Falls (April 26, 1982)
- The Wall (May 3, 1982)
- Winter Sky (May 10, 1982)
