= List of The Joy of Painting episodes =

The Joy of Painting is an American half-hour instructional television show created and hosted by painter Bob Ross which ran from January 11, 1983, to May 17, 1994.

== Series overview ==
Season	Episodes	Originally aired	
Season	Episodes	Season premiere	Season finale
1	13	January 11, 1983	March 29, 1983
2	13	August 31, 1983	November 23, 1983
3	13	January 4, 1984	March 29, 1984
4	13	September 5, 1984	November 28, 1984
5	13	January 2, 1985	March 27, 1985
6	13	May 1, 1985	July 23, 1985
7	13	October 2, 1985	December 27, 1985
8	13	January 2, 1986	March 27, 1986
9	13	April 30, 1986	July 23, 1986
10	13	September 3, 1986	November 26, 1986
11	13	December 31, 1986	March 25, 1987
12	13	April 29, 1987	July 22, 1987
13	13	September 2, 1987	November 25, 1987
14	13	December 30, 1987	March 23, 1988
15	13	April 27, 1988	July 20, 1988
16	13	August 17, 1988	November 9, 1988
17	13	January 4, 1989	March 29, 1989
18	13	July 5, 1989	September 27, 1989
19	13	January 3, 1990	March 28, 1990
20	13	April 4, 1990	June 27, 1990
21	13	September 5, 1990	November 28, 1990
22	13	January 1, 1991	March 26, 1991
23	13	September 3, 1991	November 26, 1991
24	13	January 7, 1992	March 31, 1992
25	13	August 25, 1992	November 17, 1992
26	13	December 1, 1992	February 23, 1993
27	13	March 2, 1993	May 20, 1993
28	13	May 25, 1993	August 17, 1993
29	13	August 24, 1993	November 16, 1993
30	13	November 23, 1993	February 15, 1994
31	13	February 22, 1994	May 17, 1994
32	13	May 3, 2024	July 26, 2024
33	13	July 4, 2025	September 26, 2025
34	13	July 9, 2026	TBD

== Episodes ==
=== Season 1 (1983) ===
The Joy of Painting aired for 403 half-hour episodes and 31 seasons, lasting from 1983 to 1994. The first season of The Joy of Painting was mostly aired on PBS stations across the East Coast, resulting in a smaller initial audience. Season 1 was produced at WNVC in Fairfax, Virginia and featured several stylistic differences from the more well-known format introduced in Season 2: Ross wore tinted glasses in every episode, the opening sequence featured a painting of a sunset as the text "THE JOY OF PAINTING WITH BOB ROSS" appeared, light instrumental background music played throughout each episode, and an acoustic guitar tune, heard only at the end of the episode during the closing credits, in which the closing credits appeared over a painting of the sunset, which morphed into a book called "Experience The Joy of Painting with Bob Ross". Ross had also not yet perfected his on-camera persona, and some of his hallmarks were not yet present.

No. overall	No. in season	Title	Original release date
1	1	"A Walk in the Woods"	January 11, 1983
2	2	"Mount McKinley"	January 11, 1983
3	3	"Ebony Sunset"	January 18, 1983
4	4	"Winter Mist"	January 25, 1983
5	5	"Quiet Stream"	February 1, 1983
6	6	"Winter Moon"	February 8, 1983
7	7	"Autumn Mountain"	February 15, 1983
8	8	"Peaceful Valley"	February 22, 1983
9	9	"Seascape"	March 1, 1983
10	10	"Mountain Lake"	March 8, 1983
11	11	"Winter Glow"	March 15, 1983
12	12	"Snowfall"	March 22, 1983
13	13	"Final Reflections"	March 29, 1983

=== Season 2 (1983) ===
Now with a national audience, The Joy of Painting was produced by WIPB in Muncie, Indiana. WIPB continued producing The Joy of Painting until the show's ending in 1994.

No. overall	No. in season	Title	Original release date
14	1	"Meadow Lake"	August 31, 1983
15	2	"Winter Sun"	September 7, 1983
16	3	"Ebony Sea"	September 14, 1983
17	4	"Shades of Gray"	September 21, 1983
18	5	"Autumn Splendor"	September 28, 1983
19	6	"Black River"	October 5, 1983
20	7	"Brown Mountain"	October 12, 1983
21	8	"Reflections"	October 19, 1983
22	9	"Black & White Seascape"	October 26, 1983
23	10	"Lazy River"	November 2, 1983
24	11	"Black Waterfall"	November 9, 1983
25	12	"Mountain Waterfall"	November 16, 1983
26	13	"Final Grace"	November 23, 1983

=== Season 3 (1984) ===
No. overall	No. in season	Title	Original release date
27	1	"Mountain Retreat"	January 4, 1984
28	2	"Blue Moon"	January 11, 1984
29	3	"Bubbling Stream"	January 18, 1984
30	4	"Winter Night"	January 25, 1984
31	5	"Distant Hills"	February 1, 1984
32	6	"Covered Bridge"	February 8, 1984
33	7	"Quiet Inlet"	February 15, 1984
34	8	"Night Light"	February 22, 1984
35	9	"The Old Mill"	March 1, 1984
36	10	"Campfire"	March 8, 1984
37	11	"Rustic Barn"	March 15, 1984
38	12	"Hidden Lake"	March 22, 1984
39	13	"Peaceful Waters"	March 29, 1984

=== Season 4 (1984) ===
No. overall	No. in season	Title	Original release date
40	1	"Purple Splendor"	September 5, 1984
41	2	"Tranquil Valley"	September 12, 1984
42	3	"Majestic Mountains"	September 19, 1984
43	4	"Winter Sawscape"	September 26, 1984
44	5	"Evening Seascape"	October 3, 1984
45	6	"Warm Summer Day"	October 10, 1984
46	7	"Cabin in the Woods"	October 17, 1984
47	8	"Wetlands"	October 24, 1984
48	9	"Cool Waters"	October 31, 1984
49	10	"Quiet Woods"	November 7, 1984
50	11	"Northwest Majesty"	November 14, 1984
51	12	"Autumn Days"	November 21, 1984
52	13	"Mountain Challenge"	November 28, 1984

=== Season 5 (1985) ===
No. overall	No. in season	Title	Original release date
53	1	"Mountain Waterfall"	January 2, 1985
54	2	"Twilight Meadow"	January 9, 1985
55	3	"Mountain Blossoms"	January 16, 1985
Special guest: Dana Jester
56	4	"Winter Stillness"	January 23, 1985
57	5	"Quiet Pond"	January 30, 1985
58	6	"Ocean Sunrise"	February 6, 1985
Special guest: Audrey Golden
59	7	"Bubbling Brook"	February 13, 1985
60	8	"Arizona Splendor"	February 20, 1985
61	9	"Anatomy of a Wave"	February 27, 1985
Special guest: Joyce Ortner
62	10	"The Windmill"	March 6, 1985
63	11	"Autumn Glory"	March 13, 1985
64	12	"Indian Girl"	March 20, 1985
65	13	"Meadow Stream"	March 27, 1985

=== Season 6 (1985) ===
No. overall	No. in season	Title	Original release date
66	1	"Blue River"	May 1, 1985
67	2	"Nature's Edge"	May 8, 1985
68	3	"Morning Mist"	May 15, 1985
69	4	"Whispering Stream"	May 22, 1985
70	5	"Secluded Forest"	May 29, 1985
71	6	"Snow Trail"	June 5, 1985
72	7	"Arctic Beauty"	June 12, 1985
73	8	"Horizons West"	June 19, 1985
74	9	"High Chateau"	June 26, 1985
75	10	"Country Life"	July 2, 1985
76	11	"Western Expanse"	July 9, 1985
77	12	"Marshlands"	July 16, 1985
78	13	"Blaze of Color"	July 23, 1985

=== Season 7 (1985) ===
No. overall	No. in season	Title	Original release date
79	1	"Winter Cabin"	October 2, 1985
80	2	"Secluded Lake"	October 9, 1985
81	3	"Evergreen at Sunset"	October 16, 1985
82	4	"Mountain Cabin"	October 23, 1985
83	5	"Portrait of Sally"	October 30, 1985
Special guest: Ben Stahl
84	6	"Misty Waterfall"	November 6, 1985
85	7	"Barn at Sunset"	November 13, 1985
86	8	"Mountain Splendor"	November 20, 1985
87	9	"Lake by Mountain"	November 27, 1985
88	10	"Mountain Glory"	December 6, 1985
89	11	"Grey Winter"	December 13, 1985
90	12	"Dock Scene"	December 20, 1985
91	13	"Dark Waterfall"	December 27, 1985

=== Season 8 (1986) ===
No. overall	No. in season	Title	Original release date
92	1	"Misty Rolling Hills"	January 2, 1986
93	2	"Lakeside Cabin"	January 9, 1986
94	3	"Warm Winter Day"	January 16, 1986
95	4	"Waterside Way"	January 23, 1986
96	5	"Hunter's Haven"	January 30, 1986
97	6	"Bubbling Mountain Brook"	February 6, 1986
98	7	"Winter Hideaway"	February 13, 1986
99	8	"Foot of the Mountain"	February 20, 1986
100	9	"Majestic Pine"	February 27, 1986
101	10	"Cactus at Sunset"	March 6, 1986
102	11	"Mountain Range"	March 13, 1986
103	12	"Lonely Retreat"	March 20, 1986
104	13	"Northern Lights"	March 27, 1986

=== Season 9 (1986) ===
No. overall	No. in season	Title	Original release date
105	1	"Winter Evergreens"	April 30, 1986
106	2	"Surf's Up"	May 7, 1986
107	3	"Red Sunset"	May 14, 1986
108	4	"Meadow Road"	May 21, 1986
109	5	"Winter Oval"	May 28, 1986
110	6	"Secluded Beach"	June 4, 1986
111	7	"Forest Hills"	June 11, 1986
112	8	"Little House by the Road"	June 18, 1986
113	9	"Mountain Pass"	June 25, 1986
114	10	"Country Charm"	July 2, 1986
115	11	"Nature's Paradise"	July 9, 1986
116	12	"Mountain by the Sea"	July 16, 1986
117	13	"Mountain Hideaway"	July 23, 1986

=== Season 10 (1986) ===
No. overall	No. in season	Title	Original release date
118	1	"Towering Peaks"	September 3, 1986
119	2	"Cabin at Sunset"	September 10, 1986
120	3	"Twin Falls"	September 17, 1986
121	4	"Secluded Bridge"	September 24, 1986
122	5	"Ocean Breeze"	October 1, 1986
123	6	"Autumn Woods"	October 8, 1986
124	7	"Winter Solitude"	October 15, 1986
125	8	"Golden Sunset"	October 22, 1986
126	9	"Mountain Oval"	October 29, 1986
127	10	"Ocean Sunset"	November 5, 1986
128	11	"Triple View"	November 12, 1986
129	12	"Winter Frost"	November 19, 1986
130	13	"Lakeside Cabin"	November 26, 1986

=== Season 11 (1986–1987) ===
No. overall	No. in season	Title	Original release date
131	1	"Mountain Stream"	December 31, 1986
132	2	"Country Cabin"	January 7, 1987
133	3	"Daisy Delight"	January 14, 1987
134	4	"Hidden Stream"	January 21, 1987
135	5	"Towering Glacier"	January 28, 1987
136	6	"Oval Barn"	February 4, 1987
137	7	"Lakeside Path"	February 11, 1987
138	8	"Sunset Oval"	February 18, 1987
139	9	"Winter Barn"	February 25, 1987
140	10	"Sunset Over the Waves"	March 4, 1987
141	11	"Golden Glow"	March 11, 1987
142	12	"Roadside Barn"	March 18, 1987
143	13	"Happy Accident"	March 25, 1987

=== Season 12 (1987) ===
No. overall	No. in season	Title	Original release date
144	1	"Golden Knoll"	April 29, 1987
145	2	"Mountain Reflections"	May 6, 1987
146	3	"Secluded Mountain"	May 13, 1987
147	4	"Bright Autumn Trees"	May 20, 1987
148	5	"Black Seascape"	May 27, 1987
149	6	"Steep Mountains"	June 3, 1987
150	7	"Quiet Mountain River"	June 10, 1987
151	8	"Evening Waterfall"	June 17, 1987
152	9	"Tropical Seascape"	June 24, 1987
153	10	"Mountain at Sunset"	July 1, 1987
154	11	"Soft Mountain Glow"	July 8, 1987
155	12	"Mountain in an Oval"	July 15, 1987
156	13	"Winter Mountain"	July 22, 1987

=== Season 13 (1987) ===
No. overall	No. in season	Title	Original release date
157	1	"Rolling Hills"	September 2, 1987
158	2	"Frozen Solitude"	September 9, 1987
159	3	"Meadow Brook"	September 16, 1987
160	4	"Evening Sunset"	September 23, 1987
161	5	"Mountain View"	September 30, 1987
162	6	"Hidden Creek"	October 7, 1987
163	7	"Peaceful Haven"	October 14, 1987
164	8	"Mountain Exhibition"	October 21, 1987
165	9	"Emerald Waters"	October 28, 1987
166	10	"Mountain Summit"	November 4, 1987
167	11	"Cabin Hideaway"	November 11, 1987
168	12	"Oval Essence"	November 18, 1987
169	13	"Lost Lake"	November 25, 1987

=== Season 14 (1987–1988) ===
No. overall	No. in season	Title	Original release date
170	1	"Distant Mountains"	December 30, 1987
171	2	"Meadow Brook Surprise"	January 6, 1988
172	3	"Mountain Moonlight Oval"	January 13, 1988
173	4	"Snowy Solitude"	January 20, 1988
174	5	"Mountain River"	January 27, 1988
175	6	"Graceful Mountains"	February 3, 1988
176	7	"Windy Waves"	February 10, 1988
177	8	"On a Clear Day"	February 17, 1988
178	9	"Riverside Escape Oval"	February 24, 1988
179	10	"Surprising Falls"	March 2, 1988
180	11	"Shadow Pond"	March 9, 1988
181	12	"Misty Forest Oval"	March 16, 1988
182	13	"Natural Wonder"	March 23, 1988

=== Season 15 (1988) ===
No. overall	No. in season	Title	Original release date
183	1	"Splendor of Winter"	April 27, 1988
184	2	"Colors of Nature"	May 4, 1988
185	3	"Grandpa's Barn"	May 11, 1988
186	4	"Peaceful Reflections"	May 18, 1988
187	5	"Hidden Winter Moon Oval"	May 25, 1988
188	6	"Waves of Wonder"	June 1, 1988
189	7	"Cabin by the Pond"	June 8, 1988
190	8	"Fall Stream"	June 15, 1988
191	9	"Christmas Eve Snow"	June 22, 1988
192	10	"Forest Dawn Oval"	June 29, 1988
193	11	"Pathway to Autumn"	July 6, 1988
194	12	"Deep Forest Lake"	July 13, 1988
195	13	"Peaks of Majesty"	July 20, 1988

=== Season 16 (1988) ===
No. overall	No. in season	Title	Original release date
196	1	"Two Seasons"	August 17, 1988
197	2	"Nestled Cabin"	August 24, 1988
198	3	"Wintertime Discovery"	August 31, 1988
199	4	"Mountain Mirage"	September 7, 1988
200	5	"Double Oval Fantasy"	September 14, 1988
201	6	"Contemplative Lady"	September 21, 1988
Special guest: John Thamm (Bob Ross's former instructor)
202	7	"Deep Woods"	September 28, 1988
203	8	"High Tide"	October 5, 1988
204	9	"Barn in Snow Oval"	October 12, 1988
205	10	"That Time of Year"	October 19, 1988
Special guest: Steve Ross (Bob's son)
206	11	"Waterfall Wonder"	October 26, 1988
Footage with Grand Ole Opry regular Hank Snow and announcer Grant Turner
207	12	"Mighty Mountain Lake"	November 2, 1988
208	13	"Wooded Stream Oval"	November 9, 1988

=== Season 17 (1989) ===
No. overall	No. in season	Title	Original release date
209	1	"Golden Mist Oval"	January 4, 1989
210	2	"Old Place Home"	January 11, 1989
211	3	"Soothing Vista"	January 18, 1989
212	4	"Stormy Seas"	January 25, 1989
213	5	"Country Time"	February 1, 1989
214	6	"A Mild Winter's Day"	February 8, 1989
215	7	"Spectacular Waterfall"	February 15, 1989
216	8	"View From the Park"	February 22, 1989
217	9	"Lake View"	March 1, 1989
218	10	"Old Country Mill"	March 8, 1989
219	11	"Morning Walk"	March 15, 1989
220	12	"Nature's Splendor"	March 22, 1989
221	13	"Mountain Beauty"	March 29, 1989

=== Season 18 (1989) ===
No. overall	No. in season	Title	Original release date
222	1	"Half Oval Vignette"	July 5, 1989
223	2	"Absolutely Autumn"	July 12, 1989
224	3	"Mountain Seclusion"	July 19, 1989
225	4	"Crimson Oval"	July 26, 1989
226	5	"Autumn Exhibition"	August 2, 1989
227	6	"Majestic Peaks"	August 9, 1989
228	7	"Golden Morning Mist"	August 16, 1989
229	8	"Winter Lace"	August 23, 1989
230	9	"Seascape Fantasy"	August 30, 1989
231	10	"Double Oval Stream"	September 6, 1989
232	11	"Enchanted Forest"	September 13, 1989
233	12	"Southwest Serenity"	September 20, 1989
234	13	"Rippling Waters"	September 27, 1989

=== Season 19 (1990) ===
No. overall	No. in season	Title	Original release date
235	1	"Snowfall Magic"	January 3, 1990
236	2	"Quiet Mountain Lake"	January 10, 1990
237	3	"Final Embers of Sunlight"	January 17, 1990
238	4	"Snowy Morn"	January 24, 1990
239	5	"Camper's Haven"	January 31, 1990
240	6	"Waterfall in the Woods"	February 7, 1990
241	7	"Covered Bridge Oval"	February 14, 1990
242	8	"Scenic Seclusion"	February 21, 1990
243	9	"Ebb Tide"	February 28, 1990
244	10	"After the Rain"	March 7, 1990
245	11	"Winter Elegance"	March 14, 1990
246	12	"Evening's Peace"	March 21, 1990
247	13	"Valley of Tranquility"	March 28, 1990

=== Season 20 (1990) ===
No. overall	No. in season	Title	Original release date
248	1	"Mystic Mountain"	April 4, 1990
249	2	"New Day's Dawn"	April 11, 1990
250	3	"Pastel Winter"	April 18, 1990
251	4	"Hazy Day"	April 25, 1990
252	5	"Divine Elegance"	May 2, 1990
253	6	"Cliffside"	May 9, 1990
254	7	"Autumn Fantasy"	May 16, 1990
255	8	"Old Oak Tree"	May 23, 1990
256	9	"Winter Paradise"	May 30, 1990
257	10	"Days Gone By"	June 6, 1990
258	11	"Change of Seasons"	June 13, 1990
259	12	"Hidden Delight"	June 20, 1990
260	13	"Double Take"	June 27, 1990

=== Season 21 (1990) ===
No. overall	No. in season	Title	Original release date
261	1	"Valley View"	September 5, 1990
262	2	"Tranquil Dawn"	September 12, 1990
263	3	"Royal Majesty"	September 19, 1990
264	4	"Serenity"	September 26, 1990
265	5	"Cabin at Trail’s End"	October 3, 1990
266	6	"Mountain Rhapsody"	October 10, 1990
267	7	"Wilderness Cabin"	October 17, 1990
268	8	"By the Sea"	October 24, 1990
269	9	"Indian Summer"	October 31, 1990
270	10	"Blue Winter"	November 7, 1990
271	11	"Desert Glow"	November 14, 1990
272	12	"Lone Mountain"	November 21, 1990
273	13	"Florida's Glory"	November 28, 1990

=== Season 22 (1991) ===
No. overall	No. in season	Title	Original release date
274	1	"Autumn Images"	January 1, 1991
275	2	"Hint of Springtime"	January 8, 1991
276	3	"Around the Bend"	January 15, 1991
277	4	"Countryside Oval"	January 22, 1991
278	5	"Russet Winter"	January 29, 1991
279	6	"Purple Haze"	February 5, 1991
280	7	"Dimensions"	February 12, 1991
281	8	"Deep Wilderness Home"	February 19, 1991
282	9	"Haven in the Valley"	February 26, 1991
283	10	"Wintertime Blues"	March 5, 1991
284	11	"Pastel Seascape"	March 12, 1991
285	12	"Country Creek"	March 19, 1991
286	13	"Silent Forest"	March 26, 1991

=== Season 23 (1991) ===
No. overall	No. in season	Title	Original release date
287	1	"Frosty Winter Morn"	September 3, 1991
288	2	"Forest Edge"	September 10, 1991
289	3	"Mountain Ridge Lake"	September 17, 1991
290	4	"Reflections of Gold"	September 24, 1991
291	5	"Quiet Cove"	October 1, 1991
292	6	"River's Peace"	October 8, 1991
293	7	"At Dawn's Light"	October 15, 1991
294	8	"Valley Waterfall"	October 22, 1991
295	9	"Toward Day's End"	October 29, 1991
296	10	"Falls in the Glen"	November 5, 1991
297	11	"Frozen Beauty in Vignette"	November 12, 1991
298	12	"Crimson Tide"	November 19, 1991
299	13	"Winter Bliss"	November 26, 1991

=== Season 24 (1992) ===
No. overall	No. in season	Title	Original release date
300	1	"Grey Mountain"	January 7, 1992
301	2	"Wayside Pond"	January 14, 1992
302	3	"Teton Winter"	January 21, 1992
303	4	"Little Home in the Meadow"	January 28, 1992
304	5	"Pretty Autumn Day"	February 4, 1992
305	6	"Mirrored Images"	February 11, 1992
306	7	"Back-Country Path"	February 18, 1992
307	8	"Graceful Waterfall"	February 25, 1992
308	9	"Icy Lake"	March 3, 1992
309	10	"Rowboat on the Beach"	March 10, 1992
310	11	"Portrait of Winter"	March 17, 1992
311	12	"Footbridge"	March 24, 1992
312	13	"Snowbound Cabin"	March 31, 1992

=== Season 25 (1992) ===
No. overall	No. in season	Title	Original release date
313	1	"Hide-a-Way Cove"	August 25, 1992
314	2	"Enchanted Falls Oval"	September 1, 1992
315	3	"Not Quite Spring"	September 8, 1992
316	4	"Splashes of Autumn"	September 15, 1992
317	5	"Summer in the Mountains"	September 22, 1992
318	6	"Oriental Falls"	September 29, 1992
319	7	"Autumn Palette"	October 6, 1992
320	8	"Cypress Swamp"	October 13, 1992
321	9	"Downstream View"	October 20, 1992
322	10	"Just Before the Storm"	October 27, 1992
323	11	"Fisherman's Paradise"	November 3, 1992
324	12	"Desert Hues"	November 10, 1992
325	13	"The Property Line"	November 17, 1992

=== Season 26 (1992-1993) ===
No. overall	No. in season	Title	Original release date
326	1	"In the Stillness of Morning"	December 1, 1992
327	2	"Delightful Meadow Home"	December 8, 1992
328	3	"First Snow"	December 15, 1992
329	4	"Lake in the Valley"	December 22, 1992
330	5	"A Trace of Spring"	December 29, 1992
331	6	"An Arctic Winter Day"	January 5, 1993
332	7	"Snow Birch"	January 12, 1993
333	8	"Early Autumn"	January 19, 1993
334	9	"Tranquil Wooded Stream"	January 26, 1993
335	10	"Purple Mountain Range"	February 2, 1993
336	11	"Storm's a Comin'"	February 9, 1993
337	12	"Sunset Aglow"	February 16, 1993
338	13	"Evening at the Falls"	February 23, 1993

=== Season 27 (1993) ===
No. overall	No. in season	Title	Original release date
339	1	"Twilight Beauty"	March 2, 1993
340	2	"Angler's Haven"	March 9, 1993
341	3	"Rustic Winter Woods"	March 16, 1993
342	4	"Wilderness Falls"	March 23, 1993
343	5	"Winter at the Farm"	March 30, 1993
344	6	"Daisies at Dawn"	April 6, 1993
345	7	"A Spectacular View"	April 13, 1993
346	8	"Daybreak"	April 20, 1993
347	9	"Island Paradise"	April 27, 1993
348	10	"Sunlight in the Shadows"	May 4, 1993
349	11	"Splendor of a Snowy Winter"	May 11, 1993
350	12	"Forest River"	May 18, 1993
351	13	"Golden Glow of Morning"	May 20, 1993

=== Season 28 (1993) ===
No. overall	No. in season	Title	Original release date
352	1	"Fisherman's Trail"	May 25, 1993
353	2	"A Warm Winter"	June 1, 1993
After painting the canvas to resemble wood, Ross paints a landscape featuring the titular trail, along with mountains, trees, water, and shrubbery, omitting the sky.
354	3	"Under Pastel Skies"	June 8, 1993
355	4	"Golden Rays of Sunlight"	June 15, 1993
356	5	"The Magic of Fall"	June 22, 1993
357	6	"Glacier Lake"	June 29, 1993
358	7	"The Old Weathered Barn"	July 6, 1993
359	8	"Deep Forest Falls"	July 13, 1993
360	9	"Winter's Grace"	July 20, 1993
361	10	"Splendor of Autumn"	July 27, 1993
362	11	"Tranquil Seas"	August 3, 1993
363	12	"Mountain Serenity"	August 10, 1993
364	13	"Home Before Nightfall"	August 17, 1993

=== Season 29 (1993) ===
No. overall	No. in season	Title	Original release date
365	1	"Island in the Wilderness"	August 24, 1993
366	2	"Autumn Oval"	August 31, 1993
367	3	"Seasonal Progression"	September 7, 1993
368	4	"Light at the Summit"	September 14, 1993
369	5	"Countryside Barn"	September 21, 1993
370	6	"Mountain Lake Falls"	September 28, 1993
Special guest: Steve Ross
371	7	"Cypress Creek"	October 5, 1993
372	8	"Trapper's Cabin"	October 12, 1993
373	9	"Storm on the Horizon"	October 19, 1993
374	10	"Pot O' Posies"	October 26, 1993
Special Guest Artist: Annette Kowalski (business partner of Bob Ross)
375	11	"A Perfect Winter Day"	November 2, 1993
376	12	"Aurora's Dance"	November 9, 1993
377	13	"Woodsman's Retreat"	November 16, 1993

=== Season 30 (1993) ===
No. overall	No. in season	Title	Original release date
378	1	"Babbling Brook"	November 23, 1993
379	2	"Woodgrain View"	November 30, 1993
380	3	"Winter's Peace"	December 7, 1993
381	4	"Wilderness Trail"	December 14, 1993
382	5	"A Copper Winter"	December 21, 1993
383	6	"Misty Foothills"	December 28, 1993
384	7	"Through the Window"	January 4, 1994
385	8	"Home in the Valley"	January 11, 1994
386	9	"Mountains of Grace"	January 18, 1994
387	10	"Seaside Harmony"	January 25, 1994
Special guest: Steve Ross
388	11	"A Cold Spring Day"	February 1, 1994
389	12	"Evening's Glow"	February 8, 1994
390	13	"Blue Ridge Falls"	February 15, 1994

=== Season 31 (1994) ===
The 31st season of The Joy of Painting aired on PBS in 1994. The series concluded before Bob Ross's death on July 4, 1995.

No. overall	No. in season	Title	Original release date
391	1	"Reflections of Calm"	February 22, 1994
392	2	"Before the Snowfall"	March 1, 1994
393	3	"Winding Stream"	March 8, 1994
394	4	"Tranquility Cove"	March 15, 1994
395	5	"Cabin in the Hollow"	March 22, 1994
396	6	"View From Clear Creek"	March 29, 1994
397	7	"Bridge to Autumn"	April 5, 1994
398	8	"Trail's End"	April 12, 1994
399	9	"Evergreen Valley"	April 19, 1994
400	10	"Balmy Beach"	April 26, 1994
401	11	"Lake at the Ridge"	May 3, 1994
Featuring Steve Ross
402	12	"In the Midst of Winter"	May 10, 1994
403	13	"Wilderness Way"	May 17, 1994

=== Season 32 (2024) ===
The Joy of Painting returned to television as "The Joy of Painting with Nicholas Hankins: Bob Ross's Unfinished Season." Nicholas Hankins, a Ross certified instructor, was the on-air host and painter. Hankins previously produced his own painting instructional videos. He released them through Bob Ross's YouTube page.

All episode plans are based on the Daytona State College press release.

No. overall	No. in season	Title	Original release date
404	1	"Misty Mountain Morning"	May 3, 2024
405	2	"Storm’s Arrival"	May 10, 2024
406	3	"Moonlit Serenade"	May 17, 2024
407	4	"Trapper's Retreat"	May 24, 2024
408	5	"September Song"	May 31, 2024
409	6	"Midnight Breaker"	June 7, 2024
410	7	"Woodland Peace"	June 14, 2024
411	8	"Alpine Meadow"	June 21, 2024
412	9	"Galaxy Grandeur"	June 28, 2024
413	10	"Silver Falls"	July 5, 2024
414	11	"Lakeside Sunset"	July 12, 2024
415	12	"Pacific Coastline"	July 19, 2024
416	13	"Independence Day"	July 26, 2024

=== Season 33 (2025) ===
No. overall	No. in season	Title	Original release date
417	1	"Crisp Day in the Valley"	July 4, 2025
418	2	"Nolichucky Summertime"	July 11, 2025
419	3	"Winter Among the Pines"	July 18, 2025
420	4	"New Smyrna Sunrise"	July 25, 2025
421	5	"LeConte Summit"	August 1, 2025
422	6	"Fire and Ice"	August 8, 2025
423	7	"Late Afternoon Hike"	August 15, 2025
424	8	"Timberline Homestead"	August 22, 2025
425	9	"Midday Dunes"	August 29, 2025
426	10	"Appalachian Atmospheres"	September 5, 2025
427	11	"Cascading Stream in the Woods"	September 12, 2025
428	12	"View from Home"	September 19, 2025
429	13	"Smuggler's Moon"	September 26, 2025

=== Season 34 (2026) ===
List retrieved from aptonline.org.

No. overall	No. in season	Title	Original release date
430	1	"Morning Vista"	July 9, 2026
431	2	"Moonbeam Beach"	July 17, 2026
432	3	"Cattail Creek"	July 21, 2026
433	4	"Winter Glow"	July 22, 2026
434	5	"Lupine Valley"	July 29, 2026
435	6	"Windy Palms"	August 5, 2026
436	7	"Shenandoah Redbuds"	TBD
437	8	"A Splendid Sunset"	TBD
438	9	"Buckthorn"	TBD
439	10	"Sunset Mountain"	TBD
440	11	"Red Sky in the Morning"	TBD
441	12	"Riverbend"	TBD
442	13	"Forest Discovery"	TBD
