= Robert Warren (artist) =

American professional artist and art instructor

Robert Warren (born 1949) is an American professional artist and art instructor. A student of William Alexander, he helped further develop and adapt Alexander's wet-on-wet style of painting and teaching.

Robert Warren has produced more than 200 instructional programs in oil painting including The Art of William Alexander & Robert Warren, on PBS, and Robert Warren's Art Loft, on the Nostalgia Network and on other networks worldwide. His subject matter encompasses several areas of interest such as landscapes, still life, and portraiture. Robert teaches people all over the United States to paint by holding art workshops.

Robert Warren opened his current studio, Robert Warren's Art Loft, in Canal Winchester, Ohio, in 1986. His studio, The Art Loft is located at 75 North High Street in Canal Winchester, Ohio. This restored 1874 Grange Hall houses and displays many of Robert Warren's original paintings, as well as paintings and sculptures by other well-known artists. From landscapes to classic portraits, Robert teaches seminars and classes worldwide from beginning through advanced levels.
