= Jasper Schade van Westrum =

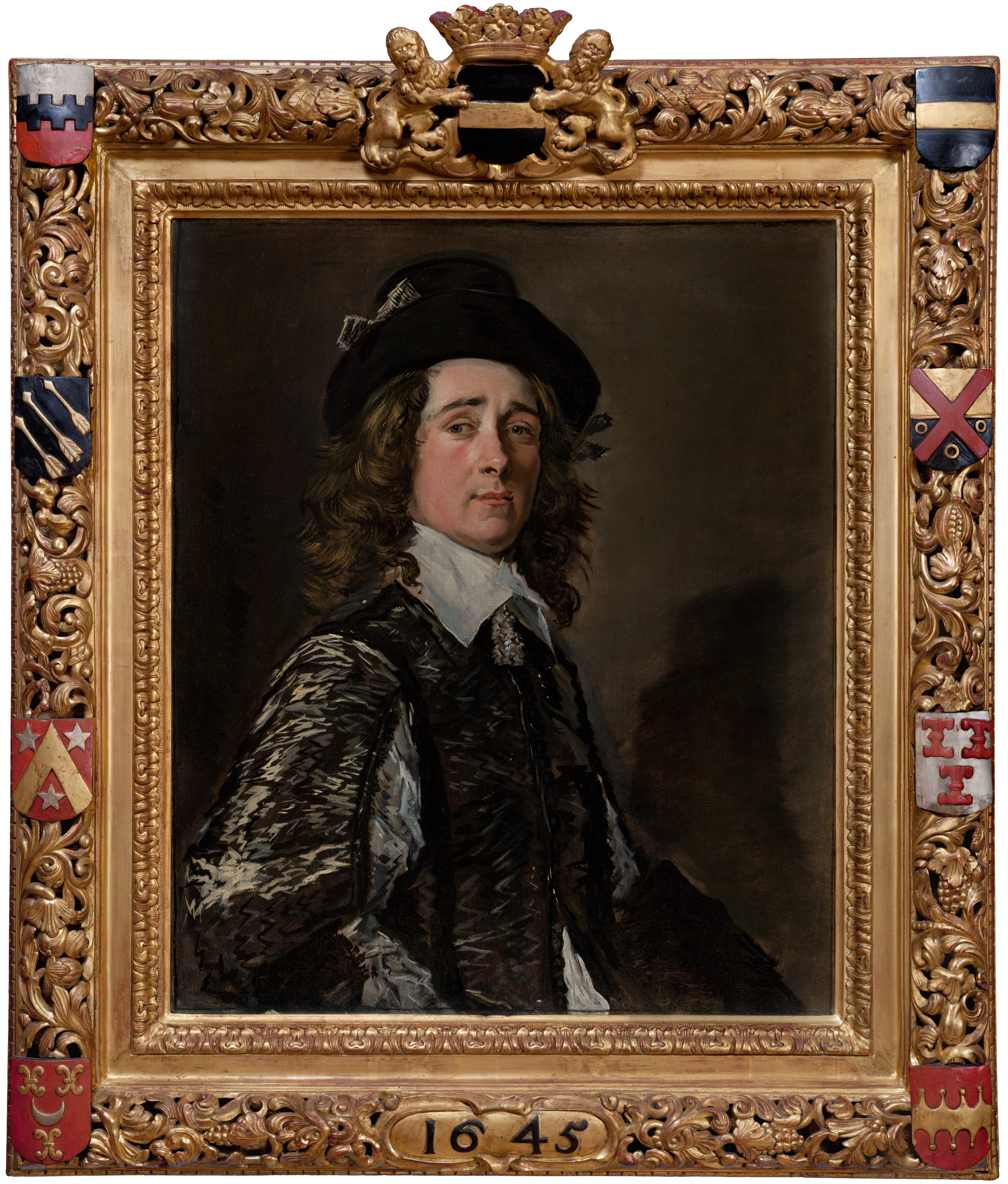
- Jasper Schade van Westrum, 1645 Oil on canvas, 80 cm × 67.5 cm
- Artist: Frans Hals
- Year: 1645
- Catalogue: Seymour Slive, Catalog 1974: #168
- Medium: Oil on canvas
- Dimensions: 80 cm × 67.5 cm (31 in × 26.6 in)
- Location: National Gallery in Prague, Prague

Jasper Schade (1623–1692), was a Dutch representative to the States-General who is best known today for his portrait by Frans Hals.

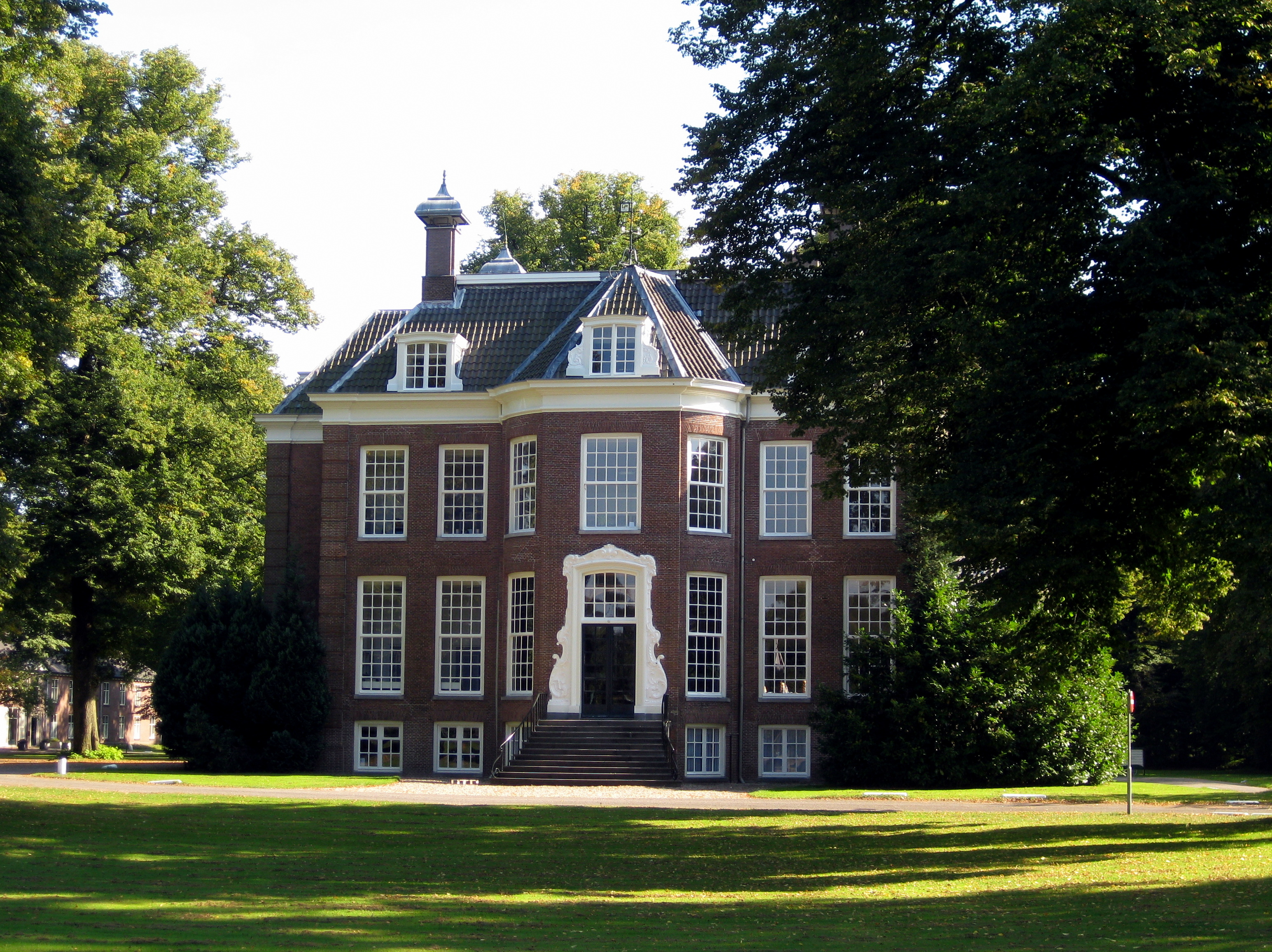
Zandbergen in Huis ter Heide, Utrecht

He was also known for his buitenplaats Zandbergen on the Amersfoortseweg that was built by Jacob van Campen. His portrait by Hals hung there for centuries, though it was in the possession of National Gallery in Prague by 1890. This portrait is admirable for the loose brushwork used to depict the gold brocade of his jacket. Research has revealed that it was painted alla prima or wet-in-wet. Measuring only 31.5 × 26.6 inches, this portrait could have easily been completed while Schade was on a day trip to Haarlem, taking it with him, still wet. The painting was documented by Cornelis Hofstede de Groot in 1910 who wrote:

"221. JASPER SCHADE VAN WESTRUM (died October 25, 1692), President of the Court at Utrecht. B. 124; M. 68. Half-length; life size. A youth, turned three-quarters right, looks at the spectator. On his long curls, he wears a black felt hat with two bows. He wears a shot-silk costume with a plain close-fitting linen collar. The sleeves are slashed with white, and the coat opens to show the white shirt. The prevailing tone is olive green. At the top of the picture are the arms of Schade van Westrum; sable, a fess or, with two realistic lions as supporters. [Compare 168.] Dated 1645; canvas, 29 1/2 inches by 26 inches. See Moes, Iconographia Batava, No. 6803, i. Engraved by C. Waltner. Sale. John W. Wilson of Brussels, Paris, March 14, 1881. [See 1873 catalogue, p. 83.] In the Rudolphinum, Prague; given by Prince Liechtenstein."

Schade planned the road his home was built on and planted the trees there that later became a large forest. He later went on to serve as deacon of the chapter of Oud-Munster at Utrecht, and representative to the States-General of the Netherlands from Utrecht. His wedding portrait was painted nine years later in 1654, along with that of his wife Cornelia Strick van Linschoten, by Cornelis Jonson van Ceulen, a Dutch painter who had himself just returned from London.

== Wedding pendants by Cornelis Janssens van Ceulen ==
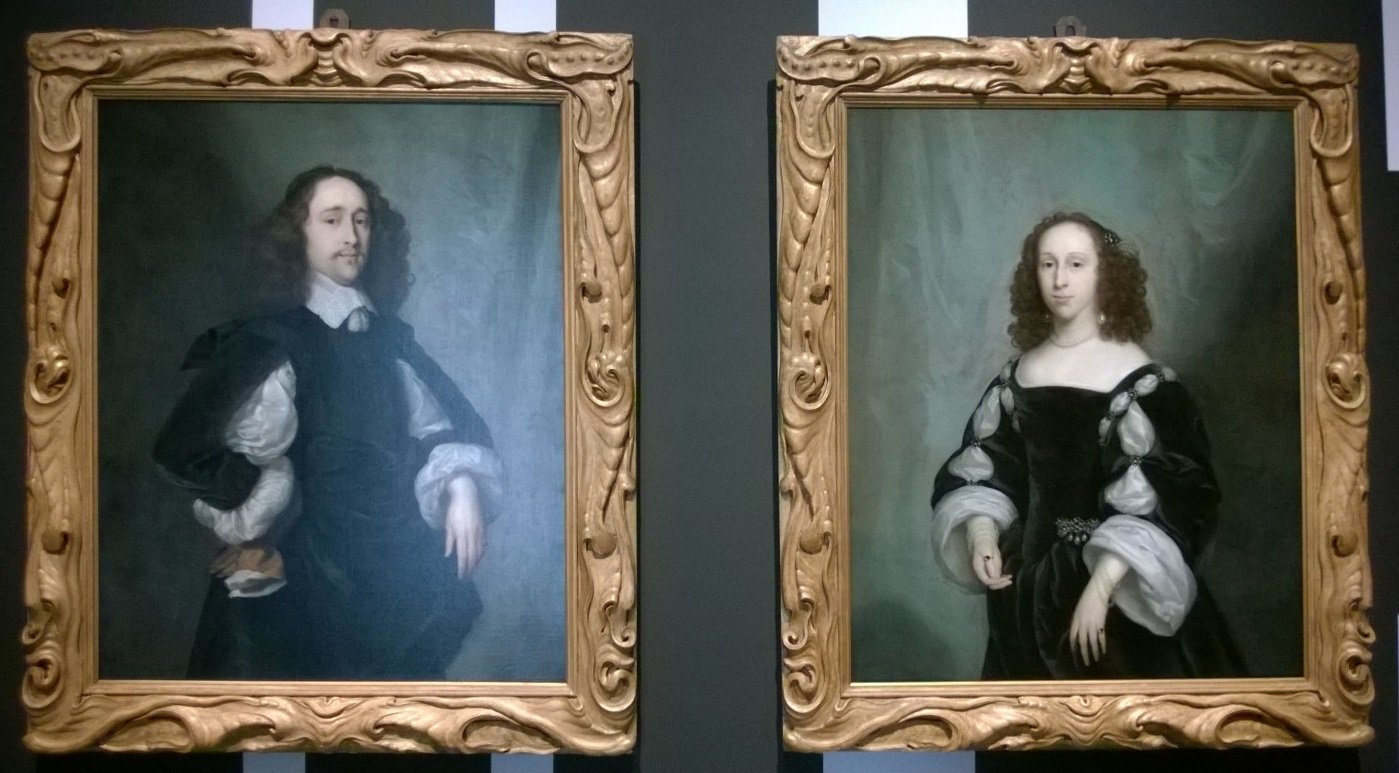
Pendants with his wife Cornelia Strick van Linschoten (1628-1703), 1654, by Janssens van Ceulen
