= The Joy of Painting =

Instructional television show hosted by painter Bob Ross

- Created by: Bob Ross
- Starring: Bob Ross; Nicholas Hankins
- Opening theme: Interlude by Larry Owens
- Country of origin: United States
- Original language: English
- No. of seasons: 33
- No. of episodes: 429 (list of episodes)

Production
- Running time: 30 minutes
- Production companies: WNVC (1983) (season 1); WIPB (1983–1994) (seasons 2–31); WDSC-TV (season 32–present)

Original release
- Network: PBS
- Release: January 11, 1983 – May 17, 1994
- Release: May 3, 2024 – present

Related
- The Magic of Oil Painting

The Joy of Painting is an American half-hour instructional television show. Created and hosted by painter Bob Ross, it ran from January 11, 1983, to May 17, 1994. In most episodes, Ross taught techniques for landscape oil painting, completing a painting in each session. Occasionally, episodes featured a guest artist who would demonstrate a different painting technique. The program followed the same format as its predecessor from 1974 to 1982, The Magic of Oil Painting, which had been hosted by Ross's mentor Bill Alexander. In 2024, the series was revived with Nicholas Hankins as host, initially using unused paintings Ross had completed before his death.

== Production ==
The show was aired and produced by non-commercial, public television stations. The first season aired in early 1983 and was produced by WNVC in Falls Church, Virginia. Starting in the second season in late 1983, the show was produced by WIPB in Muncie, Indiana, until its end in 1994, and later by Blue Ridge Public Television in Roanoke, Virginia. The show is currently being distributed by American Public Television. Reruns began syndication at PBS stations in the United States in 1992, under the moniker The Best of The Joy of Painting, featuring a collection of Bob Ross's favorite paintings from past seasons. By the early 1990s, nearly 300 episodes of The Joy of Painting were on the air in the United States on PBS and in Canada on CBC Television. The Joy of Painting would later begin broadcasting in different places around the world, such as Mexico, Costa Rica, Colombia, the United Kingdom, Latin America, Greece, the Netherlands, Germany, Switzerland, Austria, Turkey, Iran, South Korea, Australia, and Japan.

In 2022, Joan Kowalski, an executive at Ross' holding company and daughter of business partners Walt and Annette Kowalski, and WDSC-TV commissioned a pilot based on a painting that was unfinished for a 32nd season that was planned when Ross died before production began. Bob Ross Art Workshop and Gallery instructor Nicholas Hankins hosted the pilot, which was so well-received that a full 13-episode run was filmed in March and June 2023. Originally intended to be filmed as The Best of the Joy of Painting with Bob Ross, WDSC and Bob Ross, Inc. used the seven paintings by Ross from the unfinished season and six new paintings by Hankins to finish the season. The new series is distributed with PBS and American Public Television under the title The Joy of Painting with Nicholas Hankins: Bob Ross's Unfinished Season. In December 2024, Hankins posted on Instagram during the wrap party that a 33rd season has been commissioned by WDSC, and began to be broadcast in the summer of 2025.

== Funding ==
- Alexander Art Company (1984–1985)
- All-Tech Art (1983–1984)
- The Artist's Magazine (1989–1994)
- Langnickel (1988–1991)
- Martin F. Weber Company (1985–1994)
- Michael's Stores (1986)

== Format ==
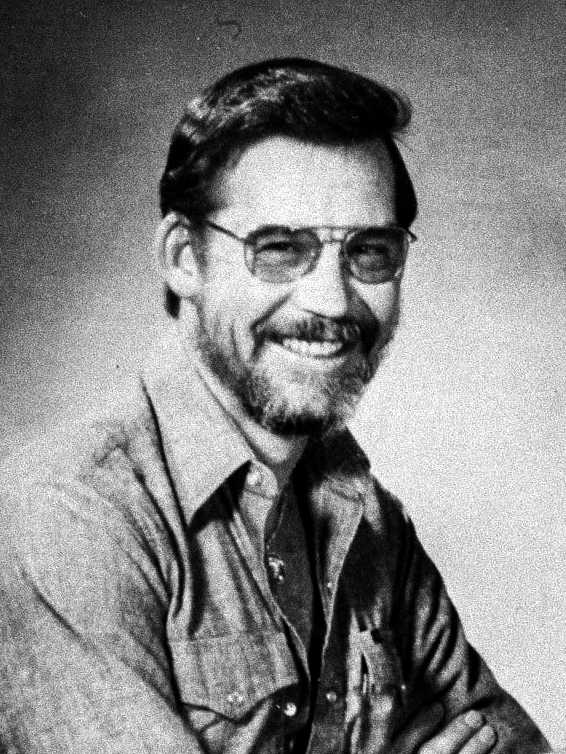
Ross c. 1982

At the beginning of each episode, the canvas was blank. Most episodes would begin with either a blank white canvas, or less often, a canvas pre-painted with black gesso; this blank canvas would be coated with a thin coat of liquid white paint (for a white canvas; Ross used Bill Alexander's proprietary Magic White in earlier seasons before going to a generic name later on) or a dark color (for black). If a painting was expected to take longer than the half-hour time slot, the earliest steps would be prepared before the episode started as Ross gave a cursory explanation of his canvas preparation. For shorter paintings, Ross would fill time by showing off animals such as his pet squirrel Peapod or videos of him at a nature preserve, or footage of Ross at a public event. Within the first few minutes of each show, the blank canvas has turned into a landscape, seascape, or winter scenery, using the wet-on-wet technique, in which the painter adds still-wet paint, rather than waiting for each layer of paint to dry. Combining this method with the use of two-inch and other types of brushes, as well as painting knives, allowed him to paint trees, water, clouds, mountains, seascapes and winter scenery in a matter of seconds. The paintings featured colors that Ross had on the show, such as titanium white, phthalo green, phthalo blue, Prussian blue, midnight black, dark sienna, van dyke brown, burnt umber (discontinued in later seasons), alizarin crimson, sap green, cadmium yellow, yellow ochre, Indian yellow and bright red (permanent red in earlier seasons).

Each painting started with criss-cross strokes, that appeared to be nothing more than the smudges of color. As more criss-cross were added, the blotches transformed into intricate paintings. While painting, he instructed viewers regarding the techniques that he was using, he told stories about the "happy little clouds", and "happy little trees", that he was creating. He would often attach human emotions to the objects he was painting; after painting a tree trunk, for example, Ross would usually add another nearby "because it needs a friend". He would occasionally present home video footage of himself with a baby deer, a raccoon and another small animal. Each program was shot in real time with two cameras: a medium shot of Ross and his canvas, and a close-up shot of the canvas or palette. At the end of each episode, Ross was known for saying something akin to, "...so, from all of us here, I'd like to wish you happy painting, and God bless, my friend...". Then, the show's theme song ("Interlude", a stock selection from Network Music, from season 2 onward) played, as the credits rolled over a shot of the finished and successful painting.

Ross created three versions of each painting. The first, done prior to taping, sat on an easel off-camera and was used as a template to create a second, which the viewers actually watched him paint. After taping, he painted a more detailed third one for inclusion in his instructional books. All three were then donated to various PBS stations, the Smithsonian Institution, or kept by Bob Ross, Inc.

The show featured many guest appearances from other painters, who painted in Ross's stead, such as Dana Jester, Ross's son Steve, John Thamm, Audrey Golden, Joyce Ortner, Ben Stahl, Dorothy Dent, his business partner Annette Kowalski (who specialized in floral painting), Ferne Sirois and Diane Andre.

== Episodes ==
Season	Episodes	Originally aired	
Season	Episodes	Season premiere	Season finale
1	13	January 11, 1983	March 29, 1983
2	13	August 31, 1983	November 23, 1983
3	13	January 4, 1984	March 29, 1984
4	13	September 5, 1984	November 28, 1984
5	13	January 2, 1985	March 27, 1985
6	13	May 1, 1985	July 23, 1985
7	13	October 2, 1985	December 27, 1985
8	13	January 2, 1986	March 27, 1986
9	13	April 30, 1986	July 23, 1986
10	13	September 3, 1986	November 26, 1986
11	13	December 31, 1986	March 25, 1987
12	13	April 29, 1987	July 22, 1987
13	13	September 2, 1987	November 25, 1987
14	13	December 30, 1987	March 23, 1988
15	13	April 27, 1988	July 20, 1988
16	13	August 17, 1988	November 9, 1988
17	13	January 4, 1989	March 29, 1989
18	13	July 5, 1989	September 27, 1989
19	13	January 3, 1990	March 28, 1990
20	13	April 4, 1990	June 27, 1990
21	13	September 5, 1990	November 28, 1990
22	13	January 1, 1991	March 26, 1991
23	13	September 3, 1991	November 26, 1991
24	13	January 7, 1992	March 31, 1992
25	13	August 25, 1992	November 17, 1992
26	13	December 1, 1992	February 23, 1993
27	13	March 2, 1993	May 20, 1993
28	13	May 25, 1993	August 17, 1993
29	13	August 24, 1993	November 16, 1993
30	13	November 23, 1993	February 15, 1994
31	13	February 22, 1994	May 17, 1994
32	13	May 3, 2024	July 26, 2024
33	13	July 4, 2025	September 26, 2025
34	13	July 9, 2026	TBD

== Legacy ==
In 1994, Ross appeared on Bill Nye the Science Guy, where he did a self-parody segment entitled "The Artistic Eye with Bob Ross”.

As part of its launch of Twitch Creative, Twitch streamed every episode over a nine-day period starting on October 29, 2015 – what would have been Ross's 73rd birthday. Twitch reported 5.6 million viewers, and due to its popularity, created a weekly rebroadcast of all 31 seasons of The Joy of Painting to air on Twitch each Monday from November 2015 onward, and will have a marathon of episodes each October 29. A portion of the advertising revenue has been promised to charities, including St. Jude Children's Research Hospital. This event was also repeated on October 29, 2016, for his 74th birthday.

In 2015, all 403 episodes of The Joy of Painting were added to the official Bob Ross YouTube channel, although all episodes featuring his son Steve have since been removed. In June 2016, Netflix repackaged several 1991–92 episodes of The Joy of Painting under the moniker Beauty Is Everywhere. A second package, titled Chill with Bob Ross, was added in December. In 2020, Tubi added 30 seasons of The Joy of Painting, totaling nearly 400 episodes, to its platform for free. A 24-hour FAST channel called The Bob Ross Channel, featuring reruns of The Joy of Painting, is available on multiple streaming platforms including The Roku Channel, DirecTV Stream, and Peacock.

In November 2017, the first teaser trailer for the 2018 film Deadpool 2 was released, featuring a parody of The Joy of Painting with Ryan Reynolds as Deadpool.

The Joy of Painting has been licensed for merchandise, including a Chia Pet and a breakfast cereal made by the makers of Flutie Flakes.

A comedy television series in Iran called Khande Bazaar had in each episode an item called The Humiliation of Painting, a parody of The Joy of Painting in which Mohammad Reza Khosravi imitated Bob Ross.

Gary Spetze's Painting Wild Places, which debuted in 2004, follows a similar format to The Joy of Painting.

The 2000–2005 Canadian comedy series Buzz featured a parody sketch named The Cable Access Painter, where Daryn Jones played a parody of Bob Ross making childishly adult paintings.

The program returned to television on BBC Four as part of Culture Quarantine Programming with its first broadcast on April 20, 2020.

The MeTV classic cartoon anthology program Toon In With Me parodied The Joy of Painting with Mel Attonin, a Bob Ross parody played by Kevin Fleming whose speech and paintings are ominous and unsettling.

In 2022, Goodfood Market released a parody Bob Ross TV commercial titled "Joy of Cooking".

Ross's painting from the first episode of The Joy of Painting, "A Walk in the Woods", was listed for sale in 2023 priced at $9.85 million.

In 2025, following renewed threats to public broadcasting, Bonhams announced plans to auction 30 original Bob Ross paintings, with the proceeds going towards funding of public television stations. The first auction of three paintings took place in Los Angeles on November 11.
