= Gary Spetze's Painting Wild Places =

- Genre: Arts; Educational
- Narrated by: Gary Spetze
- Country of origin: United States

Original release
- Network: PBS
- Release: 2004 – present

Gary Spetze's Painting Wild Places is a watercolor painting television series hosted by Gary Spetze which debuted in 2004. The series, similar in format to The Joy of Painting, is distributed by American Public Television to select PBS-member stations.
