= Bill Alexander (painter) =

German painter and television host (1915-1997)

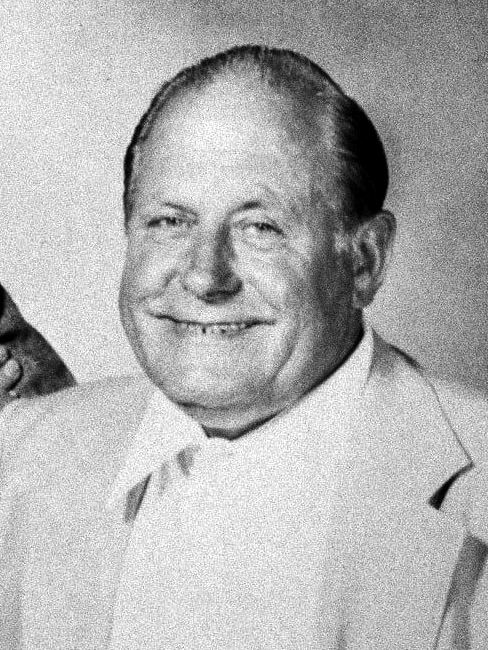
- Alexander, c. 1982
- Born: Wilhelm Alexander; 2 April 1915; Berlin, German Empire
- Died: 24 January 1997 (aged 81); Port Alberni, British Columbia, Canada
- Known for: Hosting The Magic of Oil Painting; Teaching television painter Bob Ross

William Alexander (born Wilhelm Alexander; 2 April 1915 – 24 January 1997) was a German painter, art instructor, and television host. He was the creator and host of The Magic of Oil Painting (1974–1982) television series that ran on PBS in the United States. He co-wrote The Art of Bill Alexander and … (1987–1995), a series of books on wet-on-wet oil painting, based on different PBS series of the same form. He also taught the television painter Bob Ross his signature "quick" wet-on-wet technique.

== Life ==
Wilhelm Alexander was born in Berlin to a family of East Prussian origin. His family had fled to Berlin during World War I, and returned to their home in Rautenberg (now Uzlovoye and part of Russia's Kaliningrad Oblast) after the war.

Apprenticed as a carriage maker, Alexander was drafted into the Wehrmacht during World War II. Captured by Allied troops, he painted portraits of Allied officers' wives and he soon made his way to the United States.

After World War II, Alexander was a refugee and became a professional painter. He pioneered the modern "quick" version of the 15th century wet-on-wet technique, and moved to North America.

Later, known as Bill Alexander, he began hosting television shows focused on painting education and his methods. He is best known for the television program The Magic of Oil Painting which ran on PBS in the US from 1974 to 1982. He teamed with other artists on several different PBS series of the format The Art of Bill Alexander and … that ran from 1984 to 1992. These artists started with Lowell Speers and included Robert Warren, Sharon Perkins and Diane André. Alexander and the second featured artist would alternate episodes, with both painters using the wet-on-wet method. This series was turned into a series of books "as seen on television".

Alexander moved to Sproat Lake in British Columbia, Canada, in the early 1990s. He retired due to a heart attack and a stroke, and died on 24 January 1997.

== Relations with Bob Ross ==
TV host and prolific painter Bob Ross studied under Alexander, from whom he learned his wet-on-wet technique, a method of painting rapidly using progressively thinner layers of oil paint. Ross mentioned in the very first episode of The Joy of Painting that he had learned the technique from Bill Alexander, calling it "the most fantastic way to paint that you've ever seen". Ross also dedicated the first episode of the second season to Alexander, explaining that "I feel as though he gave me a precious gift, and I'd like to share that gift with you [the viewer]".

As Ross's popularity grew, his relationship with Alexander became increasingly strained. In a 1991 interview with The New York Times, Alexander said of Ross: "He betrayed me. I invented 'wet on wet'. I trained him, and he is copying me – what bothers me is not just that he betrayed me, but that he thinks he can do it better."

Art historians have pointed out that the "wet-on-wet" (or alla prima) technique actually originated in Flanders during the 15th century, and was used by Frans Hals, Diego Velázquez, Caravaggio, Paul Cézanne, John Singer Sargent, and Claude Monet, among many others. However, Alexander invented the step of priming the canvas with a coat of thin liquid white paint (which Alexander branded as "Magic White") and designed the style of palette knife employed, which is larger, firmer, and has one straight edge. Both inventions are fundamental for his wet-on-wet technique.

== Bibliography ==
- Alexander, W. (1983). The Bill Alexander Story: An Autobiography. Kendall Hunt. ISBN 0840329903.
- Alexander, W. (1989). Secrets to the Magic of Oil Painting. Walter Foster.
- Alexander, W. (1990). The Magic of Oil Painting. Walter Foster. ISBN 0929261372.
- Alexander, William (1997). Landscapes: Learn to Paint Step by Step. Walter Foster. ISBN 0929261607.
- Mǔller, Jorg-Michael (2024). The Forgotten Artist William "Bill" Alexander. ISBN 3758327202.

== See also ==
- List of German painters
