= Bob Ross =

American painter and TV host (1942–1995)

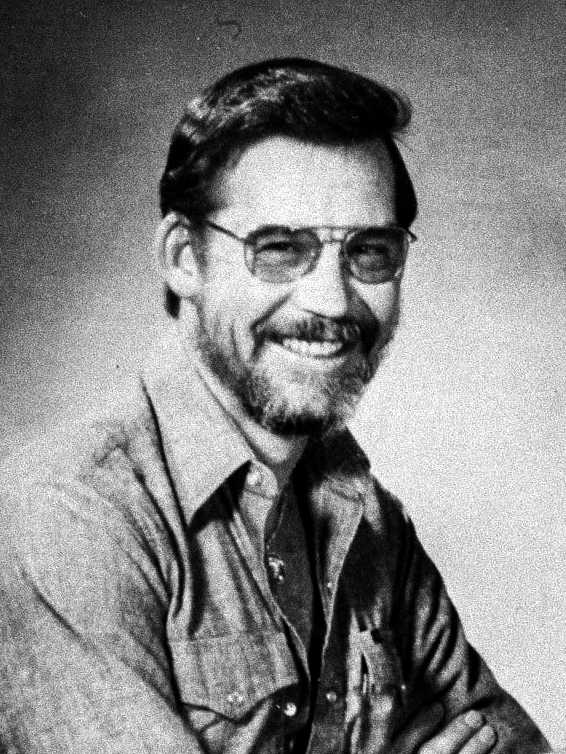
- Publicity photo of Ross, c. 1982
- Born: Robert Norman Ross; October 29, 1942; Daytona Beach, Florida, U.S.
- Died: July 4, 1995 (aged 52); Orlando, Florida, U.S.
- Resting place: Woodlawn Memorial Park
- Occupations: Painter; art instructor; television host
- Years active: 1981–1995
- Spouses: Vivian Ridge (m. 1965; div. 1977); Jane Ross (m. 1977; died 1992); Lynda Brown (m. 1995)
- Children: 2
- Military career
- Branch: United States Air Force
- Service years: 1961–1981
- Rank: Master sergeant
- Website: bobross.com

Robert Norman Ross (October 29, 1942 – July 4, 1995) was an American painter and art instructor who created and hosted The Joy of Painting, an instructional television program that aired from 1983 to 1994 on PBS in the United States and CBC in Canada.

Born in Daytona Beach, Florida, Ross joined the United States Air Force in 1961, rising to the rank of master sergeant. During his time in the military, he developed a passion for oil painting. He studied the art from Bill Alexander's show The Magic of Oil Painting, and eventually his income from painting outgrew his military salary. Retiring from the Air Force in 1981, he was discovered by Annette Kowalski, who had attended one of his sessions while he was working as a tutor. She and her husband helped Ross pool together money to set up a new company: Bob Ross Inc.

In 1982, a station aired his art class as a pilot, and several PBS stations signed up for The Joy of Painting soon after. One such station, WIPB, employed him to host the show in Muncie, Indiana beginning in 1983. The show features him instructing viewers on how to create landscape art using the quick, wet-on-wet oil painting technique with a limited palette. It ran until 1994, and Ross died a year later at the age of 52.

His legacy continues as a prominent figure in popular culture, with reruns of The Joy of Painting still being broadcast. Although he intended to pass on his whole oeuvre to family members, the Kowalskis (as Bob Ross Inc.) successfully contested this in court. Bob Ross Inc. later made a deal with his half-brother Jimmie Cox to become the legal proprietors of his name and likeness.

== Early life ==
Ross was born on October 29, 1942, in Daytona Beach, Florida. His father, Jack, was a carpenter, and his mother, Ollie, was a waitress. They raised him in Orlando. As an adolescent, Ross cared for injured animals, including armadillos, snakes, alligators and squirrels, one of which was later featured in several episodes of his television show. He had a half-brother Jim, whom he mentioned in passing on his show. Ross dropped out of high school in the 9th grade. While working as a carpenter with his father, he lost part of his left index finger, which did not affect his ability to later hold a palette while painting.

=== Military career ===
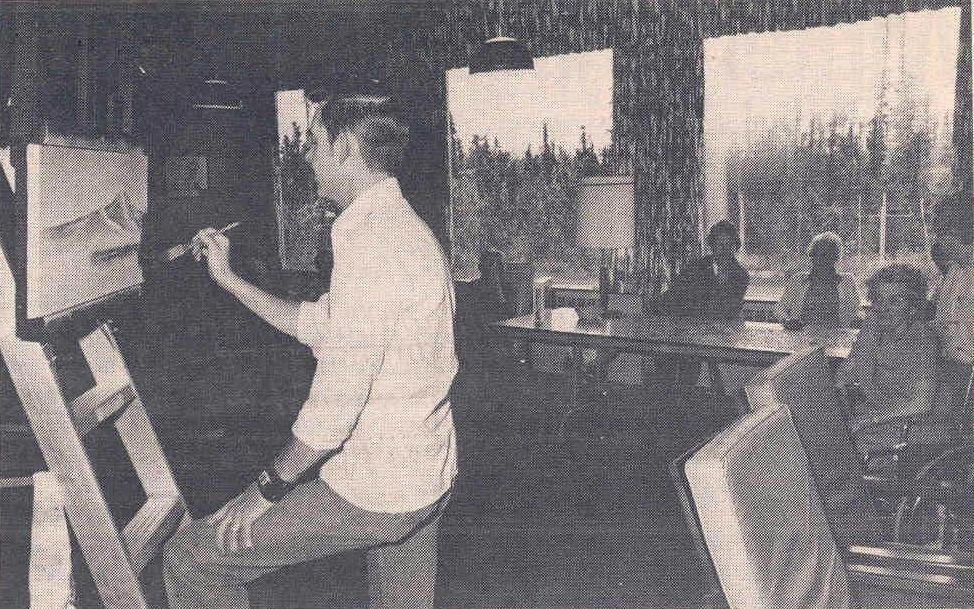
Ross during his Air Force years, giving a painting demonstration in Fairbanks, Alaska, c. late 1970s

In 1961, 18-year-old Ross enlisted in the United States Air Force and was put into service as a medical records technician. He rose to the rank of master sergeant and served as the first sergeant of the clinic at Eielson Air Force Base in Alaska, where he first saw the snow and mountains that later appear as recurring themes in his paintings. He developed his quick painting technique during brief daily work breaks. Having held military positions that required him to act tough and mean, "the guy who makes you scrub the latrine, the guy who makes you make your bed, the guy who screams at you for being late to work," Ross decided he would not raise his voice when he left the military.

== Career as a painter ==
During his 20-year Air Force career, Ross developed an interest in painting after attending an art class at the Anchorage U.S.O. club. He found himself frequently at odds with many of his painting instructors, who were more interested in abstract painting. Ross said, "They'd tell you what makes a tree, but they wouldn't tell you how to paint a tree."

Ross was working as a part-time bartender when he discovered a TV show called The Magic of Oil Painting, hosted by German painter Bill Alexander. Alexander used a 16th-century painting style called alla prima (Italian for 'first attempt'), widely known as "wet-on-wet", that allowed him to create a painting within thirty minutes. Ross studied and mastered the technique, began painting and then successfully selling Alaskan landscapes that he painted on novelty gold-mining pans. Eventually, Ross's income from sales surpassed his military salary. He retired from the Air Force in 1981 as a master sergeant.

He returned to Florida, studied painting with Alexander, joined his "Alexander Magic Art Supplies Company" and became a traveling salesman and tutor. Annette Kowalski, who had attended one of his sessions in Clearwater, Florida, convinced Ross he could succeed on his own. Ross, his wife, Kowalski and Walt, her husband, pooled their savings to create his company. The business struggled at first; his trademark permed hairstyle came about as a cost-cutting measure when his regular crew cut haircuts were becoming too expensive. Ross later confessed that he disliked the hairstyle, but did not feel he could change it because it was depicted in the company logo.

In 1982, a station in Falls Church, Virginia, aired a taping of his art class as a pilot, and 60 PBS stations signed up for the show in the first year. In 1983, PBS station WIPB lured him to Muncie, Indiana, with the promise of creative freedom, and he found a kinship with the staff. He moved home to Florida in 1989 but continued to travel to Muncie every three months to tape the show. Ross said he did the show for free and made his income from how-to books, videotapes and art supplies.

The show ran from January 11, 1983, to May 17, 1994, but reruns still continue to appear in many broadcast areas and countries, including the non-commercial digital subchannel network Create and the streaming service Hulu. In the United Kingdom, the BBC re-ran episodes during the COVID-19 pandemic while most viewers were in lockdown at home.

During each half-hour segment, Ross instructed viewers in the quick, wet-on-wet oil painting technique, painting a scene without sketching it first, but creating the image directly from his imagination, in real time. He explained his limited paint palette, deconstructing the process into simple steps.

Artist and art critic Mira Schor compared Ross to Fred Rogers, host of Mister Rogers' Neighborhood, noting that Ross's soft voice and the slow pace of his speech were similar.

With help from the Kowalskis, Ross used his television show to promote a line of art supplies and class recordings, building what would become a $15-million business—Bob Ross Inc.—which would ultimately expand to include classes taught by other artists trained in his methods. Following Ross's death, ownership of the company was passed to the Kowalskis.

Ross also filmed wildlife, squirrels in particular, usually in his garden, and he would often take in injured or abandoned squirrels and other animals.

Ross painted an estimated 30,000 paintings during his lifetime. Despite the unusually high supply of original paintings, Bob Ross original paintings are scarce on the art market, with sale prices of the paintings averaging in the thousands of dollars and frequently topping $10,000.

Bob Ross Inc. continues to own many of the works he painted for The Joy of Painting, as Ross himself was opposed to having his work turned into financial instruments. Previously, "A Walk in the Woods", Ross's first television painting, was sold in a pledge drive offering shortly after the first season aired; it is, as of September 2023, in the hands of Ryan Nelson, a Minnesota-based art dealer who acquired it from its original buyer and has been the primary dealer for the few Ross paintings that have reached the open art market. Nelson has placed an asking price of $9,850,000 for the sale of the painting and has indicated he has other plans for the painting if it does not sell for that price. In November 2025, Bonhams in Los Angeles auctioned three of Ross' paintings, pledging the profits to public television stations that have been impacted by federal funding cuts. The auction brought in $662,000.

In contrast to more traditionally famous artists, Ross's work, described by an art appraisal service as a cross between "fine art" and "entertainment memorabilia"—is most highly sought after by common fans of The Joy of Painting, as opposed to wealthy collectors. The artwork circulating among collectors is largely from Ross's work from before he launched the television show.

=== Technique ===
Ross used a wet-on-wet oil painting technique of painting over a thin base layer of wet paint. The painting could progress without first drying. The technique used a limited selection of tools and colors that did not require a large investment in expensive equipment. Ross frequently recommended odorless paint thinner (odorless mineral spirits) for brush cleaning.

Combining the wet-painting method with the use of large one- and two-inch brushes, as well as painting knives, allowed the painter to quickly complete a landscape scene.

Ross painted three versions of almost every painting featured on his show. The first was painted prior to taping and sat on an easel off-camera during filming, where Ross used it as a reference to create the second copy, which viewers actually watched him paint. After filming the episode, he painted a more detailed version for inclusion in his instructional books. The versions were each marked on the side or back of the canvas: "Kowalski" for the initial version, "tv" for the version painted during the TV show and "book" for the book version.

=== Influences ===
Ross dedicated the first episode of the second season of The Joy of Painting to Bill Alexander, explaining that "years ago, Bill taught me this fantastic [wet-on-wet] technique, and I feel as though he gave me a precious gift, and I'd like to share that gift with you." As Ross's popularity grew, his relationship with Alexander became increasingly strained. "He betrayed me," Alexander told The New York Times in 1991. "I invented 'wet on wet', I trained him, and ... he thinks he can do it better."

Art historians have pointed out that the "wet-on-wet" (or alla prima) technique actually originated in Flanders during the 15th century and was used by Frans Hals, Diego Velázquez, Caravaggio, Paul Cézanne, John Everett Millais, John Singer Sargent and Claude Monet, among many others.

=== Style ===
Ross was well known for phrases he tended to repeat while painting, such as "let's add some happy little trees".

In most episodes, Ross would note that he enjoyed cleaning his paint brush. He was fond of drying off a brush dipped in odorless thinner by striking it against the can of thinner, then striking it against a box (on early seasons of the show) and a trash can (on later seasons). Occasionally, he would strike the brush hard on the trash can, saying he "hit the bucket" and then on the easel. He would smile and often laugh aloud as he said to "beat the Devil out of it". He also used a lightly sanded palette to avoid reflections from the studio lighting.

In every show, Ross wore jeans and a plain light-colored shirt, which he believed would be a timeless look, and spoke as if addressing one viewer.

When asked about his relaxed and calm approach, he said, "I got a letter from somebody here a while back, and they said, 'Bob, everything in your world seems to be happy.' That's for sure. That's why I paint. It's because I can create the kind of world that I want, and I can make this world as happy as I want it. Shoot, if you want bad stuff, watch the news."

The landscapes he painted, typically mountains, lakes, snow and log cabin scenes, were inspired by his years in Alaska, where he was stationed for the majority of his Air Force career. He repeatedly said everyone has inherent artistic talent and could become an accomplished artist given time, practice and encouragement. Ross would say, "we don't make mistakes; we just have happy accidents."

In 2014, the blog FiveThirtyEight analysed 381 episodes in which Ross painted live, concluding that 91% of Ross's paintings contained at least one tree, 44% included clouds, 39% included mountains and 34% included mountain lakes. By his own estimation, Ross completed more than thirty thousand paintings. His work rarely contained human subjects or signs of human life. On rare occasions, he would incorporate a cabin, sometimes with a chimney but without smoke, and possibly unoccupied. Far more frequently, he would refer to animals that may inhabit the scenes he was painting, such as the cow in a barn or birds that may live in the trees, and encouraged viewers to devise their own stories in their head about the scenes he created.

== Other media appearances ==
Ross was fond of country music and in 1987 was invited on stage by Hank Snow at the Grand Ole Opry in Nashville, Tennessee. The audience gave him a huge ovation; he was slightly nervous at first, but felt better after cracking a joke to the crowd. Snow was later given a private painting lesson by Ross.

Ross visited New York City to promote his hardcover book, The Best of the Joy of Painting with Bob Ross, and painting techniques to a studio audience several times. On one visit in 1989, he appeared on The Joan Rivers Show. He returned in 1992 for a live show with hosts Regis Philbin and Kathie Lee Gifford. In 1994, Ross appeared on the Phil Donahue Show and took five audience members on-stage to do a painting. Donahue also did a painting during that episode.

In the early 1990s, Ross did several MTV promotional spots that, according to the American City Business Journals, "dovetailed perfectly with Generation X's burgeoning obsession with all things ironic and retro".

In 1995, a visibly ill Ross made his final public television appearance as a guest on the pilot episode of the children's series The Adventures of Elmer and Friends. The series premiered in 1996, one year after Ross's death. The episode included a final message of thanks from Ross to his fans and viewers and a musical tribute.

== Personal life ==
Ross was married three times and had two children: a child he fathered from a relationship he had as a teenager, and a son, Robert Stephen "Steve" Ross with his first wife, Vivian Ridge. Steve, also a talented painter, occasionally appeared on The Joy of Painting and became a Ross-certified instructor. Steve appeared on camera in the last episode of Season 1, in which he read a series of general "how-to" questions sent in by viewers during the season. Bob answered them one at a time, technique by technique, until he had completed an entire painting.

Ross and Ridge's marriage ended in divorce in 1977, allegedly due to Ross's infidelity. Ross and his second wife Jane had no children together. In 1992, Jane died of cancer. In 1995, two months before his death, Ross married for a third time, to Lynda Brown.

Ross was very secretive about his life and had a great preference for privacy. Some of only a few interviews with his close-knit circle of friends and family can be found in the 2011 PBS documentary Bob Ross: The Happy Painter. Bob Ross Inc. is protective of his intellectual property and his privacy to this day.

Ross was not a member of any specific organized religion. He frequently expressed his belief in a creator god and often closed his shows with a wish that "God bless" his viewers.

== Death ==
A cigarette smoker for most of his adult life, Ross had several health problems, and expected to die prematurely. He died at the age of 52 on July 4, 1995, in Orlando, Florida, due to complications from lymphoma, with which he had been diagnosed several years prior. Ross kept his diagnosis a secret from the general public. His lymphoma was not known outside of his circle of family and friends until after his death. At the time of his death he had prepared seven paintings for a potential 32nd season of The Joy of Painting. His remains are interred at Woodlawn Memorial Park in Gotha, Florida, under a plaque marked "Bob Ross; Television Artist".

Under the terms of the incorporation of Bob Ross Inc., the death of any partner in the company would lead to that person's stock being equally divided among the partners. Ross's death, along with that of his second wife, the other partner in the company, left the Kowalskis with sole ownership of the company. The Kowalskis were largely interested in using Ross's name only for painting supplies. They became very aggressive against Ross's family members and associates, allegedly trying to pressure an ailing Ross to sign over rights to his estate before his death.

Instead, Ross wrote the Kowalskis out of his will and testament, leaving his estate and rights to his name and likeness to his son Steve and half-brother Jimmie Cox. The Kowalskis countered that virtually everything Ross had done in his lifetime was a work for hire and thus Ross had no right to bequeath them. The Kowalskis eventually won the lawsuit.

After the Kowalskis retired and their daughter Joan Kowalski took over the company, she became more open to merchandising the Ross brand outside of its core business of painting products, setting in motion the mass marketing of his name from the 2010s onward. Joan also engineered a settlement with Jimmie Cox granting Bob Ross Inc. rights to Ross's name and likeness, in exchange for a guarantee that Steve Ross could resume his art career without threat of lawsuit, something that Steve Ross said had largely stopped him from painting in public after his father's death. Joan Kowalski also commissioned a revival series of The Joy of Painting featuring the paintings Ross had planned to use for season 32, with Nicholas Hankins, a Bob Ross Inc. certified instructor, as host.

== Legacy ==
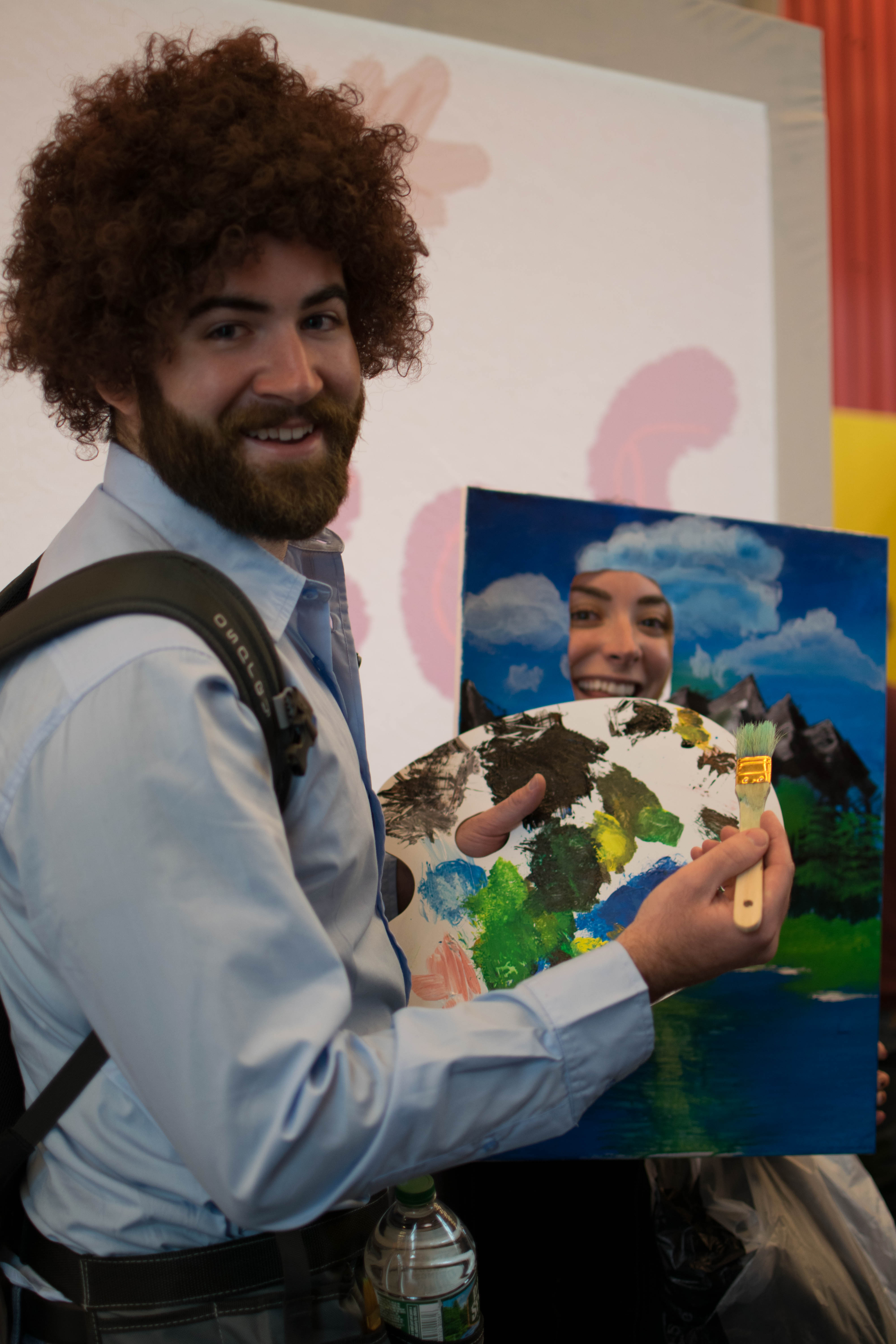
Cosplay of Bob Ross at New York Comic Con 2016

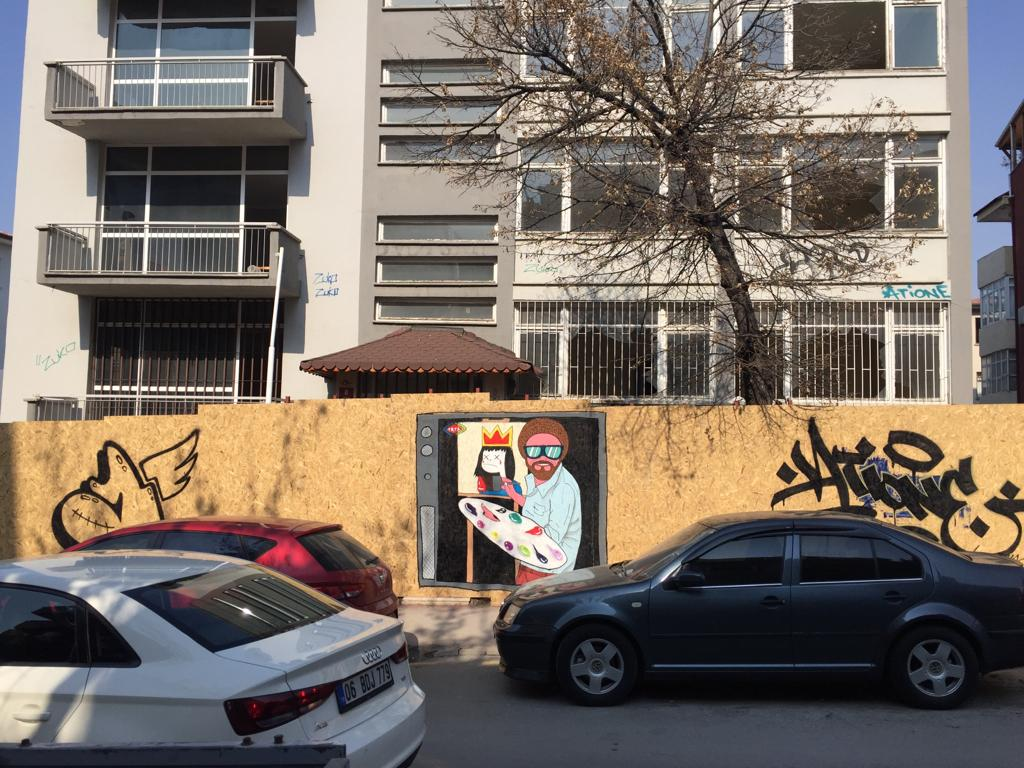
Street art of Bob Ross in Çankaya District, Ankara, Turkey

Ross's likeness has become part of popular culture, with his image spoofed in television programs, films and video games like Family Guy, The Boondocks, Deadpool 2, and Smite.

Google celebrated the 70th anniversary of his birth with a Google Doodle on October 29, 2012. It portrayed Ross painting a depiction of the letter "g" with a landscape in the background. A board game titled Bob Ross: The Art of Chill was released and carried by Target stores, while a Chia Pet model in Bob Ross's likeness was also released. Ross was going to have a video game released on Wii, the Nintendo DS, and PC, with development handled by AGFRAG Entertainment Group, although this never came to fruition.

A newfound interest in Ross occurred in 2015 as part of the launch of Twitch Creative. Twitch hosted a nine-day marathon of The Joy of Painting beginning on October 29 to commemorate what would have been Ross's 73rd birthday. Twitch reported that 5.6 million viewers watched the marathon and, due to its popularity, created a weekly rebroadcast of one season of The Joy of Painting each Monday. A portion of the advertising revenue was promised to charities, including St. Jude Children's Research Hospital.

In June 2016, Ross's series Beauty Is Everywhere was added to the Netflix lineup. The 30-minute episodes are taken from seasons 20, 21, and 22 of the original The Joy of Painting series. The newfound interest surprised the Kowalskis since they were managing Ross's image and The Joy of Painting episodes. They created a YouTube channel for Ross, which gained more than a million subscribers within a year. A 24-hour FAST channel called The Bob Ross Channel, featuring reruns of The Joy of Painting and other Ross-related programming, is available on multiple streaming platforms, including The Roku Channel, DirecTV Stream, and Peacock.

The renewed interest in Ross also led to questions of where his paintings were located, given that more than a thousand works were created for The Joy of Painting. In an investigative report by The New York Times, the Kowalskis affirmed that they still held all of them, though without the proper care generally needed to store art. In 2019, four of Ross's paintings were acquired by the Smithsonian National Museum of American History, which displayed one of the paintings in 2021.

In 2020, the makers of Magic: The Gathering announced a limited release of Bob Ross paintings adapted to card artwork. In August 2021, Netflix released a documentary called Bob Ross: Happy Accidents, Betrayal & Greed, exploring Ross's life, career, legacy, and the controversy surrounding the Kowalskis versus Bob Ross's family.

In 2021, Bob Ross Inc. in conjunction with Running Press Kids, an imprint of Hachette Book Group, released the official Bob Ross children's book biography titled This Is Your World: The Story of Bob Ross. Written by Sophia Gholz and illustrated by Robin Boyden, the book shares the story of Ross's life and how he eventually became one of the most well-known American painters of his time. Owen Wilson plays Carl Nargle, a character based on Bob Ross, in the 2023 film Paint.

=== ASMR ===
The Twitch streams created a new interest in Ross and caused his popularity to grow. His videos subsequently became popular with devotees of autonomous sensory meridian response (ASMR). ASMR refers to a pleasant form of paresthesia, or tingling, often brought about by specific visual or auditory stimuli. Many viewers found that listening to Ross triggered an ASMR response. In the 2021 Netflix documentary, Ross's son Steve said that his father was inspired to speak in that manner because his mentor, Bill Alexander, spoke in a harsh tone on television, and he wanted to do the opposite of that. Since most of the audience of The Joy of Painting was female, he thought, "maybe I'll try to whisper," and that became one of his trademarks.

According to Joan Kowalski, the president of Bob Ross Inc.: "He's sort of the godfather of ASMR ... People were into him for ASMR reasons before there even was an ASMR." Joan Kowalski stated that Ross was aware of viewers who would watch the show for non-instructional purposes during his lifetime and approved of such use of his program, recalling a quip of his about those who would fall asleep to The Joy of Painting: "I love hearing that you've never watched a full episode of me."

== See also ==
- Tony Hart, an English artist best known for his work on children's television
- Nancy Kominsky, an American artist known for her painting series on UK television
