= Wet-on-wet =

Painting technique

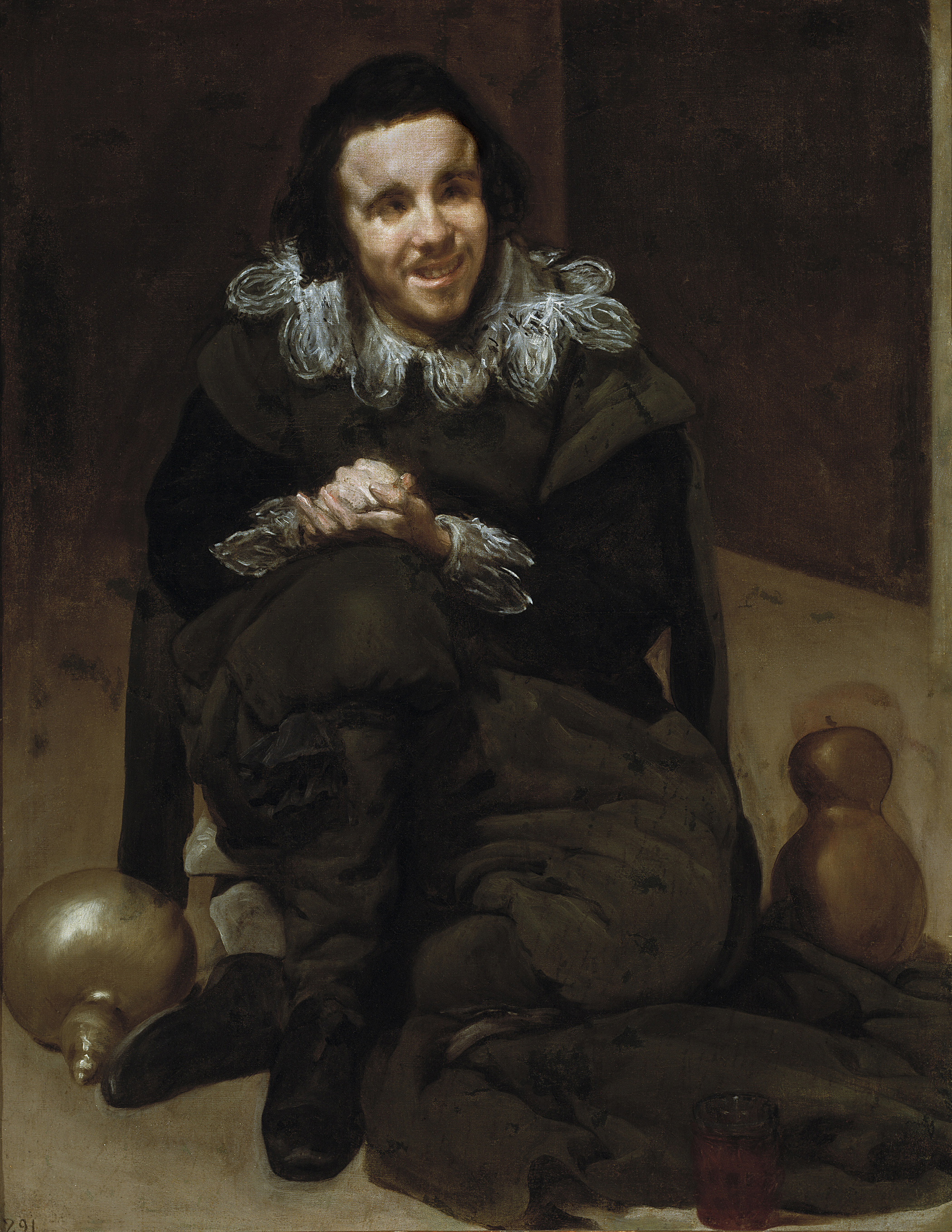
Diego Velázquez, The Jester Calabacillas (Madrid) (1637-39) is a prime example of the wet-on-wet technique.

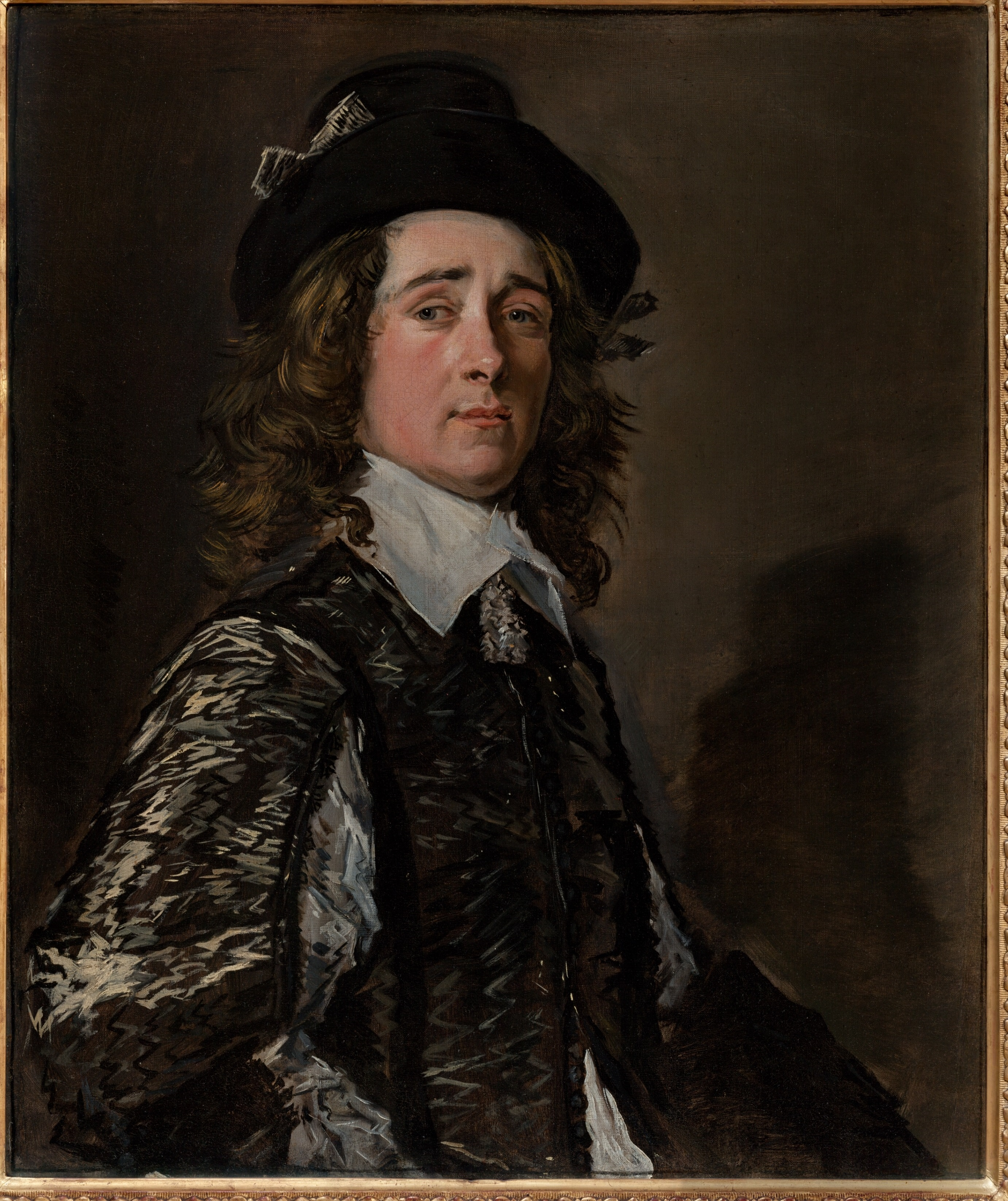
Frans Hals, Jasper Schade van Westrum (1645); painted mostly wet-on-wet. The forehead has portions of wet (white) over dry (brown/black).

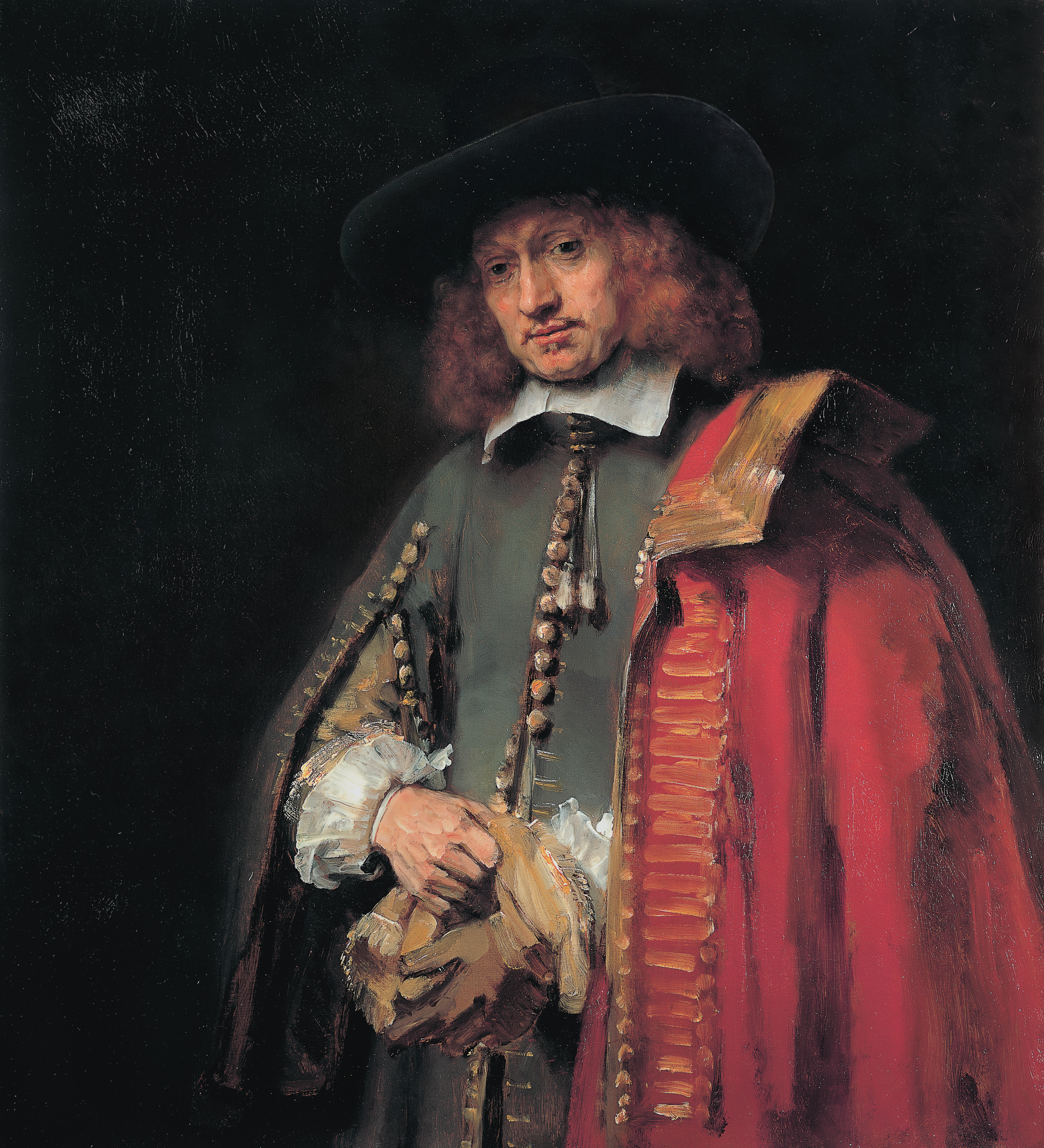
Rembrandt, Portrait of Jan Six (1654) has numerous uses of the wet-on-wet method.

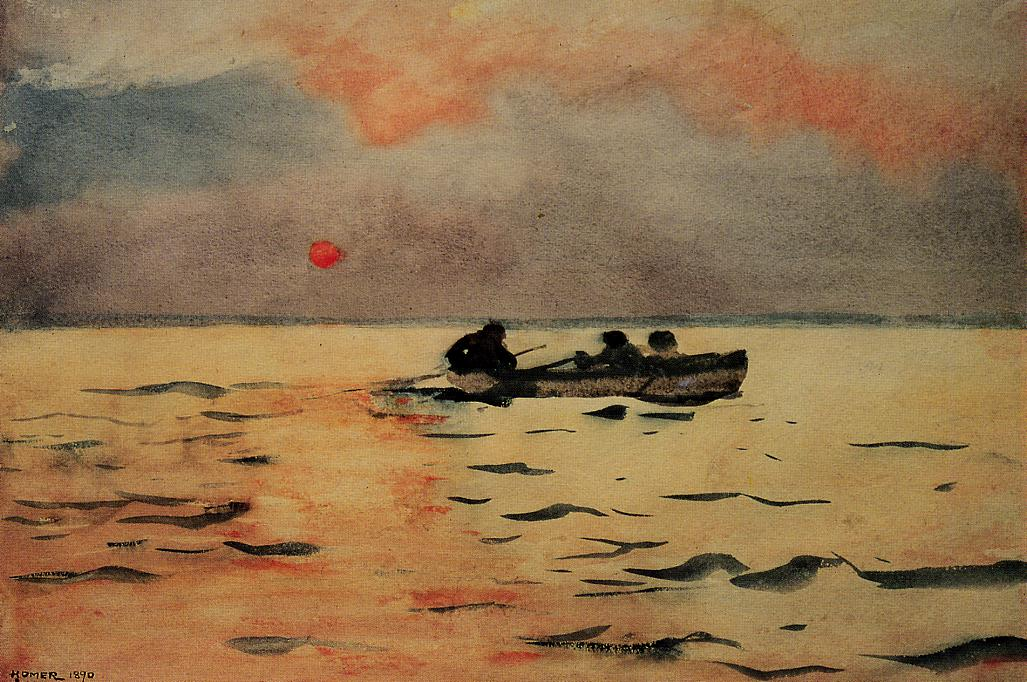
Winslow Homer, Rowing Home (1890), an example of the wet-on-wet technique in watercolor, especially in the sky

Wet-on-wet, or alla prima (Italian, meaning at first attempt), direct painting or au premier coup, is a painting technique in which layers of wet paint are applied to previously administered layers of wet paint. Used mostly in oil painting, the technique requires a fast way of working, because the work has to be finished before the first layers have dried.

== Technique ==
Traditionally, a new layer of oil-based paint is applied to most parts of a painting only after allowing a previous layer to dry completely; this drying process can take from several days to several weeks, depending on the thickness of the paint. In contrast, work performed using alla prima can be carried out in one or more sessions (depending on the types of paint used and their respective drying times), and it is common for such a work to be finished in only one session or "sitting".

In the medium of watercolors, wet-on-wet painting requires a certain finesse in embracing unpredictability. Highly translucent and prone to accidents, watercolor paint will bloom in unpredictable ways that, depending on the artist's frame of mind, can be a boon or a burden.

== History ==
Wet-on-wet painting has been practiced alongside other techniques since the development of oil painting and was used by several of the major Early Netherlandish painters in parts of their pictures, such as Jan van Eyck in his 1434 Arnolfini Portrait, and Rogier van der Weyden.

Since the mid-19th century, the use of commercially produced paints in small collapsible tubes has facilitated an easily accessible variety of colors to be used for rapid and on-the-spot painting. Impressionists such as Claude Monet, post-Impressionists such as Vincent van Gogh, realists such as John Singer Sargent and Robert Henri and George Bellows, Expressionists such as Chaïm Soutine and Yitzhak Frenkel, and the Abstract Expressionist Willem de Kooning have in different ways employed this technique, and it is still heavily used by both figurative and non-figurative fine artists. Artist Bob Ross employed the technique for his show The Joy of Painting in order to produce complete pieces in real-time within a single episode, after learning the technique from his mentor William "Bill" Alexander.

== In industry ==
Wet-on-wet applications are common in the auto industry. A handful of products exist allowing for the use of wet-on-wet applications in housepainting, but the practice is not popular.
